= List of German football transfers summer 2007 =

This is a list of German football transfers in the summer transfer window 2007 by club. Only transfers of the Bundesliga, and 2. Bundesliga are included.

== Bundesliga ==
=== Hertha BSC Berlin ===
In:

Out:

Note: Flags indicate national team as has been defined under FIFA eligibility rules. Players may hold more than one non-FIFA nationality.

No.	Pos.	Nation	Player
—	MF	GER	Bilal Çubukçu (from Hertha BSC Berlin II)
—	MF	FRA	Ibrahima Traoré (from Hertha BSC Berlin II)
—	MF	BRA	Lucio (from Palmeiras)
—	GK	CZE	Jaroslav Drobný (from VfL Bochum)
—	GK	GER	Sascha Burchert (from Hertha BSC Berlin Youth)
—	DF	GER	Pascal Bieler (loan return from Rot-Weiss Essen)
—	GK	GER	Christopher Gäng (from SV Waldhof Mannheim)
—	FW	NGA	Solomon Okoronkwo (loan return from Rot-Weiss Essen)
—	FW	ARG	Christian Giménez (from Olympique Marseille, previously on loan)
—	MF	POL	Łukasz Piszczek (loan return from Zagłębie Lubin)
—	MF	SWE	Tobias Grahn (on loan from Gimnàstic de Tarragona)
—	FW	BRA	André Lima (from Botafogo)
—	DF	SUI	Steve von Bergen (from FC Zürich)
—	MF	SUI	Fabian Lustenberger (from FC Lucerne)

No.	Pos.	Nation	Player
—	DF	DEN	Dennis Cagara (on loan to FC Nordsjælland)
—	MF	GER	Kevin-Prince Boateng (to Tottenham Hotspur)
—	MF	IRN	Ashkan Dejagah (to VfL Wolfsburg)
—	DF	GER	Christopher Schorch (to Real Madrid B)
—	DF	NED	Dick van Burik (retired)
—	GK	DEN	Kevin Stuhr Ellegaard (to Randers FC)
—	DF	GER	Robert Müller (to FC Carl Zeiss Jena)
—	GK	GER	Nico Pellatz (to Werder Bremen)
—	MF	GER	Zecke (to FC Ingolstadt 04)
—	MF	TUR	Yıldıray Baştürk (to VfB Stuttgart)
—	FW	NED	Ellery Cairo (to Coventry City F.C.)
—	FW	CRO	Srđan Lakić (on loan to Heracles Almelo)
—	DF	GER	Jérôme Boateng (to Hamburger SV)
—	FW	ARG	Christian Giménez (to Deportivo Toluca)

=== Arminia Bielefeld ===
In:

No.	Pos.	Nation	Player
—	DF	GER	Matthias Langkamp (from VfL Wolfsburg)
—	DF	CRO	Andre Mijatović (from SpVgg Greuther Fürth)
—	GK	GER	Daniel Riemer (from Arminia Bielefeld II)
—	GK	RSA	Rowen Fernández (from Kaizer Chiefs)
—	FW	GRE	Leonidas Kampantais (from AEK Athens)
—	MF	GER	Oliver Kirch (from Borussia Mönchengladbach)
—	MF	GER	Robert Tesche (from Arminia Bielefeld II)
—	MF	GER	Stefan Aigner (from Wacker Burghausen)
—	MF	RSA	Siyabonga Nkosi (from Kaizer Chiefs)
—	MF	GER	Daniel Halfar (from 1. FC Kaiserslautern)

Out:

No.	Pos.	Nation	Player
—	DF	GER	Heiko Westermann (to FC Schalke 04)
—	MF	GER	Tim Danneberg (on loan to Eintracht Braunschweig)
—	FW	ALB	Fatmir Vata (to TuS Koblenz)
—	GK	GER	Pascal Formann (to 1. FC Saarbrücken)
—	DF	GER	Finn Holsing (to Werder Bremen II)
—	MF	CMR	Marcel Ndjeng (to Borussia Mönchengladbach)
—	DF	BRA	Marcio Borges (retired)

=== VfL Bochum ===
In:

No.	Pos.	Nation	Player
—	FW	POL	Marcin Mięciel (from PAOK Thessaloniki)
—	GK	CZE	Jan Laštůvka (on loan from Shakhtar Donetsk)
—	FW	AUT	Marc Sand (from FC Kärnten)
—	DF	SWE	Matias Concha (from Djurgårdens IF)
—	DF	FRA	Marc Pfertzel (from AS Livorno)
—	MF	GER	Heinrich Schmidtgal (from SC Verl)
—	DF	ALB	Mergim Mavraj (from SV Darmstadt)
—	FW	SVK	Stanislav Šesták (from MŠK Žilina)
—	DF	ALG	Antar Yahia (from OGC Nice, previously on loan)
—	FW	GRE	Theofanis Gekas (from Panathinaikos, previously on loan)
—	MF	GER	Danny Fuchs (from SpVgg Greuther Fürth)
—	DF	GER	Patrick Fabian (from VfL Bochum II)
—	GK	GER	Philipp Heerwagen (from SpVgg Unterhaching)
—	FW	GER	Benjamin Auer (loan return from 1. FC Kaiserslautern)

Out:

No.	Pos.	Nation	Player
—	MF	BIH	Zvjezdan Misimović (to 1. FC Nürnberg)
—	FW	BRA	Fabio Junior (to Hapoel Tel Aviv)
—	DF	GER	Benjamin Lense (to F.C. Hansa Rostock)
—	DF	BEL	Joris van Hout (to KVC Westerlo)
—	MF	GER	Sebastian Hille (to Borussia Dortmund II)
—	MF	GER	Lucas Oppermann (to Wuppertaler SV Borussia)
—	DF	GER	Heiko Butscher (to SC Freiburg)
—	GK	CZE	Jaroslav Drobný (to Hertha BSC Berlin)
—	MF	CZE	Filip Trojan (to FC St. Pauli)
—	GK	DEN	Peter Skov-Jensen (to Sandefjord Fotball)
—	DF	SUI	David Pallas (released)
—	GK	GER	Alexander Bade (to SC Paderborn)
—	MF	GER	Dariusz Wosz (to Union Bergen)
—	FW	GRE	Theofanis Gekas (to Bayer Leverkusen)

=== Werder Bremen ===
In:

No.	Pos.	Nation	Player
—	FW	CIV	Boubacar Sanogo (from Hamburger SV)
—	MF	BRA	Carlos Alberto (from Corinthians)
—	FW	AUT	Martin Harnik (from Werder Bremen II)
—	GK	GER	Nico Pellatz (from Hertha BSC Berlin)
—	FW	POR	Hugo Almeida (from F.C. Porto, previously on loan)
—	MF	GER	Kevin Artmann (from Werder Bremen II)
—	FW	GER	Kevin Schindler (from Werder Bremen II)
—	MF	DEN	Leon Andreasen (loan return from 1. FSV Mainz 05)
—	FW	COL	John Jairo Mosquera (loan return from Wacker Burghausen)
—	DF	SRB	Duško Tošić (from FC Sochaux)
—	DF	GER	Sebastian Boenisch (from FC Schalke 04)
—	MF	GER	Max Kruse (from Werder Bremen II)

Out:

No.	Pos.	Nation	Player
—	MF	BRA	Carlos Alberto (on loan to FC São Paulo)
—	FW	GER	Miroslav Klose (to FC Bayern Munich)
—	DF	CMR	Francis Banecki (to Werder Bremen II)
—	DF	GER	Florian Mohr (to Werder Bremen II)
—	DF	GER	Jérôme Polenz (to Alemannia Aachen)
—	GK	DEN	Kasper Jensen (to Carl Zeiss Jena)
—	GK	GER	Andreas Reinke (retired)
—	MF	GER	Christian Schulz (to Hannover 96)

=== Energie Cottbus ===
In:

No.	Pos.	Nation	Player
—	FW	DEN	Dennis Sørensen (from FC Midtjylland)
—	DF	GER	Toni Wachsmuth (from FC Carl Zeiss Jena)
—	MF	BUL	Stanislav Angelov (from Levski Sofia)
—	DF	FRA	Christian Bassila (from AEL)
—	DF	ROU	Ovidiu Burca (from FC Naţional București)
—	MF	CYP	Efstathios Aloneftis (from AEL)
—	FW	BUL	Dimitar Rangelov (on loan from Racing Strasbourg)
—	DF	CRO	Kristijan Ipša (from Varteks)
—	MF	GER	Michael Lerchl (from Dynamo Dresden)
—	GK	GER	Martin Männel (from Energie Cottbus II)
—	DF	GER	Silvio Bankert (from Energie Cottbus II)

Out:

No.	Pos.	Nation	Player
—	MF	GER	Daniel Gunkel (to 1. FSV Mainz 05)
—	DF	GER	Benjamin Schöckel (to SV Wehen Wiesbaden)
—	MF	ROU	Vlad Munteanu (to VfL Wolfsburg)
—	FW	ROU	Sergiu Radu (to VfL Wolfsburg)
—	DF	CAN	Kevin McKenna (to 1. FC Köln)
—	FW	GER	Christof Neumann (to Rot-Weiss Erfurt)
—	FW	GHA	Lawrence Aidoo (released)
—	DF	BRA	Sidney (to Kickers Offenbach)
—	FW	GER	Lars Jungnickel (to Dynamo Dresden)
—	GK	GER	André Thoms (released)
—	DF	POL	Lukasz Kanik (to Energie Cottbus II)
—	DF	HUN	Zoltán Szélesi (to Racing Strasbourg)

=== Borussia Dortmund ===
In:

No.	Pos.	Nation	Player
—	FW	ARG	Diego Klimowicz (from VfL Wolfsburg)
—	GK	GER	Marc Ziegler (from 1. FC Saarbrücken)
—	MF	ITA	Giovanni Federico (from Karlsruher SC)
—	FW	CRO	Mladen Petrić (from FC Basel)
—	MF	POL	Kuba (from Wisła Kraków)
—	DF	CRO	Robert Kovač (from Juventus)
—	MF	RSA	Delron Buckley (loan return from FC Basel)
—	MF	GER	Daniel Gordon (from Borussia Dortmund II)

Out:

No.	Pos.	Nation	Player
—	DF	GER	Uwe Hünemeier (to Borussia Dortmund II)
—	MF	TUR	Nuri Şahin (on loan to Feyenoord)
—	FW	GHA	Matthew Amoah (to NAC Breda)
—	GK	GER	Sören Pirson (to Rot-Weiß Essen)
—	MF	COD	Kosi Saka (to Hamburger SV II)
—	GK	GER	Bernd Meier (retired)
—	DF	GER	Christoph Metzelder (to Real Madrid)
—	MF	RSA	Steven Pienaar (on loan to Everton F.C.)
—	FW	POL	Ebi Smolarek (to Racing Santander)

=== MSV Duisburg ===
In:

No.	Pos.	Nation	Player
—	FW	BRA	Ailton (from Red Star Belgrade)
—	DF	NED	Michael Lamey (from PSV Eindhoven)
—	MF	GER	Christian Tiffert (from Red Bull Salzburg)
—	GK	GER	Tom Starke (from SC Paderborn)
—	FW	GER	Simon Terodde (from MSV Duisburg Youth)
—	MF	BRA	Maicon (from Madureira Esporte Clube)
—	FW	NGA	Manasseh Ishiaku (from Club Brugge)
—	DF	BRA	Fernando (free agent)
—	GK	SUI	Marcel Herzog (from FC Schaffhausen)
—	MF	BUL	Blagoy Georgiev (on loan from Red Star Belgrade)
—	DF	GER	Alexander Meyer (from Bayer Leverkusen)
—	FW	GER	Sascha Mölders (from MSV Duisburg II)
—	DF	BRA	Roque Junior (free agent)

Out:

No.	Pos.	Nation	Player
—	DF	BRA	Roque Junior (to Al-Rayyan)
—	DF	GER	Alexander Bugera (to 1. FC Kaiserslautern)
—	MF	GER	Markus Hausweiler (retired)
—	DF	NED	Quido Lanzaat (to CSKA Sofia)
—	GK	GER	Georg Koch (to Dynamo Zagreb)
—	MF	GER	Kai Koitka (to Eintracht Braunschweig)
—	DF	GER	Carsten Wolters (to MSV Duisburg II)
—	FW	GER	Markus Kurth (to Rot-Weiß Essen)

=== Eintracht Frankfurt ===
In:

No.	Pos.	Nation	Player
—	MF	CRO	Krešo Ljubičić (from Eintracht Frankfurt II)
—	DF	MEX	Aaron Galindo (from Grasshopper Club Zürich)
—	MF	IRN	Mehdi Mahdavikia (from Hamburger SV)
—	MF	JPN	Junichi Inamoto (from Galatasaray)

Out:

No.	Pos.	Nation	Player
—	MF	GER	Daniyel Cimen (to Kickers Offenbach, previously on loan at Eintracht Braunschweig)
—	MF	GER	Jermaine Jones (to FC Schalke 04)
—	DF	GER	Christopher Reinhard (to Karlsruher SC)
—	DF	GER	Marko Rehmer (retired)
—	MF	SUI	Benjamin Huggel (to FC Basel)

=== Hamburger SV ===
In:

No.	Pos.	Nation	Player
—	MF	NED	Romeo Castelen (from Feyenoord)
—	MF	SVN	Mišo Brečko (loan return from FC Erzgebirge Aue)
—	FW	EGY	Mohamed Zidan (from 1. FSV Mainz 05)
—	GK	GER	Raphael Wolf (from Hamburger SV Youth)
—	DF	GER	Sebastian Langkamp (from FC Bayern Munich Youth)
—	GK	GER	Wolfgang Hesl (from Hamburger SV II)
—	FW	CMR	Eric Maxim Choupo-Moting (from Hamburger SV II)
—	MF	GER	Sidney Sam (from Hamburger SV II)
—	MF	GER	Timo Kunert (from FC Schalke 04)
—	DF	GER	Jérôme Boateng (from Hertha BSC Berlin)
—	FW	NGA	Macauley Chrisantus (from Hearts of Abuja)

Out:

No.	Pos.	Nation	Player
—	MF	USA	Benny Feilhaber (to Derby County F.C.)
—	FW	GER	Rouwen Hennings (on loan to VfL Osnabrück)
—	MF	GER	Alexander Laas (to VfL Wolfsburg)
—	FW	GER	Benjamin Lauth (to Hannover 96)
—	FW	ALB	Besart Berisha (to Burnley FC)
—	GK	GER	Sascha Kirschstein (on loan to SpVgg Greuther Fürth)
—	MF	IRN	Mehdi Mahdavikia (to Eintracht Frankfurt)
—	GK	GER	Stefan Wächter (to F.C. Hansa Rostock)
—	DF	GER	Mathias Abel (loan return to FC Schalke 04)
—	FW	SRB	Danijel Ljuboja (loan return to VfB Stuttgart)
—	FW	CIV	Boubacar Sanogo (to Werder Bremen)
—	DF	GER	René Klingbeil (to Viking Stavanger)
—	FW	GER	Mustafa Kučuković (to TSV 1860 Munich, previously on loan at SpVgg Greuther Fürth)
—	DF	SUI	Raphael Wicky (to FC Sion)

=== Hannover 96 ===
In:

No.	Pos.	Nation	Player
—	MF	POR	Sergio Pinto (from Alemannia Aachen)
—	MF	FRA	Gaëtan Krebs (from Racing Strasbourg)
—	MF	USA	Sal Zizzo (from UCLA)
—	FW	GER	Benjamin Lauth (from Hamburger SV)
—	FW	GER	Mike Hanke (from VfL Wolfsburg)
—	MF	POR	Ricardo Sousa (loan return from Boavista F.C.)
—	MF	GER	Christian Schulz (from Werder Bremen)
—	DF	GER	Thomas Kleine (from SpVgg Greuther Fürth)
—	MF	BUL	Chavdar Yankov (from Slavia Sofia, previously on loan)

Out:

No.	Pos.	Nation	Player
—	FW	GER	Fabian Montabell (to Hannover 96 II)
—	MF	GER	Johannes Dietwald (to TSV Mühlendorf)
—	DF	GER	Tobias Willers (to KSV Hessen Kassel)
—	FW	SVK	Erik Jendrišek (loan return to MFK Ružomberok)
—	MF	SWE	Christoffer Andersson (to Helsingborg IF)
—	GK	GER	Daniel Haas (to TSG 1899 Hoffenheim)
—	DF	GER	Sören Halfar (on loan to SC Paderborn)
—	FW	ISL	Gunnar Heiðar Þorvaldsson (on loan to Vålerenga)
—	DF	GER	Timo Nagy (to SpVgg Unterhaching, previously on loan at Wacker Burghausen)

=== Karlsruher SC ===
In:

No.	Pos.	Nation	Player
—	MF	GER	Stefan Buck (from SpVgg Unterhaching)
—	DF	GER	Christopher Reinhard (from Eintracht Frankfurt)
—	FW	GER	Christian Timm (from SpVgg Greuther Fürth)
—	FW	GEO	Alexander Iashvili (from SC Freiburg)
—	MF	HUN	Tamas Hajnal (from 1. FC Kaiserslautern)
—	DF	GER	Andreas Görlitz (on loan from FC Bayern Munich)
—	MF	GER	Lars Stindl (from Karlsruher SC Youth)

Out:

No.	Pos.	Nation	Player
—	MF	ITA	Giovanni Federico (to Borussia Dortmund)
—	DF	GER	Marco Manske (released)
—	MF	GER	Jan Männer (to SC Paderborn)
—	FW	CZE	Jiri Kaufman (to FC Erzgebirge Aue)
—	DF	GER	Benjamin Barg (to Karlsruher SC II)
—	MF	GER	Sascha Traut (to TuS Koblenz)
—	DF	GER	Thomas Kies (to SpVgg Durlach-Aue)

=== Bayer Leverkusen ===
In:

No.	Pos.	Nation	Player
—	MF	SEN	Ricardo Faty (on loan from AS Roma)
—	GK	GER	Erik Domaschke (from Bayer Leverkusen II)
—	DF	SVK	Vratislav Greško (from 1. FC Nürnberg)
—	DF	GER	Manuel Friedrich (from 1. FSV Mainz 05)
—	DF	GER	Lukas Sinkiewicz (from 1. FC Köln)
—	MF	CHI	Arturo Vidal (from Colo-Colo)
—	DF	GHA	Hans Adu Sarpei (from VfL Wolfsburg)
—	MF	GER	Sascha Dum (loan return from Alemannia Aachen)
—	FW	GRE	Theofanis Gekas (from VfL Bochum)
—	FW	RUS	Dmitri Bulykin (from Dynamo Moscow)

Out:

No.	Pos.	Nation	Player
—	FW	UKR	Andriy Voronin (to FC Liverpool)
—	DF	TOG	Assimiou Touré (on loan to VfL Osnabrück)
—	DF	BRA	Athirson (to Botafogo)
—	DF	BRA	Roque Junior (released)
—	MF	GER	Pierre de Wit (on loan to VfL Osnabrück)
—	DF	GER	Alexander Meyer (to MSV Duisburg)
—	DF	ALG	Ahmed Reda Madouni (to Al-Gharafa)
—	MF	CRO	Marko Babić (to Real Betis)
—	GK	GER	Hans-Jörg Butt (to S.L. Benfica)
—	DF	BRA	Júan (to AS Roma)
—	DF	SWE	Fredrik Stenman (to FC Groningen)

=== FC Bayern Munich ===
In:

No.	Pos.	Nation	Player
—	FW	GER	Miroslav Klose (from Werder Bremen)
—	MF	BRA	Zé Roberto (from Santos FC)
—	MF	FRA	Franck Ribéry (from Olympique Marseille)
—	FW	GER	Jan Schlaudraff (from Alemannia Aachen)
—	DF	GER	Marcell Jansen (from Borussia Mönchengladbach)
—	MF	ARG	José Ernesto Sosa (from Estudiantes de La Plata)
—	MF	TUR	Hamit Altıntop (from FC Schalke 04)
—	FW	ITA	Luca Toni (from AC Fiorentina)

Out:

No.	Pos.	Nation	Player
—	FW	PER	Claudio Pizarro (to Chelsea)
—	MF	IRN	Ali Karimi (to Qatar SC)
—	MF	ENG	Owen Hargreaves (to Manchester United)
—	MF	BIH	Hasan Salihamidzic (Juventus)
—	FW	NED	Roy Makaay (to Feyenoord)
—	FW	PAR	Roque Santa Cruz (to Blackburn Rovers)
—	MF	GER	Mehmet Scholl (retired)
—	DF	GER	Andreas Görlitz (on loan to Karlsruher SC)
—	MF	PAR	Julio dos Santos (on loan to UD Almería, previously on loan at VfL Wolfsburg)

=== 1. FC Nürnberg ===
In:

No.	Pos.	Nation	Player
—	MF	AUS	Dario Vidošić (from Queensland Roar)
—	DF	AUS	Michael Beauchamp (from Central Coast Mariners)
—	MF	GER	Peer Kluge (from Borussia Mönchengladbach)
—	FW	GER	Nicky Adler (from TSV 1860 Munich)
—	MF	BIH	Zvjezdan Misimović (from VfL Bochum)
—	FW	GRE	Angelos Charisteas (from Feyenoord)
—	DF	ARG	Javier Pinola (from Atlético Madrid)
—	DF	DEN	Lars Jacobsen (from FC Copenhagen)
—	GK	CZE	Jaromír Blažek (from Sparta Prague)

Out:

No.	Pos.	Nation	Player
—	MF	GER	Sebastian Huber (retired)
—	DF	CZE	Marek Nikl (to 1. FC Nürnberg II)
—	DF	SVK	Vratislav Greško (to Bayer Leverkusen)
—	FW	NED	Gerald Sibon (to SC Heerenveen)
—	MF	CRO	Ivica Banović (to SC Freiburg)
—	DF	GER	Thomas Paulus (to FC Erzgebirge Aue)
—	FW	GER	Markus Schroth (to TSV 1860 Munich)
—	GK	GER	Raphael Schäfer (to VfB Stuttgart)
—	DF	AUS	Dean Heffernan (loan return to Central Coast Mariners)
—	MF	CZE	Jan Polák (to RSC Anderlecht)
—	FW	BIH	Petar Jelić (to OFK Belgrade)

=== F.C. Hansa Rostock ===
In:

No.	Pos.	Nation	Player
—	DF	USA	Heath Pearce (from FC Nordsjælland)
—	DF	BRA	Orestes (from Naval)
—	FW	COD	Addy-Waku Menga (from VfL Osnabrück)
—	DF	GER	Benjamin Lense (from VfL Bochum)
—	DF	BRA	Diego Morais Pacheco (from Villa Rio)
—	MF	GER	Fin Bartels (from Holstein Kiel)
—	MF	CAN	Ryan Gyaki (from Sheffield United)
—	MF	GER	Simon Tüting (from VfL Osnbrück II)
—	GK	GER	Stefan Wächter (from Hamburger SV)
—	FW	NGA	Victor Agali (free agent)

Out:

No.	Pos.	Nation	Player
—	MF	GER	Michael Hartmann (to F.C. Hansa Rostock II)
—	MF	GER	Anton Müller (to Chemnitzer FC)
—	DF	GER	Martin Pohl (to FC Rot-Weiß Erfurt)
—	DF	BRA	Gledson (to VfB Stuttgart)
—	GK	GER	Mathias Schober (to FC Schalke 04)
—	DF	DEN	Kim Madsen (to Aarhus GF)
—	MF	GER	Kevin Hansen (to FC Erzgebirge Aue)
—	MF	GER	Maik Wagefeld (to Dynamo Dresden)

=== FC Schalke 04 ===
In:

No.	Pos.	Nation	Player
—	MF	GER	Mimoun Azaouagh (loan return from 1. FSV Mainz 05)
—	MF	CRO	Ivan Rakitić (from FC Basel)
—	GK	GER	Mathias Schober (from F.C. Hansa Rostock)
—	MF	GER	Jermaine Jones (from Eintracht Frankfurt)
—	DF	GER	Mathias Abel (loan return from Hamburger SV)
—	DF	GER	Benedikt Höwedes (from FC Schalke 04 II)
—	DF	GER	Heiko Westermann (from Arminia Bielefeld)
—	MF	URU	Carlos Grossmüller (from FC Danubio Montevideo)

Out:

No.	Pos.	Nation	Player
—	MF	BRA	Lincoln (to Galatasaray)
—	DF	GER	Tim Hoogland (to 1. FSV Mainz 05)
—	DF	GER	Niko Bungert (to Kickers Offenbach)
—	GK	GER	Dennis Lamczyk (to KSV Hessen Kassel)
—	MF	TUR	Hamit Altıntop (to FC Bayern Munich)
—	FW	GER	Michael Delura (to Panionios)
—	MF	GER	Timo Kunert (to Hamburger SV)
—	DF	GER	Sebastian Boenisch (to Werder Bremen)

=== VfB Stuttgart ===
In:

No.	Pos.	Nation	Player
—	GK	GER	Alexander Stolz (from VfB Stuttgart II)
—	GK	GER	Raphael Schäfer (from 1. FC Nürnberg)
—	DF	BRA	Gledson (from F.C. Hansa Rostock)
—	MF	TUR	Yıldıray Baştürk (from Hertha BSC Berlin)
—	FW	SRB	Danijel Ljuboja (loan return from Hamburger SV)
—	MF	CMR	Georges Mandjeck (from Kadji Sports Academy)
—	FW	BRA	Ewerthon (from Real Saragossa)
—	FW	ROU	Ciprian Marica (from Shakhtar Donetsk)

Out:

No.	Pos.	Nation	Player
—	MF	GER	Christian Gentner (on loan to VfL Wolfsburg)
—	MF	CRO	Mario Carević (to KSC Lokeren)
—	FW	DEN	Jon Dahl Tomasson (to Villarreal CF)
—	MF	GER	Daniel Bierofka (to TSV 1860 Munich)
—	FW	SUI	Marco Streller (to FC Basel)
—	MF	GER	Tobias Weis (to TSG 1899 Hoffenheim)
—	MF	GER	Marco Caligiuri (to SpVgg Greuther Fürth)
—	FW	GER	Bernd Nehrig (to SpVgg Greuther Fürth)
—	GK	GER	Timo Hildebrand (to Valencia CF)
—	GK	GER	Dirk Heinen (retired)
—	DF	GER	Heiko Gerber (to FC Ingolstadt 04)
—	DF	GER	Markus Babbel (retired)

=== VfL Wolfsburg ===
In:

No.	Pos.	Nation	Player
—	FW	SEN	Mame Niang (from Moroka Swallows)
—	DF	GER	Marcel Schäfer (from TSV 1860 Munich)
—	DF	GER	Alexander Laas (from Hamburger SV)
—	MF	GER	Christian Gentner (on loan from VfB Stuttgart)
—	MF	IRN	Ashkan Dejagah (from Hertha BSC Berlin)
—	FW	ROU	Sergiu Radu (from FC Energie Cottbus)
—	MF	ROU	Vlad Munteanu (from FC Energie Cottbus)
—	MF	GER	Daniel Baier (from TSV 1860 Munich)
—	FW	BIH	Edin Džeko (from FK Teplice)
—	DF	POR	Ricardo Costa (from F.C. Porto)
—	DF	GER	Sascha Riether (from SC Freiburg)
—	FW	BRA	Grafite (from Le Mans Union Club 72)
—	DF	CZE	Jan Simunek (from Sparta Prague)
—	MF	BRA	Josué (from FC São Paulo)

Out:

No.	Pos.	Nation	Player
—	DF	GER	Matthias Langkamp (to Arminia Bielefeld)
—	DF	NED	Kevin Hofland (to Feyenoord)
—	FW	BRA	Abuda (to CR Vasco da Gama)
—	MF	NED	Tom van der Leegte (to PSV Eindhoven)
—	FW	GER	Mike Hanke (to Hannover 96)
—	DF	GER	Michael Stegmayer (to FC Carl Zeiss Jena)
—	MF	PAR	Julio dos Santos (loan return to FC Bayern Munich)
—	MF	BUL	Marian Hristov (released)
—	MF	SVK	Miroslav Karhan (to 1. FSV Mainz 05)
—	FW	ARG	Diego Klimowicz (to Borussia Dortmund)
—	MF	ARG	Andrés D'Alessandro (to Real Saragossa)
—	DF	GER	Uwe Möhrle (on loan to FC Augsburg)
—	MF	GER	Steve Müller (to VfB Lübeck)
—	FW	ARG	Juan Carlos Menseguez (to San Lornezo)
—	DF	GHA	Hans Adu Sarpei (to Bayer Leverkusen)

== 2. Bundesliga ==
=== Alemannia Aachen ===
In:

No.	Pos.	Nation	Player
—	DF	GER	Jérôme Polenz (from Werder Bremen)
—	MF	FIN	Pekka Lagerblom (from 1. FC Köln)
—	DF	GER	Benjamin Weigelt (from 1. FSV Mainz 05)
—	FW	BUL	Todor Kolev (on loan from Slavia Sofia)
—	FW	CZE	Lubos Pecka (from FK Mladá Boleslav)
—	MF	GER	Faton Popova (from Alemannia Aachen II)
—	GK	GER	Thorsten Stuckmann (from Eintracht Braunschweig)
—	DF	CRO	Hrvoje Vuković (from Wacker Burghausen)
—	MF	GER	Patrick Milchraum (from TSV 1860 Munich)

Out:

No.	Pos.	Nation	Player
—	MF	POR	Sergio Pinto (to Hannover 96)
—	MF	GER	Sascha Dum (loan return to Bayer Leverkusen)
—	FW	GER	Jan Schlaudraff (to FC Bayern Munich)
—	MF	GER	Sascha Rösler (to Borussia Mönchengladbach)
—	FW	BIH	Vedad Ibišević (ti TSG 1899 Hoffenheim)
—	DF	ZAM	Moses Sichone (to Kickers Offenbach)
—	MF	GER	Matthias Heidrich (to VfL Osnabrück)
—	GK	GER	Marcus Hesse (to Dynamo Dresden)
—	MF	GER	Yunus Balaban (to Ankaragücü)

=== FC Erzgebirge Aue ===
In:

No.	Pos.	Nation	Player
—	FW	CZE	Jiří Kaufman (from Karlsruher SC)
—	DF	GER	Thomas Paulus (from 1. FC Nürnberg)
—	MF	GER	Kevin Hansen (from F.C. Hansa Rostock)
—	MF	GER	Tom Geißler (from 1. FSV Mainz 05)
—	FW	SVN	Ljubisa Strbac (from NK Interblock Ljubljana)
—	MF	GER	Nicolas Feldhahn (from SpVgg Unterhaching)
—	FW	GER	Fiete Sykora (from FC Carl Zeiss Jena)
—	MF	GER	Carsten Sträßer (from SpVgg Unterhaching)
—	DF	GER	Fabian Müller (from FC Bayern Munich II)
—	FW	SVK	Adam Nemec (on loan from MŠK Žilina)

Out:

No.	Pos.	Nation	Player
—	MF	SVN	Mišo Brečko (loan return to Hamburger SV)
—	DF	GER	Uwe Ehlers (to VfL Osnabrück)
—	GK	BUL	Russi Petkov (to FSV Oggersheim)
—	MF	GER	Mitja Schäfer (to Rot-Weiß Essen)
—	DF	POL	Marcin Adamski (released)
—	MF	CZE	Richard Dostálek (to Sportfreunde Siegen)
—	FW	GER	Ersin Demir (to FC Ingolstadt)
—	DF	GEO	David Siradze (to SC Paderborn)
—	FW	POL	Andrzej Juskowiak (retired)
—	MF	GER	Christian Lenze (to Eintracht Braunschweig)

=== FC Augsburg ===
In:

No.	Pos.	Nation	Player
—	DF	GER	Uwe Möhrle (on loan from VfL Wolfsburg)
—	FW	HUN	Imre Szabics (from 1. FSV Mainz 05)
—	GK	GER	Philipp Pentke (from TSV 1860 Munich)
—	FW	UKR	Anton Makarenko (from FC Augsburg Youth)
—	DF	CZE	Václav Drobný (from Sparta Prague)
—	FW	GER	Marco Vorbeck (from Dynamo Dresden)
—	GK	GER	Patrick Lehner (from FC Augsburg Youth)
—	MF	SVK	Petr Hlinka (from Rapid Wien)
—	MF	GER	Bajram Nebihi (from TSV Aindling)
—	FW	CRC	Froylan Ledezma (from SCR Altach)
—	MF	MAR	Mourad Hdiouad (from CSKA Sofia)

Out:

No.	Pos.	Nation	Player
—	MF	GER	Leonhard Haas (to SpVgg Greuther Fürth)
—	MF	GER	Marco Löring (released)
—	FW	BEL	Axel Lawarée (to Fortuna Düsseldorf)
—	MF	GER	Karsten Hutwelker (to SCR Altach)
—	GK	GER	Christian Kreiglmeier (released)
—	DF	GER	Torsten Traub (to VfR Aalen)
—	FW	GER	Forian Galuschka (to Wacker Burghausen)
—	GK	CRO	Zdenko Miletić (retired)

=== SC Freiburg ===
In:

No.	Pos.	Nation	Player
—	DF	GER	Heiko Butscher (from VfL Bochum)
—	MF	CRO	Ivica Banović (from 1. FC Nürnberg)
—	FW	BIH	Mirnes Mešić (from TSG 1899 Hoffenheim)
—	MF	GER	Dennis Kruppke (loan return from VfB Lübeck)
—	MF	GER	Maximilian Mehring (from SC Freiburg II)
—	MF	GER	Kevin Schlitte (from FC Carl Zeiss Jena)
—	MF	TUR	Ali Güneş (from Beşiktaş J.K.)
—	DF	GER	Oliver Barth (from Fortuna Düsseldorf)
—	FW	FRA	Jonathan Jäger (from 1. FC Saarbrücken)
—	DF	CZE	Pavel Krmaš (from FK Teplice)
—	MF	NGA	Eke Uzoma (from SC Freiburg Youth)
—	DF	GER	Ömer Toprak (from SC Freiburg Youth)

Out:

No.	Pos.	Nation	Player
—	FW	GEO	Alexander Iashvili (to Karlsruher SC)
—	DF	GER	Sascha Riether (to VfL Wolfsburg)
—	MF	MLI	Soumaila Coulibaly (to Borussia Mönchengladbach)
—	DF	LBN	Youssef Mohamad (to 1. FC Köln)
—	MF	LBN	Roda Antar (to 1. FC Köln)
—	GK	GER	Dominik Wohlfarth (to SC Freiburg II)
—	MF	MLI	Boubacar Coulibaly (to SV Wehen Wiesbaden II)
—	MF	GER	Niels Hansen (to FC Carl Zeiss Jena)
—	MF	MLI	Boubacar Diarra (to 1. FC Kaiserslautern)
—	FW	GHA	Ibrahim Tanko (retired)

=== SpVgg Greuther Fürth ===
In:

No.	Pos.	Nation	Player
—	GK	GER	Sascha Kirschstein (on loan from Hamburger SV)
—	MF	GER	Marco Caligiuri (from VfB Stuttgart)
—	FW	GER	Bernd Nehrig (from VfB Stuttgart)
—	FW	GER	Aleksandar Kotuljac (from 1. FC Magdeburg)
—	MF	GER	Thorsten Burkhardt (from Wacker Burghausen)
—	DF	GER	Tom Bertram (from Rot-Weiß Erfurt)
—	FW	AUT	Stefan Maierhofer (from TuS Koblenz)
—	MF	GER	Leonhard Haas (from FC Augsburg)
—	DF	BUL	Asen Karaslavov (on loan from Slavia Sofia)
—	DF	CRO	Marino Biliskov (from Iraklis)
—	GK	GER	Jens Grahl (from SpVgg Greuther Fürth II)
—	MF	GER	Nicolai Müller (from SpVgg Greuther Fürth II)
—	MF	AUT	Robert Schellander (on loan from FC Kärnten)

Out:

No.	Pos.	Nation	Player
—	DF	CRO	Andre Mijatović (to Arminia Bielefeld)
—	MF	GER	Danny Fuchs (to VfL Bochum)
—	FW	GER	Mustafa Kučuković (loan return to Hamburger SV)
—	DF	GER	Thomas Kleine (to Hannover 96)
—	FW	GER	Christian Timm (to Karlsruher SC)
—	FW	BRA	Diego Viana (to SV Grödig)
—	FW	GER	Torsten Oehrl (on loan to Eintracht Braunschweig)
—	MF	DEN	Hans Henrik Andreasen (to Odense BK)
—	MF	TUR	Barbaros Barut (to Kasimpaşa)
—	MF	GER	Olivier Caillas (to SV Wehen Wiesbaden)
—	GK	BIH	Jasmin Fejzic (on loan to Eintracht Braunschweig)
—	DF	SVN	Aleš Kokot (to SV Wehen Wiesbaden)
—	DF	SVN	Dejan Kelhar (to SpVgg Greuther Fürth II)

=== TSG 1899 Hoffenheim ===
In:

No.	Pos.	Nation	Player
—	GK	GER	Daniel Haas (from Hannover 96)
—	MF	GER	Tobias Weis (from VfB Stuttgart)
—	MF	GER	Steffen Haas (from 1899 Hoffenheim II)
—	DF	SWE	Per Nilsson (from Odd Grenland)
—	MF	GHA	Isaac Vorsah (on loan from Asante Kotoko)
—	FW	BIH	Vedad Ibišević (from Alemannia Aachen)
—	FW	SEN	Demba Ba (from Excelsior Mouscron)
—	MF	BRA	Carlos Eduardo (from Grêmio)
—	MF	BRA	Luis Gustavo (on loan from Corinthians Alagoano)
—	FW	NGA	Chinedu Obasi (from Lyn Oslo)

Out:

No.	Pos.	Nation	Player
—	DF	GER	Mario Göttlicher (to SV Sandhausen)
—	DF	GER	Denis Lapaczinski (to 1899 Hoffenheim II)
—	DF	GER	Michael Zepek (to SV Elversberg)
—	MF	GER	Sebastian Hoeneß (to Hertha BSC Berlin II)
—	FW	GER	Daniel Reule (to Waldhoff Mannheim)
—	DF	GER	Christian Daub (to FC Astoria Walldorf)
—	MF	GER	Sandro Cescutti (to VfR Aalen)
—	FW	BIH	Mirnes Mešić (to SC Freiburg)

=== FC Carl Zeiss Jena ===
In:

No.	Pos.	Nation	Player
—	DF	GER	Robert Müller (from Hertha BSC Berlin)
—	GK	DEN	Kasper Jensen (from Werder Bremen)
—	DF	GER	Michael Stegmayer (from VfL Wolfsburg)
—	MF	GER	Niels Hansen (from SC Freiburg)
—	MF	CZE	Jan Šimák (from Sparta Prague)
—	DF	GEO	Ilia Kandelaki (from FC Chornomorets Odesa)
—	DF	GEO	Giorgi Oniani (from Sioni Bolnisi)
—	FW	GER	Nils Petersen (from FC Carl Zeiss Jena II)
—	MF	GEO	Giorgi Seturidze (from Sioni Bolnisi)
—	MF	CYP	Constantinos Charalambidis (from Panathinaikos F.C.)
—	MF	ARG	Victor Hugo Lorenzon (from Rot-Weiss Essen)
—	DF	NGA	Darlington Omodiagbe (from SpVgg Unterhaching)
—	DF	GER	Marcus Hoffmann (from FC Energie Cottbus II)
—	FW	TUN	Sami Allagui (from RSC Anderlecht)
—	FW	GEO	Revaz Barabadze (from Dnipropetrovsk)
—	FW	HUN	Sándor Torghelle (from PAOK Thessaloniki)
—	FW	SEN	Dabacar N'Diaye (free agent)

Out:

No.	Pos.	Nation	Player
—	DF	GER	Toni Wachsmuth (to FC Energie Cottbus)
—	DF	GER	Alexander Voigt (to Borussia Mönchengladbach)
—	MF	GER	Kevin Schlitte (to SC Freiburg)
—	FW	GER	Fiete Sykora (to FC Erzgebirge Aue)
—	FW	GER	Mark Zimmermann (to FC Carl Zeiss Jena II)
—	FW	FIN	Njazi Kuqi (released)
—	FW	SUI	Patrick de Napoli (to Zug 94)
—	FW	GEO	Mikhail Ashvetia (to Anzhi)
—	GK	GEO	Georgi Lomaya (to Karpaty Lviv)
—	DF	NED	Leen van Steensel (loan return to FC Utrecht)
—	DF	CRO	Lovre Vulin (to Zalaegerszegi TE)
—	DF	POL	Krzysztof Kowalik (to VfB Pößneck)
—	FW	TUR	Sercan Güvenışık (to Rot-Weiss Essen)
—	MF	GER	Andreas Keil (retired)
—	MF	GER	Ronny Thielemann (to FC Energie Cottbus II)
—	GK	GER	Norman Wohlfeld (to VfB Pößneck)
—	MF	MAR	Mohammed El Berkani (to Sportfreunde Siegen)
—	DF	GER	Ronald Maul (released)

=== 1. FC Kaiserslautern ===
In:

No.	Pos.	Nation	Player
—	DF	GER	Alexander Bugera (from MSV Duisburg)
—	MF	MLI	Boubacar Diarra (from SC Freiburg)
—	FW	SWE	Björn Runström (on loan from Fulham FC)
—	MF	CAN	Patrice Bernier (from Tromsø IL)
—	FW	SVK	Erik Jendrišek (MFK Ružomberok)
—	DF	GER	Sascha Kotysch (from 1. FC Kaiserslautern II)
—	MF	DEN	Esben Hansen (from Odense BK)

Out:

No.	Pos.	Nation	Player
—	MF	GER	Daniel Halfar (to Arminia Bielefeld)
—	FW	GER	Benjamin Auer (loan return to VfL Bochum)
—	MF	HUN	Tamás Hajnal (to Karlsruher SC)
—	FW	ALG	Noureddine Daham (to TuS Koblenz)
—	DF	GER	Andreas Gaebler (to SV Wilhelmshaven)
—	DF	FIN	Aki Riihilahti (to Djurgårdens IF)
—	MF	GER	Michael Lehmann (to FC Wil)
—	MF	BRA	Ricardo Villar (to SpVgg Unterhaching)
—	MF	NOR	Azar Karadas (loan return to S.L. Benfica)
—	DF	ALG	Ismaël Bouzid (to Galatasaray)
—	MF	SVK	Balázs Borbély (loan return to FC Artmedia Petržalka)
—	DF	GER	Matthias Henn (to Eintracht Braunschweig)
—	GK	AUT	Jürgen Macho (to AEK Athens)

=== TuS Koblenz ===
In:

No.	Pos.	Nation	Player
—	FW	ALB	Fatmir Vata (from Arminia Bielefeld)
—	MF	GER	Sascha Traut (from Karlsruher SC)
—	DF	KOR	Du-Ri Cha (from 1. FSV Mainz 05)
—	FW	GER	Tayfun Pektürk (from FC Schalke 04 Youth)
—	MF	MNE	Ardijan Djokaj (from Trabzonspor)
—	MF	MKD	Artim Polozani (from FK Makedonija)
—	DF	SRB	Marko Lomić (from FK Partizan)
—	DF	BIH	Branimir Bajić (from FK Partizan)
—	DF	SVN	Matej Mavrič (from Molde FK)
—	MF	GER	Manuel Hartmann (from Stuttgarter Kickers)
—	FW	MNE	Dragan Bogavac (from Wacker Burghausen)
—	FW	ALG	Noureddine Daham (from 1. FC Kaiserslautern)

Out:

No.	Pos.	Nation	Player
—	FW	AUT	Stefan Maierhofer (to SpVgg Greuther Fürth)
—	GK	GER	Peter Auer (retired)
—	MF	GER	Ralf Klingmann (to TSV Buchbach)
—	MF	GER	Domenico Cozza (to Alemannia Aachen II)
—	FW	LTU	Dmitrijus Guscinas (to Holstein Kiel)
—	MF	GER	Christian Holzer (to VfR Aalen)
—	MF	GER	Silvio Adzic (to FSV Oggersheim)
—	MF	GHA	Anthony Tiéku (released)
—	FW	SEN	Salif Keïta (released)
—	DF	GER	Emil Noll (to SC Paderborn)
—	FW	GER	Johannes Rahn (to VfB Stuttgart II)
—	FW	CRO	Filip Lovric (to FV Engers)
—	MF	GER	Christof Babatz (to Waldhoff Mannheim)

=== 1. FC Köln ===
In:

No.	Pos.	Nation	Player
—	DF	CAN	Kevin McKenna (from FC Energie Cottbus)
—	DF	LBN	Youssef Mohamad (from SC Freiburg)
—	FW	SRB	Nemanja Vučićević (from TSV 1860 Munich)
—	GK	COL	Faryd Mondragón (from Galatasaray)
—	DF	TUR	Ümit Özat (from Fenerbahçe)
—	GK	GER	Dieter Paucken (from 1. FC Köln II)
—	MF	LBN	Roda Antar (from SC Freiburg)
—	DF	GER	Tobias Nickenig (loan return from Sportfreunde Siegen)
—	MF	HON	Maynor Suazo (on loan from Antalyaspor)

Out:

No.	Pos.	Nation	Player
—	DF	GER	Lukas Sinkiewicz (to Bayer Leverkusen)
—	DF	GER	Patrick Weiser (retired)
—	MF	FIN	Pekka Lagerblom (to Alemannia Aachen)
—	FW	NED	Anthony Lurling (to NAC Breda)
—	MF	GER	Enis Alushi (to SV Wehen Wiesbaden)
—	MF	SUI	Ricardo Cabanas (to Grasshopper Club Zürich)
—	GK	GER	Benjamin Finke (to SC Verl)
—	DF	SUI	Bernt Haas (to FC St. Gallen)
—	FW	TUR	Serhat Akın (loan return to RSC Anderlecht)
—	DF	NOR	Marius Johnsen (loan return to IK Start)
—	DF	GER	Carsten Cullmann (to 1. FC Köln II)
—	FW	DEN	Peter Madsen (to Brøndby IF)
—	DF	BRA	Fabio Luciano (to Flamengo)
—	FW	BRA	Thiago Cavalcanti (to Juventude)
—	MF	GER	Denis Epstein (to Kickers Offenbach, previously on loan at Rot-Weiss Essen)
—	GK	GER	Stefan Wessels (to Everton F.C.)

=== 1. FSV Mainz ===
In:

No.	Pos.	Nation	Player
—	MF	GER	Daniel Gunkel (from FC Energie Cottbus)
—	DF	GER	Tim Hoogland (from FC Schalke 04)
—	MF	SVK	Miroslav Karhan (from VfL Wolfsburg)
—	MF	DEN	Bo Svensson (from Borussia Mönchengladbach)
—	MF	GER	Nejmeddin Daghfous (from 1. FSV Mainz II)
—	FW	ECU	Felix Borja (on loan from Olympiacos)
—	DF	SRB	Neven Subotić (from 1. FSV Mainz II)
—	FW	SRB	Srđan Baljak (from FK Banat Zrenjanin)
—	DF	GER	Stefan Markolf (from 1. FSV Mainz II)
—	DF	GER	Fabian Liesenfeld (from 1. FSV Mainz II)
—	MF	GER	Roman Neustädter (from 1. FSV Mainz II)
—	DF	BRA	Wellington Santos da Silva (on loan from Grêmio)
—	MF	CRO	Josip Landeka (from 1. FSV Mainz II)

Out:

No.	Pos.	Nation	Player
—	MF	DEN	Leon Andreasen (loan return to Werder Bremen)
—	FW	EGY	Mohamed Zidan (to Hamburger SV)
—	DF	GER	Manuel Friedrich (to Bayer Leverkusen)
—	MF	GER	Mimoun Azaouagh (loan return to FC Schalke 04)
—	FW	GER	Tobias Damm (to Wuppertaler SV Borussia, previously on loan)
—	FW	ROU	Marius Niculae (to Inverness Caledonian Thistle F.C.)
—	FW	MLI	Bakary Diakité (on loan to SV Wehen Wiesbaden)
—	FW	GER	Christoph Teinert (to Wacker Burghausen)
—	MF	GHA	Otto Addo (to Hamburger SV II)
—	DF	GER	Ralph Gunesch (to FC St. Pauli)
—	MF	GER	Fatmir Pupalovic (to Wacker Burghausen)
—	DF	KOR	Du-Ri Cha (to TuS Koblenz)
—	MF	GER	Fabian Gerber (to OFI)
—	FW	HUN	Imre Szabics (to FC Augsburg)
—	DF	GER	Benjamin Weigelt (to Alemannia Aachen)
—	MF	GER	Tom Geißler (to FC Erzgebirge Aue)

=== Borussia Mönchengladbach ===
In:

No.	Pos.	Nation	Player
—	MF	CMR	Marcel Ndjeng (from Arminia Bielefeld)
—	MF	GER	Johannes van den Bergh (from Borussia Mönchengladbach II)
—	FW	CAN	Rob Friend (from SC Heerenveen)
—	MF	MLI	Soumaila Coulibaly (from SC Freiburg)
—	MF	NED	Patrick Paauwe (from FC Valenciennes)
—	FW	GER	Moses Lamidi (from Borussia Mönchengladbach II)
—	DF	GER	Sebastian Schachten (from Werder Bremen II)
—	MF	GER	Marko Marin (from Borussia Mönchengladbach II)
—	MF	GER	Sascha Rösler (from Alemannia Aachen)
—	GK	GER	Uwe Gospodarek (from Wacker Burghausen)
—	DF	GER	Alexander Voigt (from FC Carl Zeiss Jena)
—	DF	NED	Roel Brouwers (from SC Paderborn)
—	MF	SWE	Sharbel Touma (from FC Twente)
—	FW	ISR	Roberto Colautti (from Maccabi Haifa)

Out:

No.	Pos.	Nation	Player
—	MF	GER	Oliver Kirch (to Arminia Bielefeld)
—	DF	GER	Marcell Jansen (to FC Bayern Munich)
—	MF	GER	Peer Kluge (to 1. FC Nürnberg)
—	FW	CZE	Václav Svěrkoš (to FC Baník Ostrava)
—	MF	DEN	Mikkel Thygesen (to FC Midtjylland)
—	MF	BEL	Bernd Thijs (to KAA Gent)
—	MF	ARG	Federico Insúa (to Club América)
—	MF	DEN	Bo Svensson (to 1. FSV Mainz 05)
—	MF	NOR	Hassan El Fakiri (to SK Brann)
—	GK	USA	Kasey Keller (to Fulham FC)
—	FW	BEL	Wesley Sonck (to Club Brugge)
—	FW	BRA	Kahê (to Gençlerbirliği S.K.)
—	MF	SUI	David Degen (on loan to FC Basel)

=== TSV 1860 Munich ===
In:

No.	Pos.	Nation	Player
—	FW	GER	Mustafa Kučuković (from Hamburger SV, previously on loan at SpVgg Greuther Fürth)
—	FW	GER	Markus Schroth (from 1. FC Nürnberg)
—	MF	GER	Daniel Bierofka (from VfB Stuttgart)
—	MF	CAN	Nikolas Ledgerwood (loan return from Wacker Burghausen)
—	FW	TUR	Berkant Göktan (from TSV 1860 Munich II)
—	DF	GER	Benjamin Schwarz (from TSV 1860 Munich II)
—	MF	GER	Timo Gebhart (from TSV 1860 Munich Youth)
—	FW	GER	José Holebas (from TSV 1860 Munich II)

Out:

No.	Pos.	Nation	Player
—	FW	GER	Nicky Adler (to 1. FC Nürnberg)
—	DF	GER	Marcel Schäfer (to VfL Wolfsburg)
—	MF	GER	Daniel Baier (to VfL Wolfsburg)
—	FW	SRB	Nemanja Vucicevic (to 1. FC Köln)
—	MF	GER	Patrick Milchraum (to Alemannia Aachen)
—	GK	GER	Philipp Pentke (to FC Augsburg)
—	FW	AUS	Paul Agostino (to Adelaide United)
—	MF	CZE	Roman Tyce (to SpVgg Unterhaching)
—	MF	AUT	Harald Cerny (retired)

=== Kickers Offenbach ===
In:

No.	Pos.	Nation	Player
—	DF	BRA	Sidney (from FC Energie Cottbus)
—	MF	GER	Daniyel Cimen (from Eintracht Frankfurt, previously on loan at Eintracht Braunschweig)
—	DF	GER	Niko Bungert (from FC Schalke 04)
—	DF	ZAM	Moses Sichone (from Alemannia Aachen)
—	GK	GER	Christian Como (from Kickers Offenbach II)
—	DF	GER	Manuel Hornig (from 1. FC Saarbrücken)
—	DF	CZE	Martin Hyský (from Rot-Weiss Essen)
—	FW	GER	Sean Dundee (loan return from Stuttgarter Kickers)
—	MF	GER	Benjamin Baier (from Kickers Offenbach Youth)
—	MF	NGA	Adebowale Ogungbure (from Sachsen Leipzig)
—	MF	GER	Maximilian Watzka (from Sachsen Leipzig)

Out:

No.	Pos.	Nation	Player
—	MF	GER	Markus Kreuz (to FSV Frankfurt)
—	DF	BIH	Alen Basic (to FK Sarajevo)
—	MF	GER	Christian Pospischil (to Sportfreunde Siegen)
—	MF	GER	Heiner Backhaus (to Valletta F.C.)
—	MF	GER	Alf Mintzel (to SV Sandhausen)
—	DF	GER	Rüdiger Rehm (to FSV Oggersheim)
—	DF	GER	Daniel Schumann (released)
—	DF	GER	Steffen Schrod (SV Viktoria Aschaffenburg)
—	GK	CRO	Ignjac Kresic (retired)
—	DF	GER	Lars Weißenfeldt (to FSV Frankfurt)
—	DF	GER	Markus Happe (to Bayer Leverkusen II)
—	DF	GER	Ramazan Yıldırım (released)
—	DF	SVN	Matej Miljatovic (to Zalaegerszegi TE)
—	FW	GER	Badr Hamdouchi (to Alki Larnaca)

=== VfL Osnabrück ===
In:

No.	Pos.	Nation	Player
—	FW	GER	Rouwen Hennings (on loan from Hamburger SV)
—	DF	TOG	Assimiou Touré (on loan from Bayer Leverkusen)
—	MF	GER	Pierre de Wit (on loan from Bayer Leverkusen)
—	MF	GER	Matthias Heidrich (from Alemannia Aachen)
—	FW	GER	Gaetano Manno (from Wuppertaler SV Borussia)
—	DF	GER	Daniel Flottmann (from VfL Osnabrück II)
—	DF	GER	Marcel Schuon (from VfB Stuttgart II)
—	GK	GER	Tino Berbig (from Dynamo Dresden)
—	MF	GER	Paul Thomik (from SpVgg Unterhaching)
—	MF	GER	Henning Grieneisen (from Holstein Kiel)
—	DF	GER	Uwe Ehlers (from FC Erzgebirge Aue)
—	MF	GHA	Kweky Essien (on loan from FC Maamobi)

Out:

No.	Pos.	Nation	Player
—	FW	COD	Addy-Waku Menga (to F.C. Hansa Rostock)
—	GK	GER	Marian Unger (to 1. FC Magdeburg)
—	MF	GER	Christian Schiffbänker (to VfL Osnabrück II)
—	DF	NED	Dave de Jong (to SV Babberich)
—	GK	GER	Tobias Langemeyer (to SC Lüstringen)
—	MF	GER	Daniel Cartus (to VfB Lübeck)

=== SC Paderborn ===
In:

No.	Pos.	Nation	Player
—	GK	GER	Alexander Bade (from VfL Bochum)
—	DF	GER	Sören Halfar (on loan from Hannover 96)
—	MF	GER	Jan Männer (from Karlsruher SC)
—	DF	GER	Emil Noll (from TuS Koblenz)
—	DF	GEO	David Siradze (from FC Erzgebirge Aue)

Out:

No.	Pos.	Nation	Player
—	GK	GER	Tom Starke (to MSV Duisburg)
—	DF	NED	Roel Brouwers (to Borussia Mönchengladbach)

=== FC St. Pauli ===
In:

No.	Pos.	Nation	Player
—	MF	CZE	Filip Trojan (from VfL Bochum)
—	DF	GER	Ralph Gunesch (from 1. FSV Mainz 05)
—	DF	GER	Jan-Philipp Kalla (from FC St. Pauli II)
—	DF	GER	Jeremy Opoku-Karikari (from FC St. Pauli II)
—	MF	GER	Björn Brunnemann (from Rot-Weiss Ertfurt)
—	FW	GER	Roman Prokoph (from FC St. Pauli II)
—	MF	GER	Alexander Ludwig (from Dynamo Dresden)
—	FW	GER	René Schnitzler (from Borussia Mönchengladbach II)

Out:

No.	Pos.	Nation	Player
—	FW	GER	Clemmens Lange (loan return to F.C. Hansa Rostock II)
—	MF	GER	Hauke Brückner (to Holstein Kiel)
—	FW	GER	Jens Scharping (retired)
—	MF	GER	Jeton Arifi (to FC Energie Cottbus II)
—	MF	COD	Michel Mazingu-Dinzey (to Holstein Kiel)
—	FW	GER	Daniel Stendel (to Hannover 96 II)

=== SV Wehen Wiesbaden ===
In:

No.	Pos.	Nation	Player
—	DF	GER	Benjamin Schöckel (from FC Energie Cottbus)
—	MF	GER	Enis Alushi (from 1. FC Köln)
—	FW	MLI	Bakary Diakité (on loan from 1. FSV Mainz 05)
—	MF	GER	Olivier Caillas (from SpVgg Greuther Fürth)
—	DF	SVN	Ales Kokot (from SpVgg Greuther Fürth)
—	MF	CMR	Carl Lombé (from FC Pyunik)
—	GK	GER	Thomas Richter (from Sportfreunde Siegen)
—	FW	BRA	Rodrigo Teixeira (from Cúcuta Deportivo)
—	MF	ROU	Maximilian Nicu (from Wacker Burghausen)
—	FW	GHA	Valentine Atem (from Eintracht Braunschweig)
—	DF	MNE	Vlado Jeknic (from Wacker Burghausen)
—	MF	GER	Benjamin Siegert (from Eintracht Braunschweig)
—	MF	GER	Patrick Bick (from Eintracht Braunschweig)

Out:

No.	Pos.	Nation	Player
—	MF	NGA	Stephen Kanu Famewo (to Holstein Kiel, previously on loan at SV Wilhelmshaven)
—	DF	GER	Daniel Damm (to SV Wehen Wiesbaden II)
—	FW	GER	Dominik Stroh-Engel (to SV Wehen Wiesbaden II)
—	MF	GER	Daniele Fiorentino (to SV Wehen Wiesbaden II)
—	GK	GER	Christian Adam (to RSV Würges)
—	FW	SRB	Vaselin Popovic (to Sportfreunde Siegen)
—	FW	ITA	Matias Esteban Cenci (to FSV Frankfurt)
—	MF	ECU	Adwin Jorge Rivera Cerezo (to Wuppertaler SV Borussia II)
—	FW	ITA	Marco Calamita (to SC Pfullendorf)
—	MF	GER	Jurij Krause (to 1. FSV Mainz II)
—	FW	GER	Suad Rahmanovic (to FC 08 Villingen)
—	MF	AUT	Benjamin Fuchs (to Eintracht Braunschweig)
—	MF	GER	Thorsten Reuter (to 1. FC Kaiserslautern II)
—	MF	GER	Chihan Yilmaz (released)

== See also ==
- 2007–08 Bundesliga
- 2007–08 2. Bundesliga
- List of German football transfers winter 2007–08
