= 2006–07 FC Energie Cottbus season =

Energie Cottbus
2006–07 season
- Manager: Petrik Sander
- Stadium: Stadion der Freundschaft
- Bundesliga: 13th
- DFB-Pokal: First round
- Top goalscorer: League: Sergiu Radu (14); All: Sergiu Radu (14)

The 2006–07 season was the 41st season in the history of FC Energie Cottbus and the club's first season back in the Bundesliga. Cottbus finished 13th in the Bundesliga, the highest league finish for the club following German reunification, and were eliminated in the first round of the DFB-Pokal.

== Background and pre-season ==
The club were managed by Petrik Sander, who was appointed in November 2004, and delivered promotion to the Bundesliga in his first full season as manager, the 2005–06 season.

== Competitions ==
=== Bundesliga ===
==== League table ====
Pos	Team	Pld	W	D	L	GF	GA	GD	Pts
11	Hannover 96	34	12	8	14	41	50	−9	44
12	Arminia Bielefeld	34	11	9	14	47	49	−2	42
13	Energie Cottbus	34	11	8	15	38	49	−11	41
14	Eintracht Frankfurt	34	9	13	12	46	58	−12	40
15	VfL Wolfsburg	34	8	13	13	37	45	−8	37

Source: kicker.de
Rules for classification: 1) Points; 2) Goal difference; 3) Goals scored

==== Match details ====
Bundesliga match details
Round	Date	Time	Opponent	Venue	Result F–A	Scorers	Attendance	League position	Ref.
1	12 August 2006	15:30	Borussia Mönchengladbach	A	0–2		47,638	15th	
2	19 August 2006	15:30	Hamburger SV	H	2–2	Munteanu 56' pen., Radu 69'	21,000	14th	
3	26 August 2006	15:30	VfL Bochum	A	1–0	da Silva 85'	21,666	10th	
4	16 September 2006	15:30	Mainz 05	H	2–0	Radu 49', Munteanu 60'	13,000	4th	
5	24 September 2006	17:00	1. FC Nürnberg	H	1–1	Baumgart 83'	16,900	6th	
6	30 September 2006	15:30	Arminia Bielefeld	A	1–3	Munteanu 22'	17,543	11th	
7	15 October 2006	17:00	Borussia Dortmund	H	2–3	da Silva 3', Munteanu 89'	19,699	13th	
8	21 October 2006	15:30	Alemannia Aachen	A	2–1	Munteanu 65', Rost 75'	19,873	11th	
9	28 October 2006	15:30	Hertha BSC	H	2–0	Gunkel 66', Shao 83'	17,525	6th	
10	4 November 2006	15:30	Werder Bremen	A	1–1	Kioyo 49'	39,222	7th	
11	8 November 2006	20:00	Eintracht Frankfurt	H	0–1		12,755	11th	
12	11 November 2006	15:30	VfL Wolfsburg	A	0–0		18,641	9th	
13	18 November 2006	15:30	FC Schalke 04	H	2–4	Radu 28', 31'	17,210	10th	
14	26 November 2006	18:00	Bayer Leverkusen	A	1–3	Munteanu 51'	22,500	12th	
15	2 December 2006	15:30	Hannover 96	H	0–1		11,345	13th	
16	9 December 2006	15:30	Bayern Munich	A	1–2	Baumgart 53'	69,000	14th	
17	16 December 2006	15:30	VfB Stuttgart	H	0–0		13,650	15th	
18	27 January 2007	15:30	Borussia Mönchengladbach	H	3–1	Radu 33', 39', Munteanu 89'	13,044	10th	
19	31 January 2007	20:00	Hamburger SV	A	1–1	Radu 9'	52,484	11th	
20	3 February 2007	15:30	VfL Bochum	H	0–0		11,650	12th	
21	10 February 2007	15:30	Mainz 05	A	1–4	Radu 20'	20,000	13th	
22	18 February 2007	17:00	1. FC Nürnberg	A	0–1		40,580	16th	
23	24 February 2007	15:30	Arminia Bielefeld	H	2–1	Kukiełka 62', Radu 66'	12,227	12th	
24	4 March 2007	17:00	Borussia Dortmund	A	3–2	Munteanu 6', 56' pen., Shao 65'	64,100	11th	
25	10 March 2007	15:30	Alemannia Aachen	H	0–2		15,200	14th	
26	16 March 2007	20:30	Hertha BSC	A	1–0	Radu 47'	51,831	11th	
27	31 March 2007	15:30	Werder Bremen	H	0–0		20,344	12th	
28	7 April 2007	15:30	Eintracht Frankfurt	A	3–1	Radu 58', Preuß 76' o.g., Munteanu 90+1'	45,074	8th	
29	14 April 2007	15:30	VfL Wolfsburg	H	3–2	Radu 20', Munteanu 56', Kioyo 57'	16,293	7th	
30	21 April 2007	15:30	FC Schalke 04	A	0–2		61,058	8th	
31	29 April 2007	17:00	Bayer Leverkusen	H	2–1	Radu 7', Gunkel 84'	18,904	8th	
32	4 May 2007	20:30	Hannover 96	A	0–2		43,509	11th	
33	12 May 2007	15:30	Bayern Munich	H	0–3		22,450	13th	
34	19 May 2007	15:30	VfB Stuttgart	A	1–2	Radu 19'	56,000	13th	

=== DFB-Pokal ===
DFB-Pokal match details
Round	Date	Time	Opponent	Venue	Result F–A	Scorers	Attendance	Ref.
First round	9 September 2006	15:30	Rot-Weiss Essen	A	0–1		11,487	

== Players ==
=== Appearances and goals ===
Numbers in parentheses denote appearances as substitute.
Players with names struck through and marked † left the club during the playing season.
Players with names in italics and marked * were on loan from another club for the whole of their season with Darmstadt.
Key to positions: GK – Goalkeeper; DF – Defender; MF – Midfielder; FW – Forward

Players who made at least one appearance
No.	Pos.	Nat.	Name	Bundesliga		DFB-Pokal		Total	
No.	Pos.	Nat.	Name	Apps	Goals	Apps	Goals	Apps	Goals
1	GK	GER	Gerhard Tremmel	1	0	1	0	2	0
2	FW	GER	Steffen Baumgart	12 (21)	2	1	0	13 (21)	2
3	DF	BRA	Sidney	1	0	0	0	1	0
4	DF	CAN	Kevin McKenna	29	0	1	0	30	0
5	DF	POL	Mariusz Kukiełka	32	1	1	0	33	1
6	DF	BRA	Vragel da Silva	21 (4)	2	1	0	22 (4)	2
7	MF	GER	Timo Rost	31	1	0	0	31	1
8	MF	GHA	Lawrence Aidoo	1	0	1	0	2	0
9	FW	CMR	Francis Kioyo	26 (3)	2	1	0	27 (3)	2
10	MF	CRO	Stiven Rivić	0 (7)	0	0	0	0 (7)	0
11	MF	ALB	Ervin Skela	4 (3)	0	0	0	4 (3)	0
14	DF	HUN	Zoltán Szélesi	19 (3)	0	0 (1)	0	19 (4)	0
15	FW	GER	Lars Jungnickel	0 (1)	0	0	0	0 (1)	0
16	MF	ROU	Vlad Munteanu	33	11	0	0	33	11
17	MF	GER	Daniel Ziebig	17 (7)	0	1	0	18 (7)	0
19	DF	GER	Benjamin Schöckel	1	0	0	0	1	0
20	MF	CHN	Shao Jiayi	11 (18)	2	0	0	11 (18)	2
21	MF	POL	Tomasz Bandrowski	4 (8)	0	0	0	4 (8)	0
22	DF	GER	Arne Feick	1 (1)	0	0	0	1 (1)	0
23	GK	BIH	Tomislav Piplica	33	0	0	0	33	0
24	DF	MKD	Igor Mitreski	27	0	1	0	28	0
27	MF	GER	Daniel Gunkel	10 (17)	1	1	0	11 (17)	1
29	FW	ROU	Sergiu Radu	34	14	0	0	34	14
30	FW	GER	Marco Küntzel	9 (7)	0	1	0	10 (7)	0
33	DF	CRO	Mario Cvitanović	17	0	0	0	17	0

=== Transfers ===
==== In ====
Date	Pos.	Player	From	Fee	Ref.

==== Loans in ====
Date from	Pos.	Player	From	Date until	Ref.

==== Out ====
Date	Pos.	Player	To	Fee	Ref.

==== Loans out ====
Date from	Pos.	Player	To	Date until	Ref.
