= Thomas Richter =

Thomas Richter may refer to:

- Thomas Richter (footballer, born 1962), German footballer, played for Holstein Kiel, SSV Ulm 1846, Viktoria Aschaffenburg, Wuppertaler SV and VfB Lübeck, managed Wuppertaler SV
- Thomas Richter (footballer, born 1967), German footballer, won Bundesliga with 1. FC Kaiserslautern and & played for Hertha BSC Berlin, SV Waldhof Mannheim & managed Eintracht Trier
- Thomas Richter (footballer, born 1970), German footballer, played for Stuttgarter Kickers, Greuther Fürth, 1. FC Nuremberg, TSV 1860 München, 1. FC Magdeburg & Bonner SC
- Thomas Richter (footballer, born 1980), German footballer, played for SV Elversberg, SV Darmstadt 98, Sportfreunde Siegen & SV Wehen Wiesbaden
