= Langkamp =

Langkamp is a German surname. Notable people with the surname include:

- Matthias Langkamp (born 1984), German footballer
- Sebastian Langkamp (born 1988), German footballer, brother of Matthias
