= Nils Petersen =

German footballer (born 1988)

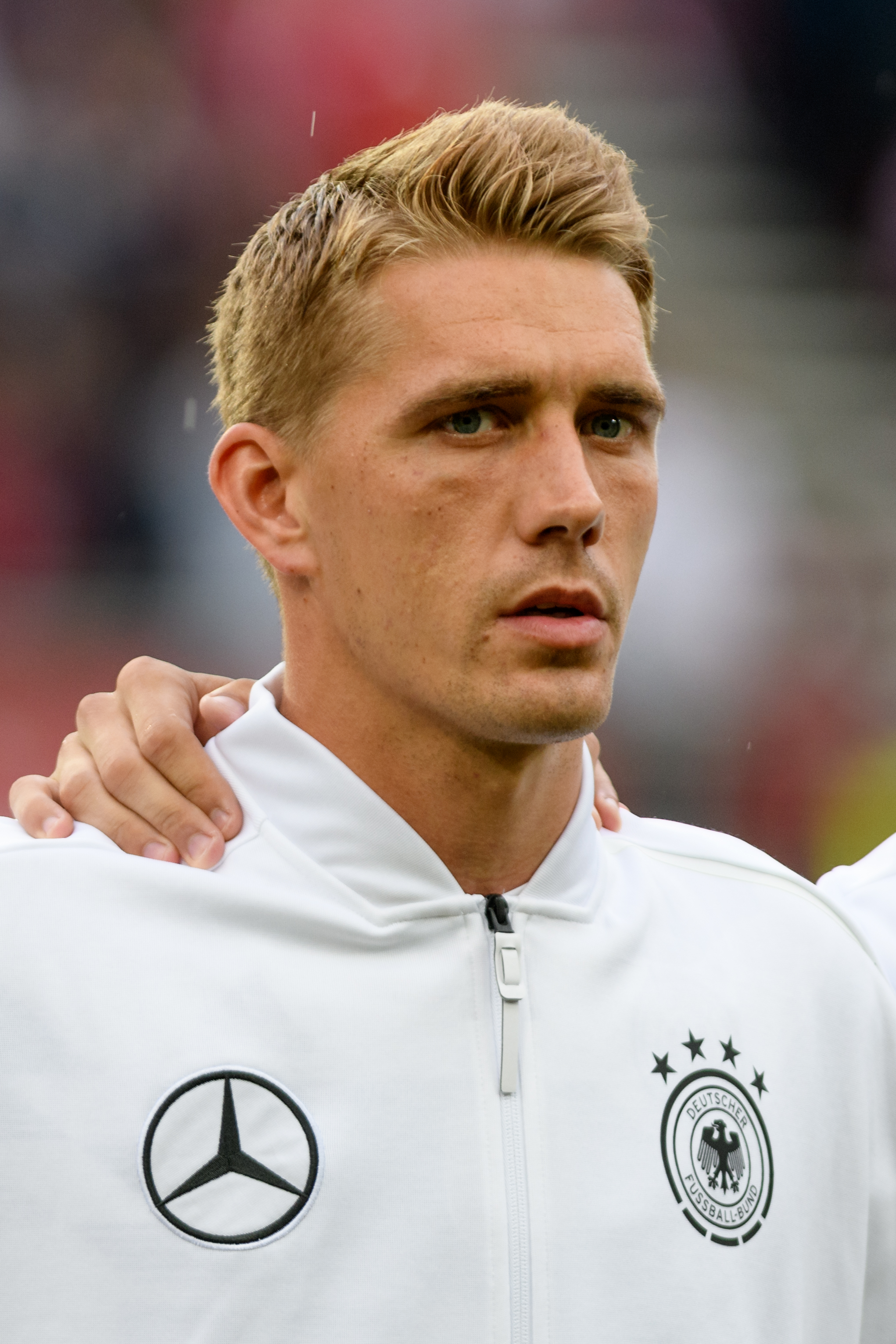
- Petersen with Germany in 2018

Personal information
- Date of birth: 6 December 1988 (age 37)
- Place of birth: Wernigerode, East Germany
- Height: 1.88 m (6 ft 2 in)
- Position: Forward

Youth career
- 1993–1994: FC Einheit Wernigerode
- 1994–2000: 1. FC Wernigerode
- 2000–2001: FC Einheit Wernigerode
- 2001–2004: VfB Germania Halberstadt
- 2005–2006: Carl Zeiss Jena

Senior career*
Years	Team	Apps	(Gls)
2006–2008	Carl Zeiss Jena II	17	(6)
2007–2009	Carl Zeiss Jena	41	(4)
2009	Energie Cottbus II	13	(5)
2009–2011	Energie Cottbus	56	(35)
2011–2013	Bayern Munich	9	(2)
2011–2012	Bayern Munich II	3	(2)
2012–2013	→ Werder Bremen (loan)	34	(11)
2013–2015	Werder Bremen	35	(7)
2015	→ SC Freiburg (loan)	12	(9)
2015–2023	SC Freiburg	236	(81)
2021	SC Freiburg II	1	(0)
Total		457	(162)

International career
2007	Germany U19	4	(2)
2007–2008	Germany U20	3	(0)
2009	Germany U21	2	(0)
2016	Germany Olympic	6	(6)
2018	Germany	2	(0)
Medal record
Olympic Games
Silver medal – second place	2016 Rio de Janeiro	Team
- * Club domestic league appearances and goals

Nils Petersen (German pronunciation: [ˈniːls ˈpeːtɐzn̩, ˈnɪls -]; born 6 December 1988) is a German former professional footballer who played as a forward. He appeared in the 2016 Summer Olympics and remains the first and only German footballer who has scored five goals in a single game with the national team.

At club level, Petersen played in the Bundesliga for Energie Cottbus, Bayern Munich, Werder Bremen and SC Freiburg.

== Youth ==
Petersen spent his early youth developing at hometown club FC Einheit in Wernigerode and afterward continued his development at VfB Germania in Halberstadt. Later he attended the Sport School Jena, playing in their youth team, eventually leaving during the summer of 2007.

== Club career ==
=== Carl Zeiss Jena ===
In February 2005, Carl Zeiss Jena signed Petersen to a youth contract, before promoting him to the First Team in January 2007. Before promotion to the first team, Petersen had already gained experience playing with the reserves playing in the Oberliga. Petersen made his professional debut on 4 February 2007 (20th matchday), in a 1–0 loss in an away match against 1. FC Köln. He entered the match in the 89th minute as a substitute for Mohammed El Berkani.

In future matches, he would serve as a "super-sub" coming off the bench to score decisive goals against Alemannia Aachen, Erzgebirge Aue, 1. FC Kaiserslautern, and FC Augsburg. Jena suffered relegation in the spring of 2008 so in the beginning of the 2008-09 season he appeared in the 3. Liga for the Thuringian club.

=== Energie Cottbus ===
On 6 January 2009, Petersen switched to Energie Cottbus. In his first season with the club, he made an appearance in the Bundesliga and the relegation playoff. He premiered for Cottbus on the final match-day of the season in a 3–0 home victory over Bayer Leverkusen, on 23 May 2009. Cottbus, finishing 16th in their Bundesliga campaign, would go on to lose in the relegation/promotion playoff against 2nd division 1. FC Nürnberg, resulting in Cottbus' relegation to 2. Bundesliga. During the first half of the 2009–10 season, Petersen rarely saw playing time for Cottbus. After the winter break, his playing time increased as he was able to score nine goals in 14 appearances, securing his place in the starting line-up.

During the 2010–11 campaign, Petersen would become the 2. Bundesliga top goalscorer, notching 25 goals in 33 appearances, helping Cottbus to a mid-table finish. In February 2011, despite interest from various Bundesliga clubs, he decided to extend his existing contract by two years until June 2014.

=== Bayern Munich ===
On 19 May 2011, FC Bayern Munich reported the signing of Petersen to a three-year contract until 30 June 2014. Nils Petersen scored his first hat-trick (three goals) in the first ever game he played for FC Bayern Munich against a Trentino Selection. On 10 September 2011, having been on for just 17 minutes, Petersen came close twice, and finally scored his first Bundesliga goal against Freiburg.

=== Werder Bremen ===
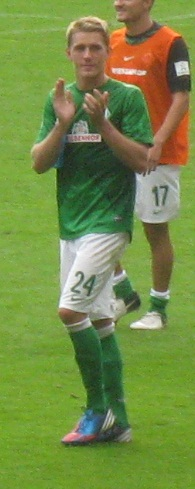
Petersen playing for Werder Bremen in 2012

On 29 June 2012, SV Werder Bremen agreed to a one-year loan deal with Bayern Munich for Petersen. After a successful season on loan at Werder, it was announced on 23 May 2013 that he had penned a four-year contract with the club for an undisclosed fee.

=== SC Freiburg ===
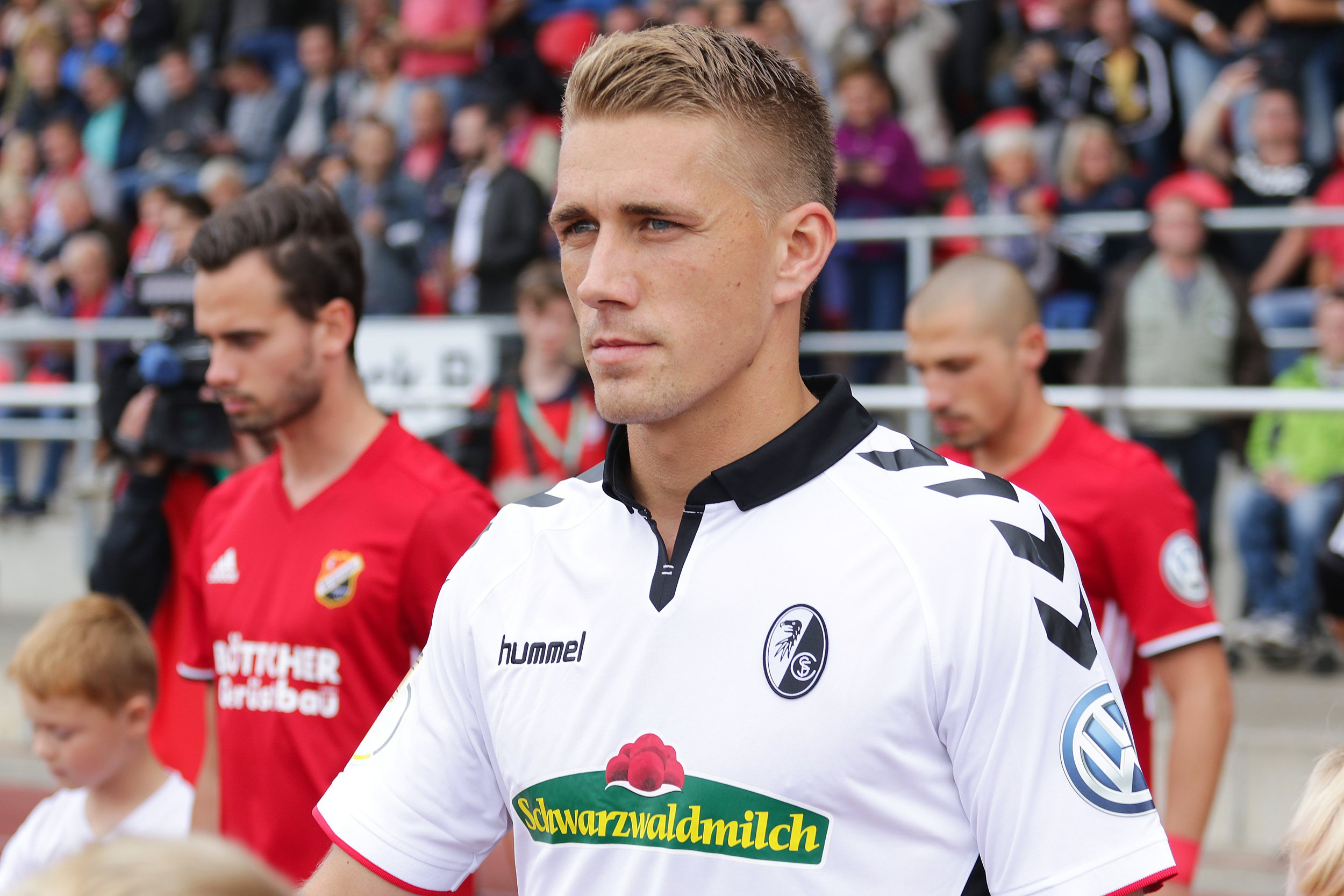
Petersen playing for Freiburg, 2017

After having only earned seven caps and most of them as a substitute during the first half of the 2014–15 season, Petersen was loaned to SC Freiburg for the second leg of the campaign. On 31 January 2015, in his league debut versus Eintracht Frankfurt, he scored a hat-trick, despite just coming on as a substitute for the second half, ultimately helping his team turning a 0–1 deficit into a 4–1 victory. He subsequently made appearances on matchdays 19 and 20. Christian Streich, Freiburg's head coach, stated that Petersen was "an option for the squad." He finished the 2014–15 season by scoring nine goals in 12 matches for Freiburg.

On 28 June 2015, Petersen joined newly relegated Freiburg on a permanent deal, for an undisclosed fee. On 27 July 2015, he marked his season debut by scoring a hat-trick in a 6–3 victory over 1. FC Nürnberg. On 9 August 2015, he continued his good form by scoring his second hat-trick in three games, in a 5–0 win at fifth-tier side HSV Barmbek-Uhlenhorst in the first round of the DFB-Pokal. He finished the 2015–16 season by scoring 25 goals in 34 matches.

Petersen made his 100th top flight appearance on 29 October 2016 by coming on in the second half of the 3–1 away win against his former side Werder Bremen. He scored his first Bundesliga hat-trick later on 10 December 2017, including two penalties in the injury time, in the 4–3 win at 1. FC Köln.

In the 2017–18 season, Petersen was the top scoring German in the Bundesliga with 15 goals, finishing second to only Robert Lewandowski of Bayern Munich. On 19 January 2019, he scored his 38th league goal for Freiburg, breaking the club's all-time Bundesliga goalscoring record previously held by Papiss Cissé.

On 29 March 2023, Petersen announced his retirement from professional football at the end of the 2022–23 Bundesliga season at the age of 34. After coming on as a substitute, he scored in his final home game for the club in a 2–0 win over Wolfsburg on 19 May 2023.

== International career ==
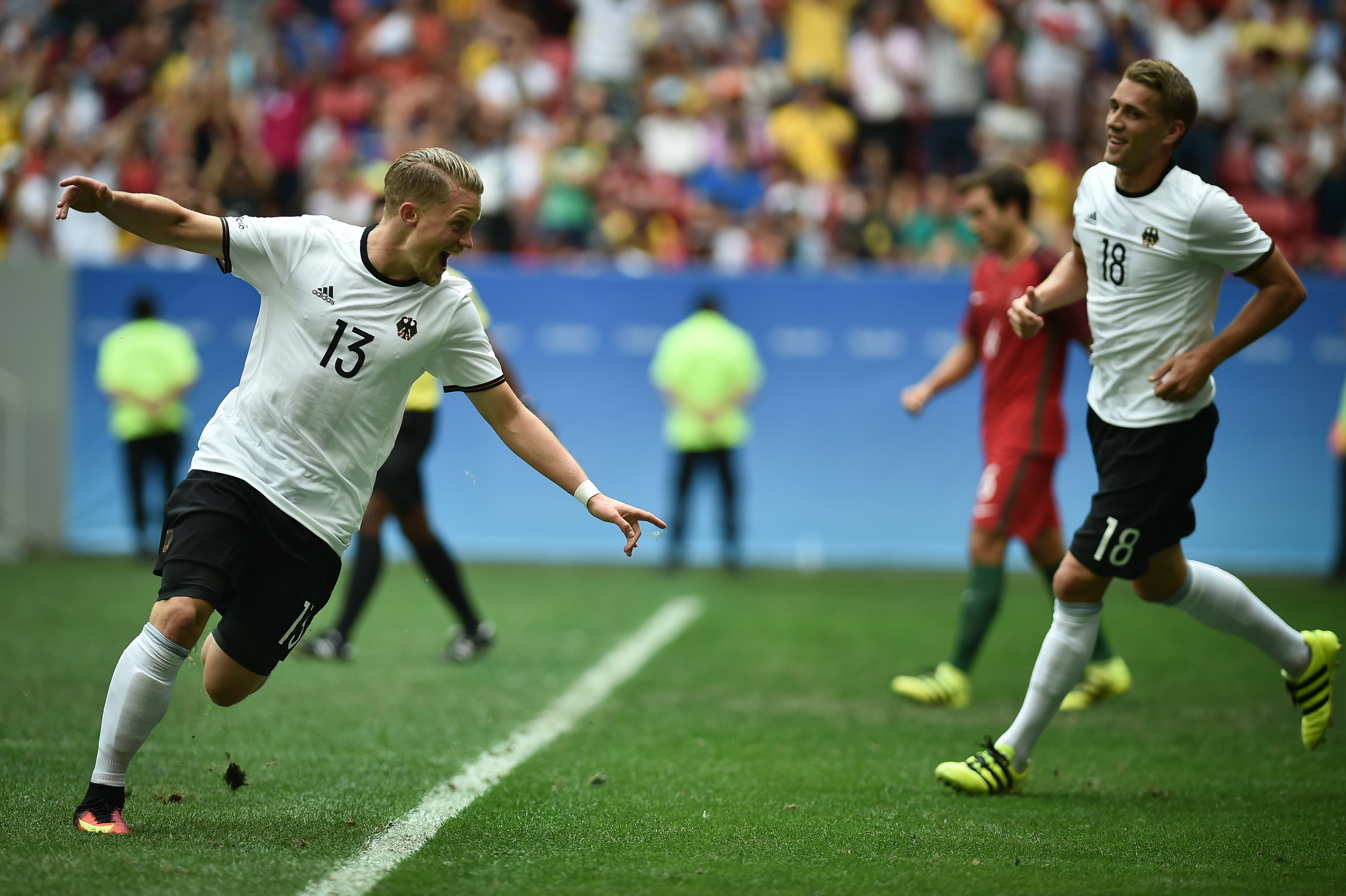
Petersen (right) celebrating a goal

Petersen was a member of the Germany U19, scoring a goal against Russia during the UEFA U-19 European Championship and the Germany U20, before being called up on 6 August 2009 for the German U21.

Petersen was part of Germany Olympic Squad for Rio's Olympic along with Lars and Sven Bender as one of three allowed players over the age of 23. On 4 August 2016, he came on as a substitute in the 84th minute for Davie Selke in a 2–2 draw. Three days later, in the 83rd minute, he was again substituted on for Selke. On 10 August 2016, he started and scored five goals in a 10–0 win against Fiji. On 13 August 2016, against Portugal, he again replaced Selke, in the 78th minute. On 17 August 2016, in the semi-final against Nigeria, Petersen came on for Max Meyer in the 84th minute and scored his sixth goal of the tournament five minutes later. On 20 August 2016, Petersen entered the pitch as a 76th-minute substitute for Selke in the Gold medal match. He was the only player who failed to score in the shootout in the gold medal match, and Germany won the silver medal.

On 15 May 2018, he was named in Germany's provisional 2018 FIFA World Cup squad. Petersen was then handed his first cap in a friendly versus Austria on 2 June in preparation for the World Cup, but was left off of Löw's final squad for the tournament. His second and final international cap was won in September 2018 after the World Cup.

== Career statistics ==
=== Club ===
Appearances and goals by club, season and competition
Club	Season	League			DFB-Pokal		Europe		Other		Total	
Club	Season	Division	Apps	Goals	Apps	Goals	Apps	Goals	Apps	Goals	Apps	Goals
Carl Zeiss Jena	2006–07	2. Bundesliga	3	0	0	0	—		—		3	0
Carl Zeiss Jena	2007–08	2. Bundesliga	20	4	4	1	—		—		24	5
Carl Zeiss Jena	2008–09	3. Liga	18	0	2	1	—		—		20	1
Carl Zeiss Jena	Total		41	4	6	2	0	0	0	0	47	6
Carl Zeiss Jena II	2006–07	NOFV-Oberliga Süd	5	1	—		—		—		5	1
Carl Zeiss Jena II	2007–08	NOFV-Oberliga Süd	12	5	—		—		—		12	5
Carl Zeiss Jena II	Total		17	6	0	0	0	0	0	0	17	6
Energie Cottbus II	2008–09	Regionalliga Nord	13	5	—		—		—		13	5
Energie Cottbus	2008–09	Bundesliga	1	0	0	0	—		1 (Note: Appearance in Bundesliga relegation play-offs)	0	2	0
Energie Cottbus	2009–10	2. Bundesliga	22	10	1	0	—		—		23	10
Energie Cottbus	2010–11	2. Bundesliga	33	25	5	3	—		—		38	28
Energie Cottbus	Total		56	35	6	3	0	0	1	0	63	38
Bayern Munich	2011–12	Bundesliga	9	2	2	2	4 (Note: Appearances in UEFA Champions League)	0	—		15	4
Bayern Munich II	2011–12	Regionalliga Süd	3	2	—		—		—		3	2
Werder Bremen (loan)	2012–13	Bundesliga	34	11	1	0	—		—		35	11
Werder Bremen	2013–14	Bundesliga	28	7	1	0	—		—		29	7
Werder Bremen	2014–15	Bundesliga	7	0	1	0	—		—		8	0
Werder Bremen	Total		69	18	3	0	0	0	0	0	72	18
SC Freiburg (loan)	2014–15	Bundesliga	12	9	0	0	—		—		12	9
SC Freiburg	2015–16	2. Bundesliga	32	21	2	4	—		—		34	25
SC Freiburg	2016–17	Bundesliga	33	10	1	1	—		—		34	11
SC Freiburg	2017–18	Bundesliga	32	15	3	3	2 (Note: Appearances in UEFA Europa League)	1	—		37	19
SC Freiburg	2018–19	Bundesliga	24	10	2	2	—		—		26	12
SC Freiburg	2019–20	Bundesliga	34	11	2	0	—		—		36	11
SC Freiburg	2020–21	Bundesliga	32	8	2	0	—		—		34	8
SC Freiburg	2021–22	Bundesliga	22	5	4	2	—		—		26	7
SC Freiburg	2022–23	Bundesliga	27	1	4	1	7	1	—		38	3
SC Freiburg	Total		248	90	20	13	9	2	0	0	277	105
SC Freiburg II	2021–22	3. Liga	1	0	—		—		—		1	0
Career total			457	162	37	20	13	2	1	0	512	180

=== International ===
Appearances and goals by national team and year
National team	Year	Apps	Goals
Germany	2018	2	0
Total		2	0

== Honours ==
Germany

- Summer Olympic Games silver medalist: 2016

Individual

- Olympic Games top scorer: 2016
