= 2007–08 Bundesliga =

45th season of the Bundesliga

Bundesliga
- Season: 2007–08
- Dates: 10 August 2007 – 17 May 2008
- Champions: Bayern Munich; 20th Bundesliga title 21st German title
- Runner up: Werder Bremen
- Relegated: 1. FC Nürnberg; Hansa Rostock; MSV Duisburg
- Champions League: Bayern Munich; Werder Bremen; Schalke 04
- UEFA Cup: Hamburger SV; VfL Wolfsburg; Borussia Dortmund (via domestic cup); Hertha BSC (via Fair Play)
- Intertoto Cup: VfB Stuttgart
- Matches: 306
- Goals: 860 (2.81 per match)
- Top goalscorer: Luca Toni (24)
- Biggest home win: Bremen 8–1 Bielefeld (29 September 2007); Hamburg 7–0 Karlsruhe (17 May 2008)
- Biggest away win: Bremen 0–4 Bayern (18 August 2007)
- Highest scoring: Bremen 8–1 Bielefeld (29 September 2007); Stuttgart 6–3 Bremen (8 March 2008)
- Average attendance: 37,644

The 2007–08 Bundesliga was the 45th season of the Bundesliga, Germany's premier football league. It began on 10 August 2007 and ended on 17 May 2008. VfB Stuttgart were the defending champions.

== Competition format ==
Every team played two games against each other team, one at home and one away. Teams received three points for a win and one point for a draw. If two or more teams were tied on points, places were determined by goal difference and, if still tied, by goals scored. The team with the most points were crowned champions while the three teams with the fewest points were relegated to 2. Bundesliga.

== Background ==
Bayern Munich secured their 21st title with a 0–0 draw at VfL Wolfsburg on 4 May 2008. Bayern conceded only 21 goals, and lost 2 games. Their completely overhauled squad hinged on the performances of Italy striker Luca Toni, who scored 24 goals, and France winger Franck Ribéry, who won the Player of the Year award. Bayern coach Ottmar Hitzfeld was named Manager of the Year. Werder Bremen finished their first season without Miroslav Klose on 66 points, ten points behind Bayern, in second place. Schalke 04 finished in the last Champions League place, two points behind Bremen. Joining Hamburger SV in the UEFA Cup spot were season surprise packages Wolfsburg, who finished in fifth place. Borussia Dortmund, despite finishing 13th, managed to qualify for the UEFA Cup as well, having been runners-up in the DFB-Pokal final, losing to Bayern Munich. 1. FC Nürnberg, MSV Duisburg and Hansa Rostock were all automatically relegated, having suffered a combined 58 defeats in the campaign.

== Teams ==
Mainz 05, Alemannia Aachen and Borussia Mönchengladbach were relegated to the 2. Bundesliga after finishing in the last three places. They were replaced by Karlsruher SC, Hansa Rostock and MSV Duisburg.

2007–08 teams

- Hertha BSC
- Arminia Bielefeld
- VfL Bochum
- SV Werder Bremen
- Energie Cottbus
- Borussia Dortmund
- MSV Duisburg (2006–07 2. Bundesliga third place)
- Eintracht Frankfurt
- Hamburger SV
- Hannover 96
- Karlsruher SC (2006–07 2. Bundesliga winner)
- Bayer Leverkusen
- Bayern Munich
- 1. FC Nürnberg
- Hansa Rostock (2006–07 2. Bundesliga runner-up)
- Schalke 04
- VfB Stuttgart
- VfL Wolfsburg

=== Stadia and locations ===
Location of teams in the 2007–08 Bundesliga

| Team | Location | Venue | Capacity |
|---|---|---|---|
| Hertha BSC | Berlin | Olympic Stadium | 74,228 |
| Arminia Bielefeld | Bielefeld | Schüco Arena | 28,008 |
| VfL Bochum | Bochum | Ruhrstadion | 31,328 |
| SV Werder Bremen | Bremen | Weserstadion | 42,358 |
| FC Energie Cottbus | Cottbus | Stadion der Freundschaft | 22,450 |
| Borussia Dortmund | Dortmund | Signal Iduna Park | 80,708 |
| MSV Duisburg | Duisburg | MSV-Arena | 31,500 |
| Eintracht Frankfurt | Frankfurt | Commerzbank-Arena | 52,300 |
| Hamburger SV | Hamburg | HSH Nordbank Arena | 57,274 |
| Hannover 96 | Hanover | AWD-Arena | 49,000 |
| Karlsruher SC | Karlsruhe | Wildparkstadion | 32,306 |
| Bayer 04 Leverkusen | Leverkusen | BayArena | 22,500 |
| FC Bayern Munich | Munich | Allianz Arena | 69,901 |
| 1. FC Nürnberg | Nuremberg | Easy Credit Stadion | 47,559 |
| F.C. Hansa Rostock | Rostock | DKB-Arena | 29,000 |
| FC Schalke 04 | Gelsenkirchen | Veltins-Arena | 61,673 |
| VfB Stuttgart | Stuttgart | Gottlieb-Daimler-Stadion | 58,000 |
| VfL Wolfsburg | Wolfsburg | Volkswagen Arena | 30,122 |

=== Personnel and kits ===
| Team | Manager | Captain | Kit manufacturer | Shirt sponsor |
|---|---|---|---|---|
| Hertha BSC | (Switzerland) Lucien Favre | (Germany) Arne Friedrich | Nike | DB |
| Arminia Bielefeld | (Germany) Michael Frontzeck | (Germany) Mathias Hain | Saller | Krombacher |
| VfL Bochum | (Switzerland) Marcel Koller | (Poland) Tomasz Zdebel | Umbro | KiK |
| SV Werder Bremen | (Germany) Thomas Schaaf | (Germany) Frank Baumann | Kappa | Citibank |
| FC Energie Cottbus | (Slovenia) Bojan Prašnikar | (Germany) Timo Rost | Saller | enviaM |
| Borussia Dortmund | (Germany) Thomas Doll | (Germany) Christian Wörns | Nike | Evonik |
| MSV Duisburg | (Germany) Rudi Bommer | (Bosnia and Herzegovina) Ivica Grlić | Uhlsport | Xella |
| Eintracht Frankfurt | (Germany) Friedhelm Funkel | (Greece) Giannis Amanatidis | Jako | Fraport |
| Hamburger SV | (Netherlands) Huub Stevens | (Netherlands) Rafael van der Vaart | Adidas | Emirates |
| Hannover 96 | (Germany) Dieter Hecking | (Germany) Robert Enke | Diadora | TUIfly |
| Karlsruher SC | (Germany) Edmund Becker | (Switzerland) Mario Eggimann | Jako | EnBW |
| Bayer 04 Leverkusen | (Germany) Michael Skibbe | (Germany) Carsten Ramelow | Adidas | Teldafax |
| FC Bayern Munich | (Germany) Ottmar Hitzfeld | (Germany) Oliver Kahn | Adidas | T-Home |
| 1. FC Nürnberg | (Germany) Thomas von Heesen | (Czech Republic) Tomáš Galásek | Adidas | mister*lady |
| FC Hansa Rostock | (Germany) Frank Pagelsdorf | (Germany) Stefan Beinlich | Masita | KiK |
| FC Schalke 04 | (Germany) Mike Büskens (Netherlands) Youri Mulder | (Brazil) Marcelo Bordon | Adidas | Gazprom |
| VfB Stuttgart | (Germany) Armin Veh | (Portugal) Fernando Meira | Puma | EnBW |
| VfL Wolfsburg | (Germany) Felix Magath | (Brazil) Marcelinho | Nike | Volkswagen/Tiguan/Ein Herz für Kinder |

=== Managerial changes ===
| Team | Outgoing manager | Date of departure | Replaced by | Date of Appointment |
|---|---|---|---|---|
| Hertha BSC | (Germany) Karsten Heine | 19 May 2007 | (Switzerland) Lucien Favre | 1 July 2007 |
| VfL Wolfsburg | (Germany) Klaus Augenthaler | 19 May 2007 | (Germany) Felix Magath | 1 July 2007 |
| Energie Cottbus | (Germany) Petrik Sander | 23 September 2007 | (Slovenia) Bojan Prašnikar | 28 September 2007 |
| Arminia Bielefeld | (Germany) Ernst Middendorp | 10 December 2007 | (Germany) Michael Frontzeck | 1 January 2008 |
| FC Schalke 04 | (Germany) Mirko Slomka | 13 April 2008 | (Germany) Mike Büskens (Netherlands) Youri Mulder | 14 April 2008 |

== League table ==
| Pos | Team | Pld | W | D | L | GF | GA | GD | Pts | Qualification or relegation |
|---|---|---|---|---|---|---|---|---|---|---|
| 1 | Bayern Munich (C) | 34 | 22 | 10 | 2 | 68 | 21 | +47 | 76 | Qualification to Champions League group stage |
| 2 | Werder Bremen | 34 | 20 | 6 | 8 | 75 | 45 | +30 | 66 | Qualification to Champions League group stage |
| 3 | Schalke 04 | 34 | 18 | 10 | 6 | 55 | 32 | +23 | 64 | Qualification to Champions League third qualifying round |
| 4 | Hamburger SV | 34 | 14 | 12 | 8 | 47 | 26 | +21 | 54 | Qualification to UEFA Cup first round |
| 5 | VfL Wolfsburg | 34 | 15 | 9 | 10 | 58 | 46 | +12 | 54 | Qualification to UEFA Cup first round |
| 6 | VfB Stuttgart | 34 | 16 | 4 | 14 | 57 | 57 | 0 | 52 | Qualification to Intertoto Cup third round |
| 7 | Bayer Leverkusen | 34 | 15 | 6 | 13 | 57 | 40 | +17 | 51 | |
| 8 | Hannover 96 | 34 | 13 | 10 | 11 | 54 | 56 | −2 | 49 | |
| 9 | Eintracht Frankfurt | 34 | 12 | 10 | 12 | 43 | 50 | −7 | 46 | |
| 10 | Hertha BSC | 34 | 12 | 8 | 14 | 39 | 44 | −5 | 44 | Qualification to UEFA Cup first qualifying round (Note: An additional UEFA Cup spot was awarded to the Bundesliga after it had been drawn from the best teams of the UEFA Fair Play ranking 2007–08. The spot was awarded to national Fair Play competition winners Hertha BSC.) |
| 11 | Karlsruher SC | 34 | 11 | 10 | 13 | 38 | 53 | −15 | 43 | |
| 12 | VfL Bochum | 34 | 10 | 11 | 13 | 48 | 54 | −6 | 41 | |
| 13 | Borussia Dortmund | 34 | 10 | 10 | 14 | 50 | 62 | −12 | 40 | Qualification to UEFA Cup first round (Note: Because German Cup 2007–08 winners Bayern Munich had already qualified for the Champions League via their league placement, losing finalists Borussia Dortmund took the UEFA Cup spot reserved for the cup winners.) |
| 14 | Energie Cottbus | 34 | 9 | 9 | 16 | 35 | 56 | −21 | 36 | |
| 15 | Arminia Bielefeld | 34 | 8 | 10 | 16 | 35 | 60 | −25 | 34 | |
| 16 | 1. FC Nürnberg (R) | 34 | 7 | 10 | 17 | 35 | 51 | −16 | 31 | Relegation to 2. Bundesliga |
| 17 | Hansa Rostock (R) | 34 | 8 | 6 | 20 | 30 | 52 | −22 | 30 | Relegation to 2. Bundesliga |
| 18 | MSV Duisburg (R) | 34 | 8 | 5 | 21 | 36 | 55 | −19 | 29 | Relegation to 2. Bundesliga |

Source: www.dfb.de
Rules for classification: 1) points; 2) goal difference; 3) number of goals scored.
(C) Champions; (R) Relegated

== Results ==
| Home \ Away | BSC | DSC | BOC | SVW | FCE | BVB | DUI | SGE | HSV | H96 | KSC | B04 | FCB | FCN | ROS | S04 | VFB | WOB |
|---|---|---|---|---|---|---|---|---|---|---|---|---|---|---|---|---|---|---|
| Hertha BSC | — | 1–0 | 2–0 | 1–2 | 0–0 | 3–2 | 2–0 | 0–3 | 0–0 | 1–0 | 3–1 | 0–3 | 0–0 | 1–0 | 1–3 | 1–2 | 3–1 | 2–1 |
| Arminia Bielefeld | 2–0 | — | 2–0 | 1–1 | 1–1 | 2–2 | 0–2 | 2–2 | 0–1 | 0–2 | 1–0 | 1–0 | 0–1 | 3–1 | 4–2 | 0–2 | 2–0 | 0–1 |
| VfL Bochum | 1–1 | 3–0 | — | 2–2 | 3–3 | 3–3 | 1–1 | 0–0 | 2–1 | 2–1 | 2–2 | 2–0 | 1–2 | 3–3 | 1–2 | 0–3 | 1–1 | 5–3 |
| Werder Bremen | 3–2 | 8–1 | 1–2 | — | 2–0 | 2–0 | 1–2 | 2–1 | 2–1 | 6–1 | 4–0 | 5–2 | 0–4 | 2–0 | 1–0 | 5–1 | 4–1 | 0–1 |
| Energie Cottbus | 2–1 | 1–0 | 1–2 | 0–2 | — | 0–2 | 1–2 | 2–2 | 2–0 | 5–1 | 2–0 | 2–3 | 2–0 | 1–1 | 2–1 | 1–0 | 0–1 | 1–2 |
| Borussia Dortmund | 1–1 | 6–1 | 2–1 | 3–0 | 3–0 | — | 1–3 | 1–1 | 0–3 | 1–3 | 1–1 | 2–1 | 0–0 | 0–0 | 1–0 | 2–3 | 3–2 | 2–4 |
| MSV Duisburg | 1–2 | 3–0 | 0–2 | 1–3 | 0–1 | 3–3 | — | 0–1 | 0–1 | 1–1 | 0–1 | 3–2 | 2–3 | 1–0 | 1–1 | 0–2 | 2–3 | 1–3 |
| Eintracht Frankfurt | 1–0 | 2–1 | 1–1 | 1–0 | 2–1 | 1–1 | 4–2 | — | 2–1 | 0–0 | 0–1 | 2–1 | 1–3 | 1–3 | 1–0 | 2–2 | 1–4 | 2–3 |
| Hamburger SV | 2–1 | 1–1 | 3–0 | 0–1 | 0–0 | 1–0 | 0–1 | 4–1 | — | 1–1 | 7–0 | 1–0 | 1–1 | 1–0 | 2–0 | 0–1 | 4–1 | 2–2 |
| Hannover 96 | 2–2 | 2–2 | 3–2 | 4–3 | 4–0 | 2–1 | 2–1 | 2–1 | 0–1 | — | 2–2 | 0–3 | 0–3 | 2–1 | 3–0 | 2–3 | 0–0 | 2–2 |
| Karlsruher SC | 2–1 | 0–0 | 1–3 | 3–3 | 1–1 | 3–1 | 1–0 | 0–1 | 1–1 | 1–2 | — | 2–2 | 1–4 | 2–0 | 1–2 | 0–0 | 1–0 | 3–1 |
| Bayer Leverkusen | 1–2 | 4–0 | 2–0 | 0–1 | 0–0 | 2–2 | 4–1 | 0–2 | 1–1 | 2–0 | 3–0 | — | 0–1 | 4–1 | 3–0 | 1–0 | 3–0 | 2–2 |
| Bayern Munich | 4–1 | 2–0 | 3–1 | 1–1 | 5–0 | 5–0 | 0–0 | 0–0 | 1–1 | 3–0 | 2–0 | 2–1 | — | 3–0 | 3–0 | 1–1 | 4–1 | 2–1 |
| 1. FC Nürnberg | 2–1 | 2–2 | 1–1 | 0–1 | 1–1 | 2–0 | 2–0 | 5–1 | 0–0 | 2–2 | 0–2 | 1–2 | 1–1 | — | 1–1 | 0–2 | 0–1 | 1–0 (Note: The 1. FC Nürnberg v VfL Wolfsburg match from 11 April 2008 was suspended after 45 minutes (half-time) and a score of 1–0 due to poor playing conditions caused by heavy rain. The replay took place on 20 April 2008 and finished with a score of 1–0.) |
| Hansa Rostock | 0–0 | 1–1 | 2–0 | 1–2 | 3–2 | 0–1 | 2–0 | 1–0 | 1–3 | 0–3 | 0–0 | 1–2 | 1–2 | 1–2 | — | 1–1 | 2–1 | 0–1 |
| Schalke 04 | 1–0 | 3–0 | 1–0 | 1–1 | 5–0 | 4–1 | 2–1 | 1–0 | 1–1 | 1–1 | 0–2 | 1–1 | 0–1 | 2–1 | 1–0 | — | 4–1 | 1–2 |
| VfB Stuttgart | 1–3 | 2–2 | 1–0 | 6–3 | 3–0 | 1–2 | 1–0 | 4–1 | 1–0 | 0–2 | 3–1 | 1–0 | 3–1 | 3–0 | 4–1 | 2–2 | — | 3–1 |
| VfL Wolfsburg | 0–0 | 1–3 | 0–1 | 1–1 | 3–0 | 4–0 | 2–1 | 2–2 | 1–1 | 3–2 | 1–2 | 1–2 | 0–0 | 3–1 | 1–0 | 1–1 | 4–0 | — |

Source: DFB
Legend: Blue = home team win; Yellow = draw; Red = away team win.

== Statistics ==
=== Top goalscorers ===
Source: www.kicker.de (in German)

| Rank | Player | Club | Goals |
|---|---|---|---|
| 1 | (Italy) Luca Toni | Bayern Munich | 24 |
| 2 | (Germany) Mario Gómez | VfB Stuttgart | 19 |
| 3 | (Germany) Kevin Kurányi | Schalke 04 | 15 |
| 4 | (Croatia) Ivica Olić | Hamburger SV | 14 |
| 4 | (Sweden) Markus Rosenberg | Werder Bremen | 14 |
| 6 | (Brazil) Diego | Werder Bremen | 13 |
| 6 | (Serbia) Marko Pantelić | Hertha BSC | 13 |
| 6 | (Croatia) Mladen Petrić | Borussia Dortmund | 13 |
| 6 | (Slovakia) Stanislav Šesták | VfL Bochum | 13 |
| 10 | (Netherlands) Rafael van der Vaart | Hamburger SV | 12 |

== Awards ==
=== Annual awards ===
Player of the Year: (France) Franck Ribéry (Bayern Munich)

Manager of the Year: (Germany) Ottmar Hitzfeld (Bayern Munich)

=== Monthly awards ===
Player of the Month

| Month | Player | Team |
|---|---|---|
| August | (France) Franck Ribéry | Bayern Munich |
| September | (Brazil) Diego | Werder Bremen |
| October | (Croatia) Ivica Olić | Hamburger SV |
| November | (Germany) Thomas Hitzlsperger | VfB Stuttgart |
| December | (Brazil) Diego | Werder Bremen |
| February | (Australia) Joshua Kennedy | Karlsruher SC |
| March | (Germany) Mario Gómez | VfB Stuttgart |
| April | (Germany) Kevin Kurányi | FC Schalke 04 |
| May | (Germany) Torsten Frings | Werder Bremen |

=== Team of the Season ===
Team of the Season
| Goalkeeper | (Germany) René Adler (Bayer Leverkusen) | | | |
| Defence | (Brazil) Naldo (Werder Bremen) | (Argentina) Martín Demichelis (Bayern Munich) | (Brazil) Marcelo Bordon (Schalke 04) | (Germany) Per Mertesacker (Werder Bremen) |
| Midfield | (Brazil) Diego (Werder Bremen) | (Brazil) Zé Roberto (Bayern Munich) | (Germany) Simon Rolfes (Bayer Leverkusen) | (France) Franck Ribéry (Bayern Munich) |
| Attack | (Germany) Mario Gómez (VfB Stuttgart) | | (Italy) Luca Toni (Bayern Munich) | |

== Attendances ==
| No. | Team | Average | Change | Highest |
|---|---|---|---|---|
| 1 | Borussia Dortmund | 72,510 | -0,2% | 80,708 |
| 2 | Bayern München | 69,000 | 0,9% | 69,000 |
| 3 | Schalke 04 | 61,274 | -0,1% | 61,482 |
| 4 | Hamburger SV | 55,120 | -1,6% | 57,000 |
| 5 | VfB Stuttgart | 50,706 | 10,5% | 57,500 |
| 6 | Eintracht Frankfurt | 48,300 | 1,4% | 51,500 |
| 7 | Hertha BSC | 45,482 | -6,6% | 74,220 |
| 8 | 1. FC Nürnberg | 43,470 | 4,6% | 46,780 |
| 9 | Werder Bremen | 40,267 | -1,5% | 42,100 |
| 10 | Hannover 96 | 40,233 | 3,9% | 49,000 |
| 11 | Karlsruher SC | 28,840 | 16,5% | 30,702 |
| 12 | MSV Duisburg | 25,041 | 38,9% | 31,500 |
| 13 | VfL Wolfsburg | 24,407 | 9,3% | 30,000 |
| 14 | VfL Bochum | 24,399 | -2,3% | 31,328 |
| 15 | Bayer Leverkusen | 22,471 | 0,3% | 22,500 |
| 16 | Arminia Bielefeld | 21,518 | -7,0% | 27,400 |
| 17 | Hansa Rostock | 20,353 | 4,8% | 29,000 |
| 18 | Energie Cottbus | 16,598 | 3,3% | 22,746 |

== See also ==
- List of German football transfers summer 2007
- List of German football transfers winter 2007–08
