= Benjamin Barg =

German footballer

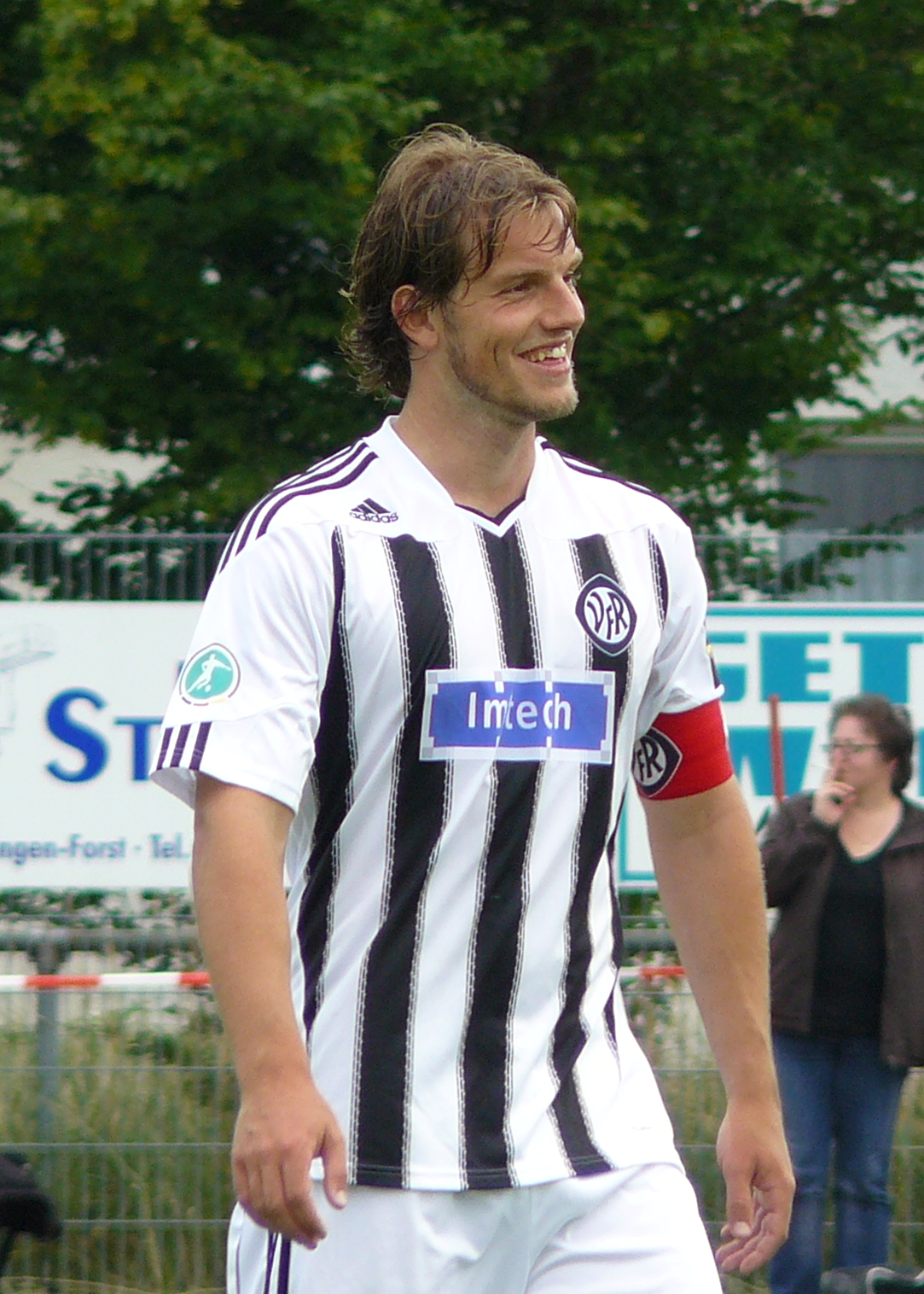
- Benjamin Barg in 2011

Personal information
- Date of birth: 15 September 1984 (age 42)
- Place of birth: Bonn, West Germany
- Height: 1.87 m (6 ft 1 1/2 in)
- Position: Defensive midfielder

Team information
- Current team: FC 08 Villingen
- Number: 17

Youth career
- –1993: SV Oberreichenbach
- 1993–2001: VfL Herrenberg
- 2001–2003: Karlsruher SC

Senior career*
Years	Team	Apps	(Gls)
2003–2004	SV Sandhausen	7	(1)
2004–2005	Bahlinger SC	34	(2)
2005–2008	Karlsruher SC II	72	(5)
2006–2008	Karlsruher SC	1	(0)
2008	SV Sandhausen	11	(0)
2008–2009	Wuppertaler SV Borussia	18	(0)
2009–2013	VfR Aalen	88	(5)
2013–2015	Borussia M'gladbach II	55	(2)
2015–	FC 08 Villingen	21	(3)
- * Club domestic league appearances and goals as of 20 March 2016

Benjamin Barg (born 15 September 1984) is a German footballer who plays for FC 08 Villingen. He is the brother of Thorsten Barg.

He was in the squad of Karlsruher SC in the 2007-08 Bundesliga, but he had no appearance. After this he switched to SV Sandhausen playing in the Regionalliga, at this time the third highest football league in Germany. In the next years, he played regularly for Wuppertaler SV and VfR Aalen in the new formed 3. Liga. Then, he switched gradually to lower class clubs like Borussia M'gladbach II in 2012 and FC 08 Villingen in 2015.
