= Sören Halfar =

German footballer (born 1987)

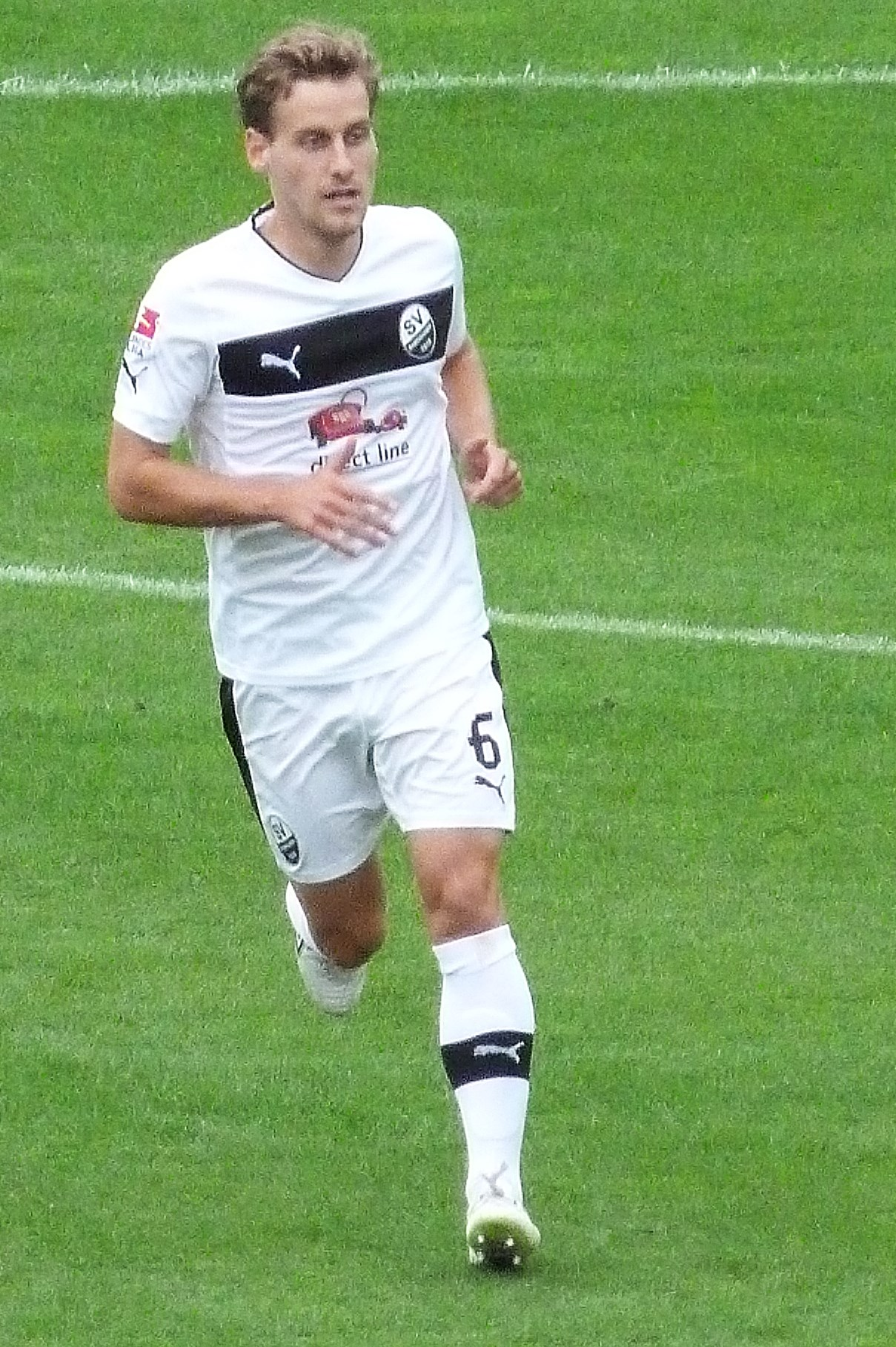
- Halfar with SV Sandhausen in 2012

Personal information
- Date of birth: 2 January 1987 (age 39)
- Place of birth: Hannover, West Germany
- Height: 1.74 m (5 ft 9 in)
- Position: Left-back

Youth career
- –2000: TSV Havelse
- 2000–2001: Marathon Hannover
- 2001–2004: Hannover 96

Senior career*
Years	Team	Apps	(Gls)
2004–2008	Hannover 96	17	(0)
2007	→ SC Paderborn (loan)	18	(0)
2008–2010	SC Paderborn	24	(0)
2010–2011	Wacker Burghausen	33	(4)
2011–2013	SV Sandhausen	26	(0)
Total		118	(4)

International career
2007	Germany U-20	1	(0)
2008	Germany U-21	4	(0)

Managerial career
- 2015: TSV Havelse (caretaker)
- * Club domestic league appearances and goals

Sören Halfar (born 2 January 1987) is a German former professional footballer who played as a left-back.

== Club career ==
Born in Hannover, Halfar joined his hometown club's youth ranks in January 2001, and progressed to the senior squad list for the 2004–05 season. He made his Bundesliga debut on 29 January 2005 in a 1–0 win at Arminia Bielefeld. His time was then twice blighted by torn cruciate ligament injuries, while he managed a handful of first team appearances in each season since his debut.

In January 2007, Halfar joined SC Paderborn 07 on loan from his home club, the Bundesliga side Hannover 96.

He left SC Paderborn in summer 2010 when his contract ran out. On 3 June 2010, he signed a two-year contract for Wacker Burghausen, leaving for SV Sandhausen a year later.

== International career ==
Halfar had four caps for the Germany under-21 national team after progressing from the under-19s.
