= Mitja Schäfer =

German footballer

Personal information
- Date of birth: 27 February 1980 (age 46)
- Place of birth: Cologne, West Germany
- Position: Central defender

Youth career
- –1998: TuS Höhenhaus

Senior career*
Years	Team	Apps	(Gls)
1998–2004	1. FC Köln II	148	(5)
2004–2006	LR Ahlen	22	(1)
2006–2007	Erzgebirge Aue	9	(0)
2007–2008	Rot-Weiss Essen	14	(1)
2008–2010	Wuppertaler SV Borussia	68	(0)
2010–2013	SC Fortuna Köln	69	(5)
- * Club domestic league appearances and goals as of 2 September 2013

Mitja Schäfer (born 27 February 1980) is a German footballer who played in the 2. Bundesliga for LR Ahlen and Erzgebirge Aue.
