= Wellington (footballer, born 1985) =

Brazilian footballer

Personal information
- Full name: Wellington Santos da Silva
- Date of birth: August 17, 1985 (age 41)
- Place of birth: Guarulhos, Brazil
- Height: 1.86 m (6 ft 1 in)
- Position: Left-back

Youth career
- 2003–2005: União São João

Senior career*
Years	Team	Apps	(Gls)
2005	América-SP (loan)		
2005	Ituano (loan)		
2006–2007	Grêmio	23	(0)
2007	Corinthians (loan)	6	(1)
2007–2008	Mainz 05 (loan)	6	(0)
2008–2009	C.D. Nacional	5	(0)
2010	FK Liepājas Metalurgs	6	(0)
- * Club domestic league appearances and goals

Wellington Santos da Silva or simply Wellington (born August 17, 1985) is a Brazilian former professional footballer who played as a left-back.

== Career ==
=== Early career ===
Wellington was born in Guarulhos, Brazil. He began his career in his home country with União São João in São Paulo. Following attention from various São Paulo (state) clubs, he then loaned for América-SP and Ituano.

=== Grêmio and loan ===
At the close of the 2005 season (May 2, 2006) he moved to Grêmio, and there he won Rio Grande do Sul State League in 2006 (including a good participation in the Brazilian League).

In 2007, he signed to Sport Club Corinthians Paulista on loan until 31 December 2007, to play 2007 Campeonato Brasileiro Série A.

On August 31, 2007, he moved to 2. Bundesliga club Mainz 05 on loan. The loan fee was reported as €200,000.

=== Nacional ===
In 2008, he signed for Nacional from Portugal. He then played in the UEFA Europa League.

=== Liepājas Metalurgs ===
On March 30, 2010 he was signed by the Latvian champions FK Liepājas Metalurgs. He signed a contract until June 1, 2010. On 1 May 2010 in a league match against Daugava Daugavpils Wellington suffered a serious knee injury and was taken to hospital right away. The medical tests showed that the injury was too serious to play and Wellington is expected not to play at least for a half year. On May 13 Liepājas Metalurgs announced that Wellington had been released and had already gone back home to Brazil to treat his injury there.

== Honours ==
- Rio Grande do Sul State League: 2006
