= Niels Hansen (German footballer) =

German footballer

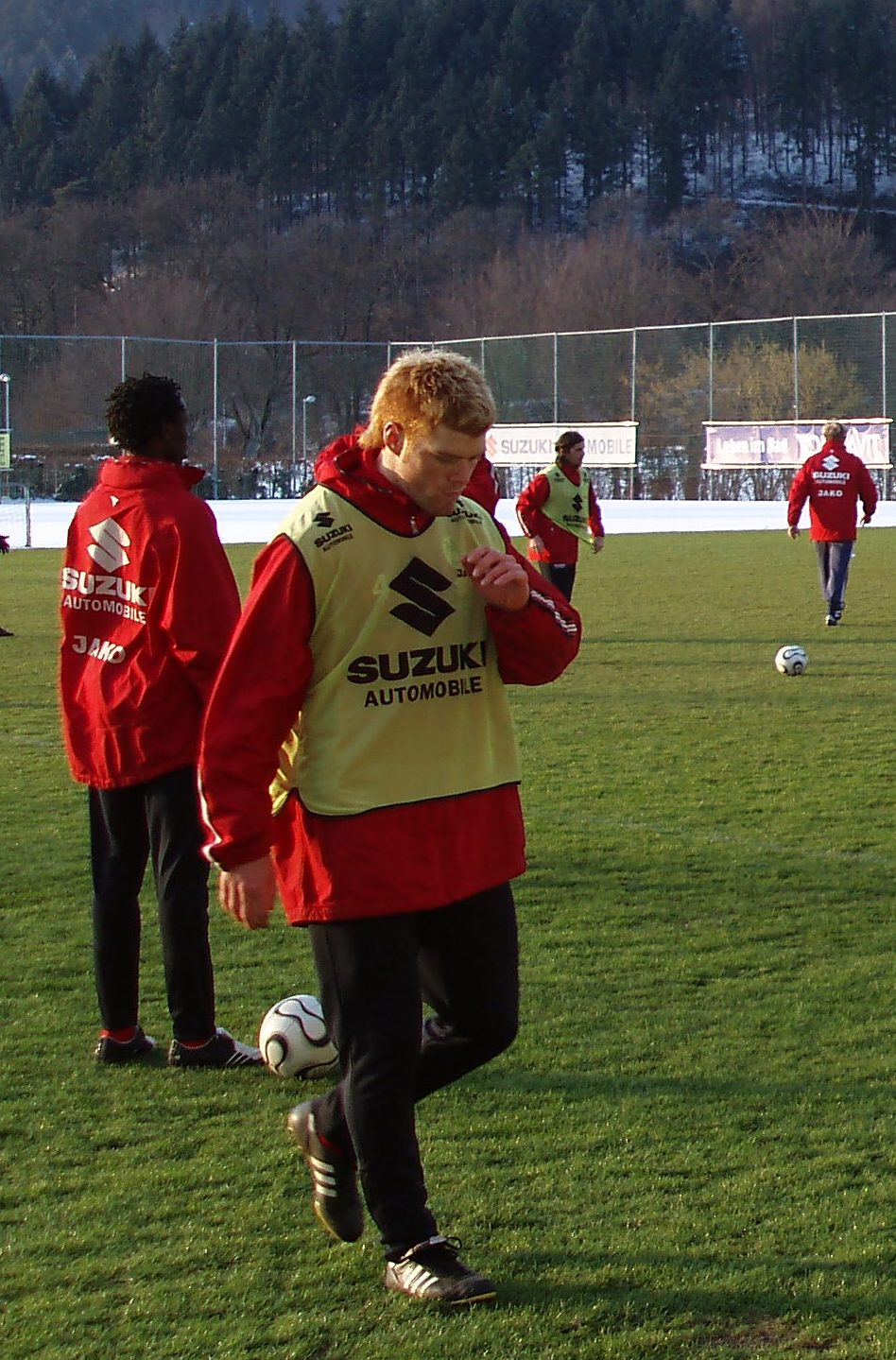
- Hansen in 2006

Personal information
- Date of birth: 25 July 1983 (age 43)
- Place of birth: Flensburg, West Germany
- Height: 1.83 m (6 ft 0 in)
- Position: Midfielder

Youth career
- 1997: TSV Husby
- 1997–1999: TSV Nordmark Satrup
- 1999–2000: Büdelsdorfer TSV

Senior career*
Years	Team	Apps	(Gls)
2000–2005	Holstein Kiel	52	(0)
2005–2007	SC Freiburg	38	(3)
2007–2009	Carl Zeiss Jena	50	(3)
2009–2013	VfL Osnabrück	84	(9)
Total		224	(15)
- * Club domestic league appearances and goals

Niels Hansen (born 25 July 1983) is a German former professional footballer who played as a midfielder.
