= Alexander Meyer (footballer, born 1983) =

German footballer

Personal information
- Date of birth: 19 October 1983 (age 43)
- Place of birth: Jülich, West Germany
- Height: 1.82 m (6 ft 0 in)
- Position: Defender

Youth career
- SV 1919 Rödingen-Höllen
- SC Jülich 1910
- –1999: Germania Teveren
- 1999–2002: Bayer 04 Leverkusen

Senior career*
Years	Team	Apps	(Gls)
2002–2007	Bayer 04 Leverkusen II	58	(3)
2004–2006	→ MSV Duisburg (loan)	39	(0)
2007–2010	MSV Duisburg	0	(0)
Total		97	(3)

International career
2002	Germany Team 2006	1	(0)
2003	Germany U-20		
- * Club domestic league appearances and goals

Alexander Meyer (born 19 October 1983 in Jülich, West Germany) is a former German footballer.
