= Kevin Hansen (footballer) =

German footballer

Personal information
- Date of birth: 13 August 1979 (age 47)
- Place of birth: Hamburg, West Germany
- Height: 1.80 m (5 ft 11 in)
- Position: Midfielder

Youth career
- SC Vorwärts Billstedt

Senior career*
| Years | Team | Apps | (Gls) |
| 1999–2002 | Hansa Rostock II | 93 | (28) |
| 2002–2007 | Hansa Rostock | 27 | (3) |
| 2007 | Erzgebirge Aue | 0 | (0) |
- * Club domestic league appearances and goals

Kevin Hansen (born 13 August 1979) is a German former professional footballer who played as a midfielder.

== Career ==
Hansen was born in Hamburg. He spent four seasons in the Bundesliga with Hansa Rostock. After his contract with Hansa Rostock expired in summer 2007, he joined Erzgebirge Aue in the 2. Bundesliga on a two-year contract.

== Background ==
In April 2010, he was taken into custody by German police for his involvement in cocaine smuggling from Paraguay to Germany.
