= Petrik Sander =

German footballer and manager (born 1960)

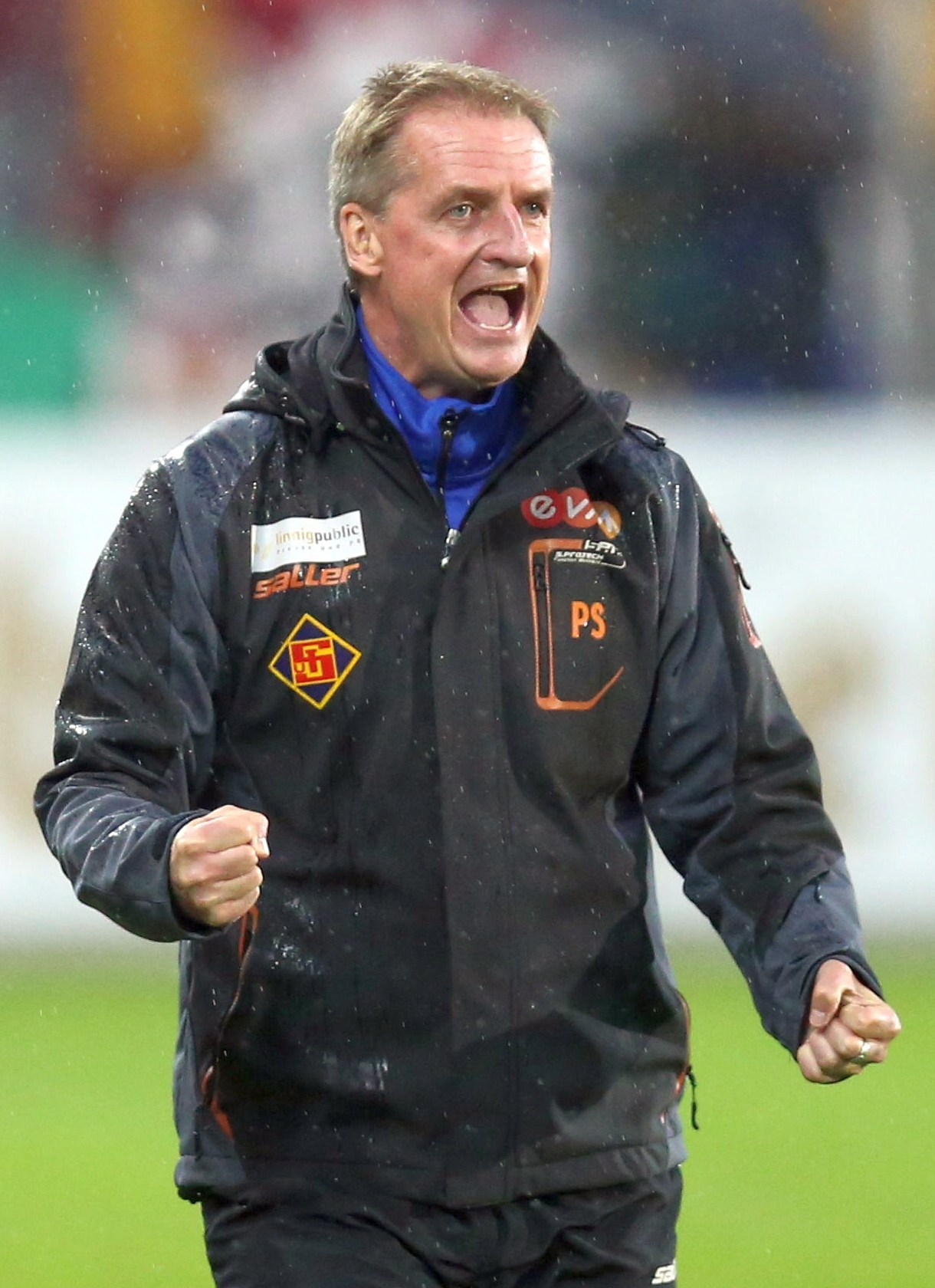
- Sander in 2017

Personal information
- Date of birth: 17 November 1960 (age 65)
- Place of birth: Quedlinburg, East Germany]
- Height: 1.79 m (5 ft 10 in)
- Position: Forward

Team information
- Current team: 1. FC Magdeburg (manager)

Youth career
- 1966–1978: Motor Quedlinburg

Senior career*
Years	Team	Apps	(Gls)
1978–1979	Motor Quedlinburg		
1979–1981	ASG Vorwärts Cottbus Süd		
1981–1984	Energie Cottbus	48	(13)
1984–1986	Motor Quedlinburg		
1986–1987	Motor Nordhausen		
1987–1994	Energie Cottbus	160	(59)

Managerial career
- 2004–2007: Energie Cottbus
- 2008–2009: VfR Aalen
- 2009–2011: TuS Koblenz
- 2011–2013: Carl Zeiss Jena
- 2015–2018: TuS Koblenz
- 2019: FSV Budissa Bautzen
- 2022–2025: 1. FC Magdeburg II
- 2025–: 1. FC Magdeburg
- * Club domestic league appearances and goals

Petrik Sander (born 17 November 1960) is a German football manager and former player. He is the manager of 1. FC Magdeburg.

== Playing career ==
Sander played over 150 games in the DDR-Oberliga for Energie Cottbus and Motor Nordhausen.

== Coaching career ==
In 1997, Sander became assistant manager at Energie Cottbus. He was later made head coach, when Eduard Geyer left the club. In 2006, he led the club to promotion into the Bundesliga. His first season as a Bundesliga coach ended with a 13th place, and the club was secured another year in the league. However, due to bad results in the beginning of the 2007–08 season, Sander was sacked on 23 September 2007.

On 21 November 2008, Sander signed a contract as head coach at VfR Aalen and was fired on 5 May 2009. After seven months without a job, Sander signed as head coach of TuS Koblenz on 27 December 2009. He left Koblenz in 2011 after their relegation from the 3. Liga, becoming manager of Carl Zeiss Jena in November 2011. He was sacked by Jena shortly after the start of the 2013–14 season. On 1 January 2015, he returned to TuS Koblenz. On 28 February 2019, Sander was appointed as manager of FSV Budissa Bautzen.
