= Johannes Dietwald =

German former football player

Personal information
- Date of birth: 13 April 1985 (age 41)
- Place of birth: Hanover, West Germany
- Height: 1.77 m (5 ft 10 in)
- Position: Midfielder

Youth career
- TSV Mühlenfeld
- 1999–2004: Hannover 96

Senior career*
Years	Team	Apps	(Gls)
2004–2007	Hannover 96 II	19	(2)
2005–2007	Hannover 96	1	(0)
2007–2012	TSV Mühlenfeld		
- * Club domestic league appearances and goals

Johannes Dietwald (born 13 April 1985 in Hanover) is a German former football player. He spent two seasons in the Bundesliga with Hannover 96.
