= Víctor Lorenzón =

Argentine-Italian footballer

Víctor Hugo Lorenzón
Personal information
- Birth name: Víctor Hugo Lorenzón
- Date of birth: 22 May 1977 (age 49)
- Place of birth: Buenos Aires, Argentina
- Height: 1.85 m (6 ft 1 in)
- Position: Defender

Youth career
- Platense

Senior career*
Years	Team	Apps	(Gls)
1996–2000	Platense	62	(0)
2001	The Strongest	7	(1)
2001	Deportivo Quito	6	(0)
2002	Provincial Osorno		
2002	Defensores de Belgrano	10	(0)
2003	San Lorenzo (MdP)	0	(0)
2003–2005	Fortuna Düsseldorf	43	(8)
2005–2007	Rot-Weiss Essen	54	(7)
2007	FC Carl Zeiss Jena	2	(0)
2008–2010	Wuppertaler SV Borussia	28	(0)
- * Club domestic league appearances and goals

Víctor Hugo Lorenzón (born 22 May 1977) is an Argentine retired football player. He also holds Italian citizenship.
