= Benjamin Schöckel =

German footballer

Personal information
- Date of birth: August 16, 1980 (age 46)
- Place of birth: Bad Neustadt (Saale), West Germany
- Height: 1.81 m (5 ft 11 in)
- Position: Defender

Youth career
- 1986–1992: DJK Leutershausen
- 1992–1995: SV Sportfreunde Bad Neustadt
- 1995–1996: 1. FC Schweinfurt 05
- 1996–1999: FC Bayern Munich

Senior career*
Years	Team	Apps	(Gls)
1999–2001	Bayern Munich (A)	29	(0)
2001–2003	VfR Aalen	43	(1)
2003–2007	FC Energie Cottbus	46	(0)
2007–2008	SV Wehen Wiesbaden	0	(0)
2008–2009	VfR Aalen	21	(0)
Total		139	(1)
- * Club domestic league appearances and goals

Benjamin Schöckel (born August 16, 1980 in Bad Neustadt an der Saale) is a German former footballer. He spent one season in the Bundesliga with FC Energie Cottbus.
