= Matthias Langkamp =

German footballer

Personal information
- Date of birth: 24 February 1984 (age 42)
- Place of birth: Speyer, West Germany
- Height: 1.91 m (6 ft 3 in)
- Position: Defender

Youth career
- –1989: Sportfreunde Merfeld
- 1989–2001: Preußen Münster
- 2001–2004: Arminia Bielefeld

Senior career*
Years	Team	Apps	(Gls)
2004–2005	Arminia Bielefeld	27	(0)
2005–2006	VfL Wolfsburg	1	(0)
2006–2007	Grasshoppers	12	(1)
2007–2008	Arminia Bielefeld	13	(0)
2008–2009	Panionios	9	(0)
2009–2011	Karlsruher SC	37	(4)
Total		99	(5)

International career
2004	Germany Team 2006	1	(0)
2005	Germany U-21	2	(0)
- * Club domestic league appearances and goals

Matthias Langkamp (born 24 February 1984) is a German former professional footballer who played as a defender.

== Club career ==
Born in Speyer, Langkamp first signed professional terms with Arminia Bielefeld and enjoyed an impressive debut season in the Bundesliga in the 2004–05 season, earning rave reviews and a call-up to the international setup with the Germany U21. Considered a very promising young talent at that time, he courted the attention of a host of bigger clubs and was eventually bought by VfL Wolfsburg. However, there he had a falling out with manager Holger Fach, who relegated Langkamp to the reserve team and only granted him one appearance for the first team before offloading him to Swiss club Grasshoppers.

After a season in Switzerland, Langkamp returned to his former club Arminia Bielefeld and at the beginning of the season he enjoyed a remarkable return to form. However, after a strong challenge during a match against MSV Duisburg, strangely Langkamp appeared to still be concussed even a week after the match. Upon return from his injury, Langkamp suffered a dramatic loss of form and confidence. After his error led to a crucial goal for opponents Energie Cottbus, he had to endure a very public on-pitch dressing down from his teammates. He fell out of favour for the remainder of the season and rarely featured in the first team again.

Langkamp was not offered a new contract by Arminia Bielefeld, who released him at the end of the 2007–08 season. He then secured a contract with Panionios in the Super League Greece and played a number of games for them in the 2008–09 season, becoming a popular figure amongst the local fans.

He returned to Germany after one season, signing with Karlsruher SC on 29 June 2009. In his first season back in Germany however, his attempts to re-establish himself were thwarted by injury. Although he found himself out of the side initially, he later forced his way into the team and looked impressive, showing off his attacking threat by scoring two goals in successive games. However, just as he was gaining momentum, in November he went into the treatment room complaining of a pain in his hamstrings; upon investigation, the physio found that he would need an operation on his Achilles tendon. When he went in for the operation, the surgeon discovered that he would actually need operations on both of his Achilles tendons.

The operations kept Langkamp on the sidelines until late March 2010. He made his comeback against Hansa Rostock, coming on as a late substitute and playing for two minutes. But his next substitute appearance proved to be a disaster – with his first tackle he conceded a penalty and with his second tackle he injured himself, damaging his left shoulder joint and effectively ending his season as he required surgery.

Langkamp fought his way back to fitness in time for the 2010–11 season and was involved in the pre-season build-up. On 19 July 2010, Langkamp's injury jinx struck again and threatened to derail his season when he slipped up attempting a sprint, tearing a muscle in his right thigh.

Langkamp overcame his injury returning to play by mid-August. He ended up becoming one of the first names on the Karlsruher SC team-sheet. Langkamp proceeded to have an injury-free run and rearned rave reviews, showcasing the defensive skills that had once made him one of the most coveted defenders in Germany. His powerful physique and heading ability saw him sometimes deployed up-front as an emergency striker, which proved justified when he volleyed in the equalising goal in a crucial match against relegation rivals VfL Osnabrück. The goal proved decisive in securing the club's status in the 2. Bundesliga and earned Langkamp legendary status amongst the Karlsruher SC fans.

In a shock move which caused uproar amongst some sections of the fanbase, Karlsruher SC decided against renew Langkamp's contract, citing that they could not afford their star defender's wage demands. Whilst trying to maintain fitness, searching for a new club, tragedy struck when Langkamp suffered a broken leg in a freak training accident. The serious injury scuppered his attempts to find a club for new season and complications with the rehabilitation have led to a pro-longed recovery period, but Langkamp is now back to full fitness and looking to return to the game.

== International career ==
Langkamp played two games for the Germany under-21 national team.

== Personal life ==
His brother Sebastian Langkamp is a professional footballer as well.
