= Lawrence Aidoo =

Ghanaian footballer (born 1982)

Personal information
- Date of birth: 14 January 1982 (age 44)
- Place of birth: Accra, Ghana
- Height: 1.82 m (6 ft 0 in)
- Position: Midfielder

Youth career
- King Faisal Babes

Senior career*
Years	Team	Apps	(Gls)
1998–1999	Sekondi Hasaacas FC		
1999–2003	Borussia Mönchengladbach	60	(7)
2004–2005	1. FC Nürnberg	19	(1)
2005–2007	Energie Cottbus	15	(0)
2008	FSV Frankfurt	14	(0)
2008–2009	Kickers Emden	36	(2)
Total		144	(10)

International career
2003–2008	Ghana	4	(0)
- * Club domestic league appearances and goals

Lawrence Aidoo (born 14 January 1982) is a Ghanaian former professional footballer who played as a midfielder.

== Career ==
Aidoo was born in Accra, Ghana. Following stints with Borussia Mönchengladbach, Nürnberg, Energie Cottbus, FSV Frankfurt and Kickers Emden in the top three divisions in Germany, Aidoo ended up playing in the lower leagues.

Aidoo made his debut for the Ghana national team in a friendly against Tunisia on 27 March 2003, and appeared in two African Nations Cup qualifying matches later that year.
