= Timo Rost =

German footballer

Personal information
- Date of birth: 29 August 1978 (age 48)
- Place of birth: Lauf an der Pegnitz, West Germany
- Height: 1.81 m (5 ft 11 in)
- Position: Midfielder

Youth career
- SC Happurg
- 1. FC Amberg
- 1. FC Nürnberg

Senior career*
Years	Team	Apps	(Gls)
1997–1998	1. FC Nürnberg	9	(0)
1998–2000	VfB Stuttgart	16	(1)
2000–2001	Austria Wien	30	(2)
2001–2009	Energie Cottbus	205	(11)
2010–2012	RB Leipzig	46	(5)
2013–2014	FC Amberg	14	(2)
Total		320	(21)

International career
1995	Germany U17	3	(1)
1998–1999	Germany U21	7	(0)

Managerial career
- 2013–2016: FC Amberg
- 2016–2018: Greuther Fürth II
- 2018–2022: SpVgg Bayreuth
- 2022: Erzgebirge Aue
- * Club domestic league appearances and goals

Timo Rost (born 29 August 1978) is a German football manager and former player who last managed Erzgebirge Aue.

== Coaching career ==
Rost took over as manager of SpVgg Bayreuth in 2018. After gaining promotion to the 3. Liga, he moved to Erzgebirge Aue. On 20 September 2022, after nine games without a win, Aue announced Rost had been sacked.
