= Thomas Richter (footballer, born 1980) =

German footballer

Personal information
- Full name: Thomas Richter
- Date of birth: 19 August 1980 (age 46)
- Place of birth: Görlitz, East Germany
- Height: 1.89 m (6 ft 2 in)
- Position: Goalkeeper

Youth career
- 1988–1990: MBB SG Augsburg
- 1990–1995: TSV Schwaben Augsburg
- 1995–2000: FC Augsburg

Senior career*
Years	Team	Apps	(Gls)
2000–2003	Borussia Mönchengladbach II	41	(0)
2003–2005	SV Elversberg	68	(0)
2005–2006	SV Darmstadt 98	30	(0)
2006–2007	Sportfreunde Siegen	34	(0)
2007–2009	SV Wehen Wiesbaden	26	(0)
2009–2010	Mpumalanga Black Aces	5	(0)
2010–2011	FC Homburg	33	(0)
Total		237	(0)

International career
1998	Germany U-18	1	(0)
- * Club domestic league appearances and goals

Thomas Richter (born 19 August 1980 in Görlitz, East Germany) is a German former football goalkeeper.

== Career ==
He made his debut on the professional league level in the 2. Bundesliga for SV Wehen Wiesbaden on 23 September 2007 when he started in a game against FC Carl Zeiss Jena. Richter left the club on 30 June 2009 and signed as a free agent with South African club Mpumalanga Black Aces.

Richter is the second German born goalkeeper who played in South Africa after Lutz Pfannenstiel (1998 for Orlando Pirates).
