= Mohammed El Berkani =

Dutch footballer (born 1982)

Personal information
- Date of birth: 13 December 1982 (age 43)
- Place of birth: Heerlen, Netherlands
- Height: 1.80 m (5 ft 11 in)
- Positions: Forward; midfielder

Youth career
- 1988–1995: SV Eikenderveld (Heerlen)
- 1995–1997: RKSV Bekkerveld (Heerlen)
- 1997–2002: Roda JC

Senior career*
| Years | Team | Apps | (Gls) |
| 2003–2005 | Roda JC | 9 | (1) |
| 2004–2005 | → Fortuna Sittard (loan) | 17 | (1) |
| 2006 | Lierse | 17 | (1) |
| 2006–2007 | Carl Zeiss Jena | 6 | (0) |
| 2007 | Carl Zeiss Jena II | 2 | (1) |
| 2007–2008 | Sportfreunde Siegen | 12 | (0) |
| 2008–2009 | Erzgebirge Aue | 25 | (1) |
| 2009–2011 | Visé | 18 | (3) |
| 2012–2013 | OC Khouribga | | |
- * Club domestic league appearances and goals

Mohammed El Berkani (born 13 December 1982) is a Dutch former professional footballer who played as a forward or midfielder.

== Career ==
El Berkani was born in Heerlen. He played professional football in Holland for Roda JC and Fortuna Sittard and moved abroad to play for Lierse in Belgium. He then crossed borders again to play in Germany for Carl Zeiss Jena, Sportfreunde Siegen and Erzgebirge Aue.

In summer 2009 he joined Belgian third-tier side Visé and in 2012 he signed a contract with OC Khouribga in the Moroccan First Division until 2014.

He returned to Holland to play for amateur side EHC in 2013 and later played for GSV'28 and Eikenderveld. In September 2016 he joined the coaching staff of EHC's U-19 team.

== Personal life ==
El Berkani also holds Moroccan citizenship.
