= Sidney (footballer, born 1979) =

Brazilian footballer

Personal information
- Full name: Sidney Santos de Brito
- Date of birth: 16 October 1979 (age 47)
- Place of birth: Recife, Brazil
- Height: 1.78 m (5 ft 10 in)
- Position: Defender

Youth career
- –1991: Sport
- 1991–1998: Santa Cruz

Senior career*
Years	Team	Apps	(Gls)
1998–2001	Ceará		
2001–2004	VfL Osnabrück	71	(4)
2004–2005	Rot-Weiss Essen	23	(0)
2005–2007	Energie Cottbus	29	(0)
2007–2008	Kickers Offenbach	11	(0)
2009	SpVgg Olpe	10	(2)
2009–2011	Sportfreunde Lotte	31	(0)
Total		174	(6)
- * Club domestic league appearances and goals

Sidney Santos de Brito (born 16 October 1979 in Recife), known as Sidney, is a Brazilian former professional footballer who played as a defender. He spent one season in the Bundesliga with FC Energie Cottbus.
