= Daniel Gunkel =

German footballer (born 1980)

Personal information
- Date of birth: 7 June 1980 (age 46)
- Place of birth: Frankfurt, West Germany
- Height: 1.80 m (5 ft 11 in)
- Position: Midfielder

Youth career
- 1986–1994: SV Bonames
- 1994–1996: Rot-Weiss Frankfurt
- 1996–1997: SpVgg Bad Homburg
- 1997–1998: SG 01 Hoechst

Senior career*
Years	Team	Apps	(Gls)
1998–2001	Eintracht Frankfurt II		
2001–2002	Dresdner SC	17	(2)
2002–2003	Preußen Münster	16	(2)
2003–2004	SV Wehen Wiesbaden	32	(6)
2004–2007	Energie Cottbus	80	(7)
2007–2009	Mainz 05	35	(10)
2010	TuS Koblenz	13	(1)
2010–2011	Panetolikos	15	(1)
2011–2012	Kickers Offenbach	18	(0)
2013–2015	BSV Schwarz-Weiß Rehden	17	(1)
2016–	SC Dortelweil	2	(0)

Managerial career
- 2014: BSV Schwarz-Weiß Rehden (interim)
- * Club domestic league appearances and goals

Daniel Gunkel (born 7 June 1980) is a German former professional footballer who played as a midfielder.

== Career ==
Gunkel was born in Frankfurt. He made his debut on the professional league level in the 2. Bundesliga for Energie Cottbus on 8 August 2004, when he started the game against 1. FC Köln.

After playing for 1. FSV Mainz 05 and then TuS Koblenz in the Bundesliga and 2. Bundesliga, he played for Greek club Panetolikos F.C. for half of the 2010–11 season. He returned to Germany in February 2011, signing with Kickers Offenbach.

== Personal life ==
Gunkel also holds Ivorian citizenship. His father is a diplomat from Ivory Coast and his mother is German.
