= 2008–09 Borussia Mönchengladbach season =

Borussia Mönchengladbach
2008–09 season
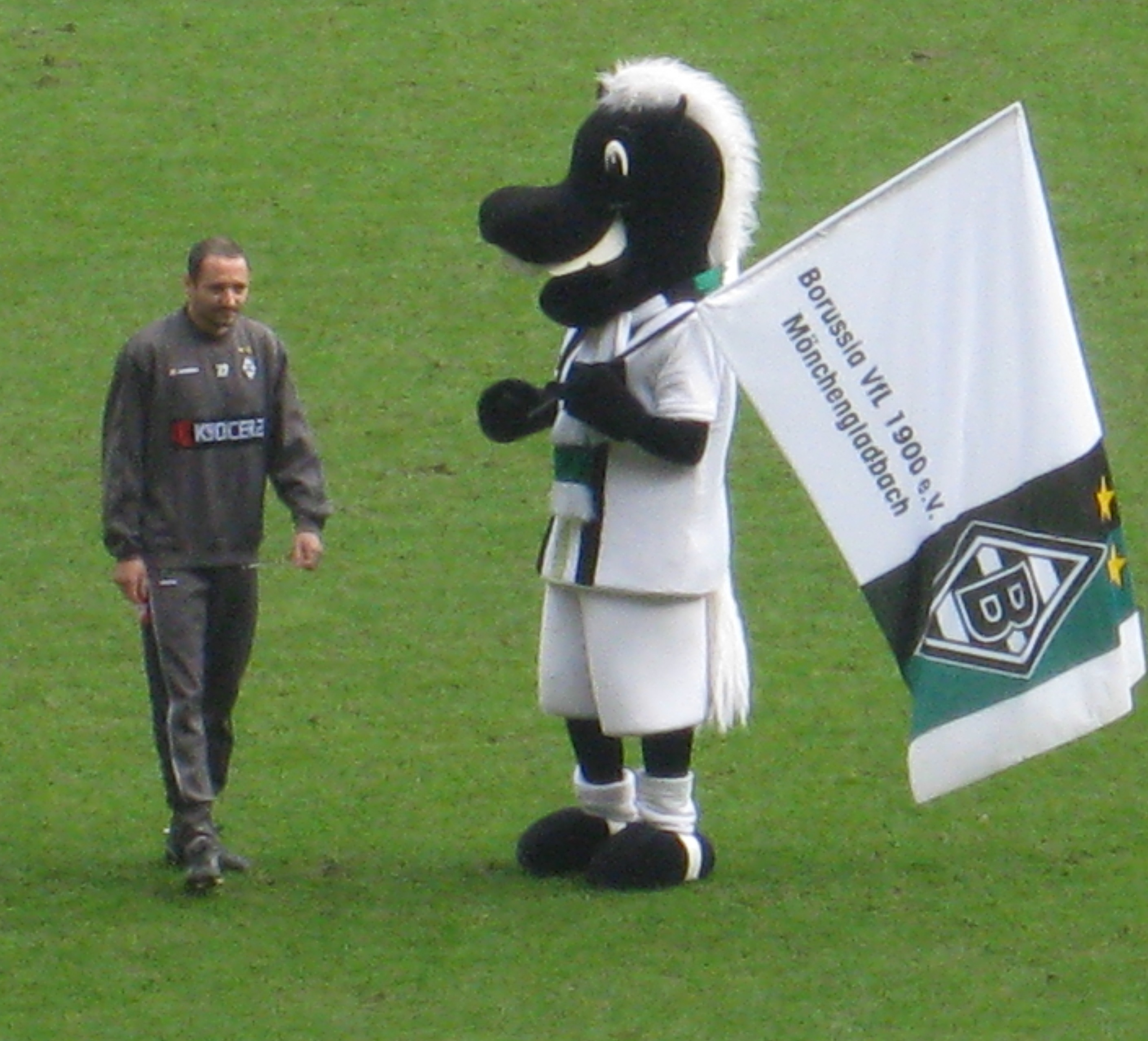
- Oliver Neuville, and mascot Jünter in March 2009
- President: Rolf Königs
- Head coach: Jos Luhukay (until 5 October); Christian Ziege (interim, 5 – 18 October); Hans Meyer (from 18 October)
- Stadium: Borussia-Park
- Bundesliga: 15th
- DFB-Pokal: Second round
- Top goalscorer: League: Rob Friend (7); All: Rob Friend, Marko Marin (7)
- Highest home attendance: 54,067 (sold out; tied between 5 teams) (Note: The 5 clubs who played in a sold-out match against Mönchengladbach were, Werder Bremen, 1. FC Köln, Bayern Munich, Schalke 04, and Borussia Dortmund.)
- Lowest home attendance: 36,166 v Hannover 96
- Average home league attendance: 44,881
- Biggest win: 8–1 v Fichte Bielefeld
- Biggest defeat: 5–0 v Bayer Leverkusen
Home colours	Away colours

The 2008–09 Borussia Mönchengladbach season was the 108th season in the club's history. They played in the Bundesliga, the top tier of German football. It was the club's first season in the top tier since their relegation from the Bundesliga in 2007.

They also took part in the DFB Pokal, Germany's top club knockout competition, where they reached the second round before being eliminated 2–0 by fellow Bundesliga side Energie Cottbus, who they coincidentally played a part in relegating later on in the season.

== Season summary ==
In the summer transfer window German under-21 youngsters Eugen Polanski and Robert Fleßers, along with Danish Tor des Jahres winner Kasper Bøgelund left upon the expiration of their contracts, with Angolan international Nando Rafael transferring to AGS for an undisclosed amount. In replacement, Michael Bradley, Karim Matmour, Gal Alberman and Jean-Sébastien Jaurès signed with die Fohlen.

At the start of the season, Mönchengladbach encountered troubles in the Bundesliga, with several disappointing performances. The worst of it came in a 5–1 defeat to 12th place Hannover 96, saw manager Jos Luhukay dismissed in October with only 1 win in 7 league matches, and elimination from the DFB-Pokal by Energie Cottbus. Christian Ziege's brief one match stint as manager saw Borussia get their 4th point of the season in a 2–2 draw to Bochum away, with Hans Meyer taking the reins for the rest of the season.

In the winter transfer window, Meyer signed Belgian goalkeeper Logan Bailly from Genk, Czech national Tomáš Galásek from Baník Ostrava, and Canadian defender Paul Stalteri from Tottenham Hotspur, with Meyer selling fellow Germans Alexander Voigt to Greuther Fürth, and Sascha Rösler to 1860 Munich. In a tough final day battle, Mönchengladbach played Dortmund in the Borussia derby, while Bielefeld faced Hannover. Cottbus took on Leverkusen, and won 3–1, and as Bielefeld finished with a 1–1 draw, they went down to 20th, cementing their place next season in the 2. Bundesliga. Mönchengladbach were able to salvage a 1–1 draw in the derby, which secured Bundesliga status. Meyer escaped the drop with die Fohlen while being bottom of the league from mid December to early March. Meyer left the club at the season's close, and recently sacked Arminia Bielefeld coach Michael Frontzeck took his place.

== Squad ==
Squad at end of season

Note: Flags indicate national team as defined under FIFA eligibility rules; some limited exceptions apply. Players may hold more than one non-FIFA nationality.

No.	Pos.	Nation	Player
1	GK	GER	Christofer Heimeroth
2	DF	GER	Sebastian Schachten
3	DF	BEL	Filip Daems (captain)
4	DF	NED	Roel Brouwers
5	DF	CIV	Steve Gohouri
6	DF	GER	Jan-Ingwer Callsen-Bracker
7	MF	MLI	Soumaïla Coulibaly
8	MF	CZE	Tomáš Galásek
9	FW	ISR	Roberto Colautti (Note: Colautti was born in Córdoba, Argentina, but he soon obtained Israeli citizenship through his Israeli wife, allowing him the option of playing for Israel. He made his international debut for Israel in September 2006.)
11	MF	GER	Marko Marin (Note: Marin was born in Bosanska Gradiška, SFR Yugoslavia, but he soon obtained German citizenship, allowing him the option of playing for Germany. He played for Germany at the U-16, U-17, U-18, and U-21 levels, making his senior international debut in May 2008.)
13	DF	CAN	Paul Stalteri
14	FW	SWE	Sharbel Touma (Note: Touma was born in Beirut, Lebanon, but he soon obtained Swedish citizenship, allowing him the option of playing for Sweden. He played for Sweden at the U-16, U-18, and U-21 levels, making his senior level international debut in February 2001.)
15	DF	GER	Thomas Kleine
16	FW	CAN	Rob Friend
17	DF	NED	Patrick Paauwe
18	GK	GER	Frederic Löhe

No.	Pos.	Nation	Player
19	MF	ISR	Gal Alberman
20	DF	FRA	Jean-Sébastien Jaurès
22	DF	GER	Tobias Levels
25	FW	GER	Moses Lamidi (Note: Lamidi was born in Lagos, Nigeria, but he soon obtained German citizenship, allowing him the option to play for Germany. He represented Germany at U-20 level 5 times.)
26	MF	USA	Michael Bradley
27	FW	GER	Oliver Neuville (Note: Neuville was born in Locarno, Switzerland, but he had the option of playing for Germany through his German father. He represented Germany at senior level, making his international debut in September 1998.)
28	MF	GER	Johannes van den Bergh
29	MF	GER	Alexander Baumjohann
30	GK	BEL	Logan Bailly
31	DF	BRA	Dante
32	DF	GER	Christian Dorda
33	DF	GER	Tim Heubach
37	MF	GER	Tony Jantschke
40	FW	ALG	Karim Matmour (Note: Matmour was born in Strasbourg, France, but he had the option of playing for Algeria through his Algerian parents. He represented Algeria at senior level, making his international debut in February 2007.)
41	DF	GER	Oliver Stang

== Transfers ==
=== In ===
No.	Pos.	Player	Transferred from	Fee	Date	Source
40	MF	(Algeria) Karim Matmour	(Germany) SC Freiburg	Undisclosed	4 June 2008	
6	DF	(Germany) Jan-Ingwer Callsen-Bracker	(Germany) Bayer Leverkusen	Undisclosed	1 July 2008	
19	MF	(Israel) Gal Alberman	(Israel) Beitar Jerusalem	Undisclosed	1 July 2008	
20	DF	(France) Jean-Sébastien Jaurès	(France) Auxerre	Free	1 July 2008	
26	FW	(United States) Michael Bradley	(Netherlands) Heerenveen	€5,000,000	31 August 2008	
30	GK	(Belgium) Logan Bailly	(Belgium) Genk	Undisclosed	22 December 2008	
8	MF	(Czech Republic) Tomáš Galásek	(Czech Republic) Baník Ostrava	Undisclosed	22 December 2008	
13	DF	(Canada) Paul Stalteri	(England) Tottenham Hotspur	Free	22 December 2008	
31	DF	(Brazil) Dante	(Belgium) Standard Liège	Undisclosed	27 December 2008	

=== Out ===
No.	Pos.	Player	Transferred to	Fee	Date	Source
26	MF	(Germany) Robert Fleßers	(Germany) Mainz 05	Free	4 June 2008	
9	FW	(Angola) Nando Rafael	(Norway) AGS	Undisclosed	1 July 2008	
13	DF	(Portugal) Zé António	(Spain) Racing Santander	Free	1 July 2008	
20	DF	(Denmark) Kasper Bögelund	(Denmark) Aalborg	Free	1 July 2008	
6	MF	(Poland) Eugen Polanski	(Spain) Getafe	Free	4 July 2008	
17	MF	(Switzerland) David Degen	(Switzerland) Young Boys	Free	22 August 2008	
8	MF	(Denmark) Sebastian Svärd	(Germany) Hansa Rostock	Loan	1 January 2009	
10	FW	(Germany) Sascha Rösler	(Germany) 1860 Munich	Undisclosed	8 January 2009	
13	DF	(Germany) Alexander Voigt	(Germany) Greuther Fürth	Free	13 January 2009	
23	MF	(Cameroon) Marcel Ndjeng	(Germany) Hamburger SV	Loan	26 January 2009	
21	GK	(Germany) Uwe Gospodarek	Released		22 April 2009	

== Competitions ==
=== Overall record ===
Competition	First match	Last match	Starting round	Final position	Record							
Competition	First match	Last match	Starting round	Final position	Pld	W	D	L	GF	GA	GD	Win %
Bundesliga	17 August 2008	23 May 2008	Matchday 1	15th	34	8	7	19	39	62	−23	23.53
DFB-Pokal	9 August 2008	23 September 2008	First round	Second round	2	1	0	1	8	3	+5	50.00
Total					36	9	7	20	47	65	−18	25.00

Last updated: 25 May 2023
Source: kicker

=== Bundesliga ===
==== League table ====
Pos	Team	Pld	W	D	L	GF	GA	GD	Pts	Qualification or relegation
13	Eintracht Frankfurt	34	8	9	17	39	60	−21	33	
14	VfL Bochum	34	7	11	16	39	55	−16	32	
15	Borussia Mönchengladbach	34	8	7	19	39	62	−23	31	
16	Energie Cottbus (R)	34	8	6	20	30	57	−27	30	Qualification to relegation play-offs
17	Karlsruher SC (R)	34	8	5	21	30	54	−24	29	Relegation to 2. Bundesliga

Source: kicker (in German)
Rules for classification: 1) points; 2) goal difference; 3) number of goals scored.
(R) Relegated

==== Results summary ====
Overall								Home						Away					
Pld	W	D	L	GF	GA	GD	Pts	W	D	L	GF	GA	GD	W	D	L	GF	GA	GD
34	8	7	19	39	62	−23	31	5	4	8	23	27	−4	3	3	11	16	35	−19

Source: kicker

==== Results by round ====
Round	1	2	3	4	5	6	7	8	9	10	11	12	13	14	15	16	17	18	19	20	21	22	23	24	25	26	27	28	29	30	31	32	33	34
Ground	H	A	H	A	H	A	H	A	H	A	H	A	H	A	H	H	A	A	H	A	H	A	H	A	H	A	H	A	H	A	H	A	A	H
Result	L	L	W	L	L	L	L	D	W	L	L	W	D	L	L	L	L	L	D	D	W	L	W	W	L	D	L	L	D	L	W	W	L	D
Position	15	18	11	16	17	18	18	18	17	17	17	14	14	15	17	18	18	18	18	18	18	18	17	16	16	16	16	16	17	17	15	14	15	15

Source: DFB
A = Away; H = Home; W = Win; D = Draw; L = Loss

==== Matches ====
17 August 2008 1	Borussia Mönchengladbach	1–3	VfB Stuttgart	Mönchengladbach
17:00 CEST	Rösler (yellow card) 20'; Alberman (yellow card) 54'; Friend 60'; Matmour (yellow card) 85'	Report	Hitzlsperger 15'; Marica 26'; Boka (yellow card) 31'; Gómez 44'; Šimák (yellow card) 66'	Stadium: Borussia-Park; Attendance: 47,028; Referee: Herbert Fandel

23 August 2008 2	1899 Hoffenheim	1–0	Borussia Mönchengladbach	Mannheim
15:30 CEST	Ibišević 31'; Nilsson (yellow card) 52'	Report	Jaurès (yellow card) 22'; Daems (yellow card) 51'; Matmour (yellow card) 71'; Neuville (yellow card) 89'	Stadium: Carl-Benz-Stadion; Attendance: 26,300; Referee: Thorsten Kinhöfer

30 August 2008 3	Borussia Mönchengladbach	3–2	Werder Bremen	Mönchengladbach
15:30 CEST	Matmour 12' (yellow card) 90+2'; Friend 30'; Daems (yellow card) 60'; Baumjohann 71'	Report	Naldo (yellow card) 30'; Jensen (yellow card) 44'; Pizarro 79'; Diego 89'	Stadium: Borussia-Park; Attendance: 54,067; Referee: Manuel Gräfe

14 September 2008 4	Hannover 96	5–1	Borussia Mönchengladbach	Hannover
17:00 CEST	Huszti (penalty missed) 28' 32', 47' (yellow card) 73'; Balitsch (yellow card) 29'; Schlaudraff 43', 67'; Vinícius (yellow card) 58'; Forssell 86' (pen.)	Report	Friend (yellow card) 9' (goal) 54'; Coulibaly (yellow card) 55'; Rösler (yellow card) 75'; Daems (yellow card) 85'	Stadium: AWD-Arena; Attendance: 41,362; Referee: Markus Schmidt

20 September 2008 5	Borussia Mönchengladbach	0–1	Hertha Berlin	Mönchengladbach
15:30 CEST		Report	Kačar 11' (yellow card) 33'; Chahed (yellow card) 89'	Stadium: Borussia-Park; Attendance: 43,193; Referee: Felix Brych

27 September 2008 6	Hamburger SV	1–0	Borussia Mönchengladbach	Hamburg
15:30 CEST	Petrić 19'; Mathijsen (yellow card) 80'	Report	Daems (yellow card) 40'; Paauwe (yellow card) 76'	Stadium: HSH-Nordbank-Arena; Attendance: 57,000; Referee: Michael Weiner

4 October 2008 7	Borussia Mönchengladbach	1–2	1. FC Köln	Mönchengladbach
15:30 CEST	Brouwers 10' (yellow card) 22'; Alberman (yellow card) 87'; Gohouri (yellow card) 90+2'	Report	Ehret 5'; Brečko (yellow card) 35'; Novaković 88'	Stadium: Borussia-Park; Attendance: 54,067; Referee: Günter Perl

17 October 2008 8	VfL Bochum	2–2	Borussia Mönchengladbach	Bochum
20:30 CEST	Schröder (yellow card) 26'; Mavraj (yellow card) 30'; Freier (yellow card) 41'; Dabrowski 55' (yellow card) 59'; Kaloğlu 77'	Report	Voigt (yellow card) 26'; Gohouri 30'; Friend (yellow card) 65'; Kleine 79'; Marin (yellow card) 90'	Stadium: Rewirpower-Stadion; Attendance: 31,328; Referee: Helmut Fleischer

25 October 2008 9	Borussia Mönchengladbach	1–0	Karlsruher SC	Mönchengladbach
15:30 CEST	Friend (yellow card) 32'; Paauwe 51'; Neuville (yellow card) 89'	Report		Stadium: Borussia-Park; Attendance: 42,051; Referee: Deniz Aytekin

28 October 2008 10	VfL Wolfsburg	3–0	Borussia Mönchengladbach	Wolfsburg
20:00 CET	Grafite 40' (pen.); Madlung 55'; Misimović 75' (pen.); Schäfer (yellow card) 79'	Report	Svärd (yellow card) 47'; Paauwe (yellow card) 55'; Friend (yellow card) 59'; Voigt (yellow card) 61'; Brouwers (yellow card) 71'	Stadium: Volkswagen Arena; Attendance: 22,580; Referee: Michael Kempter (referee)

2 November 2008 11	Borussia Mönchengladbach	1–2	Eintracht Frankfurt	Mönchengladbach
17:00 CET	Russ 12' (o.g.)	Report	Fenin 16'; Fink 52'	Stadium: Borussia-Park; Attendance: 44,773; Referee: Florian Meyer

8 November 2008 12	Arminia Bielefeld	0–2	Borussia Mönchengladbach	Bielefeld
15:30 CET	Schuler (yellow card) 37'; Herzig (yellow card) 45'	Report	Marin 6', 80' (yellow card) 24'; Gospodarek (yellow card) 88'	Stadium: Schüco-Arena; Attendance: 24,600; Referee: Peter Gagelmann

15 November 2008 13	Borussia Mönchengladbach	2–2	Bayern Munich	Mönchengladbach
15:30 CET	Gohouri (yellow card) 31'; Friend 79'; Bradley 81'	Report	Toni 21'; Lell (yellow card) 40'; Schweinsteiger (yellow card) 54'; Ribery 65' (pen.); Sosa (yellow card) 90'	Stadium: Borussia-Park; Attendance: 54,067; Referee: Michael Weiner

22 November 2008 14	Schalke 04	3–1	Borussia Mönchengladbach	Gelsenkirchen
15:30 CET	Altıntop 17', 45'; Farfán 24' (pen.); Jones (yellow card) 63'	Report	van den Bergh (yellow card) 3'; Levels (yellow card) 24'; Friend 30'; Dorda (yellow card) 68'	Stadium: Veltins-Arena; Attendance: 61,673; Referee: Jochen Drees

29 November 2008 15	Borussia Mönchengladbach	1–3	Energie Cottbus	Mönchengladbach
15:30 CET	Baumjohann (yellow card) 27'; Gohouri (yellow card) 33' (goal) 59'; Marin (yellow card) 69'	Report	Bradley 17' (o.g.); Ziebig (yellow card) 34'; Sørensen 51'; Radeljić (yellow card) 55'; Tremmel (yellow card) 69'; Jula 85' (yellow card) 85'; Kurth (yellow card) 89'	Stadium: Borussia-Park; Attendance: 36,454; Referee: Peter Sippel

6 December 2008 16	Borussia Mönchengladbach	1–3	Bayer Leverkusen	Mönchengladbach
15:30 CET	Paauwe (yellow card) 18'; Daems (yellow card) 49'; Baumjohann (yellow card) 58'; Jantschke 61'	Report	Kießling 25', 37'; Helmes 54'; Kadlec (yellow card) 83'	Stadium: Borussia-Park; Attendance: 44,161; Referee: Wolfgang Stark

12 December 2008 17	Borussia Dortmund	2–1	Borussia Mönchengladbach	Dortmund
20:30 CET	Hajnal (yellow card) 33' (yellow-red card) 38'; Zidan 35'; Kringe (yellow card) 45+1'; Błaszczykowski (yellow card) 45+3'; Şahin 56'	Report	Marin (yellow card) 18'; Bradley (yellow card) 52'; van den Bergh 80'	Stadium: Signal-Iduna-Park; Attendance: 79,700; Referee: Knut Kircher

31 January 2009 18	VfB Stuttgart	2–0	Borussia Mönchengladbach	Stuttgart
15:30 CET	Šimák (yellow card) 57'; Marica 67'; Khedira (yellow card) 81'; Gómez 86'	Report		Stadium: Mercedes-Benz Arena; Attendance: 41,300; Referee: Wolfgang Stark

7 February 2009 19	Borussia Mönchengladbach	1–1	1899 Hoffenheim	Mönchengladbach
15:30 CET	Baumjohann 44'; Friend (yellow card) 74'; Bradley (yellow card) 79'	Report	Compper (yellow card) 4'; Ibertsberger (yellow card) 14'; Obasi (yellow card) 70'; Jaissle (yellow card) 80'; Wellington 89'	Stadium: Borussia-Park; Attendance: 42,421; Referee: Lutz Wagner

14 February 2009 20	Werder Bremen	1–1	Borussia Mönchengladbach	Bremen
15:30 CET	Tziolis (yellow card) 69'; Pizarro 77'; Naldo (yellow card) 86'	Report	Bradley (yellow card) 57' (goal) 79'	Stadium: Weser-Stadion; Attendance: 41,332; Referee: Markus Schmidt

21 February 2009 21	Borussia Mönchengladbach	3–2	Hannover 96	Mönchengladbach
15:30 CET	Dorda (yellow card) 23'; Baumjohann 36'; Marin 43'; Neuville 83'; Galásek (yellow card) 84'	Report	Balitsch (yellow card) 10'; Tarnat (yellow card) 47'; Pinto 53' (yellow card) 70'; Schulz 77'	Stadium: Borussia-Park; Attendance: 36,166; Referee: Günter Perl

28 February 2009 22	Hertha Berlin	2–1	Borussia Mönchengladbach	Berlin
15:30 CET	Voronin 28'; Dárdai 44'	Report	Baumjohann (yellow card) 30'; Levels (yellow card) 61'; Bradley 69' (pen.); Gohouri (yellow card) 70'; Lamidi (yellow card) 73'	Stadium: Olympiastadion; Attendance: 48,534; Referee: Peter Gagelmann

7 March 2009 23	Borussia Mönchengladbach	4–1	Hamburger SV	Mönchengladbach
15:30 CET	Daems (yellow card) 20'; Friend 24' (yellow card) 62'; Levels 42'; Brouwers 53'; Marin 65'	Report	Petrić 29'; Tavares (yellow card) 50'; Mathijsen (yellow card) 53'; Jarolim (yellow card) 61'; Rost (yellow card) 63'; Benjamin (yellow card) 78'	Stadium: Borussia-Park; Attendance: 50,273; Referee: Michael Kempter

14 March 2009 24	1. FC Köln	2–4	Borussia Mönchengladbach	Köln
15:30 CET	Brečko 64', 82'; Pezzoni (yellow card) 86'; Petit (yellow card) 86'	Report	Bradley; Levels (yellow card) 41'; Matmour 44'; Galásek (yellow card) 61'; Friend 67'	Stadium: Rhein-Energie-Stadion; Attendance: 50,000; Referee: Thorsten Kinhöfer

20 March 2009 25	Borussia Mönchengladbach	0–1	VfL Bochum	Mönchengladbach
20:30 CET	Stalteri (yellow card) 41'; Marin (yellow card) 51'; Bradley (yellow card) 76'	Report	Dabrowski (yellow card) 20'; Grote 29'; Fernandes (yellow card) 60'; Fuchs (yellow card) 84'	Stadium: Borussia-Park; Attendance: 49,282; Referee: Manuel Gräfe

5 April 2009 26	Karlsruher SC	0–0	Borussia Mönchengladbach	Karlsruhe
17:30 CEST	Stindl (yellow card) 90+1'	Report		Stadium: Wildparkstadion; Attendance: 29,380; Referee: Wolfgang Stark

11 April 2009 27	Borussia Mönchengladbach	1–2	VfL Wolfsburg	Mönchengladbach
15:30 CEST	Dante 79'	Report	Pekarík (yellow card) 4'; Džeko 21'; Šimůnek (yellow card) 44'; Dejagah (yellow card) 78'; Josué (yellow card) 82'; Riether 85'	Stadium: Borussia-Park; Attendance: 49,152; Referee: Knut Kircher

18 April 2009 28	Eintracht Frankfurt	4–1	Borussia Mönchengladbach	Frankfurt
15:30 CEST	Meier 40'; Liberopoulos 47'; Chris (yellow card) 68'; Russ (yellow card) 74' (goal) 80'; Fink 88'	Report	Baumjohann (yellow card) 39'; Bradley (penalty missed) 65'; Daems 75'	Stadium: Commerzbank-Arena; Attendance: 51,500; Referee: Felix Brych

26 April 2009 29	Borussia Mönchengladbach	1–1	Arminia Bielefeld	Mönchengladbach
17:00 CEST	Matmour 12'; Stalteri (yellow card) 54'; Baumjohann (yellow card) 90+2'	Report	Tesche 32'; Kauf (yellow card) 45'; Lamey (yellow card) 65'; Marx (yellow card) 71'; Halfar (yellow card) 87'	Stadium: Borussia-Park; Attendance: 50,108; Referee: Manuel Gräfe

2 May 2009 30	Bayern Munich	2–1	Borussia Mönchengladbach	Munich
15:30 CEST	Schweinsteiger 33'; Altıntop 42'	Report	Brouwers (yellow card) 30'; Daems 38'; Stalteri (yellow card) 85'; Matmour (yellow card) 90'	Stadium: Allianz Arena; Attendance: 69,000; Referee: Babak Rafati

10 May 2009 31	Borussia Mönchengladbach	1–0	Schalke 04	Mönchengladbach
17:00 CEST	Marin (penalty missed) 23' (yellow card) 79'; van den Bergh (yellow card) 32'; Colautti 90'	Report	Rafinha (yellow card) 74'; Kurányi (yellow card) 83'	Stadium: Borussia-Park; Attendance: 54,067; Referee: Peter Sippel

13 May 2009 32	Energie Cottbus	0–1	Borussia Mönchengladbach	Cottbus
20:00 CEST	Angelov (yellow card) 43'; Rost (yellow card) 45'; Vasiljević (yellow card) 82'; Kukielka (yellow card) 86'	Report	Levels (yellow card) 57'; Dante 90+1'	Stadium: Stadion der Freundschaft; Attendance: 20,850; Referee: Peter Sippel

16 May 2009 33	Bayer Leverkusen	5–0	Borussia Mönchengladbach	Düsseldorf
20:00 CEST	Kießling 31'; Helmes 44'; Castro 68'; Kadlec 79'; Dante 86' (o.g.)	Report	Galásek (yellow card) 18'; Schachten (yellow card) 55'	Stadium: LTU-Arena; Attendance: 43,000; Referee: Günter Perl

23 May 2009 34	Borussia Mönchengladbach	1–1	Borussia Dortmund	Mönchengladbach
15:30 CEST	Galásek (yellow card) 49'; Dante 57'	Report	Błaszczykowski 64'	Stadium: Borussia-Park; Attendance: 54,067; Referee: Felix Brych

=== DFB-Pokal ===
In the first round, Borussia Mönchengladbach were drawn against VfB Vichte Bielefeld.

9 August 2008 First round	VfB Fichte Bielefeld	1–8	Borussia Mönchengladbach	Bielefeld
15:30 CEST	Önen 66'	Report	Marin 7', 11', 17' (pen.); Colautti 9', 24'; Rösler 18', 54'; Brouwers 36'	Stadium: Schüco-Arena; Attendance: 8,100; Referee: Babak Rafati

23 September 2008 Second round	Energie Cottbus	3–0	Borussia Mönchengladbach	Cottbus
19:00 CEST	Rangelov 42' (pen.); Skela 73' (pen.), 89' (pen.)	Report		Stadium: Stadion der Freundschaft; Attendance: 9,805; Referee: Michael Kempter (referee)

== Statistics ==
=== Appearances and goals ===
No.	Pos	Nat	Player	Total		Bundesliga		DFB-Pokal	
No.	Pos	Nat	Player	Apps	Goals	Apps	Goals	Apps	Goals
Goalkeepers
1	GK	(Germany) GER	Christofer Heimeroth	11	0	9	0	2	0
18	GK	(Germany) GER	Frederic Löhe	1	0	1	0	0	0
30	GK	(Belgium) BEL	Logan Bailly	17	0	17	0	0	0
Defenders
2	DF	(Germany) GER	Sebastian Schachten	1	0	0+1	0	0	0
3	DF	(Belgium) BEL	Filip Daems	35	2	33	2	2	0
4	DF	(Belgium) BEL	Roel Brouwers	26	3	20+5	2	1	1
5	DF	(Ivory Coast) CIV	Steve Gohouri	15	2	14+1	2	0	0
6	DF	(Germany) GER	Jan-Ingwer Callsen-Bracker	9	0	6+1	0	1+1	0
13	DF	(Canada) CAN	Paul Stalteri	16	0	16	0	0	0
15	DF	(Germany) GER	Thomas Kleine	8	1	3+5	1	0	0
17	DF	(Netherlands) NED	Patrick Paauwe	24	1	21+3	1	0	0
20	DF	(France) FRA	Jean-Sébastien Jaurès	5	0	4	0	1	0
22	DF	(Germany) GER	Tobias Levels	18	1	15+2	1	1	0
31	DF	(Brazil) BRA	Dante	10	3	9+1	3	0	0
32	DF	(Germany) GER	Christian Dorda	7	0	6+1	0	0	0
33	DF	(Germany) GER	Tim Heubach	0	0	0	0	0	0
41	DF	(Germany) GER	Oliver Stang	0	0	0	0	0	0
Midfielders
7	MF	(Mali) MLI	Soumaïla Coulibaly	5	0	0+4	0	0+1	0
8	MF	(Czech Republic) CZE	Tomáš Galásek	15	0	15	0	0	0
11	MF	(Germany) GER	Marko Marin	35	7	25+8	4	2	3
19	MF	(Israel) ISR	Gal Alberman	17	0	14+2	0	1	0
26	MF	(United States) USA	Michael Bradley	28	5	26+2	5	0	0
28	MF	(Germany) GER	Johannes van den Bergh	8	1	4+3	1	0+1	0
29	MF	(Germany) GER	Alexander Baumjohann	30	3	22+6	3	2	0
37	MF	(Germany) GER	Tony Jantschke	4	1	3+1	1	0	0
Forwards
9	FW	(Israel) ISR	Roberto Colautti	25	3	10+14	1	1	2
14	FW	(Sweden) SWE	Sharbel Touma	2	0	0+1	0	0+1	0
16	FW	(Canada) CAN	Rob Friend	25	7	23+1	7	0+1	0
25	FW	(Germany) GER	Moses Lamidi	4	0	0+4	0	0	0
27	FW	(Germany) GER	Oliver Neuville	26	1	3+22	1	1	0
40	FW	(Algeria) ALG	Karim Matmour	35	3	29+5	3	1	0
Players transferred out during season
8	MF	(Denmark) DEN	Sebastian Svärd	7	0	6	0	1	0
10	FW	(Germany) GER	Sascha Rösler	6	2	2+2	0	2	2
13	DF	(Germany) GER	Alexander Voigt	7	0	6	0	1	0
23	MF	(Cameroon) CMR	Marcel Ndjeng (Note: Ndjeng was born in Bonn, Germany, but he had the option of playing for Cameroon through his Cameroonian father. He made his international debut for Cameroon in May 2008.)	11	0	6+3	0	2	0
21	GK	(Germany) GER	Uwe Gospodarek	7	0	7	0	0	0

Source: worldfootball
worldfootball

=== Goalscorers ===
Rank (Note: If two or more players have the same number of goals, they are ranked by appearances, and if the same happens for appearances, they are ranked by minutes played.)	Pos.	No.	Nat.	Player	Bundesliga	DFB-Pokal	Total
1	FW	16	(Canada)	Rob Friend	7	0	7
1	MF	11	(Germany)	Marko Marin	4	3	7
3	MF	26	(United States)	Michael Bradley	5	0	5
4	DF	31	(Brazil)	Dante	3	0	3
4	FW	9	(Israel)	Roberto Colautti	1	2	3
4	DF	4	(Netherlands)	Roel Brouwers	2	1	3
4	MF	29	(Germany)	Alexander Baumjohann	3	0	3
4	FW	40	(Algeria)	Karim Matmour	3	0	3
9	FW	11	(Germany)	Sascha Rösler	0	2	2
9	DF	5	(Ivory Coast)	Steve Gohouri	2	0	2
9	DF	3	(Belgium)	Filip Daems	2	0	2
12	MF	37	(Germany)	Tony Jantschke	1	0	1
12	DF	15	(Germany)	Thomas Kleine	1	0	1
12	MF	28	(Germany)	Johannes van den Bergh	1	0	1
12	DF	18	(Germany)	Tobias Levels	1	0	1
12	DF	17	(Netherlands)	Patrick Paauwe	1	0	1
12	FW	27	(Germany)	Oliver Neuville	1	0	1
—				Own goal	1	0	1
Total					39	8	47
