= 2009–10 Borussia Mönchengladbach season =

Borussia Mönchengladbach
2009–10 season
- Manager: Michael Frontzeck
- Stadium: Borussia-Park
- Bundesliga: 12th
- DFB-Pokal: Second round
Home colours	Away colours

The 2009–10 Borussia Mönchengladbach season lists the results of the German association football team Borussia Mönchengladbach (Gladbach) in the Borussia Mönchengladbach season.

== First-team squad ==
Squad at end of season

Note: Flags indicate national team as defined under FIFA eligibility rules; some limited exceptions apply. Players may hold more than one non-FIFA nationality.

No.	Pos.	Nation	Player
1	GK	GER	Christofer Heimeroth
3	DF	BEL	Filip Daems (captain)
4	DF	NED	Roel Brouwers
6	DF	GER	Jan-Ingwer Callsen-Bracker
7	DF	CAN	Paul Stalteri
8	MF	NED	Marcel Meeuwis
9	FW	ISR	Roberto Colautti
10	FW	ARG	Raúl Bobadilla
11	FW	GER	Marco Reus
13	DF	GER	Roman Neustädter
14	MF	GER	Thorben Marx
15	DF	GER	Thomas Kleine
16	FW	CAN	Rob Friend
18	MF	VEN	Juan Arango
19	MF	ISR	Gal Alberman

No.	Pos.	Nation	Player
20	DF	FRA	Jean-Sébastien Jaurès
21	GK	GER	Frederic Löhe
22	DF	GER	Tobias Levels
23	DF	GER	Christian Dorda
24	DF	GER	Tony Jantschke
25	FW	GER	Moses Lamidi
26	MF	USA	Michael Bradley
27	FW	GER	Oliver Neuville
28	DF	GER	Tim Heubach
29	FW	GER	Fabian Bäcker
30	GK	BEL	Logan Bailly
31	DF	BRA	Dante
40	MF	ALG	Karim Matmour
41	GK	GER	Marc-André ter Stegen
42	MF	GER	Patrick Herrmann

== Competitions ==
=== Bundesliga ===
==== League table ====
Pos	Team	Pld	W	D	L	GF	GA	GD	Pts
10	Eintracht Frankfurt	34	12	10	12	47	54	−7	46
11	1899 Hoffenheim	34	11	9	14	44	42	+2	42
12	Borussia Mönchengladbach	34	10	9	15	43	60	−17	39
13	1. FC Köln	34	9	11	14	33	42	−9	38
14	SC Freiburg	34	9	8	17	35	59	−24	35

Source: kicker.de (in German)
Rules for classification: 1) points; 2) goal difference; 3) number of goals scored.

==== Matches ====
9 August 2009 1	VfL Bochum	3 – 3	Borussia Mönchengladbach	Bochum
15:30	Azaouagh 51', 52'; Šesták 63'		Arango 19'; Colautti 26'; Brouwers 41'	Stadium: rewirpowerSTADION; Attendance: 29,766; Referee: Michael Kempter (Sauldorf)

3 October 2009 8	Borussia Mönchengladbach	0–1	Borussia Dortmund	Mönchengladbach
18:30 CEST (UTC+2)	Levels (yellow card) 88'	Report	Barrios 38'; Hajnal (yellow card) 69'	Stadium: Borussia-Park; Referee: Manuel Gräfe; Assistant referees: Christian Dingert, Markus Hacker; Fourth official: Thomas Metzen

31 October 2009 11	Hamburger SV	2–3	Borussia Mönchengladbach	Hamburg
15:30 CET (UTC+1)	Trochowski 13', (yellow card) 42'; Zé Roberto 47'; Aogo (yellow card) 55'	Report	Reus 39'; Marx (yellow card) 44'; Dante 76'; Arango (yellow card) 81'; Friend 82'	Stadium: HSH Nordbank Arena; Referee: Deniz Aytekin; Assistant referees: Christian Leicher, Thorsten Schiffner; Fourth official: Thorsten Schriever

21 November 2009 13	Eintracht Frankfurt	1–2	Borussia Mönchengladbach	Commerzbank-Arena, Frankfurt
15:30 CET	Schwegler 86' (pen.)	Report	Nikolov 55' (o.g.); Brouwers 66'	Attendance: 50,000

16 January 2010 18	Borussia Mönchengladbach	1 – 2	VfL Bochum	Mönchengladbach
15:30	Bäcker 80'		Šesták 12'; Dedić 36'	Stadium: Borussia-Park; Attendance: 36,245; Referee: Babak Rafati (Hannover)

6 March 2010 25	Borussia Dortmund	3–0	Borussia Mönchengladbach	Dortmund
18:30 CET (UTC+1)	Großkreutz 13'; Zidan 54', 70'	Report	Bradley (yellow card) 50'; Dante (yellow card) 67'; Bobadilla (yellow card) 89'	Stadium: Signal Iduna Park; Referee: Michael Weiner; Assistant referees: Thomas Frank, Norbert Grudzinski; Fourth official: Harm Osmers

28 March 2010 28	Borussia Mönchengladbach	1–0	Hamburger SV	Mönchengladbach
17:30 CEST (UTC+2)	Brouwers 43'; Marx (yellow card) 71'	Report	Demel (yellow card) 57'; Guerrero (yellow card) 71'; Jarolím (yellow card) 86'	Stadium: Borussia-Park; Referee: Helmut Fleischer; Assistant referees: Sönke Glindemann, Guido Kleve; Fourth official: Christian Bandurski

9 April 2010 30	Borussia Mönchengladbach	2–0	Eintracht Frankfurt	Borussia-Park, Mönchengladbach
20:30 CET	Reus 6'; Dante 10'	Report		Attendance: 48,553
