= Damen (surname) =

Damen or Daemen is a Dutch patronymic surname meaning "son of Daam". Daam is an archaic nickname for Adam. Variant forms are Daamen, Daams, Daems, and Dame. Notable people with these surnames include:

== Damen ==
- Abby Damen (born 1992), New Zealand actress
- Alessandro Damen (born 1990), Dutch football goalkeeper
- Arnold Damen (1815–1890), Dutch Jesuit missionary in Chicago, founder of eight schools
- Gijs Damen (born 1979), Dutch freestyle swimmer
- Grad Damen (born 1997), Dutch football midfielder
- Hubert Damen (born 1946), Belgian theater and television actor
- Jan Damen (1898–1957), Dutch violinist
- José Damen (born 1959), Dutch butterfly swimmer
- Karen Damen (born 1974), Flemish singer, actress, and television host
- Kommer Damen (born 1944), Dutch shipbuilder and CEO of the Damen Group
- Onorato Damen (1893–1979), Italian communist revolutionary
- Piet Damen (born 1934), Dutch racing cyclist

== Daams ==
- Hans Daams (born 1962), Dutch racing cyclist
- Jessie Daams (born 1990), Belgian racing cyclist, daughter of Hans

== Daemen ==
- Jan Daemen Cool (1589–1660), Dutch portrait painter (here "Daemen" is still a patronym)
- Joan Daemen (born 1965), Belgian cryptographer
- Maria Catharina Daemen or Mother Magdalena Daemen (1787–1858), Dutch Franciscan sister who founded a religious congregation
- Tom Daemen (born 1985), Dutch football midfielder

== See also ==
- Daemen University, named for Maria Catharina Daemen
- Daems, surname of the same origin
- Dahmen (surname), German surname
- Damen (disambiguation)
