= Daems =

Daems is a Dutch patronymic surname. Daem or Daam is short for either Adam, Damianus, or Damasus. The surname is most common in the Belgian province of Antwerp. Daems may refer to:

- Anja Daems (born 1968), Belgian television and radio presenter
- Eduard Daems (1826–1879), Belgian missionary in Wisconsin
  - Thiry Daems, Wisconsin, named after him
- Emile Daems (1938–2024), Belgian road racing cyclist
- Filip Daems (born 1978), Belgian footballer
- Greet Daems (born 1980), Belgian politician
- Rik Daems (born 1959), Belgian painter, wine trader and politician
- Willem Frans Daems (1911–1994), Dutch pharmacist, anthroposophist, pianist, teacher and editor
