= Damen =

Damen is German for "Ladies". More specifically, it may refer to:

== Surname ==
- Damen (surname), a Dutch surname

== Given name ==
- Damen Auguste, a character from "The Immortals" novels
- Damen Shaw (born 1974), Australian rules footballer
- Damen Wheeler (born 1973), American football player

== Chicago Transit Authority stations ==
Four stations on Damen Avenue (named after Father Arnold Damen)

- Damen station (CTA Brown Line)
- Damen station (CTA Blue Line)
- Damen station (CTA Pink Line)
- Damen station (CTA Green Line)

== Other uses ==
- Damen Group, a Dutch shipbuilding company
- Damen (town) (大门镇), in Dongtou County, Zhejiang, China
- Damen Island (大门岛), largest island of Dongtou County, Zhejiang, China
- Damen Rural District, in Sistan and Baluchestan Province, Iran
- Das Damen, American alternative rock band

== See also ==
- Dahmen, a municipality in Germany
- Dahmen (surname), a German surname
