= Sisters of St. Francis =

Sisters of St. Francis may refer to:

- Sisters of St. Francis of Assisi, a Roman Catholic religious congregation for women founded in 1849 in St. Francis, Wisconsin, U.S.
- Sisters of St. Francis Health Services, Inc., now named Franciscan Alliance, Inc., a healthcare system in Indiana and Illinois, U.S.
- Sisters of St. Francis of the Holy Cross, a diocesan community of religious women founded in 1868 in northeastern Wisconsin, U.S.
- Sisters of St. Francis of the Martyr St. George, a Roman Catholic Congregation of consecrated women founded in 1869 in Thuine, Germany
- Sisters of St. Francis of Perpetual Adoration, a papal congregation of the Roman Catholic Church, founded in 1863 in Olpe, Germany
- Sisters of Saint Francis of Rochester, Minnesota, a Roman Catholic religious congregation for women founded in 1877 in the Diocese of Winona
- Sisters of St. Francis, any of a number of other religious congregations that are part of the Third Order of Saint Francis, a third order within the Franciscan movement of the Catholic Church
  - School Sisters of St. Francis, an international religious congregation of Catholic Sisters founded in 1874 in New Cassel, Wisconsin, U.S.
  - Sisters of St. Francis of Maryville, a former Roman Catholic religious congregation for women based in Maryville, Missouri, U.S., founded in 1894 and ended in 1985
  - Sisters of St. Francis of Penance and Christian Charity, a Roman Catholic religious congregation for women founded in 1835 in Heythuysen, the Netherlands
  - Sisters of St. Joseph of the Third Order of St. Francis, a Roman Catholic Franciscan religious congregation for women established in 1901 in Stevens Point, Wisconsin, U.S.
  - Tertiary Sisters of St. Francis – Cameroon, the African Province of a congregation of Roman Catholic Religious Sisters founded in 1700 in Brixen, Italy
- Bernardine Sisters of St. Francis, a Roman Catholic apostolic congregation of pontifical right founded in 1894, based in Reading, Pennsylvania, U.S.
- Oblate Sisters of St. Francis de Sales, a congregation of Roman Catholic Religious Sisters established in 1866 in Troyes, France
- Poor Sisters of St. Francis, a religious congregation founded in 1845 in Germany

== See also ==
- Franciscan Sisters (disambiguation)
