= Sebastian Svärd =

Danish footballer (born 1983)

Personal information
- Full name: Sebastian Steve Cann-Svärd
- Date of birth: 15 January 1983 (age 43)
- Place of birth: Hvidovre, Denmark
- Height: 1.85 m (6 ft 1 in)
- Position: Defensive midfielder

Youth career
- –1998: B 1908
- 1998–1999: KB
- 1999–2003: Arsenal

Senior career*
Years	Team	Apps	(Gls)
2000–2005	Arsenal	0	(0)
2003	→ Copenhagen (loan)	9	(0)
2004	→ Stoke City (loan)	13	(1)
2004–2005	→ Brøndby (loan)	22	(0)
2005–2006	Vitória Guimarães	28	(1)
2006–2010	Borussia Mönchengladbach	26	(0)
2006–2010	Borussia Mönchengladbach II	5	(0)
2009	→ Hansa Rostock (loan)	13	(0)
2010–2011	Roda JC	12	(0)
2012	Silkeborg	3	(0)
2013	Syrianska	10	(0)
2013	Wycombe Wanderers	0	(0)
2014–2015	Songkhla United	27	(0)
2016	Þróttur	8	(0)
Total		176	(2)

International career
1998–1999	Denmark U16	5	(0)
1999–2000	Denmark U17	23	(0)
2000–2001	Denmark U19	13	(0)
2003–2004	Denmark U20	7	(0)
2002–2004	Denmark U21	9	(0)
- * Club domestic league appearances and goals

Sebastian Steve Cann-Svärd (born 15 January 1983), commonly known as Sebastian Svärd, is a Danish former professional footballer who played as a defensive midfielder.

== Club career ==
Svärd was born in Hvidovre, Denmark, to a Swedish mother and Ghanaian father, and grew up in Urbanplanen, a neighbourhood consisting of subsidised housing in Vestamager. He started out at local Amager-based club B.1908, before moving to KB, the reserve team of Copenhagen. Here he was seen as a prodigy, impressing the coaches of the Denmark under-16, under-17 and under-19 national teams. As so he was bought by English club Arsenal for an undisclosed fee in November 2000.

He won the FA Youth Cup with the club's academy in his first season. His first-team Arsenal debut came in a League Cup fourth round match on 27 November 2001, as a substitute in a 2–0 win over Grimsby Town. Over the next two years, he made two more appearances for Arsenal, one more in the League Cup against Sunderland and one in the FA Cup against Oxford United. Arsenal went on to win the FA Cup final that season but Svärd was left out of the squad.

He returned on loan to his old club Copenhagen in August 2003, in need of first-team play; after just four months he returned to England to play for Stoke City, for whom he played nine league matches and scored one goal against Sunderland. In August 2004, he came on as a substitute in Arsenal's 3–1 Community Shield victory over Manchester United.

As such soon afterwards he was loaned to Danish club Brøndby for the whole season. At Brøndby, he played both as a defensive midfielder and right back, in a season which ended with both the Danish Superliga championship and triumph in the Danish Cup tournament. Altogether Svärd was capped a sum of four times for the Gunners.

In July 2005, he left Arsenal to join Portuguese club Vitória Guimarães for an undisclosed fee.

After a single season with Vitória, where he was, and still is a beloved player, he moved to Borussia Mönchengladbach on 21 June 2006, again for an undisclosed fee. On 25 February 2007, he played his first Bundesliga match for Mönchengladbach against Werder Bremen. He was snapped on loan upon 8 January 2009 by Hansa Rostock.

On 15 January 2010, he moved on from Borussia to become a free agent. Svärd was then signed only three days later by Dutch club Roda JC. Svärd then returned to Denmark and played three matches for Silkeborg in 2011–12. He was released by the club in June 2012, upon expiration of his contract.

In August 2012, he had two trials which did not result in a contract for him: with German club SC Paderborn 07 and with Hapoel Ramat Gan in Israel.

He joined Swedish side Syrianska for the 2013 Allsvenskan.

On 24 October 2013, he joined Wycombe Wanderers on a one-month contract.

In January 2014, Svärd signed with Thai club Songkhla United.

On 11 January 2016, he returned to Europe to sign with Icelandic top division club Þróttur. At the end of the season, Svärd left the club.

== International career ==
Svärd debuted for the Denmark under-21 national team in November 2002. He played more than 50 matches for various Danish youth national teams.

== Career statistics ==
Appearances and goals by club, season and competition
Club	Season	League			National cup		League cup		Other		Total	
Club	Season	Division	Apps	Goals	Apps	Goals	Apps	Goals	Apps	Goals	Apps	Goals
Arsenal	2001–02	Premier League	0	0	0	0	1	0	0	0	1	0
Arsenal	2002–03	Premier League	0	0	1	0	1	0	0	0	2	0
Arsenal	2004–05	Premier League	0	0	0	0	0	0	1	0	1	0
Arsenal	Total		0	0	1	0	2	0	1	0	4	0
Copenhagen (loan)	2003–04	Danish Superliga	9	0	0	0	0	0	1	0	10	0
Stoke City (loan)	2003–04	First Division	13	1	1	0	0	0	0	0	14	1
Brøndby (loan)	2004–05	Danish Superliga	22	0	0	0	0	0	0	0	22	0
Vitória Guimarães	2005–06	Primeira Liga	28	1	1	0	0	0	6	0	35	1
Borussia Mönchengladbach	2006–07	Bundesliga	9	0	0	0	0	0	0	0	9	0
Borussia Mönchengladbach	2007–08	2. Bundesliga	11	0	2	0	0	0	0	0	13	0
Borussia Mönchengladbach	2008–09	Bundesliga	6	0	1	0	0	0	0	0	7	0
Borussia Mönchengladbach	Total		26	0	3	0	0	0	0	0	29	0
Borussia Mönchengladbach II	2006–07	Regionalliga Nord	4	0	–		–		–		4	0
Borussia Mönchengladbach II	2007–08	Oberliga Nordrhein	1	0	–		–		–		1	0
Borussia Mönchengladbach II	Total		5	0	0	0	0	0	0	0	5	0
Hansa Rostock (loan)	2008–09	2. Bundesliga	13	0	1	0	0	0	0	0	14	0
Roda JC	2009–10	Eredivisie	6	0	0	0	0	0	0	0	6	0
Roda JC	2010–11	Eredivisie	6	0	0	0	0	0	0	0	6	0
Roda JC	Total		12	0	0	0	0	0	0	0	12	0
Silkeborg IF	2011–12	Danish Superliga	3	0	0	0	0	0	0	0	3	0
Hapoel Ramat Gan	2012–13	Israeli Premier League	0	0	1	0	0	0	0	0	1	0
Syrianska	2013	Allsvenskan	10	0	1	1	0	0	0	0	11	1
Songkhla United	2014	Thai League 1	27	0	0	0	0	0	0	0	27	0
Þróttur	2016	Úrvalsdeild karla	8	0	1	1	0	0	0	0	9	1
Career total			176	2	10	2	2	0	8	0	196	4

== Honours ==
Arsenal

- FA Youth Cup: 2001
- Community Shield: 2004

Brøndby

- Danish Superliga: 2005
- Danish Cup: 2005

Borussia Mönchengladbach

- 2. Bundesliga: 2008
