= Franciscan Sisters =

Franciscan Sisters may refer to:

- Franciscan Sisters of Christian Charity
- Franciscan Sisters of the Eucharist
- Franciscan Sisters of Mary
- Franciscan Sisters of Perpetual Adoration
- Franciscan Sisters of the Sacred Heart
- Society of the Atonement, a Catholic, formerly Episcopal, Franciscan religious society
- Third Order of Saint Francis
  - Missionary Sisters of the Immaculate Conception of the Mother of God

== See also ==
- Sisters of St. Francis (disambiguation)
