= Paul Stalteri =

Canadian soccer player (born 1977)

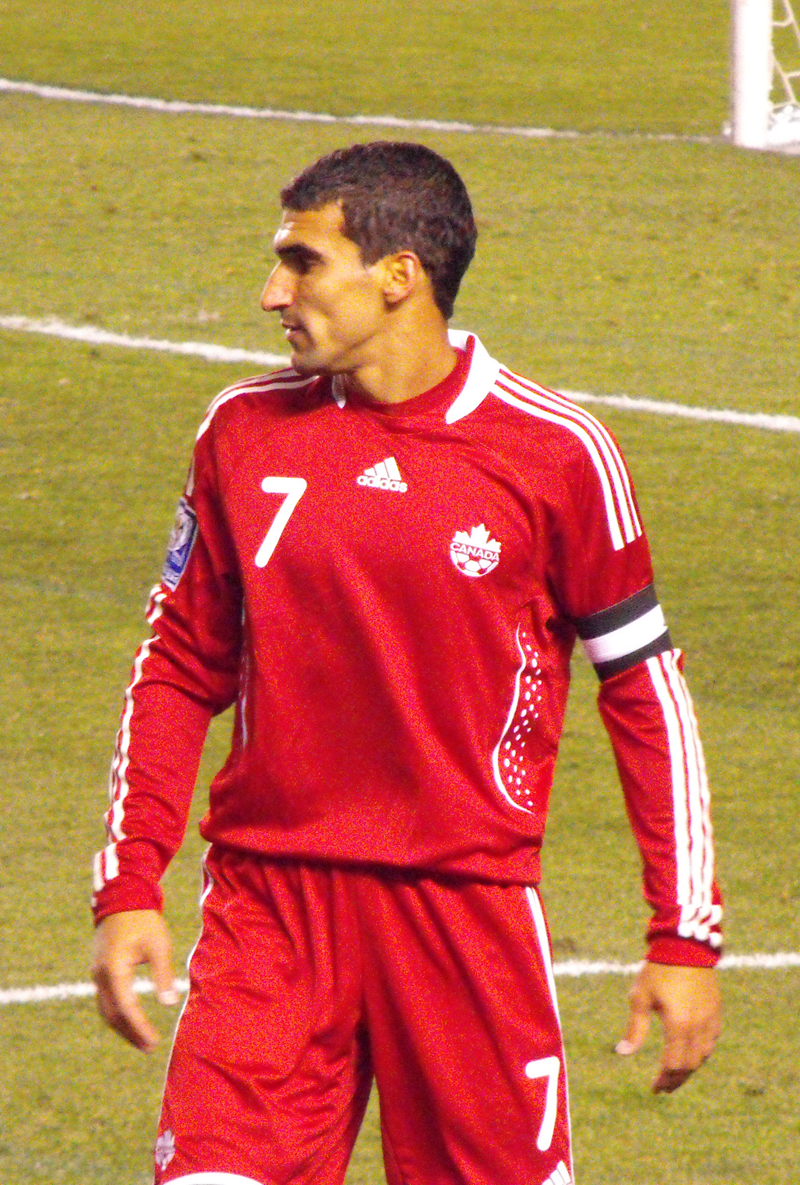
- Stalteri captaining Canada in 2008

Personal information
- Full name: Paul Andrew Stalteri
- Date of birth: October 18, 1977 (age 49)
- Place of birth: Etobicoke, Ontario, Canada
- Height: 5 ft 11 in (1.80 m)
- Positions: Wing-back; midfielder

Team information
- Current team: Canada (assistant)

Youth career
- 1992–1995: Malton Bullets

College career
Years	Team	Apps	(Gls)
1995–1996	Clemson Tigers		

Senior career*
Years	Team	Apps	(Gls)
1997	Toronto Lynx	16	(7)
1998–2005	Werder Bremen	151	(6)
2005–2008	Tottenham Hotspur	42	(3)
2008	→ Fulham (loan)	13	(0)
2009–2011	Borussia Mönchengladbach	19	(0)
Total		241	(16)

International career
1993	Canada U17	3	(0)
1996–1997	Canada U20	9	(0)
1998–2000	Canada U23	7	(2)
1997–2010	Canada	84	(7)

Managerial career
- 2020–2021: York United (assistant)
- 2022–2023: Toronto FC (assistant)
- 2023–: Canada (assistant)
Medal record
Representing Canada
Men's soccer
CONCACAF Gold Cup
Winner	2000 United States
Third place	2002 United States
- * Club domestic league appearances and goals

Paul Andrew Stalteri (born October 18, 1977) is a Canadian former professional soccer player who played as a defender or midfielder. He spent most of his professional career in Germany, winning the league and cup double with Werder Bremen in the 2003–04 season. Stalteri also played football in the Premier League for Tottenham Hotspur and Fulham.

A regular for the Canada national team, Stalteri made a total of 84 appearances at the senior level, scoring 7 goals. He was the all-time cap leader of the Canada national team until Julian de Guzman surpassed him in November 2015. He was part of the squad that won the CONCACAF Gold Cup in 2000.

He serves as an assistant coach for the Canada national team.

== Early life ==
Stalteri was born to an Italian father and a Guyanese mother. While growing up, Stalteri says his favourite player was Paolo Maldini and the first live football match he ever saw was Toronto Blizzard. He also considered Physical Education to be his favourite subject.

While playing youth soccer in Ontario with the Malton Bullets, won a Robbie International Soccer Tournament Championship.

== Club career ==
A defender who can play either side of the field as well as in midfield, Stalteri began his soccer career playing one year of college soccer at Clemson University in 1996. Following his first year, he elected to turn professional, signing a contract with the Toronto Lynx while attending York University. After playing one season with the Lynx, alongside fellow Canada national team teammate Dwayne De Rosario, where he led the team in scoring with eight goals and two assists, Stalteri was noticed by a scout from Werder Bremen and purchased from the team. After two and a half seasons in the reserves, Stalteri made his debut with the club in August 2000, scoring in the first game of the season against Energie Cottbus.

During the 2001–02 season, Stalteri established his role in the first team at Bremen and went on to cement his role as a regular in the 2002–03 season. In 2003–04, Werder Bremen won the Bundesliga.

In May 2005, Stalteri transferred to English Premiership club Tottenham Hotspur. He featured heavily in the 2005–06 campaign as Spurs narrowly missed out on a Champions League place, but the arrival of full back Pascal Chimbonda at White Hart Lane the following season limited his chances.

On March 4, 2007, after coming on as a substitute, he scored a dramatic last minute winner against London rivals West Ham United to complete an extraordinary 4–3 win. He had hardly featured in the first team all season up to that point. His other Spurs goals came against Manchester City in the league and Leicester City in the FA Cup.

On January 31, 2008, Stalteri moved to Fulham on loan until the end of the season. He made his debut for Fulham away at Middlesbrough on February 9, 2008 where his team lost 1–0. Having returned to White Hart Lane, his contract was terminated by mutual consent on December 21, 2008.

Stalteri returned to the Bundesliga, having been immediately signed by Borussia Mönchengladbach where he joined fellow international Rob Friend.

He announced his retirement as a player at the age of 35 on March 20, 2013.

== International career ==
Stalteri was a regular starter for the Canada national team for over ten years from making his debut on August 17, 1997 against Iran. In total, he won 84 caps and scored seven goals for the national team. That made him the most capped Canadian of all time until this record was surpassed by Julian De Guzman in 2015. He was named team captain for a friendly on June 1, 2007 against Venezuela, and remained captain for international fixtures for the rest of his international career including for the entirety of the 2007 CONCACAF Gold Cup. On September 7, 2010 Stalteri earned his 83rd cap for Canada in a 2–1 win over Honduras making him the all-time leader in appearances for the Canada men's national team.

In May 2017, Stalteri was inducted into the Canadian Soccer Hall of Fame.

== Coaching career ==
In February 2020, Stalteri joined Canadian Premier League club York9 FC (later renamed York United & Inter Toronto) as an assistant coach. He departed the club after the 2021 season.

In January 2022, he joined Major League Soccer club Toronto FC as an assistant coach.

In October 2023, he joined the Canada national team as an assistant coach.

== Career statistics ==
=== Club ===
Appearances and goals by club, season and competition
Club	Season	League			National cup (Note: Includes DFB-Pokal, FA Cup)		League cup (Note: Includes Football League Cup)		Continental		Other		Total	
Club	Season	Division	Apps	Goals	Apps	Goals	Apps	Goals	Apps	Goals	Apps	Goals	Apps	Goals
Toronto Lynx	1997	USL A-League	16	8	–		–		–		–		16	8
Werder Bremen II	1997–98	Regionalliga Nord	14	3	–		–		–		–		14	3
Werder Bremen II	1998–99	Regionalliga Nord	29	7	1	0	–		–		–		30	7
Werder Bremen II	1999–2000	Regionalliga Nord	28	4	2	0	–		–		–		30	4
Werder Bremen II	Total		71	14	3	0	0	0	0	0	0	0	74	14
Werder Bremen	2000–01	Bundesliga	31	1	2	0	–		5 (Note: Appearances in UEFA Cup)	2	–		38	3
Werder Bremen	2001–02	Bundesliga	22	3	2	0	–		1	0	–		25	3
Werder Bremen	2002–03	Bundesliga	33	0	5	0	–		4	0	1 (Note: Appearances in DFL-Ligapokal)	0	43	0
Werder Bremen	2003–04	Bundesliga	33	2	6	1	–		4	0	0	0	43	3
Werder Bremen	2004–05	Bundesliga	32	0	5	0	–		8 (Note: Appearances in UEFA Champions League)	0	2	0	47	0
Werder Bremen	Total		151	6	20	1	0	0	22	2	3	0	196	9
Tottenham Hotspur	2005–06	Premier League	33	1	1	1	1	0	–		–		35	2
Tottenham Hotspur	2006–07	Premier League	6	1	3	0	2	0	3	0	–		14	1
Tottenham Hotspur	2007–08	Premier League	3	0	1	0	0	0	3	0	–		7	0
Tottenham Hotspur	Total		42	2	5	1	3	0	6	0	0	0	56	3
Fulham (loan)	2007–08	Premier League	13	0	0	0	0	0	–		–		13	0
Borussia Mönchengladbach	2008–09	Bundesliga	16	0	0	0	–		–		–		16	0
Borussia Mönchengladbach	2009–10	Bundesliga	3	0	0	0	–		–		–		3	0
Borussia Mönchengladbach	Total		19	0	0	0	0	0	0	0	0	0	19	0
Career total			312	30	28	2	3	0	28	2	3	0	374	34

=== International ===
Scores and results list Canada's goal tally first, score column indicates score after each Stalteri goal.

List of international goals scored by Paul Stalteri
No.	Date	Venue	Opponent	Score	Result	Competition
1	June 2, 1999	Edmonton, Canada	Guatemala	1–0	2–0	1999 Canada Cup
2	November 14, 2001	Paola, Malta	Malta	1–1	1–2	Friendly
3	May 15, 2002	St. Gallen, Switzerland	Switzerland	2–0	3–1	Friendly
4	February 12, 2003	Tripoli, Libya	Libya	3–1	4–2	Friendly
5	March 29, 2003	Tallinn, Estonia	Estonia	1–0	1–2	Friendly
6	July 12, 2003	Foxboro, United States	Costa Rica	1–0	1–0	2003 CONCACAF Gold Cup
7	March 25, 2007	Hamilton, Bermuda	Bermuda	3–0	3–0	Friendly

== Honours ==
=== Player ===
Canada

- CONCACAF Gold Cup: 2000; 3rd place, 2002

Werder Bremen

- Bundesliga: 2003–04
- DFB-Pokal: 1998–99, 2003–04
- DFL-Ligapokal: 2006
- DFB-Hallenpokal runner-up: 2001

Tottenham Hotspur

- Football League Cup: 2007–08

Individual

- CONCACAF Gold Cup All-Tournament team (Honorable Mention): 2007
