= Karim Matmour =

Algerian footballer (born 1985)

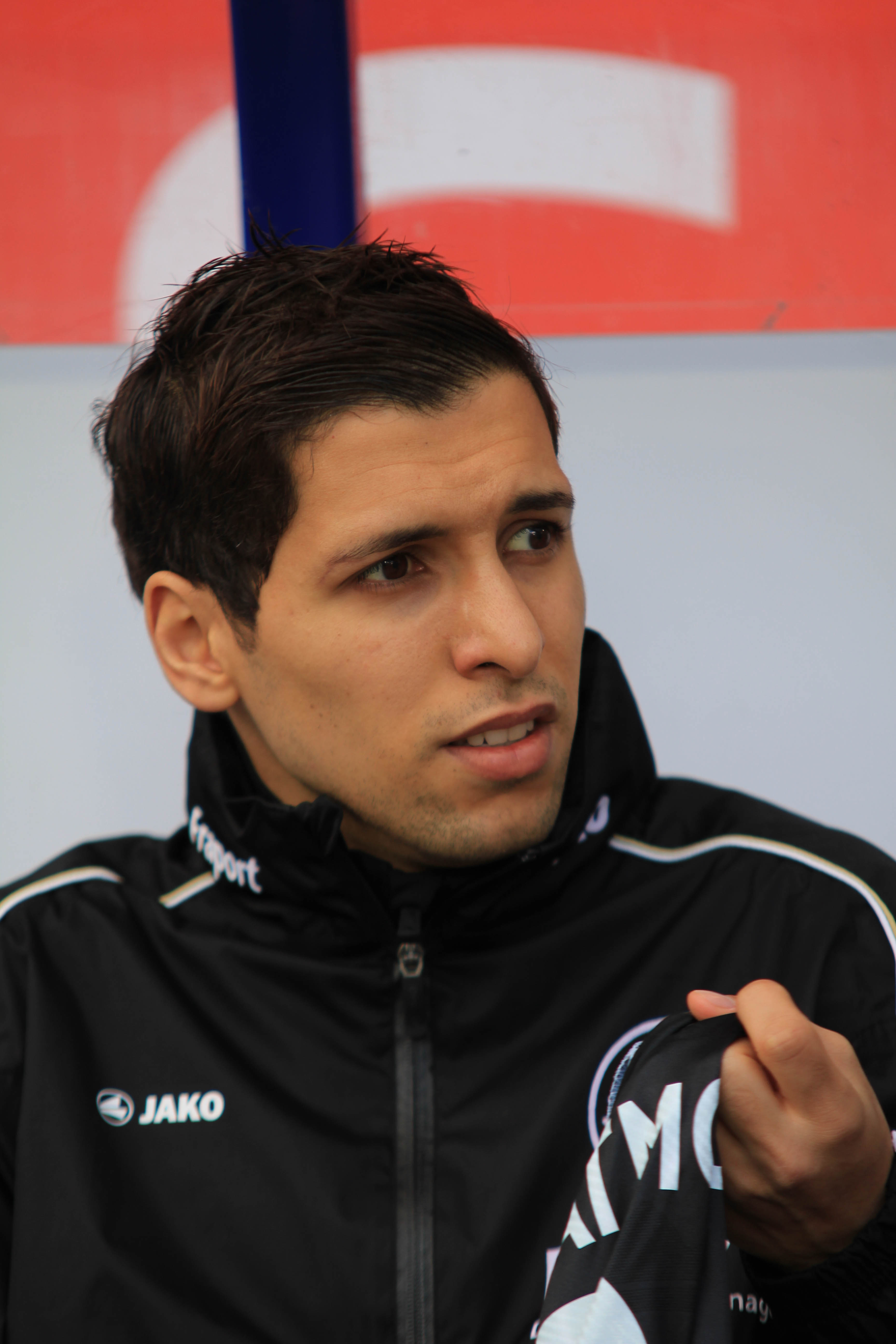
- Matmour with Eintracht Frankfurt

Personal information
- Date of birth: 25 June 1985 (age 41)
- Place of birth: Strasbourg, France
- Height: 1.84 m (6 ft 0 in)
- Position: Winger

Youth career
- 1991–1999: Vauban Strasbourg
- 1999–2003: Strasbourg
- 2003–2004: Vauban Strasbourg
- 2004–2006: SC Freiburg

Senior career*
Years	Team	Apps	(Gls)
2005–2008	SC Freiburg	79	(10)
2008–2011	Borussia Mönchengladbach	77	(4)
2011–2013	Eintracht Frankfurt	52	(7)
2013–2015	1. FC Kaiserslautern	56	(5)
2015	Al-Arabi	2	(2)
2016	Huddersfield Town	16	(1)
2016–2017	1860 Munich	13	(0)
2017	Adelaide United	8	(0)
Total		303	(29)

International career
2007–2012	Algeria	30	(2)
- * Club domestic league appearances and goals

Karim Matmour (Arabic: كريم مطمور; born 25 June 1985) is a former Algerian professional footballer who played as a winger.

During his career, Matmour played for SC Freiburg, Borussia Mönchengladbach, Eintracht Frankfurt, 1. FC Kaiserslautern, Al-Arabi, Huddersfield Town, 1860 Munich and Adelaide United.

An Algerian international from 2007, Matmour featured at the 2010 FIFA World Cup and 2010 Africa Cup of Nations. During his career, he won 30 international caps and scored twice.

== Club career ==
=== SC Freiburg ===
Born in Strasbourg, France, Matmour joined hometown club Vauban Strasbourg when he was six years old. He then joined RC Strasbourg, where he began his playing career. After coming through the academy ranks, he failed to make it into the first team and was then rejected by Racing CFF. He subsequently returned to Vauban Strasbourg before leaving for Germany to join SC Freiburg in 2004.

After spending his first season with the club's reserve side, Matmour was eventually promoted to the senior side in the second half of the 2005–06 season. He made his SC Freiburg first team debut on 28 January 2006, coming on as a substitute for Ibrahim Tanko in the 67th minute, in a 1–0 win over Dynamo Dresden. In a match against 1860 Munich on 27 February 2006, Matmour set up a goal for Aleksandre Iashvili, who went on to score twice, in a 2–1 win. On 3 May 2006, he scored his first goals, in a 2–1 win over Hansa Rostock. His assists in the last two matches against Alemannia Aachen and Greuther Fürth saw the club win both matches, but failed to bounce back to Bundesliga after finishing fourth place in the league. At the end of the 2005–06 season, Matmour made a total of 16 appearances and scoring two times in all competitions.

In the 2006–07 season, Matmour continued to feature in the first team at the start of the season with SC Freiburg. He then set up for the first two goals in the match, in a 3–3 draw against Greuther Fürth on 22 September 2006. However, Matmour suffered a knee injury that saw him sidelined for the rest of the year. But he made his return to the starting line–up against Hansa Rostock on 22 January 2007 and helped the club win 1–0. On 15 April 2007, Matmour scored his first goal of the season, in a 3–0 win over 1. FC Köln. He later scored two more goals, coming against Karlsruher SC and TuS Koblenz, as SC Freiburg finished fourth place in the league. At the end of the 2006–07 season, Matmour finished the season, making 33 appearances and scoring three times in all competitions.

Ahead of the 2007–08 season, Matmour signed a contract extension with SC Freiburg, keeping him until 2010. At the start of the season, he remained in the first team regular for the side, rotating in playing either midfield positions and striker position. Matmour's first goal of the season came on 26 September 2007 against 1. FC Köln and setting up the club's second goal of the game, in a 3–1 win. A month later, he added two more goals for SC Freiburg, coming against FC St. Pauli and Hamburger SV. Shortly after, Matmour suffered a thigh injury that saw him miss one match. But he made his return to the starting line–up against 1860 Munich on 25 November 2007 and helped SC Freiburg draw 2–2. Following his return from injury, Matmour regained his first team place for the rest of the season despite facing another sideline along the way. His fourth goal of the season came on 17 February 2008 against FC Augsburg and scored the only goal of the game, in a 1–0 win. He later scored two more goals later in the 2007–08 season, coming against 1860 Munich and Borussia Mönchengladbach. At the end of the 2007–08 season, Matmour went on to make 34 appearances and scoring six times in all competitions, as the club finished fifth place. By the time of his departure, he made 79 league appearances in three seasons in the 2. Bundesliga.

=== Borussia Mönchengladbach ===
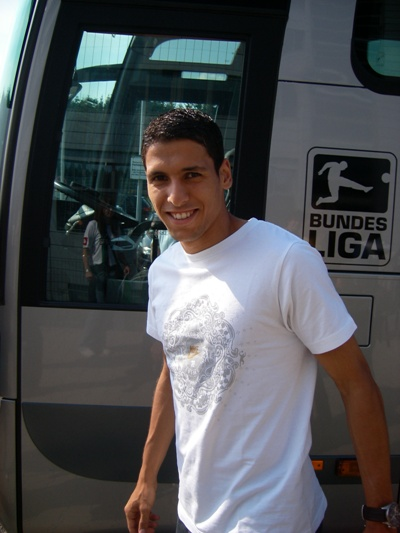
Matmour pictured in 2008 during his time at Borussia Mönchengladbach.

On 4 June 2008, Matmour joined newly promoted Bundesliga club Borussia Mönchengladbach on a four-year contract, with the team paying his former club SC Freiburg €2 million for the transfer.

Matmour made his Borussia Mönchengladbach debut, where he started and played 61 minutes before coming off as a substitute, in an 8–1 win over VfB Fichte Bielefeld in the first round of DFB-Pokal. A week later, on 17 August 2008, Matmour made his league debut for the club, starting the whole game, in a 3–1 loss against VfB Stuttgart in the opening game of the season. Two weeks later, on 30 August 2008, he scored his first goal for Borussia Mönchengladbach, in a 3–2 win over Werder Bremen. Since joining the club, Matmour quickly established himself in the starting eleven for the side. Despite receiving criticism for his lack of goal scoring form, he later scored two more goals for the club as the season progressed and they went on to finish 15th place in the league. Despite missing out one game during the 2008–09 season, Matmour was ever present in the league, as he went on to make 35 appearances and scoring once in all competitions. Matmour finished his first season at Borussia Mönchengladbach, making 35 appearances (34 in the league) and scoring three times in all competitions.

Ahead of the 2009–10 season, Matmour was linked a move away from the club, with Turkish side Fenerbahçe interested in signing him, but he stayed at the club throughout the summer. Matmour then scored his first goal of the season, in a 2–1 win over Hertha BSC on 25 August 2009. Having started out playing in the midfield position, he soon lost his playing time, but regained his first team place, playing in the striker position despite suffering goal drought. This lasted until late December when Matmour found himself out of the starting line–up, due to injuries and international commitment. After the end of African Cup of Nations, he returned to the first team, coming on as a second-half substitute, setting up the winning goal, in a 2–1 win over 1. FC Nürnberg on 12 February 2010. For the rest of the season, Matmour continued to remain in the first team despite his struggles to score and his own injury concerns. At the end of the 2009–10 season, he went on to make 27 appearances and scoring once in all competitions.

On 1 August 2010, during Borussia Mönchengladbach's arranged friendly match versus Liverpool as part of their 110th anniversary celebrations at Borussia Park, Matmour took advantage of some poor play by Daniel Ayala inside the area and produced a powerful finish in the eighth minute. They won the contest thanks to Matmour's goal, with the final score being 1–0. At the start of the 2010–11 season, he suffered three injuries in the first four months to the season. On 6 November 2010, Matmour returned to the first team from injury, coming on as a late substitute, in a 3–3 draw against Bayern Munich. However, his return was short–lived when he missed one match, due to a flu in mid–January, but quickly recovered and returned to the first team against Bayer Leverkusen on 23 January 2011. In a follow–up in a league fixture against Eintracht Frankfurt on 30 January 2011, Matmour came on as a substitute for Mike Hanke in the forty-sixth minute and came close to scoring with a header which bounced off the top of the crossbar but he set up the only goal scored in the encounter which was a cross from the left side to Igor de Camargo, who put the ball away inside the far right post, as the club won 1–0. Since returning from injury, Matmour rotated in and out of the starting line–up, although he remained in the first team for the remainder of the season. Matmour played in both legs of the league's relegation play–offs against VfL Bochum as a late substitute, as Borussia Mönchengladbach won 2–1 on aggregate and retained its Fußball-Bundesliga spot for the 2011–12 season. At the end of the 2010–11 season, he went on to make a total of 23 appearances in all competitions. Following this, Express reported that Matmour could be leaving the club.

=== Eintracht Frankfurt ===
On 1 July 2011, Matmour signed a one-year contract, with Eintracht Frankfurt holding the option of a further two-year extension. The two clubs agreed not to release the transfer fee, therefore the fee was kept as undisclosed. Eintracht Frankfurt chairman Heribert Bruchhagen said: "In signing Karim Matmour we've found the optimal solution for the vacant slot on the right of the attack, in line with (coach) Armin Veh's wishes", about the signing of Matmour.

Matmour quickly made an impact at the club when he scored on his debut, in a 3–2 win over Greuther Fürth in the opening game of the season. Three weeks later on 7 August 2011, Matmour set up two goals for Alexander Meier, who scored twice, in a 3–0 win against Eintracht Braunschweig. Since making his debut for Eintracht Frankfurt, he quickly established himself in the starting eleven for the side, playing in the right–midfield. By the end of 2011, Matmour scored two more goals, coming against FC Ingolstadt 04 and Alemannia Aachen, adding three goals to his tally this season so far. Matmour then scored a hat–trick on 18 February 2012, as well as, setting up one of the club's goals, in a 6–1 win over FSV Frankfurt. After suffering an injury in early–March, Matmour spent the rest of the season in the first team, coming on as a substitute in a number of matches. Despite this, the club was promoted to Bundesliga after he played 14 minutes as a substitute to help Eintracht Frankfurt beat Alemannia Aachen 3–0 on 23 April 2012. At the end of the 2011–12 season, Matmour went on to make 30 appearances and scoring six times in all competitions.

At the start of the 2012–13 season, Matmour was placed on the substitute bench for the first three matches of the season following a thigh injury he sustained. By September, Matmour soon received a handful of playing time, mostly coming from the substitute bench. He then scored his first goal (and only) of the season, in a 3–1 win over Hannover 96 on 20 October 2012. The following month saw the player was sent–off on two occasions, both of them were second bookable offence against Schalke 04 and Fortuna Düsseldorf. Following his return, Matmour continued to find his playing time, coming from the substitute bench for the rest of the 2012–13 season. His contributions helped the club finish sixth place in the league, resulting in Eintracht Frankfurt's qualification in the UEFA Europa League next season. At the end of the 2012–13 season, he went on to make 24 appearances and scoring once in all competitions.

=== 1. FC Kaiserslautern ===
On 21 June 2013, Matmour joined 1. FC Kaiserslautern on a free transfer after his contract at Eintracht Frankfurt came to an end. He joined the club, signing a two–year contract, to become the club's fourth signing of the season.

Matmour made his 1. FC Kaiserslautern debut, where he started the whole game, in a 1–0 win over SC Paderborn in the opening game of the season. Then, on 3 August 2013, Matmour scored his first goal for the club, in a 7–0 win over Neckarsulmer SU in the first round of DFB-Pokal. Since making his debut, he quickly established himself in the first team at 1. FC Kaiserslautern. Matmour then played in the right–back position for the first time after the club was low of right–back position, in a 1–0 loss against SV Sandhausen on 14 September 2013. A week later on 25 September 2013, he scored for the second time in the tournament in the second round of DFB-Pokal, in a 3–1 win over Hertha BSC. On 8 November 2013, Matmour scored his first league goal for 1. FC Kaiserslautern, in a 4–0 win over FSV Frankfurt. His fourth goal of the season came on 23 February 2014, in a 2–1 loss against VfR Aalen. Since the start of the 2013–14 season, he started in every match for the club until he sustained a thigh injury while training, resulting in him missing one match. Matmour returned from injury in a match against Arminia Bielefeld on 26 March 2014, coming on as a second-half substitute, in a 1–1 draw. However, his return was short–lived when he was suspended for picking up five yellow cards this season. His return from suspension later saw him contribute for 1. FC Kaiserslautern by setting up two goals, in a 4–0 win against Dynamo Dresden and then scored his fifth goal of the season, in a 4–2 loss against Fortuna Düsseldorf, as the club finished fourth place in the league. At the end of the 2013–14 season, Matmour finished his first season at 1. FC Kaiserslautern, making 37 appearances and scoring five times in all competitions.

At the start of the 2014–15 season, Matmour scored his first goal of the season and set up one of the goal, in a 2–1 win over Eintracht Braunschweig on 24 August 2014. He started in the club's first nine matches to the season, playing in the right–wing position. However, he missed two matches, due to suffering from a flu. But Matmour returned to the first team, coming on as a second-half substitute, in a 1–1 draw against Fortuna Düsseldorf on 25 October 2014. Two weeks later on 7 November 2014 after returning to the first team, he set up two goals, in a 2–2 draw against VfL Bochum. However, Matmour's return was short–lived when he suffered a flu that saw him miss two matches. But Matmour was able to return to the first team in a match against SV Sandhausen on 21 December 2014 and set up the only goal of the game, in a 1–0 win. However, his return was short–lived once again when he was not involved in the squad due to another flu and returned to the starting line–up, in a 2–1 win against Greuther Fürth on 27 February 2015. Matmour then scored his second goal of the season, in a 4–0 win over 1. FC Heidenheim on 4 April 2015. However, he was sidelined for the rest of the 2014–15 season with a thigh injury and the club went on to finish fourth place in the league once again. At the end of the 2014–15 season, Matmour went on to make 27 appearances and scoring 3 times in all competitions.

With his contract about to end in the summer, Matmour was released by the club after opting against extending his contract.

=== Al-Arabi SC ===
On 17 June 2015, Matmour signed a two-year deal with Al-Arabi of Kuwait after his contract at 1. FC Kaiserslautern came to an end. He previously linked a move to Karlsruher SC before moving to Kuwait.

Matmour made his debut for the club in a 10–1 win against Al-Tadamun SC with scoring the 4th goal of the game. After scoring two goals in as many matches in the Kuwait Federation Cup, Matmour asked Al-Arabi to terminate his contract and filed a complaint against them to FIFA, citing financial aspects. He was subsequently released by Al-Arabi on 31 October 2015.

=== Huddersfield Town ===
On 20 January 2016, after a trial period, Matmour joined English Football League Championship side Huddersfield Town on a contract until the end of the 2015–16 season.

He made his début for the Terriers as a substitute in the 2–1 defeat against Brighton & Hove Albion at Falmer Stadium on 23 January 2016. He made his first start for the Terriers in the 3–2 defeat against Cardiff City on 30 January 2016. Matmour scored his first goal for Huddersfield in the West Yorkshire derby against Leeds United in Huddersfield's 4–1 victory on 19 March 2016.

At the end of the 2015–16 season, where he made 13 appearances and scoring once for the side, Matmour was released from his contract after the club refused to activate a clause in his contract to extend his stay in Yorkshire for another year.

=== 1860 Munich ===
At the start of the 2016–17 season Matmour signed a two-year contract with German 2. Bundesliga club 1860 Munich.

Matmour made his debut for the club, where he started and played for 61 minutes before coming off as a substitute, in a 1–0 loss against Greuther Fürth in the opening game of the season. Two week later, on 20 August 2016, Matmour scored his first goal for 1860 Munich, in the first round of DFB-Pokal, in a 2–1 win over Karlsruher SC. A month later, on 22 September 2016, Matmour played a role during a match against FC St. Pauli, setting up two goals, in a 2–2 draw. However, after handful of first team appearances, Matmour's time at the club was soon overshadowed by injuries and being placed on the sidelines as a result. Although he soon recovered from his injuries, Matmour soon had a fallen out with new Manager Vítor Pereira and was banished to the TSV 1860 Munich II as a result. This also combined with off the pitch issues with 1860 Munich. As a result, his contract with the club was withdrawn in March 2017 despite a year on his contract left. By the time he left the club, Matmour made fourteen appearances and scoring once in all competitions.

=== Adelaide United ===
On 15 August 2017, Matmour signed a 1-year deal with Australian A-League club Adelaide United.

Matmour made his Adelaide United debut, where he started the whole game in the opening game of the season, in a 1–1 draw against Wellington Phoenix. He left Adelaide United in December 2017, terminating his contract early after playing 11 games.

== Post-playing career ==
After leaving Australia, Matmour returned to Germany and was appointed as an assistant manager for Kehler FV in February 2018. However, he stated that he has yet been retired from professional football. After five months at the club, Matmour was appointed as the club's coach. Three months later, it was announced that Matmour was no longer on his coaching duties at the club, but stayed at Kehler FV as an advisory capacity. It was revealed in March 2019 that he passed his UEFA A licence.

In September 2020, Matmour was appointed as a scout for Bayer Leverkusen, having been linked with a move for months.

== International career ==
Matmour received first call up to Algeria against Libya and made his national team debut on 6 February 2007, starting a match and played 55 minutes before coming off, in a 2–1 win.

Two years later, on 7 June 2009, he scored his first ever Algeria international goal, in a 3–1 win over Egypt. Then, on 18 November 2009 against Egypt for the second time this year, Matmour came on as a substitute in the 57th minute and helped the side beat them 1–0 to qualify for the next year's World Cup.

The following month, Matmour was selected by Saâdane to play in the 2010 African Cup of Nations hosted in Angola. At the African Cup Nations, he played his first match of the tournament, where he started and played 62 minutes, in a 3–0 loss against Malawi on 11 January 2010. Matmour scored an equaliser against Ivory Coast and the game went through extra time, as Algeria won 3–2 to ensure their qualification for the semi-finals. For his performance, Matmour was named Man of the Match. However, losses against Egypt and Nigeria saw Algeria finish in fourth place in the tournament.

Matmour was then called by the national team again for the World Cup in South Africa. He played his first World Cup match on Matchday, where he started and played for 81 minutes before coming off a substitute, in a 1–0 loss against Slovenia. He went on to start the next two matches against England and USA, as Algeria ended up eliminated in the group stage, without scoring a single goal.

After the World Cup, Matmour didn't make another Algeria appearance until on 4 June 2011, where he started and played 45 minutes before coming off as substitute at half time, in a 4–0 loss against Morocco. On 3 May 2012, Matmour announced that he would be taking a break from international play to focus on his club career. This was later revealed over his falling out with Manager Vahid Halilhodžić.

== Personal life ==
Growing up in Strasbourg, France to Algerian parents from Tiaret and six siblings, Matmour said he first started football was at "right in front of my house. There were two in my neighborhood, a concrete and a lawn" and idolised Raí. However, Matmour said: "The grades at school had to be right, then I was allowed to go to the table" and once did not play football for a year, describing it as "the worst time of his life." In addition to speaking French, he also speaks German and understands Arabic (he hinted that he would learn the language one day). On his political views in France, Matmour is a critic of Nicolas Sarkozy, accusing him of creating conflicts over derogatory statements against young French immigrants. Matmour is Muslim.

Since 2009, Matmour is married to Algerian-German singer Manel Filali, famous for her work with Anne Ross in the pop duo Milk & Honey.

== Career statistics ==
=== Club ===
Appearances and goals by club, season and competition
Club	Season	League			Cup		Continental		Total	
Club	Season	Division	Apps	Goals	Apps	Goals	Apps	Goals	Apps	Goals
SC Freiburg	2005–06	2. Bundesliga	16	2	–		–		16	2
SC Freiburg	2006–07	2. Bundesliga	31	3	2	0	–		33	3
SC Freiburg	2007–08	2. Bundesliga	32	5	2	1	–		34	6
SC Freiburg	Total		79	10	4	1	0	0	83	11
Borussia Mönchengladbach	2008–09	Bundesliga	34	3	1	0	–		35	3
Borussia Mönchengladbach	2009–10	Bundesliga	25	1	2	0	–		27	1
Borussia Mönchengladbach	2010–11	Bundesliga	18	0	2	0	–		20	0
Borussia Mönchengladbach	Total		77	4	5	0	0	0	72	4
Eintracht Frankfurt	2011–12	2. Bundesliga	28	6	2	0	–		30	6
Eintracht Frankfurt	2012–13	Bundesliga	24	1	0	0	–		24	1
Eintracht Frankfurt	Total		52	7	2	0	0	0	54	7
1. FC Kaiserslautern	2013–14	2. Bundesliga	32	3	5	2	–		37	4
1. FC Kaiserslautern	2014–15	2. Bundesliga	24	2	3	0	–		27	2
1. FC Kaiserslautern	Total		56	5	8	2	0	0	64	7
Al-Arabi	2015–16	Kuwaiti Premier League	2	2	0	0	–		2	2
Huddersfield Town	2015–16	Football League Championship	16	1	0	0	–		16	1
1860 Munich	2016–17	2. Bundesliga	13	0	1	0	–		14	0
Adelaide United	2017–18	A-League	8	0	3	0	–		11	0
Career total			303	29	23	3	0	0	326	32

=== International ===
Scores and results list Algeria's goal tally first, score column indicates score after each Matmour goal.

List of international goals scored by Karim Matmour
No.	Date	Venue	Opponent	Score	Result	Competition
1	7 June 2009	Stade Mustapha Tchaker, Blida, Algeria	Egypt	1–0	3–1	2010 FIFA World Cup qualification (CAF)
2	24 January 2010	Estádio Nacional do Chiazi, Cabinda, Angola	Ivory Coast	1–1	3–2	2010 African Cup of Nations
