= Alexander Voigt =

German footballer (born 1978)

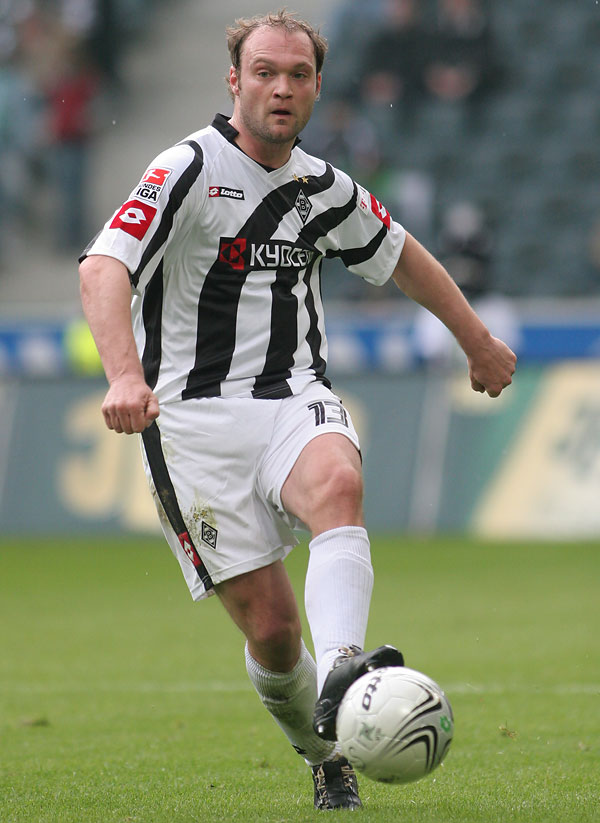
- Voigt in 2008

Personal information
- Date of birth: 13 April 1978 (age 48)
- Place of birth: Cologne, West Germany
- Height: 1.83 m (6 ft 0 in)
- Position: Defender

Youth career
- 1985–1987: Eintracht Köln
- 1987–1998: 1. FC Köln

Senior career*
Years	Team	Apps	(Gls)
1998–2005	1. FC Köln	194	(13)
2005–2006	Roda JC	17	(1)
2007	Carl Zeiss Jena	16	(3)
2007–2009	Borussia Mönchengladbach	39	(0)
2009	Greuther Fürth	9	(0)
2009–2010	FSV Frankfurt	30	(1)
2010–2012	Carl Zeiss Jena	57	(3)
2012–2013	Viktoria Köln	30	(0)
Total		392	(21)

International career
1997–1999	Germany U-21	8	(1)
2002	Germany Team 2006	1	(1)

Managerial career
- 2014–2015: Viktoria Köln (assistant)
- 2015: Viktoria Köln (caretaker)
- 2015–2016: Sportfreunde Siegen (assistant)
- 2016: TV Herkenrath 09 (caretaker)
- 2016–2017: TV Herkenrath 09
- 2017–2018: Fortuna Sittard (assistant)
- 2018–2019: SSVg Velbert
- 2019–2020: Wuppertaler SV
- 2020: Wuppertaler SV
- 2021–2022: KFC Uerdingen 05
- * Club domestic league appearances and goals

Alexander Voigt (born 13 April 1978) is a German football manager and former player.

== Playing career ==
Born in Cologne, Voigt started his career with 1. FC Köln (1998–2005), where he also started to play when he was only nine years old. He also played in the Netherlands for Roda Kerkrade (2005–2006), before moving to FC Carl Zeiss Jena, where he played for only half a year. In 2007, he joined Borussia Mönchengladbach, in winter 2009 he was released by the same club and moved on 12 January 2009 to SpVgg Greuther Fürth. On 15 June 2009, it was announced he would be released by Greuther Fürth and one day later, on 16 June 2009, he signed a contract with FSV Frankfurt. On 15 July 2010, he announced his return to Carl Zeiss Jena but was sacked in March 2012 by the club. In July 2012 he signed for Viktoria Köln.

== Coaching career ==
In January 2014 Voigt was hired as assistant coach of FC Viktoria Köln. In the beginning of December 2014, Voigt was appointed caretaker manager after Claus-Dieter Wollitz was fired. He left the club in the summer 2015 and became assistant manager of Sportfreunde Siegen. He resigned in February 2016 due to disagreements.

On 30 March 2016, Voigt was appointed caretaker manager of TV Herkenrath 09, who had made five promotions in a row in the past five seasons from Kreisliga A to Mittelrheinliga. On 4 May 2016, he was confirmed as the permanent manager of the club after taking 13 out of 15 possible points, 4 wins and 1 draw, in five games and was therefore still unbeaten.

After his experience at Herkenrath, Voigt went to the Netherlands, where he spent the 2017–18 season as an assistant to Sunday Oliseh and Cláudio Braga at Fortuna Sittard. As runner-up of the Eerste Divisie, Fortuna succeeded in advancing into the Eredivisie. In the summer 2018, he was appointed manager of SSVg Velbert. After a bad season and an even worse start to the 2019–20 season, Voigt was fired on 9 September 2019.

As the successor to interim coach Karsten Hutwelker, Voigt took over Wuppertaler SV regional league team in 17th place in October 2019. Due to the financial problems of the association, he held the office until his resignation within the winter break on a voluntary basis. In July 2020 he returned as Wuppertaler SV manager, but he was sacked in December 2020 with the club in 16th place in the Regionalliga West.

On 8 November 2021, he became new manager of KFC Uerdingen 05 in the Regionalliga West. He could not save the club from relegation to the Oberliga, but he remained at the club until he was sacked on 28 November 2022.
