= Damen Shaw =

Australian rules footballer

Personal information
- Full name: Damen Shaw
- Born: 22 April 1974 (age 52)
- Original team: St Peters
- Height: 183 cm (6 ft 0 in)
- Weight: 78 kg (172 lb)

Playing career^{1}
Years	Club	Games (Goals)
1993–1995	St Kilda	40 (15)
1997	Port Adelaide (SANFL)	12 (6)
Total		52 (21)
- ^{1} Playing statistics correct to the end of 1995.

Damen Shaw (born 22 April 1974) is a former Australian rules footballer who played with St Kilda in the Australian Football League (AFL).

Originally from St Peters Football Club, Shaw played senior football with St Kilda for three seasons. He had his best year in 1994, when he amassed 365 disposals from his 21 appearances, which only Nathan Burke and Robert Harvey bettered at St Kilda.

Following his delisting by St Kilda, Shaw transferred to South Australian National Football League (SANFL) side Port Adelaide in 1997, in the hope of being drafted by Port's AFL side but was disappointing, only playing 12 games for six goals for Port Magpies.
