= Steve Gohouri =

Ivorian footballer (1981–2015)

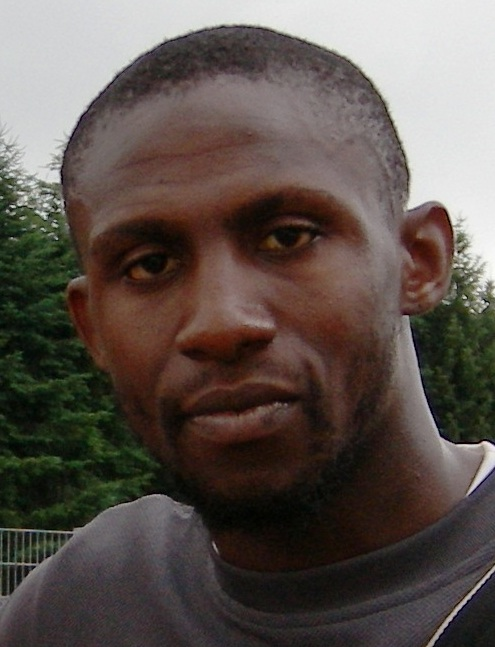
- Gohouri while at Borussia Mönchengladbach in 2007

Personal information
- Full name: Lohoré Steve Ulrich Gohouri
- Date of birth: 8 February 1981
- Place of birth: Treichville, Ivory Coast
- Date of death: 31 December 2015 (aged 34)
- Place of death: Krefeld, Germany
- Height: 1.87 m (6 ft 1 1/2 in)
- Position: Defender

Youth career
- CS Brétigny
- Paris Saint-Germain

Senior career*
Years	Team	Apps	(Gls)
1998–2000	Paris Saint-Germain	0	(0)
2000	Bnei Yehuda	13	(4)
2000–2003	Yverdon-Sport	72	(12)
2003	→ Bologna (loan)	0	(0)
2003–2005	Vaduz	53	(10)
2005–2006	Young Boys	36	(8)
2007–2009	Borussia Mönchengladbach	46	(2)
2009	Borussia Mönchengladbach II	4	(0)
2010–2012	Wigan Athletic	42	(2)
2012–2013	Maccabi Tel Aviv	11	(1)
2013	Skoda Xanthi	2	(0)
2014–2015	Rot-Weiß Erfurt	12	(0)
2015	TSV Steinbach	1	(0)
Total		291	(39)

International career
2006–2011	Ivory Coast	13	(3)
- * Club domestic league appearances and goals

Lohoré Steve Ulrich Gohouri (8 February 1981 – 31 December 2015) was an Ivorian professional footballer who played as a defender.

Gohouri started his career in France, playing in the youth teams at CS Brétigny and Paris Saint-Germain. Due to a lack of first team opportunities, he had a brief spell in Israel with Bnei Yehuda before moving to Switzerland and joining Yverdon-Sport. He spent the next seven seasons in the Swiss leagues, later playing for Vaduz, where he made his debut in a European competition, and Young Boys, where he won a runners-up medal in the Swiss Cup.

In 2007, he signed for Borussia Mönchengladbach in the Bundesliga. He struggled to become a regular in the first team, and was eventually demoted to the reserves in 2009. He was released by the club at the end of the year, and signed for Premier League side Wigan Athletic. He also represented Ivory Coast at international level, but only played sporadically since first appearing for his country in 2006.

On 12 December 2015, Gohouri was reported missing, and he was found dead in the Rhine river almost three weeks later, on New Year's Eve (31 December).

== Club career ==
=== Early career ===
Gohouri was born in Treichville, Ivory Coast. At the age of five, he moved to France with his family, and grew up in the suburbs of Paris. He started his career with CS Brétigny, where he played in the same youth team as Patrice Evra. He then spent two years at Paris Saint-Germain, but failed to break into the first-team. He signed for Israeli side Bnei Yehuda midway through the 1999–2000 season. He made his debut on 5 February 2000 against Hapoel Haifa, scoring the opening goal in a 1–1 draw. He scored two more goals in the next game – a 2–1 win against Beitar Jerusalem, and instantly became a fan favourite at the club. He finished the season with four goals in 13 appearances as the club avoided relegation from the Israeli Premier League with an 11th-place finish.

=== Switzerland ===
He left the club at the end of the season and joined Yverdon-Sport in Switzerland. He was initially signed by the club as a striker, scoring nine goals in his first season at the club as they were relegated from Nationalliga A. He has since played primarily as a central defender, but can also play at right-back or left-back. In January 2003, he moved to Bologna on loan for six months, but did not appear in Serie A during the spell. He moved to Vaduz the following summer. In July 2004, he made his debut in European competition in a UEFA Cup Preliminary Round tie against Longford Town. In September 2005 he signed for Young Boys, having agreed a four-year contract with the club.

=== Borussia Mönchengladbach ===
Gohouri left Young Boys for Borussia Mönchengladbach on a three-and-a-half-year contract on 28 December 2006 for a transfer fee of €1.5 million. He made his Bundesliga debut on 27 January 2007 against Energie Cottbus. In September 2008, Borussia coach Jos Luhukay sent Gohouri to the reserve team after he failed to attend several appointments with the club's medical staff during an injury. He returned to the first team later that month, starting in a 1–0 defeat against Hamburger SV. In October 2008, he scored his first Bundesliga goal for the club, heading in the opening goal in a 2–2 draw against VfL Bochum. In summer 2009, he was again demoted to Borussia's reserves and was ultimately released in December 2009.

=== Wigan Athletic ===
On 12 January 2010, Gohouri joined Wigan Athletic of the Premier League, signing until the end of the season. He scored his first goal for Wigan on 3 May 2010 against Hull City. The equalizer brought the game to 2–2 and relegated Hull, prompting a pitch invasion at the DW Stadium.

On 7 May 2010, Gohouri signed a new two-year contract with Wigan to extend his stay at the club until the end of the 2011–12 campaign. During the 2010–11 season, he made 28 appearances in all competitions, including a goal Gohouri scored against Liverpool in a 1–1 draw on 12 February and was rewarded with another contract extension, keeping him at the club until the summer of 2013. Unfortunately the 2011–12 season started badly for Gohouri, getting sent off against Tottenham Hotspur after picking up a second yellow card during a match on 24 September as well as falling down to the pecking order, making just 10 league appearances. Subsequently, Gohouri was released by Wigan when his contract expired at the end of the 2011–12 season.

=== Maccabi Tel Aviv ===
At the beginning of the 2012/13 season, Gohouri returned to Israel when he joined the ranks of Maccabi Tel Aviv in the first season of Jordy Cruyff as the professional manager. Gohouri participates in 10 league games in which he played as defender. He was released from the team mid-season.

=== Skoda Xanthi ===
On 29 June 2013, Gohouri joined Skoda Xanthi in the Greek Superleague. He made his debut in the UEFA Europa League against Linfield, and made a further two appearances in the league before leaving the club in September 2013.

=== Return to Germany ===
In October 2014, Gohouri signed a contract with German 3. Liga side FC Rot-Weiß Erfurt until the end of the year. The club extended his contract for a further six months in December 2014.

On 3 December 2015, he signed a one-year contract with TSV Steinbach in the Regionalliga.

== International career ==
Gohouri made his debut for the Ivory Coast national team in August 2006 against Senegal. In March 2007, he scored his first two goals for the team in a friendly against Mauritius. He also played in the 2008 African Cup of Nations qualifier against Madagascar in Antananarivo, scoring the opening goal in the 3–0 victory.

=== International goals ===
Scores and results list Ivory Coast's goal tally first.

No.	Date	Venue	Opponent	Score	Result	Competition
1.	21 March 2007	Stade Anjalay, Belle Vue Maurel, Mauritius	Mauritius	2–0	3–0	Friendly
2.	21 March 2007	Stade Anjalay, Belle Vue Maurel, Mauritius	Mauritius	3–0	3–0	Friendly
3.	25 March 2007	Stade Municipal de Mahamasima, Antananarivo, Madagascar	Madagascar	1–0	3–0	2008 Africa Cup of Nations qualification

== Disappearance and death ==
On 12 December 2015, Gohouri was declared missing after his family filed a missing person's report. He was last seen at TSV Steinbach's Christmas party, and was expected to visit his family in Paris, but never arrived. On 2 January 2016, German police confirmed that Gohouri had been found dead on New Year's Eve in the river Rhine near Krefeld. He had drowned.

== See also ==
- List of solved missing person cases (2010s)
