= Robert Fleßers =

German footballer

Personal information
- Date of birth: 11 February 1987 (age 39)
- Place of birth: Viersen, West Germany
- Height: 1.88 m (6 ft 2 in)
- Positions: Full-back; defensive midfielder

Youth career
- 1992–1995: 1. FC Viersen
- 1995–2005: Borussia Mönchengladbach

Senior career*
Years	Team	Apps	(Gls)
2005–2008	Borussia Mönchengladbach	9	(0)
2008–2009	Mainz 05	2	(0)
2009–2011	FC Ingolstadt 04	20	(0)
2011	Rot Weiss Ahlen	20	(0)
2011–2013	Wuppertaler SV	57	(8)
2013–2018	Rot-Weiß Oberhausen	124	(20)
2018–2020	TSV Meerbusch	33	(3)
Total		266	(31)

International career
2007–2008	Germany U21	8	(3)
- * Club domestic league appearances and goals

Robert Fleßers (born 11 February 1987) is a German former professional footballer who played as a full-back or defensive midfielder.

== Club career ==
Fleßers first club was home town club 1. FC Viersen 05 before Borussia Mönchengladbach spotted and signed him. He joined Borussia Mönchengladbach's senior team in 2005. On 22 April 2006 he made his debut in the Bundesliga in a 2–2 draw with Hertha BSC. On 2 May 2008, he announced his departure from Borussia Mönchengladbach and signed a contract with 1. FSV Mainz 05 on 4 June 2008. After only one year with FSV Mainz 05 he joined FC Ingolstadt 04. After a half year in Ahlen, Fleßers joined Wuppertaler SV Borussia. He spent two years with Wuppertal, leaving in July 2013 after the club were relegated from the Regionalliga West, and signing for Rot-Weiß Oberhausen.

== International career ==
Fleßers has played in German national youth teams and the U21.
