= Willem Frans Daems =

Pharmacist, anthroposophist, pianist, teacher and editor

Willem Frans Daems, PhD (3 December 1911 – 29 December 1994) was a pharmacist, anthroposophist, pianist, teacher and editor.

== Life ==
Daems was born in Amsterdam. His grandfather owned a furniture factory and his six sons trained to joiners. His father worked as a hospital administrator and this brought Willem, his eldest son, into familiarity with the medical world.

He studied pharmacy in Amsterdam and wrote his doctorate thesis on the pharmaceutical history of medicinal plants acting as cardiac stimulants. He was also interested in history and linguistics. He had a feeling for art, music and rhetoric. He was an excellent piano player that would give musical interludes during his courses.

He ran the Weleda Arlesheim and Ita Wegman Clinic Choir for many years. He took a leading role in the professional body of Dutch pharmacists. In 1938 Daems worked as a pharmacist in Arnhem and Haarlem, moving to the pharmaceutical industry in 1948 and becoming director of Biochema in Leyden in 1951. There he met anthroposophy through a lecture. He and his wife then attended an introductory course.

1955 he joined Weleda Arlesheim as a pharmacist and developed their documentation centre. In 1961 he edited the Weleda Korrespondenzblaetter fuer Aerzte. In 1965 he became head of the medical department. In 1967 he published a bulletin for Weleda firms to inform them on important development in pharmaceutics. He reviewed a large number of professional journals.

Daems had a continual study of the history of medicine and pharmacy. He was an avid student of the Dutch language and literature, medieval Latin and complementary historical sciences. He covered medievalist researches and developed into a doctoral thesis for his second field of study in 1967. He contributed to the Lexikon des Mittelalters (Lexicon of the Middle Ages) and was called to Wuerzburg University in Germany to teach history of medicine and pharmaceutics in 1973.

He served on the council of the Swiss Paracelsus Society as co-editor of Nova acta Paracelsica and lecturer in pharmacognosy at a college for druggists in Neuchâtel. He had contact with Professor Gundolf Keil who was the chair of history of medicine at Wuerzburg. 1980 was appointed vice-president of the Swiss Society for History of Pharmacy. He died in Arlesheim, aged 83.

== Works ==
A list of his publications includes more than 190 titles, about 50 of them in Dutch. One of his works with P.G. Bellmann and G. Keil as co-authors, concerns Rudolf Steiner's priority in suggesting mistletoe as a medicinal for cancer, another Ita Wegman's first clinical use of mistletoe on that indication. Daems wrote many book reviews and re-published out of print works by his predecessors with explanatory prefaces. He gave numerous courses for physicians, pharmacists, chemists and Weleda staff.

At the request of the Medical Section of the Goetheanum he gave a course on the history of pharmacy from antiquity to the present time in his life. It was published as part of the Persephone Series by the Medical Section in 2001.
