= Oliver Stang =

German footballer

Personal information
- Full name: Oliver Stang
- Date of birth: 26 June 1988 (age 38)
- Place of birth: Bad Bergzabern, West Germany
- Height: 1.94 m (6 ft 4 in)
- Position: Defender

Youth career
- –2005: SG Andernach
- 2005–2007: Borussia Mönchengladbach

Senior career*
Years	Team	Apps	(Gls)
2007–2009	Borussia Mönchengladbach II	73	(3)
2009–2011	VfL Osnabrück	44	(4)
2011–2012	SV Eintracht Trier 05	27	(1)
2012–2018	Borussia Mönchengladbach II	180	(18)
2018–2020	SV Elversberg	14	(3)

Managerial career
- 2021–202X: 1. FC Bocholt (staff)
- * Club domestic league appearances and goals

Oliver Stang (born 26 June 1988 in Bad Bergzabern) is a retired German footballer who was a defender and last played for SV Elversberg in the Regionalliga Südwest.

Stang made 24 appearances in the 2. Bundesliga as well as a further 20 3. Liga games during his playing career before his transfer in 2011 to SV Eintracht Trier 05 in the Regionalliga West.

After ending his career, Stang was hired as "Coordinator Analysis and Scouting" for 1. FC Bocholt in May 2021.
