= Tobias Levels =

German footballer

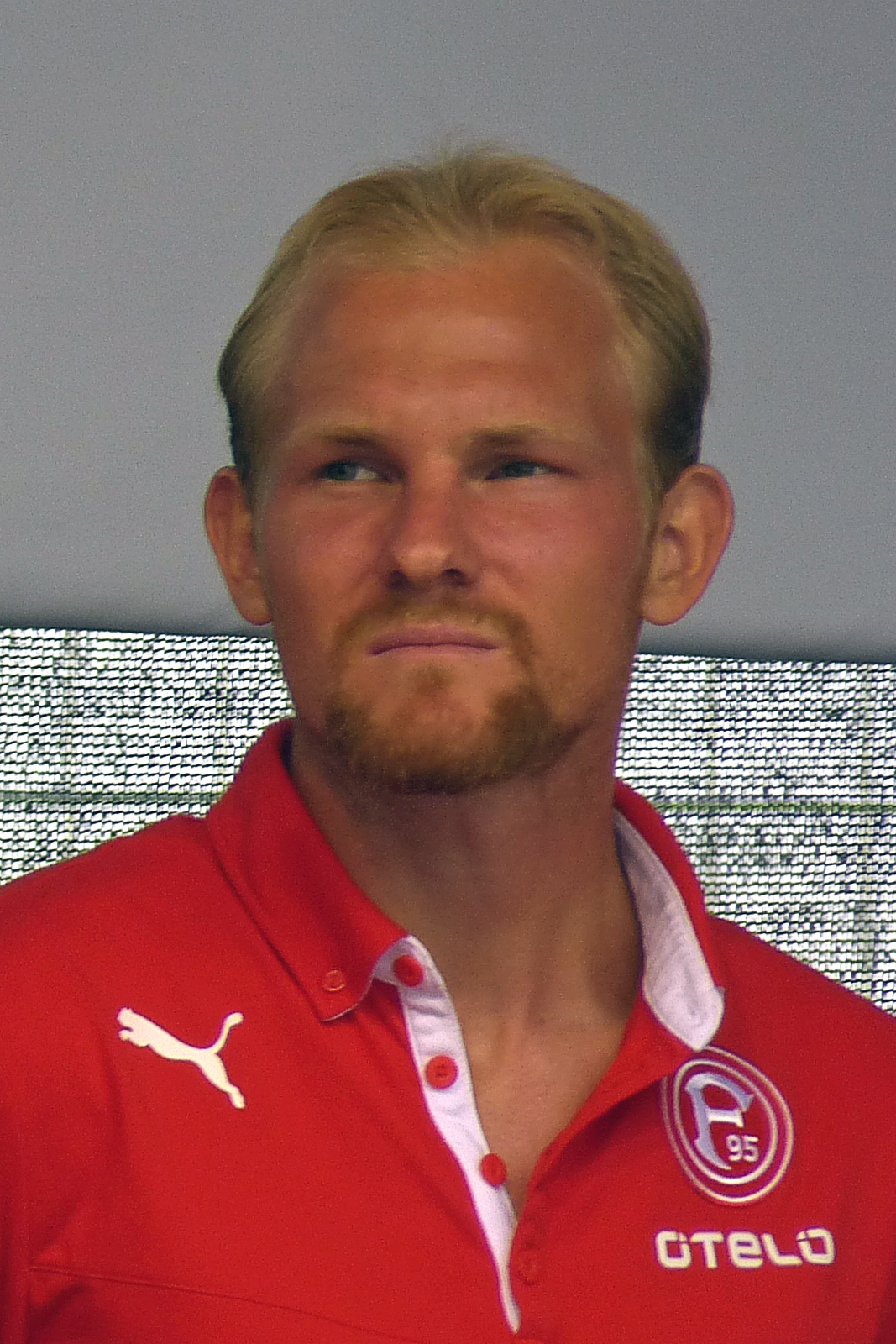
- Levels with Fortuna Düsseldorf in 2013

Personal information
- Date of birth: 22 November 1986 (age 39)
- Place of birth: Tönisvorst, West Germany
- Height: 1.86 m (6 ft 1 in)
- Position: Defender

Youth career
- SV 1911 St. Tönis
- –1999: KFC Uerdingen
- 1999–2005: Borussia Mönchengladbach

Senior career*
| Years | Team | Apps | (Gls) |
| 2005–2009 | Borussia Mönchengladbach II | 45 | (2) |
| 2006–2012 | Borussia Mönchengladbach | 110 | (1) |
| 2011–2012 | → Fortuna Düsseldorf (loan) | 26 | (0) |
| 2012–2014 | Fortuna Düsseldorf | 49 | (0) |
| 2014–2018 | FC Ingolstadt | 69 | (2) |
| 2016–2017 | FC Ingolstadt II | 8 | (0) |
| Total | | 307 | (5) |
- * Club domestic league appearances and goals

Tobias Levels (born 22 November 1986) is a German former professional footballer who played as a defender.

== Club career ==
Levels began his career at his home club SV St. Tönis. He then went to KFC Uerdingen before moving to Borussia Mönchengladbach in July 1999. There, he initially played regularly in the second team, with whom he was promoted to the Regionalliga Nord, then the third tier of the German football league system, in the 2005–06 season.

Under Mönchengladbach head coach Jupp Heynckes, Levels participated in training with the professionals for the first time prior to the 2006–07 season. On 10 September 2006, he made his debut for the first team in a DFB-Pokal match against SV Roßbach. On 30 September 2006, Levels made his Bundesliga debut in an away game at Werder Bremen in a 3–0 loss, coming on as a substitute during the second half. Two match days later, he made his first appearance in the starting eleven against VfL Wolfsburg playing the entire 90 minutes of a 3–1 win. Levels scored his first Bundesliga goal on 7 March 2009 in a 4–1 win against Hamburger SV. Levels was loaned out to 2. Bundesliga side Fortuna Düsseldorf for the 2011–12 season, where he became a regular starter at the right-back and finished the season in third place with his club. He appeared as a starter in both relegation playoff legs against Hertha BSC, in which Fortuna won 4–3 on aggregate und secured promotion to the Bundesliga. He was signed permanently for the 2012–13 season, signing a contract until 30 June 2014.

After his contract with Fortuna Düsseldorf had expired, Levels was a free agent for more than three months. In November 2014 he went to trial with 2. Bundesliga club FC Ingolstadt and was subsequently signed for the remainder of the season. Ingolstadt reacted thereby to the injury of their regular right back Danny da Costa. At the end of the 2014–15 season, he was promoted to the Bundesliga with his club. In the first half of the 2015–16 season, Levels was a permanent starter for Ingolstadt and only missed one match due to a yellow card suspension, however, he missed the entire second half of the season due to an ankle injury. On 31 May 2016, Levels extended his contract at FC Ingolstadt until 2018.

On 27 March 2017, FC Ingolstadt 04 announced that Levels would play for the under-23 team in the future. The reason for this was a dispute with the coach, Maik Walpurgis. After Stefan Leitl succeeded Walpurgis as coach at the end of August 2017, Levels once again became an integral part of the Ingolstadt squad. His contract with FC Ingolstadt 04 ran until the end of the 2017–18 season. Levels ended his active football career in the summer of 2018 and moved back to Mönchengladbach.
