= VfB Fichte Bielefeld =

Fichte Bielefeld
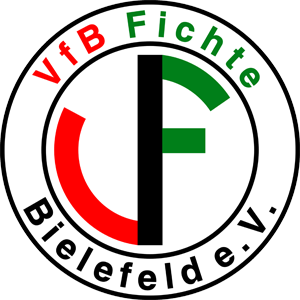
- Full name: VfB Fichte Bielefeld e.V.
- Founded: 1903; 123 years ago
- Ground: Bezirkssportanlage Rußheide
- Capacity: 12,000
- League: Landesliga Westfalen (VII)
- 2015–16: Westfalenliga 1 (VI), 14th (relegated)
Home colours	Away colours

VfB Fichte Bielefeld is a German association football club based in Bielefeld, North Rhine-Westphalia. The club was formed out of the merger of VfB Bielefeld 03 and SpVgg Fichte Bielefeld 06/07 on 1 July 1999.

== History ==
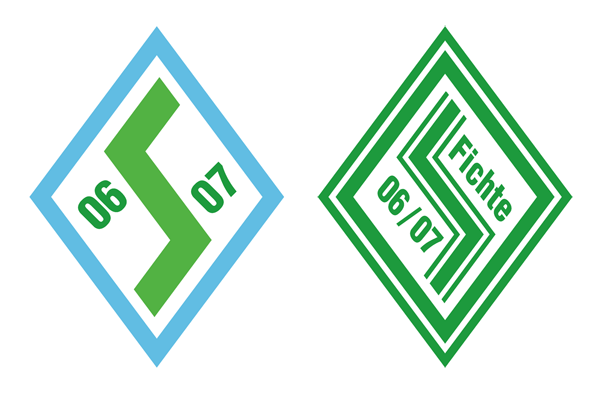
Historical logos of predecessor side SpVgg Bielefeld.

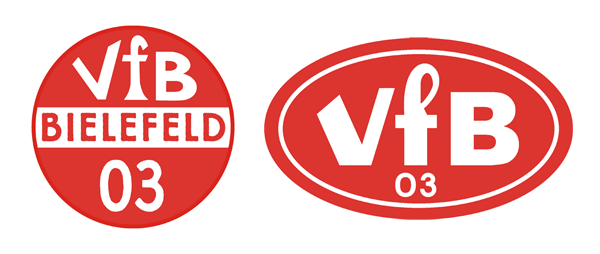
Historical logos of predecessor side VfB Bielefeld.

Of these predecessor sides VfB Bielefeld 03 was the more successful, as SpVgg remained an anonymous local side. In 1931 VfB finished runners-up in the Western German football championship. Two years later German football was re-organized under the Third Reich into sixteen top flight divisions and VfB eventually earned promotion to the Gauliga Westfalen in 1941. However, they were immediately relegated after finishing at the bottom of the table well back of other clubs. In 1943 VfB joined Arminia Bielefeld in the wartime side (Kriegspielgemeinschaft) KSG VfB/DSC Arminia Bielefeld to play to the Gauliga. The combined side also finished last, but remained in the top flight through the incomplete 1944–45 season as the league struggled to continue play as Allied armies advanced on Germany.

After the war the two clubs resumed play as separate sides. VfB's best result was ascent into the 2. Oberliga West in 1950 and participation in the semi-finals of the German amateur championship. Through the 60s and into the early 70s the club played as a third division side in the Verbandsliga Westfalen-NO, before slipping and bouncing between fourth and fifth tier competition until the end of the 90s.

SpVgg played in the Landesliga Westfalen (IV) during most of this period, with the occasional descent to the Verbandsliga (V) or Bezirksliga Westfalen (VI).

At the time of their 1999 merger VfB and SpVgg were both competing in the Verbandsliga Westfalen (V). Two years later the new club was promoted to the Oberliga Westfalen (IV) where they remained until being sent down in 2006. From 2013 to 2016 the club was part of the tier six Westalenliga again until relegated to the Landesliga.

== Honours ==
The club's honours: VfB Bielefeld

- Western German football championship
  - Runners-up: 1931
- Verbandsliga Westfalen
  - Champions: 1973

VfB Fichte Bielefeld

- Verbandsliga Westfalen
  - Champions: 2001

== Stadium ==
Fichte plays its home matches at the Stadion Rußheide which has a capacity of ~12,000 spectators.
