= Christian Dorda =

German footballer

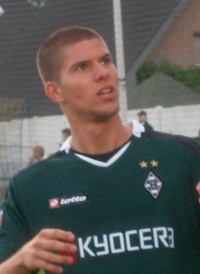
- Dorda in 2009

Personal information
- Date of birth: 6 December 1988 (age 37)
- Place of birth: Mönchengladbach, West Germany
- Height: 1.82 m (6 ft 0 in)
- Position: Left-back

Team information
- Current team: SSVg Velbert (assistant coach)

Youth career
- –1996: SC Wegberg
- 1996–2007: Borussia Mönchengladbach

Senior career*
Years	Team	Apps	(Gls)
2006–2011	Borussia Mönchengladbach II	39	(0)
2008–2011	Borussia Mönchengladbach	7	(0)
2011–2012	Greuther Fürth	0	(0)
2011–2012	Greuther Fürth II	20	(0)
2012–2014	Heracles Almelo	31	(0)
2012–2014	→ Heracles Almelo U21	14	(2)
2014	Utrecht	9	(0)
2014–2015	Westerlo	15	(0)
2015–2017	Hansa Rostock	38	(1)
2017–2021	KFC Uerdingen 05	139	(4)
2021–2022	SSVg Velbert	29	(2)

Managerial career
- 2022–: SSVg Velbert (assistant)
- * Club domestic league appearances and goals

Christian Dorda (born 6 December 1988) is a German professional football coach and a former player who played as a left-back. He is an assistant coach with SSVg Velbert.

== Career ==
Born in Mönchengladbach, Dorda made his debut for his hometown club Borussia Mönchengladbach's main squad on 8 November 2008 when he started in a Bundesliga game against Arminia Bielefeld. In June 2011, he joined Greuther Fürth.

On 10 July 2012, Dorda signed a two-year contract with Dutch club Heracles Almelo with an option for a third year. After playing 31 matches for Heracles, Dorda was sold to FC Utrecht on 30 January 2014. He signed for 2.5 years. After he could not impress with Utrecht, he left on a free transfer and signed with Belgian side Westerlo.

In summer 2015, Dorda joined Hansa Rostock for two years.
