= Moses Lamidi =

German-Nigerian footballer

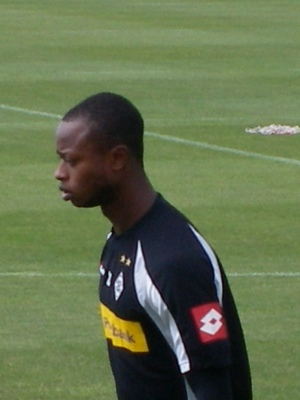
- Lamidi with Borussia Mönchengladbach

Personal information
- Date of birth: 5 January 1988 (age 38)
- Place of birth: Lagos, Nigeria
- Height: 1.77 m (5 ft 10 in)
- Position: Forward

Youth career
- –2003: Alemannia Aachen
- 2003–2006: Borussia Mönchengladbach

Senior career*
Years	Team	Apps	(Gls)
2006–2010	Borussia Mönchengladbach II	62	(19)
2007–2010	Borussia Mönchengladbach	13	(0)
2010–2011	Rot-Weiß Oberhausen	18	(6)
2011–2012	Karlsruher SC	2	(0)
2012–2013	FSV Frankfurt	3	(0)
2013–2015	KFC Uerdingen 05	38	(5)
2015	Schwarz-Weiß Rehden	12	(3)
2015–2016	Vejle	12	(1)
2016–2017	Schwarz-Weiß Rehden	17	(6)
2017	FC Kray	15	(8)
2017–2018	SSVg Velbert	20	(1)
2018–2024	Ratingen 04/19	143	(31)
Total		355	(80)

International career
2008–2010	Germany U20	5	(1)
- * Club domestic league appearances and goals

Moses Lamidi (born 5 January 1988) is a German-Nigerian former professional footballer who played as a forward.

== Early life ==
Lamidi was born in Lagos, Nigeria. He began his career in Alemannia Aachen's youth team and signed 2003 an youth contract for Borussia Mönchengladbach. In summer 2006 he was promoted to the reserve team.

== Club career ==
Lamidi started his professional career with Borussia Mönchengladbach, making his first appearance on 31 March 2007 in the Bundesliga against Eintracht Frankfurt. On 1 March 2010, the director of sport of Borussia Mönchengladbach, Max Eberl, announced that Lamidi's contract will not be renewed. The 22-year-old Nigerian played with the club since 2003 and has played 13 Bundesliga games. On 18 May 2010, he signed a two-year contract for Rot-Weiß Oberhausen.

On 10 July 2015, Lamidi signed a contract with Danish 1st Division-side Vejle BK. He lefft the club in 2016.

== International career ==
Between 2008 and 2010 Lamidi played five games for the Germany national under-20 football team and scored one goal.
