= Dahmen (surname) =

Dahmen is a German surname. Notable people with the surname include:

- Andrea Dahmen (born 1939), German actress
- Aymen Dahmen (born 1997), Tunisian professional footballer
- Cathee Dahmen (1945–1997), model in the 1960s and 1970s
- Finn Dahmen (born 1998), German footballer
- Jan Dahmen (1898–1957), Dutch violinist
- Janosch Dahmen (born 1981), German politician
- Joel Dahmen (born 1987), American professional golfer
- Josef Dahmen (1903–1985), German actor
- Julia Dahmen (born 1977), German television actress
- Karin Dahmen (born 1969), German physicist
- Udo Dahmen (born 1951), German drummer and author
- Wolfgang Dahmen (born 1949), German mathematician
