= Jean-Sébastien Jaurès =

French footballer (born 1977)

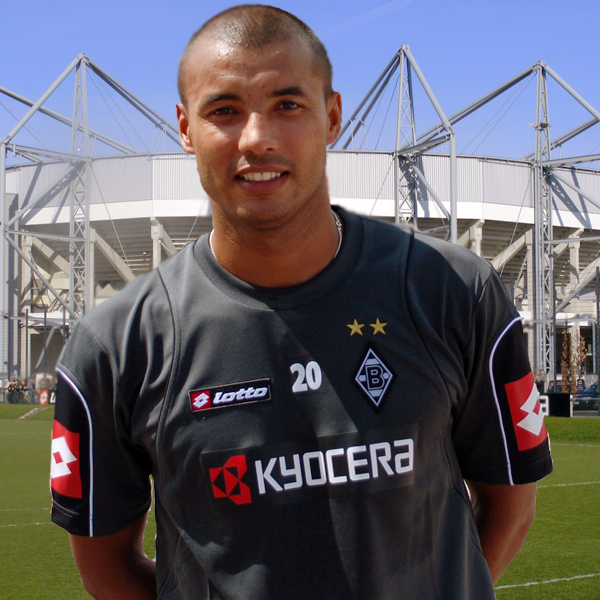

Personal information
- Full name: Jean-Sébastien Jaurès
- Date of birth: 30 September 1977 (age 49)
- Place of birth: Tours, France
- Height: 1.75 m (5 ft 9 in)
- Position: Defender

Youth career
- 1991–1996: Auxerre

Senior career*
Years	Team	Apps	(Gls)
1996–2008	Auxerre	218	(3)
2008–2011	Borussia Mönchengladbach	20	(0)
Total		238	(3)

International career
1998	France U21	1	(0)
- * Club domestic league appearances and goals

Jean-Sébastien Jaurès (French pronunciation: [ʒɑ̃ sebastjɛ̃ ʒɔʁɛs]; born 30 September 1977) is a French former professional footballer who played as defender for AJ Auxerre and Bundesliga club Borussia Mönchengladbach. Whilst at Auxerre he helped them win the Coupe de France in 2005, starting in the final.
