= Frederic Löhe =

German footballer

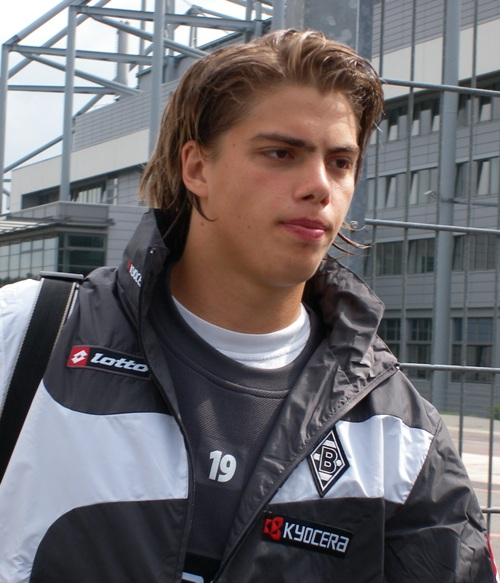
- Löhe with Borussia Mönchengladbach

Personal information
- Full name: Frederic Löhe
- Date of birth: 12 August 1988 (age 38)
- Place of birth: Engelskirchen, West Germany
- Height: 1.93 m (6 ft 4 in)
- Position: Goalkeeper

Team information
- Current team: FC Gießen
- Number: 1

Youth career
- 1993–1999: TuS Elsenroth
- 1999–2001: FV Wiehl
- 2001–2004: 1. FC Köln
- 2004–2006: Borussia Mönchengladbach

Senior career*
Years	Team	Apps	(Gls)
2006–2011	Borussia Mönchengladbach II	86	(0)
2007–2011	Borussia Mönchengladbach	1	(0)
2010–2011	→ SV Sandhausen (loan)	17	(0)
2012–2013	SV Babelsberg 03	36	(0)
2013–2015	Alemannia Aachen	91	(0)
2015–2019	TSV Steinbach	101	(0)
2019–2022	FC Gießen	104	(0)
2022–	Schönenbach		
- * Club domestic league appearances and goals as of 10 October 2023

Frederic Löhe (born 12 August 1988) is a German football goalkeeper who currently plays for SV Schönenbach.

== Career ==
On 28 October 2008, he made his debut for Borussia Mönchengladbach's first team on a Bundesliga match in a 3–0 away loss against VfL Wolfsburg.
