= Sisters of St. Francis of the Holy Cross =

American Catholic women's religious institute

Coordinates: 44°33′20.6″N 87°54′26.4″W

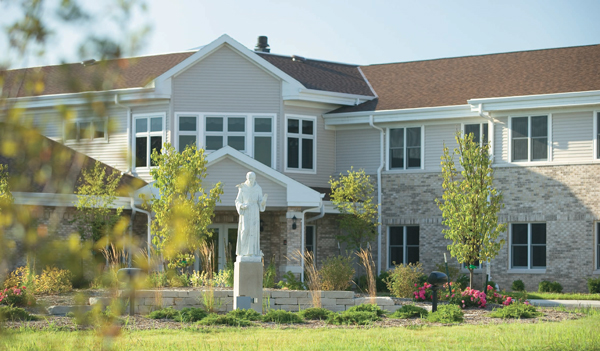
Built in 2006, our Motherhouse residence includes a chapel. Our former Motherhouse on Bay Settlement Road was our home from our inception in 1868.

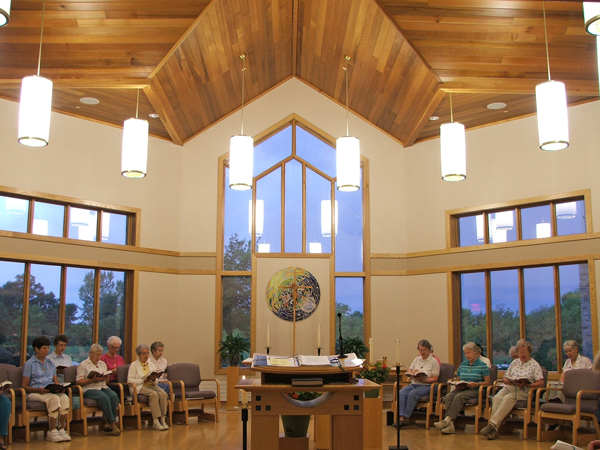
Along with daily Mass, our Sisters pray together each morning and evening.

The Sisters of St. Francis of the Holy Cross are a diocesan community of religious women who live according to the Rule of St. Francis of Assisi in Northeastern Wisconsin. In essence, the sisters practice "simplicity, hospitality, and prayer that is centered on the Cross of Jesus Christ, the sacred Word of Scripture, and the Holy Eucharist."

== History ==
This Catholic community of women was founded in 1868 by Father Edward Daems (1826 - 1879) who came to northeastern Wisconsin to minister to the local Belgian immigrants. Seeing the need for teachers, Father Daems asked two local women – Pauline LaPlante ( - 1926) and Christine Rousseau ( - 1900) – to come home from their formation with the Dominican Order in Racine, Wisconsin, (about 150 miles south), to teach and provide medical care to the Belgian residents. Sisters LaPlante and Rousseau accepted Father Daems' request. With the help of Sister Pius Doyle and Mary Van Lanen, a neighboring farm girl, the four women became the religious community's founding members.

In 1881, the women were officially recognized as a diocesan community by the Roman Catholic Diocese of Green Bay, Wisconsin, which marked 1868 as an important year in its history, the year when also the Diocese of Green Bay was created from the Roman Catholic Archdiocese of Milwaukee.

With the motherhouse located in rural Green Bay, the Sisters spent their early years primarily teaching the area schoolchildren and farming much of their land in Brown County. As membership grew, the Sisters accepted more teaching requests from parish priests and expanded their religious instruction to the Chapel in Robinsonville, Wisconsin, in 1902. The chapel, now known as the Shrine of Our Lady of Good Help, is well known to the local population as where the Virgin Mary is reported to have appeared to Sister Adele Brice and instructed Adele to teach the children their Catholic faith.

== See also ==
- Third Order of St. Francis
