= Filip Daems =

Belgian footballer

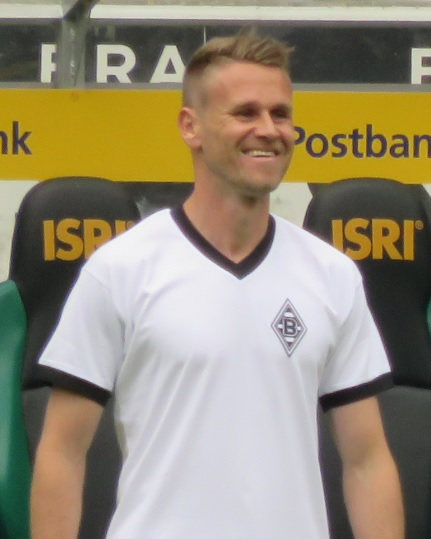
- Daems with Borussia Mönchengladbach in 2015

Personal information
- Date of birth: 31 October 1978 (age 48)
- Place of birth: Turnhout, Belgium
- Height: 1.81 m (5 ft 11 in)
- Position: Defender

Youth career
- 1986–1989: FCV Alberta Geel
- 1989–1998: Geel

Senior career*
Years	Team	Apps	(Gls)
1998–2001	Lierse	83	(3)
2001–2005	Gençlerbirliği	98	(13)
2005–2015	Borussia Mönchengladbach	210	(14)
2015–2017	Westerlo	51	(3)
Total		442	(33)

International career
2000	Belgium U18	1	(0)
1998–1999	Belgium U21	9	(0)
2004–2009	Belgium	7	(0)
- * Club domestic league appearances and goals

Filip Daems (Dutch pronunciation: [ˈfilɪb ˈdaːms]; born 31 October 1978) is a Belgian former professional footballer who played as a defender.

== Club career ==
Daems kicked off his career with Verbroedering Geel in 1995, staying with the club till 1998 in the Belgian second division. During his stint with the club, he played 40 times and also scored two goals. Between 1998 and 2001, he played for Belgian Pro League club, featuring 83 times and finding the net thrice. Then he went to play for Turkish club Gençlerbirliği from 2001 to 2005, spending four seasons, playing 98 times and finding the net 13 times.

In January 2005, Daems signed for German club Borussia Mönchengladbach, penning a contract till June 2008. In his first season with the club, he played 11 times without scoring a goal. He would play the first match of the 2005–06 season against Schalke 04 in single goal draw. He would end the season featuring 22 times for the German club. However, he spent the 2006–07 season with the reserves, Borussia Mönchengladbach II, in the Regionalliga Nord, the then third tier of German football. For the 2007–08 season, the club played in 2. Bundesliga and Daems even scored a goal against 1. FC Köln. Mönchengladbach won the second tier and gained promotion to the 2008–09 Bundesliga. During that season, he scored two goals, one against Eintracht Frankfurt and one against Bayern Munich. In the 2009–10 season, he played 18 times scoring one goal. The goal was scored against TSG 1899 Hoffenheim, where he scored a 31st-minute penalty. In the 2010–11 season, he played the whole ninety minutes of each of the 34 league matches. Daems also scored four times against Schalke 04, VfL Wolfsburg, Hoffenheim and Köln.

== Career statistics ==
=== Club ===
Appearances and goals by club, season and competition
Club	Season	League			Cup		Europe		Total	
Club	Season	Division	Apps	Goals	Apps	Goals	Apps	Goals	Apps	Goals
Lierse	1998–99	Belgian Pro League	27	1	0	0	0	0	27	1
Lierse	1999–00	Belgian Pro League	26	1	0	0	2	0	28	1
Lierse	2000–01	Belgian Pro League	28	1	0	0	2	0	30	1
Lierse	Total		81	3	0	0	4	0	85	3
Gençlerbirliği	2001–02	Süper Lig	25	2	0	0	2	0	27	2
Gençlerbirliği	2002–03	Süper Lig	27	7	0	0	0	0	27	7
Gençlerbirliği	2003–04	Süper Lig	29	2	0	0	4	2	33	4
Gençlerbirliği	2004–05	Süper Lig	15	2	0	0	2	0	17	2
Gençlerbirliği	Total		96	13	0	0	8	2	104	15
Borussia Mönchengladbach	2004–05	Bundesliga	11	0	0	0	0	0	11	0
Borussia Mönchengladbach	2005–06	Bundesliga	22	0	2	0	0	0	24	0
Borussia Mönchengladbach	2006–07	Bundesliga	0	0	0	0	0	0	0	0
Borussia Mönchengladbach	2007–08	2. Bundesliga	27	1	1	0	0	0	28	1
Borussia Mönchengladbach	2008–09	Bundesliga	33	2	2	0	0	0	35	2
Borussia Mönchengladbach	2009–10	Bundesliga	18	1	0	0	0	0	18	1
Borussia Mönchengladbach	2010–11	Bundesliga	34	4	2	0	0	0	36	4
Borussia Mönchengladbach	2011–12	Bundesliga	31	3	5	1	0	0	36	4
Borussia Mönchengladbach	2012–13	Bundesliga	19	1	2	0	4	1	25	2
Borussia Mönchengladbach	2013–14	Bundesliga	15	2	1	0	0	0	16	2
Borussia Mönchengladbach	2014–15	Bundesliga	0	0	0	0	0	0	0	0
Borussia Mönchengladbach	Total		210	14	15	1	4	1	229	19
Westerlo	2015–16	Belgian Pro League	22	1	1	0	0	0	23	1
Westerlo	2016–17	Belgian Pro League	29	2	1	0	0	0	30	2
Westerlo	Total		51	3	2	0	0	0	53	3
Career total			438	33	17	1	16	3	471	37

== Honours ==
Lierse

- Belgian Cup: 1998–99
- Belgian Super Cup: 1999

Borussia Mönchengladbach

- 2. Bundesliga: 2007–08
