= List of German football transfers summer 2009 =

This is a list of German football transfers in the summer transfer window 2009 by club. Only transfers of the Bundesliga, and 2. Bundesliga are included.

== Bundesliga ==
=== VfL Wolfsburg ===
In:

Out:

Note: Flags indicate national team as has been defined under FIFA eligibility rules. Players may hold more than one non-FIFA nationality.

No.	Pos.	Nation	Player
8	MF	DEN	Thomas Kahlenberg (from AJ Auxerre)
11	FW	NGA	Obafemi Martins (from Newcastle United F.C.) (Note: Obafemi Martins wechselt zu Wolfsburg)
14	MF	PAR	Jonathan Santana (loan return from San Lorenzo de Almagro)
15	MF	ALG	Karim Ziani (from Olympique Marseille)
16	DF	GER	Fabian Johnson (from 1860 Munich)
28	MF	GER	Daniel Baier (loan return from FC Augsburg) (Note: "Wer geht, wer bleibt?" (in German). Augburger Allgemeine. 19 May 2009.)
--	FW	GER	Fabian Klos (from MTV Gifhorn) (Note: "U23 schlägt Gifhorn 3:0" (in German). VfL Wolfsburg. 8 February 2009.)
--	DF	GER	Julian Klamt (from VfL Wolfsburg II)
--	FW	GER	Sebastian Polter (from VfL Wolfsburg II) (Note: "Profiverträge für fünf U23-Spieler, Altiparmak kommt von Hertha 03 Zehlendorf" (in German). VfL Wolfsburg. 5 June 2009.)
--	DF	GER	Michael Schulze (from VfL Wolfsburg II)
--	DF	GER	Daniel Riemer (from VfL Wolfsburg II)
--	FW	TUR	Burak Altıparmak (from FC Hertha 03 Zehlendorf Youth)

No.	Pos.	Nation	Player
2	DF	ITA	Cristian Zaccardo (to Parma F.C.)
8	FW	JPN	Yoshito Ōkubo (to Vissel Kobe) (Note: "Okubo kehrt zurück nach Japan" (in German). VfL Wolfsburg. 16 June 2009.)
11	FW	BRA	Caiuby (on loan to MSV Duisburg) (Note: Caiuby stürmt für den MSV)
15	MF	GER	Daniel Adlung (on loan to Alemannia Aachen)
16	FW	TUR	Mahir Sağlık (on loan to SC Paderborn, previously on loan at Karlsruher SC)
21	GK	GER	Patrick Platins (released)
28	FW	USA	Kamani Hill (to Vitória Guimarães)
29	FW	ROU	Sergiu Radu (to Energie Cottbus, previously on loan at 1. FC Köln) (Note: Sergiu Radu kehrt zurück!)
31	MF	GER	Alexander Laas (to VfL Wolfsburg II, previously on loan at Arminia Bielefeld) (Note: "Bielefeld will Trainersuche zügig vorantreiben" (in German). Financial Times Deutschland. 26 May 2009.)
37	MF	GER	Sergei Karimov (to VfL Wolfsburg II)
39	DF	POR	Alex (to Vitória Guimarães)
--	FW	ROU	Vlad Munteanu (to VfL Wolfsburg II, previously on loan at Arminia Bielefeld)
--	FW	NED	Rick Hoogendorp (to SVV Scheveningen, previously on loan at ADO Den Haag)
--	MF	GER	Christopher Lamprecht (to Holstein Kiel, previously on loan at 1. FC Kaiserslautern) (Note: "Fußball: Christopher Lamprecht wechselt von Kaiserslautern zu Holstein Kiel" (in German). ShortNews. 15 June 2009.)
--	MF	COD	Cedric Makiadi (to SC Freiburg, previously on loan at MSV Duisburg)

=== FC Bayern Munich ===
In:

No.	Pos.	Nation	Player
4	DF	NED	Edson Braafheid (from FC Twente)
10	MF	NED	Arjen Robben (from Real Madrid)
11	FW	CRO	Ivica Olic (from Hamburger SV)
13	DF	GER	Andreas Görlitz (loan return from Karlsruher SC)
19	MF	GER	Alexander Baumjohann (from Borussia Mönchengladbach)
23	MF	CRO	Danijel Pranjić (from SC Heerenveen)
25	FW	GER	Thomas Müller (from FC Bayern Munich II)
28	DF	GER	Holger Badstuber (from FC Bayern Munich II)
33	FW	GER	Mario Gómez (from VfB Stuttgart)
44	MF	UKR	Anatoliy Tymoschuk (from Zenit St. Petersburg)

Out:

No.	Pos.	Nation	Player
3	DF	BRA	Lúcio (to Inter Milan) (Note: Brasiliens Team-Kapitän wechselt zu Inter Mailand – Lucio verlässt den FC Bayern)
11	FW	GER	Lukas Podolski (to 1. FC Köln)
15	MF	BRA	Zé Roberto (to Hamburger SV)
23	DF	ITA	Massimo Oddo (loan return to AC Milan)
24	MF	GER	Tim Borowski (to SV Werder Bremen) (Note: "Zurück an die Weser" (in German). DFL. 22 July 2009.)
32	DF	GER	Mats Hummels (to Borussia Dortmund, previously on loan)
20	MF	ARG	Jose Sosa (on loan to Estudiantes LP)

=== VfB Stuttgart ===
In:

No.	Pos.	Nation	Player
22	MF	GER	Matthias Schwarz (from FC Ingolstadt) (Note: "VfB schlägt gleich doppelt zu" (in German). DFL. 25 June 2009.)
23	MF	BLR	Alexander Hleb (on loan from FC Barcelona) (Note: Hleb on loan to VfB Stuttgart)
27	DF	GER	Stefano Celozzi (from Karlsruher SC)
29	FW	RUS	Pavel Pogrebnyak (from FC Zenit St. Petersburg) (Note: "Der Wechsel von Pogrebnyak ist perfekt" (in German). VfB Stuttgart. 2 August 2009.)
32	MF	SRB	Zdravko Kuzmanovic (from AC Fiorentina)
39	FW	GER	Julian Schieber (from VfB Stuttgart II)

Out:

No.	Pos.	Nation	Player
29	MF	CMR	Georges Mandjeck (on loan to 1. FC Kaiserslautern)
33	FW	GER	Mario Gómez (to FC Bayern Munich)
38	FW	SRB	Danijel Ljuboja (to Grenoble Foot 38)

=== Hertha BSC ===
In:

No.	Pos.	Nation	Player
5	DF	SRB	Nemanja Pejčinović (on loan from FK Rad) (Note: "Hertha BSC holt Abwehrtalent" (in German). DFL. 24 July 2009.)
6	DF	GER	Christoph Janker (from TSG 1899 Hoffenheim)
9	FW	COL	Adrian Ramos (from América de Cali)
11	MF	GER	Florian Kringe (on loan from Borussia Dortmund)
12	GK	GER	Timo Ochs (from FC Red Bull Salzburg) (Note: [backPid]=18232&tx_ttnews[tt_news]=5964&cHash=30d0367cf7 Timo Ochs ist Herthaner)
18	FW	POL	Artur Wichniarek (from Arminia Bielefeld)
22	DF	SWE	Rasmus Bengtsson (from Trelleborgs FF)
27	MF	BRA	Cesar (from Al-Ahli)
31	MF	ALB	Fanol Perdedaj (from Hertha BSC youth)

Out:

No.	Pos.	Nation	Player
5	DF	GER	Sofian Chahed (to Hannover 96) (Note: Chahed der Zweite)
6	MF	CRO	Marko Babic (to Real Zaragoza) (Note: Real Zaragoza land Hertha Berlin defender Babic)
9	FW	SRB	Marko Pantelić (to AFC Ajax) (Note: International: Pantelic heuert bei Ajax an)
11	FW	UKR	Andriy Voronin (loan return to Liverpool F.C.) (Note: "Mit mir hätte Hertha die Champions League gepackt" (in German). BZ. 26 May 2009.)
12	GK	GER	Christian Fiedler (retired)
14	DF	CRO	Josip Simunic (to TSG 1899 Hoffenheim) (Note: "Kroatischer Nationalspieler für 1899" (in German). DFL. 30 June 2009.)
15	DF	BRA	Rodnei (on loan to 1. FC Kaiserslautern)
16	MF	BRA	Lúcio (on loan to Grêmio)
22	DF	ARG	Leandro Cufré (loan return to AS Monaco)
27	FW	TUN	Amine Chermiti (on loan to Al-Ittihad) (Note: Chermiti-Wechsel perfekt)
33	FW	BRA	André Lima (on loan to Botafogo, previously on loan at FC São Paulo)
38	FW	FRA	Ibrahima Traoré (to FC Augsburg) (Note: "FCA verpflichtet Bundesliga-Stürmer" (in German). DFL. 14 July 2009.)
39	MF	GER	Florian Riedel (to Hertha BSC II)

=== Hamburger SV ===
In:

No.	Pos.	Nation	Player
3	DF	CZE	David Rozehnal (from S.S. Lazio) (Note: Stareinkauf Rozehnal will mit dem HSV Titel holen)
8	MF	BRA	Zé Roberto (from FC Bayern Munich)
11	FW	NED	Eljero Elia (from FC Twente)
13	MF	GER	Robert Tesche (from Arminia Bielefeld)
16	FW	SWE	Marcus Berg (from FC Groningen)
19	FW	TUR	Tolgay Arslan (from Borussia Dortmund Youth)
24	MF	GER	Christian Groß (from Hamburger SV II)
34	DF	GER	Kai-Fabian Schulz (from Hamburger SV II)

Out:

No.	Pos.	Nation	Player
3	DF	CMR	Thimothée Atouba (to AFC Ajax) (Note: Ajax contracteert Thimothée Atouba)
8	MF	GER	Albert Streit (loan return to FC Schalke)
11	FW	CRO	Ivica Olic (to FC Bayern Munich)
16	DF	DEN	Michael Gravgaard (loan return to FC Nantes) (Note: "Der HSV trennt sich von vier Leihgaben" (in German). DFL. 2 June 2009.)
17	FW	NGA	Macauley Chrisantus (on loan to Karlsruher SC)
22	FW	GER	Eric Maxim Choupo-Moting (on loan to 1. FC Nürnberg) (Note: Choupo-Moting bis Saisonende beim 1. FCN)
24	MF	CMR	Marcel Ndjeng (loan return to Borussia Mönchengladbach)
29	GK	GER	Raphael Wolf (to Kapfenberger SV)
32	MF	GER	Änis Ben-Hatira (on loan to MSV Duisburg, previously on loan)
33	GK	MAR	Khalid Sinouh (released)
--	GK	GER	Sascha Kirschstein (to Rot Weiss Ahlen, previously on loan at SpVgg Greuther Fürth)
--	FW	GER	Rouwen Hennings (to FC St. Pauli, previously on loan)
--	MF	GER	Sidney Sam (on loan to 1. FC Kaiserslautern, previously on loan)

=== Borussia Dortmund ===
In:

No.	Pos.	Nation	Player
11	FW	BUL	Dimitar Rangelov (from FC Energie Cottbus) (Note: "Rangelov wird Dortmunder Borusse" (in German). DFL. 16 June 2009.)
13	FW	FRA	Damien Le Tallec (from Stade Rennais F.C.)
14	MF	GER	Markus Feulner (from 1. FSV Mainz 05)
15	DF	GER	Mats Hummels (from FC Bayern Munich, previously on loan)
18	FW	ARG	Lucas Barrios (from Colo-Colo) (Note: BVB verpflichtet Barrios)
19	FW	GER	Kevin Großkreutz (from Rot Weiss Ahlen) (Note: "Kevin Großkreutz signs with BVB". goal.com. 25 January 2009.)
22	MF	GER	Sven Bender (from TSV 1860 Munich)
23	FW	GER	Christopher Kullmann (from Borussia Dortmund II) (Note: "Auch Schmelzer hilft im Gipfeltreffen" (in German). Der Westen. 24 April 2009.)
36	MF	TUR	Yasin Öztekin (from Borussia Dortmund II)
40	GK	GER	Marcel Höttecke (from Borussia Dortmund II)

Out:

No.	Pos.	Nation	Player
3	DF	KOR	Young-Pyo Lee (to Al-Hilal)
6	MF	GER	Florian Kringe (on loan to Hertha BSC)
13	FW	SUI	Alexander Frei (to FC Basel)
14	DF	SRB	Antonio Rukavina (to TSV 1860 Munich, previously on loan)
22	MF	GER	Kevin-Prince Boateng (loan return to Tottenham Hotspurs)
32	DF	GER	Markus Brzenska (to Energie Cottbus, previously on loan at MSV Duisburg)
--	MF	ITA	Giovanni Federico (to Arminia Bielefeld, previously on loan at Karlsruher SC)

=== TSG 1899 Hoffenheim ===
In:

No.	Pos.	Nation	Player
7	MF	BRA	Maicosuel (from Botafogo)
8	DF	GER	Christian Eichner (from Karlsruher SC)
11	FW	GER	Marco Terrazzino (from TSG 1899 Hoffenheim Youth)
14	DF	CRO	Josip Simunic (from Hertha BSC)
18	FW	GHA	Prince Tagoe (from Al-Ettifaq) (Note: "Neuer Stürmer für Hoffenheim" (in German). DFL. 9 June 2009.)
22	MF	FIN	Jukka Raitala (on loan from HJK Helsinki) (Note: 1899 Hoffenheim leiht finnischen U21-Nationalspieler Raitala aus)
30	GK	GER	Jens Grahl (from SpVgg Greuther Fürth)
36	MF	ARG	Franco Zuculini (from Racing Club de Avellaneda)
42	DF	NGA	Albert Alex (from 1. FC Köln Youth)

Out:

No.	Pos.	Nation	Player
6	DF	BRA	Fabricio (loan return to Clube de Regatas do Flamengo) (Note: "Hoffenheim trennt sich von Janker und Fabricio" (in German). Financial Times Deutschland. 23 May 2009.)
10	MF	GER	Selim Teber (to Eintracht Frankfurt) (Note: "Selim Teber zieht es zur Eintracht" (in German). DFL. 30 June 2009.)
12	FW	BRA	Wellington (on loan to FC Twente) (Note: Wellington auf Leihbasis nach Enschede)
14	DF	GER	Christoph Janker (to Hertha BSC)
18	FW	CIV	Boubacar Sanogo (loan return to Werder Bremen)
29	GK	GER	Daniel Bernhardt (to VfR Aalen)
37	MF	GER	Jonas Strifler (to Dynamo Dresden) (Note: Jonas Strifler verlässt 1899 Hoffenheim in Richtung Dresden)
--	MF	GER	Steffen Haas (to Kickers Offenbach, previously on loan)

=== FC Schalke 04 ===
In:

No.	Pos.	Nation	Player
7	FW	GER	Lewis Holtby (from Alemannia Aachen) (Note: "Holtby trägt ab sofort "Königsblau"" (in German). DFL. 7 July 2009.)
8	MF	BRA	Mineiro (from Chelsea F.C.)
15	MF	BRA	Zé Roberto (loan return from Clube de Regatas do Flamengo)
16	MF	CZE	Jan Morávek (from Bohemians 1905)
20	MF	GRE	Vasileios Pliatsikas (from AEK Athens)
21	MF	GER	Lukas Schmitz (from VfL Bochum II)
23	MF	TUR	Emin Yalın (from 1. FC Nürnberg II)
28	MF	GER	Christoph Moritz (from Alemannia Aachen II)
29	DF	SVK	Ľuboš Hanzel (on loan from FC Spartak Trnava)
31	FW	GER	David Loheider (from FC Schalke 04 Youth) (Note: Rückennummern für Neuzugänge zugeteilt)
32	DF	GER	Joel Matip (from FC Schalke 04 Youth)
39	DF	GER	Marvin Pachan (from FC Schalke 04 Youth)
40	MF	SRB	Predrag Stevanović (from FC Schalke 04 Youth)

Out:

No.	Pos.	Nation	Player
6	MF	GER	Albert Streit (to FC Schalke 04 II, previously on loan at Hamburger SV) (Note: Magath begnadigt Albert Streit)
20	DF	SRB	Mladen Krstajić (to FK Partizan)
21	MF	URU	Carlos Grossmüller (on loan to Danubio F.C.)
32	GK	GER	Ralf Fährmann (to Eintracht Frankfurt)
37	MF	NED	Orlando Engelaar (to PSV Eindhoven)
41	FW	GER	Marvin Pourie (on loan to TSV 1860 Munich, previously on loan) (Note: Pourie muss bleiben)

=== Bayer 04 Leverkusen ===
In:

No.	Pos.	Nation	Player
2	DF	GER	Daniel Schwaab (from SC Freiburg)
3	DF	GER	Stefan Reinartz (loan return from 1. FC Nürnberg)
4	DF	FIN	Sami Hyypiä (from Liverpool F.C.)
8	MF	GER	Lars Bender (from TSV 1860 Munich) (Note: Lars Bender wechselt zu Bayer 04)
19	FW	SUI	Eren Derdiyok (from FC Basel)
25	DF	TOG	Assimiou Touré (loan return from VfL Osnabrück)
28	MF	TUR	Burak Kaplan (from Bayer 04 Leverkusen Youth) (Note: Burak Kaplan unterschreibt Vertrag bis 2012)
29	FW	GRE	Theofanis Gekas (loan return from Portsmouth FC)
33	MF	GER	Pierre de Wit (loan return from VfL Osnabrück)
36	GK	GER	Fabian Giefer (from Bayer 04 Leverkusen II)
--	GK	POL	Tomasz Bobel (from Neftchi Baku PFC) (Note: Bayer 04 nimmt Torhüter Tomasz Bobel unter Vertrag)
--	FW	TUR	Tevfik Köse (loan return from Kayserispor)

Out:

No.	Pos.	Nation	Player
2	DF	TUN	Karim Haggui (to Hannover 96) (Note: "Ein Tunesier verstärkt 96" (in German). DFL. 1 June 2009.)
3	DF	BRA	Henrique (loan return to FC Barcelona)
14	MF	GER	Sascha Dum (on loan to Energie Cottbus) (Note: Sascha Dum verstärkt FC Energie)
16	MF	SUI	Pirmin Schwegler (to Eintracht Frankfurt) (Note: Schwegler geht zur Eintracht)
17	DF	SVK	Vratislav Gresko (released)
18	DF	CIV	Constant Djakpa (on loan to Hannover 96)
21	GK	HUN	Gabor Kiraly (loan return to Burnley FC)
25	MF	GER	Bernd Schneider (retired) (Note: Bernd Schneider bittet Bayer 04 um Vertragsauflösung)
29	FW	GRE	Angelos Charisteas (loan return to 1. FC Nürnberg)
34	GK	GER	Erik Domaschke (to SV Wehen Wiesbaden) (Note: "Erik Domaschke kommt zum SV Wehen Wiesbaden" (in German). SV Wehen Wiesbaden. 29 May 2009.)
--	DF	BRA	Anderson (to Fortuna Düsseldorf, previously on loan at VfL Osnabrück) (Note: "Eine große Aufgabe für Norbert Meier" (in German). Der Westen. 29 June 2009.)

=== Werder Bremen ===
In:

No.	Pos.	Nation	Player
6	MF	GER	Tim Borowski (from FC Bayern Munich)
10	MF	GER	Marko Marin (from Borussia Mönchengladbach) (Note: "Marin-Wechsel zu Werder Bremen perfekt" (in German). Main-Spitze. 24 June 2009.)
17	MF	BIH	Said Husejinovic (loan return from 1. FC Kaiserslautern)
24	FW	PER	Claudio Pizarro (from Chelsea F.C., previously on loan) (Note: Claudio Pizarro stürmt weiter für Werder Bremen)
32	MF	GER	José-Alex Ikeng (from Werder Bremen II)
39	FW	BOL	Marcelo Moreno (on loan from Shakhtar Donetsk) (Note: "UEFA-Cup-Sieger wechselt nach Bremen" (in German). DFL. 29 May 2009.)
41	DF	GER	Dominik Schmidt (from Werder Bremen II)
45	MF	GER	Timo Perthel (from Werder Bremen II) (Note: "Perthel: neuer Vertrag, neue Wohnung, neuer Arbeitsplatz" (in German). Kreiszeitung. 5 May 2009.)
47	FW	GER	Torsten Oehrl (from Werder Bremen II)

Out:

No.	Pos.	Nation	Player
6	MF	GER	Frank Baumann (retired)
10	MF	BRA	Diego (to Juventus FC)
16	MF	GRE	Alexandros Tziolis (loan return to Panathinaikos) (Note: "Option nicht gezogen: Tziolis in der Warteschleife" (in German). Kreiszeitung. 27 May 2009.)
18	FW	CIV	Boubacar Sanogo (to AS Saint-Étienne, previously on loan at TSG 1899 Hoffenheim) (Note: Werders Sanogo wechselt zu St. Etienne)
19	MF	BRA	Carlos Alberto (on loan to CR Vasco da Gama, previously on loan)
34	FW	AUT	Martin Harnik (on loan to Fortuna Düsseldorf)
35	FW	COL	John Mosquera (on loan to 1. FC Union Berlin, previously on loan at SønderjyskE) (Note: Werder verleiht Mosquera an Union Berlin)
40	GK	GER	Nico Pellatz (to Apollon Limassol) (Note: "Pellatz zieht′s nach Zypern" (in German). Werder Bremen. 18 June 2009.)
--	FW	GER	Kevin Schindler (on loan to FC Augsburg, previously on loan at FC Hansa Rostock)

=== Hannover 96 ===
In:

No.	Pos.	Nation	Player
11	FW	CIV	Didier Konan Ya (from Rosenborg BK)
15	DF	CIV	Constant Djakpa (on loan from Bayer 04 Leverkusen)
21	DF	TUN	Karim Haggui (from Bayer 04 Leverkusen)
22	MF	GER	Valdet Rama (from FC Ingolstadt)
23	DF	GER	Sofian Chahed (from Hertha BSC)
35	MF	GER	Sofien Chahed (from Hannover 96 II)

Out:

No.	Pos.	Nation	Player
17	MF	FRA	Gaëtan Krebs (to Karlsruher SC)
18	MF	GER	Michael Tarnat (retired)
22	DF	GER	Frank Fahrenhorst (to MSV Duisburg)
23	MF	BUL	Chavdar Yankov (on loan to MSV Duisburg)
25	DF	FRA	Valerien Ismael (retired)
35	MF	GER	Bastian Schulz (to 1. FC Kaiserslautern) (Note: "FCK holt Bastian Schulz" (in German). DFL. 20 June 2009.)

=== 1. FC Köln ===
In:

No.	Pos.	Nation	Player
7	FW	GER	Sebastian Freis (from Karlsruher SC)
10	FW	GER	Lukas Podolski (from FC Bayern Munich)
12	MF	POR	Maniche (from Atlético Madrid) (Note: ""Geißböcke" vor Transfercoup" (in German). DFL. 19 July 2009.)
16	DF	GER	Christopher Schorch (from Real Madrid Castilla) (Note: [backPid]=2327&cHash=753f3f4833 FC verpflichtet Christopher Schorch – Wechsel perfekt!)
24	FW	ANG	José Pierre Vunguidica (from 1. FC Köln Youth)
26	MF	GER	Lukas Nottbeck (from 1. FC Köln Youth)
27	MF	GER	Christian Clemens (from 1. FC Köln Youth)
29	FW	GER	Sebastian Zielinsky (from 1. FC Köln Youth)
32	DF	GER	Stephan Salger (from 1. FC Köln Youth)
34	GK	CRO	Miro Varvodić (on loan from Hajduk Split, previously on loan) (Note: "Trainingslager-Personalien" (in German). 1. FC Köln. 13 July 2009.)

Out:

No.	Pos.	Nation	Player
5	DF	TUR	Ümit Özat (retired)
7	FW	SRB	Nemanja Vučićević (to Hapoel Tel Aviv) (Note: Vucicevic: Nicht zu den Löwen)
8	FW	GER	Matthias Scherz (retired)
10	MF	GER	Thomas Broich (to 1. FC Nürnberg)
24	FW	ROU	Sergiu Radu (loan return to VfL Wolfsburg)
26	MF	GHA	Derek Boateng (to Getafe FC) (Note: Definitiv! Boateng wechselt nach Spanien)

=== Eintracht Frankfurt ===
In:

No.	Pos.	Nation	Player
4	DF	GER	Maik Franz (from Karlsruher SC)
6	MF	GER	Selim Teber (from TSG 1899 Hoffenheim)
22	GK	GER	Ralf Fährmann (from Schalke 04)
24	DF	GER	Sebastian Jung (from Eintracht Frankfurt Youth)
25	FW	GER	Marcel Heller (loan return from MSV Duisburg)
27	MF	SUI	Pirmin Schwegler (from Bayer 04 Leverkusen)
34	FW	GER	Cenk Tosun (from Eintracht Frankfurt Youth) (Note: "Verletztenmisere Kein Fenin-Ersatz in Sicht" (in German). Hessischer Rundfunk. 25 June 2009.)
35	FW	GER	Marcos Alvarez (from Eintracht Frankfurt Youth)
--	GK	GER	Markus Kolke (from Eintracht Frankfurt II)
--	GK	BIH	Erman Muratagic (from Eintracht Frankfurt Youth) (Note: Keine Torwartverpflichtung bei Eintracht Frankfurt)

Out:

No.	Pos.	Nation	Player
6	MF	GER	Michael Fink (to Beşiktaş)
9	FW	CMR	Leonard Kweuke (loan return to DAC Dunajská Streda)
19	DF	FRA	Habib Bellaïd (on loan to Racing Strasbourg)
20	MF	JPN	Junichi Inamoto (to Stade Rennais) (Note: "Inamoto wechselt zu Stade Rennes" (in German). DFL. 19 June 2009.)
22	MF	CRO	Krešo Ljubičić (to Hajduk Split)
27	DF	GER	Alexander Krük (on loan to VfL Osnabrück) (Note: Osnabrück leiht sich Frankfurter Krük aus)

=== VfL Bochum ===
In:

No.	Pos.	Nation	Player
8	MF	SWE	Andreas Johansson (from Halmstads BK) (Note: "Ein klassischer Sechser für den VfL" (in German). DFL. 23 June 2009.)
11	FW	SVN	Zlatko Dedič (from Frosinone Calcio) (Note: Zlatko Dedic geht für den VfL Bochum auf Torejagd)
26	GK	GER	Andreas Luthe (from VfL Bochum II)
27	MF	GER	Kevin Vogt (from VfL Bochum Youth)
30	DF	GER	Patrick Fabian (from VfL Bochum II)

Out:

No.	Pos.	Nation	Player
11	FW	POL	Marcin Mięciel (to Legia Warszawa) (Note: Mieciel wechselt zu Legia Warschau)
17	FW	TUR	Sinan Kaloğlu (to Vitesse Arnhem)
18	MF	GER	Oliver Schröder (to FC Hansa Rostock)
26	MF	GER	Heinrich Schmidtgal (to Rot-Weiss Oberhausen) (Note: "Schmidtgal ist ein "Kleeblatt"" (in German). DFL. 8 June 2009.)
27	GK	GER	Andreas Lengsfeld (released)
28	MF	GER	David Zajas (to SSVg Velbert) (Note: "SSVg verzichtet auf den großen Umbau" (in German). Der Westen. 24 June 2009.)
29	FW	TUR	Dilaver Güçlü (to Manisaspor) (Note: Kemal Okyay ve Dilaver Guclu Maisaspor)
--	MF	CRO	Ivo Iličević (on loan to 1. FC Kaiserslautern, previously on loan at SpVgg Greuther Fürth)
--	MF	GER	Danny Fuchs (to 1. FC Kaiserslautern, previously on loan) (Note: "FCK verpflichtet Fuchs" (in German). DFL. 26 June 2009.)

=== Borussia Mönchengladbach ===
In:

No.	Pos.	Nation	Player
8	MF	NED	Marcel Meeuwis (from Roda JC)
10	FW	ARG	Raúl Bobadilla (from Grasshoppers Zürich)
11	MF	GER	Marco Reus (from Rot Weiss Ahlen)
13	MF	GER	Roman Neustädter (from 1. FSV Mainz 05)
14	MF	GER	Thorben Marx (from Arminia Bielefeld)
18	MF	VEN	Juan Arango (from RCD Mallorca) (Note: Arango ya es jugador del Borussia M'Gladbach (Arango a Borussia M'Gladbach player); Diario Marca, 27 June 2009 (in Spanish))
24	MF	GER	Tony Jantschke (from Borussia Mönchengladbach Youth)
28	DF	GER	Tim Heubach (from Borussia Mönchengladbach II)
29	FW	GER	Fabian Bäcker (from Borussia Mönchengladbach Youth)
--	MF	DEN	Sebastian Svärd (loan return from FC Hansa Rostock)
--	GK	GER	Marc-André ter Stegen (from Borussia Mönchengladbach Youth)

Out:

No.	Pos.	Nation	Player
2	DF	GER	Sebastian Schachten (on loan to SC Paderborn 07)
5	DF	CIV	Steve Gohouri (released)
7	MF	MLI	Soumaila Coulibaly (to FSV Frankfurt)
8	MF	CZE	Tomas Galásek (to FSV Erlangen-Bruck) (Note: Galasek setzt Karriere wohl doch fort)
11	MF	GER	Marko Marin (to SV Werder Bremen)
14	FW	SWE	Sharbel Touma (to Iraklis)
17	MF	NED	Patrick Paauwe (to VVV-Venlo) (Note: Paauwe unterschreibt in Venlo)
28	MF	GER	Johannes van den Bergh (to Fortuna Düsseldorf)
29	MF	GER	Alexander Baumjohann (to FC Bayern Munich)
--	MF	CMR	Marcel Ndjeng (to FC Augsburg, previously on loan at Hamburger SV) (Note: "FCA verpflichtet Marcel Ndjeng" (in German). DFL. 28 June 2009.)

=== SC Freiburg ===
In:

No.	Pos.	Nation	Player
3	MF	GER	Felix Bastians (from BSC Young Boys)
6	FW	KOR	Cha Du-Ri (from TuS Koblenz)
7	MF	COD	Cedric Makiadi (from VfL Wolfsburg, previously on loan at MSV Duisburg)
24	MF	CRO	Mensur Mujdža (from NK Zagreb)
26	GK	GER	Manuel Salz (from Stuttgarter Kickers)
27	FW	GER	Stefan Reisinger (from SpVgg Greuther Fürth) (Note: "Freiburg Angelt sich "Kleeblat"-Stürmer" (in German). DFL. 15 April 2009.)
37	GK	GER	Oliver Baumann (from SC Freiburg Youth)

Out:

No.	Pos.	Nation	Player
7	DF	TUR	Ali Güneş (to Kasımpaşa) (Note: Freiburger Günes wechselt in die Türkei)
9	FW	BLR	Vitali Rodionov (loan return to FC BATE Borisov)
14	MF	GER	Kevin Schlitte (to FC Hansa Rostock)
27	MF	GER	Maximilian Mehring (released)
30	MF	GEO	David Targamadze (on loan to FC Aarau)
36	DF	GER	Daniel Schwaab (to Bayer 04 Leverkusen)
39	GK	GER	Michael Müller (on loan to 1. FC Saarbrücken)
--	MF	GER	Manuel Konrad (to SpVgg Unterhaching, previously on loan)

=== 1. FSV Mainz 05 ===
In:

No.	Pos.	Nation	Player
7	MF	GER	Eugen Polanski (from Getafe CF) (Note: "Amateur" Grimaldi fährt mit nach Bochum – Polanski unterschreibt)
11	MF	CZE	Filip Trojan (from FC St. Pauli)
14	FW	GER	André Schürrle (from 1. FSV Mainz 05 Youth)
15	DF	GER	Jan Kirchhoff (from 1. FSV Mainz 05 Youth)
25	MF	AUT	Andreas Ivanschitz (from Panathinaikos F.C.)
28	FW	EGY	Gamal Hamza (from El Zamalek)
30	GK	GER	Pierre Kleinheider (from 1. FSV Mainz 05 II) (Note: "Vierter 05-Zugang zu 99 Prozent perfekt – Interesse an Vucicevic?" (in German). Wiesbadener Kurier. 19 June 2009.)
33	GK	GER	Heinz Müller (from Barnsley F.C.) (Note: "Mainz holt Torhüter aus England" (in German). DFL. 15 June 2009.)

Out:

No.	Pos.	Nation	Player
5	DF	GER	Christian Demirtas (to Karlsruher SC)
7	MF	GER	Markus Feulner (to Borussia Dortmund)
11	MF	RSA	Delron Buckley (to Anorthosis Famagusta) (Note: Buckley to Cyprus)
14	DF	GER	Robert Fleßers (to FC Ingolstadt) (Note: "Köppel bleibt – neuer Defensivspieler kommt" (in German). DFL. 22 May 2009.)
15	MF	GER	Roman Neustädter (to Borussia Mönchengladbach)
25	MF	GER	Mario Vrančić (on loan to Rot Weiss Ahlen)
28	FW	EGY	Gamal Hamza (released) (Note: Mainz 05 löst Vertrag mit Gamal Hamza auf)
30	GK	GER	Daniel Ischdonat (released)

=== 1. FC Nürnberg ===
In:

No.	Pos.	Nation	Player
4	DF	NOR	Havard Nordtveit (on loan from Arsenal F.C., previously on loan at Lillestrøm SK) (Note: Havard Nordtveit kommt zum Club)
9	FW	GRE	Angelos Charisteas (loan return from Bayer 04 Leverkusen)
14	FW	GER	Eric Maxim Choupo-Moting (on loan from Hamburger SV)
26	MF	GER	Thomas Broich (from 1. FC Köln)
31	DF	POL	Tomasz Welnicki (from VfL Bochum Youth)
33	FW	TUR	Güngör Kaya (from VfL Bochum Youth)
35	MF	GER	Jonatan Kotzke (from 1. FC Nürnberg II)
38	MF	GER	Manuel Stiefler (from 1. FC Nürnberg II)

Out:

No.	Pos.	Nation	Player
3	DF	GER	Stefan Reinartz (loan return to Bayer 04 Leverkusen)
4	DF	POR	José Gonçalves (loan return to Heart of Midlothian)
6	DF	MKD	Aleksandar Mitreski (to FC Sion)
28	DF	GER	Dominik Reinhardt (on loan to FC Augsburg) (Note: Reinhardt nach Augsburg)
--	MF	SVK	Mário Breška (to APOEL, previously on loan at Enosis Paralimni)

== 2. Bundesliga ==
=== Energie Cottbus ===
In:

No.	Pos.	Nation	Player
1	GK	CAN	Lars Hirschfeld (from CFR Cluj) (Note: "Cottbus holt kanadischen Nationaltorhüter" (in German). DFL. 26 June 2009.)
3	DF	UKR	Valeriy Sokolenko (from Polonia Bytom)
5	MF	GER	Sascha Dum (on loan from Bayer 04 Leverkusen)
8	MF	BRA	Roger (from Figueirense) (Note: "Brasilianer für die Energie-Zentrale" (in German). DFL. 30 June 2009.)
11	FW	CMR	Leonard Kweuke (on loan from DAC Dunajská Streda, previously on loan at Eintracht Frankfurt)
13	MF	GER	Julian Börner (from Rot-Weiss Erfurt Youth) (Note: Julian Börner wechselt nach Cottbus)
14	FW	ROU	Sergiu Radu (from VfL Wolfsburg, previously on loan at 1. FC Köln)
18	MF	GER	Marc-André Kruska (from Club Brugge)Dimo Nadeem
24	DF	MKD	Igor Mitreski (loan return from Germinal Beerschot)
25	DF	GER	Markus Brzenska (from Borussia Dortmund, previously on loan at MSV Duisburg)
34	GK	GER	Frank Lehmann (on loan from VfB Stuttgart II, previously on loan at Eintracht Frankfurt II) (Note: "Lehmann von Stuttgart nach Cottbus" (in German). DFL. 23 June 2009.)
37	MF	GER	Nils Miatke (from Energie Cottbus Youth) (Note: FC Energie vertraut Nils Miatke: Talent unterschreibt Vertrag bis 2011)
38	DF	CAN	Adam Straith (from Vancouver Whitecaps Residency, previously on loan) (Note: Adam Straith transferred to Energie Cottbus)

Out:

No.	Pos.	Nation	Player
5	DF	POL	Mariusz Kukiełka (to Skoda Xanthi) (Note: Mariusz Kukielka wechselt nach Xanthi)
8	FW	BUL	Dimitar Rangelov (to Borussia Dortmund)
11	MF	SRB	Ivica Iliev (released)
12	GK	GER	Phillip Pentke (released) (Note: "Cottbuser Torwart-Suche geht weiter" (in German). Rundfunk Berlin-Brandenburg. 23 June 2009.)
13	MF	ALB	Ervin Skela (to TuS Koblenz) (Note: Perfekt! Ervin Skela unterschreibt Dreijahresvertrag bei der TUS)
14	DF	SRB	Dusan Vasiljevic (released) (Note: Vertrag mit Dusan Vasiljevic aufgelöst)
21	DF	MNE	Savo Pavićević (to Kavala) (Note: Savo Pavicevic verlässt FC Energie)
22	FW	GER	Danny Galm (to 1. FC Kaiserslautern II, previously on loan at Stuttgarter Kickers) (Note: Heun und Galm schließen die Lücke)
23	GK	BIH	Tomislav Piplica (retired) (Note: Umbruch geht weiter: Energie leiht Torwart Lehmann aus – Piplica wird Talentetrainer)
25	DF	CZE	Jan Rajnoch (loan return to FK Mladá Boleslav)
28	DF	BIH	Ivan Radeljić (to Gençlerbirliği S.K.) (Note: Radeljic zu Gençlerbirligi)
30	FW	SRB	Branko Jelic (to Perth Glory)
31	MF	GER	Michael Lerchl (to RB Leipzig) (Note: RB Leipzig verpflichtet Profis Lerchl und Höfler)
33	DF	CRO	Mario Cvitanovic (released) (Note: "Cottbus-Duo freigestellt" (in German). DFL. 30 June 2009.)
35	DF	TUR	Çağdaş Atan (to FC Basel)
37	MF	GER	Christian Müller (to TuS Koblenz) (Note: TuS verpflichtet Christian Müller von Energie Cottbus)

=== Karlsruher SC ===
In:

No.	Pos.	Nation	Player
5	DF	GER	Christian Demirtas (from 1. FSV Mainz 05)
11	DF	GER	Andreas Schäfer (from VfL Osnabrück)
14	FW	GER	Anton Fink (from SpVgg Unterhaching) (Note: Haching verliert Fink – und kriegt viel Geld)
18	FW	NGA	Macauley Chrisantus (on loan from Hamburger SV)
19	FW	TUR	Serhat Akın (from Konyaspor)
21	MF	FRA	Gaëtan Krebs (from Hannover 96)
23	DF	GER	Matthias Langkamp (from Panionios F.C.) (Note: Karlsruher Sport Club : Matthias Langkamp zum KSC)
29	GK	GER	Kristian Nicht (from Viking FK) (Note: "Neuer Torhüter für den Karlsruher SC" (in German). DFL. 13 July 2009.)
30	FW	FIN	Niklas Tarvajärvi (from Neuchâtel Xamax)
33	DF	CRO	Dino Drpic (from Dinamo Zagreb, previously on loan) (Note: "Drpic spielt weiter für den KSC – Vertrag unterzeichnet" (in German). KA-News. 6 August 2009.)

Out:

No.	Pos.	Nation	Player
3	DF	GER	Maik Franz (to Eintracht Frankfurt)
5	DF	GER	Tim Sebastian (to FC Hansa Rostock)
6	DF	RSA	Bradley Carnell (to FC Hansa Rostock)
9	FW	ALB	Edmond Kapllani (to FC Augsburg) (Note: "Vierter Neuzugang für den FCA" (in German). DFL. 27 May 2009.)
16	DF	GER	Martin Stoll (to FC Aarau)
17	FW	AUS	Joshua Kennedy (to Nagoya Grampus)
18	FW	GER	Sebastian Freis (to 1. FC Köln)
19	DF	GER	Stefan Buck (to FC Augsburg) (Note: FCA verpflichtet Stefan Buck)
21	DF	GER	Christian Eichner (to TSG 1899 Hoffenheim)
23	FW	TUR	Mahir Sağlık (loan return to VfL Wolfsburg)
25	MF	BRA	Antônio da Silva (on loan to FC Basel)
26	MF	ITA	Giovanni Federico (loan return to Borussia Dortmund)
27	DF	GER	Stefano Celozzi (to VfB Stuttgart)
29	GK	GER	Thomas Unger (to Alemannia Aachen)
77	DF	GER	Andreas Görlitz (loan return to FC Bayern Munich)

=== Arminia Bielefeld ===
In:

No.	Pos.	Nation	Player
6	DF	GER	Nils Fischer (loan return from Wuppertaler SV Borussia) (Note: "Fischer kehrt zur Arminia zurück" (in German). DFL. 29 May 2009.)
7	MF	DEN	Kasper Risgård (from Aalborg BK)
8	MF	ITA	Giovanni Federico (from Borussia Dortmund, previously on loan at Karlsruher SC)
9	FW	CZE	Pavel Fort (from FC Toulouse)
18	FW	ALB	Besart Berisha (from Burnley FC)
19	MF	GER	Michael Delura (from Panionios F.C.)
27	MF	GER	Arne Feick (from FC Erzgebirge Aue)
29	MF	CIV	Did'dy Guela (from AEL)

Out:

No.	Pos.	Nation	Player
4	DF	GER	Nico Herzig (to Alemannia Aachen) (Note: Nico Herzig ist wieder da!)
7	MF	GER	Thorben Marx (to Borussia Mönchengladbach)
8	DF	GER	Tobias Rau (retired)
11	FW	FIN	Berat Sadik (on loan to S.V. Zulte Waregem)
18	FW	POL	Artur Wichniarek (to Hertha BSC)
19	MF	GER	Alexander Laas (loan return to VfL Wolfsburg)
27	FW	GRE	Leonidas Kampantais (to Olympiacos Volos) (Note: Και ο Καμπάνταης ... στη "μηχανή" για την άνοδο...)
28	GK	GER	Daniel Riemer (to Preußen Münster)
30	FW	ROU	Vlad Munteanu (loan return to VfL Wolfsburg)
32	MF	GER	Robert Tesche (to Hamburger SV)
38	GK	GER	Alexander Bade (retired) (Note: Bade wird Torwarttrainer beim 1. FC Köln)

=== Alemannia Aachen ===
In:

No.	Pos.	Nation	Player
2	DF	GER	Nico Herzig (from Arminia Bielefeld)
10	MF	GER	Thorsten Burkhardt (from SpVgg Greuther Fürth)
12	MF	TUN	Aïmen Demai (from 1. FC Kaiserslautern)
13	GK	GER	Thomas Unger (from Karlsruher SC)
14	FW	SEN	Babacar Gueye (from FC Metz)
15	MF	GER	Kevin Kratz (from Bayer 04 Leverkusen II)
24	MF	GER	Daniel Adlung (on loan from VfL Wolfsburg)
25	FW	GER	Manuel Junglas (from Alemannia Aachen II)
33	MF	TUR	Abdulkadir Özgen (from Alemannia Aachen II)

Out:

No.	Pos.	Nation	Player
1	GK	GER	Stephan Straub (retired)
4	DF	CRO	Hrvoje Vuković (released)
5	MF	FIN	Pekka Lagerblom (to FSV Frankfurt)
14	MF	GER	Daniel Brinkmann (to FC Augsburg) (Note: "Daniel Brinkmann verstärkt FCA" (in German). FC Augsburg. 4 June 2009.)
18	FW	GER	Lewis Holtby (to FC Schalke 04)
20	MF	GER	Matthias Lehmann (to FC St. Pauli) (Note: "Vierter Neuzugang perfekt" (in German). DFL. 11 June 2009.)
29	MF	GER	Jochen Seitz (to Chernomorets Burgas) (Note: "Transfer-Kracher Seitz und Höfler in Interview" (in German). Aschaffenburg 24. 4 July 2009.)

=== SpVgg Greuther Fürth ===
In:

No.	Pos.	Nation	Player
6	DF	GER	Kim Falkenberg (from Rot-Weiß Oberhausen) (Note: "SpVgg verpflichtet Kim Falkenberg" (in German). SpVgg Greuther Fürth. 6 April 2009.)
8	MF	GER	Stephan Fürstner (from FC Bayern Munich II) (Note: "Bayern-Talent wechselt zu Greuther Fürth" (in German). DFL. 5 June 2009.)
9	FW	GER	Christopher Nöthe (on loan from Borussia Dortmund II, previously on loan at Rot-Weiss Oberhausen) (Note: "Nöthe tauscht das "Kleeblatt"" (in German). DFL. 11 June 2009.)
11	FW	GER	Dani Schahin (from Hamburger SV II)
13	DF	BIH	Mirko Hrgovic (from Dynamo Zagreb) (Note: "Fürth verstärkt die Defensive" (in German). DFL. 17 July 2009.)
14	MF	RUS	Edgar Prib (from SpVgg Greuther Fürth II)
15	GK	BIH	Jasmin Fejzić (loan return from Eintracht Braunschweig)
16	MF	MAR	Youssef Mokhtari (from FSV Frankfurt) (Note: "Zu- und Abgang bei Greuther Fürth" (in German). DFL. 10 June 2009.)
21	FW	IRN	Sebastian Ghasemi-Nobakht (from VfB Oldenburg) (Note: Sebastian Ghasemi-Nobakht ein Kleeblättler)
23	FW	GER	Marco Sailer (from VfR Aalen) (Note: "Sturmtalent unterzeichnet beim "Kleeblatt"" (in German). DFL. 12 June 2009.)
25	MF	BIH	Ante Serdarušić (from HŠK Zrinjski Mostar) (Note: Serdarusic wird Franke)
26	GK	GER	Max Grün (from FC Bayern Munich II) (Note: Fürth verpflichtet Torhüter Grün von Bayern II)
27	MF	GER	Nicolai Müller (loan return from SV Sandhausen)

Out:

No.	Pos.	Nation	Player
2	DF	KOS	Shqipran Skeraj (loan return to KF Prishtina)
9	MF	CRO	Ivo Iličević (loan return to VfL Bochum)
10	MF	GER	Thorsten Burkhardt (to Alemannia Aachen)
11	FW	GER	Stefan Reisinger (to SC Freiburg)
13	MF	GER	Charles Takyi (to FC St. Pauli)
13	MF	GER	Alexander Voigt (to FSV Frankfurt)
15	MF	GER	Daniel Felgenhauer (to Rot Weiss Ahlen)
19	FW	GER	Aleksandar Kotuljac (to VfL Osnabrück)
23	DF	GER	Philipp Langen (on loan to TuS Koblenz) (Note: "Langen soll Spielpraxis sammeln" (in German). DFL. 19 June 2009.)
24	GK	GER	Jens Grahl (to TSG 1899 Hoffenheim)
27	GK	GER	Sascha Kirschstein (loan return to Hamburger SV)
33	FW	BRA	Cidimar (to FSV Frankfurt)

=== MSV Duisburg ===
In:

No.	Pos.	Nation	Player
14	DF	BRA	Bruno Soares (free agent)
15	DF	GER	Frank Fahrenhorst (from Hannover 96)
19	FW	DEN	Søren Larsen (on loan from FC Toulouse)
21	FW	BRA	Caiuby (on loan from VfL Wolfsburg)
26	MF	BUL	Chavdar Yankov (on loan from Hannover 96)
32	MF	GER	Änis Ben-Hatira (on loan from Hamburger SV, previously on loan)
34	MF	BEL	Kristoffer Andersen (from VfR Aalen)

Out:

No.	Pos.	Nation	Player
1	GK	GER	Sven Beuckert (released)
10	MF	COD	Cedric Makiadi (loan return to VfL Wolfsburg)
14	MF	CMR	Serge Branco (released) (Note: Serge Branco beim MSV ohne Zukunft: "Es tut weh")
15	MF	FRA	Grégory Christ (loan return to R. Charleroi S.C.)
19	FW	CMR	Dorge Kouemaha (to Club Brugge) (Note: "Kouemaha verlässt die "Zebras"" (in German). DFL. 30 August 2009.)
22	DF	URU	Pablo Cáceres (to AC Omonia)
30	MF	BRA	Maicon (on loan to Figueirense Futebol Clube) (Note: Brasilianer geht für ein Jahr in seine Heimat)
32	DF	GER	Markus Brzenska (loan return to Borussia Dortmund)
33	DF	CRO	Gordon Schildenfeld (loan return to Beşiktaş)
35	FW	GER	Marcel Heller (loan return to Eintracht Frankfurt)
--	MF	GER	Nils-Ole Book (to Rot Weiss Ahlen, previously on loan) (Note: "Book bleibt, ein anderer geht" (in German). DFL. 8 June 2009.)
--	FW	GER	Simon Terodde (to 1. FC Köln II, previously on loan at Fortuna Düsseldorf) (Note: "Terodde wechselt zum FC" (in German). Kölner Stadt-Anzeiger. 12 July 2009.)

=== 1. FC Kaiserslautern ===
In:

No.	Pos.	Nation	Player
4	MF	GER	Bastian Schulz (from Hannover 96)
8	MF	GER	Sidney Sam (on loan from Hamburger SV, previously on loan)
11	MF	GER	Danny Fuchs (from VfL Bochum, previously on loan)
14	DF	GER	Manuel Hornig (from 1. FC Kaiserslautern II)
15	MF	CMR	Georges Mandjeck (on loan from VfB Stuttgart)
18	DF	GER	Christoph Buchner (from SV Wacker Burghausen)
20	DF	BRA	Rodnei (on loan from Hertha BSC)
22	MF	CRO	Ivo Iličević (on loan from VfL Bochum, previously on loan at SpVgg Greuther Fürth)
25	MF	SUI	Daniel Pavlovic (on loan from FC Schaffhausen)
28	DF	POR	Marcel Correia (from 1. FC Kaiserslautern II) (Note: Zwei neue "Rote Teufel")
31	MF	TUR	Alper Akçam (from 1. FC Kaiserslautern II) (Note: ""Rote Teufel" binden Nachwuchsspieler" (in German). DFL. 9 June 2009.)
32	FW	SVK	Adam Nemec (from KRC Genk)
37	MF	POR	Ricky Pinheiro (from 1. FC Kaiserslautern II)

Out:

No.	Pos.	Nation	Player
4	DF	GER	Christopher Lamprecht (loan return to VfL Wolfsburg)
7	MF	GER	Sebastian Reinert (to SV Wehen Wiesbaden)
11	FW	GER	Marcel Ziemer (to SV Wehen Wiesbaden previously on loan) (Note: Stürmer Ziemer erhält Vertrag beim SV Wehen)
15	FW	CAN	Josh Simpson (to Manisaspor) (Note: Simpson verlässt den FCK)
18	MF	GER	Axel Bellinghausen (to FC Augsburg)
21	DF	TUN	Aïmen Demai (to Alemannia Aachen)
22	MF	ROU	Laurenţiu Reghecampf (released) (Note: Reghecampf löst Vertrag in Kaiserslautern auf)
25	MF	BIH	Said Husejinovic (loan return to Werder Bremen)

=== FC St. Pauli ===
In:

No.	Pos.	Nation	Player
5	MF	CAN	Jonathan Beaulieu-Bourgault (loan return from SV Wilhelmshaven)
7	MF	GER	Rouwen Hennings (from Hamburger SV, previously on loan)
13	MF	GER	Charles Takyi (from SpVgg Greuther Fürth)
16	MF	GER	Markus Thorandt (from TSV 1860 Munich)
18	MF	GER	Max Kruse (from Werder Bremen II)
20	MF	GER	Matthias Lehmann (from Alemannia Aachen)
23	FW	GER	Deniz Naki (from Bayer 04 Leverkusen II, previously on loan at Rot Weiss Ahlen)
32	DF	GHA	Davidson Drobo-Ampem (from FC St. Pauli II)
33	DF	GER	Mathias Hinzmann (from FC St. Pauli II)

Out:

No.	Pos.	Nation	Player
5	MF	GER	Björn Brunnemann (to 1. FC Union Berlin)
6	MF	CZE	Filip Trojan (to FSV Mainz 05)
9	FW	GER	René Schnitzler (to FC Wegberg-Beeck) (Note: Beeck verpflichtet Bundesliga-Spieler Rene Schnitzler)
13	DF	GER	Benjamin Weigelt (to SV Wehen Wiesbaden)
18	FW	GER	Alexander Ludwig (to TSV 1860 Munich)
23	MF	CAN	David Hoilett (loan return to Blackburn Rovers)
28	FW	TUR	Ömer Şişmanoğlu (to Kayserispor)

=== Rot-Weiß Oberhausen ===
In:

No.	Pos.	Nation	Player
6	MF	GER	Daniel Gordon (from Borussia Dortmund II)
8	MF	GER	Heinrich Schmidtgal (from VfL Bochum)
9	FW	GER	Patrick Schönfeld (from FSV Erlangen-Bruck)
13	FW	GER	Ronny König (from SV Wehen Wiesbaden)
17	DF	GER	Oliver Petersch (from Bayer 04 Leverkusen II)
18	DF	GER	Marinko Miletić (from Rot Weiss Ahlen)
28	FW	DEN	Mike Tullberg (from Reggina Calcio)
35	GK	GER	Marcel Dietz (from Rot-Weiß Oberhausen II)
36	DF	POL	Dominik Borutzki (from Rot-Weiß Oberhausen II)

Out:

No.	Pos.	Nation	Player
6	DF	GER	Kim Falkenberg (to SpVgg Greuther Fürth)
8	MF	GER	Jens Robben (to SV Meppen) (Note: Jens Robben als Sahnehäubchen)
9	FW	GER	Julian Lüttmann (released)
18	FW	GER	Christopher Nöthe (loan return to Borussia Dortmund II)
14	MF	GER	Tim Reichert (to Sportfreunde Siegen)
17	MF	GER	Ferhat Kiskanc (released)
22	FW	GER	Musa Celik (to Giresunspor) (Note: "Petersch kommt _ Celik in die Türkei" (in German). Der Westen. 17 June 2009.)
24	DF	GER	Tino Westphal (to Sportfreunde Siegen)
31	DF	BEL	Olivier de Cock (released)
40	GK	GER	Jonas Deumeland (released)

=== Rot Weiss Ahlen ===
In:

No.	Pos.	Nation	Player
1	GK	GER	Sascha Kirschstein (from Hamburger SV, previously on loan at SpVgg Greuther Fürth)
4	DF	NGA	Darlington Omodiagbe (from VfL Osnabrück)
7	MF	GHA	Mohammed Lartey (from Holstein Kiel)
9	FW	GER	Thomas Bröker (from Dynamo Dresden)
10	MF	GER	Nils-Ole Book (from MSV Duisburg, previously on loan)
12	FW	TUR	Bahattin Köse (from Rot Weiss Ahlen II) (Note: Rot Weiss hat drei neue Profis)
13	MF	POL	David Blacha (from Borussia Dortmund Youth)
14	MF	GER	Janis Kraus (from Rot Weiss Ahlen II)
16	MF	GER	Tim Gorschlüter (from Sportfreunde Lotte)
17	MF	BEL	Tom Moosmayer (from Kickers Emden)
18	MF	GER	Christian Mikolajczak (from FSV Frankfurt) (Note: "Fußballer Mikolajczak kehrt nach Ahlen zurück" (in German). Bild. 3 June 2009.)
22	FW	TUR	Cihan Özkara (from Rot Weiss Ahlen II)
24	MF	GER	Daniel Felgenhauer (from SpVgg Greuther Fürth)
25	MF	GER	Mario Vrančić (on loan from 1. FSV Mainz 05)
26	FW	CRO	Luka Tankulić (to Rot Weiss Ahlen Youth)
27	FW	GER	Marcel Reichwein (from Wuppertaler SV Borussia)
30	FW	COD	Dominick Kumbela (from SC Paderborn 07) (Note: Kumbela komplettiert den Kader für die kommende Saison)

Out:

No.	Pos.	Nation	Player
4	DF	SRB	Marinko Miletić (to Rot-Weiß Oberhausen)
7	MF	GER	Martin Stahlberg (released) (Note: Wechselbörse – 2009/10 Rot Weiss Ahlen)
9	FW	MWI	Daniel Chitsulo (released)
10	MF	USA	Grover Gibson (released)
16	FW	GER	René Müller (released) (Note: Lautes Hallo für Profi René Müller)
17	MF	GER	Philipp Heithölter (to SC Paderborn 07)
18	MF	GER	Marco Reus (to Borussia Mönchengladbach)
21	FW	GER	Kevin Großkreutz (to Borussia Dortmund)
22	MF	GER	Manuel Bölstler (to FC Rot-Weiß Erfurt) (Note: Manuel Bölstler kommt aus Ahlen – Rinik Carolus verlässt den RWE)
24	FW	GER	Deniz Naki (loan return to Bayer 04 Leverkusen II)

=== FC Augsburg ===
In:

No.	Pos.	Nation	Player
1	GK	GER	Simon Jentzsch (free agent)
6	DF	BEL	Jonas de Roeck (from K.A.A. Gent)
7	FW	ALB	Edmond Kapllani (from Karlsruher SC)
8	MF	GER	Axel Bellinghausen (from 1. FC Kaiserslautern)
11	MF	GER	Kevin Schindler (on loan from Werder Bremen, previously on loan at FC Hansa Rostock)
15	DF	GER	Dominik Reinhardt (on loan from 1. FC Nürnberg)
16	MF	FRA	Ibrahima Traore (from Hertha BSC)
17	DF	GER	Michael Schick (from TSV 1860 Munich)
18	MF	SVN	Goran Sukalo (from TuS Koblenz)
20	MF	CMR	Marcel Ndjeng (from Borussia Mönchengladbach, previously on loan at Hamburger SV)
24	MF	GER	Daniel Brinkmann (from Alemannia Aachen)
26	DF	GER	Stefan Buck (to FC Augsburg)

Out:

No.	Pos.	Nation	Player
5	DF	GER	Ingo Hertzsch (to RB Leipzig)
6	DF	GER	Thomas Kläsener (to RB Leipzig)
7	MF	GER	Daniel Baier (loan return to VfL Wolfsburg)
8	FW	CMR	Francis Kioyo (to FC Aarau)
11	FW	GER	Marco Vorbeck (retired)
14	GK	GER	Patrick Lehner (released)
15	DF	AUT	Mark Prettenthaler (to Sturm Graz)
17	DF	GER	Lars Müller (to RB Leipzig) (Note: WEITERER NEUZUGANG FÜR RB LEIPZIG: ROTE BULLEN VERPFLICHTEN LARS MÜLLER)
18	MF	MAR	Mourad Hdiouad (released) (Note: "Partystimmung mit leisen Mißtönen" (in German). Augsburger Allgemeine. 20 June 2009.)
19	FW	GER	Marco Küntzel (released)
20	DF	GER	Christian Müller (to FSV Frankfurt)
30	GK	GER	Sven Neuhaus (to RB Leipzig)
--	FW	UKR	Anton Makarenko (to SSV Reutlingen, previously on loan)

=== TSV 1860 Munich ===
In:

No.	Pos.	Nation	Player
1	GK	HUN	Gabor Kiraly (from Burnley FC, previously on loan at Bayer 04 Leverkusen)
2	DF	SRB	Antonio Rukavina (from Borussia Dortmund, previously on loan)
3	DF	BRA	Marcos Antonio (from Sport Club Corinthians Alagoano)
5	DF	TUN	Radhouène Felhi (on loan from Étoile Sportive du Sahel)
8	MF	SRB	Aleksandar Ignjoski (on loan from OFK Belgrade) (Note: Aleksandar Ignjovski verstärkt die Löwen)
17	FW	GRE	Charilaos Pappas (from Skoda Xanthi)
18	FW	GER	Alexander Ludwig (from FC St. Pauli)
20	MF	GER	Tarik Camdal (from TSV 1860 Munich Youth) (Note: Vierjahresvertrag für Löwen-Talent Tarik Camdal)
21	MF	GER	Sandro Kaiser (from TSV 1860 Munich II) (Note: Das Löwenteam 2009/2010)
24	MF	ROU	Florin Lovin (from FC Steaua II București)
26	MF	GER	Peniel Mlapa (from TSV 1860 Munich Youth)
31	MF	MNE	Ardijan Djokaj (from TuS Koblenz) (Note: Djokaj erhält Einjahresvertrag bei den Löwen)
32	FW	KOS	Kushtrim Lushtaku (from KF Drenica) (Note: Talent Lushtaku erhält Dreijahresvertrag)
33	FW	USA	Kenny Cooper (from FC Dallas)
--	FW	GER	Marvin Pourie (on loan from FC Schalke 04, previously on loan)

Out:

No.	Pos.	Nation	Player
3	DF	GER	Michael Schick (to FC Augsburg)
8	MF	GER	Danny Schwarz (to FC Bayern Munich II) (Note: Bayern-Amateure holen Ex-"Löwen" Schwarz)
16	MF	GER	Markus Thorandt (to FC St. Pauli)
17	MF	GER	Sven Bender (to Borussia Dortmund)
20	DF	GER	Christoph Burkhard (to SV Wacker Burghausen)
21	FW	GER	Markus Schroth (released)
22	MF	GER	Lars Bender (to Bayer 04 Leverkusen)
24	MF	SRB	Nikola Gulan (loan return to AC Fiorentina)
25	MF	CAN	Nikolas Ledgerwood (to FSV Frankfurt)
26	MF	AUT	Julian Baumgartlinger (to FK Austria Wien)
33	MF	GER	Fabian Johnson (to VfL Wolfsburg)

=== FC Hansa Rostock ===
In:

No.	Pos.	Nation	Player
5	DF	GER	Tim Sebastian (from Karlsruher SC)
7	MF	GER	Oliver Schröder (from VfL Bochum)
11	FW	GER	Enrico Neitzel (from Kickers Emden)
14	MF	GER	Kevin Schlitte (from SC Freiburg)
16	DF	RSA	Bradley Carnell (from Karlsruher SC)
24	FW	GER	Marcel Schied (from Eintracht Braunschweig)
30	FW	MTQ	Malick Bolivard (from FC Hansa Rostock II) (Note: Malick Bolivard gehört ab sofort zum Profi-Kader)
33	GK	GER	Alexander Walke (from SV Wehen Wiesbaden) (Note: "Walke und Sebastian kommen" (in German). Schweriner Volkszeitung. 28 May 2009.)

Out:

No.	Pos.	Nation	Player
1	GK	GER	Stefan Wächter (released)
3	DF	USA	Heath Pearce (released)
6	DF	GER	Benjamin Lense (to TuS Koblenz)
7	FW	FRA	Régis Dorn (to SV Sandhausen) (Note: "Wir verpflichten Regis Dorn!" (in German). SV Sandhausen. 24 June 2009.)
8	MF	HUN	Krisztián Lisztes (to Paksi SE) (Note: Pakson vezet le Lisztes Krisztián)
10	MF	TUR	Zafer Yelen (to Trabzonspor)
14	MF	DEN	Sebastian Svard (loan return to Borussia Mönchengladbach)
15	FW	FIN	Henri Myntti (released)
16	DF	COD	Assani Lukimya-Mulongoti (to FC Carl Zeiss Jena)
17	MF	GER	Tobias Rathgeb (released)
20	FW	GER	Kevin Schindler (loan return to Werder Bremen)
23	DF	BRA	Diego Morais Pacheco (released)
24	GK	GER	Kenneth Kronholm (to SV Eintracht Trier 05)
25	MF	GER	Simon Tüting (to 1. FC Magdeburg)
28	DF	BRA	Gledson (to FSV Frankfurt)
33	FW	TUR	Guido Kocer (to SV Babelsberg 03) (Note: Noch ein Stürmer – Kocer kommt)

=== TuS Koblenz ===
In:

No.	Pos.	Nation	Player
5	DF	CZE	Martin Hudec (on loan from SK Sigma Olomouc) (Note: Perfekt! Melinho und Martin Hudec wechseln zur TuS!)
7	FW	GER	Johannes Rahn (from VfB Stuttgart II)
8	MF	GER	Tom Geißler (from VfL Osnabrück)
12	DF	GER	Benjamin Lense (from FC Hansa Rostock)
13	DF	GER	Philipp Langen (on loan from SpVgg Greuther Fürth)
14	DF	GER	Rico Morack (from Hertha BSC II) (Note: Nächster Neuzugang: Rico Morack wechselt zur TuS!)
16	MF	BRA	Everson (from Etoile Sportive du Sahel)
17	MF	GER	Christian Müller (from Energie Cottbus)
19	FW	GER	Lucas Musculus (from 1. FC Köln Youth)
20	MF	BRA	Melinho (on loan from SK Sigma Olomouc)
21	FW	SUI	Aljmir Murati (on loan from FC La Chaux-de-Fonds) (Note: Perfekt! Aljmir Murati wechselt zur TuS!)
27	MF	KOS	Shqipran Skeraj (from KF Pristina, previously on loan at SpVgg Greuther Fürth)
32	FW	FIN	Shefki Kuqi (from Crystal Palace F.C.) (Note: Shefki Kuqi unterschreibt für 2 Jahre bei der TuS!)
40	GK	GER	Dieter Paucken (from SV Roßbach/Wied) (Note: Nächster Transfer: Dieter Paucken kommt zur TuS!)
--	MF	ALB	Ervin Skela (from FC Energie Cottbus)

Out:

No.	Pos.	Nation	Player
4	MF	GER	Rüdiger Ziehl (released)
5	DF	BIH	Branimir Bajić (to Denizlispor) (Note: Branimir Bajic Denizlispor'da)
7	MF	ITA	Salvatore Gambino (released)
11	FW	ALB	Fatmir Vata (to Wuppertaler SV) (Note: Fatmir Vata wechselt zum WSV)
13	DF	SRB	Marko Lomić (to FK Partizan)
14	FW	GER	Tayfun Pektürk (to Eintracht Trier) (Note: Tayfun Pektürk wechselt zu Eintracht Trier)
18	DF	GER	Andreas Richter (to Chemnitzer FC)
19	MF	MNE	Ardijan Djokaj (to TSV 1860 Munich)
20	FW	GER	Manuel Fischer (loan return to VfB Stuttgart II)
21	MF	SVN	Goran Šukalo (to FC Augsburg)
22	FW	KOR	Cha Du-Ri (to SC Freiburg)
25	MF	BFA	Alassane Ouedraogo (released)
26	MF	GRE	Evangelos Nessos (retired)
29	FW	ALG	Noureddine Daham (released) (Note: "Nicht nur im Angriff herrscht Handlungsbedarf" (in German). Rhein-Zeitung. 1 June 2009.)
30	FW	GER	Dominik Mader (to TSV Crailsheim)
33	GK	GER	André Weis (to SV Wilhelmshaven) (Note: Das Personal-Karussell nimmt Fahrt auf – Planungen laufen weiter (>>WZ<<-Bericht))
35	FW	USA	Matt Taylor (to FSV Frankfurt)
36	FW	CMR	Cesar M'Boma (released)

=== FSV Frankfurt ===
In:

No.	Pos.	Nation	Player
6	DF	GER	Christian Müller (from FC Augsburg)
7	MF	CAN	Nikolas Ledgerwood (from TSV 1860 Munich)
10	MF	MLI	Soumaila Coulibaly (from Borussia Mönchengladbach)
13	MF	GER	Alexander Voigt (from SpVgg Greuther Fürth)
15	FW	MLI	Bakary Diakité (from SV Wehen Wiesbaden)
16	FW	USA	Matt Taylor (from TuS Koblenz)
18	MF	GER	Jürgen Gjasula (from FC Basel)
19	GK	ESP	Pablo Álvarez (from Eintracht Frankfurt II)
20	GK	GER	Florian Stahl (from SV Wehen Wiesbaden)
21	DF	GER	Dajan Šimac (from SV Wehen Wiesbaden)
23	DF	GAM	Pa Saikou Kujabi (from SV Ried)
24	MF	BIH	Benjamin Pintol (from FSV Frankfurt Youth)
25	MF	FIN	Pekka Lagerblom (from Alemannia Aachen)
27	FW	GER	Aziz Bouhaddouz (loan return from FC Erzgebirge Aue)
28	DF	BRA	Gledson (from F.C. Hansa Rostock)
29	MF	TUR	Anıl Albayrak (from FSV Frankfurt II)
30	FW	BRA	Cidimar (from SpVgg Greuther Fürth)
34	FW	IRN	Behnam Tayebi (from FSV Frankfurt II) (Note: Hohe Fluktuation beim FSV Frankfurt- Das Manchester City der 2. Liga?)
37	FW	PER	Junior Ross (from Coronel Bolognesi, previously on loan)
39	FW	MNE	Sanibal Orahovac (from SV Wehen Wiesbaden)

Out:

No.	Pos.	Nation	Player
2	DF	GER	Daniel Schumann (released) (Note: Wechselbörse FSV Frankfurt)
5	DF	GER	Dennis Hillebrand (to FC Rot-Weiss Erfurt) (Note: Dennis Hillebrand wechselt zu RW Erfurt)
6	MF	GER	Thomas Sobotzik (to 1. FC Oberstedten)
7	MF	GER	Matthias Hagner (to Eintracht Wetzlar) (Note: Matthias Krebs nach Wetzlar)
10	MF	GRE	Giorgos Theodoridis (to Panetolikos F.C.) (Note: Georgios Theodoridis – Panaitolikos Agrinio)
11	FW	SVK	Henrich Benčík (to VfL Osnabrück) (Note: Coup für den VfL Osnabrück: Bencik kommt)
11	FW	GER	Thomas Brendel (to 1. FC Eschborn)
13	GK	GER	Christian Como (to Kickers Offenbach II) (Note: Christian Como – Offizielle Homepage)
14	DF	GER	Lars Weißenfeldt (released)
15	MF	CZE	Radek Špiláček (released)
16	FW	MAR	Fikri El Haj Ali (to SV Wacker Burghausen)
18	MF	GER	Christian Mikolajczak (to Rot Weiss Ahlen)
20	FW	IRN	Amir Shapourzadeh (to Steel Azin F.C.) (Note: Iran: Ali Karimi Signs For Steel Azin)
21	FW	GER	Jochen Höfler (to RB Leipzig)
22	MF	ESP	Marc Gallego (to FSV Frankfurt II) (Note: Am Ende fehlt das Quäntchen Glück)
24	MF	ITA	Angelo Barletta (to VfL Osnabrück)
25	GK	GER	Marjan Petković (to Eintracht Braunschweig)
27	FW	BLR	Gennadi Bliznyuk (to FC Sibir Novosibirsk) (Note: Blizniuk in Sibirien)
28	MF	GER	Markus Kreuz (to WAC St. Andrä) (Note: WAC|ST.ANDRÄ und SK ST.ANDRÄ/WAC: Alle Zu- und Abgänge in der Sommerpause)
33	DF	GER	Emil Noll (to FC Vaduz)
30	MF	GER	Christian Eggert (to Borussia Dortmund II) (Note: Eggert geht vom FSV zum BVB)
36	MF	MAR	Youssef Mokhtari (to SpVgg Greuther Fürth)
38	FW	FRA	David Ulm (to Kickers Offenbach)

=== 1. FC Union Berlin ===
In:

No.	Pos.	Nation	Player
3	MF	GER	Dominic Peitz (from VfL Osnabrück)
6	DF	BEL	Bernd Rauw (from Kickers Emden)
9	FW	COL	John Mosquera (on loan from SV Werder Bremen)
13	GK	GER	Christoph Haker (from 1. FC Union Berlin Youth) (Note: Wechselbörse Union Berlin)
23	MF	GER	Björn Brunnemann (from FC St. Pauli)

Out:

No.	Pos.	Nation	Player
3	DF	GER	Mischa Welm (to SpVgg Weiden)
6	MF	GER	Ludwig Lippold (released)
9	FW	GER	Dustin Heun (to 1. FC Kaiserslautern II)
11	MF	TUR	Erdal Baştürk (released)
11	GK	GER	Eric Niendorf (to 1. FC Union Berlin II)
14	MF	GER	Sebastian Bönig (to FC Erding)
19	FW	GER	Nico Patschinski (to BFC Dynamo) (Note: Ex-Unioner Patschinski geht zurück zum BFC Dynamo)
20	MF	GER	Kevin Maek (to Werder Bremen II)

=== Fortuna Düsseldorf ===
In:

No.	Pos.	Nation	Player
2	DF	GER	Christian Weber (from AEL)
7	MF	GER	Oliver Fink (from SpVgg Unterhaching)
13	FW	RUS	Dmitri Bulykin (on loan from R.S.C. Anderlecht)
15	FW	BFA	Patrick Zoundi (from Panserraikos F.C.)
20	DF	BRA	Anderson (on loan from Bayer 04 Leverkusen, previously on loan at VfL Osnabrück)
21	MF	GER	Johannes van den Bergh (from Borussia Mönchengladbach)
23	DF	JPN	Kozo Yuki (free agent) (Note: Abflug für Audi, Vertrag für Kozo)
31	DF	GER	Kai Schwertfeger (from Fortuna Düsseldorf II) (Note: Große Überraschung Fortuna: Neuer Vertrag für Kai Schwertfeger)
34		AUT	Martin Harnik (on loan from Werder Bremen)

Out:

No.	Pos.	Nation	Player
2	MF	FRA	Bruno Custos (released)
13	FW	GER	Simon Terodde (loan return to MSV Duisburg)
15	FW	GER	Ahmet Çebe (to Denizlispor)
16	DF	FRA	Clement Halet (released)
20	FW	ALB	Bekim Kastrati (to Dynamo Dresden) (Note: Kastrati soll es richten)
40	DF	GER	Johannes Walbaum (to FC Wegberg-Beeck)

=== SC Paderborn 07 ===
In:

No.	Pos.	Nation	Player
2	MF	GER	Rudolf Zedi (from Kickers Emden)
8	DF	GER	Sebastian Schachten (on loan from Borussia Mönchengladbach)
11	FW	TUR	Mahir Sağlık (on loan from VfL Wolfsburg, previously on loan at Karlsruher SC)
17	MF	GER	Philipp Heithölter (from Rot Weiss Ahlen)
22	GK	GER	Daniel Masuch (from Kickers Emden)
29	FW	ITA	Gaetano Manno (from VfL Osnabrück)
39	FW	TUN	Nejmeddin Daghfous (from FSV Mainz 05 II) (Note: "Paderborn holt Mainzer Fussballprofi Daghfous" (in German). Bild. 9 June 2009.)

Out:

No.	Pos.	Nation	Player
8	MF	GER	Karsten Fischer (to Wuppertaler SV Borussia) (Note: Wuppertal holt Fischer von Paderborn)
11	FW	COD	Dominick Kumbela (to Rot Weiss Ahlen)
17	MF	GER	Patrick Reinsch (to SV Wilhelmshaven)
22	FW	SRB	Jovan Damjanovic (to SV Wehen Wiesbaden)
25	MF	GER	Björn Lindemann (to VfL Osnabrück)

== See also ==
- 2009–10 Bundesliga
- 2009–10 2. Bundesliga
- List of German football transfers winter 2009–10
