= List of German football transfers winter 2009–10 =

This is a list of German football transfers in the 2009–10 winter transfer window by club. Only transfers of the Bundesliga, and 2. Bundesliga are included.

== Bundesliga ==
=== VfL Wolfsburg ===
In:

Out:

Note: Flags indicate national team as has been defined under FIFA eligibility rules. Players may hold more than one non-FIFA nationality.

No.	Pos.	Nation	Player
5	DF	BRA	Réver (from Grêmio)

No.	Pos.	Nation	Player
3	DF	BRA	Rodrigo Alvim (released)
5	DF	POR	Ricardo Costa (to OSC Lille)
28	MF	GER	Daniel Baier (to FC Augsburg)}

=== FC Bayern Munich ===
In:

No.	Pos.	Nation	Player
26	DF	GER	Diego Contento (from FC Bayern Munich II)
32	MF	TUR	Mehmet Ekici (from FC Bayern Munich II)

Out:

No.	Pos.	Nation	Player
4	DF	NED	Edson Braafheid (on loan to Celtic Glasgow)
9	FW	ITA	Luca Toni (on loan to AS Roma)
15	DF	BRA	Breno (on loan to 1. FC Nürnberg)
16	MF	GER	Andreas Ottl (on loan to 1. FC Nürnberg)
19	MF	GER	Alexander Baumjohann (to FC Schalke 04)

=== VfB Stuttgart ===
In:

No.	Pos.	Nation	Player
21	DF	ITA	Cristian Molinaro (on loan from Juventus FC)

Out:

No.	Pos.	Nation	Player
8	MF	CZE	Jan Šimák (to 1. FSV Mainz 05)
10	MF	TUR	Yıldıray Baştürk (to Blackburn Rovers F.C.)
11	MF	GER	Thomas Hitzlsperger (to S.S. Lazio)
21	DF	SUI	Ludovic Magnin (to FC Zürich)
25	MF	BRA	Élson (on loan to Hannover 96)

=== Hertha BSC ===
In:

No.	Pos.	Nation	Player
16	DF	CZE	Roman Hubnik (on loan from FK Moscow, previously on loan at AC Sparta Prague)
17	FW	GRE	Theofanis Gekas (on loan from Bayer 04 Leverkusen)
21	DF	GEO	Levan Kobiashvili (from FC Schalke 04)

Out:

No.	Pos.	Nation	Player
2	DF	BRA	Kaká (on loan to AC Omonia)
17	MF	USA	Bryan Arguez (released)
27	MF	BRA	César (to Al-Ahli)
33	FW	BRA	André Lima (on loan to Fluminense, previously on loan at Botafogo)

=== Hamburger SV ===
In:

No.	Pos.	Nation	Player
22	FW	NED	Ruud van Nistelrooy (from Real Madrid)
25	MF	VEN	Tomás Rincón (from Deportivo Táchira, previously on loan)
27	MF	GER	Sören Bertram (from Hamburger SV II)

Out:

No.	Pos.	Nation	Player
2	DF	BRA	Alex Silva (on loan to São Paulo FC)
28	MF	SEN	Mickaël Tavares (on loan to 1. FC Nürnberg)

=== Borussia Dortmund ===
In:

No.	Pos.	Nation	Player

Out:

No.	Pos.	Nation	Player

=== TSG 1899 Hoffenheim ===
In:

No.	Pos.	Nation	Player
27	MF	GER	Denis Thomalla (from Karlsruher SC U-19)

Out:

No.	Pos.	Nation	Player
27	GK	AUT	Ramazan Özcan (on loan to Besiktas J.K.)

=== FC Schalke 04 ===
In:

No.	Pos.	Nation	Player
3	DF	NOR	Tore Reginiussen (from Tromsø IL)
7	MF	CHN	Hao Junmin (from Tianjin Teda)
9	FW	BRA	Edu (from Suwon Bluewings)
11	MF	GER	Alexander Baumjohann (from FC Bayern Munich)
12	MF	GER	Peer Kluge (from 1. FC Nürnberg)
15	MF	BRA	Ze Roberto (loan return from Clube de Regatas do Flamengo)
19	FW	SUI	Mario Gavranović (from Neuchâtel Xamax)
28	MF	GER	Christoph Moritz (from FC Schalke 04 II)
29	FW	KAZ	Bogdan Müller (from SpVgg Neckarelz)
34	FW	MKD	Besart Ibraimi (from FK Renova)

Out:

No.	Pos.	Nation	Player
3	MF	GEO	Levan Kobiashvili (to Hertha BSC)
7	MF	GER	Lewis Holtby (on loan to VfL Bochum)
19	FW	TUR	Halil Altıntop (to Eintracht Frankfurt)
29	DF	SVK	Ľuboš Hanzel (loan return to FC Spartak Trnava)
41	FW	GER	Marvin Pourie (on loan to TuS Koblenz, previously on loan at TSV 1860 Munich)

=== Bayer 04 Leverkusen ===
In:

No.	Pos.	Nation	Player
37	MF	SLO	Kevin Kampl (from Bayer 04 Leverkusen II)

Out:

No.	Pos.	Nation	Player
17	FW	GER	Richard Sukuta-Pasu (on loan to FC St. Pauli)
26	DF	TOG	Assimiou Touré (on loan to Arminia Bielefeld)
29	FW	GRE	Theofanis Gekas (on loan to Hertha BSC)
33	MF	GER	Pierre de Wit (to 1. FC Kaiserslautern)
--	DF	GER	Bastian Oczipka (on loan to FC St. Pauli, previously on loan at F.C. Hansa Rostock)

=== Werder Bremen ===
In:

No.	Pos.	Nation	Player
16	DF	TUN	Aymen Abdennour (on loan from Etoile du Sahel)
19	FW	GER	Sandro Wagner (from MSV Duisburg)
42	GK	GER	Felix Wiedwald (from SV Werder Bremen II)
43	MF	GER	Pascal Testroet (from SV Werder Bremen II)
47	FW	TUR	Onur Ayik (from SV Werder Bremen II)

Out:

No.	Pos.	Nation	Player
5	DF	SRB	Duško Tošić (released)
7	MF	CRO	Jurica Vranješ (on loan to Gençlerbirliği S.K.)
28	MF	GER	Kevin Schindler (on loan to MSV Duisburg, previously on loan at FC Augsburg)
39	FW	BOL	Marcelo Moreno (loan return to Shakhtar Donetsk)
47	FW	GER	Torsten Oehrl (on loan to Fortuna Düsseldorf)

=== Hannover 96 ===
In:

No.	Pos.	Nation	Player
4	DF	SVK	Jan Durica (on loan from Lokomotiv Moscow)
12	GK	GER	Uwe Gospodarek (from SV Wacker Burghausen)
18	FW	CIV	Arouna Koné (on loan from Sevilla F.C.)
25	MF	BRA	Élson (on loan from VfB Stuttgart)

Out:

No.	Pos.	Nation	Player
--	MF	BUL	Chavdar Yankov (to Metallurg Donetsk, previously on loan at MSV Duisburg)

=== 1. FC Köln ===
In:

No.	Pos.	Nation	Player
14	FW	SRB	Zoran Tošić (on loan from Manchester United F.C.)
31	DF	GER	Alexander Vaaßen (from 1. FC Köln II)

Out:

No.	Pos.	Nation	Player
4	DF	GER	Marvin Matip (on loan to Karlsruher SC)
14	FW	BFA	Wilfried Sanou (on loan to Urawa Red Diamonds)
26	MF	GER	Lukas Nottbeck (on loan to Borussia Dortmund II)
30	FW	GER	Michael Gardawski (on loan to FC Carl Zeiss Jena)

=== Eintracht Frankfurt ===
In:

No.	Pos.	Nation	Player
13	DF	USA	Ricardo Clark (from Houston Dynamo)
19	MF	TUR	Halil Altıntop (from FC Schalke 04)

Out:

No.	Pos.	Nation	Player
13	MF	GER	Markus Steinhöfer (on loan to 1. FC Kaiserslautern)
15	FW	IRI	Mehdi Mahdavikia (to Steel Azin F.C.)
20	MF	GER	Christoph Preuß (Retired)
--	DF	FRA	Habib Bellaïd (on loan to US Boulogne, previously on loan at Racing Strasbourg)

=== VfL Bochum ===
In:

No.	Pos.	Nation	Player
17	MF	GER	Lewis Holtby (on loan from FC Schalke 04)
28	MF	SRB	Miloš Marić (from K.A.A. Gent)
29	FW	GER	Roman Prokoph (from VfL Bochum II)
32	FW	GER	Mirkan Aydın (from VfL Bochum II)

Out:

No.	Pos.	Nation	Player
1	GK	POR	Daniel Fernandes (on loan to Iraklis)
15	MF	CAN	Daniel Imhof (to FC St. Gallen)
23	MF	JPN	Shinji Ono (to Shimizu S-Pulse)

=== Borussia Mönchengladbach ===
In:

No.	Pos.	Nation	Player

Out:

No.	Pos.	Nation	Player
5	DF	CIV	Steve Gohouri (to Wigan Athletic)
34	DF	DEN	Sebastian Svärd (to Roda JC)

=== SC Freiburg ===
In:

No.	Pos.	Nation	Player
4	MF	TUN	Hamed Namouchi (free agent)
9	FW	SEN	Papiss Cissé (from FC Metz)
39	DF	FRA	Jackson Mendy (from SC Freiburg II)

Out:

No.	Pos.	Nation	Player
17	MF	CMR	Alain Junior Ollé Ollé (on loan to Rot Weiss Ahlen)
19	MF	GER	Andreas Glockner (on loan to TuS Koblenz)
22	MF	NGR	Eke Uzoma (on loan to TSV 1860 Munich)

=== FSV Mainz 05 ===
In:

No.	Pos.	Nation	Player
3	DF	SVK	Radoslav Zabavnik (from FC Terek Grozny)
5	MF	USA	Jared Jeffrey (from Club Brugge)
10	MF	CZE	Jan Šimák (from VfB Stuttgart)
28	FW	HUN	Ádám Szalai (on loan from Real Madrid Castilla)
--	DF	GER	Malik Fathi (on loan from FC Spartak Moscow)

Out:

No.	Pos.	Nation	Player
3	DF	BEL	Peter van der Heyden (to Club Brugge)
8	FW	SRB	Srđan Baljak (to MSV Duisburg)
13	MF	MNE	Milorad Peković (to SpVgg Greuther Fürth)
27	MF	GER	Daniel Gunkel (to TuS Koblenz)

=== 1. FC Nürnberg ===
In:

No.	Pos.	Nation	Player
3	DF	BRA	Breno (on loan from FC Bayern Munich)
28	DF	GER	Andreas Ottl (on loan from FC Bayern Munich)
34	DF	GER	Philipp Wollscheid (from 1. FC Nürnberg II)
—	MF	SEN	Mickaël Tavares (on loan from Hamburger SV)

Out:

No.	Pos.	Nation	Player
13	MF	GER	Peter Perchtold (to 1. FC Nürnberg II)
21	MF	AUS	Dario Vidosic (on loan to MSV Duisburg)
23	DF	AUS	Matthew Špiranović (on loan to Urawa Red Diamonds)
24	MF	GER	Peer Kluge (to FC Schalke 04)
31	DF	POL	Tomasz Welnicki (to 1. FC Nürnberg II)
33	FW	TUR	Güngör Kaya (to 1. FC Nürnberg II)

== 2. Bundesliga ==
=== FC Energie Cottbus ===
In:

No.	Pos.	Nation	Player
22	MF	GER	Heiko Schwarz (from Energie Cottbus II)
28	MF	GER	Clemens Fandrich (from FC Energie Cottbus II)

Out:

No.	Pos.	Nation	Player
1	GK	CAN	Lars Hirschfeld (to Vålerenga Fotball)
7	MF	GER	Timo Rost (to RB Leipzig)

=== Karlsruher SC ===
In:

No.	Pos.	Nation	Player
--	DF	GER	Marvin Matip (on loan from 1. FC Köln)

Out:

No.	Pos.	Nation	Player

=== Arminia Bielefeld ===
In:

No.	Pos.	Nation	Player
26	DF	TOG	Assimiou Touré (on loan from Bayer 04 Leverkusen)
28	FW	AUT	Dominik Rotter (from 1. Simmeringer SC)
40	GK	GER	Patrick Platins (from VfL Wolfsburg II)

Out:

No.	Pos.	Nation	Player
34	DF	SRB	Filip Krstić (to SV Babelsberg 03)

=== Alemannia Aachen ===
In:

No.	Pos.	Nation	Player
3	DF	DEN	Allan K. Jepsen (from Randers FC)

Out:

No.	Pos.	Nation	Player
23	FW	BFA	Hervé Oussalé (to RAEC Mons)

=== SpVgg Greuther Fürth ===
In:

No.	Pos.	Nation	Player
19	MF	MNE	Milorad Peković (from 1. FSV Mainz 05)
26	GK	SLO	Matjaž Rozman (from NK Interblock)

Out:

No.	Pos.	Nation	Player
16	MF	MAR	Youssef Mokhtari (to FC Metz)
25	MF	BIH	Ante Serdarušić (released)

=== MSV Duisburg ===
In:

No.	Pos.	Nation	Player
9	FW	SRB	Srđan Baljak (from 1. FSV Mainz 05)
26	MF	AUS	Dario Vidosic (on loan from 1. FC Nürnberg)
--	MF	GER	Kevin Schindler (on loan from SV Werder Bremen, previously on loan at FC Augsburg)

Out:

No.	Pos.	Nation	Player
7	FW	GER	Sandro Wagner (to SV Werder Bremen)
9	FW	GER	Chinedu Ede (to 1. FC Union Berlin)
26	MF	BUL	Chavdar Yankov (loan return to Hannover 96)

=== 1. FC Kaiserslautern ===
In:

No.	Pos.	Nation	Player
21	MF	GER	Pierre de Wit (from Bayer 04 Leverkusen)
27	GK	AUT	Marco Knaller (from 1. FC Kaiserslautern II)
33	MF	GER	Markus Steinhöfer (on loan from Eintracht Frankfurt)

Out:

No.	Pos.	Nation	Player
10	MF	GER	Anel Džaka (on loan to TuS Koblenz)
24	FW	GER	Kai Hesse (to Kickers Offenbach)
37	MF	POR	Ricky Pinheiro (on loan to VfL Osnabrück)

=== FC St. Pauli ===
In:

No.	Pos.	Nation	Player
3	MF	GER	Bastian Oczipka (on loan from Bayer 04 Leverkusen, previously on loan at F.C. Hansa Rostock)
19	FW	GER	Richard Sukuta-Pasu (on loan from Bayer 04 Leverkusen)

Out:

No.	Pos.	Nation	Player

=== Rot-Weiß Oberhausen ===
In:

No.	Pos.	Nation	Player
14	FW	BIH	Esad Razic (from Olympiakos Nicosia)
24	DF	GER	Kevin Kolberg (from Rot-Weiss Oberhausen II)

Out:

No.	Pos.	Nation	Player
11	FW	TTO	Jamal Gay (to Dardanel Spor A.Ş.)
27	MF	GER	Benjamin Schüßler (to Holstein Kiel)

=== Rot Weiss Ahlen ===
In:

No.	Pos.	Nation	Player
3	MF	GER	Benjamin Kern (from FC Augsburg)
15	FW	SEN	Momar N'Diaye (from FC Metz)
17	DF	BEL	Siebe Blondelle (from FCV Dender)
18	FW	COD	Serge Lofo Bongeli (from AS Vita Club)
24	FW	NED	Julian Jenner (on loan from Vitesse Arnhem)
27	MF	COD	Tychique Ntela Kalema (from AS Vita Club)
28	MF	CMR	Alain Junior Ollé Ollé (on loan from SC Freiburg)
39	FW	BIH	Duško Stajić (from FK Modriča)

Out:

No.	Pos.	Nation	Player
6	DF	GER	Ronald Maul (retired)
15	DF	AUS	Dino Djulbic (to Gold Coast United FC)
17	MF	BEL	Tom Moosmayer (to Kickers Offenbach)
18	MF	GER	Christian Mikolajczak (to Dynamo Dresden)
24	DF	GER	Daniel Felgenhauer (released)
27	FW	GER	Marcel Reichwein (to Jahn Regensburg)
30	FW	COD	Dominick Kumbela (to Eintracht Braunschweig)

=== FC Augsburg ===
In:

No.	Pos.	Nation	Player
7	FW	ANG	Nando Rafael (on loan from AGF Aarhus)
11	MF	GER	Daniel Baier (from VfL Wolfsburg)
22	DF	MAR	Youssef El-Akchaoui (on loan from NEC)
--	MF	GER	Daniel Baier (from VfL Wolfsburg)

Out:

No.	Pos.	Nation	Player
4	MF	GER	Benjamin Kern (to Rot-Weiss Ahlen)
7	FW	ALB	Edmond Kapllani (on loan to TuS Koblenz)
11	MF	GER	Kevin Schindler (loan return to SV Werder Bremen)
22	MF	GER	Patrick Mölzl (to FC Ingolstadt 04)

=== TSV 1860 Munich ===
In:

No.	Pos.	Nation	Player
9	FW	SRB	Đorđe Rakić (on loan from FC Red Bull Salzburg)
22	MF	NGR	Eke Uzoma (on loan from SC Freiburg)

Out:

No.	Pos.	Nation	Player
9	FW	ITA	Antonio di Salvo (to SV Kapfenberg)
13	DF	GER	Florian Jungwirth (to Dynamo Dresden)
23	DF	GER	Benjamin Schwarz (on loan to SpVgg Unterhaching)
28	DF	GER	Matthias Wittek (to FC Ingolstadt 04)
31	MF	MNE	Ardian Đokaj (released)
33	FW	USA	Kenny Cooper (on loan to Plymouth Argyle F.C.)
41	FW	GER	Marvin Pourie (loan return to FC Schalke 04)

=== FC Hansa Rostock ===
In:

No.	Pos.	Nation	Player
3	DF	SWE	Andreas Dahlén (from Gefle IF)
8	MF	GER	Kevin Pannewitz (from FC Hansa Rostock II)
20	DF	GER	Florian Grossert (from Türkiyemspor Berlin)
21	MF	ISL	Helgi Danielsson (from IF Elfsborg)
22	FW	ISL	Gardar Johannsson (from Fredrikstad FK)

Out:

No.	Pos.	Nation	Player
10	FW	GER	Thomas Breu (to TSV Buchbach)
15	FW	FIN	Henri Myntti (to Tampere United)
17	MF	GER	Tobias Rathgeb (to VfB Stuttgart II)
18	DF	GER	Bastian Oczipka (loan return to Bayer 04 Leverkusen)
22	MF	GER	Sebastian Albert (to RB Leipzig)

=== TuS Koblenz ===
In:

No.	Pos.	Nation	Player
21	MF	GER	Anel Džaka (on loan from 1. FC Kaiserslautern)
26	FW	ALB	Edmond Kapllani (on loan from FC Augsburg)
29	MF	GER	Andreas Glockner (on loan from SC Freiburg)
34	MF	GER	Daniel Gunkel (from 1. FSV Mainz 05)
36	FW	GER	Marvin Pourie (on loan from FC Schalke 04)

Out:

No.	Pos.	Nation	Player
21	FW	SUI	Aljmir Murati (loan return to La Chaux-de-Fonds)
25	MF	ALB	Renaldo Rama (released)
32	FW	FIN	Shefki Kuqi (to Swansea)

=== FSV Frankfurt ===
In:

No.	Pos.	Nation	Player
9	FW	GER	Sascha Mölders (from Rot-Weiss Essen)
20	GK	GER	Daniel Ischdonat (free agent)
--	MF	ROU	Vlad Munteanu (on loan form VfL Wolfsburg II)

Out:

No.	Pos.	Nation	Player
9	FW	ARG	Matías Cenci (to SV Sandhausen)
20	GK	GER	Florian Stahl (released)

=== 1. FC Union Berlin ===
In:

No.	Pos.	Nation	Player
14	MF	GER	Paul Thomik (free agent)
19	FW	GER	Chinedu Ede (from MSV Duisburg)

Out:

No.	Pos.	Nation	Player

=== Fortuna Düsseldorf ===
In:

No.	Pos.	Nation	Player
16	FW	GER	Torsten Oehrl (on loan from SV Werder Bremen)
—	MF	POL	Adam Matuszczyk (on loan from 1.FC Köln)

Out:

No.	Pos.	Nation	Player
14	MF	GER	Oliver Hampel (to Sportfreunde Lotte)

=== SC Paderborn 07 ===
In:

No.	Pos.	Nation	Player

Out:

No.	Pos.	Nation	Player
10	FW	TUR	Sercan Güvenisik (to Preußen Münster)

== See also ==
- 2009–10 Bundesliga
- 2009–10 2. Bundesliga
- List of German football transfers summer 2009
