= 2007–08 FC Hansa Rostock season =

FC Hansa Rostock
2007–08 season
- Manager: Frank Pagelsdorf
- Stadium: DKB-Arena
- Bundesliga: 17th (relegated)
- DFB-Pokal: Third round

During the 2007–08 German football season, FC Hansa Rostock competed in the Bundesliga.

== Season summary ==
Hansa were relegated after one season back in the Bundesliga. As of 2021, it remains their last top-flight season to date.

== Players ==
=== First-team squad ===
Squad at end of season

Note: Flags indicate national team as defined under FIFA eligibility rules; some limited exceptions apply. Players may hold more than one non-FIFA nationality.

No.	Pos.	Nation	Player
1	GK	GER	Stefan Wächter
2	DF	GER	Dexter Langen
3	DF	USA	Heath Pearce
4	DF	BRA	Orestes
5	DF	GER	Benjamin Lense
7	MF	GER	René Rydlewicz
8	MF	MNE	Đorđije Ćetković
9	FW	GER	Enrico Kern
10	MF	TUR	Zafer Yelen (Note: Yelen was born in West Berlin, West Germany (now Berlin, Germany), but also qualified to represent Turkey internationally and represented Turkey at U-21 level.)
11	MF	GER	Sebastian Hähnge
12	MF	GER	Marc Stein
13	DF	GER	Tim Sebastian
14	MF	CAN	Ryan Gyaki
15	DF	GER	Christian Rahn
16	DF	COD	Assani Lukimya-Mulongoti

No.	Pos.	Nation	Player
17	MF	GER	Tobias Rathgeb
18	FW	IRN	Amir Shapourzadeh
20	FW	FRA	Régis Dorn
21	GK	GER	Jörg Hahnel
22	MF	GER	Stefan Beinlich
23	DF	BRA	Diego Morais
25	MF	GER	Simon Tüting
26	FW	COD	Addy-Waku Menga
27	MF	GER	Fin Bartels
28	FW	NGA	Victor Agali
30	GK	GER	Perry Bräutigam
31	DF	GER	Kai Bülow
32	MF	GER	Sebastian Albert
33	DF	BRA	Gledson
35	GK	USA	Kenneth Kronholm

=== Left club during season ===
Note: Flags indicate national team as defined under FIFA eligibility rules; some limited exceptions apply. Players may hold more than one non-FIFA nationality.

No. / Pos. / Nation / Player; 24 / FW / GER / Marcel Schied (to Carl Zeiss Jena)	No. / Pos. / Nation / Player; 29 / GK / GER / Patric Klandt (to FSV Frankfurt)

== Transfers ==
=== FC Hansa Rostock ===
In:

No.	Pos.	Nation	Player
—	DF	USA	Heath Pearce (from FC Nordsjælland, 16 July)
—	DF	BRA	Orestes (from Naval)
—	FW	COD	Addy-Waku Menga (from VfL Osnabrück)
—	DF	GER	Benjamin Lense (from VfL Bochum)
—	DF	BRA	Diego Morais Pacheco (from Villa Rio)
—	MF	GER	Fin Bartels (from Holstein Kiel)
—	MF	CAN	Ryan Gyaki (from Sheffield United)
—	MF	GER	Simon Tüting (from VfL Osnbrück II)
—	GK	GER	Stefan Wächter (from Hamburger SV)
—	FW	NGA	Victor Agali (Ankaragücü, free)
—	DF	BRA	Gledson (VfB Stuttgart, 3 January)

Out:

No.	Pos.	Nation	Player
—	MF	GER	Michael Hartmann (to F.C. Hansa Rostock II)
—	MF	GER	Anton Müller (to Chemnitzer FC)
—	DF	GER	Martin Pohl (to FC Rot-Weiß Erfurt)
—	DF	BRA	Gledson (to VfB Stuttgart)
—	GK	GER	Mathias Schober (to FC Schalke 04)
—	DF	DEN	Kim Madsen (to Aarhus GF)
—	MF	GER	Kevin Hansen (to FC Erzgebirge Aue)
—	MF	GER	Maik Wagefeld (to Dynamo Dresden)
