= 2015–16 Regionalliga =

8th season of the Regionalliga

Regionalliga
- Season: 2015–16
- Champions: VfL Wolfsburg II (Nord); FSV Zwickau (Nordost); Sportfreunde Lotte (West); SV Waldhof Mannheim (Südwest); SSV Jahn Regensburg (Bayern)
- Promoted: FSV Zwickau; Sportfreunde Lotte; SSV Jahn Regensburg
- Relegated: Goslarer SC 08; BV Cloppenburg; TSV Schilksee; FC Kray; FC Wegberg-Beeck; SV Saar 05 Saarbrücken; FSV Optik Rathenow; VfB Germania Halberstadt; Bahlinger SC; SSVg Velbert; TuS Erndtebrück; SpVgg Neckarelz; SV Spielberg; SC Freiburg II; Viktoria Aschaffenburg; FC Amberg; TSV Rain am Lech

The 2015–16 Regionalliga was the eighth season of the Regionalliga, the fourth under the new format, as the fourth tier of the German football league system. The champions of Regionalliga Nord – SV Werder Bremen II, the champions of the Regionalliga Nordost – 1. FC Magdeburg, and the champions of Regionalliga Bayern – Würzburger Kickers were promoted to the 3. Liga. Borussia Dortmund II, SpVgg Unterhaching and SSV Jahn Regensburg were relegated from 3. Liga.

== Regionalliga Nord ==
18 teams from the states of Bremen, Hamburg, Lower Saxony and Schleswig-Holstein competed in the fourth season of the reformed Regionalliga Nord. 15 teams were retained from the last season and 3 teams were promoted from the Oberliga – Niedersachsenliga champions SV Drochtersen/Assel and the two Regionalliga North promotion playoff winners VfV 06 Hildesheim, Niedersachsenliga runners-up, and TSV Schilksee, Schleswig-Holstein-Liga champions.

Pos	Team	Pld	W	D	L	GF	GA	GD	Pts	Qualification or relegation
1	VfL Wolfsburg II (C)	34	25	4	5	87	24	+63	79	Qualification to promotion play-offs
2	VfB Oldenburg	34	22	8	4	65	21	+44	74	
3	ETSV Weiche	34	17	13	4	57	29	+28	64	
4	SV Drochtersen/Assel	34	18	8	8	46	31	+15	62	
5	SV Meppen	34	16	7	11	57	42	+15	55	
6	TSV Havelse	34	13	8	13	48	60	−12	47	
7	VfB Lübeck	34	12	9	13	50	46	+4	45	
8	BSV Schwarz-Weiß Rehden	34	11	12	11	47	45	+2	45	
9	Eintracht Braunschweig II	34	13	6	15	36	37	−1	45	
10	VfV 06 Hildesheim	34	12	8	14	46	50	−4	44	
11	FC Eintracht Norderstedt 03	34	12	8	14	45	53	−8	44	
12	Hannover 96 II	34	10	12	12	52	46	+6	42	
13	Lüneburger SK Hansa	34	10	11	13	49	51	−2	41	
14	Hamburger SV II	34	9	14	11	43	49	−6	41	
15	FC St. Pauli II	34	11	8	15	43	58	−15	41	
16	Goslarer SC 08 (Note: Goslarer SC 08 did not apply for an Oberliga licence for 2016–17 and was relegated to the tier six Landesliga instead.) (R)	34	11	6	17	38	56	−18	39	Relegation to Landesliga
17	BV Cloppenburg (R)	34	4	11	19	27	66	−39	23	Relegation to Oberliga
18	TSV Schilksee (R)	34	1	5	28	21	93	−72	8	Relegation to Oberliga

Source: kicker.de, soccerway.com
Rules for classification: 1) Points; 2) Goal difference; 3) Goals scored
(C) Champions; (R) Relegated

=== Top goalscorers ===
The top scorers of the league:

Rank	Player	Club	Goals
1	(Austria) Dino Međedović	VfL Wolfsburg II	23
2	(Germany) Kwasi Okyere Wriedt	Lüneburger SK Hansa	22
3	(Germany) Roman Prokoph	Hannover 96 II	18
4	(Democratic Republic of the Congo) Kifuta Makangu	VfB Oldenburg	16
4	(Germany) Muhamed Alawie	SV Meppen	16
4	(Germany) Deniz Undav	TSV Havelse	16

== Regionalliga Nordost ==
18 teams from the states of Berlin, Brandenburg, Mecklenburg-Vorpommern, Saxony, Saxony-Anhalt and Thuringia competed in the fourth season of the reformed Regionalliga Nordost. 13 teams were retained from the last season and 5 teams that were promoted from the Oberliga. The league expanded to 18 teams from 16 as no other teams were relegated to Oberliga because of Union Berlin II's withdrawal and insolvency-stricken VFC Plauen's administrative relegation. FSV Optik Rathenow qualified by winning the NOFV-Oberliga Nord along with runners-up FC Schönberg 95, while RB Leipzig II also qualified by winning NOFV-Oberliga Süd along with runners-up FC Oberlausitz Neugersdorf. FSV 63 Luckenwalde of the northern division won the promotion playoff between the third placers of the two NOFV-Oberliga divisions.

Pos	Team	Pld	W	D	L	GF	GA	GD	Pts	Qualification or relegation
1	FSV Zwickau (C, P)	34	24	5	5	77	30	+47	77	Qualification to promotion play-offs
2	Berliner AK 07	34	23	8	3	68	22	+46	77	
3	FSV Wacker 90 Nordhausen	34	17	10	7	59	39	+20	61	
4	BFC Dynamo	34	17	5	12	66	48	+18	56	
5	FC Oberlausitz Neugersdorf	34	15	9	10	52	48	+4	54	
6	SV Babelsberg 03	34	13	14	7	49	29	+20	53	
7	FC Carl Zeiss Jena	34	15	8	11	43	33	+10	53	
8	TSG Neustrelitz	34	15	6	13	53	42	+11	51	
9	VfB Auerbach	34	14	8	12	52	44	+8	50	
10	Hertha BSC II	34	13	9	12	52	59	−7	48	
11	RB Leipzig II	34	12	8	14	49	48	+1	44	
12	FC Viktoria 1889 Berlin	34	9	11	14	46	62	−16	38	
13	FSV Budissa Bautzen	34	8	13	13	46	47	−1	37	
14	ZFC Meuselwitz	34	10	7	17	34	59	−25	37	
15	FC Schönberg 95	34	9	9	16	37	52	−15	36	
16	FSV 63 Luckenwalde	34	9	2	23	33	80	−47	29	
17	VfB Germania Halberstadt (R)	34	6	5	23	39	80	−41	23	Relegation to Oberliga
18	FSV Optik Rathenow (R)	34	5	7	22	33	66	−33	22	Relegation to Oberliga

Source: kicker.de, soccerway.com
Rules for classification: 1) Points; 2) Goal difference; 3) Goals scored
(C) Champions; (P) Promoted; (R) Relegated

=== Top goalscorers ===
The top scorers of the league:

Rank	Player	Club	Goals
1	(Germany) Andis Shala	SV Babelsberg 03	15
1	(Germany) Jonas Nietfeld	FSV Zwickau	15
1	(Germany) Marc Zimmermann	FSV Zwickau	15
4	(Germany) Paul Walther	FSV Budissa Bautzen	14
4	(Germany) Henry Haufei	FC Schönberg 95	14
6	(Czech Republic) Josef Němec	FC Oberlausitz	13

== Regionalliga West ==
19 teams from North Rhine-Westphalia competed in the fourth season of the reformed Regionalliga West; 14 teams were retained from the last season. FC Wegberg-Beeck won Oberliga Mittelrhein and SSVg Velbert the Oberliga Niederrhein. TuS Erndtebrück won the Oberliga Westfalen while Rot-Weiss Ahlen qualified as runners-up. Borussia Dortmund II was relegated from 3. Liga.

Pos	Team	Pld	W	D	L	GF	GA	GD	Pts	Qualification or relegation
1	Sportfreunde Lotte (C, P)	36	25	8	3	67	23	+44	83	Qualification to promotion play-offs and DFB-Pokal play-off
2	Borussia Mönchengladbach II	36	19	11	6	80	46	+34	68	
3	FC Viktoria Köln	36	17	12	7	66	36	+30	63	
4	Borussia Dortmund II	36	17	9	10	57	36	+21	60	
5	Rot-Weiß Oberhausen	36	17	8	11	58	44	+14	59	
6	Fortuna Düsseldorf II	36	17	8	11	63	51	+12	59	
7	Alemannia Aachen	36	17	5	14	52	43	+9	56	
8	SG Wattenscheid 09	36	15	10	11	61	52	+9	55	
9	FC Schalke 04 II	36	13	12	11	44	44	0	51	
10	SC Verl	36	14	9	13	43	46	−3	51	
11	SC Wiedenbrück	36	13	11	12	50	45	+5	50	
12	Rot-Weiss Essen	36	12	12	12	48	49	−1	48	
13	Rot Weiss Ahlen	36	13	7	16	56	60	−4	46	
14	SV Rödinghausen	36	9	16	11	43	42	+1	43	
15	1. FC Köln II	36	10	11	15	44	51	−7	41	
16	SSVg Velbert (R)	36	9	9	18	38	65	−27	36	Relegation to Oberliga
17	TuS Erndtebrück (R)	36	8	8	20	42	68	−26	32	Relegation to Oberliga
18	FC Kray (R)	36	2	12	22	36	81	−45	18	Relegation to Oberliga
19	FC Wegberg-Beeck (R)	36	4	4	28	30	96	−66	16	Relegation to Oberliga

Source: kicker.de, soccerway.com
Rules for classification: 1) Points; 2) Goal difference; 3) Goals scored
(C) Champions; (P) Promoted; (R) Relegated

=== Westphalia DFB-Pokal play-off ===
As the Westphalian Football and Athletics Association is one of three regional associations with the most participating teams in their league competitions, they were allowed to enter a second team for the 2016–17 DFB-Pokal (in addition to the Westphalian Cup winners). A play-off took place between the best-placed eligible (non-reserve) Westphalian team of the Regionalliga West, Sportfreunde Lotte, and the best-placed eligible team of the 2015–16 Oberliga Westfalen, Sportfreunde Siegen, with the winners qualifying for the DFB-Pokal.

5 June 2016
15:00 CEST

Sportfreunde Lotte	2–0	Sportfreunde Siegen
Tankulić 26'; Freiberger 67'	Report

Sportpark am Lotter Kreuz, Lotte
Attendance: 1,300
Referee: Fabian Maibaum

=== Top goalscorers ===
The top scorers of the league:

Rank	Player	Club	Goals
1	(Germany) Marlon Ritter	Borussia Mönchengladbach II	23
2	(Germany) Kamil Bednarski	SC Wiedenbrück	19
3	(Germany) Hamadi Al Ghaddioui	SC Verl	17
4	(Germany) Güngör Kaya	SG Wattenscheid 09	16
4	(Germany) Kamil Bednarski	SC Wiedenbrück	16
6	(Germany) Marvin Ducksch	Borussia Dortmund II	15
6	(Germany) Kevin Freiberger	Sportfreunde Lotte	15

== Regionalliga Südwest ==
18 teams from Baden-Württemberg, Hesse, Rhineland-Palatinate and Saarland competed in the fourth season of the Regionalliga Südwest. 14 teams were retained from last season and 4 teams were promoted from the Oberliga: SV Spielberg won the Oberliga Baden-Württemberg, Saar 05 Saarbrücken the Oberliga Rheinland-Pfalz/Saar and TSV Steinbach the Hessenliga. The second-placed teams of the other Oberligas had play-off matches which was won by Bahlinger SC.

Pos	Team	Pld	W	D	L	GF	GA	GD	Pts	Qualification or relegation
1	SV Waldhof Mannheim (C)	34	22	7	5	64	19	+45	73	Qualification to promotion play-offs
2	SV Elversberg	34	22	6	6	69	28	+41	72	Qualification to promotion play-offs
3	TSG 1899 Hoffenheim II	34	20	6	8	77	39	+38	66	
4	Kickers Offenbach	34	19	7	8	67	49	+18	64	
5	SV Eintracht Trier 05	34	19	6	9	62	33	+29	63	
6	FC 08 Homburg	34	17	8	9	59	42	+17	59	
7	1. FC Saarbrücken	34	15	9	10	48	36	+12	54	
8	KSV Hessen Kassel	34	14	11	9	42	32	+10	53	
9	Wormatia Worms	34	15	3	16	54	54	0	48	
10	1. FC Kaiserslautern II	34	10	13	11	47	42	+5	43	
11	FC Astoria Walldorf	34	12	6	16	46	53	−7	42	
12	TSV Steinbach	34	11	9	14	36	56	−20	42	
13	FK Pirmasens	34	11	6	17	43	43	0	39	
14	Bahlinger SC (R)	34	9	10	15	45	58	−13	37	Relegation to Oberliga
15	SC Freiburg II (R)	34	9	7	18	50	60	−10	34	Relegation to Oberliga
16	SV Spielberg (R)	34	7	5	22	28	70	−42	26	Relegation to Oberliga
17	SpVgg Neckarelz (Note: SpVgg Neckarelz did not apply for a licence for the 2016–17 Regionalliga season and was relegated.) (R)	34	6	8	20	32	76	−44	26	Relegation to Oberliga
18	SV Saar 05 Saarbrücken (R)	34	2	5	27	21	100	−79	11	Relegation to Oberliga

Source: kicker.de, soccerway.com
Rules for classification: 1) Points; 2) Goal difference; 3) Goals scored
(C) Champions; (R) Relegated

=== Top goalscorers ===
The top scorers of the league:

Rank	Player	Club	Goals
1	(Netherlands) Mijo Tunjic	SV Elversberg	21
2	(Germany) Florian Treske	Wormatia Worms	18
3	(Germany) Felix Lohkemper	TSG 1899 Hoffenheim II	17
4	(Germany) Jannik Sommer	Waldhof Mannheim	16
5	(Germany) Robert Glatzel	1. FC Kaiserslautern II	15

== Regionalliga Bayern ==
18 teams from Bavaria competed in the fourth season of the Regionalliga Bayern. 13 teams were retained from the last season. SpVgg Unterhaching and SSV Jahn Regensburg were relegated from the 3. Liga. 3 teams were promoted from the Bayernliga. Viktoria Aschaffenburg won Bayernliga Nord, TSV Rain 1896 the Bayernliga Süd, and FC Amberg won the promotion play-off.

Pos	Team	Pld	W	D	L	GF	GA	GD	Pts	Qualification or relegation
1	SSV Jahn Regensburg (C, P)	34	19	7	8	61	36	+25	64	Qualification to promotion play-offs and DFB-Pokal
2	SV Wacker Burghausen	34	19	6	9	58	33	+25	63	
3	1. FC Nürnberg II	34	19	6	9	57	37	+20	63	
4	SpVgg Unterhaching	34	15	11	8	59	32	+27	56	
5	FV Illertissen	34	14	11	9	53	49	+4	53	
6	FC Bayern Munich II	34	14	10	10	54	38	+16	52	
7	SpVgg Bayreuth	34	13	10	11	52	57	−5	49	
8	TSV Buchbach	34	12	12	10	43	46	−3	48	
9	SpVgg Greuther Fürth II	34	13	8	13	53	56	−3	47	
10	TSV 1860 München II	34	11	13	10	48	38	+10	46	
11	FC Ingolstadt 04 II	34	11	13	10	55	54	+1	46	
12	FC Memmingen	34	12	6	16	52	60	−8	42	
13	SV Schalding-Heining	34	11	7	16	40	62	−22	40	
14	1. FC Schweinfurt 05	34	8	14	12	44	52	−8	38	
15	Viktoria Aschaffenburg (R)	34	8	11	15	49	63	−14	35	Qualification to relegation play-offs
16	FC Augsburg II	34	7	12	15	52	63	−11	33	Qualification to relegation play-offs
17	FC Amberg (R)	34	6	11	17	36	57	−21	29	Relegation to Bayernliga
18	TSV Rain am Lech (R)	34	7	6	21	44	77	−33	27	Relegation to Bayernliga

Source: kicker.de, soccerway.com
Rules for classification: 1) Points; 2) Goal difference; 3) Goals scored
(C) Champions; (P) Promoted; (R) Relegated

=== Top goalscorers ===
The top scorers of the league:

Rank	Player	Club	Goals
1	(Germany) Markus Ziereis	Jahn Regensburg	19
2	(Germany) Stefan Maderer	SpVgg Greuther Fürth II	18
3	(Tunisia) Sammy Ammari	FC Ingolstadt 04 II	17
4	(Germany) Karl-Heinz Lappe	FC Bayern Munich II	15
5	(Germany) Ardian Morina	FV Illertissen	14

== Promotion play-offs ==
The draw for the 2015–16 promotion play-offs was held on 3 April, with another draw between the Regionalliga Südwest teams held on 21 May 2016.

=== Summary ===
The first legs were played on 25 May, and the second legs were played on 29 May 2016.

Team 1	Agg.	Team 2	1st leg	2nd leg
VfL Wolfsburg II (N)	1–2	Jahn Regensburg (B)	1–0	0–2
SV Elversberg (S2)	1–2	FSV Zwickau (NO)	1–1	0–1
Sportfreunde Lotte (W)	2–0	Waldhof Mannheim (S1)	0–0	2–0

=== Matches ===
All times Central European Summer Time (UTC+2)

25 May 2016
19:00

VfL Wolfsburg II	1–0	Jahn Regensburg
Pläschke 13'	Report

AOK-Stadion, Wolfsburg
Attendance: 4,653
Referee: Martin Thomsen
29 May 2016
13:30

Jahn Regensburg	2–0	VfL Wolfsburg II
Geipl 53' (pen.); Pusch 57'	Report

Continental Arena, Regensburg
Attendance: 14,189
Referee: Martin Petersen

Jahn Regensburg won 2–1 on aggregate.

25 May 2016
19:00

SV Elversberg	1–1	FSV Zwickau
Oesterhelweg 66'	Report	Mai 68'

Ursapharm-Arena an der Kaiserlinde, Spiesen-Elversberg
Attendance: 6,000
Referee: Christian Dietz
29 May 2016
15:05

FSV Zwickau	1–0	SV Elversberg
Wachsmuth 79'	Report

Sternquell-Arena, Plauen
Attendance: 4,775
Referee: Benjamin Cortus

FSV Zwickau won 2–1 on aggregate.

25 May 2016
19:15

Sportfreunde Lotte	0–0	Waldhof Mannheim
	Report

Sportpark am Lotter Kreuz, Lotte
Attendance: 5,373
Referee: René Rohde
29 May 2016
15:05

Waldhof Mannheim	0–2	Sportfreunde Lotte
	Report	Granatowski 25'; Rosinger 26'

Carl-Benz-Stadion, Mannheim
Attendance: 22,371
Referee: Harm Osmers

Sportfreunde Lotte won 2–0 on aggregate.
