= 2006–07 Regionalliga =

13th season of the Regionalliga as a third-level league

Regionalliga
- Season: 2006–07
- Promoted: FC St. Pauli; VfL Osnabrück; SV Wehen; TSG 1899 Hoffenheim
- Relegated: Holstein Kiel; Borussia Mönchengladbach II; Bayer Leverkusen II; Hertha BSC II; SV Wilhelmshaven; 1. FC Saarbrücken; SV Darmstadt 98; FK Pirmasens; 1. FC Kaiserslautern II

The 2006–07 Regionalliga season was the thirteenth season of the Regionalliga at tier three of the German football league system. It was contested in two geographical divisions with eighteen teams in the south and nineteen in the north. The champions, FC St. Pauli and SV Wehen, and the runners-up, VfL Osnabrück and TSG 1899 Hoffenheim, of every division were promoted to the 2. Bundesliga.

== North ==
Pos	Team	Pld	W	D	L	GF	GA	GD	Pts	Promotion or relegation
1	FC St. Pauli (C, P)	36	17	12	7	52	32	+20	63	Promotion to 2. Bundesliga
2	VfL Osnabrück (P)	36	17	10	9	59	43	+16	61	Promotion to 2. Bundesliga
3	1. FC Magdeburg	36	16	12	8	52	41	+11	60	
4	Kickers Emden	36	16	11	9	50	41	+9	59	
5	Wuppertaler SV Borussia	36	16	9	11	59	49	+10	57	
6	Hamburger SV II	36	15	11	10	56	46	+10	56	
7	Dynamo Dresden	36	16	7	13	54	45	+9	55	
8	SV Werder Bremen II	36	15	7	14	53	47	+6	52	
9	VfB Lübeck	36	15	6	15	53	43	+10	51	
10	Fortuna Düsseldorf	36	13	12	11	50	47	+3	51	
11	Rot-Weiß Erfurt	36	13	11	12	41	44	−3	50	
12	1. FC Union Berlin	36	13	9	14	45	39	+6	48	
13	Rot-Weiß Ahlen	36	13	9	14	48	52	−4	48	
14	Borussia Dortmund II	36	14	6	16	42	47	−5	48	
15	Holstein Kiel (R)	36	13	9	14	42	52	−10	48	Relegation to Oberliga
16	Borussia Mönchengladbach II (R)	36	9	8	19	45	62	−17	35	Relegation to Oberliga
17	Bayer Leverkusen II (R)	36	8	10	18	40	58	−18	34	Relegation to Oberliga
18	Hertha BSC II (R)	36	8	8	20	31	55	−24	32	Relegation to Oberliga
19	SV Wilhelmshaven (R)	36	7	9	20	40	69	−29	30	Relegation to Oberliga

Source: Weltfussball.de
Rules for classification: 1) points; 2) goal difference; 3) number of goals scored.
(C) Champions; (P) Promoted; (R) Relegated

=== Results ===
Home \ Away	STP	OSN	MAG	EMD	WUP	HSV	DRE	BRE	LÜB	DÜS	ERF	BER	AHL	DOR	KIE	MÖN	LEV	HER	WIL
FC St. Pauli		2–2	2–0	2–0	1–1	0–0	2–2	2–1	2–1	2–0	1–1	0–0	3–0	2–1	2–0	1–0	2–0	3–0	2–0
VfL Osnabrück	0–0		1–1	2–2	1–1	5–1	3–1	0–0	3–2	1–0	4–0	1–0	2–1	1–1	3–2	1–0	3–3	2–0	2–0
1. FC Magdeburg	1–1	2–0		1–1	1–0	0–0	1–0	2–0	0–2	2–2	1–0	3–1	0–2	2–2	0–0	3–0	1–1	2–0	3–0
Kickers Emden	1–1	1–1	4–2		3–1	2–0	1–0	4–2	0–1	1–0	1–0	2–1	3–0	3–2	0–0	1–1	3–1	1–0	1–3
Wuppertaler SV Borussia	3–1	3–1	1–3	2–4		0–3	3–1	2–0	1–1	1–1	3–1	2–1	3–0	2–1	1–1	0–3	2–0	1–3	5–2
Hamburger SV II	0–0	4–2	1–1	1–0	1–4		1–0	0–3	1–0	1–1	0–0	0–0	3–4	2–0	0–0	1–2	4–1	4–1	3–1
Dynamo Dresden	3–0	0–1	2–1	3–0	1–1	2–4		1–4	2–0	0–0	2–1	2–0	2–1	2–1	4–1	1–0	4–1	2–0	3–1
SV Werder Bremen II	0–2	3–1	2–2	2–1	1–2	3–1	1–1		2–0	2–0	0–1	3–2	0–2	0–1	2–3	2–0	1–0	0–1	2–1
VfB Lübeck	1–0	2–0	0–1	4–1	5–0	1–4	1–0	0–2		2–3	0–2	0–1	2–1	1–3	1–1	4–2	1–0	4–0	6–0
Fortuna Düsseldorf	2–0	2–0	3–1	1–1	1–3	3–2	1–1	2–2	2–1		3–2	2–1	0–3	4–0	2–0	4–1	1–1	0–2	1–1
Rot-Weiß Erfurt	0–3	1–2	2–2	1–1	0–0	0–3	0–2	1–1	2–0	1–1		1–0	1–1	0–1	0–1	1–0	3–2	2–1	1–0
1. FC Union Berlin	2–0	2–2	1–2	1–0	0–3	0–1	2–1	0–2	1–1	1–0	2–4		1–1	2–0	0–2	3–1	4–0	2–2	2–0
Rot-Weiß Ahlen	1–1	0–3	2–1	1–1	1–1	1–2	3–0	2–0	1–3	4–1	2–2	0–1		0–2	1–0	0–3	1–1	1–1	1–0
Borussia Dortmund II	0–1	1–0	1–3	0–0	1–0	1–2	2–3	1–0	1–1	1–0	0–1	1–1	1–2		2–0	2–1	2–0	1–1	2–1
Holstein Kiel	1–2	2–0	5–0	0–0	1–1	1–0	1–0	2–2	1–1	2–0	0–2	0–4	2–1	5–1		2–3	0–3	1–0	3–1
Borussia Mönchengladbach II	1–5	0–4	1–2	2–3	2–1	1–1	1–2	2–3	1–1	1–1	0–1	0–3	2–2	2–1	6–1		1–1	1–1	0–0
Bayer Leverkusen II	2–1	1–2	1–1	0–1	0–3	2–1	3–2	3–3	0–1	1–3	0–0	0–0	0–1	2–0	4–0	2–0		2–1	1–1
Hertha BSC II	3–0	1–3	0–2	0–1	0–1	1–1	1–1	0–1	1–0	1–2	1–1	0–3	0–3	0–3	3–0	0–2	2–0		2–2
SV Wilhelmshaven	3–3	1–0	0–2	2–1	2–1	3–3	1–1	2–1	1–3	1–1	3–5	0–0	4–1	0–2	0–1	1–2	2–1	0–1	

Legend: Blue = home team win; Yellow = draw; Red = away team win.

=== Top goal scorers ===
Pl.	Player	Team	Goals
1	(Italy) Massimo Cannizzaro	Hamburger SV II	17
1	(Germany) Thomas Reichenberger	VfL Osnabrück	17
3	(Democratic Republic of the Congo) Addy-Waku Menga	VfL Osnabrück	15
4	(Germany) René Schnitzler	Borussia Mönchengladbach II	14
5	(Czech Republic) Pavel Dobrý	Holstein Kiel	13
6	(Germany) Kevin Artmann	Werder Bremen II	12
6	(Germany) Gaetano Manno	Wuppertaler SV Borussia	12
6	(Serbia) Radovan Vujanović	Kickers Emden	12
9	(Algeria) Karim Benyamina	1. FC Union Berlin	11
9	(Germany) Alexander Ludwig	Dynamo Dresden	11
9	(Germany) Lars Toborg	Rot Weiss Ahlen	11

== South ==
Pos	Team	Pld	W	D	L	GF	GA	GD	Pts	Promotion or relegation
1	SV Wehen (C, P)	34	21	9	4	58	25	+33	72	Promotion to 2. Bundesliga
2	TSG 1899 Hoffenheim (P)	34	20	8	6	62	31	+31	68	Promotion to 2. Bundesliga
3	VfB Stuttgart II	34	15	8	11	47	42	+5	53	
4	Stuttgarter Kickers	34	14	9	11	51	41	+10	51	
5	FC Ingolstadt 04	34	13	12	9	45	39	+6	51	
6	VfR Aalen	34	12	13	9	51	46	+5	49	
7	SC Pfullendorf	34	13	8	13	45	46	−1	47	
8	FC Bayern Munich II	34	11	13	10	41	37	+4	46	
9	SV Elversberg	34	12	10	12	51	54	−3	46	
10	KSV Hessen Kassel	34	13	7	14	45	56	−11	46	
11	SSV Reutlingen	34	10	15	9	31	37	−6	45	
12	Sportfreunde Siegen	34	12	8	14	53	49	+4	44	
13	TSV 1860 Munich II	34	9	16	9	54	47	+7	43	
14	Karlsruher SC II	34	10	13	11	44	44	0	43	
15	1. FC Saarbrücken (R)	34	10	12	12	52	50	+2	42	Relegation to Oberliga
16	SV Darmstadt 98 (R)	34	11	6	17	47	59	−12	39	Relegation to Oberliga
17	FK Pirmasens (R)	34	8	7	19	31	61	−30	31	Relegation to Oberliga
18	1. FC Kaiserslautern II (R)	34	0	10	24	19	63	−44	10	Relegation to Oberliga

Source: Weltfussball.de
Rules for classification: 1) points; 2) goal difference; 3) number of goals scored.
(C) Champions; (P) Promoted; (R) Relegated

=== Results ===
Home \ Away	WEH	HOF	VFB	STU	ING	AAL	PFU	BAY	ELV	KAS	REU	SIE	MUE	KSC	SAR	DAR	PIR	KAI
SV Wehen		2–1	0–0	1–0	2–3	1–1	3–0	1–0	4–2	2–1	0–0	2–1	2–0	1–0	1–0	3–1	5–0	2–1
TSG 1899 Hoffenheim	2–1		1–1	1–1	0–0	1–1	3–1	2–2	1–1	3–1	2–0	4–0	2–2	3–2	4–0	4–2	2–1	2–0
VfB Stuttgart II	1–0	0–3		1–0	0–1	0–3	2–1	4–0	3–1	2–0	0–1	2–1	0–0	0–0	2–0	1–2	2–1	3–2
Stuttgarter Kickers	0–3	3–1	1–1		1–1	4–1	1–2	1–1	2–0	1–3	0–0	0–3	1–0	2–1	1–1	3–0	0–0	3–0
FC Ingolstadt 04	0–2	0–1	2–2	2–4		1–1	1–1	1–0	0–0	2–0	1–2	0–2	3–0	1–1	0–3	2–2	3–1	4–0
VfR Aalen	1–1	0–1	5–2	2–5	0–1		0–1	2–1	1–0	0–2	1–1	3–2	2–2	2–2	2–0	0–0	5–2	2–1
SC Pfullendorf	1–0	0–1	1–0	1–2	2–2	1–2		0–1	1–1	1–2	0–2	1–1	1–1	3–1	2–2	5–2	2–0	3–2
FC Bayern Munich II	0–1	1–0	4–1	1–0	2–1	2–2	1–0		4–4	0–2	3–0	0–1	1–1	1–1	0–0	2–0	1–2	0–0
SV Elversberg	0–3	1–4	2–0	0–2	0–0	0–1	2–3	2–1		2–2	3–1	1–1	2–1	1–0	1–3	2–0	3–2	2–1
KSV Hessen Kassel	3–3	1–0	1–3	2–1	0–5	0–0	0–1	1–1	0–2		0–0	3–3	3–8	3–1	3–0	0–3	2–0	2–0
SSV Reutlingen	0–0	0–2	1–1	0–1	0–1	2–1	0–0	0–2	1–1	2–1		2–0	2–2	3–1	2–1	2–1	0–0	2–0
Sportfreunde Siegen	1–3	1–2	1–2	4–1	0–1	4–3	2–0	0–0	2–2	1–2	3–0		1–2	2–2	2–1	1–2	1–1	2–1
TSV 1860 Munich II	2–2	1–1	1–4	1–1	1–1	1–1	2–0	1–1	2–3	3–0	0–0	3–0		1–1	3–1	2–0	3–0	2–2
Karlsruher SC II	0–1	1–0	1–1	1–0	1–0	0–0	4–1	1–1	4–2	0–1	1–1	0–3	2–1		0–0	3–2	2–2	2–1
1. FC Saarbrücken	2–2	1–3	3–2	3–3	6–0	4–2	2–2	1–0	1–1	2–2	4–0	1–1	5–2	1–0		0–1	4–1	0–0
SV Darmstadt 98	1–2	2–0	2–1	1–3	2–2	0–1	0–1	2–2	1–3	2–1	2–2	2–1	1–0	1–5	4–0		1–2	4–0
FK Pirmasens	0–2	0–3	0–1	2–1	0–1	0–2	1–3	0–2	1–0	2–0	1–1	0–3	0–2	2–2	1–0	3–1		2–0
1. FC Kaiserslautern II	0–0	1–2	0–2	0–2	0–2	1–1	0–3	2–3	1–4	0–1	1–1	0–2	1–1	0–1	0–0	0–0	1–1	

Legend: Blue = home team win; Yellow = draw; Red = away team win.

=== Top goal scorer ===
Pl.	Player	Team	Goals
1	(France) Jonathan Jager	1. FC Saarbrücken	17
1	(Bosnia and Herzegovina) Mirnes Mešić	Stuttgarter Kickers (10)	17
1	(Bosnia and Herzegovina) Mirnes Mešić	TSG Hoffenheim (7)	17
3	(Germany) Thorsten Bauer	KSV Hessen Kassel	16
3	(Germany) Vitus Nagorny	SV Elversberg	16
5	(Turkey) Mahir Sağlık	1. FC Saarbrücken	15
6	(Argentina) Matías Cenci	SV Wehen	14
6	(Spain) Francisco Copado	TSG Hoffenheim	14
8	(Germany) Nico Beigang	SV Darmstadt 98	12
8	(Greece) José Holebas	TSV 1860 München II	12
8	(Germany) Marcus Steegmann	VfR Aalen	12

'II' teams are amateur sides attached to higher league clubs and cannot be promoted above this level, irrespective of their final position.
In the event of a 'II' side finishing in the promotion places, the next club below will instead be promoted.
