= Johannes Walbaum =

German footballer

Personal information
- Date of birth: February 18, 1987 (age 39)
- Place of birth: Neuss, West Germany
- Position: Defender

Team information
- Current team: FC Wegberg-Beeck
- Number: 40

Youth career
- SV Norf
- BV Weckhoven
- ?–2005: Borussia Mönchengladbach

Senior career*
Years	Team	Apps	(Gls)
2005–2008	FC Wegberg-Beeck	92	(31)
2008–2009	Fortuna Düsseldorf	8	(0)
2009–	FC Wegberg-Beeck		
- * Club domestic league appearances and goals as of 15:11, 8 December 2008 (UTC)

Johannes Walbaum (born February 18, 1987, in Neuss) is a German footballer who plays for FC Wegberg-Beeck. He previously played for Fortuna Düsseldorf
