= Philipp Heithölter =

German footballer

Personal information
- Date of birth: 28 August 1982 (age 44)
- Place of birth: Herford, West Germany
- Height: 1.82 m (6 ft 0 in)
- Position: Left midfielder

Youth career
- SV Sundern 08

Senior career*
Years	Team	Apps	(Gls)
–2002	SC Herford		
2002–2003	VfB Fichte Bielefeld		
2003–2005	Arminia Bielefeld	4	(0)
2005–2007	Holstein Kiel	27	(1)
2007–2009	Rot Weiss Ahlen	42	(6)
2009–2011	SC Paderborn	30	(1)
2012–2014	Arminia Bielefeld	14	(1)
- * Club domestic league appearances and goals

Philipp Heithölter (born 28 August 1982) is a German retired footballer who played as a left midfielder.

== Career ==
Heithölter grew up in Herford, where he played for SV Sundern 08 and SC Herford. After one season in the Oberliga Westfalen (IV) with Fichte Bielefeld, he joined then second division club Arminia Bielefeld and appeared in four matches in the 2003–04 season. The following year he played 19 matches for Armenia's second team in the Oberliga. Heithölter has then played for Holstein Kiel and moved after two years to Rot Weiss Ahlen before he signed with SC Paderborn 07 on 15 June 2009.
