= Rico Morack =

German footballer (born 1988)

Personal information
- Date of birth: 18 February 1988 (age 38)
- Place of birth: East Berlin, East Germany
- Height: 1.86 m (6 ft 1 in)
- Position: Central defender

Team information
- Current team: Hertha BSC II
- Number: 13

Youth career
- Turbine Potsdam
- –2003: SV Babelsberg 03
- 2003–2006: Hertha BSC

Senior career*
Years	Team	Apps	(Gls)
2006–2009	Hertha BSC II	54	(3)
2009–2010	TuS Koblenz	6	(0)
2011	Hertha BSC II	13	(0)
2011–2012	SV Babelsberg 03	26	(0)
2012–2014	TSG Neustrelitz	56	(2)
2014–2015	Viktoria Berlin	29	(1)
2015–	Hertha BSC II	109	(5)
- * Club domestic league appearances and goals as of 13 February 2021

Rico Morack (born 18 February 1988) is a German footballer who played in the 2. Bundesliga for TuS Koblenz in the 2009–10 season. In the 2014–15 season he played for Vikotria Berlin. He joined the reserve squad of Hertha BSC on 1 July 2015.
