= Pierre Kleinheider =

German footballer

Personal information
- Date of birth: 7 November 1989 (age 37)
- Place of birth: Offenbach, West Germany
- Height: 1.90 m (6 ft 3 in)
- Position: Goalkeeper

Team information
- Current team: FSV 1926 Fernwald
- Number: 1

Youth career
- SpVgg Dietesheim
- SG Rosenhöhe
- –2008: FSV Mainz 05

Senior career*
Years	Team	Apps	(Gls)
2008–2011	FSV Mainz 05 II	46	(0)
2011–2013	FSV Frankfurt	0	(0)
2013–2016	Hallescher FC	55	(0)
2016	Alemannia Aachen	15	(0)
2016–2017	Chemnitzer FC	0	(0)
2017–2019	SC Hessen Dreieich	31	(0)
2021–	FSV 1926 Fernwald	23	(0)
- * Club domestic league appearances and goals as of 12 November 2022

Pierre Kleinheider (born 7 November 1989) is a German footballer who plays as a goalkeeper for FSV 1926 Fernwald.
