= Marinko Miletić =

German footballer

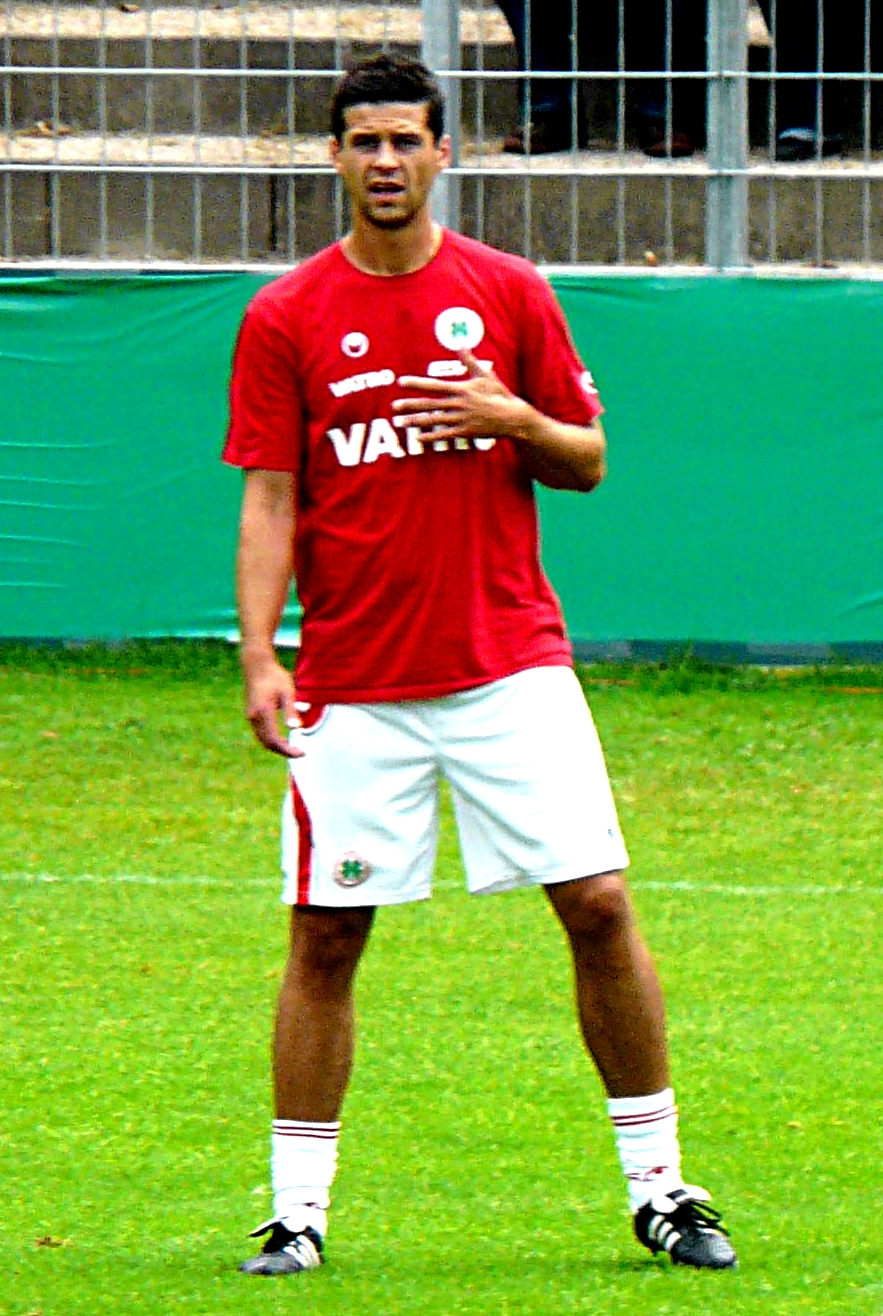
- Miletić with Rot-Weiß Oberhausen

Personal information
- Date of birth: 8 October 1980 (age 46)
- Place of birth: Düsseldorf, West Germany
- Height: 1.96 m (6 ft 5 in)
- Position: Defender

Youth career
- Düsseldorfer SC 99
- –1997: BV 04 Düsseldorf
- 1997–2001: Fortuna Düsseldorf

Senior career*
Years	Team	Apps	(Gls)
2001–2003	Borussia Mönchengladbach II		
2003–2005	FC St. Pauli	17	(0)
2005–2007	FC Gütersloh	49	(5)
2007–2009	Rot Weiss Ahlen	32	(1)
2009–2011	Rot-Weiß Oberhausen	45	(1)
- * Club domestic league appearances and goals

Marinko Miletić (born 8 October 1980) is a German former professional footballer who played as a defender.
