= Michael Schick (footballer) =

German footballer

Personal information
- Date of birth: 29 February 1988 (age 38)
- Place of birth: Bad Cannstatt, West Germany
- Height: 1.79 m (5 ft 10 in)
- Position: Left back

Team information
- Current team: TV Oeffingen

Youth career
- TSV Mühlhausen
- VfB Stuttgart
- –2004: Stuttgarter Kickers
- 2004–2007: TSV 1860 München

Senior career*
Years	Team	Apps	(Gls)
2007–2009	TSV 1860 München II	38	(3)
2009	TSV 1860 München	9	(1)
2009–2010	FC Augsburg	1	(0)
2010–2012	SV Sandhausen	15	(0)
2012–2013	Wacker Burghausen	8	(0)
2014–2015	Kickers Pforzheim	30	(3)
2015–2016	1. FC Bruchsal	29	(3)
2016–2018	SpVgg Ludwigsburg	31	(5)
2018–	TV Oeffingen	61	(14)
- * Club domestic league appearances and goals as of 8 February 2021

Michael Schick (born 29 February 1988, in Bad Cannstatt) is a German footballer who plays for TV Oeffingen.

== Career ==
He made his professional debut in the 2. Bundesliga for 1860 Munich on 1 March 2009 where he started in a game against FC St. Pauli. At the end of the 2008–09 season, Schick transferred to FC Augsburg. He signed a three-year contract, joining the club on 1 July 2009 and left the team after just one year to sign for SV Sandhausen. Two years later he signed for Wacker Burghausen.
