= Jannik Sommer =

German footballer

Personal information
- Date of birth: 13 September 1991 (age 35)
- Place of birth: Darmstadt, Germany
- Height: 1.81 m (5 ft 11 in)
- Position: Left midfielder

Team information
- Current team: Wormatia Worms
- Number: 20

Youth career
- –2010: TS Ober-Roden

Senior career*
Years	Team	Apps	(Gls)
2010–2013	Kickers Offenbach II	69	(27)
2010–2013	Kickers Offenbach	4	(0)
2013–2014	Eintracht Frankfurt II	28	(4)
2014–2015	SVN Zweibrücken	19	(7)
2015	FK Pirmasens	14	(7)
2015–2019	Waldhof Mannheim	119	(35)
2019–2021	FC 08 Homburg	55	(9)
2021–2022	FSV Frankfurt	25	(0)
2022–	Wormatia Worms	16	(2)
- * Club domestic league appearances and goals as of 13 November 2022

Jannik Sommer (born 13 September 1991) is a German footballer who plays for Wormatia Worms.

== Career ==
Sommer began his career with Kickers Offenbach and made his 3. Liga debut for the club in April 2011, as a substitute for Alexander Huber in a 2–0 home win over Wacker Burghausen. He joined Eintracht Frankfurt II in July 2013. In the following season, Sommer transferred to SVN Zweibrücken and then FK Pirmasens after half a season. 1 July 2015, Sommer joined SV Waldhof Mannheim from Primasens.

In his first season with Regionalliga side, SV Waldhof Mannheim, Sommer scored a total of 16 goals, being the fourth highest scorer of the league.
