= René Schnitzler =

German footballer

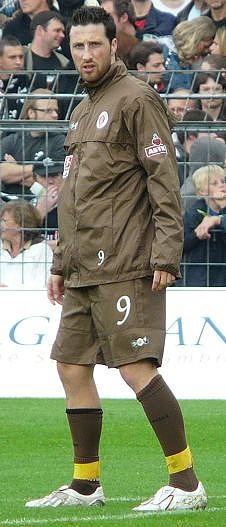

Personal information
- Date of birth: 14 April 1985 (age 41)
- Place of birth: Mönchengladbach, West Germany
- Height: 1.87 m (6 ft 2 in)
- Position: Forward

Youth career
- –1999: Rheydter SV
- 1999–2004: Borussia Mönchengladbach

Senior career*
Years	Team	Apps	(Gls)
2004–2005	Borussia Mönchengladbach II	27	(11)
2005	Bayer 04 Leverkusen II	17	(3)
2006–2007	Borussia Mönchengladbach II	43	(14)
2006–2007	Borussia Mönchengladbach	1	(0)
2007–2009	FC St. Pauli	33	(7)
2007–2009	FC St. Pauli II	4	(0)
2009–2010	FC Wegberg-Beeck		

International career
2005	Germany U-20	3	(0)
- * Club domestic league appearances and goals

René Schnitzler (born 14 April 1985) is a German former professional footballer who played as a forward.

== Career ==
Schnitzler was born in Mönchengladbach. He made his debut on the professional league level in the Bundesliga for Borussia Mönchengladbach on 19 May 2007 when he came on as a substitute in the 57th minute in a game against VfL Bochum.

In 2009, after just one day with Sint-Truiden, he returned to Germany and signed for FC Wegberg-Beeck on a two-year contract. He left the club in December 2010.

In 2011 Schnitzler admitted receiving €100,000 to fix five matches while playing for St. Pauli in 2008. On 19 July 2011, he was banned for 30 months in Germany for his part in fixing five second division matches in 2008.
