= Sebastian Albert =

German footballer (born 1987)

Personal information
- Date of birth: 26 February 1987 (age 39)
- Place of birth: Leipzig, East Germany
- Height: 1.83 m (6 ft 0 in)
- Position: Midfielder

Team information
- Current team: FC Grimma
- Number: 16

Youth career
- 1996–1999: VFK Blau-Weiß Leipzig
- 1999–2001: Sachsen Leipzig
- 2001–2004: VfB Leipzig
- 2004–2006: Hansa Rostock

Senior career*
Years	Team	Apps	(Gls)
2006–2009	Hansa Rostock II	72	(5)
2008–2009	Hansa Rostock	2	(0)
2009–2011	RB Leipzig	16	(1)
2012	Grün-Weiß Piesteritz	7	(0)
2012–2022	ZFC Meuselwitz	226	(14)
2022–	FC Grimma	3	(0)

International career
2005	Germany U-18	2	(0)
2006	Germany U-19	2	(0)
- * Club domestic league appearances and goals as of 12 November 2022

Sebastian Albert (born 26 February 1987) is a German footballer who plays for NOFV-Oberliga Süd club FC Grimma.

== Career ==
He made his professional debut in the 2. Bundesliga with Hansa Rostock on 16 February 2009 when he started a game against SC Freiburg.
