= Daniel Felgenhauer =

German former footballer

Personal information
- Date of birth: 10 May 1976 (age 50)
- Place of birth: Hof, West Germany
- Height: 1.73 m (5 ft 8 in)
- Position: Defender

Team information
- Current team: MSV Duisburg (assistant manager)

Youth career
- –1988: ASGV Döhlau
- 1988–1995: Bayern Hof

Senior career*
Years	Team	Apps	(Gls)
1995–1997	SpVgg Bayern Hof		
1997–2001	Greuther Fürth	109	(16)
2001–2003	Borussia Mönchengladbach	21	(1)
2004–2005	→ LR Ahlen (loan)	49	(6)
2005–2009	Greuther Fürth	88	(4)
2009–2010	Rot Weiss Ahlen	10	(0)
2010–2013	SpVgg Bayern Hof	95	(11)

Managerial career
- 2010: SpVgg Bayern Hof
- 2010: SpVgg Bayern Hof (player-coach)
- 2010–2013: SpVgg Bayern Hof (team-manager)
- 2013–2014: SpVgg Bayern Hof
- 2014–: MSV Duisburg (assistant)
- * Club domestic league appearances and goals

Daniel Felgenhauer (born 10 May 1976) is a German former footballer who is now assistant manager of MSV Duisburg.
