= Diego Morais =

Brazilian footballer (born 1983)

Personal information
- Full name: Diego Morais Pacheco
- Date of birth: 11 February 1983 (age 43)
- Place of birth: Rio de Janeiro, Brazil
- Height: 1.87 m (6 ft 2 in)
- Position: Defender

Senior career*
Years	Team	Apps	(Gls)
2003	Bangu		
2004	Nacional		
2005	Volta Redonda		
2006	Villa Rio		
2007–2009	Hansa Rostock	14	(0)
2010–2011	ASA de Arapiraca		
2011–2014	CFZ do Rio		
- * Club domestic league appearances and goals

Diego Morais Pacheco (born 11 February 1983) is a Brazilian former professional footballer who played as a defender.
