= Güngör Kaya =

Turkish-German footballer

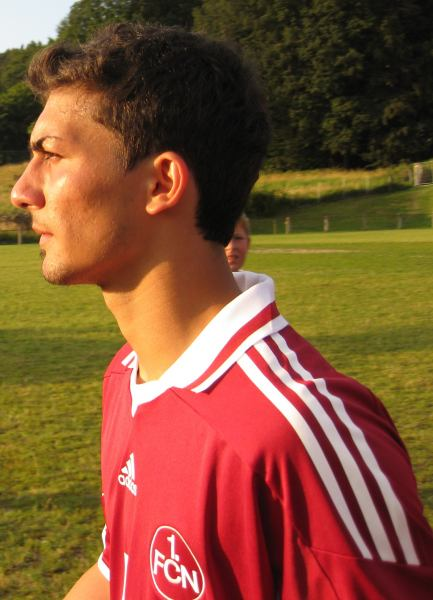
- Kaya with 1. FC Nürnberg

Personal information
- Date of birth: 27 April 1990 (age 36)
- Place of birth: Gelsenkirchen, Germany
- Height: 1.78 m (5 ft 10 in)
- Position: Forward

Team information
- Current team: SV Horst 08

Youth career
- VfL Bochum

Senior career*
Years	Team	Apps	(Gls)
2009–2011	1. FC Nürnberg	0	(0)
2009–2011	1. FC Nürnberg II	22	(5)
2011	VPS	4	(1)
2011–2012	Rot-Weiss Essen	30	(6)
2012	Adanaspor	6	(0)
2013	Eyüpspor	14	(5)
2013–2014	KFC Uerdingen	6	(0)
2014–2016	SG Wattenscheid 09	57	(21)
2016–2017	Rot-Weiß Oberhausen	24	(7)
2017	Fatih Karagümrük	5	(0)
2018	Yeşil Bursa	6	(0)
2018–2019	FSV Duisburg	29	(6)
2019	SG Wattenscheid 09	13	(3)
2020	DJK TuS Hordel		
2021–	SV Horst 08		
- * Club domestic league appearances and goals

Güngör Kaya (born 27 April 1990) is a Turkish-German former professional footballer who plays as a forward for SV Horst 08.

== Career ==
Kaya started his career with German Bundesliga side 1. FC Nürnberg.
