= List of German football transfers summer 2008 =

This is a list of German football transfers in the summer transfer window 2008 by club. Only transfers of the Bundesliga, 2. Bundesliga and 3. Liga are included.

== Bundesliga ==
=== FC Bayern Munich ===
In:

Out:

Note: Flags indicate national team as has been defined under FIFA eligibility rules. Players may hold more than one non-FIFA nationality.

| No. | Pos. | Nation | Player |
|---|---|---|---|
| 22 | GK | GER | Hans-Jörg Butt (from S.L. Benfica) |
| 23 | DF | ITA | Massimo Oddo (on loan from A.C. Milan) |
| 24 | MF | GER | Tim Borowski (from SV Werder Bremen) |
| 35 | GK | GER | Thomas Kraft (from FC Bayern Munich II) |

| No. | Pos. | Nation | Player |
|---|---|---|---|
| 1 | GK | GER | Oliver Kahn (retired) |
| 19 | FW | GER | Jan Schlaudraff (to Hannover 96) |
| 23 | DF | GER | Marcell Jansen (to Hamburger SV) |
| 29 | GK | GER | Bernd Dreher (retired) |
| 36 | MF | GER | Stephan Fürstner (to FC Bayern Munich II) |
| — | MF | PAR | Julio dos Santos (to Clube Atlético Paranaense, previously on loan to Grêmio) |

=== SV Werder Bremen ===
In:

| No. | Pos. | Nation | Player |
|---|---|---|---|
| 15 | DF | AUT | Sebastian Prödl (from SK Sturm Graz) |
| 17 | MF | BIH | Said Husejinović (from FK Sloboda Tuzla) |
| 24 | FW | PER | Claudio Pizarro (on loan from Chelsea F.C.) |
| 27 | DF | GER | Niklas Andersen (from Rot-Weiss Essen) |

Out:

| No. | Pos. | Nation | Player |
|---|---|---|---|
| 5 | DF | CMR | Pierre Womé (to 1. FC Köln) |
| 15 | DF | GER | Patrick Owomoyela (to Borussia Dortmund) |
| 17 | FW | CRO | Ivan Klasnić (to FC Nantes) |
| 24 | MF | GER | Tim Borowski (to FC Bayern Munich) |
| 28 | FW | GER | Kevin Schindler (on loan to F.C. Hansa Rostock) |
| 38 | MF | POR | Amaury Bischoff (to Arsenal F.C.) |
| — | FW | COL | John Mosquera (on loan to SønderjyskE, previously on loan to Alemannia Aachen) |

=== FC Schalke 04 ===
In:

| No. | Pos. | Nation | Player |
|---|---|---|---|
| 17 | FW | PER | Jefferson Farfán (from PSV Eindhoven) |
| 25 | DF | PER | Carlos Augusto Zambrano (from FC Schalke 04 youth) |
| 30 | MF | GEO | Levan Kenia (from FC Schalke 04 youth) |
| 35 | GK | MAR | Mohamed Amsif (from FC Schalke 04 youth) |
| 37 | MF | NED | Orlando Engelaar (from FC Twente) |

Out:

| No. | Pos. | Nation | Player |
|---|---|---|---|
| 4 | DF | GER | Mathias Abel (to 1. FC Kaiserslautern) |
| 9 | FW | DEN | Søren Larsen (to Toulouse FC) |
| 25 | MF | BIH | Zlatan Bajramović (to Eintracht Frankfurt) |
| 26 | MF | GER | Mimoun Azaouagh (to VfL Bochum, previously on loan) |

=== Hamburger SV ===
In:

| No. | Pos. | Nation | Player |
|---|---|---|---|
| 2 | DF | BRA | Alex Silva (from São Paulo FC) |
| 7 | DF | GER | Marcell Jansen (from FC Bayern Munich) |
| 10 | FW | CRO | Mladen Petrić (from Borussia Dortmund) |
| 21 | MF | BFA | Jonathan Pitroipa (from SC Freiburg) |
| 27 | MF | BRA | Thiago Neves (from Fluminense) |
| 40 | MF | GER | Dennis Aogo (from SC Freiburg) |

Out:

| No. | Pos. | Nation | Player |
|---|---|---|---|
| 2 | DF | ARG | Juan Pablo Sorín (to Cruzeiro) |
| 7 | FW | EGY | Mohamed Zidan (to Borussia Dortmund) |
| 10 | DF | BEL | Vincent Kompany (to Manchester City F.C.) |
| 13 | MF | GER | Mario Fillinger (to F.C. Hansa Rostock) |
| 23 | MF | NED | Rafael van der Vaart (to Real Madrid C.F.) |
| 24 | MF | SVN | Mišo Brečko (to 1. FC Köln) |
| 33 | FW | USA | Preston Zimmerman (to Kapfenberger SV) |
| 34 | MF | GER | Sidney Sam (on loan to 1. FC Kaiserslautern) |
| — | FW | GER | Rouwen Hennings (on loan to FC St. Pauli, previously on loan to VfL Osnabrück) |
| — | DF | CZE | Miroslav Štěpánek (on loan to Kapfenberger SV) |

=== VfL Wolfsburg ===
In:

| No. | Pos. | Nation | Player |
|---|---|---|---|
| 2 | DF | ITA | Cristian Zaccardo (from US Palermo) |
| 3 | DF | BRA | Rodrigo Alvim (from Belenenses) |
| 10 | MF | BIH | Zvjezdan Misimović (from 1. FC Nürnberg) |
| 11 | FW | BRA | Caiuby (from AD São Caetano) |
| 15 | MF | GER | Daniel Adlung (from SpVgg Greuther Fürth) |
| 16 | FW | TUR | Mahir Sağlık (from Wuppertaler SV) |
| 19 | MF | ROU | Vlad Munteanu (loan return from AJ Auxerre) |
| 21 | GK | GER | Patrick Platins (loan return from FC Augsburg) |
| 22 | MF | GER | Kevin Wolze (from Bolton Wanderers F.C.) |
| 27 | FW | GER | Alexander Esswein (from 1. FC Kaiserslautern youth) |
| 31 | DF | GER | Bernd Korzynietz (on loan from Arminia Bielefeld) |
| 35 | GK | SUI | Marwin Hitz (from FC St. Gallen, previously on loan to FC Winterthur) |
| 43 | DF | ITA | Andrea Barzagli (from US Palermo) |

Out:

| No. | Pos. | Nation | Player |
|---|---|---|---|
| 2 | DF | ARG | Facundo Hernán Quiroga (to Club Atlético River Plate) |
| 3 | DF | BEL | Peter Van Der Heyden (to 1. FSV Mainz 05) |
| 8 | MF | GER | Daniel Baier (on loan to FC Augsburg) |
| 11 | MF | GER | Alexander Laas (on loan to Arminia Bielefeld) |
| 18 | MF | COD | Cédric Makiadi (on loan to MSV Duisburg) |
| 27 | MF | GUI | Pablo Thiam (retired) |
| 28 | FW | GHA | Isaac Boakye (to 1. FC Nürnberg, previously on loan to 1. FSV Mainz 05) |
| 29 | FW | ROU | Sergiu Radu (on loan to 1. FC Köln, previously on loan to VfB Stuttgart) |
| 30 | MF | ALB | Valdet Rama (to FC Ingolstadt 04) |
| 31 | FW | GER | Emre Öztürk (to SV Sandhausen) |
| 32 | MF | BRA | Marcelinho (to Clube de Regatas do Flamengo) |
| 36 | FW | SEN | Mame Niang (on loan to Viking FK) |
| 40 | FW | SRB | Danijel Ljuboja (loan return to VfB Stuttgart) |
| — | DF | GER | Uwe Möhrle (to FC Augsburg, previously on loan) |

=== VfB Stuttgart ===
In:

| No. | Pos. | Nation | Player |
|---|---|---|---|
| 1 | GK | GER | Jens Lehmann (from Arsenal F.C.) |
| 4 | DF | NED | Khalid Boulahrouz (from Chelsea F.C.) |
| 7 | MF | GER | Martin Lanig (from SpVgg Greuther Fürth) |
| 8 | MF | CZE | Jan Šimák (from FC Carl Zeiss Jena) |
| 16 | MF | GER | Sebastian Rudy (from VfB Stuttgart II) |
| 29 | MF | CMR | Georges Mandjeck (loan return from 1. FC Kaiserslautern) |
| 38 | FW | SRB | Danijel Ljuboja (loan return from VfL Wolfsburg) |

Out:

| No. | Pos. | Nation | Player |
|---|---|---|---|
| 1 | GK | GER | Raphael Schäfer (to 1. FC Nürnberg) |
| 2 | DF | GER | Andreas Beck (to TSG 1899 Hoffenheim) |
| 6 | DF | POR | Fernando Meira (to Galatasaray S.K.) |
| 7 | MF | GER | Silvio Meißner (retired) |
| 25 | MF | BRA | Antônio da Silva (to Karlsruher SC) |
| 26 | MF | SWE | Alexander Farnerud (to Brøndby IF) |
| 31 | FW | GER | Matthias Morys (to Kickers Offenbach) |
| 36 | MF | GER | Peter Perchtold (to 1. FC Nürnberg) |
| 39 | FW | ROU | Sergiu Radu (loan return to VfL Wolfsburg) |
| 40 | MF | GER | Julian Schuster (to SC Freiburg) |
| — | DF | GER | David Pisot (to VfB Stuttgart II, previously on loan to SC Paderborn 07) |

=== Bayer 04 Leverkusen ===
In:

| No. | Pos. | Nation | Player |
|---|---|---|---|
| 3 | DF | BRA | Henrique (on loan from FC Barcelona) |
| 8 | MF | BRA | Renato Augusto (from Flamengo) |
| 9 | FW | GER | Patrick Helmes (from 1. FC Köln) |
| 18 | DF | CIV | Constant Djapka (from Pandurii Târgu Jiu) |
| 24 | DF | CZE | Michal Kadlec (on loan from Sparta Prague) |
| — | DF | BRA | Anderson (from Flamengo) |

Out:

| No. | Pos. | Nation | Player |
|---|---|---|---|
| 8 | MF | GER | Paul Freier (to VfL Bochum) |
| 13 | FW | RUS | Dmitri Bulykin (to R.S.C. Anderlecht) |
| 28 | MF | GER | Carsten Ramelow (retired) |
| 29 | DF | GER | Jan-Ingwer Callsen-Bracker (to Borussia Mönchengladbach) |
| 36 | FW | BIH | Sergej Barbarez (retired) |
| — | DF | BRA | Anderson (on loan to VfL Osnabrück) |
| — | FW | CZE | Michal Papadopulos (to FK Mladá Boleslav, previously on loan to FC Energie Cottbus) |

=== Hannover 96 ===
In:

| No. | Pos. | Nation | Player |
|---|---|---|---|
| 5 | DF | SUI | Mario Eggimann (from Karlsruher SC) |
| 13 | FW | GER | Jan Schlaudraff (from FC Bayern Munich) |
| 27 | GK | GER | Florian Fromlowitz (from 1. FC Kaiserslautern) |
| 28 | DF | GER | Leon Balogun (from Türkiyemspor Berlin) |
| 31 | DF | GER | Tim Hofmann (from Hannover 96 II) |
| 32 | FW | FIN | Mikael Forssell (from Birmingham City F.C.) |

Out:

| No. | Pos. | Nation | Player |
|---|---|---|---|
| 3 | DF | POL | Dariusz Żuraw (to Arka Gdynia) |
| 13 | FW | GER | Thomas Brdarić (retired) |
| 16 | FW | IRN | Vahid Hashemian (to VfL Bochum) |
| 20 | GK | GER | Richard Golz (retired) |
| 21 | FW | GER | Benjamin Lauth (to TSV 1860 Munich) |
| 25 | GK | AUS | Frank Jurić (to Perth Glory FC) |
| 31 | FW | GER | Fabian Montabell (to FC Rot-Weiß Erfurt) |
| 32 | DF | GER | Moritz Marheineke (to VfB Lübeck) |
| 35 | DF | GER | Sören Halfar (to SC Paderborn 07, previously on loan) |
| — | FW | ISL | Gunnar Heiðar Þorvaldsson (to Esbjerg fB, previously on loan to Vålerenga I.F.) |

=== Eintracht Frankfurt ===
In:

| No. | Pos. | Nation | Player |
|---|---|---|---|
| 8 | MF | BIH | Zlatan Bajramović (from Schalke 04) |
| 10 | FW | GRE | Nikos Liberopoulos (from AEK Athens) |
| 11 | MF | AUT | Ümit Korkmaz (from Rapid Wien) |
| 13 | DF | GER | Markus Steinhöfer (from Bayern Munich II, previously on loan to Red Bull Salzburg) |
| 19 | DF | FRA | Habib Bellaïd (from RC Strasbourg) |
| 27 | DF | GER | Alexander Krük (from Kickers Emden) |

Out:

| No. | Pos. | Nation | Player |
|---|---|---|---|
| 8 | FW | GRE | Evangelos Mantzios (loan return to Panathinaikos) |
| 9 | FW | GER | Marcel Heller (on loan to MSV Duisburg) |
| 10 | MF | AUT | Markus Weissenberger (to LASK Linz) |
| 27 | DF | GRE | Sotirios Kyrgiakos (to AEK Athens) |
| 31 | DF | GER | Mounir Chaftar (to MSV Duisburg) |

=== Hertha BSC ===
In:

| No. | Pos. | Nation | Player |
|---|---|---|---|
| 2 | DF | BRA | Kaká (from Académica Coimbra) |
| 7 | MF | BRA | Cícero (on loan from Tombense Futebol Clube) |
| 11 | FW | UKR | Andriy Voronin (on loan from Liverpool) |
| 13 | DF | GER | Marc Stein (from F.C. Hansa Rostock) |
| 15 | DF | BRA | Rodnei (from Clube Atlético Juventus, previously on loan to Jagiellonia Białystok) |
| 23 | FW | BUL | Valeri Domovchiyski (from PFC Levski Sofia, previously on loan) |
| 25 | MF | ROU | Maximilian Nicu (from SV Wehen Wiesbaden) |
| 27 | FW | TUN | Amine Chermiti (from Étoile Sportive du Sahel) |
| 29 | MF | GER | Sascha Bigalke (from Hertha BSC II) |
| 35 | DF | GER | Shervin Radjabali-Fardi (from Hertha BSC youth) |
| 36 | MF | GER | Lennart Hartmann (from Hertha BSC youth) |
| 39 | MF | GER | Florian Riedel (from Hertha BSC youth) |

Out:

| No. | Pos. | Nation | Player |
|---|---|---|---|
| 6 | MF | CZE | Rudolf Skácel (loan return to Southampton F.C.) |
| 7 | MF | BRA | Mineiro (to FC Chelsea) |
| 18 | FW | CRO | Srđan Lakić (to 1. FC Kaiserslautern, previously on loan to Heracles Almelo) |
| 19 | MF | GER | Andreas Schmidt (retired) |
| 21 | FW | NGA | Solomon Okoronkwo (to FC Saturn Moscow Oblast) |
| 22 | MF | SWE | Tobias Grahn (loan return to Gimnàstic de Tarragona) |
| 24 | MF | TUR | Bilal Çubukçu (to Gençlerbirliği S.K.) |
| 27 | DF | GER | Amadeus Wallschläger (to FC Carl Zeiss Jena) |
| 33 | FW | BRA | André Lima (on loan to FC São Paulo) |
| 36 | DF | GER | Pascal Bieler (to 1. FC Nürnberg) |
| 39 | FW | GER | Chinedu Ede (to MSV Duisburg) |
| — | DF | DEN | Dennis Cagara (to FC Nordsjælland, previously on loan) |

=== Karlsruher SC ===
In:

| No. | Pos. | Nation | Player |
|---|---|---|---|
| 5 | DF | GER | Tim Sebastian (from F.C. Hansa Rostock) |
| 25 | MF | BRA | Antônio da Silva (from VfB Stuttgart) |
| 27 | DF | GER | Stefano Celozzi (from FC Bayern Munich II) |

Out:

| No. | Pos. | Nation | Player |
|---|---|---|---|
| 2 | DF | GER | Christopher Reinhard (to FC Ingolstadt 04) |
| 5 | DF | SUI | Mario Eggimann (to Hannover 96) |
| 23 | DF | GER | Florian Dick (to 1. FC Kaiserslautern) |
| 30 | MF | HUN | Tamás Hajnal (to Borussia Dortmund) |

=== VfL Bochum ===
In:

| No. | Pos. | Nation | Player |
|---|---|---|---|
| 1 | GK | POR | Daniel Márcio Fernandes (from PAOK) |
| 6 | MF | AUT | Christian Fuchs (from SV Mattersburg) |
| 7 | MF | GER | Paul Freier (from Bayer 04 Leverkusen) |
| 16 | FW | IRN | Vahid Hashemian (from Hannover 96) |
| 17 | FW | TUR | Sinan Kaloğlu (from Bursaspor) |
| 22 | MF | GER | Mimoun Azaouagh (from FC Schalke 04, previously on loan) |
| 27 | GK | GER | Andreas Lengsfeld (from Jahn Regensburg) |

Out:

| No. | Pos. | Nation | Player |
|---|---|---|---|
| 3 | DF | GER | Martin Meichelbeck (to SpVgg Greuther Fürth) |
| 6 | DF | CZE | Pavel Drsek (to Panionios F.C.) |
| 7 | FW | DEN | Tommy Bechmann (to SC Freiburg) |
| 14 | FW | GER | Benjamin Auer (to Alemannia Aachen) |
| 16 | FW | AUT | Marc Sand (on loan to FK Austria Wien) |
| 17 | FW | UKR | Oleksiy Byelik (loan return to FC Shakhtar Donetsk) |
| 27 | GK | CZE | Jan Laštůvka (loan return to FC Shakhtar Donetsk) |
| — | FW | GER | Thomas Rathgeber (to SpVgg Unterhaching, previously on loan) |

=== Borussia Dortmund ===
In:

| No. | Pos. | Nation | Player |
|---|---|---|---|
| 3 | DF | KOR | Lee Young-Pyo (from Tottenham Hotspur F.C.) |
| 4 | DF | SRB | Neven Subotić (from 1. FSV Mainz 05) |
| 10 | FW | EGY | Mohamed Zidan (from Hamburger SV) |
| 23 | MF | TUR | Nuri Şahin (loan return from Feyenoord) |
| 25 | DF | GER | Patrick Owomoyela (from SV Werder Bremen) |
| 27 | DF | BRA | Felipe Santana (from Figueirense) |
| 29 | DF | GER | Marcel Schmelzer (from Borussia Dortmund II) |
| 30 | MF | HUN | Tamás Hajnal (from Karlsruher SC) |
| 31 | GK | GER | Lukas Kruse (from SC Paderborn) |
| 34 | FW | SRB | Bayram Sadrijaj (from TSG Thannhausen) |

Out:

| No. | Pos. | Nation | Player |
|---|---|---|---|
| 2 | DF | GER | Martin Amedick (to 1. FC Kaiserslautern) |
| 3 | DF | GER | Markus Brzenska (on loan to MSV Duisburg) |
| 4 | DF | GER | Christian Wörns (released) |
| 10 | FW | CRO | Mladen Petrić (to Hamburger SV) |
| 23 | DF | SUI | Philipp Degen (to Liverpool F.C.) |
| 41 | GK | GER | Alexander Bade (to Arminia Bielefeld) |
| — | MF | RSA | Steven Pienaar (to Everton F.C., previously on loan) |

=== FC Energie Cottbus ===
In:

| No. | Pos. | Nation | Player |
|---|---|---|---|
| 8 | FW | BUL | Dimitar Rangelov (from RC Strasbourg, previously on loan) |
| 9 | FW | ROU | Emil Gabriel Jula (from Oţelul Galaţi) |
| 11 | FW | SRB | Ivica Iliev (from PAOK) |
| 12 | GK | GER | Philipp Pentke (from FC Augsburg) |
| 15 | DF | GER | Alexander Bittroff (from FC Energie Cottbus II) |
| 16 | MF | GER | Marco Kurth (from FC Erzgebirge Aue) |
| 19 | FW | GER | Marc Zimmermann (from FC Energie Cottbus youth) |
| 21 | DF | MNE | Savo Pavićević (from FK Vojvodina) |
| 22 | FW | GER | Danny Galm (from Eintracht Frankfurt II) |
| 35 | DF | TUR | Çağdaş Atan (from Trabzonspor) |
| 36 | DF | GER | Peter Hackenberg (from FC Energie Cottbus youth) |

Out:

| No. | Pos. | Nation | Player |
|---|---|---|---|
| 3 | MF | FRA | Christian Bassila (to EA Guingamp) |
| 12 | GK | GER | Martin Männel (to FC Erzgebirge Aue) |
| 13 | MF | GER | Sebastian Schuppan (to SC Paderborn 07) |
| 15 | DF | GER | Toni Wachsmuth (to SC Paderborn 07) |
| 19 | MF | POL | Przemysław Trytko (on loan to Arka Gdynia) |
| 22 | DF | GER | Arne Feick (to FC Erzgebirge Aue) |
| 25 | DF | CRO | Kristijan Ipša (ro FC Midtjylland) |
| 26 | MF | CYP | Efstathios Aloneftis (to AC Omonia) |
| 27 | DF | ROU | Ovidiu Burcă (on loan to Beijing Guoan) |
| 32 | DF | GER | Silvio Bankert (to 1. FC Magdeburg) |
| 35 | FW | CZE | Michal Papadopulos (loan return to Bayer 04 Leverkusen) |
| — | MF | POL | Tomasz Bandrowski (to Lech Poznań, previously on loan) |

=== Arminia Bielefeld ===
In:

| No. | Pos. | Nation | Player |
|---|---|---|---|
| 4 | DF | GER | Nico Herzig (from Alemannia Aachen) |
| 10 | FW | ZAM | Christopher Katongo (from Brøndby IF) |
| 11 | FW | FIN | Berat Sadik (from FC Lahti) |
| 15 | MF | BIH | Zlatko Janjic (from Arminia Bielefeld II) |
| 17 | DF | GER | Maik Rodenberg (from Arminia Bielefeld II) |
| 19 | MF | GER | Alexander Laas (on loan from VfL Wolfsburg) |
| 20 | DF | NED | Michael Lamey (from MSV Duisburg) |
| 22 | GK | GER | Dennis Eilhoff (loan return from TuS Koblenz) |
| 38 | GK | GER | Alexander Bade (from Borussia Dortmund) |

Out:

| No. | Pos. | Nation | Player |
|---|---|---|---|
| 1 | GK | GER | Mathias Hain (to FC St. Pauli) |
| 4 | DF | CZE | Petr Gabriel (to FK Viktoria Žižkov) |
| 9 | FW | GER | Christian Eigler (to 1. FC Nürnberg) |
| 10 | MF | GER | Ioannis Masmanidis (to 1. FC Nürnberg) |
| 11 | MF | CZE | David Kobylik (to AC Omonia) |
| 17 | MF | TUR | Umut Koçin (to Kayserispor) |
| 19 | DF | GER | Bernd Korzynietz (on loan to VfL Wolfsburg) |
| 20 | MF | GER | Jörg Böhme (retired) |
| 21 | DF | GER | Matthias Langkamp (to Panionios F.C.) |
| 22 | FW | RSA | Sibusiso Zuma (to Mamelodi Sundowns FC) |
| 27 | DF | GER | Nils-Christian Schmidt (released) |
| 40 | GK | GER | Dirk Heinen (retired) |
| — | MF | GER | Tim Danneberg (to Eintracht Braunschweig, previously on loan) |

=== Borussia Mönchengladbach ===
In:

| No. | Pos. | Nation | Player |
|---|---|---|---|
| 6 | DF | GER | Jan-Ingwer Callsen-Bracker (from Bayer 04 Leverkusen) |
| 18 | GK | GER | Frederic Löhe (from Borussia Mönchengladbach II) |
| 19 | MF | ISR | Gal Alberman (from Beitar Jerusalem) |
| 20 | DF | FRA | Jean-Sébastien Jaurès (from AJ Auxerre) |
| 26 | MF | USA | Michael Bradley (from SC Heerenveen) |
| 40 | FW | ALG | Karim Matmour (from SC Freiburg) |

Out:

| No. | Pos. | Nation | Player |
|---|---|---|---|
| 6 | MF | GER | Eugen Polanski (to Getafe CF) |
| 9 | FW | ANG | Nando Rafael (to AGF Aarhus) |
| 20 | DF | DEN | Kasper Bøgelund (to Aalborg BK) |
| 26 | DF | GER | Robert Fleßers (to 1. FSV Mainz 05) |
| — | MF | SUI | David Degen (to BSC Young Boys, previously on loan to FC Basel) |
| — | DF | POR | Zé António (to Racing de Santander, previously on loan to Manisaspor) |

=== TSG 1899 Hoffenheim ===
In:

| No. | Pos. | Nation | Player |
|---|---|---|---|
| 2 | DF | GER | Andreas Beck (from VfB Stuttgart) |
| 12 | FW | BRA | Wellington (from Sport Club Internacional, previously on loan to Náutico) |
| 21 | DF | BRA | Gustavo (from Corinthians Alagoano, previously on loan) |
| 25 | DF | GHA | Isaac Vorsah (from Asante Kotoko, previously on loan) |
| 27 | GK | AUT | Ramazan Özcan (from FC Red Bull Salzburg, previously on loan) |
| 36 | FW | GER | Marco Terrazzino (from TSG 1899 Hoffenheim youth) |
| 37 | MF | GER | Jonas Strifler (from TSG 1899 Hoffenheim youth) |

Out:

| No. | Pos. | Nation | Player |
|---|---|---|---|
| 4 | MF | GER | Steffen Haas (on loan to Kickers Offenbach) |
| 6 | DF | GER | Michael Rundio (released) |
| 7 | MF | GER | Dragan Paljic (to 1. FC Kaiserslautern) |
| 11 | FW | CRO | Tomislav Marić (retired) |
| 12 | MF | GER | Denis Bindnagel (to SV Sandhausen) |
| 15 | MF | CZE | Radek Špiláček (to FSV Frankfurt) |
| 16 | MF | GER | Matthias Keller (to TSG 1899 Hoffenheim II) |
| 18 | FW | GER | Kai Hesse (to 1. FC Kaiserslautern) |

=== 1. FC Köln ===
In:

| No. | Pos. | Nation | Player |
|---|---|---|---|
| 2 | DF | SVN | Mišo Brečko (from Hamburger SV) |
| 6 | DF | CMR | Pierre Wome (from SV Werder Bremen) |
| 9 | FW | NGA | Manasseh Ishiaku (from MSV Duisburg) |
| 12 | MF | POR | Petit (from S.L. Benfica) |
| 13 | MF | GER | Daniel Brosinski (from Karlsruher SC II) |
| 14 | MF | BFA | Wilfried Sanou (from SC Freiburg) |
| 21 | DF | BRA | Pedro Geromel (from Vitória S.C.) |
| 24 | FW | ROU | Sergiu Radu (on loan from VfL Wolfsburg) |
| 29 | MF | GER | Taner Yalcin (from 1. FC Köln youth) |
| 30 | MF | GER | Michael Gardawski (from 1. FC Köln youth) |
| 34 | GK | CRO | Miro Varvodić (on loan from Hajduk Split) |

Out:

| No. | Pos. | Nation | Player |
|---|---|---|---|
| 5 | DF | TUR | Alpay Özalan (released) |
| 9 | FW | GER | Patrick Helmes (to Bayer 04 Leverkusen) |
| 12 | MF | HON | Maynor Suazo (loan return to Antalyaspor) |
| 16 | MF | BRA | André (on loan to Náutico) |
| 18 | MF | GER | Salvatore Gambino (to TuS Koblenz) |
| 26 | DF | MKD | Aleksandar Mitreski (to 1. FC Nürnberg) |
| 32 | GK | GER | Dieter Paucken (to TuS Koblenz) |

=== Statistics ===
By Country

| Country | Transfers In | Transfers Out | Internal Transfers | Total Transfers |
|---|---|---|---|---|
| Germany | 46 | 57 | 12 | 115 |
| Brazil | 14 | 6 | 1 | 21 |
| Czech Republic | 2 | 7 | 1 | 10 |
| Turkey | 4 | 3 | 0 | 7 |
| Croatia | 2 | 4 | 1 | 7 |
| Austria | 4 | 2 | 0 | 6 |
| Bosnia and Herzegovina | 3 | 1 | 2 | 6 |
| Portugal | 3 | 3 | 0 | 6 |
| The Netherlands | 3 | 1 | 0 | 4 |
| Denmark | 0 | 4 | 0 | 4 |
| Romania | 2 | 1 | 1 | 4 |
| Switzerland | 1 | 2 | 1 | 4 |
| Italy | 3 | 0 | 0 | 3 |
| Peru | 3 | 0 | 0 | 3 |
| United States | 2 | 1 | 0 | 3 |
| Ghana | 2 | 1 | 0 | 3 |
| Serbia | 2 | 0 | 1 | 3 |
| Poland | 0 | 3 | 0 | 3 |
| Greece | 1 | 2 | 0 | 3 |
| France | 2 | 1 | 0 | 3 |
| Paraguay | 1 | 1 | 0 | 2 |
| Cameroon | 1 | 0 | 1 | 2 |
| Colombia | 1 | 1 | 0 | 2 |
| Burkina Faso | 2 | 0 | 0 | 2 |
| Argentina | 0 | 2 | 0 | 2 |
| Belgium | 0 | 2 | 0 | 2 |
| Finland | 2 | 0 | 0 | 2 |
| Iceland | 1 | 1 | 0 | 2 |
| Ukraine | 1 | 1 | 0 | 2 |
| Bulgaria | 2 | 0 | 0 | 2 |
| Nigeria | 1 | 1 | 0 | 2 |
| Paraguay | 1 | 1 | 0 | 2 |
| South Africa | 0 | 2 | 0 | 2 |
| (Georgia (country)) Georgia | 1 | 0 | 0 | 1 |
| Morocco | 1 | 0 | 0 | 1 |
| Egypt | 0 | 0 | 1 | 1 |
| Slovenia | 1 | 0 | 0 | 1 |
| Republic of the Congo | 0 | 1 | 0 | 1 |
| Guinea | 0 | 1 | 0 | 1 |
| Albania | 0 | 1 | 0 | 1 |
| Senegal | 0 | 1 | 0 | 1 |
| Sweden | 0 | 1 | 0 | 1 |
| Ivory Coast | 1 | 0 | 0 | 1 |
| Russia | 0 | 1 | 0 | 1 |
| Iran | 0 | 1 | 0 | 1 |
| Australia | 0 | 1 | 0 | 1 |
| Tunisia | 1 | 0 | 0 | 1 |
| Hungary | 0 | 0 | 1 | 1 |
| South Korea | 1 | 0 | 0 | 1 |
| Montenegro | 1 | 0 | 0 | 1 |
| Cyprus | 0 | 1 | 0 | 1 |
| Zambia | 1 | 0 | 0 | 1 |
| Israel | 1 | 0 | 0 | 1 |
| Algeria | 1 | 0 | 0 | 1 |
| Honduras | 0 | 1 | 0 | 1 |
| (North Macedonia) Macedonia | 0 | 1 | 0 | 1 |
Last updated: September 2, 2008.

By League

| League | Transfers In | Transfers Out | Internal Transfers |
|---|---|---|---|
| (Germany) 2. Bundesliga | 18 | 37 | 55 |
| (Germany) 3. Liga | 11 | 15 | 26 |
| (Brazil) Campeonato Brasileiro Série A | 10 | 5 | 15 |
| (Germany) Under 19 Bundesliga | 13 | 0 | 13 |
| (England) FA Premier League | 6 | 4 | 10 |
| (Austria) Austrian Bundesliga | 4 | 4 | 8 |
| (Denmark) Danish Superliga | 2 | 6 | 8 |
| Super League Greece | 3 | 4 | 7 |
| (Turkey) Süper Lig | 2 | 4 | 6 |
| (Germany) Regionalliga Nord | 4 | 2 | 6 |
| (Portugal) BWIN Liga | 5 | 0 | 5 |
| (Netherlands) Eredivisie | 5 | 0 | 5 |
| (France) Ligue 1 | 2 | 2 | 4 |
| (Spain) La Liga | 1 | 3 | 4 |
| (Italy) Serie A | 3 | 0 | 3 |
| (Germany) Regionalliga West | 3 | 0 | 3 |
| (Czech Republic) Gambrinus Liga | 1 | 2 | 3 |
| (Poland) Ekstraklasa | 0 | 3 | 3 |
| (France) Ligue 2 | 2 | 1 | 3 |
| (Norway) Tippeligaen | 0 | 2 | 2 |
| (Romania) Liga I | 2 | 0 | 2 |
| (England) The Championship | 1 | 1 | 2 |
| (Ukraine) Ukrainian Premier League | 0 | 2 | 2 |
| (Germany) Regionalliga Sūd | 2 | 0 | 2 |
| (Cyprus) Cypriot First Division | 0 | 2 | 2 |
| (Germany) Oberliga Nordrhein-Westfalen | 2 | 0 | 2 |
| (Switzerland) Swiss Super League | 1 | 1 | 2 |
| (Bosnia and Herzegovina) Primijer Liga | 1 | 0 | 1 |
| (Brazil) Campeonato Brasileiro Série B | 1 | 0 | 1 |
| (Switzerland) Swiss Challenge League | 1 | 0 | 1 |
| (Argentina) Argentine Primera División | 0 | 1 | 1 |
| (Belgium) Jupiler League | 0 | 1 | 1 |
| (Australia) A-League | 0 | 1 | 1 |
| (Bulgaria) TBI A Football Group | 1 | 0 | 1 |
| (Tunisia) CLP 1 | 1 | 0 | 1 |
| (Russia) Russian Premier League | 0 | 1 | 1 |
| (Spain) Segunda División | 0 | 1 | 1 |
| (Germany) Oberliga Bayern | 1 | 0 | 1 |
| (Serbia) Serbian Superliga | 1 | 0 | 1 |
| (China) Chinese Super League | 0 | 1 | 1 |
| (Finland) Veikkausliiga | 1 | 0 | 1 |
| (South Africa) ABSA Premier League | 0 | 1 | 1 |
| (Israel) Israeli Premier League | 1 | 0 | 1 |
| (Turkey) TFF First League | 1 | 0 | 1 |
| (Ghana) OneTouch Premier League | 1 | 0 | 1 |
| (Germany) Oberliga Baden-Württemberg | 0 | 1 | 1 |
| (Croatia) Prva HNL | 1 | 0 | 1 |
Last updated: September 3, 2008.

== 2. Bundesliga ==
=== 1. FC Nürnberg ===
In:

| No. | Pos. | Nation | Player |
|---|---|---|---|
| 1 | GK | GER | Raphael Schäfer (from VfB Stuttgart) |
| 3 | DF | GER | Patrick Wolf (from 1. FC Kaiserslautern youth) |
| 4 | DF | POR | José Gonçalves (on loan from Heart of Midlothian F.C.) |
| 6 | DF | MKD | Aleksandar Mitreski (from 1. FC Köln) |
| 7 | MF | SUI | Daniel Gygax (from FC Metz) |
| 8 | FW | GER | Christian Eigler (from Arminia Bielefeld) |
| 10 | MF | GER | Ioannis Masmanidis (from Arminia Bielefeld) |
| 13 | MF | GER | Peter Perchtold (from VfB Stuttgart) |
| 15 | DF | GER | Michael Kammermeyer (from 1. FC Nürnberg II) |
| 16 | MF | GER | Juri Judt (from SpVgg Greuther Fürth) |
| 17 | FW | GER | Mike Frantz (from 1. FC Saarbrücken) |
| 19 | FW | GHA | Isaac Boakye (from VfL Wolfsburg, previously on loan to 1. FSV Mainz 05) |
| 20 | DF | GER | Pascal Bieler (from Hertha BSC) |
| 35 | FW | GER | Chhunly Pagenburg (loan return from TSV 1860 Munich) |
| 37 | MF | SVK | Mario Breska (from MŠK Žilina) |

Out:

| No. | Pos. | Nation | Player |
|---|---|---|---|
| 2 | DF | DEN | Lars Jacobsen (to Everton F.C.) |
| 3 | DF | AUS | Michael Beauchamp (to Aalborg BK) |
| 4 | DF | BRA | Gláuber (to Manchester City F.C.) |
| 6 | MF | CZE | Tomáš Galásek (to FC Baník Ostrava) |
| 10 | MF | BIH | Zvjezdan Misimović (to VfL Wolfsburg) |
| 13 | FW | RUS | Ivan Saenko (to FC Spartak Moscow) |
| 15 | MF | DEN | Jan Kristiansen (to Brøndby IF) |
| 16 | MF | GER | Ralf Schmidt (to FC Carl Zeiss Jena) |
| 17 | FW | GER | Nicky Adler (to MSV Duisburg) |
| 19 | FW | CZE | Jan Koller (to FC Krylia Sovetov Samara) |
| 26 | MF | GER | Christoph Weber (to SV Darmstadt 98) |
| 27 | DF | FRA | Jacques Abardonado (to Valenciennes FC) |
| 29 | GK | CZE | Jaromír Blažek (to Sparta Prague) |
| 32 | FW | CRO | Leon Benko (to Standard Liège) |
| 33 | FW | SVK | Róbert Vittek (to Lille OSC) |
| 37 | MF | GER | Sebastian Szikal (to SV Darmstadt 98) |

=== F.C. Hansa Rostock ===
In:

| No. | Pos. | Nation | Player |
|---|---|---|---|
| 6 | MF | DEN | Martin Retov (from Brøndby IF) |
| 11 | FW | GER | Robert Lechleiter (from SpVgg Unterhaching) |
| 13 | MF | GER | Mario Fillinger (from Hamburger SV) |
| 18 | DF | GER | Bastian Oczipka (on loan from Bayer Leverkusen II) |
| 19 | DF | GER | Tom Buschke (from F.C. Hansa Rostock II) |
| 20 | FW | GER | Kevin Schindler (on loan from SV Werder Bremen) |
| 22 | MF | GER | Sebastian Albert (from F.C. Hansa Rostock II) |

Out:

| No. | Pos. | Nation | Player |
|---|---|---|---|
| 7 | MF | GER | René Rydlewicz (to FC Anker Wismar) |
| 11 | FW | GER | Sebastian Hähnge (to FC Carl Zeiss Jena) |
| 12 | MF | GER | Marc Stein (to Hertha BSC) |
| 13 | DF | GER | Tim Sebastian (to Karlsruher SC) |
| 18 | FW | IRN | Amir Shapourzadeh (to FSV Frankfurt) |
| 22 | MF | GER | Stefan Beinlich (retired) |
| 28 | FW | NGA | Victor Agali (to Skoda Xanthi) |

=== MSV Duisburg ===
In:

| No. | Pos. | Nation | Player |
|---|---|---|---|
| 3 | DF | BRA | Tiago Calvano (from BSC Young Boys) |
| 5 | DF | GER | Mounir Chaftar (from Eintracht Frankfurt) |
| 6 | MF | TUR | Olcay Şahan (from Borussia Mönchengladbach II) |
| 7 | FW | GER | Sandro Wagner (from FC Bayern Munich II) |
| 9 | FW | BEL | Ibrahim Salou (from Club Brugge K.V.) |
| 10 | MF | COD | Cédric Makiadi (on loan from VfL Wolfsburg) |
| 14 | DF | CMR | Serge Branco (free agent) |
| 15 | MF | FRA | Grégory Christ (on loan from R. Charleroi S.C.) |
| 16 | FW | GER | Nicky Adler (from 1. FC Nürnberg) |
| 19 | FW | CMR | Dorge Kouemaha (from Debreceni VSC) |
| 21 | MF | GER | Chinedu Ede (from Hertha BSC) |
| 27 | FW | CMR | Valentine Atem (from SV Wehen Wiesbaden) |
| 32 | DF | GER | Markus Brzenska (on loan from Borussia Dortmund) |
| — | FW | GER | Marcel Heller (on loan from Eintracht Frankfurt) |

Out:

| No. | Pos. | Nation | Player |
|---|---|---|---|
| 1 | GK | GER | Sven Beuckert (released) |
| 2 | DF | GER | Christian Weber (to AEL) |
| 3 | DF | ROU | Iulian Filipescu (released) |
| 6 | DF | BRA | Fernando Santos (released) |
| 7 | MF | BUL | Blagoy Georgiev (loan return to Red Star Belgrade) |
| 9 | FW | SVN | Klemen Lavrič (to Omiya Ardija) |
| 9 | FW | ROU | Claudiu Niculescu (to Omonia Nicosia) |
| 14 | MF | GER | Andreas Voss (retired) |
| 15 | DF | NED | Michael Lamey (to Arminia Bielefeld) |
| 16 | DF | GER | Silvio Schröter (released) |
| 17 | FW | GER | Markus Daun (to Alemannia Aachen) |
| 19 | FW | NGA | Manasseh Ishiaku (to 1. FC Köln) |
| 21 | MF | GER | Markus Neumayr (to S.V. Zulte Waregem) |
| 25 | FW | GER | Sascha Mölders (to Rot-Weiss Essen) |
| 31 | MF | GER | Nils-Ole Book (on loan to Rot Weiss Ahlen) |
| 33 | DF | GER | Stefan Blank (retired) |
| 40 | FW | CRO | Bojan Vručina (loan return to NK Slaven Belupo) |
| — | DF | TUR | Necat Aygün (to FC Ingolstadt 04, previously on loan) |

=== 1. FSV Mainz 05 ===
In:

| No. | Pos. | Nation | Player |
|---|---|---|---|
| 3 | DF | BEL | Peter Van Der Heyden (from VfL Wolfsburg) |
| 9 | FW | ECU | Félix Borja (from Olympiacos, previously on loan) |
| 14 | DF | AUS | Marlon Clausius (from Sydney FC) |
| 16 | MF | GER | Florian Heller (from FC Erzgebirge Aue) |
| 18 | MF | ALB | Jahmir Hyka (from Olympiacos, previously on loan to KF Tirana) |
| 23 | FW | BFA | Aristide Bancé (from FC Metalurh Donetsk, previously on loan to Kickers Offenbach) |
| 26 | DF | GER | Niko Bungert (from Kickers Offenbach) |

Out:

| No. | Pos. | Nation | Player |
|---|---|---|---|
| 3 | MF | BIH | Damir Vrančić (to Borussia Dortmund II) |
| 10 | FW | GHA | Isaac Boakye (loan return to VfL Wolfsburg) |
| 14 | DF | BRA | Wellington (loan return to Grêmio) |
| 18 | MF | GER | Fabian Liesenfeld (to Wormatia Worms) |
| 24 | DF | GER | Stefan Markolf (to Wuppertaler SV Borussia) |
| 28 | DF | USA | Neven Subotić (to Borussia Dortmund) |
| 32 | MF | CRO | Josip Landeka (to Stuttgarter Kickers) |
| — | FW | GER | Bakary Diakité (to SV Wehen Wiesbaden, previously on loan) |

=== SC Freiburg ===
In:

| No. | Pos. | Nation | Player |
|---|---|---|---|
| 1 | GK | FRA | Simon Pouplin (from Stade Rennais F.C.) |
| 6 | MF | MAR | Yacine Abdessadki (from RC Strasbourg) |
| 10 | FW | TUR | Suat Türker (from Kickers Offenbach) |
| 13 | FW | DEN | Tommy Bechmann (from VfL Bochum) |
| 18 | MF | GER | Johannes Flum (from SC Pfullendorf) |
| 23 | MF | GER | Julian Schuster (from VfB Stuttgart) |
| 30 | MF | GEO | David Targamadze (from SC Freiburg youth) |
| 39 | GK | GER | Michael Müller (from SC Freiburg youth) |

Out:

| No. | Pos. | Nation | Player |
|---|---|---|---|
| 1 | GK | GER | Alexander Walke (to SV Wehen Wiesbaden) |
| 4 | DF | GEO | Otar Khizaneishvili (to FC Augsburg) |
| 6 | MF | GER | Dennis Aogo (to Hamburger SV) |
| 8 | MF | BFA | Jonathan Pitroipa (to Hamburger SV) |
| 9 | FW | BIH | Mirnes Mesić (to Kickers Offenbach) |
| 13 | FW | TUN | Amir Akrout (loan return to Stade Tunisien) |
| 23 | DF | BFA | Wilfried Sanou (to 1. FC Köln) |
| 25 | FW | CZE | Henrich Benčík (to FSV Frankfurt) |
| 28 | MF | GER | Maik Schutzbach (to Kickers Offenbach) |
| 30 | FW | GHA | Owusu Ampomah (Liberty Professionals F.C.) |
| 32 | GK | CRO | Josip Solić (NK Solin) |
| 40 | FW | ALG | Karim Matmour (to Borussia Mönchengladbach) |
| — | DF | NGA | Seyi Olajengbesi (to Alemannia Aachen, previously on loan) |

=== SpVgg Greuther Fürth ===
In:

| No. | Pos. | Nation | Player |
|---|---|---|---|
| 3 | DF | BUL | Asen Karaslavov (from PFC Slavia Sofia, previously on loan) |
| 6 | MF | GER | Thomas Wörle (from Kickers Offenbach) |
| 13 | MF | GER | Charles Takyi (from FC St. Pauli) |
| 20 | DF | GER | Martin Meichelbeck (from VfL Bochum) |
| 21 | MF | GER | Daniel Brückner (from FC Rot-Weiß Erfurt) |
| 22 | FW | TUN | Sami Allagui (from FC Carl Zeiss Jena) |
| 23 | MF | GER | Philipp Langen (from TuS Koblenz) |
| 36 | FW | ESP | Sercan Sararer (from SpVgg Greuther Fürth II) |
| — | DF | | Shqipran Skeraj (from KF Prishtina) |

Out:

| No. | Pos. | Nation | Player |
|---|---|---|---|
| 2 | DF | TUN | Zied Bhairi (to C.F. Gloria 1922 Bistriţa) |
| 6 | MF | GER | Sascha Boller (released) |
| 13 | MF | GER | Martin Lanig (to VfB Stuttgart) |
| 16 | MF | GER | Juri Judt (to 1. FC Nürnberg) |
| 20 | MF | AUT | Robert Schellander (loan return to FC Kärnten) |
| 23 | MF | GER | Daniel Adlung (to VfL Wolfsburg) |
| 32 | DF | GER | Timo Achenbach (to Alemannia Aachen) |
| — | MF | GER | Markus Karl (to FC Ingolstadt 04, previously on loan) |
| — | FW | AUT | Stefan Maierhofer (to SK Rapid Wien, previously on loan) |
| — | FW | GER | Torsten Oehrl (to SV Werder Bremen II, previously on loan to Eintracht Braunschweig) |

=== Alemannia Aachen ===
In:

| No. | Pos. | Nation | Player |
|---|---|---|---|
| 9 | FW | GER | Benjamin Auer (from VfL Bochum) |
| 10 | MF | AUT | Andreas Lasnik (from FK Austria Wien) |
| 11 | FW | GER | Markus Daun (from MSV Duisburg) |
| 16 | MF | GER | Florian Müller (from 1. FC Magdeburg) |
| 18 | FW | GER | Lewis Holtby (from Alemannia Aachen youth) |
| 19 | DF | NGA | Seyi Olajengbesi (from SC Freiburg, previously on loan) |
| 30 | DF | POL | Łukasz Szukała (from TSV 1860 Munich) |
| 32 | DF | GER | Timo Achenbach (from SpVgg Greuther Fürth) |

Out:

| No. | Pos. | Nation | Player |
|---|---|---|---|
| 2 | DF | GER | Nico Herzig (to Arminia Bielefeld) |
| 9 | FW | BUL | Todor Kolev (loan return to PFC Slavia Sofia) |
| 11 | MF | CZE | Luboš Pecka (loan return to FK Mladá Boleslav) |
| 13 | FW | GER | Emmanuel Krontiris (to TuS Koblenz) |
| 16 | FW | GER | Marius Ebbers (to FC St. Pauli) |
| 18 | FW | COL | John Mosquera (loan return to SV Werder Bremen) |
| 22 | DF | NED | Jeffrey Leiwakabessy (to Anorthosis Famagusta FC) |
| 23 | MF | ROU | Laurenţiu Reghecampf (to 1. FC Kaiserslautern) |
| — | DF | GER | Benjamin Weigelt (to FC St. Pauli, previously on loan to 1. FC Kaiserslautern) |

=== SV Wehen Wiesbaden ===
In:

| No. | Pos. | Nation | Player |
|---|---|---|---|
| 3 | DF | GER | Thorsten Barg (from Karlsruher SC II) |
| 7 | MF | GER | Björn Ziegenbein (from TSV 1860 Munich) |
| 18 | MF | MNE | Slobodan Lakicevic (from Bayer 04 Leverkusen II) |
| 20 | FW | MNE | Sanibal Orahovac (from FC Erzgebirge Aue) |
| 21 | FW | NED | Erwin Koen (from SC Paderborn 07) |
| 23 | GK | GER | Marc Birkenbach (from Sportfreunde Siegen) |
| 25 | FW | GER | Bakary Diakité (from 1. FSV Mainz 05, previously on loan) |
| 31 | GK | GER | Alexander Walke (from SC Freiburg) |
| 36 | DF | BFA | Saidou Panandétiguiri (from K.S.C. Lokeren) |

Out:

| No. | Pos. | Nation | Player |
|---|---|---|---|
| 1 | GK | BIH | Adnan Masić (to SV Elversberg) |
| 3 | DF | GER | Robert Paul (to SV Elversberg) |
| 7 | MF | GER | Enis Alushi (to SC Paderborn 07) |
| 15 | DF | GER | Benjamin Schöckel (to VfR Aalen) |
| 20 | MF | GER | Florian Stahl (released) |
| 24 | MF | GER | Maximilian Nicu (to Hertha BSC) |
| 27 | FW | CMR | Valentine Atem (to MSV Duisburg) |

=== FC St. Pauli ===
In:

| No. | Pos. | Nation | Player |
|---|---|---|---|
| 3 | DF | CMR | Marc Gouiffe à Goufan (from SC Paderborn 07) |
| 7 | FW | GER | Rouwen Hennings (on loan from Hamburger SV, previously on loan to VfL Osnabrück) |
| 13 | DF | GER | Benjamin Weigelt (from Alemannia Aachen) |
| 16 | FW | GER | Marius Ebbers (from Alemannia Aachen) |
| 23 | MF | CAN | David Hoilett (on loan from Blackburn Rovers, previously on loan to SC Paderborn 07) |
| 25 | GK | GER | Mathias Hain (from Arminia Bielefeld) |
| 28 | FW | TUR | Ömer Şişmanoğlu (from FC St. Pauli II) |
| 29 | MF | GER | Serhat Yapici (from FC St. Pauli II) |
| 30 | MF | GER | Dennis Daube (from FC St. Pauli youth) |

Out:

| No. | Pos. | Nation | Player |
|---|---|---|---|
| 3 | DF | UKR | Pavlo Ianchuk (released) |
| 7 | MF | GER | Marvin Braun (to VfL Osnabrück) |
| 13 | MF | GER | Charles Takyi (to SpVgg Greuther Fürth) |
| 15 | DF | SEN | Abdou Sall (released) |
| 16 | MF | GER | Roman Prokoph (to VfL Bochum II) |
| 19 | DF | GER | Tim Petersen (to FC Carl Zeiss Jena) |
| 20 | MF | CAN | Jonathan Beaulieu-Bourgault (on loan to SV Wilhelmshaven) |
| 23 | FW | TUR | Ahmet Kuru (to Antalyaspor) |
| 32 | GK | GER | Timo Reus (to VfR Aalen) |
| -- | MF | GER | Christopher Mahrt (to Wuppertaler SV Borussia) |
| -- | MF | TUR | Gökhan Iscan (to Altay Izmir) |
| -- | GK | GER | Fabian Lucassen (to SV Wilhelmshaven) |

=== TuS Koblenz ===
In:

| No. | Pos. | Nation | Player |
|---|---|---|---|
| 1 | GK | USA | David Yelldell (from Stuttgarter Kickers) |
| 7 | MF | GER | Salvatore Gambino (from 1. FC Köln) |
| 10 | FW | GER | Emmanuel Krontiris (from Alemannia Aachen) |
| 15 | DF | GER | Dominique Ndjeng (from VfL Osnabrück) |
| 16 | FW | FRA | Fabrice Begeorgi (on loan from Olympique Marseille) |
| 17 | MF | GER | Mustafa Parmak (from Stuttgarter Kickers) |
| 23 | DF | GER | Matthias Franz (from Hamburger SV II) |
| 27 | MF | GER | Johannes Göderz (from TuS Koblenz II) |
| 28 | MF | GER | Lars Bender (from TuS Koblenz II) |
| 30 | MF | GER | Dominik Mader (from FC Donzdorf) |
| 31 | GK | GER | Marcus Rickert (from Kickers Emden) |
| 32 | MF | GER | Patrick Schmidt (from TuS Koblenz II) |
| — | GK | GER | Dieter Paucken (to 1. FC Köln) |
| — | FW | USA | Matt Taylor (from Hollywood United F.C.) |

Out:

| No. | Pos. | Nation | Player |
|---|---|---|---|
| 1 | GK | GER | Dennis Eilhoff (loan return to Arminia Bielefeld) |
| 7 | MF | GER | Sascha Traut (to Stuttgarter Kickers) |
| 10 | MF | GER | Anel Džaka (to 1. FC Kaiserslautern) |
| 16 | DF | USA | Joshua Grenier (released) |
| 17 | MF | GER | Philipp Langen (to SpVgg Greuther Fürth) |
| 33 | GK | GER | Michael Gurski (to SV Sandhausen) |
| — | FW | MKD | Artim Položani (to FK Vardar, previously on loan to KS Dinamo Tirana) |

=== TSV 1860 Munich ===
In:

| No. | Pos. | Nation | Player |
|---|---|---|---|
| 6 | DF | FRA | Mathieu Béda (from 1. FC Kaiserslautern) |
| 11 | FW | GER | Benjamin Lauth (from Hannover 96) |
| 13 | DF | GER | Florian Jungwirth (from TSV 1860 Munich II) |
| 26 | DF | AUT | Julian Baumgartlinger (from TSV 1860 Munich II) |
| 27 | FW | GER | Manuel Schäffler (from TSV 1860 Munich II) |
| 29 | GK | GER | Markus Krauss (from SSV Reutlingen) |

Out:

| No. | Pos. | Nation | Player |
|---|---|---|---|
| 11 | FW | USA | Josh Wolff (to Kansas City Wizards) |
| 13 | FW | GER | Chhunly Pagenburg (loan return to 1. FC Nürnberg) |
| 27 | MF | GER | Björn Ziegenbein (to SV Wehen Wiesbaden) |
| 30 | DF | POL | Łukasz Szukała (to Alemannia Aachen) |

=== VfL Osnabrück ===
In:

| No. | Pos. | Nation | Player |
|---|---|---|---|
| 2 | DF | BRA | Anderson (on loan from Bayer 04 Leverkusen) |
| 3 | DF | GER | René Trehkopf (from FC Erzgebirge Aue) |
| 4 | DF | NGA | Darlington Omodiagbe (from FC Carl Zeiss Jena) |
| 6 | MF | GER | Dominic Peitz (from SV Werder Bremen II) |
| 7 | MF | GER | Marvin Braun (from FC St. Pauli) |
| 8 | MF | GER | Tom Geißler (from FC Erzgebirge Aue) |
| 16 | FW | GER | Fiete Sykora (from FC Erzgebirge Aue) |
| 18 | FW | GER | Lars Fuchs (from Eintracht Braunschweig) |
| 25 | MF | GER | Konstantin Engel (from VfL Osnabrück II) |
| 27 | MF | GER | Edgar Bernhardt (from FC Emmen) |
| 33 | GK | GER | Stefan Wessels (from Everton F.C.) |

Out:

| No. | Pos. | Nation | Player |
|---|---|---|---|
| 1 | GK | GER | Frederik Gößling (released) |
| 2 | DF | GER | Marko Tredup (to SV Bad Rothenfelde) |
| 3 | MF | GER | Jan Schanda (to Eintracht Braunschweig) |
| 6 | DF | GER | Oliver Beer (released) |
| 7 | MF | LBN | Bilal Aziz (to Kayserispor) |
| 8 | MF | USA | Joe Enochs (retired) |
| 10 | MF | GER | Alexander Nouri (to Holstein Kiel) |
| 14 | DF | GER | Daniel Flottmann (to SC Verl) |
| 16 | DF | GER | Hendrik Großöhmichen (to Holstein Kiel) |
| 27 | FW | GER | Rouwen Hennings (loan return to Hamburger SV) |
| 40 | DF | GER | Dominique Ndjeng (to TuS Koblenz) |

=== 1. FC Kaiserslautern ===
In:

| No. | Pos. | Nation | Player |
|---|---|---|---|
| 5 | DF | GER | Martin Amedick (from Borussia Dortmund) |
| 6 | DF | GER | Mathias Abel (from FC Schalke 04) |
| 8 | MF | GER | Sidney Sam (on loan from Hamburger SV) |
| 9 | FW | CRO | Srđan Lakić (from Hertha BSC, previously on loan to Heracles Almelo) |
| 10 | MF | GER | Anel Džaka (from TuS Koblenz) |
| 13 | DF | GER | Mario Klinger (from Rot-Weiss Essen) |
| 20 | MF | GER | Dragan Paljic (from TSG 1899 Hoffenheim) |
| 22 | MF | ROU | Laurenţiu Reghecampf (from Alemannia Aachen) |
| 23 | DF | GER | Florian Dick (from Karlsruher SC) |
| 29 | GK | GER | Kevin Trapp (from 1. FC Kaiserslautern youth) |
| — | FW | GER | Kai Hesse (from TSG 1899 Hoffenheim) |

Out:

| No. | Pos. | Nation | Player |
|---|---|---|---|
| 3 | MF | FRA | Mathieu Béda (to TSV 1860 Munich) |
| 5 | MF | CMR | Georges Mandjeck (loan return to VfB Stuttgart) |
| 8 | MF | AUT | Stefan Lexa (to SV Ried) |
| 9 | FW | SWE | Björn Runström (loan return to Fulham F.C.) |
| 10 | MF | CAN | Patrice Bernier (to FC Nordsjælland) |
| 11 | FW | ROU | Victoraş Iacob (released) |
| 13 | DF | GER | Benjamin Weigelt (loan return to Alemannia Aachen) |
| 14 | FW | NGA | Emeka Opara (to Étoile Sportive du Sahel) |
| 22 | MF | GER | Steffen Bohl (released) |
| 27 | GK | GER | Florian Fromlowitz (to Hannover 96) |

=== FC Augsburg ===
In:

| No. | Pos. | Nation | Player |
|---|---|---|---|
| 3 | DF | GEO | Otar Khizaneishvili (from SC Freiburg) |
| 6 | DF | GER | Thomas Kläsener (from SC Paderborn 07) |
| 13 | FW | GER | Tobias Werner (from FC Carl Zeiss Jena) |
| 14 | FW | HUN | Sándor Torghelle (from FC Carl Zeiss Jena) |
| 15 | DF | AUT | Mark Prettenthaler (from SK Sturm Graz) |
| 16 | DF | GER | Uwe Möhrle (from VfL Wolfsburg, previously on loan) |
| 20 | DF | GER | Christian Müller (from Kickers Offenbach) |
| 23 | FW | ZAM | Andrew Sinkala (from SC Paderborn 07) |
| 36 | FW | GER | Stephan Hain (from FC Augsburg II) |
| 55 | GK | BLR | Vasily Khomutovsky (from FC Carl Zeiss Jena) |
| — | MF | GER | Daniel Baier (on loan from VfL Wolfsburg) |
| — | FW | GER | Francis Kioyo (from Maccabi Netanya F.C.) |

Out:

| No. | Pos. | Nation | Player |
|---|---|---|---|
| 2 | DF | CZE | Václav Drobný (to FC Spartak Trnava) |
| 3 | DF | GER | Sören Dreßler (to FC Ingolstadt 04) |
| 6 | DF | GER | Timo Wenzel (to AC Omonia) |
| 7 | FW | CMR | Mamadou Diabang (to FK Austria Wien) |
| 8 | MF | CRC | Froylan Ledezma (released) |
| 12 | GK | GER | Patrick Platins (loan return to VfL Wolfsburg) |
| 13 | DF | AUT | Patrick Pircher (released) |
| 14 | MF | SVK | Peter Hlinka (to SK Sturm Graz) |
| 20 | MF | GER | Sebastian Becker (to Kickers Offenbach) |
| 23 | FW | GER | Felix Luz (to Rot-Weiß Oberhausen) |
| 25 | GK | GER | Philipp Pentke (to FC Energie Cottbus) |
| 29 | MF | GER | Bajram Nebihi (released) |

=== Rot Weiss Ahlen ===
In:

| No. | Pos. | Nation | Player |
|---|---|---|---|
| 19 | DF | GER | Nils Döring (from SC Paderborn 07) |
| 22 | MF | GER | Manuel Bölstler (from Wuppertaler SV Borussia) |
| 31 | MF | GER | Nils-Ole Book (on loan from MSV Duisburg) |

Out:

| No. | Pos. | Nation | Player |
|---|---|---|---|
| 5 | DF | GER | Julian Schmidt (to SC Verl) |
| 6 | MF | GER | Oliver Glöden (released) |
| 10 | MF | BRA | Danilo (released) |
| 14 | MF | GER | Bernhard Venker (to SC Verl) |
| 15 | DF | GER | Marco Kaminski (to SC Verl) |
| 16 | DF | GER | Sascha Brinker (released) |
| 19 | DF | GER | Konstantin Beckmann (to Arminia Bielefeld II) |

=== Rot-Weiß Oberhausen ===
In:

| No. | Pos. | Nation | Player |
|---|---|---|---|
| 6 | DF | GER | Kim Falkenberg (on loan from Bayer 04 Leverkusen II) |
| 7 | MF | GER | Moritz Stoppelkamp (from Rot-Weiss Essen) |
| 17 | MF | TUR | Ferhat Kıskanç (from Rot-Weiss Essen) |
| 18 | FW | GER | Christopher Nöthe (on loan from Borussia Dortmund II) |
| 21 | GK | GER | Sören Pirson (from Rot-Weiss Essen) |
| 24 | DF | GER | Tino Westphal (from VfB Hüls) |
| 27 | MF | GER | Benjamin Schüßler (from SC Paderborn 07) |
| 33 | FW | GER | Felix Luz (from FC Augsburg) |

Out:

| No. | Pos. | Nation | Player |
|---|---|---|---|
| 6 | MF | GER | Tobias Schäper (retired) |
| 7 | MF | GER | Thomas Tennagels (to Bonner SC) |
| 17 | DF | GER | Monir Ibrahim (to 1. FC Kleve) |
| 18 | MF | AUT | Ahmet Delic (to SKN St. Pölten) |
| 19 | FW | GER | Marcel Stiepermann (to Rot-Weiss Essen II) |
| 21 | GK | GER | Lukas Fronczyk (released) |

=== FC Ingolstadt 04 ===
In:

| No. | Pos. | Nation | Player |
|---|---|---|---|
| 4 | MF | GER | Matthias Schwarz (from FC Bayern Munich II) |
| 5 | DF | GER | Sören Dreßler (from FC Augsburg) |
| 8 | MF | GER | Markus Karl (from SpVgg Greuther Fürth, previously on loan) |
| 9 | FW | CZE | Vratislav Lokvenc (from FC Red Bull Salzburg, previously on loan to FC Basel) |
| 14 | MF | GER | Jakob Dallevedove (from FC Schalke 04 II) |
| 22 | MF | BRA | Daniel Lemos (from Fluminense) |
| 25 | MF | POR | Bragança (from Bahrain Riffa Club) |
| 27 | MF | ALB | Valdet Rama (from VfL Wolfsburg) |
| 30 | DF | GER | Christopher Reinhard (from Karlsruher SC) |
| 31 | GK | GER | Nils Schmadtke (from Borussia Mönchengladbach youth) |
| 33 | DF | GER | Necat Aygün (from MSV Duisburg, previously on loan) |

Out:

| No. | Pos. | Nation | Player |
|---|---|---|---|
| 4 | DF | GER | Markus Rosenwirth (to FC Ingolstadt 04 II) |
| 5 | MF | GER | Michael Schmidberger (retired) |
| 6 | MF | GER | Manfred Kroll (to FC Gerolfing) |
| 11 | MF | GER | Herbert Obele (to FC Ingolstadt 04 II) |
| 25 | GK | GER | Benjamin Huber (to Stuttgarter Kickers) |
| 27 | MF | GER | Tobias Strobl (to FC Ingolstadt 04 II) |
| 29 | FW | CAN | Ali Gerba (to Milton Keynes Dons F.C.) |
| 30 | MF | GER | Johannes Hintersberger (to TSV Gersthofen) |

=== FSV Frankfurt ===
In:

| No. | Pos. | Nation | Player |
|---|---|---|---|
| 3 | DF | GER | Emil Noll (to SC Paderborn 07) |
| 10 | MF | GRE | Giorgos Theodoridis (from Ergotelis F.C.) |
| 11 | FW | CZE | Henrich Benčík (from SC Freiburg) |
| 13 | GK | ITA | Christian Como (to Kickers Offenbach) |
| 15 | MF | CZE | Radek Špiláček (from TSG 1899 Hoffenheim) |
| 20 | FW | IRN | Amir Shapourzadeh (from F.C. Hansa Rostock) |
| 22 | DF | GER | Marc Gallego (from Sportfreunde Siegen) |
| 25 | GK | GER | Marjan Petković (from SV Sandhausen) |
| 26 | MF | MAR | Oualid Mokhtari (to Kickers Offenbach) |
| 27 | MF | MAR | Youssef Mokhtari (to Kickers Offenbach) |
| 30 | MF | GER | Christian Eggert (from Borussia Dortmund II) |

Out:

| No. | Pos. | Nation | Player |
|---|---|---|---|
| 3 | DF | GER | André Laurito (to Viktoria Aschaffenburg) |
| 7 | FW | GER | Renato Levy (to FSV 1926 Fernwald) |
| 13 | FW | GER | Abdelilah Bentaayate (released) |
| 15 | DF | GER | Sascha Volk (to 1. FC Eschborn) |
| 26 | GK | GER | Florian Schürenberg (to SpVgg Weiden) |
| 20 | DF | GER | Markus Gaubatz (to Viktoria Aschaffenburg) |
| 22 | FW | GER | Sebastian Göbig (released) |
| 25 | FW | NED | Samuel Koejoe (to FC Wacker Innsbruck) |
| 30 | GK | GER | Andreas Wagner (to 1. FC Eschborn) |
| 34 | MF | GHA | Lawrence Aidoo (to Kickers Emden) |
| 39 | MF | TUR | İbrahim Uyanık (released) |

== See also ==
- 2008–09 Bundesliga
- 2008–09 2. Bundesliga
- List of German football transfers winter 2008-09
