= 2008–09 TuS Koblenz season =

TuS Koblenz
2008–09 season
- Manager: Uwe Rapolder
- Stadium: Stadion Oberwerth
- 2. Bundesliga: 14th
- DFB-Pokal: First round
- Average home league attendance: 9,616

The 2008–09 season was the third consecutive season in the second division of German football, the 2. Bundesliga, played by TuS Koblenz, a professional football club based in Koblenz, Rhineland-Palatinate, Germany. The club finished 14th in the 2. Bundesliga despite a three-point deduction, and in addition to the 2. Bundesliga, Tus Koblenz also participated in the DFB-Pokal, where they were eliminated in the first round by FC Oberneuland. The club played their homes matches at Stadion Oberwerth. The season covers the period from 1 July 2008 to 30 June 2009.

== Players ==
=== First-team squad ===
Players' ages as of 17 August 2008.

No.	Name	Nat.	Date of birth (Age)	Place of birth	Signed from	Note
Goalkeepers
1	David Yelldell	(United States)	1 October 1981 (aged 26)	Stuttgart (Note: Though born in Stuttgart, West Germany, Yelldell has represented the United States at international level)	Stuttgarter Kickers	
31	Marcus Rickert	(Germany)	18 February 1984 (aged 24)	Rostock	Kickers Emden	
33	André Weis	(Germany)	30 September 1989 (aged 18)	Boppard	—	
37	Peter Auer	(Germany)	5 July 1971 (aged 37)	Kaiserslautern	1. FC Saarbrücken	
Defenders
3	Frank Wiblishauser	(Germany)	18 October 1977 (aged 30)	Memmingen	St. Gallen	
5	Branimir Bajić	(Bosnia and Herzegovina)	19 October 1979 (aged 28)	Bijeljina	Partizan	
8	Martin Forkel	(Germany)	22 July 1979 (aged 29)	Coburg	Wacker Burghausen	
13	Marko Lomić	(Serbia)	13 September 1983 (aged 24)	Čačak	Partizan	
15	Dominique Ndjeng	(Germany)	4 November 1980 (aged 27)	Bonn	VfL Osnabrück	
18	Andreas Richter	(Germany)	15 September 1977 (aged 30)	Cottbus	Rot-Weiß Erfurt	
22	Cha Du-ri	(South Korea)	25 July 1980 (aged 28)	Frankfurt (Note: Though born in Frankfurt, West Germany, Cha has represented South Korea at international level)	Mainz 05	
24	Matej Mavrič	(Slovenia)	29 January 1979 (aged 29)	Koper	Molde	
25	Alassane Ouédraogo	(Burkina Faso)	7 September 1980 (aged 27)	Boussouma	Rot-Weiß Oberhausen	
28	Lars Bender	(Germany)	8 January 1988 (aged 20)	Koblenz	—	
34	Oliver Laux	(Germany)	26 March 1990 (aged 18)	Lahnstein	—	
Midfielders
4	Rüdiger Ziehl	(Germany)	26 October 1977 (aged 30)	Zweibrücken	Wehen Wiesbaden	
6	Manuel Hartmann	(Germany)	26 March 1984 (aged 24)	Esslingen	Stuttgarter Kickers	
7	Salvatore Gambino	(Germany)	27 November 1983 (aged 24)	Hagen	1. FC Köln	
11	Fatmir Vata	(Albania)	20 September 1971 (aged 36)	Rrëshen	Arminia Bielefeld	
17	Zoltán Stieber	(Hungary)	16 October 1988 (aged 19)	Budapest	Aston Villa	Joined club in January 2009.
19	Ardian Đokaj	(Montenegro)	23 May 1979 (aged 29)	Podgorica	Trabzonspor	
21	Goran Šukalo	(Slovenia)	24 August 1981 (aged 26)	Koper	Alemannia Aachen	
23	Darko Maletić	(Bosnia and Herzegovina)	20 September 1980 (aged 27)	Banja Luka	JSD Partizan	Joined club in January 2009.
26	Evangelos Nessos	(Greece)	27 June 1980 (aged 28)	Solingen	1. FC Köln	
27	Johannes Göderz	(Germany)	27 November 1988 (aged 19)	Kobern-Gondorf	—	
30	Dominik Mader	(Germany)	19 April 1989 (aged 19)	Göppingen	Donzdorf	
32	Patrick Schmidt	(Germany)	17 March 1988 (aged 20)	Oberwesel	—	
38	Michael Stahl	(Germany)	15 September 1907 (aged 100)	Diez	Aalen	Joined club in early 2009
Defenders
9	Njazi Kuqi	(Finland)	25 March 1983 (aged 25)	Vučitrn (Note: Though born in Vučitrn, Yugoslavia, Kuqi has represented Finland at international level)	Carl Zeiss Jena	
10	Emmanuel Krontiris	(Germany)	11 February 1983 (aged 25)	Hanover	Alemannia Aachen	
14	Tayfun Pektürk	(Germany)	13 May 1988 (aged 20)	Wermelskirchen	FC Schalke 04 II	
16	Renaldo Rama	(Albania)	27 January 1990 (aged 18)		Gramozi	Joined club in early 2009.
20	Manuel Fischer	(Germany)	19 September 1989 (aged 18)	Aalen	Joined on loan from VfB Stuttgart in January 2009.	
29	Noureddine Daham	(Algeria)	15 November 1977 (aged 30)	Oran	1. FC Kaiserslautern	
35	Matt Taylor	(United States)	17 October 1981 (aged 26)	Columbus	Hollywood United	
36	César M'Boma	(Cameroon)	18 February 1979 (aged 29)	Douala	Oberneuland	
39	Jan Hawel	(Germany)	2 April 1988 (aged 20)		SG Andernach	

=== Left club during season ===
No.	Name	Pos.	Nat.	Date of birth (Age)	Place of birth	Joined	Note
16	Fabrice Begeorgi	FW	(France)	20 April 1987 (aged 21)	Martigues	Marseille	On loan from Marseille
17	Mustafa Parmak	MF	(Turkey)	19 May 1982 (aged 26)	Stuttgart (Note: Though born in Stuttgart, Parmak retains Turkish citizenship.)	Stuttgarter Kickers	
20	Gabriel Fernández	MF	(Argentina)	22 September 1977 (aged 30)	Bragado	Macará	
23	Matthias Franz	DF	(Germany)	20 March 1985 (aged 23)	Herrenberg	Sonnenhof Großaspach	

== Competitions ==
=== 2. Bundesliga ===
==== League table ====
Pos	Team	Pld	W	D	L	GF	GA	GD	Pts	Promotion, qualification or relegation
12	1860 Munich	34	9	12	13	44	46	−2	39	
13	Hansa Rostock	34	8	14	12	52	53	−1	38	
14	TuS Koblenz	34	11	8	15	47	57	−10	38 (Note: Due to licensing irregularities in the 2007–08 season, TuS Koblenz started with a three point deduction.)	
15	FSV Frankfurt	34	9	11	14	34	47	−13	38	
16	VfL Osnabrück (R)	34	8	12	14	41	60	−19	36	Qualification for relegation play-offs

Source: kicker
Rules for classification: 1) points; 2) goal difference; 3) number of goals scored.
(R) Relegated

==== Matches ====
2. Bundesliga match details
Round	Date	Opponent	Venue	Result F–A	Scorers	Attendance	Ref.
1	17 August 2008	Rot-Weiß Oberhausen	H	3–0	Ziehl 9', Taylor 26', Kuqi 83'	8,425	
2	22 August 2008	FSV Frankfurt	A	0–0		8,172	
3	31 August 2008	SV Wehen Wiesbaden	H	0–0		7,957	
4	14 September 2008	SpVgg Greuther Fürth	A	3–4	Đokaj 31', Krontiris 55', Mavrič 70'	6,650	
5	19 September 2008	FC Augsburg	H	2–1			
6	26 September 2008	VfL Osnabrück	A	0–1			
7	5 October 2008	1. FC Kaiserslautern	H	5–0			
8	19 October 2008	Hansa Rostock	A	0–9			
9	26 October 2008	1. FC Nuremberg	H	1–1			
10	29 October 2008	1860 Munich	A	0–1			
11	2 November 2008	MSV Duisburg	H	1–1			
12	7 November 2008	Alemannia Aachen	A	0–2			
13	16 November 2008	1. FSV Mainz 05	H	0–3			
14	23 November 2008	SC Freiburg	A	1–1			
15	28 November 2008	Rot Weiss Ahlen	H	4–1			
16	7 December 2008	FC St. Pauli	A	2–3			
17	12 December 2008	FC Ingolstadt 04	H	0–1			
18	30 January 2009	Rot-Weiß Oberhausen	A	0–0			
19	6 February 2009	FSV Frankfurt	H	1–3			
20	13 February 2009	SV Wehen Wiesbaden	A	3–1			
21	22 February 2009	SpVgg Greuther Fürth	H	3–0			
22	1 March 2009	FC Augsburg	A	2–0			
23	6 March 2009	VfL Osnabrück	H	3–0			
24	13 March 2009	1. FC Kaiserslautern	A	1–2			
25	20 March 2009	Hansa Rostock	H	1–1			
26	3 April 2009	1. FC Nuremberg	A	0–2			
27	12 April 2009	1860 Munich	H	3–2			
28	19 April 2009	MSV Duisburg	A	3–2			
29	26 April 2009	Alemannia Aachen	H	0–2			
30	3 May 2009	1. FSV Mainz 05	A	0–2			
31	10 May 2009	SC Freiburg	H	2–5			
32	13 May 2009	Rot Weiss Ahlen	A	1–1			
33	17 May 2009	FC St. Pauli	H	2–1			
34	24 May 2009	FC Ingolstadt 04	A	0–4			

=== DFB-Pokal ===
DFB-Pokal match details
Round	Date	Time	Opponent	Venue	Result F–A	Scorers	Attendance	Ref.
First round	10 August 2008	16:00	FC Oberneuland	Away	1–1 (a.e.t.) (4–5 p)	Richter 71'	987	
