= List of German football transfers winter 2008–09 =

This is a list of German football transfers in the winter transfer window 2008–09 by club. Only transfers of the Bundesliga and 2. Bundesliga are included.

== Bundesliga ==
=== FC Bayern Munich ===
In:

Out:

Note: Flags indicate national team as has been defined under FIFA eligibility rules. Players may hold more than one non-FIFA nationality.

No.	Pos.	Nation	Player
13	FW	USA	Landon Donovan (on loan from Los Angeles Galaxy)

No.	Pos.	Nation	Player
2	DF	FRA	Willy Sagnol (retired)
39	MF	GER	Toni Kroos (on loan to Bayer 04 Leverkusen)

=== SV Werder Bremen ===
In:

No.	Pos.	Nation	Player
16	MF	GRE	Alexandros Tziolis (on loan from Panathinaikos)
30	FW	HUN	Marko Futács (from Nancy B)
18	FW	PER	Junior Ross (from Coronel Bolognesi)

Out:

No.	Pos.	Nation	Player
17	MF	BIH	Said Husejinović (on loan to 1. FC Kaiserslautern)
18	FW	CIV	Boubacar Sanogo (on loan to 1899 Hoffenheim)
N/A	FW	PER	Junior Ross (on loan to FSV Frankfurt)
N/A	MF	BRA	Carlos Alberto (on loan to CR Vasco da Gama, previously on loan to Botafogo)

=== FC Schalke 04 ===
In:

No.	Pos.	Nation	Player
26	MF	GER	Danny Latza (from FC Schalke 04 II)
N/A	FW	GER	Marvin Pourie (from Liverpool F.C. Reserves and Academy)
N/A	FW	URU	Nicolás Mezquida (from C.A. Peñarol)

Out:

No.	Pos.	Nation	Player
6	MF	GER	Albert Streit (on loan to Hamburger SV)
7	MF	URU	Gustavo Varela (released)
8	MF	GER	Fabian Ernst (to Beşiktaş J.K.)
11	FW	DEN	Peter Løvenkrands (to Newcastle United F.C.)
15	MF	BRA	Ze Roberto (on loan to Clube de Regatas do Flamengo)
28	MF	GER	Markus Heppke (to Rot-Weiß Oberhausen)
9	FW	URU	Nicolás Mezquida (on loan to C.A. Peñarol)
36	FW	GER	Marvin Pourie (on loan to TSV 1860 München)

=== Hamburger SV ===
In:

No.	Pos.	Nation	Player
8	MF	GER	Albert Streit (on loan from FC Schalke 04)
16	DF	DEN	Michael Gravgaard (on loan from FC Nantes)
24	MF	CMR	Marcel Ndjeng (on loan from Borussia Mönchengladbach)
25	MF	VEN	Tomás Rincón (on loan from Deportivo Táchira)
28	MF	CPV	Mickaël Tavares (from Slavia Prague)
33	GK	MAR	Khalid Sinouh (free agent)

Out:

No.	Pos.	Nation	Player
6	DF	BEL	Vadis Odjidja-Ofoe (to Club Brugge K.V.)
8	MF	NED	Nigel de Jong (to Manchester City)
16	MF	BLR	Anton Putsila (loan return to Dinamo Minsk)
27	MF	BRA	Thiago Neves (to Al-Hilal)
32	MF	GER	Änis Ben-Hatira (on loan to MSV Duisburg)

=== VfL Wolfsburg ===
In:

No.	Pos.	Nation	Player
8	FW	JPN	Yoshito Okubo (from Vissel Kobe)
19	DF	SVK	Peter Pekarík (from MŠK Žilina)

Out:

No.	Pos.	Nation	Player
14	MF	PAR	Jonathan Santana (on loan to San Lorenzo de Almagro)
16	FW	TUR	Mahir Sağlık (on loan to Karlsruher SC)
18	MF	POL	Jacek Krzynówek (to Hannover 96)
19	FW	ROU	Vlad Munteanu (on loan to Arminia Bielefeld)
31	DF	GER	Bernd Korzynietz (to MSV Duisburg, previously on loan from Arminia Bielefeld)
19	FW	SEN	Mame Niang (to Viking FK, previously on loan)

=== VfB Stuttgart ===
In:

No.	Pos.	Nation	Player
6	DF	GER	Georg Niedermeier (on loan from FC Bayern Munich II)
13	MF	GER	Timo Gebhart (from TSV 1860 München)

Out:

No.	Pos.	Nation	Player
13	MF	MEX	Pável Pardo (to Club América)
23	FW	GER	Manuel Fischer (on loan to TuS Koblenz)
38	FW	SRB	Danijel Ljuboja (to VfB Stuttgart II)

=== Bayer 04 Leverkusen ===
In:

No.	Pos.	Nation	Player
19	MF	POL	Tomasz Zdebel (from VfL Bochum)
21	GK	HUN	Gábor Király (on loan from Burnley F.C.)
24	DF	CZE	Michal Kadlec (from Sparta Prague, previously on loan)
29	FW	GRE	Angelos Charisteas (on loan from 1. FC Nürnberg)
39	MF	GER	Toni Kroos (on loan from FC Bayern Munich)

Out:

No.	Pos.	Nation	Player
10	FW	GRE	Theofanis Gekas (on loan to Portsmouth F. C.)
19	MF	GER	Marcel Risse (on loan to 1. FC Nürnberg)
33	MF	GER	Stefan Reinartz (on loan to 1. FC Nürnberg)
37	MF	BUL	Atanas Kurdov (on loan to FC Winterthur)
45	DF	GER	Jens Hegeler (on loan to FC Augsburg)

=== Hannover 96 ===
In:

No.	Pos.	Nation	Player
16	DF	DEN	Leon Andreasen (from Fulham F.C.)
20	MF	POL	Jacek Krzynówek (from VfL Wolfsburg)

Out:

No.	Pos.	Nation	Player
11	MF	HUN	Szabolcs Huszti (to FC Zenit St. Petersburg)

=== Eintracht Frankfurt ===
In:

No.	Pos.	Nation	Player
3	DF	SRB	Nikola Petkovic (from FK Crvena zvezda)
9	FW	CMR	Leonard Kweuke (on loan from DAC Dunajská Streda)

Out:

No.	Pos.	Nation	Player
3	DF	MEX	Aarón Galindo (to Club Deportivo Guadalajara)

=== Hertha BSC Berlin ===
In:

No.	Pos.	Nation	Player
6	DF	CRO	Marko Babić (from Real Betis)
22	DF	ARG	Leandro Cufré (on loan from AS Monaco)

Out:

No.	Pos.	Nation	Player

=== Karlsruher SC ===
In:

No.	Pos.	Nation	Player
11	DF	CRO	Dino Drpic (on loan from Dynamo Zagreb)
22	MF	GER	Marco Engelhardt (from 1. FC Nürnberg)
23	FW	TUR	Mahir Sağlık (on loan from VfL Wolfsburg)
26	MF	ITA	Giovanni Federico (on loan from Borussia Dortmund)

Out:

No.	Pos.	Nation	Player

=== VfL Bochum ===
In:

No.	Pos.	Nation	Player
14	FW	ARG	Diego Klimowicz (from Borussia Dortmund)

Out:

No.	Pos.	Nation	Player
8	MF	POL	Tomasz Zdebel (to Bayer 04 Leverkusen)
13	MF	GER	Danny Fuchs (on loan to 1. FC Kaiserslautern)
N/A	FW	AUT	Marc Sand (to SK Austria Kärnten, previously on loan to FK Austria Wien)

=== Borussia Dortmund ===
In:

No.	Pos.	Nation	Player
22	MF	GER	Kevin-Prince Boateng (on loan from Tottenham Hotspur F.C.)
32	DF	GER	Uwe Hünemeier (from Borussia Dortmund II)

Out:

No.	Pos.	Nation	Player
8	MF	ITA	Giovanni Federico (on loan to Karlsruher SC)
11	MF	RSA	Delron Buckley (to FSV Mainz)
14	DF	SRB	Antonio Rukavina (on loan to TSV 1860 München)
19	FW	ARG	Diego Klimowicz (to VfL Bochum)
21	DF	CRO	Robert Kovač (to NK Dinamo Zagreb)
22	MF	GER	Marc-André Kruska (to Club Brugge K.V.)
31	GK	GER	Lukas Kruse (to FC Augsburg)

=== FC Energie Cottbus ===
In:

No.	Pos.	Nation	Player
25	DF	CZE	Jan Rajnoch (on loan from FK Mladá Boleslav)
26	FW	GER	Nils Petersen (from Carl Zeiss Jena)
27	DF	ROU	Ovidiu Burcă (loan return from Beijing Guoan)
32	FW	BRA	Adi (from SK Austria Kärnten)

Out:

No.	Pos.	Nation	Player
22	FW	GER	Danny Galm (to Stuttgarter Kickers)
24	MF	MKD	Igor Mitreski (on loan to Germinal Beerschot)

=== Arminia Bielefeld ===
In:

No.	Pos.	Nation	Player
3	DF	SRB	Filip Krstić (from AS Livorno)
29	MF	ROU	Vlad Munteanu (on loan from VfL Wolfsburg)
33	MF	SCO	Kevin Kerr (from Arminia Bielefeld II)

Out:

No.	Pos.	Nation	Player
25	MF	RSA	Siyabonga Nkosi (to Maccabi Netanya)
29	MF	GER	Stefan Aigner (to 1860 Munich)
30	DF	GER	Nils Fischer (on loan to Wuppertaler SV Borussia)
N/A	DF	GER	Bernd Korzynietz (to MSV Duisburg, previously on loan at VfL Wolfsburg)

=== Borussia Mönchengladbach ===
In:

No.	Pos.	Nation	Player
8	MF	CZE	Tomáš Galásek (from Banik Ostrava)
30	GK	BEL	Logan Bailly (from K.R.C. Genk)
31	DF	BRA	Dante (from Standard Liège)
32	DF	GER	Christian Dorda (from Borussia M'gladbach II)
37	MF	GER	Tony Jantschke (from Borussia M'gladbach II)
45	DF	CAN	Paul Stalteri (from Tottenham Hotspur F.C.)

Out:

No.	Pos.	Nation	Player
8	MF	DEN	Sebastian Svärd (on loan to FC Hansa Rostock)
10	MF	GER	Sascha Rösler (to TSV 1860 München)
13	DF	GER	Alexander Voigt (to SpVgg Greuther Fürth)
23	MF	CMR	Marcel Ndjeng (on loan to Hamburger SV)

=== TSG 1899 Hoffenheim ===
In:

No.	Pos.	Nation	Player
6	DF	BRA	Fabricio (on loan from Flamengo)
16	FW	GER	Kai Herdling (from Waldhof Mannheim)
18	FW	CIV	Boubacar Sanogo (on loan from SV Werder Bremen)
28	GK	GER	Timo Hildebrand (from Valencia CF)
36	FW	GER	Marco Terrazzino (from 1899 Hoffenheim Youth)

Out:

No.	Pos.	Nation	Player
11	MF	GER	Jochen Seitz (to Alemannia Aachen)
13	DF	HUN	Zsolt Lőw (to FSV Mainz 05)
22	FW	ESP	Francisco Copado (to SpVgg Unterhaching)
30	GK	GER	Thorsten Kirschbaum (to FC Vaduz)

=== 1. FC Köln ===
In:

No.	Pos.	Nation	Player
16	MF	BRA	André (loan return from Nautico)
26	MF	GHA	Derek Boateng (from Beitar Jerusalem)

Out:

No.	Pos.	Nation	Player
15	DF	GER	Tobias Nickenig (to FC Vaduz)
25	DF	GER	Kevin Schöneberg (to Hansa Rostock)
27	DF	GER	Michael Parensen (to 1. FC Union Berlin)

== 2. Bundesliga ==
=== 1. FC Nürnberg ===
In:

No.	Pos.	Nation	Player
2	DF	GER	Dennis Diekmeier (from Werder Bremen II)
3	DF	GER	Stefan Reinartz (on loan from Bayer Leverkusen)
10	FW	SUI	Albert Bunjaku (from FC Rot-Weiß Erfurt)
12	MF	GER	Marcel Risse (on loan from Bayer Leverkusen)
32	DF	SLO	Dominic Maroh (from 1. FC Nürnberg II)
TBA	MF	TUR	İlkay Gündoğan (from VfL Bochum II)

Out:

No.	Pos.	Nation	Player
9	FW	GRE	Angelos Charisteas (on loan to Bayer 04 Leverkusen)
10	MF	GER	Ioannis Masmanidis (to Apollon Limassol)
22	MF	GER	Marco Engelhardt (to Karlsruher SC)
35	FW	GER	Chhunly Pagenburg (to FC Rot-Weiß Erfurt)
37	MF	SVK	Mario Breska (on loan to Enosis Neon Paralimni)

=== FC Hansa Rostock ===
In:

No.	Pos.	Nation	Player
8	MF	HUN	Krisztián Lisztes (from REAC)
14	MF	DEN	Sebastian Svärd (on loan from Borussia Mönchengladbach)
15	FW	FIN	Henri Myntti (from Tampere United)
35	DF	GER	Kevin Schöneberg (from 1. FC Köln)

Out:

No.	Pos.	Nation	Player
2	DF	GER	Dexter Langen (to Hansa Rostock II)
8	MF	MNE	Đorđije Ćetković (to VfL Osnabrück)
11	DF	GER	Robert Lechleiter (to VfR Aalen)
15	DF	GER	Christian Rahn (to SpVgg Greuther Fürth)
26	FW	COD	Addy-Waku Menga (to SV Werder Bremen II)

=== MSV Duisburg ===
In:

No.	Pos.	Nation	Player
2	DF	GER	Bernd Korzynietz (from Arminia Bielefeld, previously on loan at VfL Wolfsburg)
23	MF	GER	Änis Ben-Hatira (on loan from Hamburger SV)

Out:

No.	Pos.	Nation	Player
2	DF	ARG	Fernando Ávalos (to Belenenses)
5	DF	GER	Mounir Chaftar (to Offenbacher Kickers)
14	DF	CMR	Serge Branco (released)
9	MF	GER	Silvio Schröter (to FC Carl Zeiss Jena)
17	MF	GER	Mirko Boland (to Eintracht Braunschweig)
23	FW	GER	Simon Terodde (on loan to Fortuna Düsseldorf)
25	FW	GHA	Salou Ibrahim (to Vejle BK)
27	FW	GHA	Valentine Atem (to PFC Neftchi Baku)

=== 1. FSV Mainz 05 ===
In:

No.	Pos.	Nation	Player
11	DF	RSA	Delron Buckley (from Borussia Dortmund)
24	DF	HUN	Zsolt Lőw (from TSG 1899 Hoffenheim)

Out:

No.	Pos.	Nation	Player
11	FW	CZE	Petr Ruman (to VfR Aalen)

=== SC Freiburg ===
In:

No.	Pos.	Nation	Player
9	FW	BLR	Vitali Rodionov (on loan from BATE Borisov)
25	DF	ITA	Sandro Sirigu (from SSV Ulm)

Out:

No.	Pos.	Nation	Player
10	FW	TUR	Suat Türker (to Kickers Offenbach)
29	MF	GER	Manuel Konrad (on loan to SpVgg Unterhaching)

=== SpVgg Greuther Fürth ===
In:

No.	Pos.	Nation	Player
14	DF	GER	Alexander Voigt (from Borussia Mönchengladbach)
16	DF	GER	Christian Rahn (from Hansa Rostock)

Out:

No.	Pos.	Nation	Player
14	DF	GER	Tom Bertram (to SC Paderborn)
21	MF	GER	Daniel Brückner (to SC Paderborn)
25	FW	GER	Nicolai Müller (on loan to SV Sandhausen)

=== Alemannia Aachen ===
In:

No.	Pos.	Nation	Player
23	FW	BFA	Hervé Oussalé (from Etoile Filante Ouagadougou)
29	MF	GER	Jochen Seitz (from TSG 1899 Hoffenheim)

Out:

No.	Pos.	Nation	Player

=== SV Wehen Wiesbaden ===
In:

No.	Pos.	Nation	Player
2	MF	GER	Fabian Schönheim (on loan from 1. FC Kaiserslautern)
15	MF	GEO	Levan Tskitishvili (from FC Lokomotivi Tbilisi)
38	FW	GER	Marcel Ziemer (on loan from 1. FC Kaiserslautern)

Out:

No.	Pos.	Nation	Player
15	MF	MAR	Abdelaziz Ahanfouf (released)
30	MF	GER	Patrick Bick (to SV Wehen II)
33	FW	CHN	Xie Hui (loan return to Shanghai Shenhua)

=== FC St. Pauli ===
In:

No.	Pos.	Nation	Player
29	FW	MKD	Ermir Zekiri (from FC St. Pauli II)

Out:

No.	Pos.	Nation	Player
29	MF	TUR	Serhat Yapici (to Hacettepe S.K.)

=== TuS Koblenz ===
In:

No.	Pos.	Nation	Player
16	FW	ALB	Renaldo Rama (from KS Gramozi Ersekë)
17	MF	HUN	Zoltán Stieber (from Aston Villa Reserves)
20	FW	GER	Manuel Fischer (on loan from VfB Stuttgart)
23	MF	BIH	Darko Maletić (from FK Partizan)
32	MF	GER	Michael Stahl (to VfR Aalen)

Out:

No.	Pos.	Nation	Player
16	MF	FRA	Fabrice Begeorgi (loan return to Olympique de Marseille)
17	DF	TUR	Mustafa Parmak (to Stuttgarter Kickers)
20	MF	ARG	Gabriel Fernández (to CSD Macará)
23	DF	GER	Matthias Franz (released)

=== TSV 1860 München ===
In:

No.	Pos.	Nation	Player
2	DF	SRB	Antonio Rukavina (on loan from Borussia Dortmund)
10	MF	GER	Sascha Rösler (from Borussia Mönchengladbach)
15	MF	GER	Stefan Aigner (from Arminia Bielefeld)
18	FW	GER	Marvin Pourie (on loan from FC Schalke 04)
24	DF	SRB	Nikola Gulan (on loan from ACF Fiorentina)

Out:

No.	Pos.	Nation	Player
18	MF	GER	Timo Gebhart (to VfB Stuttgart)
24	FW	GER	Mustafa Kučuković (to Grenoble Foot 38)
28	DF	GER	Alexander Eberlein (to SV Sandhausen)

=== VfL Osnabrück ===
In:

No.	Pos.	Nation	Player
10	MF	MNE	Đorđije Ćetković (from FC Hansa Rostock)

Out:

No.	Pos.	Nation	Player
18	MF	GER	Lars Fuchs (to FC Carl Zeiss Jena)

=== 1. FC Kaiserslautern ===
In:

No.	Pos.	Nation	Player
3	MF	BIH	Dario Damjanović (from FC Luch-Energiya Vladivostok)
11	FW	GER	Danny Fuchs (on loan from VfL Bochum)
19	MF	CZE	Jiří Bílek (from FC Slovan Liberec)
25	MF	BIH	Said Husejinović (on loan from SV Werder Bremen)
30	DF	GER	Fabian Müller (from FC Erzgebirge Aue)

Out:

No.	Pos.	Nation	Player
4	DF	GER	Christopher Lamprecht (to 1. FC Kaiserslautern II)
11	FW	GER	Marcel Ziemer (on loan to SV Wehen Wiesbaden)
23	DF	GER	Sven Müller (to FC Erzgebirge Aue)
34	MF	GER	Fabian Schönheim (on loan to SV Wehen Wiesbaden)

=== FC Augsburg ===
In:

No.	Pos.	Nation	Player
1	GK	GER	Lukas Kruse (from Borussia Dortmund)
2	DF	GER	Jens Hegeler (on loan from Bayer 04 Leverkusen)

Out:

No.	Pos.	Nation	Player
32	FW	UKR	Anton Makarenko (on loan to SSV Reutlingen)

=== Rot Weiss Ahlen ===
In:

No.	Pos.	Nation	Player
15	DF	AUS	Dino Djulbic (from Perth Glory)
24	FW	GER	Deniz Naki (on loan from Bayer Leverkusen II)
29	DF	GER	Sebastian Pelzer (from Dynamo Dresden)

Out:

No.	Pos.	Nation	Player
3	DF	GER	Sven Schaffrath (to FC Erzgebirge Aue)

=== Rot-Weiß Oberhausen ===
In:

No.	Pos.	Nation	Player
11	FW	TTO	Jamal Gay (from Joe Public FC)
19	MF	GER	Markus Heppke (from FC Schalke 04)
31	DF	BEL	Olivier De Cock (from Fortuna Düsseldorf)
40	GK	GER	Jonas Deumeland (from VfL Wolfsburg II)

Out:

No.	Pos.	Nation	Player
13	MF	GER	David Müller (to VfR Aalen)
11	FW	GER	Tuncay Aksoy (to SSVg Velbert)

=== FC Ingolstadt 04 ===
In:

No.	Pos.	Nation	Player

Out:

No.	Pos.	Nation	Player
24	FW	GER	Steffen Schneider (on loan to VfR Aalen)
31	GK	GER	Nils Schmadtke (released)

=== FSV Frankfurt ===
In:

No.	Pos.	Nation	Player
27	FW	BLR	Gennadi Bliznyuk (from BATE Borisov)
32	DF	ESP	Kirian (from SE Eivissa-Ibiza)
37	FW	PER	Junior Ross (loan from SV Werder Bremen)

Out:

No.	Pos.	Nation	Player
19	FW	GER	Aziz Bouhaddouz (loan to FC Erzgebirge Aue)

== See also ==
- 2008–09 Bundesliga
- 2008–09 2. Bundesliga
- List of German football transfers summer 2008
