= Tim Peterson =

Tim Peterson may refer to:

- Tim Peterson (baseball)
- Tim Peterson (politician)
- Tim Peterson (swimmer)

== See also ==
- Tim Petersen (born 1986), German footballer
