= Thomas Klasen =

German football manager (born 1983)

Personal information
- Date of birth: 16 September 1983 (age 43)
- Place of birth: Neuwied, West Germany
- Height: 1.82 m (6 ft 0 in)
- Position: Left winger

Team information
- Current team: Eintracht Trier (head coach)

Youth career
- –2002: 1. FC Kaiserslautern
- 2002: TuS Mayen

Senior career*
Years	Team	Apps	(Gls)
2002–2003	TuS Mayen	36	(16)
2003–2006	Eintracht Trier	48	(8)
2006–2007	1. FC Kaiserslautern II	28	(0)
2007–2009	Kickers Emden	36	(3)
2009–2010	SV Elversberg	20	(2)
2010–2013	TuS Koblenz	78	(13)
2013–2017	FC Karbach	56	(22)
Total		302	(64)

Managerial career
- 2016–2017: FC Karbach (player-assistant)
- 2018: Fola Esch
- 2019–2023: 1. FC Köln II (assistant)
- 2023–: Eintracht Trier
- * Club domestic league appearances and goals

Thomas Klasen (born 16 September 1983) is a German professional football manager and former player who is the head coach of Regionalliga Südwest club Eintracht Trier.

== Playing career ==
Klasen began his football career in the youth academies of 1. FC Kaiserslautern and TuS Mayen, where he progressed from the under-19 team to the first team. In the 2003–04 season, he joined Eintracht Trier in the 2. Bundesliga. After two seasons in Germany's second tier, Trier was relegated to the Regionalliga Süd.

In January 2006, Klasen moved to the reserve team of 1. FC Kaiserslautern before signing with Kickers Emden for the 2007–08 season on a contract until 2009. However, his contract was terminated early in January 2009, and he joined SV Elversberg, where he played until June 2010. Klasen then signed with TuS Koblenz in the 3. Liga on a contract lasting until 2012. Following Koblenz' relegation to the Regionalliga, he extended his contract until 2013 but departed afterward.

For the 2013–14 season, Klasen joined FC Karbach in the Rheinlandliga, serving as both a player and assistant coach. He scored 16 goals in his first season and helped the team achieve promotion to the Oberliga in 2015. Klasen retired from playing on 30 June 2017.

== Managerial career ==
In the 2016–17 season, Klasen served as assistant coach at FC Karbach. On 6 February 2018, Luxembourg's top-tier club CS Fola Esch announced his appointment as head coach, with a contract running until 30 June 2020. However, after losing the first two matches of the 2018–19 season, Klasen was dismissed on the second matchday and replaced by Jeff Strasser.

From August 2019 to the end of the 2022–23 season, Klasen worked as an assistant coach for 1. FC Köln's reserves.

In June 2023, Eintracht Trier, recently relegated from the Regionalliga, appointed Klasen as head coach for the 2023–24 season. Under his leadership, the team achieved an immediate return to the Regionalliga, securing the Oberliga championship in dominant fashion with seven matchdays remaining in the season.

== Personal life ==
In 2015, while serving as player-coach for FC Karbach, Klasen pursued a degree in primary education with a focus on German language and sports. He aimed to combine teaching with youth coaching and worked toward advanced coaching certifications, including the DFB-Elite-Jugend-Lizenz.

== Managerial statistics ==
As of match played 30 November 2024

Managerial record by team and tenure
Team	From	To	Record				
Team	From	To	P	W	D	L	Win %
Fola Esch	6 February 2018	16 August 2018	20	9	3	8	45.00
Eintracht Trier	1 July 2023	Present	64	47	5	12	73.44
Total			84	56	8	20	66.67

== Honours ==
SV Elversberg

- Saarland Cup: 2008–09, 2009–10

FC Karbach

- Rheinlandliga: 2014–15
