= Brian Baloyi =

South African footballer (born 1974)

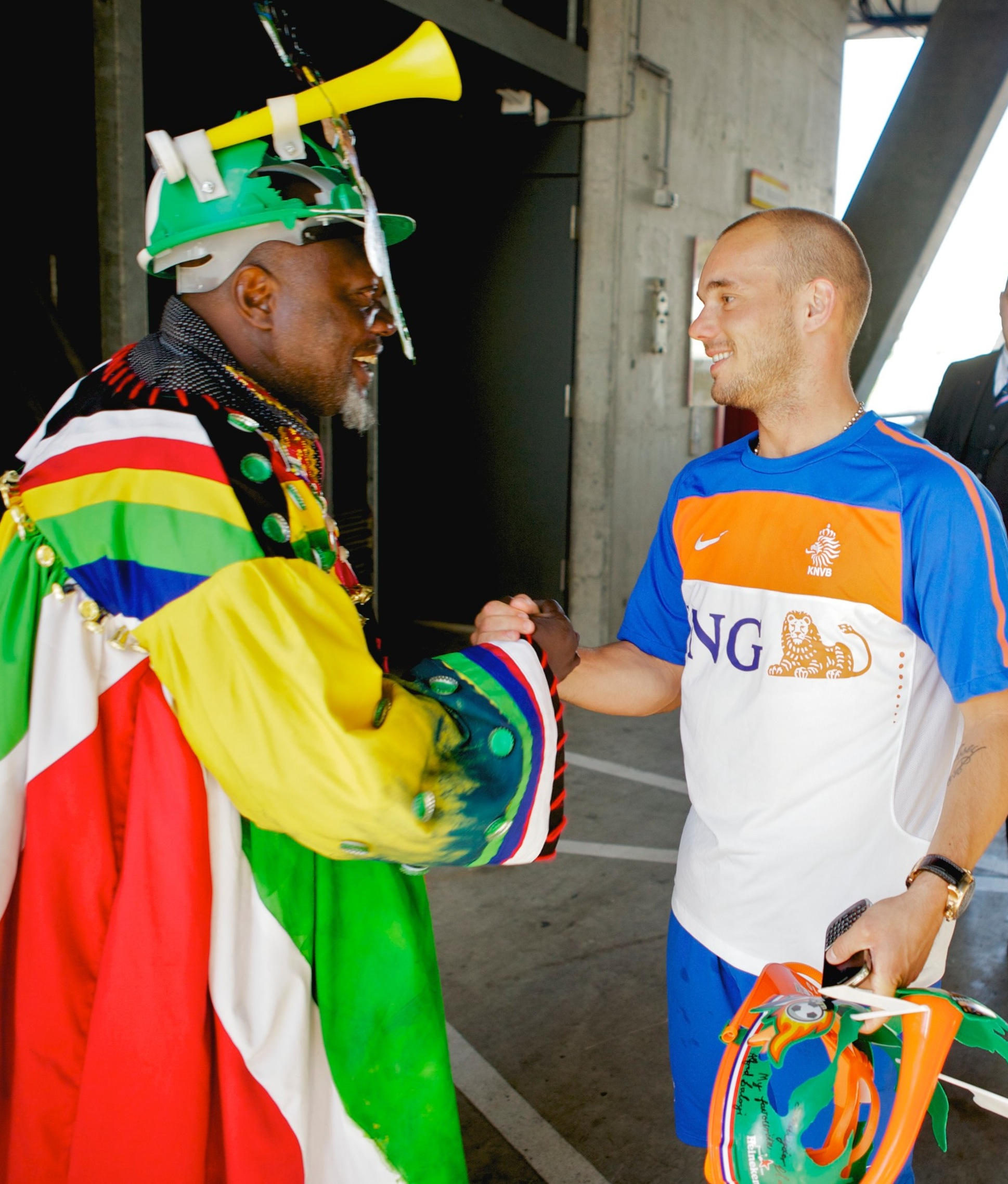
- Baloyi shaking hands with Wesley Sneijder in 2010

Personal information
- Full name: Brian Bafana Baloyi
- Date of birth: 16 March 1974 (age 52)
- Place of birth: Alexandra, Gauteng, South Africa
- Height: 1.86 m (6 ft 1 in)
- Position: Goalkeeper

Youth career
- Alexandra United
- Longhorn FC
- Wits University
- Highlands Park
- 1986–1990: Balfour Park
- 1990–1993: Kaizer Chiefs

Senior career*
Years	Team	Apps	(Gls)
1993–2004	Kaizer Chiefs	338	(0)
2004–2010	Mamelodi Sundowns	75	(0)

International career^{‡}
1993–1994	South Africa U-20	5	(0)
1995–1997	South Africa U-23	9	(0)
1997–2009	South Africa	24	(0)
- * Club domestic league appearances and goals as of 22 May 2011 ‡ National team caps and goals as of 22 May 2011

Brian Baloyi (born 16 March 1974) is a South African former soccer player who played as a goalkeeper.

Baloyi made his professional debut in 1993. He joined league rivals Mamelodi Sundowns in 2004 after playing for Kaizer Chiefs for over a decade. He is commonly nicknamed "Spiderman".

== International career ==
Baloyi made his debut against the Netherlands on 4 June 1997. In the match, which ended in a 2-0 loss for the Bafana Bafana, he witnessed a long-range goal by Giovanni van Bronckhorst. He played for South Africa national football team and was in part of the squad that travelled to Saudi Arabia for the 1997 FIFA Confederations Cup where he played their final match of the group stage in a 4–3 loss against Uruguay. He also played in the 1998 Africa Cup of Nations, the 1998 FIFA World Cup and the 2000 Summer Olympics.

Despite retirement claims, Baloyi was called up by Joel Santana for the 2009 FIFA Confederations Cup but he was just Santana's third choice behind Itumeleng Khune and Rowen Fernandez.

== Personal life ==
Baloyi's wife, Phungi, is a breast cancer survivor. She was one of the mourners at the funeral of the wife of Lucas Radebe, Feziwe, who were handed pink ribbons to wear to raise awareness of cancer. He has a son named Kgosi.
