= Rowen Fernández =

South African soccer player (born 1978)

Personal information
- Date of birth: 28 February 1978 (age 48)
- Place of birth: Springs, South Africa
- Height: 1.89 m (6 ft 2 in)
- Position: Goalkeeper

Youth career
- Benoni Northerns
- Wits University

Senior career*
Years	Team	Apps	(Gls)
1996–2001	Wits University	100	(0)
2001–2007	Kaizer Chiefs	114	(2)
2007–2011	Arminia Bielefeld	16	(0)
2011–2014	SuperSport United	30	(0)
2014	Bidvest Wits	2	(0)

International career
2004–2009	South Africa	23	(0)
- * Club domestic league appearances and goals

Rowen Fernández (born 28 February 1978) is a South African former professional soccer player who played as a goalkeeper.

== Club career ==
=== Kaizer Chiefs ===
Following a great season with The Students, Fernández was signed by Kaizer Chiefs from Wits University in 2001 along with midfielder Stanton Fredericks. Fernández was to be an understudy to Brian Baloyi, who was on the verge of landing a lucrative contract in Europe.

Fernández initially struggled to break into the first team, as Baloyi put up solid performances week in and week out. The big break finally came, when he made his debut in the Vodacom Challenge against Ghanaian side Hearts of Oak at Royal Bafokeng Stadium on 30 June 2001. Chiefs won the game 2–0. He made his PSL debut for Chiefs in a 2–1 win against Classic on 22 August 2001.

"Spider", as he is known due to his amazing love for creepy crawlies (snakes and spiders), was hospitalised in April 2003 after he was bitten by one of his spiders. He had also battled to command a first team place in the same season and only got a run in the 5–0 ABSA Cup first round victory against Sporting at Ellis Park.

However, the 2003–04 season started off very well for Fernández who was handed the number one jersey as Baloyi struggled with a niggling injury.

The former national under-23 star began his playing career at Benoni amateur side Benoni Northerns before joining Wits where he caught the eye of the under-23 selectors. He has six under-23 caps. During the 2006–07 season he scored two goals.

He kicked his way into the history books in February 2007 when he pounced on the rebound, after Brian Baloyi of Mamelodi Sundowns could only parry his retaken spot kick and knocked the ball home from close range. The fact that Rowen had missed the kick and scored on the rebound meant that his thirty second-minute equaliser against Sundowns was not classified as a penalty, but instead it was recorded as a goal scored from open play. The other goal resulted from a spot kick in a match against his former club Wits in September 2006.

=== Arminia Bielefeld ===
Fernández joined German Bundesliga side Arminia Bielefeld in June 2007 on a free transfer after being out of contract with Chiefs to team up with former Chiefs coach Ernst Middendorp who then coached Arminia. Fernández lost his place as first choice goalkeeper to Dennis Eilhoff after injury. On 1 January 2011, during the January transfer window, Fernández left Arminia Bielefeld for SuperSport United.

== International career ==
Fernández made his full international debut for the South Africa national team in a 2–0 win against Tunisia in August 2004. He was chosen as second choice goalkeeper alongside with Itumeleng Khune and Brian Baloyi for 2009 FIFA Confederations Cup by coach Joel Santana then he had hoped to be a part of his country's squad at the 2010 FIFA World Cup to be held in South Africa, but was omitted from the final 23 by coach Carlos Alberto Parreira in favour of Itumeleng Khune, Moeneeb Josephs and Shu-Aib Walters.
