= Philipp Langen =

German footballer

Personal information
- Full name: Philipp Langen
- Date of birth: 2 July 1986 (age 40)
- Place of birth: Lahnstein, West Germany
- Height: 1.83 m (6 ft 0 in)
- Positions: Attacking midfielder; left midfielder

Youth career
- –2000: SG Rheindoerfer
- 2000–2003: TuS Koblenz

Senior career*
Years	Team	Apps	(Gls)
2003–2008	TuS Koblenz	100	(6)
2008–2011	SpVgg Greuther Fürth	2	(0)
2008–2011	SpVgg Greuther Fürth II	18	(13)
2009–2010	→ TuS Koblenz (loan)	8	(0)
2011–2013	TuS Koblenz	7	(0)

International career
	Germany U-20	5	(0)
- * Club domestic league appearances and goals as of 23:10, 14 November 2012 (UTC)

Philipp Langen (born 2 July 1986 in Lahnstein, West Germany) is a German former footballer.

== Career ==
The midfielder joined the youth team of TuS Koblenz in the age of 14, playing his first match for the professional team in the German Oberliga Südwest (4th division) aged only 17. After the ascent to Regionalliga in 2004 he immediately became a starter in his team, playing 63 matches and scoring five goals in two seasons, finally celebrating the club's promotion to 2nd Bundesliga for the 2006–07 season. He joined Greuther Fürth in 2008 and turned back for one season on loan to TuS Koblenz on 19 June 2009.

== Honours ==
- Rheinlandpokal 2005 and 2006 with TuS Koblenz
