= Marvin Braun =

German former football player

Personal information
- Date of birth: 11 January 1982 (age 44)
- Place of birth: Ludwigsburg, West Germany
- Height: 1.81 m (5 ft 11 in)
- Position: Forward

Youth career
- TSV Asperg
- –1996: SGV Freiberg
- 1996–2001: VfB Stuttgart

Senior career*
Years	Team	Apps	(Gls)
2001–2002	VfB Stuttgart II	29	(5)
2001–2002	VfB Stuttgart	1	(0)
2002–2004	Stuttgarter Kickers	56	(11)
2004–2005	FC Augsburg	19	(4)
2005–2006	Stuttgarter Kickers	21	(6)
2006–2008	FC St. Pauli	52	(11)
2008–2009	VfL Osnabrück	26	(4)
2009–2010	Wuppertaler SV	22	(0)
Total		226	(41)
- * Club domestic league appearances and goals

Marvin Braun (born 11 January 1982) is a German former professional footballer who played as a forward. He made his debut on the professional league level in the Bundesliga for VfB Stuttgart on 14 April 2002 when he came on as a substitute for Christian Tiffert in the 88th minute in a game against FC Energie Cottbus.
