= Marcel Ndjeng =

Cameroonian footballer (born 1982)

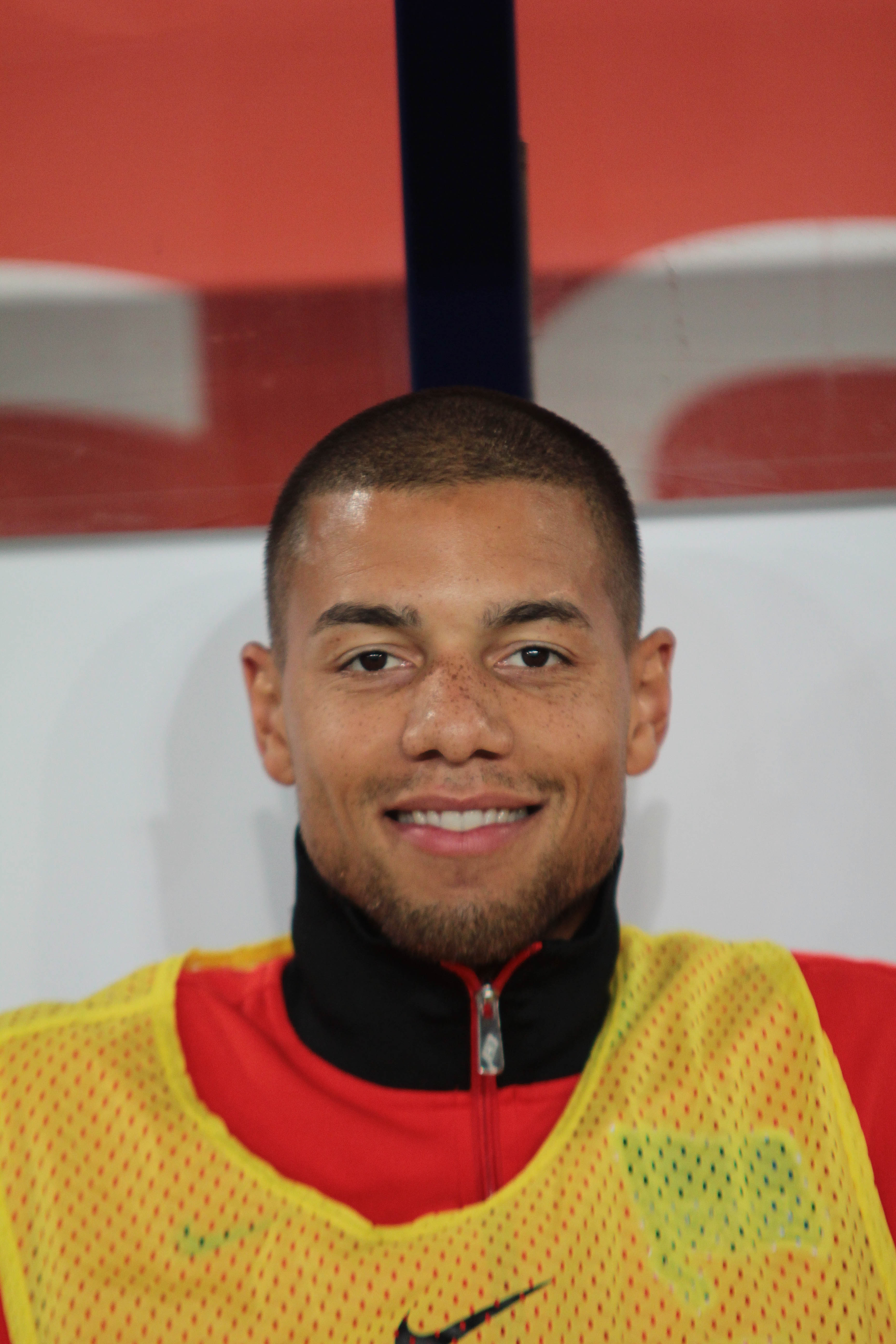
- Ndjeng with Hertha BSC in 2012

Personal information
- Full name: Marcel Biyouha Ndjeng
- Date of birth: 6 May 1982 (age 44)
- Place of birth: Bonn, West Germany
- Height: 1.80 m (5 ft 11 in)
- Position: Midfielder

Youth career
- 1988–1995: Fortuna Bonn
- 1995–1996: Bonner SC
- 1996–2001: 1. FC Köln

Senior career*
Years	Team	Apps	(Gls)
2001–2004	1. FC Köln II	65	(12)
2004–2005	Fortuna Düsseldorf	34	(3)
2005–2006	SC Paderborn	34	(9)
2006–2007	Arminia Bielefeld	10	(2)
2007	→ Arminia Bielefeld II	6	(1)
2007–2008	Borussia Mönchengladbach	39	(4)
2008–2009	→ Borussia Mönchengladbach II	1	(0)
2009	→ Hamburger SV (loan)	2	(0)
2009	→ Hamburger SV II (loan)	5	(3)
2009–2012	FC Augsburg	61	(6)
2012–2015	Hertha BSC	61	(5)
2015–2016	SC Paderborn	19	(1)
2016–2018	Atlético Baleares	42	(3)
Total		379	(38)

International career
2008–2011	Cameroon	5	(0)
- * Club domestic league appearances and goals

Marcel Biyouha Ndjeng (born 6 May 1982) is a former professional footballer who played as a midfielder. Born in West Germany, he played for the Cameroon national team at International level. He is the brother of Dominique Ndjeng, who also played football professionally.

== Club career ==
In January 2009, Ndjeng joined Hamburger SV on loan from Borussia Mönchengladbach after a successful training session with the club. On 28 June 2009, he signed a two-year contract with FC Augsburg.

== International career ==
Marcel Ndjeng was born in Germany to a Cameroonian father and German mother. He was called up by Otto Pfister in May 2008, although he would not make his debut until 25 May 2010, in a friendly match versus Georgia.

== Personal ==
His brother Dominique Ndjeng was also a professional footballer.
