= Jan Hawel =

German footballer

Personal information
- Full name: Jan Hawel
- Date of birth: 2 April 1988 (age 38)
- Place of birth: Andernach, West Germany
- Height: 1.91 m (6 ft 3 in)
- Position: Centre-forward

Team information
- Current team: SG Andernach
- Number: 9

Youth career
- –2005: SG Andernach
- 2005–2006: TuS Koblenz

Senior career*
Years	Team	Apps	(Gls)
2006–2010	TuS Koblenz II	36	(8)
2009–2012	TuS Koblenz	44	(1)
2012–2014	Rot-Weiss Koblenz	65	(19)
2014–	SG Andernach	166	(75)
- * Club domestic league appearances and goals as of 13:28, 18 February 2021 (UTC)

Jan Hawel (born 2 April 1988) is a German footballer who plays as a centre-forward for SG Andernach.

== Career ==
Hawel made his professional debut for TuS Koblenz in the 2. Bundesliga on 3 May 2009, coming on as a substitute in the 78th minute for Salvatore Gambino in the 0–2 away loss against Mainz 05.
