= Steffen Schneider =

German footballer

Personal information
- Date of birth: 9 June 1988 (age 38)
- Place of birth: Haiger, Germany
- Height: 1.89 m (6 ft 2 in)
- Position: Striker

Team information
- Current team: SSC Juno Burg

Youth career
- TSG Wieseck
- JSG Sinn
- –2007: FC Bayern Munich

Senior career*
Years	Team	Apps	(Gls)
2007–2010	FC Ingolstadt 04	24	(0)
2009	→ VfR Aalen (loan)	8	(0)
2010	FC Bayern Alzenau	14	(1)
2010–2011	Freier TuS	28	(11)
2011–2014	FC Gerolfing	83	(45)
2014–2017	SC Waldgirmes	32	(7)
2017–	SSC Juno Burg	86	(63)
- * Club domestic league appearances and goals as of 12:01, 30 January 2021 (UTC)

Steffen Schneider (born 9 June 1988) is a German footballer who plays for SSC Juno Burg.

== Career ==
He made his debut on the professional league level in the 2. Bundesliga for FC Ingolstadt 04 on 16 November 2008 when he came on as a substitute in the 68th minute in a game against 1. FC Nürnberg.
