= Michael Müller (footballer, born 1989) =

German footballer

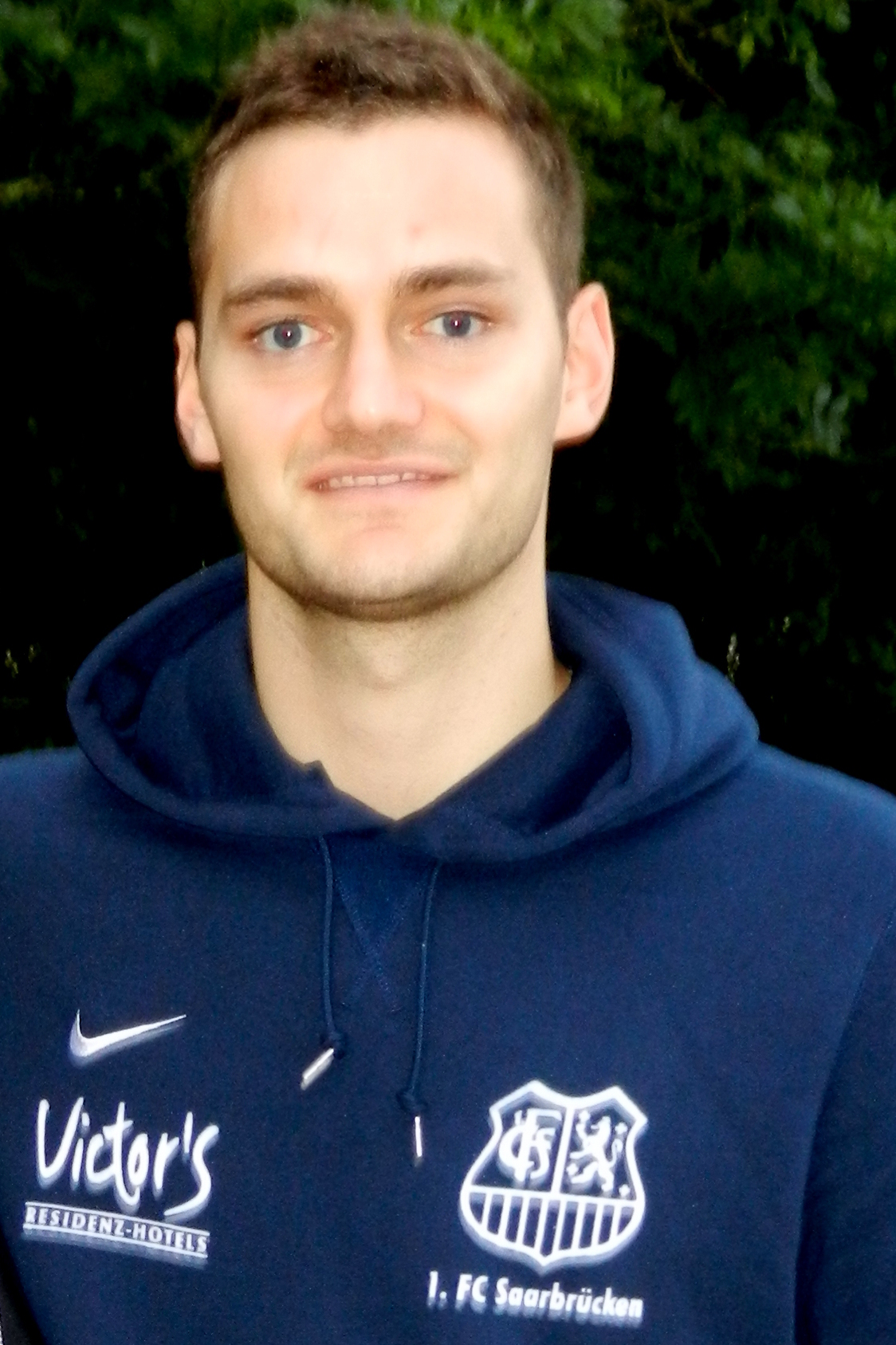
- Müller with 1. FC Saarbrücken in 2012

Personal information
- Date of birth: 16 August 1989 (age 37)
- Place of birth: Gengenbach, West Germany
- Height: 1.94 m (6 ft 4 in)
- Position: Goalkeeper

Youth career
- Offenburger FV
- SV Zunsweier
- SSV Schwaibach
- –2007: SC Freiburg

Senior career*
Years	Team	Apps	(Gls)
2007–2009	SC Freiburg II	22	(0)
2008–2010	SC Freiburg	0	(0)
2009–2010	→ 1. FC Saarbrücken (loan)	11	(0)
2010–2012	VfL Wolfsburg II	19	(0)
2012–2014	1. FC Saarbrücken	11	(0)
2014	SC Freiburg II	0	(0)
Total		63	(0)
- * Club domestic league appearances and goals

Michael Müller (born 16 August 1989) is a German former professional footballer who played as a goalkeeper.
