= Anel Džaka =

German footballer (born 1980)

Personal information
- Date of birth: 19 September 1980 (age 46)
- Place of birth: Sarajevo, SR Bosnia and Herzegovina, SFR Yugoslavia
- Height: 1.78 m (5 ft 10 in)
- Position: Attacking midfielder

Team information
- Current team: Bayer Leverkusen (youth scout)

Youth career
- 1992–1993: Alemannia Aachen
- 1993–1995: Germania Dürwiß
- 1995–1998: Bayer Leverkusen

Senior career*
Years	Team	Apps	(Gls)
1998–2003	Bayer Leverkusen II	97	(23)
2000–2003	Bayer Leverkusen	3	(0)
2003–2004	VfL Osnabrück	27	(4)
2004–2008	TuS Koblenz	109	(32)
2008–2011	1. FC Kaiserslautern	28	(3)
2010	→ TuS Koblenz (loan)	12	(1)
2012	Rot-Weiß Oberhausen	16	(2)
2012–2015	TuS Koblenz	79	(8)
Total		371	(73)

International career
2001	Germany U21	1	(0)

Managerial career
- 2016–2018: TuS Koblenz (youth)
- 2018–2021: TuS Koblenz
- * Club domestic league appearances and goals

Anel Džaka (born 19 September 1980) is a former professional footballer who played as a midfielder, and is currently youth scout at Bayer Leverkusen. Born in Yugoslavia, he represented Germany at youth level.

== Career ==
Džaka began his career with Bayer 04 Leverkusen, where he made three Bundesliga appearances in three years as well as making it onto the bench for the 2002 UEFA Champions League Final. He left in 2003, joining VfL Osnabrück, where he spent just one season before joining TuS Koblenz. He was a popular figure at Koblenz, captaining the side and helping them earn promotion to the 2. Bundesliga in 2006. In 2008, he joined Koblenz's local rivals 1. FC Kaiserslautern. In February 2010, he returned on loan to TuS Koblenz. He was released by Kaiserslautern in June 2011, and spent half a season without a club before signing for Rot-Weiß Oberhausen. Six months later, after Oberhausen were relegated, he returned to TuS Koblenz for a third time.
