= Benjamin Weigelt =

German footballer (born 1982)

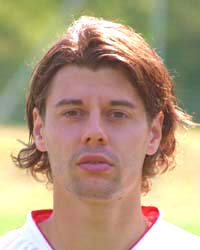
- Weigelt with Mainz 05 in 2006

Personal information
- Date of birth: 4 September 1982 (age 44)
- Place of birth: Bocholt, West Germany
- Position: Left-back

Youth career
- 1995–1996: KFC Uerdingen 05
- 1996–2000: Rot-Weiss Essen

Senior career*
Years	Team	Apps	(Gls)
2001–2004	Rot-Weiss Essen	89	(2)
2004–2007	Mainz 05	54	(1)
2007–2008	Alemannia Aachen	10	(0)
2008	→ 1. FC Kaiserslautern (loan)	12	(0)
2008–2009	FC St. Pauli	14	(0)
2009–2010	SV Wehen Wiesbaden	28	(0)
2010–2011	Hessen Kassel	27	(0)
2012–2017	Rot-Weiss Oberhausen	154	(7)
Total		388	(10)

International career
2005	Germany Team 2006	1	(0)
- * Club domestic league appearances and goals

Benjamin Weigelt (born 4 September 1982) is a German retired professional footballer who played as a left-back.

== Career ==
Born in Bocholt, North Rhine-Westphalia, Weigelt played for former Bundesliga club KFC Uerdingen 05 as a youth. After four years there, he left the club and went to Rot-Weiß Essen where he also signed his first professional contract. After three years with many games he played he became the chance to sign with newly promoted 1. FSV Mainz 05. He competed for a place in the starting formation with Marco Rose, and finally won the race for it.

After another three years and Mainz' promotion to the 2. Bundesliga he decided to change the club and went to the rivals of Alemannia Aachen. The first six months were disappointing for Weigelt with only ten appearances on the field so that he and the club decided to loan him to 1. FC Kaiserslautern.

Once the coach decided not to use him on the field he left for league rivals FC St. Pauli in summer 2008 and left Hamburg after just on year on 3 June 2009 to sign with SV Wehen Wiesbaden. On 28 June 2010, Weigelt signed a two-year deal to play for KSV Hessen Kassel, but left the club after one year. After six months without a club, he signed for RW Oberhausen in January 2012.
