= Evangelos Nessos =

Greek/German footballer and manager

Personal information
- Date of birth: 27 June 1978 (age 48)
- Place of birth: Solingen, West Germany
- Height: 1.80 m (5 ft 11 in)
- Position: Midfielder

Youth career
- 1984–1987: Britannia Solingen
- 1987–1900: Union Solingen
- 1990–1996: Bayer Leverkusen
- 1996–1998: PAOK FC

Senior career*
Years	Team	Apps	(Gls)
1998–1999	TuSpo Richrath		
1999–2002	1. FC Köln II	100	(4)
2002–2004	1. FC Köln	6	(0)
2004–2009	TuS Koblenz	90	(5)
Total		196	(9)

Managerial career
- 2012: TuS Koblenz (caretaker)
- 2013–2014: TuS Koblenz
- 2016–: 1. FC Köln U15 II
- * Club domestic league appearances and goals

Evangelos Nessos (born 27 June 1978) is a Greek former footballer and most recently manager of TuS Koblenz. He also holds German citizenship.

== Coaching career ==
=== Early career ===
Nessos became interim head coach on 11 September 2012 after Michael Dämgen was sacked by TuS Koblenz. Peter Neustädter eventually became the new permanent head coach on 17 September 2012. Neustädter was sacked on 21 August 2013 and Nessos was given a contract to the end of the season. He was sacked on 8 December 2014.

=== Coaching record ===
As of 8 December 2014

Team	From	To	Record								
Team	From	To	G	W	D	L	GF	GA	GD	Win %	Ref.
TuS Koblenz	11 September 2012	17 September 2012	1	0	1	0	1	1	+0	0.00	
TuS Koblenz	21 August 2013	8 December 2014	51	13	13	25	49	73	−24	25.49	
Total			52	13	14	25	50	74	−24	25.00	—
