= Dennis Eilhoff =

German former football goalkeeper

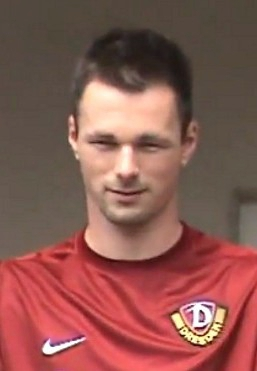
- Eilhoff in 2011

Personal information
- Date of birth: 31 July 1982 (age 44)
- Place of birth: Witten, West Germany
- Height: 1.90 m (6 ft 3 in)
- Position: Goalkeeper

Youth career
- 1990–1994: SC Delbrück
- 1994–1996: TuS Paderborn-Neuhaus
- 1996–2000: Arminia Bielefeld

Senior career*
| Years | Team | Apps | (Gls) |
| 2000–2011 | Arminia Bielefeld | 99 | (0) |
| 2006–2008 | → TuS Koblenz (loan) | 50 | (0) |
| 2011–2012 | Dynamo Dresden | 9 | (0) |
| Total | | 158 | (0) |
- * Club domestic league appearances and goals

Dennis Eilhoff (born 31 July 1982) is a German former professional footballer who played as a football goalkeeper.

== Career ==
=== Youth ===
Born in Witten, West Germany, Eilhoff began his career with SC Delbrück in 1990. Four years later he played for TuS Paderborn-Neuhaus, the present SC Paderborn 07. In 1996, Eilhoff moved to Arminia Bielefeld.

During his youth he belonged to the German national under-17 team.

=== Club career ===
Starting in 2000, Eilhoff was in the squad of Arminia Bielefeld. His first appearances were in the 2000–01 season of the 2. Bundesliga. He could never stand out against the regular goalkeeper Mathias Hain with the result that he only came to four matches in all before 2006 including two matches in the 2005–06 season of the Bundesliga. In the 2006–07 season, he was loaned out to TuS Koblenz for two years in the 2. Bundesliga. Starting in the 2006–07 season, he was the regular goalkeeper where he passed every match except one. In the 2008–09 season, he returned to Arminia Bielefeld. Due to injury of the first goalkeeper Rowen Fernandez, Eilhoff could play for the most part in the first half of this season. By his performance he stayed first choice despite the convalescence of Fernandez. On this account he renewed his contract with Arminia in February 2009 until 2011. Even after the relegation to the 2. Bundesliga he stayed loyal to his club.

In June 2011, Eilhoff left Arminia Bielefeld and signed a one-year-contract with Dynamo Dresden, where he made his debut on 15 July 2011 against Energie Cottbus. He was released by Dynamo after one season.

== Personal ==
Eilhoff completed his Abitur at the Nepomucenum Gymnasium of Rietberg in 2001. Since his retirement from professional football, Eilhoff works as a police officer.

== Career statistics ==
Appearances and goals by club, season and competition
| Club | Season | League | | | Cup | | Total | |
| Club | Season | Division | Apps | Goals | Apps | Goals | Apps | Goals |
|---|---|---|---|---|---|---|---|---|
| Arminia Bielefeld | 2000–01 | 2. Bundesliga | 2 | 0 | 1 | 0 | 3 | 0 |
| Arminia Bielefeld | 2001–02 | 2. Bundesliga | 0 | 0 | 0 | 0 | 0 | 0 |
| Arminia Bielefeld | 2002–03 | Bundesliga | 0 | 0 | 0 | 0 | 0 | 0 |
| Arminia Bielefeld | 2003–04 | 2. Bundesliga | 1 | 0 | 0 | 0 | 1 | 0 |
| Arminia Bielefeld | 2004–05 | Bundesliga | 0 | 0 | 0 | 0 | 0 | 0 |
| Arminia Bielefeld | 2005–06 | Bundesliga | 2 | 0 | 1 | 0 | 3 | 0 |
| Arminia Bielefeld | 2008–09 | Bundesliga | 34 | 0 | 2 | 0 | 36 | 0 |
| Arminia Bielefeld | 2009–10 | 2. Bundesliga | 32 | 0 | 1 | 0 | 33 | 0 |
| Arminia Bielefeld | 2010–11 | 2. Bundesliga | 28 | 0 | 2 | 0 | 30 | 0 |
| Arminia Bielefeld | Total | | 99 | 0 | 7 | 0 | 106 | 0 |
| TuS Koblenz (loan) | 2006–07 | 2. Bundesliga | 17 | 0 | 0 | 0 | 17 | 0 |
| TuS Koblenz (loan) | 2007–08 | 2. Bundesliga | 33 | 0 | 2 | 0 | 35 | 0 |
| TuS Koblenz (loan) | Total | | 50 | 0 | 2 | 0 | 52 | 0 |
| Dynamo Dresden | 2011–12 | Bundesliga | 9 | 0 | 1 | 0 | 10 | 0 |
| Career total | | | 158 | 0 | 10 | 0 | 168 | 0 |
