= Radek Špiláček =

Czech footballer (born 1980)

Personal information
- Date of birth: 10 January 1980 (age 46)
- Place of birth: Opava, Czech Republic
- Height: 1.85 m (6 ft 1 in)
- Position: Midfielder

Youth career
- Sokol Kylešovice

Senior career*
Years	Team	Apps	(Gls)
1997–2000	SFC Opava	38	(1)
2000–2006	SK Sigma Olomouc	131	(1)
2006–2008	1899 Hoffenheim	31	(0)
2008–2009	FSV Frankfurt	10	(0)
2009–2010	FSV Frankfurt II		
2010–2011	SV Wilhelmshaven	21	(3)
2011–2014	SSV Jeddeloh		

International career
2000–2001	Czech Republic U21	7	(0)
- * Club domestic league appearances and goals

Radek Špiláček (born 10 January 1980) is a Czech former professional footballer who played as a midfielder.
