= Sören Dreßler =

German footballer

Personal information
- Date of birth: 26 December 1975 (age 50)
- Place of birth: Schleiz, Bezirk Gera, East Germany
- Height: 1.84 m (6 ft 0 in)
- Position: Defender

Youth career
- BSG Fortschritt Gefell
- FSV Schleiz
- Carl Zeiss Jena

Senior career*
Years	Team	Apps	(Gls)
–2000	SpVgg Bayern Hof		
2000–2002	SSV Reutlingen	16	(0)
2002–2008	FC Augsburg	137	(6)
2008–2009	FC Ingolstadt 04	10	(0)
2010	FC Ingolstadt II	5	(0)
2020	SSV Anhausen III	1	(0)

Managerial career
- 2011–2013: SSV Anhausen
- 2013–2015: Kissinger SC
- 2015–2019: Schwaben Augsburg
- * Club domestic league appearances and goals

Sören Dreßler (born 26 December 1975) is a former German footballer.

== Coaching career ==
In 2011, he took over the coaching position at SSV Anhausen in the Kreisliga Schwaben-Augsburg. In summer 2013, he became the new head coach of Kissinger SC in Augsburg.

Ahead of the 2015/16 season, Dreßler was appointed head coach of TSV Schwaben Augsburg. He left the position in summer 2019.

In March 2020, 44-year old Dreßler played one game for the third team of his former club, SSV Anhausen.
