= Patrick Schmidt (footballer, born 1988) =

German footballer

Personal information
- Date of birth: 17 March 1988 (age 38)
- Place of birth: Rheinböllen, West Germany
- Height: 1.78 m (5 ft 10 in)
- Position: Midfielder

Youth career
- –2002: TuS Rheinböllen
- 2002–2004: Hassia Bingen
- 2004–2008: TuS Koblenz

Senior career*
Years	Team	Apps	(Gls)
2008–2011	TuS Koblenz	2	(0)
2011–2013	FC Karbach	12	(0)
Total		14	(0)
- * Club domestic league appearances and goals

Patrick Schmidt (born 17 March 1988) is a German former footballer who played as a midfielder.
