= Johannes Göderz =

German footballer

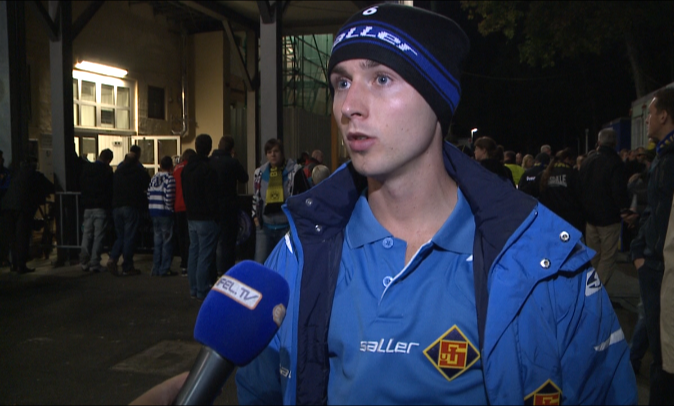

Personal information
- Date of birth: 27 November 1988 (age 37)
- Place of birth: Kobern-Gondorf, West Germany
- Height: 1.78 m (5 ft 10 in)
- Position: Midfielder

Team information
- Current team: FC Karbach
- Number: 6

Youth career
- SV Untermosel
- –2006: TuS Mayen
- 2006–2007: TuS Koblenz

Senior career*
Years	Team	Apps	(Gls)
2007–2008	TuS Koblenz II		
2008–2015	TuS Koblenz	81	(0)
2015–	FC Karbach	130	(7)
- * Club domestic league appearances and goals as of 8 February 2021

Johannes Göderz (born 27 November 1988 in Kobern-Gondorf) is a German football player, who plays for FC Karbach.

He played for TuS Koblenz. He made his debut on the professional league level in the 2. Bundesliga for TuS Koblenz on 4 May 2008, when he came on as a substitute in the 75th minute in a game against SV Wehen Wiesbaden.
