= Dominique Ndjeng =

German footballer

Personal information
- Date of birth: 4 November 1980 (age 45)
- Place of birth: Bonn, West Germany
- Height: 1.82 m (6 ft 0 in)
- Position: Defender

Youth career
- 1987–1994: Fortuna Bonn
- 1994–1995: Bonner SC

Senior career*
Years	Team	Apps	(Gls)
1995–2004	1. FC Köln II	48	(0)
2004–2006	Rot Weiss Ahlen	25	(0)
2006–2008	VfL Osnabrück	43	(0)
2008–2010	TuS Koblenz	18	(0)
2010–2012	Preußen Münster	25	(2)
2012–2013	Fortuna Köln	18	(2)
Total		157	(4)
- * Club domestic league appearances and goals

Dominique Ndjeng (born 4 November 1980) is a German former footballer who played as a defender. He also holds Cameroonian citizenship. His brother Marcel Ndjeng is also a professional footballer.
