= Dominik Mader =

German footballer

Personal information
- Date of birth: 19 April 1989 (age 37)
- Place of birth: Göppingen, West Germany
- Height: 1.83 m (6 ft 0 in)
- Position: Midfielder

Team information
- Current team: Türk SV Donzdorf
- Number: 8

Youth career
- –2004: 1. FC Eislingen
- 2004–2006: VfL Kirchheim/Teck
- 2006–2007: SSV Ulm 1846

Senior career*
Years	Team	Apps	(Gls)
2007–2008	1. FC Donzdorf		
2008–2009	TuS Koblenz	2	(0)
2009–2010	TSV Crailsheim	27	(3)
2010–2011	SV Göppingen		
2011–2012	VfR Aalen II		
2012–2019	1. FC Heiningen	173	(55)
2019–2020	SV Ebersbach	15	(5)
2020–	Türk SV Donzdorf	4	(0)
- * Club domestic league appearances and goals as of 18 February 2021

Dominik Mader (born 19 April 1989 in Göppingen) is a German footballer who plays for Türkischer SV Donzdorf.

== Career ==
Mader made his debut on the professional league level in the 2. Bundesliga for TuS Koblenz on 29 October 2008, when he started a game against TSV 1860 München.
