= Bernd Korzynietz =

German footballer

Personal information
- Date of birth: 8 September 1979 (age 47)
- Place of birth: Würzburg, West Germany
- Height: 1.74 m (5 ft 9 in)
- Position: Right-back

Youth career
- TSV Güntersleben
- 1995–1996: 1. FC Schweinfurt 05

Senior career*
Years	Team	Apps	(Gls)
1996–1999	1. FC Schweinfurt 05		
1999–2005	Borussia Mönchengladbach	150	(8)
2005–2008	Arminia Bielefeld	75	(0)
2008	→ VfL Wolfsburg (loan)	0	(0)
2009–2010	MSV Duisburg	30	(0)
Total		255	(8)

International career
1999–2001	Germany U21	16	(0)
2002–2004	Germany B	5	(2)
- * Club domestic league appearances and goals

Bernd Korzynietz (born 8 September 1979) is a German former professional footballer who played as a right-back.
