= Tim Petersen =

German footballer (born 1986)

Personal information
- Full name: Tim Kay Petersen
- Date of birth: 3 March 1986 (age 40)
- Place of birth: Hamburg, West Germany
- Height: 1.86 m (6 ft 1 in)
- Position: Defender

Youth career
- SV Lurup
- Niendorfer TSV
- –2002: FC St. Pauli
- 2002–2004: Hamburger SV

Senior career*
Years	Team	Apps	(Gls)
2004–2006	Hamburger SV II	9	(0)
2006–2007	Altonaer FC	22	(2)
2007–2008	FC St. Pauli	4	(0)
2008–2010	Carl Zeiss Jena	26	(0)
2009–2010	Carl Zeiss Jena II	3	(0)
2010–2014	VfB Oldenburg	41	(0)
2014–2015	SV Lurup	0	(0)
2015–2016	Eintracht Norderstedt	12	(1)
Total		117	(3)
- * Club domestic league appearances and goals

Tim Kay Petersen (born 3 March 1986) is a German former professional footballer who played as a defender.

== Career ==
Born in Hamburg, Petersen began his career at SV Lurup and Niendorfer TSV. In 2002, he played for the youth team of FC St. Pauli, joining in summer 2002 Hamburger SV until summer 2006. In the 2006–07 season, Petersen played for Altonaer FC von 1893 before he returned to FC St. Pauli. He was a member of the reserve team, playing in 27 matches. He made his debut in the 2. Bundesliga on 1 February 2008. On 15 May 2005, he was transferred to Thuringia club FC Carl Zeiss Jena, here signed a two-year contract. He joined VfB Oldenburg in June 2010.
