= FC Karbach =

German football club

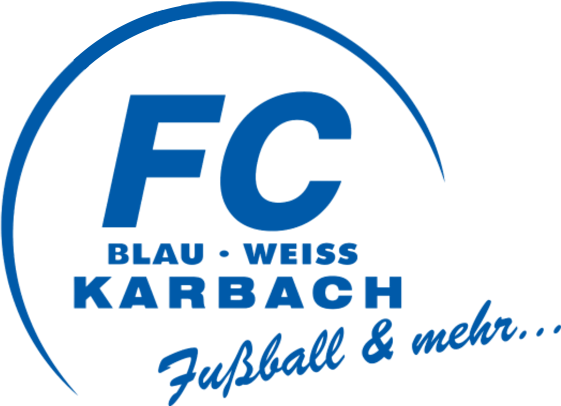
- Full name: Fußballclub Blau-Weiß Karbach e. V.
- Founded: 1920; 106 years ago
- Ground: Quintinsberg
- Chairman: Daniel Bernd
- Manager: Torsten Schmidt
- League: Oberliga Rheinland-Pfalz/Saar (V)
- 2025–26: Oberliga Rheinland-Pfalz/Saar, 3rd of 18
Home colours

FC Karbach is a German association football club from the town of Karbach, Rhineland-Palatinate. The club's greatest success has been promotion to the tier five Oberliga Rheinland-Pfalz/Saar in 2015.

== History ==
FC Karbach was formed in 1920 and initially played in the leagues of the Deutsche Jugendkraft, a catholic faith-based organisation. The club, from the start, played at the local Quintinsberg, still its home ground today, but then just a field covered in rocks and weeds. After the interruptions of the Second World War, during which the club did not field a team, it restarted after the war, playing in the tier five A-Klasse from 1951 until 1971. An era of lesser success followed with the team dropping down to the C-Klasse.

FC Karbach began to rise through the league system from 2005 onwards, achieving three consecutive league championships and promotions in the Kreisliga B, Kreisliga A and Bezirksliga. The latter took the club up to the tier six Rheinlandliga where it would play from 2008 to 2015. After finishing in the lower half of the table in its first two seasons there the club improved and finished runners up in 2013, followed by a league championship in 2015. The latter took the team up to the Oberliga Rheinland-Pfalz/Saar for 2015–16.

== Honours ==
The club's honours:

- Rheinlandliga
  - Champions: 2015
  - Runners-up: 2013
- Bezirksliga Mitte
  - Champions: 2008
- Kreisliga Hunsrück/Mosel A
  - Champions: 2007
- Kreisliga Hunsrück/Mosel B
  - Champions: 2006

== Recent seasons ==
The recent season-by-season performance of the club:

Season	Division	Tier	Position
2003–04	Kreisliga Hunsrück/Mosel B Süd	VIII	4th
2004–05	Kreisliga Hunsrück/Mosel B Süd	VIII	8th
2005–06	Kreisliga Hunsrück/Mosel B Süd	VIII	1st ↑
2006–07	Kreisliga Hunsrück/Mosel A	VII	1st ↑
2007–08	Bezirksliga Mitte	VI	1st ↑
2008–09	Rheinlandliga	VI	10th
2009–10	Rheinlandliga	VI	12th
2010–11	Rheinlandliga	VI	6th
2011–12	Rheinlandliga	VI	5th
2012–13	Rheinlandliga	VI	2nd
2013–14	Rheinlandliga	VI	5th
2014–15	Rheinlandliga	VI	1st ↑
2015–16	Oberliga Rheinland-Pfalz/Saar	V	3rd
2016–17	Oberliga Rheinland-Pfalz/Saar	V	

- With the introduction of the Regionalligas in 1994 and the 3. Liga in 2008 as the new third tier, below the 2. Bundesliga, all leagues below dropped one tier.

↑ Promoted	↓ Relegated
