= 2014–15 2. Bundesliga =

41st season of the second-tier football league in Germany

2. Bundesliga
- Season: 2014–15
- Champions: FC Ingolstadt
- Promoted: FC Ingolstadt; SV Darmstadt
- Relegated: Erzgebirge Aue; VfR Aalen
- Matches: 306
- Goals: 865 (2.83 per match)
- Top goalscorer: Rouwen Hennings (17 goals)
- Average attendance: 17,667

The 2014–15 2. Bundesliga was the 41st season of the 2. Bundesliga, Germany's second-level football competition.

== Teams ==
Location of teams in the 2014–15 2. Bundesliga

A total of 18 teams contest the league, including 12 sides from the 2013–14 season, two sides directly relegated from the 2013–14 Bundesliga season, and two sides directly promoted from the 2013–14 3. Liga season. The two final participants were determined in two-legged play-offs, in which the 16th placed Bundesliga side played the team who finished third in 2. Bundesliga and the 16th 2. Bundesliga side played the team who finished third in the 3. Liga.

2014–15 Teams

- 1. FC Nürnberg (relegated from 2013–14 Bundesliga)
- Eintracht Braunschweig (relegated from 2013–14 Bundesliga)
- 1. FC Kaiserslautern
- Karlsruher SC
- Fortuna Düsseldorf
- 1860 Munich
- FC St. Pauli
- VfR Aalen
- SV Sandhausen
- 1. FC Union Berlin
- FC Ingolstadt 04
- Erzgebirge Aue
- FSV Frankfurt
- Greuther Fürth
- VfL Bochum
- 1. FC Heidenheim (2013–14 3. Liga champion)
- RB Leipzig (2013–14 3. Liga runner-up)
- SV Darmstadt 98 (2013–14 2. Bundesliga Play-off Winner)

=== Stadiums and locations ===
Team	Location	Stadium	Stadium capacity
VfR Aalen	Aalen	Scholz-Arena	13,251
VfL Bochum	Bochum	rewirpowerSTADION	29,299
SV Darmstadt 98	Darmstadt	Stadion am Böllenfalltor	16,500
Eintracht Braunschweig	Braunschweig	Eintracht-Stadion	23,325
FC Erzgebirge Aue	Aue	Sparkassen-Erzgebirgsstadion	15,711
Fortuna Düsseldorf	Düsseldorf	Esprit Arena	54,600
FSV Frankfurt	Frankfurt am Main	Frankfurter Volksbank Stadion	12,542
SpVgg Greuther Fürth	Fürth	Trolli Arena	18,500
1. FC Heidenheim	Heidenheim	Voith-Arena	13,000
FC Ingolstadt 04	Ingolstadt	Audi Sportpark	15,445
1. FC Kaiserslautern	Kaiserslautern	Fritz-Walter-Stadion	49,780
Karlsruher SC	Karlsruhe	Wildparkstadion	29,699
RB Leipzig	Leipzig	Red Bull Arena	44,345
1860 Munich	Munich	Allianz Arena	71,000
1. FC Nürnberg	Nuremberg	Grundig-Stadion	50,000
SV Sandhausen	Sandhausen	Hardtwald	12,100
FC St. Pauli	Hamburg	Millerntor-Stadion	29,063^{Note 1}
1. FC Union Berlin	Berlin	Alte Försterei	21,704

Notes

1. The capacity was reduced from the end of October 2014 until the end of the season due to the demolition and redevelopment of the North stand.

=== Personnel and sponsorships ===
Team	Head coach	Team captain	Kitmaker	Shirt sponsor
VfR Aalen	(Germany) Stefan Ruthenbeck	(Argentina) Leandro Grech	Adidas	Prowin
VfL Bochum	(Netherlands) Gertjan Verbeek	(Germany) Andreas Luthe	Nike	Booster Energy Drink (H) / Netto (A)
SV Darmstadt 98	(Germany) Dirk Schuster	(Turkey) Aytac Sulu	Nike	Software AG
Eintracht Braunschweig	(Germany) Torsten Lieberknecht	(Germany) Dennis Kruppke	Nike	SEAT
Erzgebirge Aue	(Croatia) Tomislav Stipić	(Germany) René Klingbeil	Nike	Elektrowerkzeuge Vakuum Technik
Fortuna Düsseldorf	(Turkey) Taşkın Aksoy	(Germany) Andreas Lambertz	Puma	o.tel.o
FSV Frankfurt	(Germany) Tomas Oral	(Germany) Björn Schlicke	Saller	Sparhandy
SpVgg Greuther Fürth	(Germany) Mike Büskens	(Germany) Wolfgang Hesl	Hummel	Ergo Direkt Versicherungen
1. FC Heidenheim	(Germany) Frank Schmidt	(Germany) Marc Schnatterer	Nike	Hartmann Gruppe
FC Ingolstadt 04	(Austria) Ralph Hasenhüttl	(Germany) Stefan Leitl	Adidas	Audi
1. FC Kaiserslautern	(Germany) Kosta Runjaić	(Switzerland) Albert Bunjaku	Uhlsport	Paysafecard
Karlsruher SC	(Germany) Markus Kauczinski	(Germany) Dirk Orlishausen	Hummel	Klaiber Markisen
RB Leipzig	(Germany) Achim Beierlorzer	(Germany) Daniel Frahn	Nike	Red Bull
1860 Munich	(Germany) Torsten Fröhling	(Germany) Christopher Schindler	Uhlsport	Think Blue
1. FC Nürnberg	(Switzerland) René Weiler	(Germany) Raphael Schäfer	Adidas	Wolf Möbel
SV Sandhausen	(Germany) Alois Schwartz	(Germany) Frank Löning	Puma	Verivox
FC St. Pauli	(Germany) Ewald Lienen	(Germany) Sören Gonther	Hummel	Congstar
1. FC Union Berlin	(Germany) Norbert Düwel	(Croatia) Damir Kreilach	Uhlsport	kfzteile24

=== Managerial changes ===
Team	Outgoing manager	Manner of departure	Date of vacancy	Position in table	Incoming manager	Date of appointment
1. FC Union Berlin	(Germany) Uwe Neuhaus	Mutual consent	11 May 2014	Pre-season	(Germany) Norbert Düwel	13 May 2014
1860 Munich	(Germany) Markus von Ahlen	End of tenure as caretaker	4 June 2014	Pre-season	(Netherlands) Ricardo Moniz	4 June 2014
1. FC Nürnberg	(Germany) Roger Prinzen	End of tenure as caretaker	5 June 2014	Pre-season	(France) Valérien Ismaël	5 June 2014
Fortuna Düsseldorf	(Germany) Lorenz-Günther Köstner	Mutual consent	12 June 2014	Pre-season	(Germany) Oliver Reck	13 June 2014
Erzgebirge Aue	(Germany) Falko Götz	Sacked	2 September 2014	18th	(Croatia) Tomislav Stipić	9 September 2014
FC St. Pauli	(Germany) Roland Vrabec	Sacked	3 September 2014	14th	(Germany) Thomas Meggle	3 September 2014
1860 Munich	(Netherlands) Ricardo Moniz	Sacked	24 September 2014	13th	(Germany) Markus von Ahlen	24 September 2014
1. FC Nürnberg	(France) Valérien Ismaël	Sacked	11 November 2014	14th	(Switzerland) René Weiler	12 November 2014
VfL Bochum	(Germany) Peter Neururer	Sacked	9 December 2014	10th	(Germany) Frank Heinemann	9 December 2014
FC St. Pauli	(Germany) Thomas Meggle	Sacked	16 December 2014	18th	(Germany) Ewald Lienen	16 December 2014
VfL Bochum	(Germany) Frank Heinemann	End of tenure as caretaker	31 December 2014	11th	(Netherlands) Gertjan Verbeek	1 January 2015
RB Leipzig	(Germany) Alexander Zorniger	Mutual consent	11 February 2015	7th	(Germany) Achim Beierlorzer	11 February 2015
1860 Munich	(Germany) Markus von Ahlen	Sacked	17 February 2015	16th	(Germany) Torsten Fröhling	17 February 2015
SpVgg Greuther Fürth	(Germany) Frank Kramer	Sacked	23 February 2015	13th	(Germany) Mike Büskens	23 February 2015
Fortuna Düsseldorf	(Germany) Oliver Reck	Sacked	23 February 2015	6th	(Germany) Taşkın Aksoy	13 April 2015
FSV Frankfurt	(Germany) Benno Möhlmann	Sacked	18 May 2015	16th	(Germany) Tomas Oral	18 May 2015

== League table ==
Pos	Team	Pld	W	D	L	GF	GA	GD	Pts	Promotion, qualification or relegation
1	FC Ingolstadt (C, P)	34	17	13	4	53	32	+21	64	Promotion to Bundesliga
2	Darmstadt 98 (P)	34	15	14	5	44	26	+18	59	Promotion to Bundesliga
3	Karlsruher SC	34	15	13	6	46	26	+20	58	Qualification for promotion play-offs
4	1. FC Kaiserslautern	34	14	14	6	45	31	+14	56	
5	RB Leipzig	34	13	11	10	39	31	+8	50	
6	Eintracht Braunschweig	34	15	5	14	44	41	+3	50	
7	Union Berlin	34	12	11	11	46	51	−5	47	
8	1. FC Heidenheim	34	12	10	12	49	44	+5	46	
9	1. FC Nürnberg	34	13	6	15	42	47	−5	45	
10	Fortuna Düsseldorf	34	11	11	12	48	52	−4	44	
11	VfL Bochum	34	9	15	10	53	55	−2	42	
12	SV Sandhausen	34	10	12	12	32	37	−5	39 (Note: SV Sandhausen were deducted three points for license violation.)	
13	FSV Frankfurt	34	10	9	15	41	53	−12	39	
14	Greuther Fürth	34	8	13	13	34	42	−8	37	
15	FC St. Pauli	34	10	7	17	40	51	−11	37	
16	1860 Munich (O)	34	9	9	16	41	51	−10	36	Qualification for relegation play-offs
17	Erzgebirge Aue (R)	34	9	9	16	32	47	−15	36	Relegation to 3. Liga
18	VfR Aalen (R)	34	7	12	15	34	46	−12	31 (Note: VfR Aalen were deducted two points for license violation.)	Relegation to 3. Liga

Source: DFB
Rules for classification: 1) Points; 2) Goal difference; 3) Goals scored
(C) Champions; (O) Play-off winners; (P) Promoted; (R) Relegated

== Results ==
Home \ Away	AAL	AUE	UNB	BOC	EBS	D98	F95	FSV	SGF	FCH	FCI	FCK	KSC	RBL	M60	FCN	SVS	STP
VfR Aalen	—	3–0	1–2	2–4	2–1	0–0	2–0	0–1	1–1	2–4	1–1	2–2	2–2	0–0	2–0	1–2	0–1	2–0
Erzgebirge Aue	1–0	—	1–2	1–5	1–2	0–1	0–3	1–0	0–0	1–1	0–3	0–0	3–1	2–0	4–1	0–1	0–1	3–0
Union Berlin	1–1	1–2	—	2–1	2–0	1–1	1–1	2–1	0–1	3–1	2–2	0–0	2–0	2–1	1–4	0–4	3–1	1–0
VfL Bochum	4–0	1–1	1–1	—	3–2	1–1	1–1	3–3	1–1	4–1	3–1	0–2	1–1	1–2	0–3	1–1	0–0	3–3
Eintracht Braunschweig	2–1	4–2	1–1	1–2	—	2–0	2–1	2–0	2–2	3–0	0–0	0–2	0–2	1–1	2–0	1–0	2–1	0–2
Darmstadt 98	2–0	2–0	5–0	2–0	1–0	—	1–4	4–0	0–0	1–1	2–2	3–2	0–0	1–0	1–1	3–0	1–0	1–0
Fortuna Düsseldorf	0–2	2–3	1–0	2–2	2–2	2–0	—	2–3	3–3	3–2	0–0	1–1	0–2	2–2	1–1	1–3	1–3	1–0
FSV Frankfurt	1–1	1–1	1–3	1–5	0–3	1–1	0–2	—	1–1	2–0	0–1	2–0	2–3	0–0	0–1	2–1	1–1	3–3
Greuther Fürth	1–1	2–0	2–2	0–0	1–2	1–0	3–0	2–5	—	0–0	0–1	2–1	0–3	0–1	0–3	5–1	0–0	3–0
1. FC Heidenheim	0–1	2–2	3–1	5–0	0–1	1–1	1–2	2–1	3–0	—	0–1	1–1	0–1	1–0	2–2	3–0	3–0	2–1
FC Ingolstadt	4–1	1–1	3–3	3–0	1–0	2–2	3–2	2–0	2–0	1–0	—	2–0	1–3	2–1	1–1	1–1	1–3	2–1
1. FC Kaiserslautern	1–0	3–0	1–0	2–2	2–1	0–0	1–1	1–0	2–1	4–0	1–1	—	2–0	1–1	3–2	2–1	1–0	0–2
Karlsruher SC	0–0	1–0	0–0	0–0	1–0	0–1	1–1	4–1	2–1	1–1	0–1	0–0	—	0–0	2–0	3–0	1–1	3–0
RB Leipzig	0–0	1–0	3–2	2–0	3–1	2–1	3–1	0–1	2–0	1–1	0–1	0–0	3–1	—	1–1	2–1	0–4	4–1
1860 Munich	1–1	0–1	0–3	2–1	1–2	1–1	0–1	0–2	2–0	1–2	1–1	1–1	2–3	0–3	—	2–1	2–3	2–1
1. FC Nürnberg	2–1	1–0	3–1	1–2	3–1	1–1	0–2	0–1	0–0	0–1	2–1	3–2	1–1	1–0	2–1	—	2–0	2–2
SV Sandhausen	2–0	1–1	1–1	0–0	0–1	1–2	0–2	0–3	1–0	2–2	0–3	1–1	0–0	0–0	1–0	2–1	—	0–0
FC St. Pauli	3–1	0–0	3–0	5–1	1–0	0–1	4–0	1–1	0–1	0–3	1–1	1–3	0–4	1–0	1–2	1–0	2–1	—

Source: DFB
Legend: Blue = home team win; Yellow = draw; Red = away team win.

== Promotion play-offs ==
The team which finishes 16th, will face the third-placed 2014–15 2. Bundesliga side for a two-legged play-off. The winner on aggregate score after both matches earns entry into the 2015–16 Bundesliga. Hamburger SV prevailed for the second year in a row, avoiding their possible first relegation.

=== First leg ===
28 May 2015
20:30 CEST

Hamburger SV	1–1	Karlsruher SC
Iličević 73'	Report	Hennings 4'

Volksparkstadion, Hamburg
Attendance: 56,615
Referee: Deniz Aytekin

Hamburger SV	Karlsruher SC

GK	15	(Germany) René Adler
RB	4	(Germany) Heiko Westermann	(yellow card) 26'	(substituted off) 56'
CB	5	(Switzerland) Johan Djourou (c)
CB	32	(Serbia) Slobodan Rajković
LB	22	(Germany) Matthias Ostrzolek
CM	40	(Serbia) Gojko Kačar	(yellow card) 83'
CM	20	(Chile) Marcelo Díaz
RW	8	(Croatia) Ivica Olić		(substituted off) 89'
AM	18	(Germany) Lewis Holtby	(yellow card) 59'	(substituted off) 69'
LW	11	(Croatia) Ivo Iličević
CF	10	(Germany) Pierre-Michel Lasogga
Substitutes:
GK	30	(Germany) Alexander Brunst
DF	2	(Germany) Dennis Diekmeier	(yellow card) 83'	(substituted on) 56'
DF	3	(Brazil) Cléber
MF	17	(Hungary) Zoltán Stieber		(substituted on) 69'
MF	23	(Netherlands) Rafael van der Vaart
MF	27	(Germany) Nicolai Müller
FW	9	(Germany) Maximilian Beister		(substituted on) 89'
Manager:
(Germany) Bruno Labbadia

GK	1	(Germany) Dirk Orlishausen (c)
RB	22	(Germany) Enrico Valentini	(yellow card) 13'
CB	3	(Jamaica) Daniel Gordon
CB	14	(Germany) Manuel Gulde
LB	31	(Germany) Philipp Max
CM	13	(Germany) Dominic Peitz	(yellow card) 78'
CM	23	(Germany) Jonas Meffert
RW	18	(Spain) Manuel Torres Jiménez
AM	8	(Germany) Reinhold Yabo		(substituted off) 76'
LW	11	(Azerbaijan) Dimitrij Nazarov
CF	17	(Germany) Rouwen Hennings		(substituted off) 90+3'
Substitutes:
GK	24	(Germany) René Vollath
DF	4	(Germany) Martin Stoll
DF	5	(Germany) Dennis Kempe
DF	20	(Austria) Ylli Sallahi
MF	15	(Germany) Boubacar Barry
MF	21	(France) Gaëtan Krebs		(substituted on) 76'
FW	19	(Bulgaria) Iliyan Mitsanski		(substituted on) 90+3'
Manager:
(Germany) Markus Kauczinski

Assistant referees:
Benjamin Brand
Markus Hacker
Fourth official:
Michael Weiner

Match rules

- 90 minutes.
- Seven named substitutes.
- Maximum of three substitutions.

=== Second leg ===
1 June 2015
19:00 CEST

Karlsruher SC	1–2 (a.e.t.)	Hamburger SV
Yabo 78'	Report	Díaz 90+1'; Müller 115'

Wildparkstadion, Karlsruhe
Attendance: 27,986
Referee: Manuel Gräfe

Karlsruher SC	Hamburger SV

GK	1	(Germany) Dirk Orlishausen (c)
RB	22	(Germany) Enrico Valentini
CB	3	(Jamaica) Daniel Gordon		(yellow card) 118'
CB	14	(Germany) Manuel Gulde	(yellow card) 90+2'
LB	31	(Germany) Philipp Max		(substituted off) 86'
CM	21	(France) Gaëtan Krebs	(yellow card) 87'	(substituted off) 89'
CM	23	(Germany) Jonas Meffert	(yellow card) 90'
RW	18	(Spain) Manuel Torres Jiménez
AM	9	(Japan) Hiroki Yamada		(substituted off) 72'
LW	11	(Azerbaijan) Dimitrij Nazarov	(yellow card) 120+1'
CF	17	(Germany) Rouwen Hennings
Substitutes:
GK	24	(Germany) René Vollath
DF	4	(Germany) Martin Stoll		(substituted on) 89'
DF	5	(Germany) Dennis Kempe		(substituted on) 86'
DF	20	(Austria) Ylli Sallahi
MF	8	(Germany) Reinhold Yabo		(substituted on) 72'
MF	15	(Germany) Boubacar Barry
FW	19	(Bulgaria) Iliyan Mitsanski
Manager:
(Germany) Markus Kauczinski

GK	15	(Germany) René Adler
RB	2	(Germany) Dennis Diekmeier
CB	5	(Switzerland) Johan Djourou
CB	32	(Serbia) Slobodan Rajković	(yellow card) 63'
LB	22	(Germany) Matthias Ostrzolek
CM	20	(Chile) Marcelo Díaz	(yellow card) 55'
CM	23	(Netherlands) Rafael van der Vaart (c)	(yellow card) 48'
RW	8	(Croatia) Ivica Olić		(substituted off) 77'
AM	18	(Germany) Lewis Holtby		(substituted off) 66'
LW	11	(Croatia) Ivo Iličević		(substituted off) 86'
CF	10	(Germany) Pierre-Michel Lasogga
Substitutes:
GK	30	(Germany) Alexander Brunst
DF	3	(Brazil) Cléber	(yellow card) 101'	(substituted on) 86'
DF	31	(Mozambique) Ronny Marcos
MF	17	(Hungary) Zoltán Stieber		(substituted on) 66'
MF	19	(Czech Republic) Petr Jiráček	(yellow card) 115'
MF	27	(Germany) Nicolai Müller		(substituted on) 77'
FW	9	(Germany) Maximilian Beister	(yellow card) 90+2'
Manager:
(Germany) Bruno Labbadia

Assistant referees:
Guido Kleve
René Rohde
Fourth official:
Marco Fritz

Match rules

- 90 minutes of regular time.
- 30 minutes of extra time if tied on aggregate.
- Penalty shoot-out if no further goals are scored.
- Seven named substitutes.
- Maximum of three substitutions.

Hamburger SV won 3–2 on aggregate.

== Relegation play-offs ==
The team which finished 16th faced the third-placed 2014–15 3. Liga side for a two-legged play-off. The winner on aggregate score after both matches earned entry into the 2015–16 2. Bundesliga.

=== First leg ===
29 May 2015
20:30 CEST

Holstein Kiel	0–0	1860 Munich
	Report

Holstein-Stadion, Kiel
Attendance: 9,812
Referee: Florian Meyer (Burgdorf)

Kiel	1860 Munich

GK	18	(Germany) Kenneth Kronholm
RB	19	(Germany) Patrick Herrmann
CB	13	(Germany) Marlon Krause
CB	29	(Germany) Hauke Wahl
LB	7	(Republic of Ireland) Patrick Kohlmann
CM	14	(Germany) Maik Kegel
CM	16	(Denmark) Mikkel Vendelbo	(yellow card) 74'
RW	21	(Germany) Tim Siedschlag		(substituted off) 78'
LW	11	(Germany) Rafael Kazior (c)
SS	9	(Germany) Manuel Schäffler		(substituted off) 86'
CF	20	(United States) Marc Heider		(substituted off) 69'
Substitutes:
GK	25	(Germany) Niklas Jakusch
DF	27	(Germany) Marcel Gebers
MF	24	(Poland) Jarosław Lindner		(substituted on) 78'
MF	26	(Germany) Patrick Breitkreuz		(substituted on) 69'
MF	28	(Germany) René Guder
MF	31	(Germany) Finn Wirlmann
FW	22	(Germany) Fiete Sykora		(substituted on) 86'
Manager:
Karsten Neitzel

GK	30	(Germany) Vitus Eicher
RB	25	(Uruguay) Gary Kagelmacher
CB	4	(Germany) Kai Bülow
CB	26	(Germany) Christopher Schindler (c)
LB	32	(Germany) Maximilian Wittek	(yellow card) 89'
CM	6	(Germany) Dominik Stahl	(yellow card) 45+1'
CM	11	(Germany) Daniel Adlung
RW	14	(Hungary) Krisztián Simon		(substituted off) 54'
LW	17	(Germany) Jannik Bandowski		(substituted off) 80'
SS	20	(Albania) Valdet Rama
CF	19	(Austria) Rubin Okotie	(yellow card) 54'	(substituted off) 55'
Substitutes:
GK	24	(Germany) Stefan Ortega
DF	39	(Slovakia) Vladimír Kováč
MF	7	(South Africa) Daylon Claasen
MF	28	(Germany) Julian Weigl
MF	33	(Germany) Korbinian Vollmann		(substituted on) 54'
FW	16	(Germany) Stephan Hain		(substituted on) 80'
FW	27	(Germany) Marius Wolf		(substituted on) 55'
Manager:
Torsten Fröhling

Assistant referees:
Frank Willenborg
Holger Henschel
Fourth official:
Harm Osmers

=== Second leg ===
2 June 2015
20:30 CEST

1860 Munich	2–1	Holstein Kiel
Adlung 78'; Bülow 90+1'	Report	Kazior 16'

Allianz Arena, Munich
Attendance: 57,000
Referee: Knut Kircher (Rottenburg)

1860 Munich	Kiel

GK	30	(Germany) Vitus Eicher
RB	25	(Uruguay) Gary Kagelmacher
CB	4	(Germany) Kai Bülow
CB	26	(Germany) Christopher Schindler (c)
LB	32	(Germany) Maximilian Wittek
CM	6	(Germany) Dominik Stahl		(substituted off) 13'
CM	11	(Germany) Daniel Adlung
RW	20	(Albania) Valdet Rama
LW	17	(Germany) Jannik Bandowski		(substituted off) 56'
CF	19	(Austria) Rubin Okotie		(substituted off) 70'
CF	16	(Germany) Stephan Hain
Substitutes:
GK	24	(Germany) Stefan Ortega	(yellow card) 90+4'
DF	18	(Switzerland) Martin Angha
DF	39	(Slovakia) Vladimír Kováč
MF	28	(Germany) Julian Weigl	(yellow card) 46'	(substituted on) 13'
MF	33	(Germany) Korbinian Vollmann		(substituted on) 70'
FW	14	(Hungary) Krisztián Simon
FW	27	(Germany) Marius Wolf		(substituted on) 56'
Manager:
Torsten Fröhling

GK	18	(Germany) Kenneth Kronholm
RB	19	(Germany) Patrick Herrmann
CB	13	(Germany) Marlon Krause
CB	29	(Germany) Hauke Wahl
LB	7	(Republic of Ireland) Patrick Kohlmann
DM	16	(Denmark) Mikkel Vendelbo
RW	21	(Germany) Tim Siedschlag
AM	14	(Germany) Maik Kegel		(substituted off) 89'
LW	24	(Poland) Jarosław Lindner		(substituted off) 51'
SS	11	(Poland) Rafael Kazior (c)
CF	9	(Germany) Manuel Schäffler	(yellow card) 43'	(substituted off) 60'
Substitutes:
GK	25	(Germany) Niklas Jakusch
DF	27	(Germany) Marcel Gebers		(substituted on) 89'
MF	26	(Germany) Patrick Breitkreuz	(yellow card) 69'	(substituted on) 60'
MF	28	(Germany) René Guder
MF	31	(Germany) Finn Wirlmann
FW	20	(United States) Marc Heider		(substituted on) 51'
FW	22	(Germany) Fiete Sykora
Manager:
Karsten Neitzel

Assistant referees:
Robert Kempter
Martin Petersen
Fourth official:
Sascha Stegemann

1860 Munich won 2–1 on aggregate.

== Season statistics ==
=== Top scorers ===
As of 24 May 2015

Rank	Player	Club	Goals
1	(Germany) Rouwen Hennings	Karlsruher SC	17
2	(Germany) Simon Terodde	VfL Bochum	16
3	(Germany) Florian Niederlechner	1. FC Heidenheim	15
4	(Germany) Sebastian Polter	1. FC Union Berlin	14
5	(Netherlands) Charlison Benschop	Fortuna Düsseldorf	13
5	(Austria) Rubin Okotie	1860 Munich	13
7	(Albania) Edmond Kapllani	FSV Frankfurt	11
7	(Finland) Joel Pohjanpalo	Fortuna Düsseldorf	11
7	(Denmark) Yussuf Poulsen	RB Leipzig	11
7	(Germany) Marc Schnatterer	1. FC Heidenheim	11

== Attendances ==
No.	Team	Attendance	Change	Highest
1	1. FC Kaiserslautern	33,013	11.8%	49,780
2	1. FC Nürnberg	30,743	-23.9%	47,501
3	Fortuna 95	29,945	-11.9%	41,667
4	RB Leipzig	25,025	49.5%	38,660
5	FC St. Pauli	24,640	-13.2%	29,063
6	TSV 1860	21,918	13.5%	68,500
7	BTSV Eintracht	21,610	-5.1%	23,100
8	1. FC Union Berlin	19,147	-3.2%	21,717
9	Karlsruher SC	17,381	7.7%	27,771
10	VfL Bochum	16,850	4.2%	25,094
11	Darmstadt 98	14,135	100.0%	16,150
12	1. FC Heidenheim	12,582	39.3%	15,000
13	Greuther Fürth	11,793	-1.1%	17,500
14	FC Ingolstadt 04	9,892	45.8%	15,000
15	Erzgebirge Aue	9,112	-3.1%	15,300
16	VfR Aalen	7,575	2.4%	14,500
17	FSV Frankfurt	6,631	5.5%	12,542
18	SV Sandhausen	5,933	6.5%	12,136
