= 2015–16 Holstein Kiel season =

Holstein Kiel
2015–16 season
- Chairman: Roland Reime
- Manager: Karsten Neitzel
- Stadium: Holstein-Stadion
- 3. Liga: 14th
- DFB-Pokal: Round 1
- Schleswig-Holstein Cup: Semi-Finals
Home colours	Away colours	Third colours
- All statistics correct as of 18 June 2015.

The 2015–16 Holstein Kiel season was the 116th season in the football club's history and 3rd consecutive in the third tier of German football, the 3. Liga, having been promoted from the Regionalliga Nord in 2013. In addition to the 3. Liga, Holstein Kiel also participated in the DFB-Pokal, and the Schleswig-Holstein Cup, part of the Verbandspokal. This was the 105th season for the club in the Holstein-Stadion, located in Kiel, Germany. The stadium had a capacity of 11,386 seats.

== Background ==
In the club's previous season in the 3. Liga, they finished in 3rd place, qualifying to the promotion playoffs where they faced TSV 1860 München. They lost 1–2 on aggregate after 1860 München scored two late goals, with one in stoppage time. After losing on aggregate, they remained in the 3. Liga. In the Schleswig-Holstein Cup, they made it to the final, which was never played. This was because Holstein Kiel already qualified for the DFB-Pokal through league position, meaning their opponents VfB Lübeck would qualify no matter what. In the previous season's edition of the DFB-Pokal, they went out in Round 1 after losing to TSV 1860 München 1–2.

== Squad ==
Note: Flags indicate national team as defined under FIFA eligibility rules; some limited exceptions apply. Players may hold more than one non-FIFA nationality.

No.	Pos.	Nation	Player
1	GK	GER	Maximilian Riedmüller
3	DF	GER	Patrick Auracher
4	DF	GER	Manuel Hartmann
7	DF	IRL	Patrick Kohlmann
9	FW	GER	Manuel Schäffler
10	FW	GER	Saliou Sané (on loan from SC Paderborn 07)
11	MF	POL	Rafael Kazior
12	GK	GER	Chris Kröhnert
13	MF	GER	Marlon Krause
14	MF	GER	Maik Kegel
15	FW	GER	Fabian Arndt
16	MF	DEN	Mikkel Vendelbo
17	DF	GER	Fabian Wetter

No.	Pos.	Nation	Player
18	GK	GER	Kenneth Kronholm
19	DF	GER	Patrick Herrmann
20	FW	USA	Marc Heider
21	MF	GER	Tim Siedschlag
22	FW	GER	Fiete Sykora
24	MF	POL	Jarosław Lindner
25	GK	GER	Niklas Jakusch
26	MF	GER	Patrick Breitkreuz
27	DF	GER	Marcel Gebers
29	DF	GER	Hauke Wahl
31	MF	GER	Finn Wirlmann
32	DF	GER	Marcel Kohn
TBA	MF	AFG	Milad Salem

== Competitions ==
=== 3. Liga ===
==== League table ====
Pos	Team	Pld	W	D	L	GF	GA	GD	Pts
12	Mainz 05 II (Note: Reserve teams are ineligible for promotion or DFB-Pokal qualification.)	38	12	12	14	48	47	+1	48
13	Hallescher FC	38	13	9	16	48	48	0	48
14	Holstein Kiel	38	12	12	14	44	47	−3	48
15	VfR Aalen	38	10	14	14	35	40	−5	44
16	Wehen Wiesbaden	38	9	16	13	35	48	−13	43

Source: DFB
Rules for classification: 1) Points; 2) Goal difference; 3) Goals scored

=== DFB-Pokal ===
Win Draw Loss

8 August 2015 Round 1	Holstein Kiel	1–2	VfB Stuttgart	Kiel
20:30 CEST (UTC+02:00)	Czichos 37'; Herrmann (yellow card) 43'	Report	Didavi 41'; Gruezo (yellow card) 58'; Ginczek 60'; Rupp (yellow card) 90+1'	Stadium: Holstein-Stadion; Attendance: 9,916; Referee: Guido Winkmann
