= 2015–16 3. Liga =

8th season of the 3. Liga

3. Liga
- Season: 2015–16
- Champions: Dynamo Dresden
- Promoted: Dynamo Dresden; Erzgebirge Aue; Würzburger Kickers
- Relegated: Stuttgarter Kickers; Energie Cottbus; VfB Stuttgart II
- Matches: 380
- Goals: 905 (2.38 per match)
- Top goalscorer: Justin Eilers (23 goals)

The 2015–16 3. Liga was the eighth season of the 3. Liga.

== Teams ==
A total of 20 teams contested the league, including 14 sides from the 2014–15 3. Liga. Arminia Bielefeld and MSV Duisburg were directly promoted to the 2015–16 2. Bundesliga at the end of the 2014–15 season. Bielefeld made an immediate return to the 2. Bundesliga after being relegated in 2013–14. Duisburg returned to the 2. Bundesliga after two seasons in the third tier. The two promoted teams were replaced by FC Erzgebirge Aue and VfR Aalen, who finished in the bottom two places of the 2014–15 2. Bundesliga table.

At the other end of the table, Borussia Dortmund II, SpVgg Unterhaching and SSV Jahn Regensburg were relegated to the 2015–16 Regionalliga. The three relegated teams were replaced by the three winners of the 2014–15 Regionalliga promotion playoffs. SV Werder Bremen II from the Regionalliga Nord returned to the national level after three seasons in the fourth tier, while 1. FC Magdeburg from the Regionalliga Nordost and Würzburger Kickers from the Regionalliga Bayern are playing their debut seasons in the 3. Liga.

A further place in the league was available via a two-legged play-off between third-placed 2014–15 3. Liga team Holstein Kiel and 16th-placed 2014–15 2. Bundesliga side TSV 1860 München. The tie ended 2–1 on aggregate and saw Kiel remaining in the 3. Liga.

=== Stadiums and locations ===
Locations of the 2015–16 3. Liga teams

Team	Location	Stadium	Capacity
VfR Aalen	Aalen	Scholz-Arena	13,251
SG Sonnenhof Großaspach	Aspach	Mechatronik Arena	10,000
Chemnitzer FC	Chemnitz	Stadion an der Gellertstraße	18,712
Dynamo Dresden	Dresden	Glücksgas-Stadion	32,066
Energie Cottbus	Cottbus	Stadion der Freundschaft	22,528
FC Erzgebirge Aue	Aue	Sparkassen-Erzgebirgsstadion	15,711
Hallescher FC	Halle	Erdgas Sportpark	15,057
Hansa Rostock	Rostock	DKB-Arena	29,000
Holstein Kiel	Kiel	Holstein-Stadion	11,386
SC Fortuna Köln	Cologne	Südstadion	14,800
1. FSV Mainz 05 II	Mainz	Stadion am Bruchweg	20,300
1. FC Magdeburg	Magdeburg	MDCC-Arena	27,500
VfL Osnabrück	Osnabrück	Osnatel-Arena	16,667
Preußen Münster	Münster	Preußenstadion	15,050
Rot-Weiß Erfurt	Erfurt	Steigerwaldstadion	17,500
VfB Stuttgart II	Stuttgart	Gazi-Stadion auf der Waldau	10,100
Stuttgarter Kickers	Stuttgart	Gazi-Stadion auf der Waldau	10,100
SV Wehen Wiesbaden	Wiesbaden	BRITA-Arena	12,250
SV Werder Bremen II	Bremen	Weserstadion Platz 11	5,500
Würzburger Kickers	Würzburg	Flyeralarm Arena	14,500

=== Personnel and kits ===
Team	Manager	Captain	Kit manufacturer	Shirt sponsor
VfR Aalen	(Germany) Peter Vollmann	(Germany) Markus Schwabl	Saller	Prowin
Chemnitzer FC	(Germany) Sven Köhler	(Germany) Anton Fink	adidas	Ahorn Hotels
Dynamo Dresden	(Germany) Uwe Neuhaus	(Germany) Michael Hefele	erima	Feldschlösschen
Energie Cottbus	(Germany) Claus-Dieter Wollitz	(Germany) Uwe Möhrle	Saller	Karton.eu
Erzgebirge Aue	(Bulgaria) Pavel Dochev	(Germany) Martin Männel	Nike	Kumpelverein
1. FSV Mainz 05 II	(Germany) Sandro Schwarz	(Germany) Damian Roßbach	Lotto	Kömmerling
Hallescher FC	(Germany) Rico Schmitt	(Germany) Tim Kruse	Puma	Halplus
Hansa Rostock	(Germany) Christian Brand	(Germany) Tobias Jänicke	Nike	kurzurlaub.de
Holstein Kiel	(Germany) Karsten Neitzel	(Germany) Marlon Krause	adidas	Famila
VfL Osnabrück	(United States) Joe Enochs	(Germany) Tobias Willers	adidas	Sparkasse
1. FC Magdeburg	(Germany) Jens Härtel	(Poland) Marius Sowislo	Uhlsport	FAM
Preußen Münster	(Germany) Horst Steffen	(Portugal) Amaury Bischoff	Nike	Tuja Zeitarbeit
Rot-Weiß Erfurt	(Germany) Stefan Krämer	(Poland) Sebastian Tyrała	Jako	Thüringer Energie AG
SC Fortuna Köln	(Germany) Uwe Koschinat	(Germany) Florian Hörnig	Jako	HIT Handelsgruppe
SG Sonnenhof Großaspach	(Germany) Rüdiger Rehm	(Germany) Kai Gehring	Hummel	Urbacher Mineralquellen
VfB Stuttgart II	(Germany) Walter Thomae	(Germany) Tobias Rathgeb	Puma	Mercedes-Benz Bank
Stuttgarter Kickers	(Croatia) Tomislav Stipić	(Germany) Fabian Baumgärtel	Uhlsport	MHP
SV Wehen Wiesbaden	(Germany) Torsten Fröhling	(Germany) Kevin Pezzoni	Nike	Brita
SV Werder Bremen II	(Germany) Alexander Nouri	(Poland) Rafael Kazior	Nike	Wiesenhof
Würzburger Kickers	(Germany) Bernd Hollerbach	(Iran) Amir Shapourzadeh	Nike	Sansibar

=== Managerial changes ===
Team	Outgoing manager	Manner of departure	Date of vacancy	Position in table	Incoming manager	Date of appointment
Dynamo Dresden	(Slovakia) Peter Németh	Left	10 April 2015	Pre-season	(Germany) Uwe Neuhaus	10 April 2015
SV Wehen Wiesbaden	(Germany) Christian Hock	End of caretaker stint	12 May 2015	Pre-season	(Germany) Sven Demandt	12 May 2015
FC Erzgebirge Aue	(Croatia) Tomislav Stipić	Mutual termination	27 May 2015	Pre-season	(Bulgaria) Pavel Dochev	4 June 2015
VfR Aalen	(Germany) Stefan Ruthenbeck	Left	12 June 2015	Pre-season	(Germany) Peter Vollmann	12 June 2015
VfL Osnabrück	(Germany) Maik Walpurgis	Sacked	24 August 2015	19th	(United States) Joe Enochs	24 August 2015
Hallescher FC	(Germany) Sven Köhler	Sacked	30 August 2015	19th	(Germany) Stefan Böger	8 September 2015
Energie Cottbus	(Germany) Stefan Krämer	Sacked	19 September 2015	17th	(Hungary) Vasile Miriuță	23 September 2015
Stuttgarter Kickers	(Germany) Horst Steffen	Sacked	4 November 2015	14th	(Croatia) Tomislav Stipić	4 November 2015
VfB Stuttgart II	(Germany) Jürgen Kramny	Promoted to first team	24 November 2015	18th	(Germany) Walter Thomae	21 December 2015
Hansa Rostock	(Germany) Karsten Baumann	Sacked	5 December 2015	18th	(Germany) Christian Brand	7 December 2015
Rot-Weiß Erfurt	(Germany) Christian Preußer	Sacked	15 December 2015	16th	(Germany) Stefan Krämer	30 December 2015
Preußen Münster	(Germany) Ralf Loose	Sacked	19 December 2015	5th	(Germany) Horst Steffen	25 December 2015
Chemnitzer FC	(Germany) Karsten Heine	Sacked	2 March 2016	17th	(Germany) Sven Köhler	2 March 2016
Wehen Wiesbaden	(Germany) Sven Demandt	Sacked	7 March 2016	16th	(Germany) Torsten Fröhling	14 March 2016
Energie Cottbus	(Hungary) Vasile Miriuță	Sacked	12 April 2016	18th	(Germany) Claus-Dieter Wollitz	12 April 2016
Hallescher FC	(Germany) Stefan Böger	Sacked	13 April 2016	15th	(Germany) Rico Schmitt	13 April 2016

== League table ==
Pos	Team	Pld	W	D	L	GF	GA	GD	Pts	Promotion, qualification or relegation
1	Dynamo Dresden (C, P)	38	21	15	2	75	35	+40	78	Promotion to 2. Bundesliga and qualification for DFB-Pokal
2	Erzgebirge Aue (P)	38	19	13	6	42	21	+21	70	Promotion to 2. Bundesliga and qualification for DFB-Pokal
3	Würzburger Kickers (O, P)	38	16	16	6	43	25	+18	64	Qualification for promotion play-offs and DFB-Pokal
4	1. FC Magdeburg	38	14	14	10	49	37	+12	56	Qualification for DFB-Pokal
5	VfL Osnabrück	38	14	14	10	46	41	+5	56	
6	Chemnitzer FC	38	15	10	13	52	46	+6	55	
7	Sonnenhof Großaspach	38	14	12	12	58	47	+11	54	
8	Rot-Weiß Erfurt	38	14	8	16	47	50	−3	50	
9	Preußen Münster	38	12	13	13	43	41	+2	49	
10	Hansa Rostock	38	12	13	13	42	48	−6	49	
11	Fortuna Köln	38	14	7	17	56	69	−13	49	
12	Mainz 05 II (Note: Reserve teams are ineligible for promotion or DFB-Pokal qualification.)	38	12	12	14	48	47	+1	48	
13	Hallescher FC	38	13	9	16	48	48	0	48	
14	Holstein Kiel	38	12	12	14	44	47	−3	48	
15	VfR Aalen	38	10	14	14	35	40	−5	44	
16	Wehen Wiesbaden	38	9	16	13	35	48	−13	43	
17	Werder Bremen II	38	11	10	17	42	56	−14	43	
18	Stuttgarter Kickers (R)	38	11	10	17	38	52	−14	43	Relegation to Regionalliga
19	Energie Cottbus (R)	38	9	14	15	32	52	−20	41	Relegation to Regionalliga
20	VfB Stuttgart II (R)	38	7	10	21	38	63	−25	31	Relegation to Regionalliga

Source: DFB
Rules for classification: 1) Points; 2) Goal difference; 3) Goals scored
(C) Champions; (O) Play-off winners; (P) Promoted; (R) Relegated

== Results ==
Home \ Away	AAL	AUE	BR2	CFC	FCE	SGD	ERF	SGS	HFC	KSV	FKO	FCM	MA2	PRM	OSN	ROS	SKI	ST2	WEH	FCW
VfR Aalen	—	0–2	1–2	0–0	3–0	0–0	2–2	0–1	0–0	0–0	0–2	0–0	3–2	0–0	1–0	1–1	3–0	1–0	3–1	0–1
Erzgebirge Aue	1–0	—	1–0	2–0	1–0	1–1	2–2	2–0	4–0	0–0	2–0	0–0	1–0	3–0	0–0	0–0	2–0	1–0	1–1	0–0
Werder Bremen II	1–1	4–0	—	3–2	0–2	1–2	0–1	0–4	2–0	2–1	1–3	1–1	2–1	0–0	0–1	1–1	1–0	0–1	1–0	0–0
Chemnitzer FC	1–1	1–2	2–1	—	4–0	2–2	1–1	0–2	3–1	4–2	3–1	0–0	5–1	0–1	2–1	1–1	1–0	2–1	1–0	0–1
Energie Cottbus	0–4	0–0	1–1	0–1	—	0–2	2–1	0–5	2–0	1–2	0–0	2–0	2–3	0–0	1–2	0–1	1–2	2–2	2–2	1–2
Dynamo Dresden	4–0	1–1	2–1	1–0	0–1	—	3–1	2–1	3–2	0–0	4–0	3–2	3–0	0–0	2–1	2–2	1–1	4–1	4–0	2–1
Rot-Weiß Erfurt	2–0	0–1	2–1	0–2	0–1	3–2	—	0–2	1–1	1–3	0–2	0–2	3–0	1–1	4–2	3–2	1–0	3–0	0–0	1–0
Sonnenhof Großaspach	2–0	2–0	0–1	4–2	1–1	0–0	2–2	—	0–0	0–0	1–1	1–0	0–3	3–1	3–3	0–1	1–1	1–3	0–1	1–2
Hallescher FC	3–1	1–0	6–2	1–2	1–1	0–0	2–1	4–1	—	0–2	1–1	1–2	1–1	1–3	1–0	2–0	1–1	3–0	3–0	1–3
Holstein Kiel	1–0	3–0	3–0	5–2	1–2	1–2	0–3	3–1	0–4	—	2–2	0–0	0–4	0–0	0–1	0–0	1–2	1–0	1–1	1–2
Fortuna Köln	1–1	0–2	2–1	0–3	3–0	1–5	1–3	2–2	0–2	2–3	—	2–1	3–1	2–1	3–1	5–1	3–1	1–3	4–1	0–3
1. FC Magdeburg	1–2	0–3	1–1	2–0	2–2	2–2	2–1	4–0	2–1	0–1	0–0	—	3–1	3–0	3–0	4–1	2–1	2–2	1–0	0–1
Mainz 05 II	1–0	1–1	2–2	0–0	0–1	1–1	1–0	2–1	2–0	0–0	0–1	2–2	—	2–3	0–0	4–0	1–2	3–1	0–0	1–0
Preußen Münster	0–2	0–1	3–1	3–1	3–0	2–3	2–0	1–1	0–1	2–0	3–1	1–2	0–1	—	0–0	1–1	4–2	1–2	0–0	0–0
VfL Osnabrück	2–1	0–0	3–1	2–0	0–0	0–3	1–0	2–2	2–0	3–2	1–3	2–0	1–1	2–2	—	0–1	1–1	1–1	4–0	1–1
Hansa Rostock	3–0	0–2	1–2	1–0	1–1	1–3	3–1	1–3	3–1	1–0	4–2	1–1	1–0	0–0	0–0	—	0–1	2–0	4–0	0–0
Stuttgarter Kickers	0–0	1–1	0–2	0–1	0–0	1–2	0–1	0–4	1–0	0–0	2–1	1–0	1–4	1–0	2–2	2–0	—	4–1	1–0	1–2
VfB Stuttgart II	1–1	1–2	1–1	1–1	0–1	1–1	1–2	0–3	1–1	1–3	3–0	0–1	1–1	1–3	0–1	3–1	2–1	—	1–2	0–2
Wehen Wiesbaden	0–1	1–0	3–1	1–1	0–0	2–2	3–0	2–2	1–0	3–1	3–0	0–0	1–1	0–2	0–2	0–0	3–3	3–1	—	0–0
Würzburger Kickers	2–2	1–0	1–1	1–1	2–2	1–1	0–0	0–1	0–1	1–1	4–1	1–1	1–0	3–0	0–1	2–1	2–1	0–0	0–0	—

Source: DFB
Legend: Blue = home team win; Yellow = draw; Red = away team win.

== Top goalscorers ==
Rank	Player	Club	Goals
1	(Germany) Justin Eilers	Dynamo Dresden	23
2	(Germany) Christian Beck	1. FC Magdeburg	19
3	(Germany) Pascal Testroet	Dynamo Dresden	18
4	(Germany) Marco Königs	Fortuna Köln	16
5	(Germany) Anton Fink	Chemnitzer FC	15
6	(Germany) Julius Biada	Fortuna Köln	14
7	(Germany) Julian Derstroff	Mainz 05 II	12
7	(Germany) Carsten Kammlott	Rot-Weiß Erfurt	12
9	Five players		11

== Number of teams by state ==
Position	State	Number of teams	Teams
1	Baden-Württemberg	4	VfR Aalen, SG Sonnenhof Großaspach, Stuttgart II and Stuttgarter Kickers
2	Saxony	3	Chemnitzer FC, Dynamo Dresden and Erzgebirge Aue
3	North Rhine-Westphalia	2	Fortuna Köln and Preussen Münster
3	Saxony-Anhalt	2	Hallescher FC and FC Magdeburg
5	Bavaria	1	Würzburger Kickers
5	Brandenburg	1	Energie Cottbus
5	Bremen	1	Werder Bremen II
5	Hesse	1	Wehen Wiesbaden
5	Lower Saxony	1	VfL Osnabrück
5	Mecklenburg-Vorpommern	1	Hansa Rostock
5	Rhineland-Palatinate	1	Mainz 05 II
5	Schleswig-Holstein	1	Holstein Kiel
5	Thuringia	1	Rot-Weiss Erfurt
