= Krisztián Simon =

Hungarian footballer

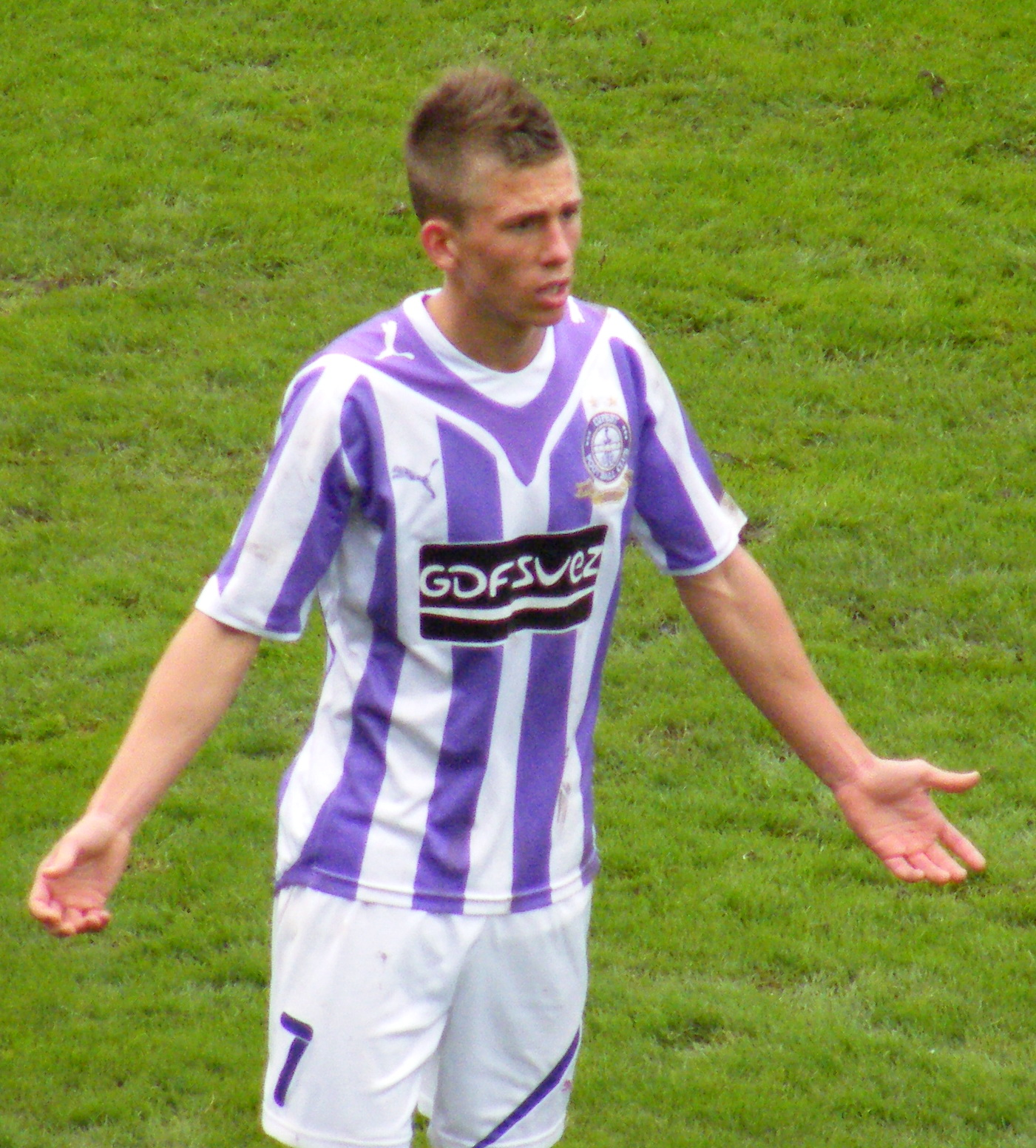

Personal information
- Full name: Krisztián Simon
- Date of birth: 10 June 1991 (age 35)
- Place of birth: Budapest, Hungary
- Height: 1.76 m (5 ft 9 in)
- Position: Right winger

Team information
- Current team: Újpest
- Number: 7

Youth career
- 2003–2009: Újpest
- 2009: Wolverhampton Wanderers

Senior career*
Years	Team	Apps	(Gls)
2009–2015	Újpest	101	(19)
2011	→ Feyenoord (loan)	8	(0)
2015–2017	1860 Munich	11	(1)
2017–2025	Újpest	153	(19)

International career^{‡}
2009–2010	Hungary U-19	19	(2)
2010–2012	Hungary U-21	6	(0)
2014	Hungary	4	(0)
- * Club domestic league appearances and goals as of 19 June 2025 ‡ National team caps and goals as of 2014-11-14

Krisztián Simon (born 10 June 1991) is a Hungarian professional footballer who plays for Újpest, as a winger.

== Career ==
=== Early career ===
In January 2009, Simon joined Wolverhampton Wanderers' under 18 side from Újpest on loan until May.

=== Újpest ===
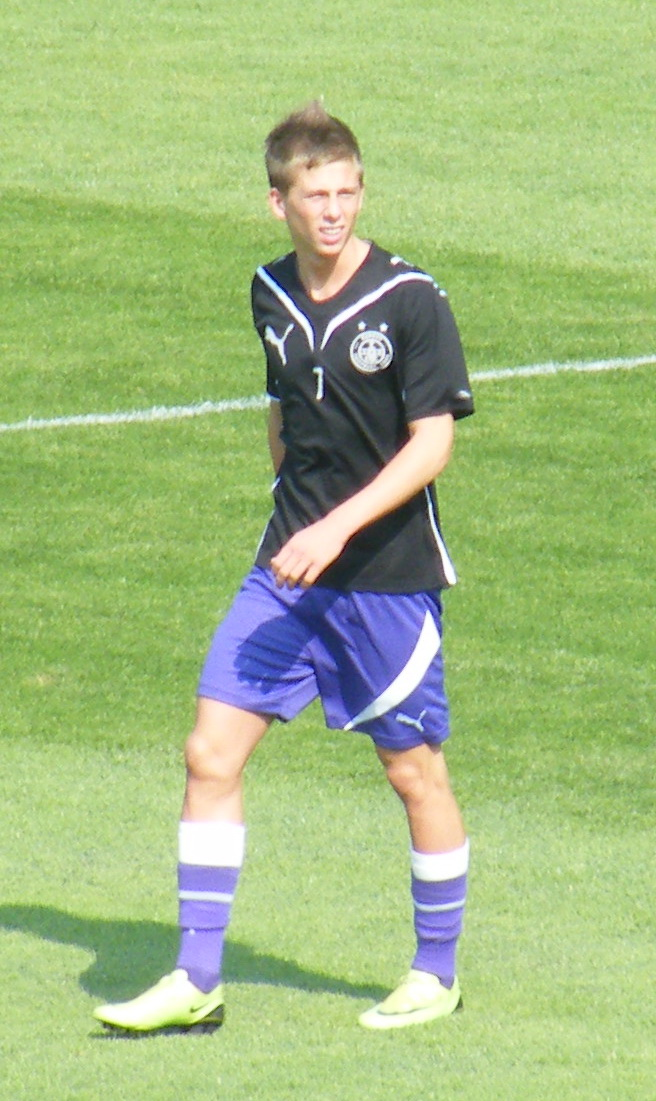
Simon playing for Újpest

Having returned to Újpest from Wolverhampton Wanderers in May 2009, Simon played his first match in the Hungarian National Championship I in September 2009 against Zalaegerszegi TE.

In July 2010, he was named best Hungarian under 19 football player of the year by Hungarian Football Association. Across the 2010–11 season he played 1129 minutes and scored two goals.

On 3 July 2012, Simon broke his sole during a training session with Újpest.

On 10 January 2015, Simon refused the offer by Charlton Athletic F.C. In an interview with Nemzeti Sport, he said that the style of Football League Championship did not suit him.

==== Feyenoord loan ====
During his first trial game in Feyenoord, on 5 January 2011, Simon significantly contributed to the victory of his team against Sparta Rotterdam in the second half by two assists and a goal. He debuted in the Amsterdam Arena against Ajax Amsterdam in the Eredivisie.

=== 1860 Munich ===
On 2 February 2015, Simon signed a contract with German 2. Bundesliga club 1860 Munich until 2018. Before 1860 Munich signed Simon, Markus von Ahlen asked former 1860 Munich goalkeeper Gábor Király and former Hertha BSC midfielder and Hungary national football team coach Pál Dárdai's opinion.

Simon gave his debut for the Munich lions on 9 February 2015 in a 1–2 home defeat against Heidenheim, when he was substituted for Maximilian Wittek in the 78th minute.

Simon was left out from the squad due to the fact that he has not acquired the German language correctly and his oversensitivity according to his coach, Torsten Fröhling.

On 13 March 2015, he scored his first goal for the first team of 1860 Munich in a 3–0 away win against Greuther Fürth, when he brought his team to a 1–0 lead in the 34th minute after an assist by Korbinian Vollmann.

=== Újpest ===
On 1 May he scored his first goal in the 2022–23 Nemzeti Bajnokság I season against Ferencváros at the Szusza Ferenc Stadion.

On 24 June 2025, Simon announced that he would end his professional career after fourteen seasons with Újpest, in which he won three Hungarian Cups and one Hungarian Championship bronze medal. He also announced that he would remain with Újpest FC and would later work with Újpest's young talents.

== International career ==
Simon played 19 matches and scored 2 goals for the Hungary U-19.

== Playing style ==
Former Újpest and current Feyenoord sport director Leo Beenhakker said that Simon is fast and audacious while playing football in an interview with Nemzeti Sport.

== Career statistics ==
As of 27 June 2020

Club	Season	League			Cup		Europe		Other		Total	
Club	Season	Division	Apps	Goals	Apps	Goals	Apps	Goals	Apps	Goals	Apps	Goals
Újpest	2009–10	Nemzeti Bajnokság I	1	0	–		–		–		1	0
Újpest	2010–11	Nemzeti Bajnokság I	15	2	2	0	–		–		17	2
Újpest	2011–12	Nemzeti Bajnokság I	22	2	5	1	–		–		27	3
Újpest	2012–13	Nemzeti Bajnokság I	20	2	1	0	–		–		21	2
Újpest	2013–14	Nemzeti Bajnokság I	26	7	7	1	–		–		33	8
Újpest	2014–15	Nemzeti Bajnokság I	17	6	2	0	–		–		19	6
Újpest	Total		101	19	17	2	0	0	0	0	118	21
Feyenoord	2010–11	Eredivisie	8	0	–		–		–		8	0
Feyenoord	Total		8	0	0	0	0	0	0	0	8	0
1860 Munich	2014–15	2. Bundesliga	8	1	–		–		1	0	9	1
1860 Munich	2015–16	2. Bundesliga	3	0	1	0	–		–		4	0
1860 Munich	Total		11	1	1	0	0	0	1	0	13	1
Újpest	2017–18	Nemzeti Bajnokság I	22	1	3	0	–		–		25	1
Újpest	2018–19	Nemzeti Bajnokság I	10	1	0	0	0	0	–		10	1
Újpest	2019–20	Nemzeti Bajnokság I	29	5	4	0	–		–		33	5
Újpest	Total		61	7	7	0	0	0	0	0	68	7
Career total			181	27	25	2	0	0	1	0	207	29

== Honours ==
Újpest

- Hungarian Cup (1): 2013–14
