= 2012–13 FC Ingolstadt 04 season =

FC Ingolstadt 04
2012–13 season
- Manager: Tomas Oral
- Stadium: Audi Sportpark, Ingolstadt, Germany
- 2. Bundesliga: 13th
- DFB-Pokal: First round
- Average home league attendance: 7,331
| Home colours | Away colours | Third colours |

The 2012–13 FC Ingolstadt 04 season was the 8th season in the club's football history. In 2012–13 the club played in the 2. Bundesliga, the second tier of German football. It was the club's third consecutive season in this league since 2010–11, having won promotion from the 3. Liga in 2010.

The club also took part in the 2012–13 edition of the DFB-Pokal, the German Cup, but was knocked out by fellow second division side VfR Aalen in the first round.

== Competitions ==
=== Friendly matches ===
Win Draw Loss Postponed

| FC Gerolfing | 1–5 | FC Ingolstadt 04 |
| | | Marvin Matip; Ahmed Akaïchi |

| FC Ingolstadt 04 | 2–0 | SK Dynamo České Budějovice |
| Leonard Haas; Manuel Schäffler |

| FC Ingolstadt 04 | 3–1 | FC Pasching |
| Ahmed Akaïchi; José-Alex Ikeng | | Goal |

| 27 July 2012 | FC Ingolstadt 04 | 2–2 | 1. FC Nürnberg | Ingolstadt |
| 18:00 CEST (UTC+02) | Christian Eigler 54', 67' | | 37' (pen.), 57' (pen.) Timo Gebhart | Stadium: Audi Sportpark; Attendance: 4,250; Referee: Dietz |

=== 2. Bundesliga ===
==== League table ====
| Pos | Team | Pld | W | D | L | GF | GA | GD | Pts | Promotion, qualification or relegation |
|---|---|---|---|---|---|---|---|---|---|---|
| 11 | MSV Duisburg (Note: MSV Duisburg were denied a license for the 2013–14 2. Bundesliga season, and, in accordance with the rules of the DFL (Deutsche Fußball Liga), Duisburg are replaced by the best-placed originally relegated team, SV Sandhausen.) (R) | 34 | 11 | 10 | 13 | 37 | 49 | −12 | 43 | Relegation to 3. Liga |
| 12 | SC Paderborn | 34 | 11 | 9 | 14 | 45 | 45 | 0 | 42 | |
| 13 | FC Ingolstadt | 34 | 10 | 12 | 12 | 36 | 43 | −7 | 42 | |
| 14 | VfL Bochum | 34 | 10 | 8 | 16 | 40 | 52 | −12 | 38 | |
| 15 | Erzgebirge Aue | 34 | 9 | 10 | 15 | 39 | 46 | −7 | 37 | |

Source: kicker.de
Rules for classification: 1) points; 2) goal difference; 3) number of goals scored.
(R) Relegated

==== Matches ====
Win Draw Loss Postponed

| 3 August 2012 1 | FC Ingolstadt 04 | 2–2 | Energie Cottbus | Ingolstadt |
| 18:00 | Leitl 18', 28' (pen.) | Report (in German) | Sanogo 80', 88' | Stadium: Audi Sportpark; Attendance: 6,517; Referee: Tobias Welz |

| 11 August 2012 2 | FC St. Pauli | 1–1 | FC Ingolstadt 04 | Hamburg |
| 15:30 CEST | Mohr 56' | Report (in German) | Eigler 55' | Stadium: Millerntor-Stadion; Attendance: 18,309; Referee: Christian Dingert |

| 26 August 2012 3 | FC Ingolstadt 04 | 0–2 | FSV Frankfurt | Ingolstadt |
| 13:30 | | Report (in German) | Kapllani 42', 77' | Stadium: Audi Sportpark; Attendance: 5,612; Referee: Robert Kampka |

| 2 September 2012 4 | SC Paderborn 07 | 1–3 | FC Ingolstadt 04 | Paderborn |
| 13:30 | Kempe 85' | Report (in German) | Biliskov 16'; Eigler 39'; Caiuby 83' | Stadium: Benteler-Arena; Attendance: 7,729; Referee: Christian Bandurski |

| 14 September 2012 5 | FC Ingolstadt 04 | 2–1 | 1. FC Union Berlin | Ingolstadt |
| 18:00 | Mijatović 17'; Schäffler 90+1' | Report (in German) | Jopek 40' | Stadium: Audi Sportpark; Attendance: 5,251; Referee: Robert Kempter |

| 23 September 2012 6 | Dynamo Dresden | 0–1 | FC Ingolstadt 04 | Dresden |
| 13:30 | | Report (in German) | Caiuby 60' | Stadium: Rudolf-Harbig-Stadion; Attendance: 24,000; Referee: Christian Fischer |

| 26 September 2012 7 | FC Ingolstadt 04 | 0–2 | 1860 Munich | Ingolstadt |
| 17:30 | | Report (in German) | Stoppelkamp 32'; Vallori 74' | Stadium: Audi Sportpark; Attendance: 14,319; Referee: Knut Kircher |

| 30 September 2012 8 | VfL Bochum | 1–1 | FC Ingolstadt 04 | Bochum |
| 13:30 | Brügmann 85' | Report (in German) | Caiuby 9' | Stadium: Ruhrstadion; Attendance: 12,017; Referee: Markus Wingenbach |

| 7 October 2012 9 | FC Ingolstadt 04 | 1–1 | 1. FC Kaiserslautern | Ingolstadt |
| 13:30 | Schäffler 80' | Report (in German) | Bunjaku 68' | Stadium: Audi Sportpark; Attendance: 7,011; Referee: Norbert Grudzinski |

| 19 October 2012 10 | MSV Duisburg | 0–2 | FC Ingolstadt 04 | Duisburg |
| 18:00 | | Report (in German) | Leitl 64'; Caiuby 88' | Stadium: MSV-Arena; Attendance: 11,577; Referee: Bibiana Steinhaus |

| 26 October 2012 11 | FC Ingolstadt 04 | 2–0 | VfR Aalen | Ingolstadt |
| 18:00 | Groß 56'; Schäffler 90+2' | Report (in German) | | Stadium: Audi Sportpark; Attendance: 5,812; Referee: Florian Steuer |

| 2 November 2012 12 | Hertha BSC | 0–0 | FC Ingolstadt 04 | Berlin |
| 18:00 | | Report (in German) | | Stadium: Olympic Stadium; Attendance: 33,156; Referee: Sascha Stegemann |

| 11 November 2012 13 | FC Ingolstadt 04 | 4–2 | Jahn Regensburg | Ingolstadt |
| 13:30 CET | Leitl 48'; Schäffler 70'; Eigler 85' (pen.); Caiuby 90' | Report (in German) | Machado 17'; Amachaibou 80' | Stadium: Audi Sportpark; Attendance: 9,473; Referee: Marcel Unger |

| 17 November 2012 14 | Eintracht Braunschweig | 3–0 | FC Ingolstadt 04 | Braunschweig |
| 13:00 | Kumbela 38', 75'; Korte 81' | Report (in German) | | Stadium: Eintracht-Stadion; Attendance: 19,430; Referee: Tobias Stieler |

| 25 November 2012 15 | FC Ingolstadt 04 | 1–1 | SV Sandhausen | Ingolstadt |
| 13:30 CET | Eigler 19' | Report (in German) | Klotz 82' | Stadium: Audi Sportpark; Attendance: 6,547; Referee: Christian Fischer |

| 28 November 2012 16 | FC Ingolstadt 04 | 1–2 | Erzgebirge Aue | Ingolstadt |
| 17:30 | Leitl 44' (pen.) | Report (in German) | Hensel 20'; Hochscheidt 60' | Stadium: Audi Sportpark; Attendance: 4,305; Referee: Daniel Siebert |

| 2 December 2012 17 | 1. FC Köln | 1–0 | FC Ingolstadt 04 | Cologne |
| 13:30 | Ujah 45' | Report (in German) | | Stadium: RheinEnergieStadion; Attendance: 38,500; Referee: Felix Zwayer |

| 9 December 2012 18 | Energie Cottbus | 1–1 | FC Ingolstadt 04 | Cottbus |
| 13:30 | Sanogo 5' | Report (in German) | Mijatović 79' | Stadium: Stadion der Freundschaft; Attendance: 6,745; Referee: Frank Willenborg |

| 15 December 2012 19 | FC Ingolstadt 04 | 0–0 | FC St. Pauli | Ingolstadt |
| 13:30 | | Report (in German) | | Stadium: Audi Sportpark; Attendance: 6,648; Referee: Jochen Drees |

| 3 February 2013 20 | FSV Frankfurt | 0–2 | FC Ingolstadt 04 | Frankfurt |
| 13:30 | | Report (in German) | Lappe 57'; Caiuby 67' | Stadium: Stadion am Bornheimer Hang; Attendance: 3,056; Referee: Robert Kampka |

| 10 February 2013 21 | FC Ingolstadt 04 | 1–3 | SC Paderborn | Ingolstadt |
| 13:30 | Mitsanski 68' | Report (in German) | Kachunga 27'; Bertels 84'; Meha 87' | Stadium: Audi Sportpark; Attendance: 4,021; Referee: Martin Petersen |

| 16 February 2013 22 | 1. FC Union Berlin | 1–1 | FC Ingolstadt 04 | Köpenick, Berlin |
| 13:00 | Nemec 85' | Report (in German) | Florian Heller 66' | Stadium: Stadion An der Alten Försterei; Attendance: 15,461; Referee: Norbert Grudzinski |

| 23 February 2013 23 | FC Ingolstadt 04 | 1–1 | Dynamo Dresden | Ingolstadt |
| 13:00 | Hartmann 14' | Report (in German) | Ouali 83' | Stadium: Audi Sportpark; Attendance: 6,300; Referee: Christian Fischer |

| 3 March 2013 24 | TSV 1860 Munich | 1–1 | FC Ingolstadt 04 | Munich |
| 13:30 | Tomasov 27' | Report (in German) | Eigler 79' | Stadium: Allianz Arena; Attendance: 24,100; Referee: Christian Dietz |

| 10 March 2013 25 | FC Ingolstadt 04 | 2–1 | VfL Bochum | Ingolstadt |
| 13:30 | Groß 56'; Caiuby 64' | Report (in German) | Goretzka 61' | Stadium: Audi Sportpark; Attendance: 6,101; Referee: Christian Bandurski |

| 17 March 2013 26 | 1. FC Kaiserslautern | 3–0 | FC Ingolstadt 04 | Kaiserslautern |
| 13:30 | Bunjaku 42' (pen.), 71'; Idrissou 87' | Report (in German) | | Stadium: Fritz-Walter-Stadion; Attendance: 24,353; Referee: Bibiana Steinhaus |

| 30 March 2013 27 | FC Ingolstadt 04 | 0–1 | MSV Duisburg | Ingolstadt |
| 13:00 | | Report (in German) | Jovanović 16' | Stadium: Audi Sportpark; Attendance: 5,546; Referee: Robert Kempter |

| 5 April 2013 28 | VfR Aalen | 2–1 | FC Ingolstadt 04 | Aalen |
| 18:00 | Reichwein 20'; Dausch 54' (pen.) | Report (in German) | Caiuby 25' (pen.) | Stadium: Scholz-Arena; Attendance: 10,784; Referee: Tobias Christ |

| 12 April 2013 29 | FC Ingolstadt 04 | 1–1 | Hertha BSC | Ingolstadt |
| 18:00 | Caiuby 14' | Report (in German) | Ben-Hatira 64' | Stadium: Audi Sportpark; Attendance: 9,167; Referee: Frank Willenborg |

| 19 April 2013 30 | Jahn Regensburg | 1–2 | FC Ingolstadt 04 | Regensburg |
| 18:00 | Sembolo 22' | Report (in German) | Korkmaz 7'; Heller 29' | Stadium: Jahnstadion; Attendance: 5,322; Referee: Norbert Grudzinski |

| 26 April 2013 31 | FC Ingolstadt 04 | 0–1 | Eintracht Braunschweig | Ingolstadt |
| 18:00 | | Report (in German) | Vrančić 90+2' | Stadium: Audi Sportpark; Attendance: 9,471; Referee: Martin Petersen |

| 4 May 2013 32 | SV Sandhausen | 3–1 | FC Ingolstadt 04 | Sandhausen |
| 13:00 | Adler 7'; Fießer (yellow card) 40'; Wooten 58', 83' | Report (in German) | Eigler 26'; Matip (yellow card) 66'; Schäffler (yellow card) 84' | Stadium: Hardtwaldstadion; Attendance: 2,850; Referee: Florian Steuer |

| 12 May 2013 33 | Erzgebirge Aue | 0–1 | FC Ingolstadt 04 | Aue |
| 13:30 | | Report (in German) | Caiuby 64' | Stadium: Erzgebirgsstadion; Attendance: 11,800; Referee: Tobias Stieler |

| 19 May 2013 34 | FC Ingolstadt 04 | 0–3 | 1. FC Köln | Ingolstadt |
| 13:30 | | Report (in German) | Royer 48'; Bruno Nascimento 76'; Ujah 77' (pen.) | Stadium: Audi Sportpark; Attendance: 12,520; Referee: Knut Kircher |

=== DFB-Pokal ===
Win Draw Loss Postponed

| 19 August 2012 First round | VfR Aalen | 3–0 | FC Ingolstadt | Aalen |
| 16:00 | Lechleiter 15'; Dausch 35'; Valentini 90+3' | Report | | Stadium: Städtisches Waldstadion; Attendance: 2,800; Referee: Marcel Unger |
