= Manuel Schäffler =

German footballer

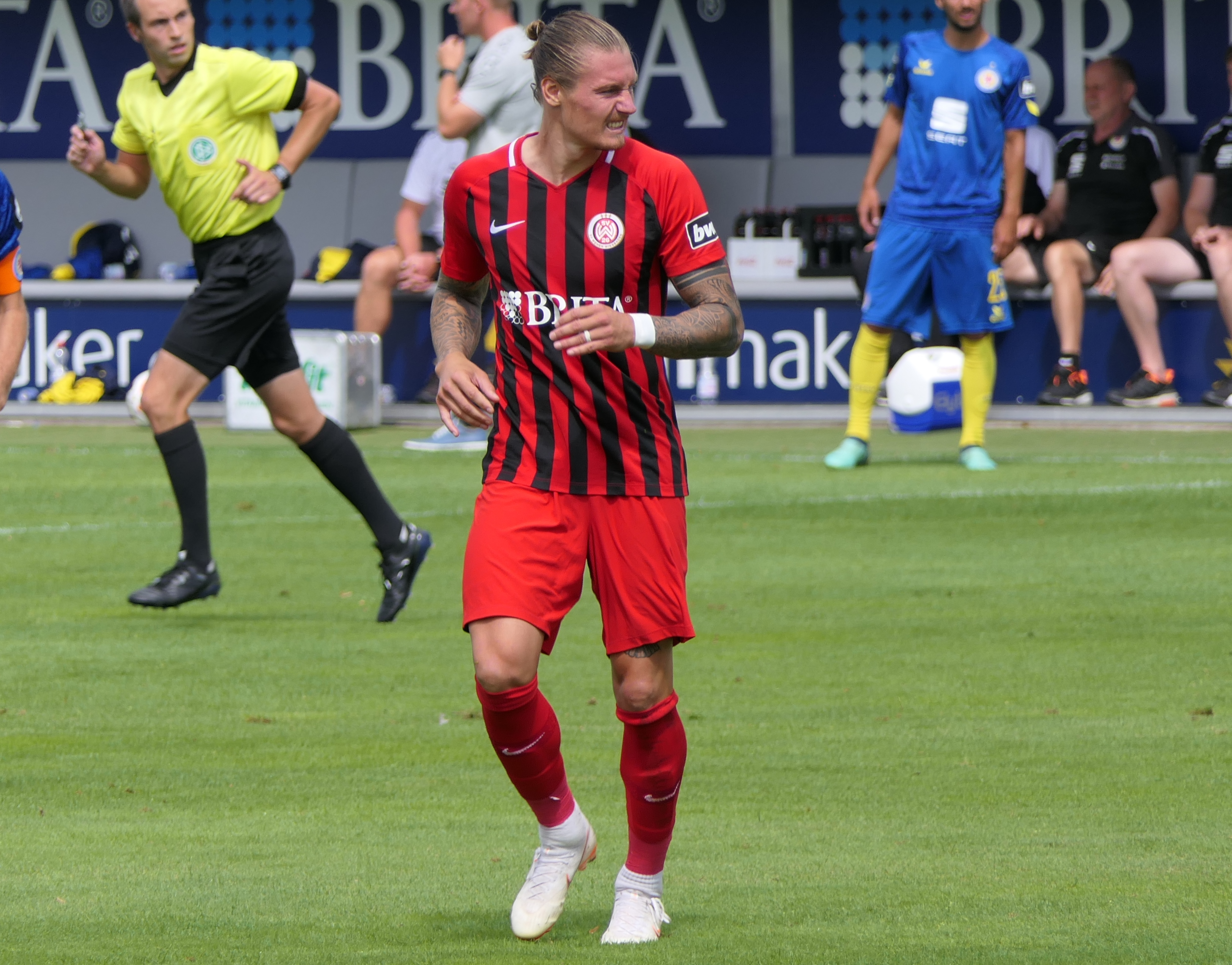
- Schäffler with Wehen Wiesbaden in 2018

Personal information
- Full name: Manuel Schäffler
- Date of birth: 6 February 1989 (age 37)
- Place of birth: Fürstenfeldbruck, West Germany
- Height: 1.86 m (6 ft 1 in)
- Position: Striker

Youth career
- –2001: TSV Moorenweis
- 2001–2007: 1860 Munich

Senior career*
Years	Team	Apps	(Gls)
2007–2012	1860 Munich	57	(5)
2007–2012	→ 1860 Munich II	52	(15)
2010–2011	→ MSV Duisburg (loan)	21	(4)
2012–2014	FC Ingolstadt 04	41	(6)
2012–2014	→ FC Ingolstadt II	4	(1)
2014–2016	Holstein Kiel	84	(13)
2016–2020	Wehen Wiesbaden	136	(70)
2020–2022	1. FC Nürnberg	49	(14)
2022–2024	Dynamo Dresden	51	(7)

International career
2008–2009	Germany U-20	7	(2)
- * Club domestic league appearances and goals as of 22 May 2024

Manuel Schäffler (born 6 February 1989) is a German professional footballer who plays as a striker.

== Career ==
Schäffler was born in Fürstenfeldbruck. In summer 2016, he joined 3. Liga side Wehen Wiesbaden.

On 21 July 2022, Schäffler signed a two-year contract with Dynamo Dresden.

== Career statistics ==
As of match played 20 April 2024

Appearances and goals by club, season and competition
Club	Season	League			Cup		Other		Total	
Club	Season	Division	Apps	Goals	Apps	Goals	Apps	Goals	Apps	Goals
1860 Munich II	2006–07	Regionalliga Süd	5	0	—		—		5	0
1860 Munich II	2007–08	Regionalliga Süd	24	7	—		—		24	7
1860 Munich II	2008–09	Regionalliga Süd	4	1	—		—		4	1
1860 Munich II	2009–10	Regionalliga Süd	16	6	—		—		16	6
1860 Munich II	2011–12	Regionalliga Süd	3	1	—		—		3	1
1860 Munich II	Total		52	15	0	0	0	0	52	15
1860 Munich	2007–08	2. Bundesliga	1	0	0	0	—		1	0
1860 Munich	2008–09	2. Bundesliga	32	4	0	0	—		32	4
1860 Munich	2009–10	2. Bundesliga	10	0	1	0	—		11	0
1860 Munich	2011–12	2. Bundesliga	14	1	1	0	—		15	1
1860 Munich	Total		57	5	2	0	0	0	59	5
MSV Duisburg (loan)	2010–11	2. Bundesliga	21	4	4	1	—		25	5
FC Ingolstadt 04	2011–12	2. Bundesliga	10	2	0	0	—		10	2
FC Ingolstadt 04	2012–13	2. Bundesliga	23	4	0	0	—		23	4
FC Ingolstadt 04	2013–14	2. Bundesliga	8	0	1	1	—		9	1
FC Ingolstadt 04	Total		41	6	1	1	0	0	42	7
FC Ingolstadt 04 II	2011–12	Regionalliga Süd	1	0	—		—		1	0
FC Ingolstadt 04 II	2012–13	Regionalliga Bayern	1	1	—		—		1	1
FC Ingolstadt 04 II	2013–14	Regionalliga Bayern	2	0	—		—		2	0
FC Ingolstadt 04 II	Total		4	1	0	0	0	0	4	1
Holstein Kiel	2013–14	3. Liga	10	0	0	0	—		10	0
Holstein Kiel	2014–15	3. Liga	37	10	1	0	2 (Note: Appearances in 2015 2. Bundesliga Play-offs)	0	40	10
Holstein Kiel	2015–16	3. Liga	37	3	1	0	—		38	3
Holstein Kiel	Total		84	13	2	0	2	0	88	13
Wehen Wiesbaden	2016–17	3. Liga	36	13	0	0	—		36	14
Wehen Wiesbaden	2017–18	3. Liga	36	22	2	0	—		38	22
Wehen Wiesbaden	2018–19	3. Liga	32	16	2	1	2	0	36	17
Wehen Wiesbaden	2019–20	2. Bundesliga	32	19	0	0	—		32	19
Wehen Wiesbaden	Total		136	70	4	1	2	0	142	71
1. FC Nürnberg	2020–21	2. Bundesliga	24	10	0	0	—		24	10
1. FC Nürnberg	2021–22	2. Bundesliga	25	4	2	0	—		27	4
1. FC Nürnberg	Total		49	14	2	0	0	0	51	14
Dynamo Dresden	2022–23	3. Liga	33	4	1	0	—		34	5
Dynamo Dresden	2023–24	3. Liga	18	3	—		—		18	3
Dynamo Dresden	Total		51	7	1	0	0	0	52	7
Career total			495	135	16	3	4	0	515	138
