= Fabian Arndt =

German footballer

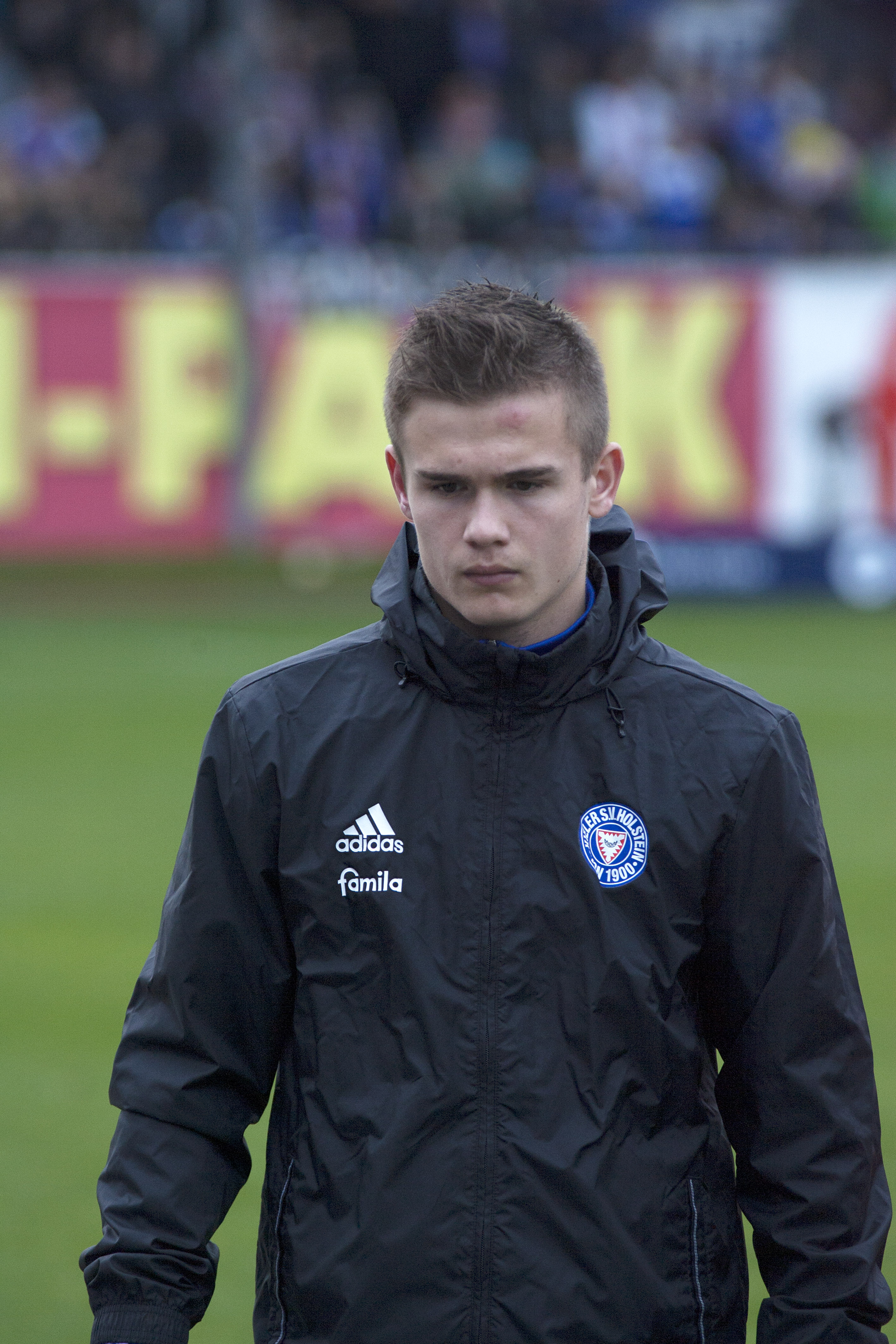
- Arndt in 2015

Personal information
- Date of birth: 8 September 1995 (age 31)
- Place of birth: Horstedt, Germany
- Height: 1.82 m (6 ft 0 in)
- Position: Forward

Team information
- Current team: Heider SV
- Number: 7

Youth career
- SZ Arlewatt
- –2009: SG Husum/Rödemis
- 2009–2010: JSG Hattstedt/Arlewatt
- 2010–2011: FC Angeln 02
- 2011–2014: Holstein Kiel

Senior career*
| Years | Team | Apps | (Gls) |
| 2014–2016 | Holstein Kiel | 4 | (0) |
| 2014–2016 | Holstein Kiel II | 53 | (38) |
| 2016–2018 | Weiche Flensburg | 45 | (6) |
| 2016–2018 | Weiche Flensburg II | 3 | (4) |
| 2018–2021 | Husumer SV | 21 | (5) |
| 2021– | Heider SV | 35 | (6) |
- * Club domestic league appearances and goals as of 22 October 2022

Fabian Arndt (born 8 September 1995) is a German footballer who plays as a forward for Heider SV.

== Career ==
Arndt made his professional debut for Holstein Kiel in the 3. Liga on 25 January 2014, coming on as a substitute in the 61st minute for Marcel Schied in the 0–0 home draw against Stuttgarter Kickers.
