= Finn Wirlmann =

German footballer (born 1996)

Personal information
- Date of birth: 18 July 1996 (age 30)
- Place of birth: Germany
- Height: 1.89 m (6 ft 2 in)
- Position: Midfielder

Team information
- Current team: Holstein Kiel II
- Number: 8

Youth career
- SV Grün-Weiß Todenbüttel
- FC Fockbek
- –2010: Büdelsdorfer TSV
- 2010–2015: Holstein Kiel

Senior career*
Years	Team	Apps	(Gls)
2014–2017	Holstein Kiel	21	(1)
2015–2016	Holstein Kiel II	11	(0)
2016–2017	→ ETSV Weiche (loan)	17	(0)
2017–2024	Weiche Flensburg	102	(5)
2024–	Holstein Kiel II	12	(1)
- * Club domestic league appearances and goals as of 20 June 2026

Finn Wirlmann (born 18 July 1996) is a German footballer who plays as a midfielder for Holstein Kiel II.

== Career ==
Wirlmann made his professional debut for Holstein Kiel in the 3. Liga on 9 August 2014, coming on as a substitute in the 76th minute for Manuel Hartmann in the 1–0 away loss against VfB Stuttgart II. For the 2016–17 season, he was loaned by Kiel to ETSV Weiche in the Regionalliga Nord. Following the season, he joined the club (then renamed to SC Weiche Flensburg 08) on a permanent basis.
