= Boubacar Barry (footballer, born 1996) =

German professional footballer

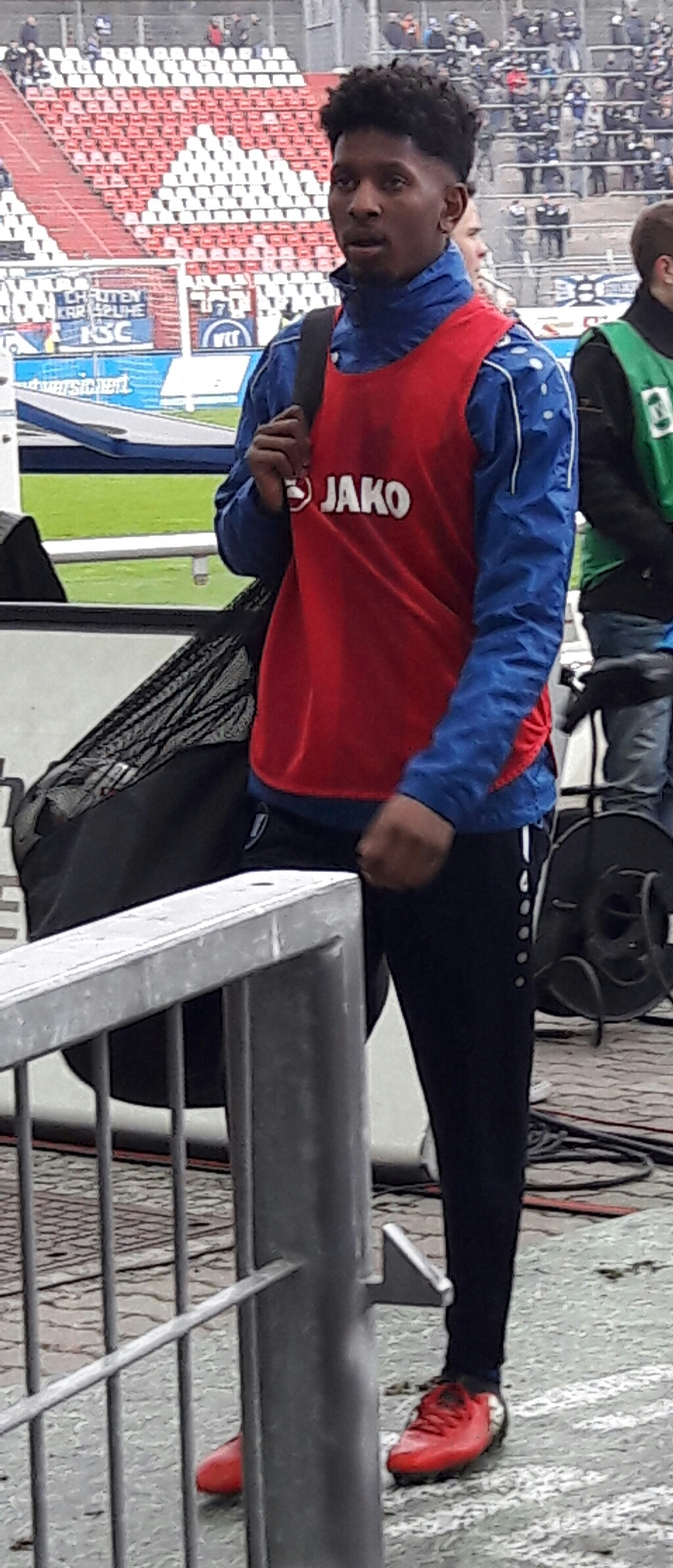
- Barry with Karlsruher SC in 2016

Personal information
- Date of birth: 15 April 1996 (age 30)
- Place of birth: Conakry, Guinea
- Height: 1.82 m (6 ft 0 in)
- Position: Attacking midfielder

Team information
- Current team: Kickers Offenbach
- Number: 10

Youth career
- –2010: SVK Beiertheim
- 2010–2012: SV Sandhausen
- 2012–2014: Karlsruher SC

Senior career*
Years	Team	Apps	(Gls)
2014–2017	Karlsruher SC	34	(1)
2017–2020	Werder Bremen II	16	(2)
2019–2020	→ KFC Uerdingen 05 (loan)	33	(0)
2020–2022	Türkgücü München	31	(2)
2023–2024	Astoria Walldorf	38	(9)
2024–	Kickers Offenbach	50	(11)

International career
2014	Germany U18	2	(0)
2014–2015	Germany U19	10	(0)
2015–2016	Germany U20	6	(2)
- * Club domestic league appearances and goals as of 26 June 2026

Boubacar Barry (born 15 April 1996) is a professional footballer who plays as an attacking midfielder for Kickers Offenbach. Born in Guinea, he is a former youth international for Germany.

== Club career ==
Barry joined Karlsruher SC in 2012 from SV Sandhausen. He made his 2. Bundesliga debut on 19 October 2014 against VfR Aalen replacing Park Jung-bin after 88 minutes in a 0–0 home draw. In his time at Karlsruhe, he made 34 league appearances scoring one goal.

In August 2017, Barry moved to the Werder Bremen reserves. During the 2018–19 injuries limited him to ten appearances in which scored two goals and assisted five in the fourth-tier Regionalliga Nord.

In July 2019, he agreed an extension of his contract which was due to expire in 2020 and joined 3. Liga side KFC Uerdingen 05 on loan for the 2019–20 season.

Barry moved to 3. Liga club Türkgücü München on a free transfer in September 2020. He left the club after it filed for insolvency in early 2022.

== International career ==
Barry was born in Guinea but moved to Germany at a young age. He is a youth international for Germany.
