= René Guder =

German footballer

Personal information
- Date of birth: 6 September 1994 (age 32)
- Place of birth: Hamburg, Germany
- Height: 1.83 m (6 ft 0 in)
- Position: Forward

Team information
- Current team: Weiche Flensburg 08
- Number: 18

Youth career
- –2011: VfL Maschen
- 2012–2013: Hamburger SV

Senior career*
Years	Team	Apps	(Gls)
2012–2013	Hamburger SV II	1	(0)
2013–2017	Holstein Kiel II	82	(41)
2015–2017	Holstein Kiel	8	(1)
2016–2017	→ ETSV Weiche (loan)	32	(15)
2017–2018	ETSV Weiche	29	(16)
2018–2019	Wehen Wiesbaden	10	(0)
2019–2022	SV Meppen	115	(13)
2022–	Weiche Flensburg 08	131	(19)
- * Club domestic league appearances and goals as of 20 June 2026

René Guder (born 6 September 1994) is a German professional footballer who plays as a forward for ETSV Weiche

== Career ==
Having spent the 2016–17 season at ETSV Weiche on loan from Holstein Kiel, Guder joined the fourth-tier club permanently for the 2017–18 season. In summer 2018, he joined 3. Liga side SV Wehen Wiesbaden. He made two assists in ten matches during the first half of the season. In January 2019 Guder moved to league rivals SV Meppen on a free transfer, having agreed a contract until summer 2020.
