= Fiete Sykora =

German footballer

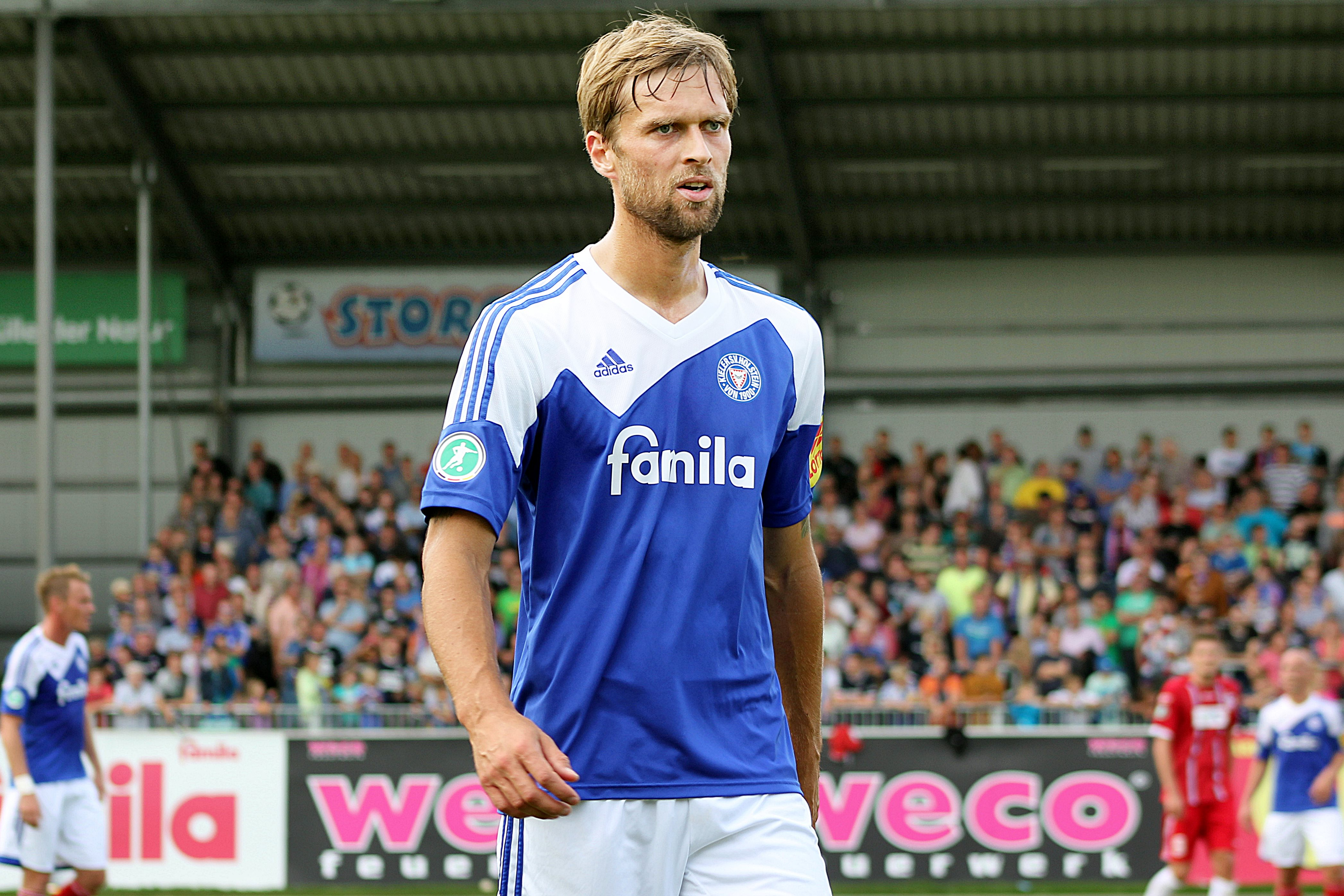
- Fiete Sykora in 2013

Personal information
- Full name: Fiete Sykora
- Date of birth: 16 September 1982 (age 44)
- Place of birth: Wismar, East Germany
- Height: 1.86 m (6 ft 1 in)
- Position: Striker

Youth career
- TSG Wismar
- NDTSV Holsatia Kiel
- –2000: TSG Wismar
- 2000–2001: Hansa Rostock

Senior career*
Years	Team	Apps	(Gls)
2001–2005	Hansa Rostock II	108	(19)
2005–2007	Carl Zeiss Jena	59	(15)
2007–2008	Erzgebirge Aue	18	(4)
2008–2009	VfL Osnabrück	28	(4)
2009–2015	Holstein Kiel	154	(41)
2015–2018	SC Weiche Flensburg 08	68	(20)
- * Club domestic league appearances and goals as of 22:42, 16 July 2018 (UTC)

Fiete Sykora (born 16 September 1982) is a retired German footballer who played as a striker.

== Career ==
Sykora made his debut on the professional league level in the 2. Bundesliga for FC Carl Zeiss Jena on 11 August 2006 when starting in a game against Kickers Offenbach.
