= Jarosław Lindner =

Polish footballer

Personal information
- Date of birth: 28 June 1988 (age 38)
- Place of birth: Gdańsk, Poland
- Height: 1.75 m (5 ft 9 in)
- Position: Striker

Youth career
- Janowianka Janów Lubelski
- –2003: Jantar Pruszcz Gdański
- 2003–2007: Hannover 96

Senior career*
| Years | Team | Apps | (Gls) |
| 2007–2010 | Hannover 96 II | 77 | (22) |
| 2009–2010 | Hannover 96 | 1 | (0) |
| 2010–2015 | Holstein Kiel | 103 | (31) |
| 2015–2016 | Wehen Wiesbaden | 18 | (1) |
| 2016–2020 | Sportfreunde Lotte | 104 | (12) |
| 2020–2022 | Schwarz-Weiß Rehden | 12 | (2) |
| 2022–2023 | Sportfreunde Lotte | 15 | (0) |
- * Club domestic league appearances and goals as of 28 June 2024

Jarosław Lindner (born Jarosław Ciarczyński on 28 June 1988) is a Polish professional footballer who plays as a striker.

== Career ==
Born in Gdańsk, Lindner played with Polish side Janowianka Janów in his youth before moving to the Hannover 96 youth teams in August 2003. Lindner made his professional debut in the Bundesliga as a substitute in the 1–0 loss to 1899 Hoffenheim on 29 August 2009.

From 2010 to 2015, Lindner played for German third division side Holstein Kiel. On 11 August 2015, Lindner transferred to SV Wehen Wiesbaden on a two-year contract. On 21 August 2016, he transferred again to Sportfreunde Lotte, signing on a one-year deal.
