= Torsten Fröhling =

German footballer & coach (born 1966)

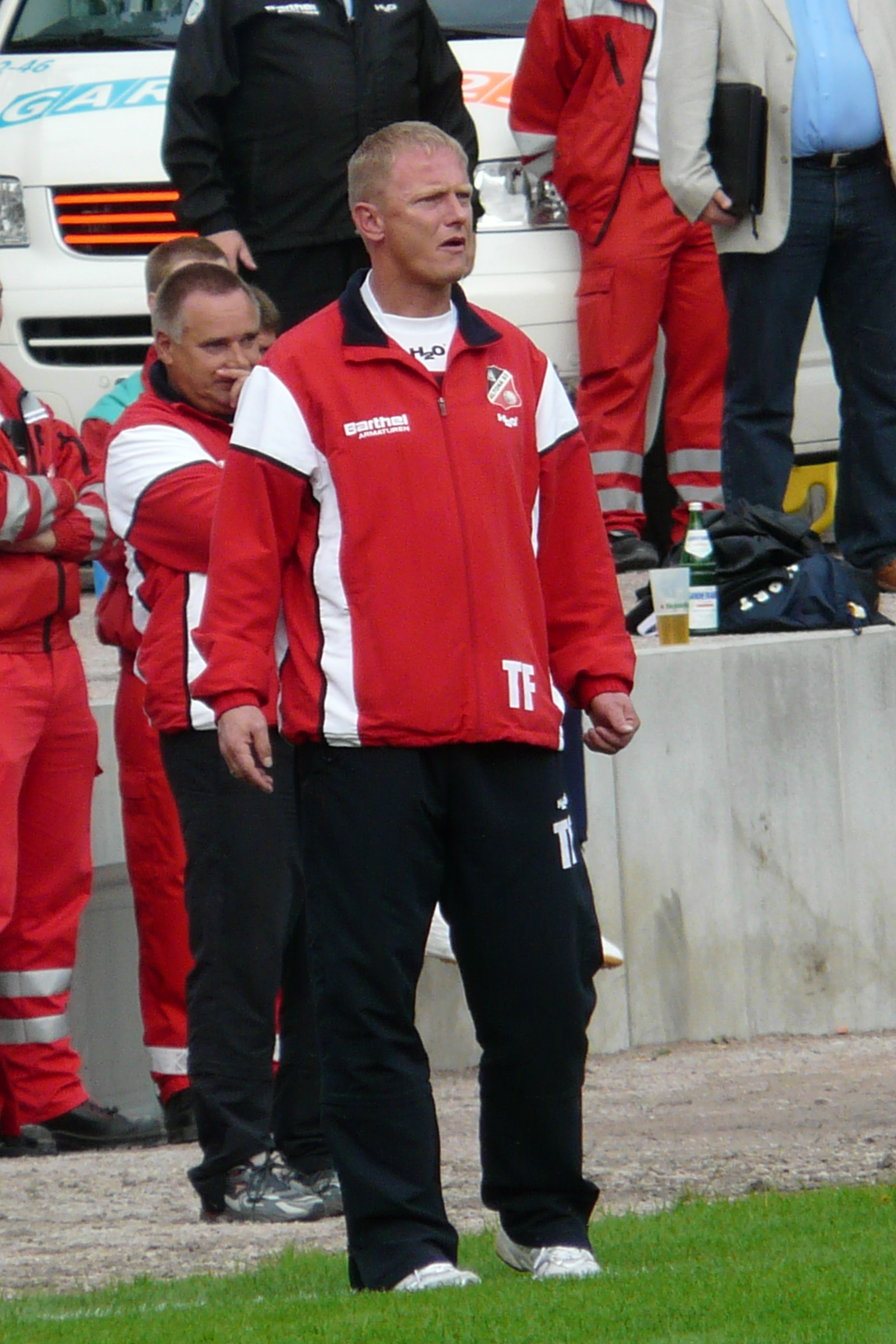
- Fröhling in 2008

Personal information
- Date of birth: 24 August 1966 (age 60)
- Place of birth: Bützow, East Germany
- Height: 1.86 m (6 ft 1 in)
- Position: Defender

Youth career
- –1987: Motor Schönebeck

Senior career*
Years	Team	Apps	(Gls)
1987–1988	Motor Schönebeck		
1988–1989	Stahl Eisenhüttenstadt	8	(0)
1989–1991	Hamburger SV	1	(0)
1991–1997	FC St. Pauli	91	(2)
1997–1998	VfB Lübeck	9	(0)
Total		109	(2)

Managerial career
- 2007–2009: Altona 93
- 2009–2010: Holstein Kiel II
- 2009: Holstein Kiel
- 2010–2011: VfB Oldenburg
- 2013–2015: 1860 Munich II
- 2015: 1860 Munich
- 2016–2017: Wehen Wiesbaden
- 2018–2022: Schalke 04 II
- * Club domestic league appearances and goals

Torsten Fröhling (born 24 August 1966) is a German football coach and former player. He has been head coach of Altona 93, Holstein Kiel II, Holstein Kiel, VfB Oldenburg, 1860 Munich II, 1860 Munich, Wehen Wiesbaden and Schalke 04 II.

== Playing career ==
During his playing career, he played for Motor Schönebeck, Stahl Eisenhüttenstadt, Hamburger SV, FC St. Pauli, and VfB Lübeck.

== Coaching career ==
=== Early career (2007–2013) ===
Fröhling was head coach of the Eintracht Norderstedt A Junior team until 1 July 2007 when he became head coach of Altona 93. His first match in–charge was a 3–1 loss to Holstein Kiel. In his first season, he finished second in the Oberliga Nord. He was there until 25 February 2009. His final match was a 1–0 win against FC Oberneuland. He finished his reign with a record of 25 wins, 11 draws, and 15 losses in 51 matches. Then he became an assistant coach of Holstein Kiel along with being the head coach of the reserve team. He started on 3 July 2009. His first match as the reserve team head coach was a 1–0 win against VfB Lübeck II. He won the Schleswig-Holstein-Liga. He finished his reign at Holstein Kiel II with a record of 26 wins, four draws, and four losses in 34 matches. Fröhling replaced Falko Götz as head coach on an interim basis on 17 September 2009 until Christian Wück was hired on 5 October 2009. He finished with a record of two wins and a loss in three matches. He had a 1–0 win against 1. FC Heidenheim, a 5–3 loss against Wuppertaler SV, and a 2–0 win against VfB Stuttgart II. He was head coach of VfB Oldenburg between 1 July 2010 and 18 April 2011. He made his debut for the club on 8 August 2010 in a 2–2 draw against Teutonia Uelzen. His final match was a 2–2 draw on 17 April 2011 against SC Langenhagen. He finished his reign with a record of 12 wins, six draws, and nine losses. He was a head coach in Hamburger SV's youth academy from 1 July 2011 until 5 June 2013 when he became head coach of 1860 Munich II.

=== 1860 Munich (2013–2015) ===
Fröhling was head coach of 1860 Munich II from 5 June 2013 until 17 February 2015 when he was appointed interim head coach of first team of 1860 Munich. His first match in–charge was a 1–1 draw against Bayern Hof. The team won two of its first seven matches. Then they went on a seven match winning streak. In his first season as head coach of the reserve team, he finished third in the Regionalliga Bayern. He started his second season in–charge with a 3–0 win against SV Seligenporten on 11 July 2014. His final match as head coach of the reserve team was a 1–0 loss to SpVgg Bayreuth. He finished his tenure as reserve team coach with a record of 37 wins, nine draws, and 12 losses.

He was appointed interim head coach of 1860 Munich's first team on 17 February 2015 after Uwe Rosler rejected an offer to become head coach. He became the third head coach during the 2014–15 season after Ricardo Moniz, who picked up six points from seven matches, and Markus von Ahlen, who won three of his 15 matches in–charge. The club had picked up three points in seven matches (21 available points) prior to his hiring and is in a relegation battle. He won his first match in–charge 2–1 against FC St. Pauli on 21 February 2015. In the Bavarian derby, on 2 March 2015, 1860 Munich and Ingolstadt 04 finished in a 1–1 draw. His first loss was a 3–2 loss to SV Sandhausen on 8 March 2015. The loss left 1860 Munich in 15th place and a point above the relegation zone. In his second Bavarian derby, on 13 March 2015, 1860 Munich won 3–0 against Greuther Fürth. On 20 March 2015, 1860 Munich remained in 15th place after a 1–1 draw against VfR Aalen. Then on 5 April 2015, 1860 Munich lost 1–0 to Erzgebirge Aue. They remained in 15th place. However, their lead was reduced to a point over the relegation zone. On 11 April 2015, 1860 Munich lost 2–0 to Eintracht Braunschweig. Despite the loss, the club remained in 15th place. 1860 Munich again remained in 15th place after a 2–1 win against VfL Bochum. However, they remained only one point above the relegation playoff spot and a point above direct relegation after St. Pauli and Erzgebirge Aue won and two points above last place team VfR Aalen after they won. Then, on 25 April 2015, 1860 Munich and Fortuna Düsseldorf finished in a 1–1 draw. Then 1860 Munich dropped down into the relegation zone (17th place) after losing 3–0 to Union Berlin on 3 May 2015. 1860 Munich defeated FSV Frankfurt 1–0 on 8 May 2015. Despite the win, the club remained in the relegation zone. On 17 May 2015, in a Bavarian derby, 1860 Munich defeated 1. FC Nürnberg 2–1. The win took them to 15th place, one place above the relegation play–off spot. On 24 May 2015, 1860 Munich lost 2–0 to Karlsruher SC. FSV Frankfurt won their match against Fortuna Düsseldorf and 1860 Munich dropped down into the relegation play–off against Holstein Kiel. In the first leg, on 29 May 2015, 1860 Munich and Holstein Kiel finished in a 0–0 draw. On 2 June 2015, in the second leg, 1860 Munich defeated Holstein Kiel 2–1 to avoid relegation. During his time as interim coach, he became popular with the players and the players want him to continue.

On 20 June 2015, Fröhling extended his contract at 1860 Munich. The season started with a pair of 1–0 losses to 1. FC Heidenheim and SC Freiburg. Their third match of the season was a German Cup win against 1899 Hoffenheim. His winless run in the league continued with six draws and two losses. 1860 drew against 1. FC Nürnberg and Union Berlin then lost to VfL Bochum and Fortuna Düsseldorf. then drew against 1. FC Kaiserslautern, SV Sandhausen, RB Leipzig, and Arminia Bielefeld. The draw against Arminia Bielefeld proved to be the final match. He was sacked on 6 October 2015 and replaced by Benno Möhlmann. He finished with a record of seven wins, 10 draws, and nine losses.

=== Wehen Wiesbaden (2016–2017) ===
He was selected as the new head coach of Wehen Wiesbaden on 14 March 2016. His debut was a 0–0 draw against Energie Cottbus on 19 March 2016. His first win came against Erzgebirge Aue on 15 April 2016. He was sacked on 6 February 2017. His final match was a 3–0 loss to Sportfreunde Lotte. He finished with a record of eight wins, nine draws, and 12 losses.

=== Schalke 04 II (2018–2022) ===
Fröhling became head coach of FC Schalke 04 II on 26 June 2018. He was sacked on 28 March 2022.

== Personal life ==
Fröhling was born on 24 August 1966 in Bützow, East Germany.

== Coaching record ==
As of matches played 25 March 2022

Team	From	To	Record								
Team	From	To	M	W	D	L	GF	GA	GD	Win %	Ref.
Altona 93	1 July 2007	25 February 2009	51	25	11	15	103	64	+39	49.02	
Holstein Kiel II	3 July 2009	30 June 2010	34	26	4	4	106	27	+79	76.47	
Holstein Kiel	17 September 2009	5 October 2009	3	2	0	1	6	5	+1	66.67	
VfB Oldenburg	1 July 2010	18 April 2011	27	12	6	9	57	41	+16	44.44	
1860 Munich II	5 June 2013	17 February 2015	58	37	9	12	117	63	+54	63.79	
1860 Munich	17 February 2015	6 October 2015	26	7	10	9	26	31	−5	26.92	
Wehen Wiesbaden	14 March 2016	6 February 2017	29	8	9	12	29	39	−10	27.59	
Schalke 04 II	16 June 2018	28 March 2022	129	58	31	40	221	145	+76	44.96	
Total			362	176	83	103	665	415	+250	48.62	—
