= Tim Siedschlag =

German footballer

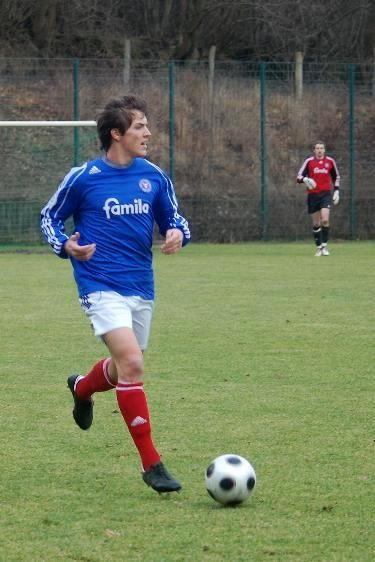
- Siedschlag with Holstein Kiel

Personal information
- Date of birth: 26 September 1987 (age 39)
- Place of birth: Neumünster, West Germany
- Height: 1.81 m (5 ft 11 in)
- Position: Midfielder

Team information
- Current team: Holstein Kiel II
- Number: 21

Youth career
- –2005: SV Tungendorf
- 2005–2006: Holstein Kiel

Senior career*
| Years | Team | Apps | (Gls) |
| 2006–2010 | Holstein Kiel | 90 | (15) |
| 2010–2011 | VfB Lübeck | 31 | (4) |
| 2011–2018 | Holstein Kiel | 171 | (19) |
| 2017– | Holstein Kiel II | 84 | (16) |
- * Club domestic league appearances and goals as of 1 July 2022

Tim Siedschlag (born 26 September 1987) is a German professional footballer who plays as a midfielder for Holstein Kiel II.

== Career ==
Siedschlag joined Holstein Kiel in 2005. Having made the first team in 2007, he joined VfB Lübeck for the 2010–11 season.

In May 2018, it was announced that Siedschlag had agreed a contract extension until 2021 with Holstein Kiel.
