= Patrick Herrmann (footballer, born 1988) =

German footballer

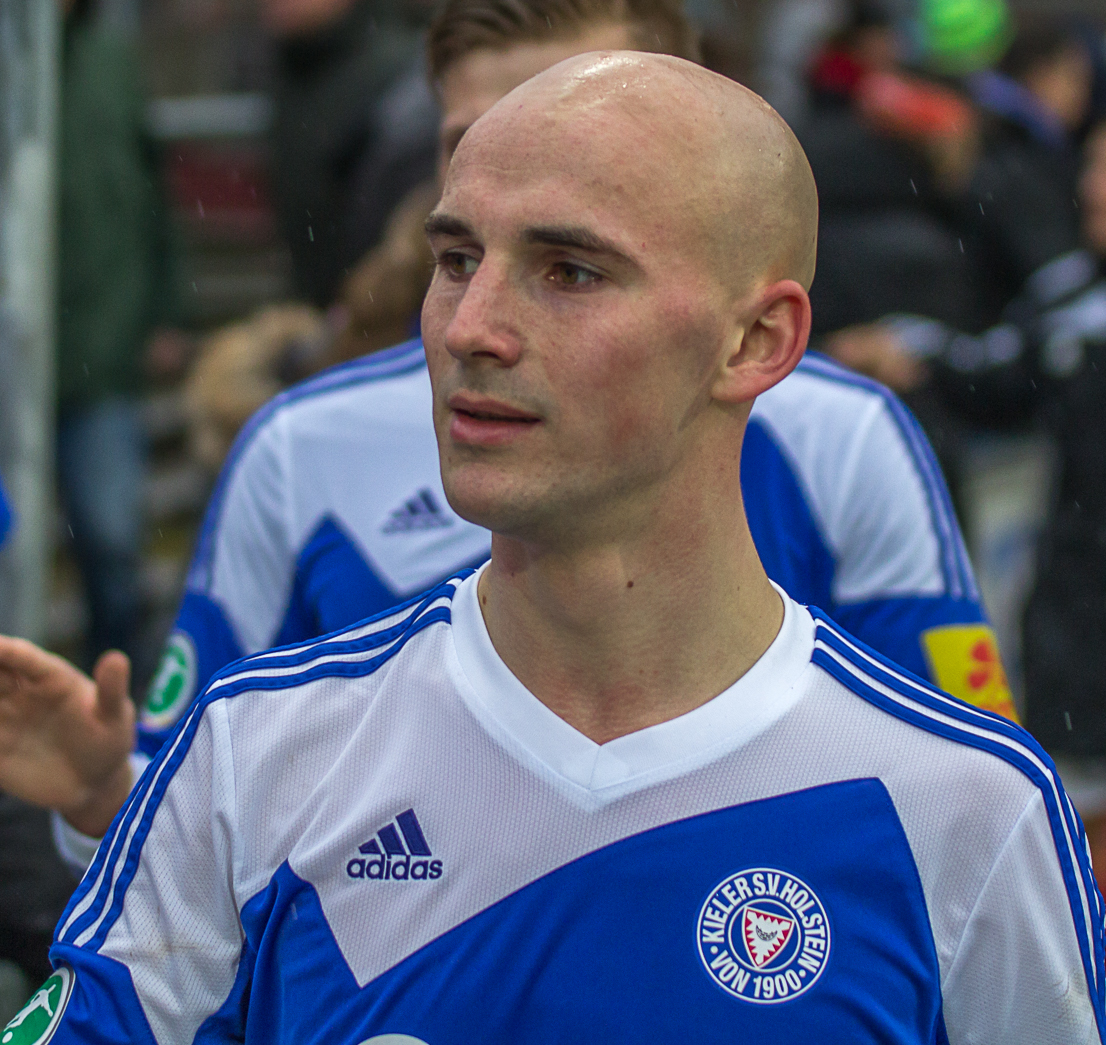
- Herrmann with Holstein Kiel in 2014

Personal information
- Date of birth: 16 March 1988 (age 38)
- Place of birth: Berlin, Germany
- Height: 1.80 m (5 ft 11 in)
- Position: Right-back

Team information
- Current team: SC Weiche Flensburg 08
- Number: 4

Youth career
- TSV Wipshausen
- Eintracht Braunschweig
- VfL Wolfsburg
- 2003–2007: Hannover 96

Senior career*
Years	Team	Apps	(Gls)
2007–2009	Hannover 96 II	44	(2)
2008–2009	Hannover 96	3	(0)
2009–2010	VfL Osnabrück	10	(0)
2009–2011	VfL Osnabrück II	40	(1)
2011–2018	Holstein Kiel	247	(2)
2019–2021	Darmstadt 98	62	(0)
2021–2023	SC Weiche Flensburg 08	60	(4)
Total		466	(9)
- * Club domestic league appearances and goals

Patrick Herrmann (born 16 March 1988) is a German professional former footballer.
