= Manuel Hartmann =

German footballer

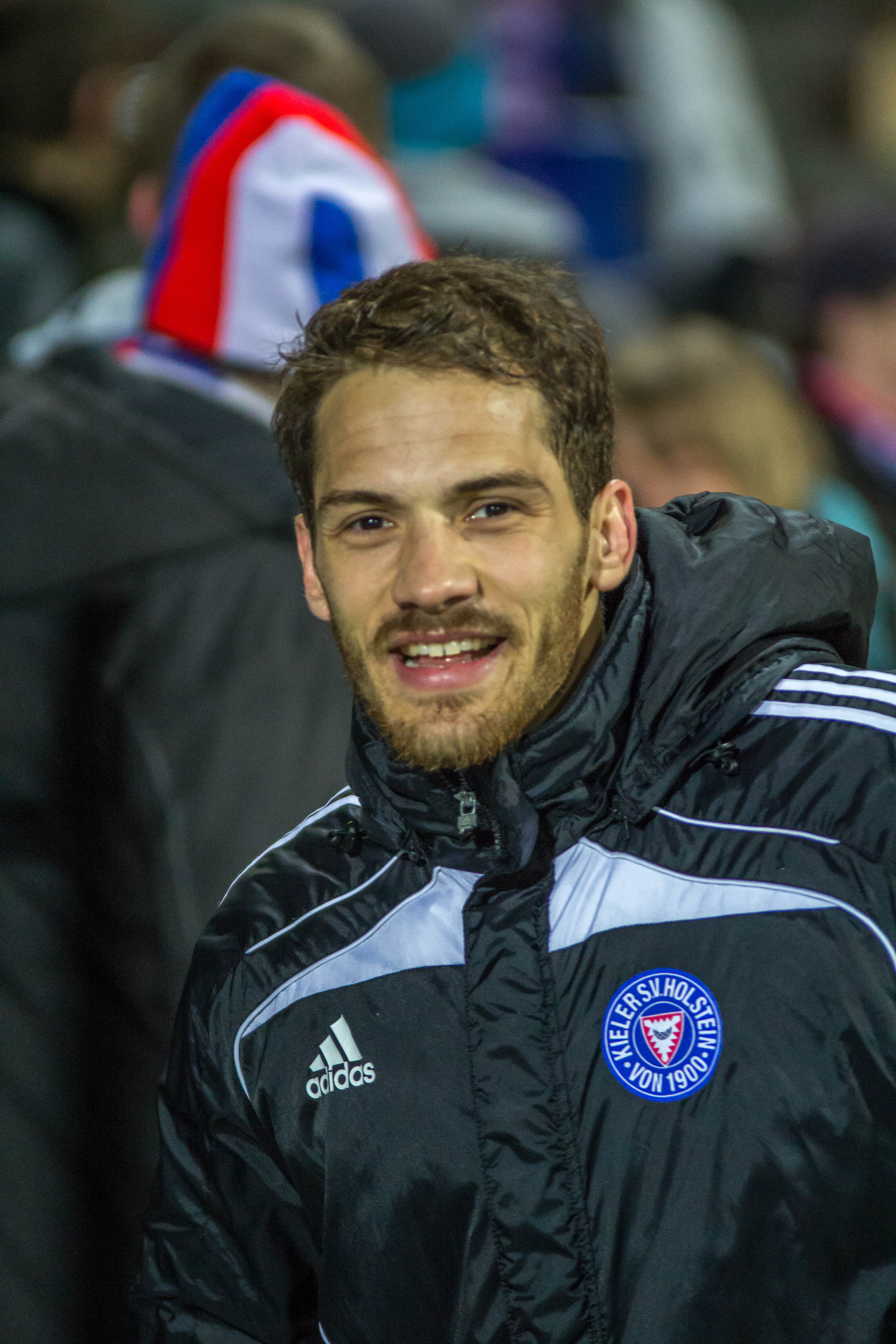
- Hartmann in 2014

Personal information
- Date of birth: 26 March 1984 (age 42)
- Place of birth: Esslingen am Neckar, West Germany
- Height: 1.88 m (6 ft 2 in)
- Position: Midfielder

Youth career
- –1999: SG Eintracht Sirnau
- 1999–2003: VfL Kirchheim/Teck

Senior career*
Years	Team	Apps	(Gls)
2003–2005	SGV Freiberg	61	(3)
2005–2007	Stuttgarter Kickers	57	(6)
2007–2010	TuS Koblenz	90	(7)
2010–2012	FC Ingolstadt	22	(1)
2012–2016	Holstein Kiel	92	(2)
2012–2016	Holstein Kiel II	11	(0)
2016–2017	TSV Schilksee	12	(1)
2017	Kilia Kiel	1	(0)
Total		346	(20)

Managerial career
- 2016: TSV Schilksee
- 2018–2026: 1. FC Köln (youth)
- 2026–: 1. FC Köln II
- * Club domestic league appearances and goals

Manuel Hartmann (born 26 March 1984) is a German former professional footballer who played as a midfielder.

== Career ==
Hartmann was born in Esslingen am Neckar, Baden-Württemberg. He made his debut on the professional league level in the 2. Bundesliga for TuS Koblenz on 12 August 2007 when he came on as a half-time substitute for Frank Wiblishauser in a game against Mainz 05.

In May 2016, Hartmann signed for fifth-tier side TSV Schilksee.
