= Patrick Breitkreuz =

German footballer

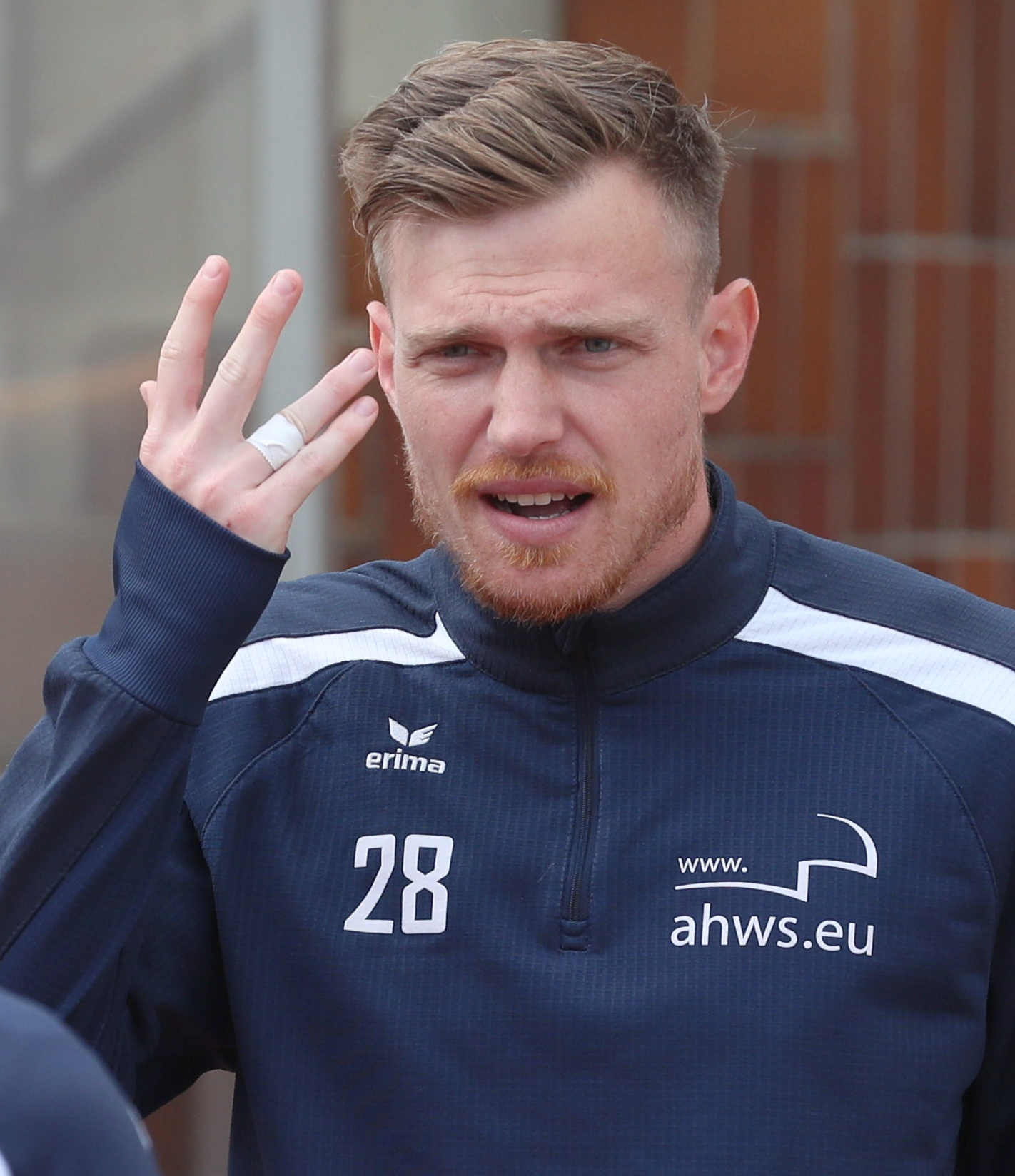

Personal information
- Date of birth: 18 January 1992 (age 34)
- Place of birth: Berlin, Germany
- Height: 1.86 m (6 ft 1 in)
- Position: Forward

Team information
- Current team: BFC Preussen
- Number: 29

Youth career
- –2006: Lichterfelder FC
- 2006–2010: Hertha BSC

Senior career*
Years	Team	Apps	(Gls)
2010–2013	Hertha BSC II	62	(6)
2013–2015	Holstein Kiel	66	(7)
2013–2014	Holstein Kiel II	2	(1)
2015–2016	Energie Cottbus	34	(7)
2017–2018	SV Wehen Wiesbaden	31	(4)
2018–2020	Würzburger Kickers	34	(2)
2020–2023	VSG Altglienicke	72	(16)
2023–	BFC Preussen	82	(44)

International career
2009	Germany U-17	2	(0)
- * Club domestic league appearances and goals as of 22 June 2026

Patrick Breitkreuz (born 18 January 1992) is a German footballer who plays as a forward for German club BFC Preussen. He is the twin brother of fellow footballer Steve Breitkreuz.

In 2009, he earned two caps for the German national under-17 team.

== Career ==
On 31 January 2020, the last day of the winter transfer period, Breitkreuz left 3. Liga side Würzburger Kickers for VSG Altglienicke who were looking to gain promotion from the Regionalliga Nordost.
