= Marcel Gebers =

German footballer

Personal information
- Date of birth: 5 June 1986 (age 40)
- Place of birth: Soltau, West Germany
- Height: 1.89 m (6 ft 2 in)
- Positions: Centre-back; defensive midfielder

Youth career
- TSV Neuenkirchen
- MTV Soltau
- –2004: Eintracht Braunschweig
- 2004–2005: SC Langenhagen

Senior career*
Years	Team	Apps	(Gls)
2005–2008	TuS Heeslingen		
2008–2012	VfB Lübeck	127	(18)
2012–2015	Holstein Kiel	60	(9)
2015–2016	Kickers Offenbach	28	(2)
2016–2017	FSV Zwickau	9	(0)
2017–2019	SV Meppen	53	(4)
- * Club domestic league appearances and goals

Marcel Gebers (born 5 June 1986) is a German former professional footballer who played as a centre-back or defensive midfielder.

== Career ==
In January 2017, Gebers joined Regionalliga Nord side SV Meppen from 3. Liga club FSV Zwickau. He was forced to retire in December 2019 due to knee and hip injuries.
