= Rafael Kazior =

German footballer

Personal information
- Date of birth: 7 February 1983 (age 43)
- Place of birth: Gliwice, Poland
- Height: 1.86 m (6 ft 1 in)
- Position: Forward

Youth career
- 1. SC Norderstedt
- Hamburger SV
- 1997–2001: FC St. Pauli

Senior career*
Years	Team	Apps	(Gls)
2001–2003	FC St. Pauli II	65	(30)
2003–2004	MSV Duisburg	4	(0)
2004–2006	Wacker Burghausen	50	(3)
2006–2007	Holstein Kiel	19	(3)
2007	Holstein Kiel II	7	(1)
2007–2008	Rot-Weiss Essen	30	(2)
2008–2011	Hamburger SV II	95	(36)
2011–2015	Holstein Kiel	133	(22)
2015–2018	Werder Bremen II	102	(20)
Total		505	(117)
- * Club domestic league appearances and goals

Rafael Kazior (Polish: Rafał Kazior; born 7 February 1983) is a German retired professional footballer who played as a forward.

== Career ==
On 12 September 2003, Kazior made his professional debut in the 2. Bundesliga for MSV Duisburg.

In May 2018, following Werder Bremen II's relegation from the 3. Liga, it was announced Kazior would end his career and start working as a video analyst for Werder Bremen's first team under Florian Kohfeldt.

== Career statistics ==
Appearances and goals by club, season and competition
Club	Season	League			Cup		Other		Total	
Club	Season	Division	Apps	Goals	Apps	Goals	Apps	Goals	Apps	Goals
MSV Duisburg	2003–04	2. Bundesliga	4	0	1	0	–		5	0
Wacker Burghausen	2004–05	2. Bundesliga	29	2	0	0	–		29	2
Wacker Burghausen	2005–06	2. Bundesliga	21	1	1	0	–		22	1
Wacker Burghausen	Total		50	3	1	0	0	0	51	3
Holstein Kiel	2006–07	Regionalliga Nord	19	3	0	0	0	0	19	0
Holstein Kiel II	2006–07	Oberliga Nord	7	1	–		–		7	1
Rot-Weiss Essen	2007–08	Regionalliga Nord	30	2	3	0	0	0	33	2
Hamburger SV II	2008–09	Regionalliga Nord	33	9	0	0	–		33	9
Hamburger SV II	2009–10	Regionalliga Nord	30	13	0	0	–		30	13
Hamburger SV II	2010–11	Regionalliga Nord	32	14	0	0	–		32	14
Hamburger SV II	Total		95	36	0	0	0	0	95	36
Holstein Kiel	2011–12	Regionalliga Nord	33	7	4	2	–		37	9
Holstein Kiel	2012–13	Regionalliga Nord	30	3	0	0	2 (Note: Appearances in promotion play-offs)	0	32	3
Holstein Kiel	2013–14	3. Liga	35	1	0	0	–		35	1
Holstein Kiel	2014–15	3. Liga	35	11	0	0	2 (Note: Appearances in relegation play-offs)	1	37	2
Holstein Kiel	Total		133	22	4	2	4	1	141	25
Werder Bremen II	2015–16	3. Liga	36	7	0	0	–		36	7
Werder Bremen II	2016–17	3. Liga	34	4	0	0	–		34	4
Werder Bremen II	2017–18	3. Liga	32	9	0	0	–		32	9
Werder Bremen II	Total		102	20	0	0	0	0	92	20
Career total			440	87	9	2	4	1	454	90
