= Karsten Neitzel =

German footballer and manager (born 1967)

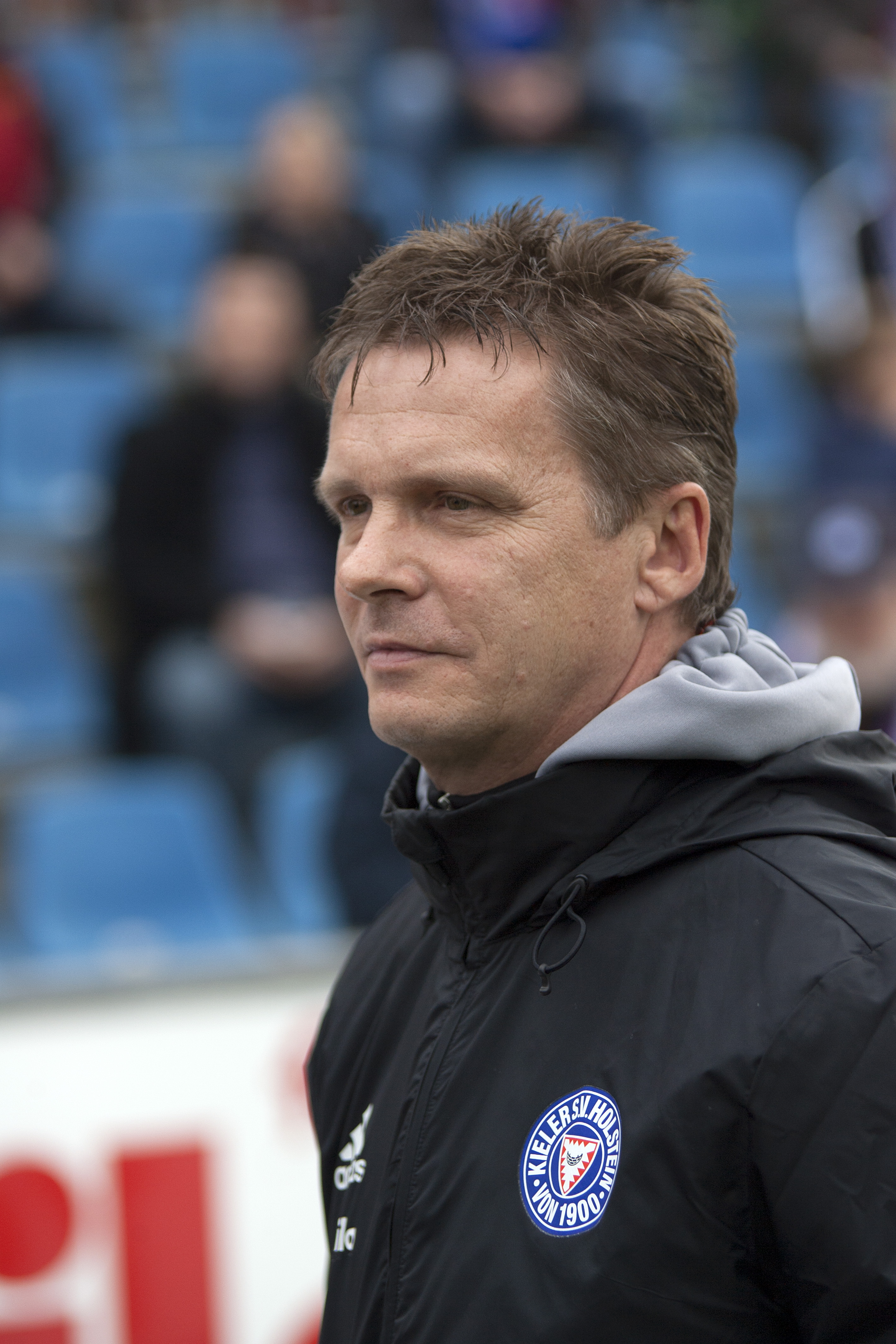
- Neitzel in 2015

Personal information
- Date of birth: 17 December 1967 (age 58)
- Place of birth: Dresden, East Germany
- Height: 1.76 m (5 ft 9 in)
- Position: Midfielder

Youth career
- 1977–1980: BSG Robotron Radeberg
- 1980–1986: Dynamo Dresden

Senior career*
Years	Team	Apps	(Gls)
1985–1989	Dynamo Dresden II	69	(5)
1985–1989	Dynamo Dresden	10	(0)
1989–1991	Chemie Halle	48	(1)
1991–1992	Hallescher FC	23	(1)
1992–1994	Stuttgarter Kickers	79	(1)
1994–1997	SC Freiburg	18	(0)
Total		247	(8)

International career
- East Germany U-21

Managerial career
- 1997–2007: SC Freiburg (assistant)
- 1997–2008: SC Freiburg II
- 2009–2010: Urawa Red Diamonds (assistant)
- 2011–2012: VfL Bochum (assistant)
- 2012–2013: VfL Bochum (caretaker)
- 2013–2016: Holstein Kiel
- 2017–2018: SV Elversberg
- 2018–2019: Rot-Weiss Essen
- 2021–2022: Selangor
- 2022: Selangor (assistant)
- * Club domestic league appearances and goals

Karsten Neitzel (born 17 December 1967) is a former German football player and former manager. He previously served as both head and assistant coach (to Michael Feichtenbeiner) of Malaysia Super League club Selangor.

== Managerial career ==
=== VfL Bochum ===
On 8 April 2013, Neitzel was sacked as the manager of VfL Bochum.

=== Selangor ===
In 16 November 2020, he was appointed as the manager of Malaysia Super League club Selangor

In 21 November 2021, he was appointed as assistant coach under Michael Feichtenbeiner of Malaysia Super League club Selangor

== Career statistics ==
Appearances and goals by club, season and competition
Club	Season	League			Cup		Continental		Total	
Club	Season	Division	Apps	Goals	Apps	Goals	Apps	Goals	Apps	Goals
Dynamo Dresden II	1985–86	DDR-Liga	0	0			—		0	0
Dynamo Dresden II	1986–87	DDR-Liga	21	0			—		21	0
Dynamo Dresden II	1987–88	DDR-Liga	24	2			—		24	2
Dynamo Dresden II	1988–89	DDR-Liga	24	3			—		24	3
Dynamo Dresden II	Total		69	5			0	0	69	5
Dynamo Dresden	1985–86	DDR-Oberliga	6	0			0	0	6	0
Dynamo Dresden	1986–87	DDR-Oberliga	3	0			—		3	0
Dynamo Dresden	1987–88	DDR-Oberliga	0	0			0	0	0	0
Dynamo Dresden	1988–89	DDR-Oberliga	1	0			0	0	1	0
Dynamo Dresden	Total		10	0			0	0	10	0
Chemie Halle	1989–90	DDR-Oberliga	23	1			—		23	1
Chemie Halle	1990–91	NOFV-Oberliga	25	0			—		25	0
Chemie Halle	Total		48	1			0	0	48	1
Hallescher FC	1991–92	2. Bundesliga	23	1	2	0	1	0	26	1
Stuttgarter Kickers	1992–93	2. Bundesliga	44	1	1	0	—		45	1
Stuttgarter Kickers	1993–94	2. Bundesliga	35	0	1	0	—		36	0
Stuttgarter Kickers	Total		79	1	2	0	0	0	81	1
SC Freiburg	1994–95	Bundesliga	5	0	1	0	—		6	0
SC Freiburg	1995–96	Bundesliga	11	0	1	0	0	0	12	0
SC Freiburg	1996–97	Bundesliga	2	0	1	0	—		3	0
SC Freiburg	Total		18	0	3	0	0	0	21	0
Career total			247	8	7	0	1	0	255	8

== Managerial statistics ==
As of 20 November 2021

Managerial record by team and tenure
Team	Nat.	From	To	Record					Ref.
Team	Nat.	From	To	G	W	D	L	Win%	Ref.
SC Freiburg II	(Germany)	1 July 1999	31 December 2008	291	138	69	84	47.42	
VfL Bochum	(Germany)	25 October 2012	8 April 2013	20	6	5	9	30.00	
Holstein Kiel	(Germany)	1 July 2013	16 August 2016	134	51	42	41	38.06	
SV Elversberg	(Germany)	1 July 2017	11 March 2018	28	13	8	7	46.43	
RW Essen	(Germany)	8 April 2018	4 June 2019	48	21	10	17	43.75	
Selangor	(Malaysia)	1 December 2020	20 November 2021	30	14	6	10	46.67	
Career Total				551	243	140	168	44.10	
