= Städtisches Waldstadion =

Multi-purpose stadium in Aalen, Germany

OSTALB ARENA
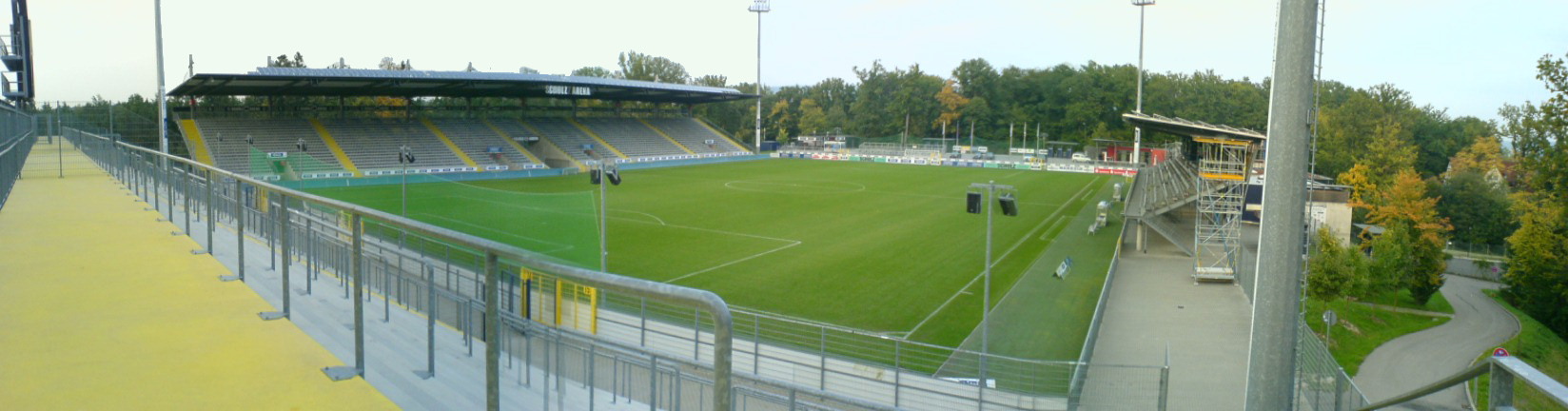
- Interactive map of OSTALB ARENA
- Former names: VfR-Stadion im Rohrwang; Städtisches Waldstadion; Scholz Arena
- Location: Aalen, Germany
- Coordinates: 48°50′26″N 10°04′20″E
- Owner: City of Aalen
- Capacity: 14,500
- Surface: Grass

Construction
- Built: 1948
- Opened: 1949
- Renovated: 1964-1966; 2001-2003

Tenant
- VfR Aalen

Städtisches Waldstadion, known as OSTALB ARENA for sponsorship purposes, is a multi-purpose stadium in Aalen, Germany. It is currently used mostly for football matches and is the home stadium of VfR Aalen. The stadium is able to hold 14,500 people.

== Capacity ==
Area	Quantity
Seating (North and south stands)	4,685 (roofed)
Standing (East and west stands)	9,815 (thereof: 3,335 roofed)
Total	14,500
