= Markus von Ahlen =

German football manager and player (born 1971)

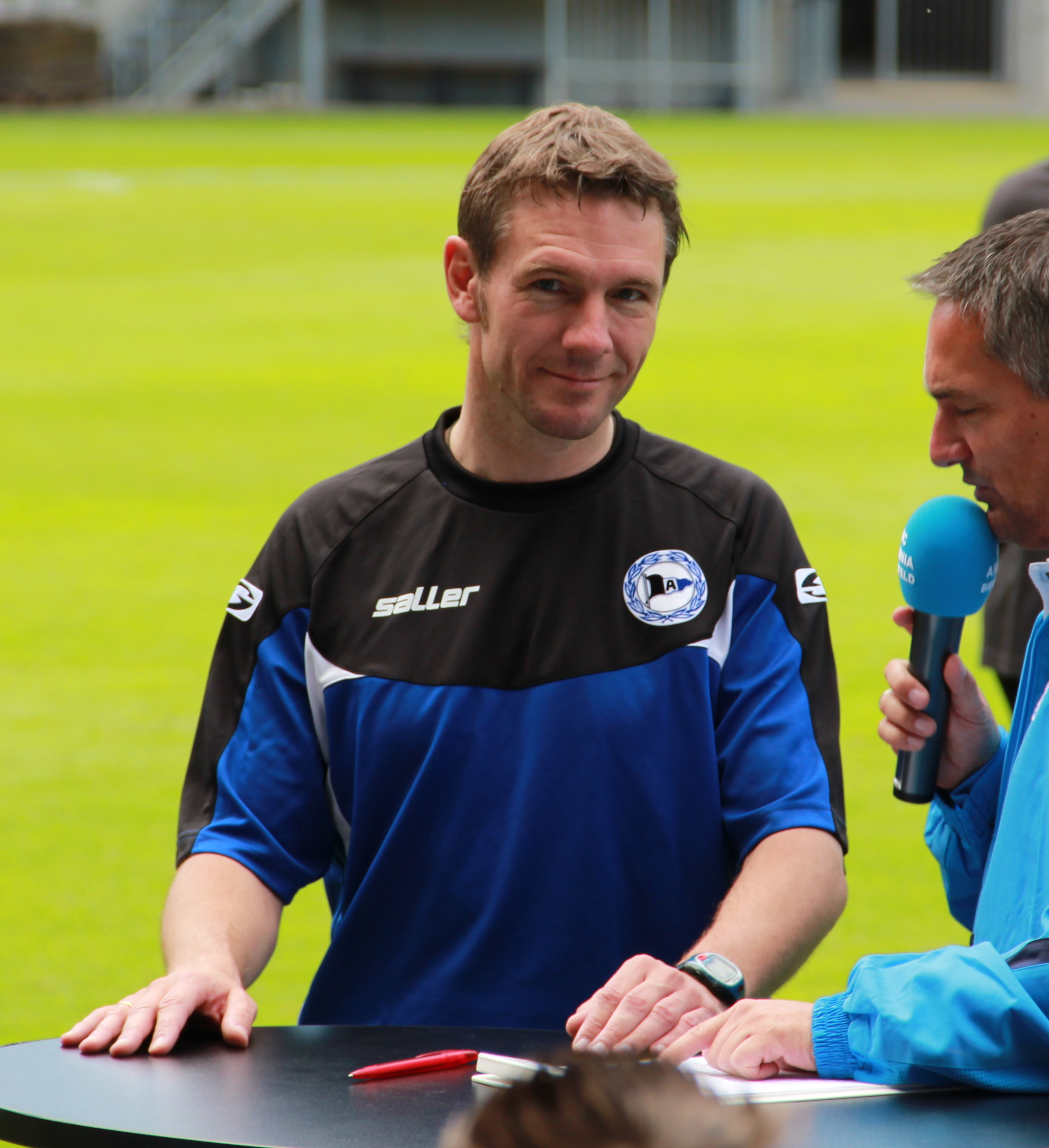
- Von Ahlen being interviewed while manager of Arminia Bielefeld in 2011

Personal information
- Date of birth: 1 January 1971 (age 55)
- Place of birth: Bergisch Gladbach, West Germany
- Height: 1.82 m (6 ft 0 in)
- Positions: Midfielder; defender

Team information
- Current team: Fortuna Köln (manager)

Youth career
- Jan-Wellem Bergisch-Gladbach
- Bayer Leverkusen

Senior career*
Years	Team	Apps	(Gls)
1989–1993	Bayer Leverkusen	24	(1)
1994–1995	VfL Bochum	29	(3)
1995–1998	SV Meppen	70	(7)
1998–1999	KFC Uerdingen 05	22	(1)
1999–2002	Alemannia Aachen	42	(2)
Total		187	(14)

Managerial career
- 2007–2008: Bayer Leverkusen (youth)
- 2008–2011: Hamburger SV U17
- 2011: Arminia Bielefeld
- 2011–2012: Kapfenberger SV (assistant)
- 2012–2014: 1860 Munich II
- 2013: 1860 Munich
- 2014: 1860 Munich
- 2014–2015: 1860 Munich
- 2016–2020: Bayer Leverkusen U19
- 2022: Bonner SC
- 2022–: Fortuna Köln
- * Club domestic league appearances and goals

Markus von Ahlen (born 1 January 1971) is a German football manager and a former player. He manages the Under-19 squad of Fortuna Köln.

== Coaching career ==
von Ahlen started his coaching career in the youth section at Bayer Leverkusen in 2007 before moving to the youth section at Hamburger SV in 2008. He then signed a two–year deal on 18 April 2011 to become the new head coach of Arminia Bielefeld starting at the beginning of the 2011–12 season. However, his tenure ended prematurely on 20 September 2011. He failed to win any of his 11 competitive matches. He then became an assistant coach for Kapfenberger SV before moving to the reserve team of 1860 München on 20 December 2012 until the end of the season. Then he became an assistant coach with 1860 München until he became interim head coach on 6 April 2014. He was given the mandate for the rest of the 2013–14 season. His tenure finished when Ricardo Moniz was hired as the permanent head coach on 4 June 2014. Von Ahlen once again became head coach of the first team after Moniz was sacked. He was sacked on 17 February 2015. In July 2016 he became manager of the Under-19 squad of Bayer Leverkusen. In January 2022 he became new manager of Bonner SC. On 3 May 2022 he was sacked by Bonner only to be named new manager of Fortuna Köln one hour later.

== Coaching record ==
As of 19 July 2023

Team	From	To	Record					
Team	From	To	G	W	D	L	Win %	Ref.
Arminia Bielefeld	1 July 2011	20 September 2011	11	0	5	6	0.00	
1860 Munich II	20 December 2012	30 June 2013	17	14	2	1	82.35	
1860 Munich	6 April 2014	4 June 2014	5	3	1	1	60.00	
1860 Munich	24 September 2014	17 February 2015	15	3	3	9	20.00	
Bonner SC	3 January 2022	3 May 2022	15	5	5	5	33.33	
Fortuna Köln	3 May 2022	Present	34	15	9	10	44.12	
Total			97	40	25	32	41.24	—

== Honours ==
Bayer Leverkusen

- DFB-Pokal: 1992–93
