= Marlon Krause =

German footballer

Personal information
- Date of birth: 1 September 1990 (age 36)
- Place of birth: Halstenbek, Germany
- Height: 1.80 m (5 ft 11 in)
- Position: Centre-back

Youth career
- SV Halstenbek-Rellingen
- Blau-Weiß 96 Schenefeld
- –2007: SC Concordia Hamburg
- 2007–2008: FC St. Pauli

Senior career*
Years	Team	Apps	(Gls)
2008–2011	FC St. Pauli II	62	(4)
2011–2012	Carl Zeiss Jena	6	(0)
2012–2016	Holstein Kiel	71	(3)
2016–2017	Sonnenhof Großaspach	33	(1)
2017–2019	1. FC Saarbrücken	22	(1)
Total		194	(9)
- * Club domestic league appearances and goals

Marlon Krause (born 1 September 1990) is a German former professional footballer who plays as a centre-back.
