= 2012–13 SV Darmstadt 98 season =

SV Darmstadt 98
2012–13 season
- Chairman: Klaus Rüdiger Fritsch
- Manager: Dirk Schuster
- Stadium: Stadion am Böllenfalltor
- 3. Liga: 18th
- Top goalscorer: League: All: Preston Zimmerman (7)
- Highest home attendance: 10,300
- Lowest home attendance: 3,600
Home colours	Away colours

The 2012–13 SV Darmstadt 98 season is the 116th season in the club's football history. In 2012–13 the club played in the 3. Liga, the third tier of German football. It is the club's second season in this league, having been promoted from the Regionalliga in 2011.

== Squad ==
Note: Flags indicate national team as defined under FIFA eligibility rules; some limited exceptions apply. Players may hold more than one non-FIFA nationality.

No.	Pos.	Nation	Player
1	GK	GER	Jan Zimmermann
2	DF	GER	Julian Ratei
3	DF	GER	Michael Stegmayer
4	DF	TUR	Cem Islamoglu
5	DF	GER	Andreas Gaebler
6	DF	GER	Christian Beisel
7	FW	USA	Preston Zimmerman
8	MF	GER	Musa Karli
9	FW	GER	Marcus Steegmann
10	MF	BRA	Elton da Costa
11	MF	GER	Sebastian Zielinsky
13	FW	GER	Rudi Hübner
14	MF	GER	Uwe Hesse

No.	Pos.	Nation	Player
15	DF	GER	Benjamin Maas
17	MF	GER	Hanno Behrens
18	MF	GER	Danny Latza
19	MF	GER	Marc Schnier
20	FW	TUR	Uğur Albayrak
21	FW	POL	Kacper Tatara
22	GK	GER	Felix Martini
23	MF	GER	Benjamin Baier
25	DF	GER	Nikola Mladenovic
27	DF	GER	Benjamin Gorka
28	GK	GER	David Salfeld
61	FW	GER	Burak Bilgin

== Review and events ==
The club lost coach Kosta Runjaic on 3 September to second division side MSV Duisburg. Runjaic was replaced with Jürgen Seeberger two days later.

At mid-season, Darmstadt were sitting in dead last, 20th place, in the relegation zone.

At the end of the season, the club finished in 18th, which is in the first spot of the relegation zone of the 3. Liga. But due to the fact that Kickers Offenbach had their license revoked, Darmstadt was not relegated.

== Friendly matches ==
Win Draw Loss

SV Darmstadt 98	0–2	FSV Frankfurt
		Yannick Stark; Yun Ju-Tae

== Competitions ==
=== 3. Liga ===
==== League table ====
Pos	Team	Pld	W	D	L	GF	GA	GD	Pts	Promotion, qualification or relegation
16	Borussia Dortmund II (Note: Reserve teams are ineligible for promotion or DFB-Pokal qualification.)	38	9	14	15	39	58	−19	41	
17	Stuttgarter Kickers	38	10	10	18	39	48	−9	40	
18	SV Darmstadt 98	38	8	14	16	32	46	−14	38	
19	SV Babelsberg 03 (R)	38	9	10	19	32	54	−22	37	Relegation to Regionalliga
20	Alemannia Aachen (Note: Alemannia Aachen took voluntary relegation on 23 November 2012, due to financial insolvency. Later has five points deducted for using bond money from a DFB fund and not paying back in time.) (R)	38	7	10	21	40	68	−28	26	Relegation to Regionalliga

Source: kicker
Rules for classification: 1) points; 2) goal difference; 3) number of goals scored.
(R) Relegated

==== Results summary ====
Overall								Home						Away					
Pld	W	D	L	GF	GA	GD	Pts	W	D	L	GF	GA	GD	W	D	L	GF	GA	GD
38	8	13	17	35	47	−12	37	5	6	8	18	19	−1	3	7	9	17	28	−11

Last updated: 16 June 2015.
Source: Competitive matches

==== Matches ====
Win Draw Loss

21 July 2012 1	SV Darmstadt 98	0–0	SpVgg Unterhaching	Darmstadt
14:00		Report		Stadium: Stadion am Böllenfalltor; Attendance: 5,300; Referee: Robert Kempter (Sauldorf)

28 July 2012 2	SV Babelsberg 03	2–0	SV Darmstadt 98	Babelsberg
14:00	Berzel 33'; Koç 67'	Report		Stadium: Karl-Liebknecht-Stadion; Attendance: 2,754; Referee: Norbert Grudzinski (Hamburg)

3 August 2012 3	SV Darmstadt 98	2–1	SC Preußen Münster	Darmstadt
19:00	Hesse 18'; Gaebler 78'	Report	Bischoff 88'	Stadium: Stadion am Böllenfalltor; Attendance: 6,200; Referee: Sebastian Schmickartz (Berlin)

8 August 2012 4	Chemnitzer FC	3–1	SV Darmstadt 98	Chemnitz
19:00	Fink 35'; Landeka 38', 68'	Report	Behrens 89'	Stadium: Stadion an der Gellertstraße; Attendance: 5,200; Referee: Thorben Siewer (Drolshagen)

11 August 2012 5	SV Wacker Burghausen	1–0	SV Darmstadt 98	Burghausen
14:00	Thiel 35'	Report		Stadium: Wacker-Arena; Attendance: 2,410; Referee: Marcel Göpferich (Bretten-Bauerbach)

26 August 2012 6	SV Darmstadt 98	1–1	Hansa Rostock	Darmstadt
19:00	Tatara 22'	Report	Quaschner 67'	Stadium: Stadion am Böllenfalltor; Attendance: 8,600; Referee: Patrick Alt (Heusweiler)

29 August 2012 7	SV Wehen Wiesbaden	1–1	SV Darmstadt 98	Wiesbaden
14:00	Janjić 84'	Report	Gorka 37'	Stadium: BRITA-Arena; Attendance: 4,569; Referee: Benjamin Cortus (Röthenbach an der Pegnitz)

2 September 2012 8	SV Darmstadt 98	0–2	1. FC Heidenheim	Darmstadt
14:00		Report	Schnatterer 53'; Heidenfelder 63'	Stadium: Stadion am Böllenfalltor; Attendance: 4,800; Referee: Malte Dittrich (Bremen)

15 September 2012 9	Hallescher FC	2–2	SV Darmstadt 98	Halle
14:00	Teixeira-Rebelo 37'; Mast 41'	Report	Stegmayer 81'; Zimmerman 87'	Stadium: Erdgas Sportpark; Attendance: 7,022; Referee: Marco Fritz (Korb)

22 September 2012 10	SV Darmstadt 98	3–1	VfB Stuttgart II	Darmstadt
14:00	Hesse 16'; Gaebler 71' (pen.); Behrens 75'	Report	Rathgeb 51'; Heidenfelder 63'	Stadium: Stadion am Böllenfalltor; Attendance: 4,500; Referee: Florian Heft (Wietmarschen)

26 September 2012 11	VfL Osnabrück	1–0	SV Darmstadt 98	Osnabrück
14:00	Piossek 86'	Report		Stadium: Osnatel-Arena; Attendance: 7,700; Referee: Norbert Grudzinski (Hamburg)

29 September 2012 12	SV Darmstadt 98	1–3	Arminia Bielefeld	Darmstadt
14:00	Tatara 59'	Report	Burmeister 35' (pen.); Testroet 53'; Hille 78'	Stadium: Stadion am Böllenfalltor; Attendance: 5,100; Referee: Florian Steinberg (Korntal)

6 October 2012 13	Alemannia Aachen	1–1	SV Darmstadt 98	Aachen
14:00	Pozder 61'	Report	Tatara 76'	Stadium: New Tivoli; Attendance: 13,003; Referee: Sören Storks (Ramsdorf)

20 October 2012 14	SV Darmstadt 98	1–2	Borussia Dortmund II	Darmstadt
14:00	Gaebler 13' (pen.)	Report	Bajner 54'; Baykan 89'	Stadium: Stadion am Böllenfalltor; Attendance: 4,500; Referee: Thomas Stein (Homburg am Main)

27 October 2012 15	1. FC Saarbrücken	3–1	SV Darmstadt 98	Saarbrücken
14:00	Eggert 17'; Ziemer 32'; Laux 58' (pen.)	Report	Latza 33'	Stadium: Ludwigsparkstadion; Attendance: 3,452; Referee: Eduard Beitinger (Regensburg)

3 November 2012 16	SV Darmstadt 98	1–0	Kickers Offenbach	Darmstadt
14:00	Behrens 45'	Report		Stadium: Stadion am Böllenfalltor; Attendance: 9,600; Referee: Peter Sippel (Munich)

10 November 2012 17	Karlsruher SC	2–0	SV Darmstadt 98	Karlsruhe
14:00	Hennings 73'; Latza 75' (o.g.)	Report		Stadium: Wildparkstadion; Attendance: 10,219; Referee: Robert Kempter (Sauldorf)

18 November 2012 18	SV Darmstadt 98	0–1	Rot-Weiß Erfurt	Darmstadt
14:00		Report	Drexler 64'	Stadium: Stadion am Böllenfalltor; Attendance: 4,700; Referee: Lothar Ostheimer (Pfaffenhofen an der Ilm)

24 November 2012 19	Stuttgarter Kickers	1–1	SV Darmstadt 98	Stuttgart
14:00	Grüttner 90'	Report	Latza 75'	Stadium: Waldau-Stadion; Attendance: 3,500; Referee: Markus Wingenbach (Diez)

30 November 2012 20	SpVgg Unterhaching	2–2	SV Darmstadt 98	Unterhaching
19:00	Niederlechner 77' (pen.), 90+2'	Report	Zimmerman 1', 78'	Stadium: Generali Sportpark; Attendance: 1,400; Referee: Tim Sönder (Kiel)

15 December 2012 22	SC Preußen Münster	3–0	SV Darmstadt 98	Münster
14:00	Königs 41', 72', 74'	Report		Stadium: Preußenstadion; Attendance: 6,102; Referee: Bastian Dankert (Rostock)

2 February 2013 24	SV Darmstadt 98	0–0	SV Wacker Burghausen	Darmstadt
14:00		Report		Stadium: Stadion am Böllenfalltor; Attendance: 4,100; Referee: Arno Blos (Deizisau)

13 February 2013 21	SV Darmstadt 98	0–0	SV Babelsberg 03	Darmstadt
19:00		Report		Stadium: Stadion am Böllenfalltor; Attendance: 3,600; Referee: Martin Thomsen (Kleve)

17 February 2013 26	SV Darmstadt 98	1–0	SV Wehen Wiesbaden	Darmstadt
14:00	da Costa 61'	Report		Stadium: Stadion am Böllenfalltor; Attendance: 3,800; Referee: Christian Fischer (Hemer)

23 February 2013 27	1. FC Heidenheim	3–0	SV Darmstadt 98	Heidenheim
14:00	Kraus 6'; Titsch-Rivero 72'; Krebs 85'	Report		Stadium: Voith-Arena; Attendance: 6,000; Referee: Benjamin Cortus (Röthenbach an der Pegnitz)

3 March 2013 28	SV Darmstadt 98	1–2	Hallescher FC	Darmstadt
14:00	Sulu 12'	Report	Furuholm 59'; Mast 90+2'	Stadium: Stadion am Böllenfalltor; Attendance: 4,700; Referee: Thorsten Schriever (Dorum)

9 March 2013 29	VfB Stuttgart II	0–3	SV Darmstadt 98	Stuttgart
14:00		Report	Zimmerman 32'; Latza 72'	Stadium: Waldau-Stadion; Attendance: 610; Referee: Florian Heft (Wietmarschen)

16 March 2013 30	SV Darmstadt 98	1–0	VfL Osnabrück	Darmstadt
14:00	Zimmerman 55'	Report		Stadium: Stadion am Böllenfalltor; Attendance: 4,800; Referee: Günter Perl (Pullach)

23 March 2013 25	Hansa Rostock	0–0	SV Darmstadt 98	Rostock
14:00		Report		Stadium: DKB-Arena; Attendance: 7,300; Referee: Timo Gerach (Landau)

30 March 2013 31	Arminia Bielefeld	0–0	SV Darmstadt 98	Bielefeld
14:00		Report		Stadium: Schüco-Arena; Attendance: 10,081; Referee: Thomas Stein (Homburg am Main)

5 April 2013 32	SV Darmstadt 98	0–0	Alemannia Aachen	Darmstadt
19:00		Report		Stadium: Stadion am Böllenfalltor; Attendance: 5,800; Referee: Robert Kampka (Mainz)

13 April 2013 33	Borussia Dortmund II	1–0	SV Darmstadt 98	Dortmund
14:00	Bajner 57'	Report		Stadium: Stadion Rote Erde; Attendance: 1,108; Referee: Florian Steinberg (Korntal)

17 April 2013 23	SV Darmstadt 98	1–1	Chemnitzer FC	Darmstadt
19:00	Latza 3'	Report	Förster 35'	Stadium: Stadion am Böllenfalltor; Attendance: 4,300; Referee: Christian Leicher (Landshut)

20 April 2013 34	SV Darmstadt 98	1–2	1. FC Saarbrücken	Darmstadt
14:00	Steegmann 89'	Report	Sökler 49'; Ziemer 63'	Stadium: Stadion am Böllenfalltor; Attendance: 5,100; Referee: Malte Dittrich (Bremen)

26 April 2013 35	Kickers Offenbach	0–2	SV Darmstadt 98	Offenbach am Main
19:00		Report	Zimmerman 36'; Steegmann 82'	Stadium: Sparda Bank Hessen Stadium; Attendance: 9,433; Referee: Peter Gagelmann (Bremen)

5 May 2013 36	SV Darmstadt 98	0–1	Karlsruher SC	Darmstadt
14:00		Report	Çalhanoğlu 89'	Stadium: Stadion am Böllenfalltor; Attendance: 10,300; Referee: Felix Brych (Munich)

11 May 2013 37	Rot-Weiß Erfurt	2–4	SV Darmstadt 98	Erfurt
13:30	Öztürk 27'; Tunjic 29'	Report	Zimmerman 5'; Steegmann 12', 58', 87' (pen.)	Stadium: Steigerwaldstadion; Attendance: 5846; Referee: Martin Petersen (Stuttgart)

18 May 2013 38	SV Darmstadt 98	1–1	Stuttgarter Kickers	Darmstadt
13:30	da Costa 84'	Report	Dicklhuber 11'	Stadium: Stadion am Böllenfalltor; Attendance: 13,600; Referee: Günter Perl (Pullach)
