= 2011–12 SV Wehen Wiesbaden season =

SV Wehen Wiesbaden
2011–12 season
- Chairman: Markus Hankammer
- Manager: Peter Vollmann
- 3. Fußball-Liga: 16th
- DFB-Pokal: Round 1
- Top goalscorer: League: Steffen Wohlfarth & Zlatko Janjic (9); All: Zlatko Janjic (10)
- Highest home attendance: 11,600 vs. VfB Stuttgart, 29 July 2011
- Lowest home attendance: 1976 vs. Arminia Bielefeld, 11 February 2012
Home colours	Away colours

The 2011–12 season of SV Wehen Wiesbaden began on 18 June with their first friendly match.

Wehen Wiesbaden finished 16th in the league table.

== Review and events ==
=== Off-season ===
Wehen signed this year's captain Marco Christ from Fortuna Düsseldorf, as well as signing Nico Herzig and Thorsten Burkhardt from Alemannia Aachen, Aziz Bouhaddouz from FSV Frankfurt, Martin Abraham from SK Slavia Prague, Pascal Bieler from 1. FC Nürnberg all for free, and Daniel Brosinski from 1. FC Köln.

They sold last year's captain, Fabian Schönheim to 1. FSV Mainz 05 for €400K, and Daniel Brosinski (who they had signed in the same transfer window) to MSV Duisburg for €150K

== Matches ==
=== 3. Liga ===
The 2011–12 3. Liga began on 23 July when Wiesbaden played in the opening game of the season at home against SV Werder Bremen II.

==== Matches ====
23 July 2011 1	SV Wehen Wiesbaden	2–1	SV Werder Bremen II	Wiesbaden
14:00 CET	Wohlfarth 60', 63'		Hahn 40'	Stadium: BRITA-Arena; Attendance: 3511; Referee: R.Kampka

2 August 2011 2	VfB Stuttgart II	0–0	SV Wehen Wiesbaden	Stuttgart
19:00 CET				Stadium: GAZi-Stadion auf der Waldau; Attendance: 820; Referee: T.Gerach

6 August 2011 3	SV Wehen Wiesbaden	2–1	VfL Osnabrück	Wiesbaden
14:00 CET	Christ 10' (pen.); Bouhaddouz 35'		Mauersberger 39'	Stadium: BRITA-Arena; Attendance: 3599; Referee: K.Kircher

13 August 2011 4	VfR Aalen	2–0	SV Wehen Wiesbaden	Aalen
14:00 CET	Lechleiter 5', 15'			Stadium: Scholz Arena; Attendance: 3128; Referee: S.Jablonski

16 August 2011 5	SV Wehen Wiesbaden	0–1	SV Darmstadt 98	Wiesbaden
19:00 CET			Latza 38'	Stadium: BRITA-Arena; Attendance: 5201; Referee: M.Fritz

20 August 2011 6	Arminia Bielefeld	0–1	SV Wehen Wiesbaden	Bielefeld
14:00 CET			Ole Book 77'	Stadium: SchücoArena; Attendance: 6405; Referee: B.Rafati

27 August 2011 7	SV Sandhausen	0–0	SV Wehen Wiesbaden	Sandhausen
14:00 CET				Stadium: Hardtwaldstadion; Attendance: 1600; Referee: M.Thomsen

10 September 2011 8	SV Wehen Wiesbaden	1–2	SSV Jahn Regensburg	Wiesbaden
14:00 CET	Janjić 19'		Hein 59'; Neunaber 65'	Stadium: BRITA-Arena; Attendance: 3001; Referee: T.Metzen

13 September 2011 9	FC Rot-Weiß Erfurt	2–2	SV Wehen Wiesbaden	Erfurt
18:30 CET	Caillas 10'; Morabit 51'		Janjić 16'; Wohlfarth 51'	Stadium: Steigerwaldstadion; Attendance: 4780; Referee: J.Seidel

16 September 2011 10	SV Wehen Wiesbaden	0–0	SV Wacker Burghausen	Wiesbaden
19:00 CET				Stadium: BRITA-Arena; Attendance: 5321; Referee: A.Aarnink

24 September 2011 11	1.FC Saarbrücken	1–2	SV Wehen Wiesbaden	Saarbrücken
14:00 CET	Ziemer 23'; Laux 31'		Janjić 24'	Stadium: Stadion Ludwigspark; Attendance: 7403; Referee: S.Stegemann

1 October 2011 12	SV Wehen Wiesbaden	3–0	SC Preußen Münster	Wiesbaden
14:00 CET	Ole Book 14'; Duah 30' (o.g.); Wohlfarth 39'			Stadium: BRITA-Arena; Attendance: 3396; Referee: E.Beitinger

15 October 2011 13	1. FC Heidenheim	1–1	SV Wehen Wiesbaden	Heidenheim an der Brenz
14:00 CET	Frommer 45+2'		Lanzaat 12'	Stadium: Voith-Arena; Attendance: 6000; Referee: C.Dingert

21 October 2011 14	SV Wehen Wiesbaden	3–1	Kickers Offenbach	Wiesbaden
19:00 CET	Herzig 68'; Bouhaddouz 73'; Salem 90'		Hesse 42'	Stadium: BRITA-Arena; Attendance: 7526; Referee: Deniz Aytekin

29 October 2011 15	SpVgg Unterhaching	5–1	SV Wehen Wiesbaden	Unterhaching
14:00 CET	Krontiris 13'; Sternisko 28'; Avdic 31', 74'; Niederlechner 32'		Bouhaddouz 41'	Stadium: Generali Sportpark; Attendance: 1450; Referee: Harm Osmers

5 November 2011 16	SV Wehen Wiesbaden	2–0	Chemnitzer FC	Wiesbaden
14:00 CET	Wohlfarth 51'; Burkhardt 90+2'			Stadium: BRITA-Arena; Attendance: 3534; Referee: Patrick Alt

19 November 2011 17	Rot-Weiß Oberhausen	2–1	SV Wehen Wiesbaden	Oberhausen
14:00 CET	Pappas 12'; Abel 59'		Salem 47'	Stadium: Niederrheinstadion; Attendance: 2711; Referee: Sven Jablonski

26 November 2011 18	SV Wehen Wiesbaden	0–0	FC Carl Zeiss Jena	Wiesbaden
14:00 CET				Stadium: BRITA-Arena; Attendance: 3112; Referee: Malte Dittrich

3 December 2011 19	SV Babelsberg 03	3–2	SV Wehen Wiesbaden	Babelsberg
14:00 CET	Stroh-Engel 17'; Müller 20', 69'		Wohlfarth 15', 32'	Stadium: Karl-Liebknecht-Stadion; Attendance: 1470; Referee: Eduard Beitlinger

21 December 2011 20	SV Wehen Wiesbaden	1–1	VfB Stuttgart II	Wiesbaden
14:00 CET	Hübner 84'		Vier 60'	Stadium: BRITA-Arena; Attendance: 2393; Referee: Thorben Siewer

17 December 2011 21	SV Werder Bremen II	1–1	SV Wehen Wiesbaden	Bremen
14:00 CET	Füllkrug 57'		Janjić 48'	Stadium: Weserstadion, Platz 11; Attendance: 397; Referee: Timo Gerach

14 February 2012 22	VfL Osnabrück	2–0	SV Wehen Wiesbaden	Osnabrück
14:00 CET	Mauersberger 16'; Glocker 69'			Stadium: Osnatel-Arena; Attendance: 7300; Referee: Martin Peterson

28 January 2011 23	SV Wehen Wiesbaden	1–3	VfR Aalen	Wiesbaden
14:00 CET	Bouhaddouz 13'		Lechleiter 22', 61', 79'	Stadium: BRITA-Arena; Attendance: 2449; Referee: Thorsten Schrievers

4 February 2011 24	SV Darmstadt 98	0–1	SV Wehen Wiesbaden	Darmstadt
14:00 CET			Wohlfarth 31'	Stadium: Stadion am Böllenfalltor; Attendance: 4000; Referee: Robert Hartmann

11 February 2011 25	SV Wehen Wiesbaden	0–0	Arminia Bielefeld	Wiesbaden
14:00 CET				Stadium: BRITA-Arena; Attendance: 1976; Referee: Marcel Göpferich

18 February 2011 26	SV Wehen Wiesbaden	0–4	SV Sandhausen	Wiesbaden
14:00 CET			Löning 7', 45', 54'; Busch 36'	Stadium: BRITA-Arena; Attendance: 2353; Referee: Benjamin Cortus

25 February 2011 27	SSV Jahn Regensburg	2–1	SV Wehen Wiesbaden	Regensburg
14:00 CET	Kurz 11', 24'		Bieler 15'	Stadium: Jahnstadion; Attendance: 3012; Referee: Sebastian Schmickartz

3 March 2011 28	SV Wehen Wiesbaden	0–1	FC Rot-Weiß Erfurt	Wiesbaden
14:00 CET			Engelhardt 26'	Stadium: BRITA-Arena; Attendance: 2509; Referee: Tim Sönder

10 March 2011 29	Wacker Burghausen	2–2	SV Wehen Wiesbaden	Burghausen
14:00 CET	Thiel 68'; Mokhtari 76'		Janjic 38', 81'	Stadium: Wacker Arena; Attendance: 2500; Referee: Arno Blos

17 March 2011 30	SV Wehen Wiesbaden	3–2	1. FC Saarbrücken	Wiesbaden
14:00 CET	Janjic 25', 65'; Wohlfarth 37'		Laux 24'; Eggert 64'	Stadium: BRITA-Arena; Attendance: 3498; Referee: Sven Jablonski

24 March 2011 31	Preußen Münster	1–1	SV Wehen Wiesbaden	Münster
14:00 CET	Kühne 9'		Janjic 44'	Stadium: Preußen-Stadion; Attendance: 5187; Referee: Patrick Alt

31 March 2011 32	SV Wehen Wiesbaden	1–2	1. FC Heidenheim	Wiesbaden
14:00 CET	Hübner 80'		Sailer 58'; Malura 89'	Stadium: BRITA-Arena; Attendance: 3088; Referee: Sascha Stegemann

7 April 2011 33	Kickers Offenbach	0–2	SV Wehen Wiesbaden	Offenbach
14:00 CET			Mintzel 61'; Wohlfarth 63'	Stadium: Stadion am Bieberer Berg

11 April 2011 34	SV Wehen Wiesbaden	v	SpVgg Unterhaching	Wiesbaden
19:00 CET				Stadium: BRITA-Arena

14 April 2011 35	Chemnitzer FC	v	SV Wehen Wiesbaden	Chemnitz
14:00 CET				Stadium: Stadion an der Gellertstraße

21 April 2011 36	SV Wehen Wiesbaden	v	Rot-Weiß Oberhausen	Wiesbaden
14:00 CET				Stadium: BRITA-Arena

28 April 2011 37	FC Carl Zeiss Jena	v	SV Wehen Wiesbaden	Jena
13:30 CET				Stadium: Ernst-Abbe-Sportfeld

5 May 2011 38	SV Wehen Wiesbaden	v	SV Babelsberg 03	Wiesbaden
13:30 CET				Stadium: BRITA-Arena

== Squad information ==
Squad Season 2011–12
No.	Player	Nat.	Birthdate	at SWW since	previous club
Goalkeepers
1	Michael Gurski	(Germany)	21 Mar 1979	2010	SV Sandhausen
21	Stefan Marinovic	(New Zealand)	7 Oct 1991	2009	Waitakere City
25	Markus Kolke	(Germany)	18 Aug 1990	2011	SV Waldhof Mannheim
Defenders
2	Nico Herzig	(Germany)	10 Dec 1983	2011	Alemannia Aachen
3	Thorsten Barg	(Germany)	25 Aug 1986	2008	Karlsruher SC
4	Quido Lanzaat	(Netherlands)	30 Sep 1979	2010	FC Carl Zeiss Jena
5	Nikolas Ledgerwood	(Canada)	16 Jan 1985	2010	FSV Frankfurt
6	Benjamin Hübner	(Germany)	4 Jul 1989	1993	—
8	Marcus Mann	(Germany)	14 Mar 1984	2011	1. FC Saarbrücken
16	Daniel Döringer	(Germany)	26 Feb 1991	2011	—
19	Timo Nagy	(Germany)	20 Apr 1983	2011	FC Carl Zeiss Jena
22	Pascal Bieler	(Germany)	26 Feb 1986	2011	1. FC Nürnberg
27	Sven Schimmel	(Germany)	30 Jul 1989	2011	VfB Stuttgart II
Midfielders
7	Marco Christ	(Germany)	6 Nov 1980	2011	Fortuna Düsseldorf
11	Nicolas Roth	(Germany)	28 Aug 1990	2011	SV 73 Süd Nürnberg
15	Zlatko Janjić	(Bosnia and Herzegovina)	7 May 1986	2010	Arminia Bielefeld
20	Milad Salem	(Afghanistan)	3 Mar 1988	2010	1. FC Germania 08 Ober-Roden
23	Alf Mintzel	(Germany)	21 Dec 1981	2010	SV Sandhausen
24	Thorsten Burkhardt	(Germany)	21 May 1981	2011	Alemannia Aachen
26	Martin Abraham	(Czech Republic)	20 Sep 1978	2010*	SK Slavia Prague
31	Nils-Ole Book	(Germany)	17 Feb 1986	2011	Rot Weiss Ahlen
Forwards
10	Orlando Smeekes	(Curaçao)	28 Dec 1981	2011	FC Carl Zeiss Jena
9	Aziz Bouhaddouz	(Morocco)	30 Mar 1987	2011	FSV Frankfurt
13	Addy-Waku Menga	(Democratic Republic of the Congo)	28 Sep 1983	2010	SV Werder Bremen
14	Steffen Wohlfarth	(Germany)	14 Sep 1983	2011	FC Bayern Munich II
17	Panagiotis Triadis	(Greece)	9 Sep 1992	2011	Eintracht Frankfurt
18	Marco Sailer	(Germany)	16 Nov 1985	2010	SpVgg Greuther Fürth
34	Milan Ivana	(Czech Republic)	26 Nov 1983	2012	Slovan Bratislava
33	Jonne Hjelm	(Finland)	14 Jan 1988	2012	Tampere United
Last updated: 26 March 2012*Martin Abraham joined FC Bohemians 1905

=== Goal scorers ===
All competitions

Scorer	Goals
(Bosnia and Herzegovina) Zlatko Janjić	10
(Germany) Steffen Wohlfarth	9
(Morocco) Aziz Bouhaddouz	4
(Germany) Nils-Ole Book	2
(Germany) Thorsten Burkhardt	2
(Afghanistan) Milad Salem	2
(Germany) Marco Christ	1
(Netherlands) Quido Lanzaat	1
(Germany) Nico Herzig	1
(Germany) Benjamin Hübner	1
(Germany) Pascal Bieler	1

2011–12 3rd Liga

Scorer	Goals
(Germany) Steffen Wohlfarth	9
(Bosnia and Herzegovina) Zlatko Janjić	9
(Morocco) Aziz Bouhaddouz	4
(Germany) Nils-Ole Book	2
(Afghanistan) Milad Salem	2
(Germany) Thorsten Burkhardt	2
(Germany) Marco Christ	1
(Netherlands) Quido Lanzaat	1
(Germany) Nico Herzig	1
(Germany) Benjamin Hübner	1
(Germany) Pascal Bieler	1

DFB-Pokal

Scorer	Goals
(Bosnia and Herzegovina) Zlatko Janjić	1

Last updated: 26 March 2012

== Reserve team ==
Wehen Wiesbaden's reserve team play in the fifth tier Hessenliga and are coached by Thomas Brendel.

=== Squad ===
Note: Flags indicate national team as defined under FIFA eligibility rules; some limited exceptions apply. Players may hold more than one non-FIFA nationality.

No.	Pos.	Nation	Player
—	GK	ITA	Nico Adami
—	GK	TUR	Can Yüksel
—	GK	ROU	Alexander Loch
—	DF	ENG	George Worcester
—	DF	GER	Robin Böcher
—	DF	GER	Timo Becker
—	DF	GER	Dominik Lötschert
—	DF	GER	Hannes Schmitz
—	DF	PHI	Patrick Herget
—	MF	GER	Boris Kolb

No.	Pos.	Nation	Player
—	MF	GER	Dennis Hornung
—	MF	TUR	Balcan Sari
—	MF	KAZ	Eugen Schiffmann
—	MF	GER	Thimo Langner
—	MF	GER	David Schug
—	FW	ROU	Andreas Loch
—	FW	GER	Maximillian Meuth
—	FW	GER	Sebastian Gurok
