= 2013–14 2. Bundesliga =

40th season of the second-tier football league in Germany

2. Bundesliga
- Season: 2013–14
- Champions: 1. FC Köln
- Promoted: 1. FC Köln; SC Paderborn
- Relegated: Energie Cottbus; Dynamo Dresden; Arminia Bielefeld (via play-off)
- Matches: 306
- Goals: 787 (2.57 per match)
- Top goalscorer: Mahir Sağlık; Jakub Sylvestr (15 goals)
- Average attendance: 17,888

The 2013–14 2. Bundesliga was the 40th season of the 2. Bundesliga, Germany's second-level football league. The league was won by 1. FC Köln.

== Teams ==
Location of teams in the 2013–14 2. Bundesliga

=== Promotions and relegations ===
Teams promoted from the 2. Bundesliga to the Bundesliga directly

- Hertha BSC
- Eintracht Braunschweig

Teams relegated from the 2012–13 Bundesliga directly

- Fortuna Düsseldorf
- SpVgg Greuther Fürth

Teams relegated to the 3. Liga directly

- ~~SV Sandhausen~~ MSV Duisburg
- Jahn Regensburg

Teams promoted from the 2012–13 3. Liga to the 2. Bundesliga directly

- Karlsruher SC
- Arminia Bielefeld

Playoff winners

- Third placed 2. Bundesliga side 1. FC Kaiserslautern were defeated by 16th placed Bundesliga side 1899 Hoffenheim in the course of the Bundesliga promotion-relegation play-offs and thus remain in the 2. Bundesliga.
- 16th placed 2. Bundesliga side Dynamo Dresden defeated third placed 3. Liga side VfL Osnabrück in the course of the 2. Bundesliga promotion-relegation play-offs and thus remain in the 2. Bundesliga.

On 29 May 2013, the German Football League (DFL) announced that MSV Duisburg would not get a license for the 2013–14 season as the club could not prove their financial capability. Duisburg were relegated and SV Sandhausen were reinstated in their place.

=== Stadiums and locations ===
Team	Location	Stadium	Stadium capacity
VfR Aalen	Aalen	Scholz-Arena	13,251
Arminia Bielefeld	Bielefeld	Schüco-Arena	27,300
VfL Bochum	Bochum	rewirpowerSTADION	29,299
Dynamo Dresden	Dresden	Glücksgas-Stadion	32,066
Energie Cottbus	Cottbus	Stadion der Freundschaft	22,528
FC Erzgebirge Aue	Aue	Sparkassen-Erzgebirgsstadion	15,711
Fortuna Düsseldorf	Düsseldorf	Esprit Arena	54,600
FSV Frankfurt	Frankfurt am Main	Frankfurter Volksbank Stadion	12,542
SpVgg Greuther Fürth	Fürth	Trolli Arena	18,000
FC Ingolstadt 04	Ingolstadt	Audi Sportpark	15,445
1. FC Kaiserslautern	Kaiserslautern	Fritz-Walter-Stadion	49,780
Karlsruher SC	Karlsruhe	Wildparkstadion	29,699
1. FC Köln	Cologne	RheinEnergieStadion	50,000
1860 Munich	Munich	Allianz Arena	71,000
SC Paderborn 07	Paderborn	Energieteam Arena	15,000
SV Sandhausen	Sandhausen	Hardtwald	12,100
FC St. Pauli	Hamburg	Millerntor-Stadion	29,063
1. FC Union Berlin	Berlin	Alte Försterei	21,704

=== Personnel and sponsorships ===
Team	Head coach	Team captain	Kitmaker	Shirt sponsor
VfR Aalen	(Germany) Stefan Ruthenbeck	(Argentina) Leandro Grech	Adidas	Prowin
Arminia Bielefeld	(Germany) Norbert Meier	(Germany) Thomas Hübener	Saller	getgoods.de
VfL Bochum	(Germany) Peter Neururer	(Germany) Andreas Luthe	Nike	Booster Energy Drink (H) / Netto (A)
Dynamo Dresden	(Germany) Olaf Janßen	(France) Romain Brégerie	Nike	Veolia
Energie Cottbus	(Germany) René Rydlewicz	(Germany) Marc-André Kruska	Saller	Tropical Islands
Erzgebirge Aue	(Germany) Falko Götz	(Germany) René Klingbeil	Nike	Eibenstock Elektrowerkzeuge
Fortuna Düsseldorf	(Germany) Lorenz-Günther Köstner	(Germany) Andreas Lambertz	Puma	o.tel.o
FSV Frankfurt	(Germany) Benno Möhlmann	(Germany) Björn Schlicke	Saller	Sparhandy
SpVgg Greuther Fürth	(Germany) Frank Kramer	(Albania) Mërgim Mavraj	Hummel	Ergo Direkt Versicherungen
FC Ingolstadt 04	(Austria) Ralph Hasenhüttl	(Cameroon) Marvin Matip	Adidas	Audi
1. FC Kaiserslautern	(Germany) Kosta Runjaić	(Switzerland) Albert Bunjaku	Uhlsport	Allgäuer Latschenkiefer
Karlsruher SC	(Germany) Markus Kauczinski	(Germany) Dirk Orlishausen	Hummel	Klaiber Markisen
1. FC Köln	(Austria) Peter Stöger	(Slovenia) Mišo Brečko	Erima	REWE
1860 Munich	(Germany) Markus von Ahlen	(Spain) Guillermo Vallori	Uhlsport	Think Blue
SC Paderborn 07	(Germany) André Breitenreiter	(Germany) Markus Krösche	Saller	kfzteile24
SV Sandhausen	(Germany) Alois Schwartz	(Germany) Frank Löning	Puma	Verivox
FC St. Pauli	(Germany) Roland Vrabec	(Germany) Fabian Boll	Do You Football	Relentless Energy Drink
1. FC Union Berlin	(Germany) Uwe Neuhaus	(Germany) Torsten Mattuschka	Uhlsport	Becker AutoSound

=== Managerial changes ===
Team	Outgoing manager	Manner of departure	Date of vacancy	Position in table	Incoming manager	Date of appointment
1. FC Köln	(Germany) Holger Stanislawski	Resigned	19 May 2013	Pre-season	(Austria) Peter Stöger	12 June 2013
Fortuna Düsseldorf	(Germany) Norbert Meier	Sacked	24 May 2013	Pre-season	(Germany) Mike Büskens	3 June 2013
SV Sandhausen	(Germany) Hans-Jürgen Boysen	Resigned	31 May 2013	Pre-season	(Germany) Alois Schwartz	1 June 2013
VfR Aalen	(Austria) Ralph Hasenhüttl	Resigned	1 June 2013	Pre-season	(Germany) Stefan Ruthenbeck	14 June 2013
FC Ingolstadt 04	(Germany) Tomas Oral	Mutual consent	30 June 2013	Pre-season	(Germany) Marco Kurz	1 July 2013
SC Paderborn 07	(Germany) René Müller	End of tenure as caretaker	30 June 2013	Pre-season	(Germany) André Breitenreiter	1 July 2013
Dynamo Dresden	(Austria) Peter Pacult	Sacked	18 August 2013	17th	(Germany) Olaf Janßen	4 September 2013
1. FC Kaiserslautern	(Germany) Franco Foda	Sacked	29 August 2013	8th	(Germany) Kosta Runjaić	16 September 2013
1860 Munich	(Germany) Alexander Schmidt	Sacked	31 August 2013	7th	(Germany) Friedhelm Funkel	7 September 2013
FC Ingolstadt 04	(Germany) Marco Kurz	Sacked	30 September 2013	18th	(Austria) Ralph Hasenhüttl	4 October 2013
Energie Cottbus	(Germany) Rudi Bommer	Sacked	5 November 2013	17th	(Germany) Stephan Schmidt	6 November 2013
FC St. Pauli	(Germany) Michael Frontzeck	Sacked	6 November 2013	8th	(Germany) Roland Vrabec	7 November 2013
Fortuna Düsseldorf	(Germany) Mike Büskens	Sacked	30 November 2013	15th	(Germany) Lorenz-Günther Köstner	1 January 2014
Arminia Bielefeld	(Germany) Stefan Krämer	Sacked	23 February 2014	16th	(Germany) Norbert Meier	24 February 2014
Energie Cottbus	(Germany) Stephan Schmidt	Sacked	24 February 2014	18th	(Germany) Jörg Böhme (caretaker)	25 February 2014
1860 Munich	(Germany) Friedhelm Funkel	Sacked	6 April 2014	9th	(Germany) Markus von Ahlen (caretaker)	6 April 2014
Energie Cottbus	(Germany) Jörg Böhme	Sacked	7 May 2014	18th	(Germany) René Rydlewicz (caretaker)	7 May 2014

== League table ==
Pos	Team	Pld	W	D	L	GF	GA	GD	Pts	Promotion, qualification or relegation
1	1. FC Köln (C, P)	34	19	11	4	53	20	+33	68	Promotion to Bundesliga
2	SC Paderborn (P)	34	18	8	8	63	48	+15	62	Promotion to Bundesliga
3	Greuther Fürth	34	17	9	8	64	38	+26	60	Qualification for promotion play-offs
4	1. FC Kaiserslautern	34	15	9	10	55	39	+16	54	
5	Karlsruher SC	34	12	14	8	47	34	+13	50	
6	Fortuna Düsseldorf	34	13	11	10	45	44	+1	50	
7	1860 Munich	34	13	9	12	38	41	−3	48	
8	FC St. Pauli	34	13	9	12	44	49	−5	48	
9	Union Berlin	34	11	11	12	48	47	+1	44	
10	FC Ingolstadt	34	11	11	12	34	33	+1	44	
11	VfR Aalen	34	11	11	12	36	39	−3	44	
12	SV Sandhausen	34	12	8	14	29	35	−6	44	
13	FSV Frankfurt	34	11	8	15	46	51	−5	41	
14	Erzgebirge Aue	34	11	8	15	42	54	−12	41	
15	VfL Bochum	34	11	7	16	30	43	−13	40	
16	Arminia Bielefeld (R)	34	9	8	17	40	58	−18	35	Qualification for relegation play-offs
17	Dynamo Dresden (R)	34	5	17	12	36	53	−17	32	Relegation to 3. Liga
18	Energie Cottbus (R)	34	6	7	21	35	59	−24	25	Relegation to 3. Liga

Source: kicker.de
Rules for classification: 1) points; 2) goal difference; 3) number of goals scored.
(C) Champions; (P) Promoted; (R) Relegated

== Results ==
Home \ Away	AAL	AUE	UNB	DSC	BOC	FCE	SGD	F95	FSV	SGF	FCI	FCK	KSC	KOE	M60	SCP	SVS	STP
VfR Aalen	—	2–2	3–0	3–0	0–2	2–2	1–1	1–0	2–1	0–2	0–0	4–0	1–0	0–1	0–0	2–4	0–0	0–1
Erzgebirge Aue	0–1	—	3–2	0–2	2–1	2–1	2–0	3–0	2–1	2–6	0–0	1–0	3–0	2–2	2–2	0–2	1–0	0–2
Union Berlin	1–3	1–0	—	4–2	1–2	2–0	0–0	2–1	2–0	2–4	1–1	1–1	0–0	1–2	1–1	1–1	3–0	3–2
Arminia Bielefeld	0–0	1–0	1–1	—	0–2	1–3	1–1	4–2	0–0	4–1	0–2	0–3	0–0	0–1	0–1	3–3	2–1	2–2
VfL Bochum	1–2	1–0	0–4	1–4	—	2–1	1–1	0–0	1–2	0–2	0–1	0–0	1–0	1–0	1–2	4–2	0–1	2–2
Energie Cottbus	5–1	2–3	0–0	4–2	0–1	—	0–0	1–3	1–4	0–6	1–2	1–0	1–0	0–4	1–2	4–0	0–1	1–1
Dynamo Dresden	2–0	1–1	1–3	2–3	0–0	1–0	—	1–1	0–3	1–1	1–1	3–2	2–2	1–1	4–2	2–2	0–0	1–2
Fortuna Düsseldorf	3–1	4–0	1–1	2–0	1–0	1–0	1–1	—	0–0	2–1	0–0	4–2	0–2	2–3	1–2	1–6	1–0	0–2
FSV Frankfurt	0–0	3–1	1–1	1–2	1–0	3–1	3–2	0–0	—	1–1	4–1	0–4	0–1	2–0	2–2	1–3	0–3	1–0
Greuther Fürth	1–0	2–1	1–1	2–0	0–2	1–0	4–0	4–1	3–2	—	0–1	2–1	1–1	0–0	1–2	3–0	2–0	2–4
FC Ingolstadt	2–0	1–2	0–1	3–2	3–0	2–0	1–1	1–2	0–1	0–0	—	1–2	0–2	1–1	2–0	1–2	0–2	1–2
1. FC Kaiserslautern	1–2	2–1	3–0	1–1	1–1	2–2	4–0	0–1	3–2	2–1	3–1	—	2–2	0–0	3–0	0–1	2–1	4–1
Karlsruher SC	1–1	1–1	3–2	3–1	0–0	2–0	3–0	2–2	3–3	1–2	1–1	2–2	—	1–2	2–1	4–0	2–1	0–0
1. FC Köln	0–0	4–1	4–0	2–0	3–1	2–1	3–1	1–1	2–0	1–1	0–1	0–0	2–0	—	0–0	0–1	2–0	4–0
1860 Munich	4–0	3–1	2–1	2–1	2–0	0–0	1–3	1–1	2–1	1–0	1–0	0–1	0–3	0–1	—	2–2	0–2	0–2
SC Paderborn	2–1	1–1	0–3	4–0	4–1	1–0	2–1	1–2	4–2	2–2	1–1	0–1	1–0	1–1	1–0	—	2–0	3–0
SV Sandhausen	0–0	1–0	2–1	1–0	1–0	2–2	0–0	0–3	2–0	1–3	0–2	1–0	1–1	0–1	0–0	3–2	—	2–3
FC St. Pauli	0–3	2–2	2–1	0–1	0–1	3–0	2–1	1–1	2–1	2–2	0–0	2–3	0–2	0–3	1–0	1–2	0–0	—

Source: DFB
Legend: Blue = home team win; Yellow = draw; Red = away team win.

== Relegation play-offs ==
Arminia Bielefeld, who finished 16th, faced SV Darmstadt 98, the third-placed 2013–14 3. Liga side for a two-legged play-off. The winner on aggregate score after both matches earned a spot in the 2014–15 2. Bundesliga.

=== First leg ===
16 May 2014
20:30 CEST

SV Darmstadt 98	1–3	Arminia Bielefeld
Ivana 65'	Report	Müller 22'; Sahar 33'; Hille 85'

Stadion am Böllenfalltor, Darmstadt
Attendance: 16,300
Referee: Deniz Aytekin (Oberasbach)

Darmstadt	Bielefeld

GK	1	(Germany) Jan Zimmermann
RB	22	(Germany) Aaron Berzel		(substituted off) 83'
CB	4	(Germany) Aytaç Sulu (c)
CB	5	(Germany) Benjamin Gorka
LB	3	(Germany) Michael Stegmayer
CM	17	(Germany) Hanno Behrens
CM	8	(Germany) Jérôme Gondorf
RW	20	(Germany) Marcel Heller		(substituted off) 46'
LW	27	(Slovakia) Milan Ivana
CF	9	(Germany) Dominik Stroh-Engel	(yellow card) 68'
CF	7	(Germany) Marco Sailer		(substituted off) 79'
Substitutions:
GK	28	(Germany) David Salfeld
DF	15	(Germany) Benjamin Maas
DF	19	(Croatia) Josip Landeka
DF	21	(Germany) Sandro Sirigu		(substituted on) 46'
MF	6	(Germany) Julius Biada		(substituted on) 83'
MF	10	(Brazil) Elton da Costa		(substituted on) 79'
MF	23	(Germany) Benjamin Baier
Manager:
(Germany) Dirk Schuster

GK	24	(Germany) Stefan Ortega
RB	2	(Germany) Jonas Strifler
CB	19	(Germany) Felix Burmeister
CB	11	(Germany) Stephan Salger
LB	29	(Germany) Arne Feick	(yellow card) 36'
DM	6	(Germany) Tom Schütz	(yellow card) 52'
RM	10	(Poland) Kacper Przybyłko
CM	37	(Germany) Christian Müller
CM	21	(Germany) Patrick Schönfeld		(substituted off) 70'
LM	35	(Israel) Ben Sahar		(substituted off) 78'
CF	9	(Germany) Fabian Klos (c)		(substituted off) 89'
Substitutions:
GK	1	(Germany) Patrick Platins
DF	4	(Ghana) Marcel Appiah		(substituted on) 89'
MF	8	(Germany) Tim Jerat
MF	16	(Germany) Philipp Riese		(substituted on) 70'
MF	25	(Germany) Patrick Mainka
MF	30	(Germany) Sebastian Hille		(substituted on) 78'
MF	31	(Germany) Bashkim Renneke
Manager:
(Germany) Norbert Meier

Assistant referees:
Benjamin Brand
Marco Achmüller
Fourth official:
Robert Hartmann

=== Second leg ===
19 May 2014
20:30 CEST

Arminia Bielefeld	2–4 (a.e.t.)	SV Darmstadt 98
Burmeister 53'; Przybyłko 110'	Report	Stroh-Engel 23'; Behrens 51'; Gondorf 79' da Costa 120+2'

Bielefelder Alm, Bielefeld
Attendance: 26,200
Referee: Jochen Drees (Münster-Sarmsheim)

Bielefeld	Darmstadt

GK	1	(Germany) Stefan Ortega
RB	2	(Germany) Jonas Strifler
CB	19	(Germany) Felix Burmeister
CB	11	(Germany) Stephan Salger	(yellow card) 30'
LB	29	(Germany) Arne Feick
CM	6	(Germany) Tom Schütz
CM	16	(Germany) Philipp Riese	(yellow card) 66'
RW	10	(Poland) Kacper Przybyłko
AM	37	(Germany) Christian Müller		(substituted off) 17'
LW	35	(Israel) Ben Sahar	(yellow card) 20'	(substituted off) 72'
CF	9	(Germany) Fabian Klos (c)	(yellow card) 77'	(substituted off) 87'
Substitutions:
GK	1	(Germany) Patrick Platins
DF	4	(Ghana) Marcel Appiah		(substituted on) 87'
MF	8	(Germany) Tim Jerat
MF	21	(Germany) Patrick Schönfeld		(substituted on) 17'
MF	25	(Germany) Patrick Mainka
MF	30	(Germany) Sebastian Hille		(substituted on) 72'
MF	31	(Germany) Bashkim Renneke
Manager:
(Germany) Norbert Meier

GK	24	(Germany) Jan Zimmermann
RB	21	(Germany) Sandro Sirigu		(substituted off) 97'
CB	4	(Germany) Aytaç Sulu (c)
CB	5	(Germany) Benjamin Gorka
LB	3	(Germany) Michael Stegmayer
CM	17	(Germany) Hanno Behrens
CM	8	(Germany) Jérôme Gondorf	(yellow card) 30'	(substituted off) 112'
RW	20	(Germany) Marcel Heller	(yellow card) 75'
LW	27	(Slovakia) Milan Ivana		(substituted off) 70'
SS	7	(Germany) Marco Sailer	(yellow card) 45'
CF	9	(Germany) Dominik Stroh-Engel	(yellow card) 57'
Substitutions:
GK	28	(Germany) David Salfeld
DF	15	(Germany) Benjamin Maas
DF	19	(Croatia) Josip Landeka		(substituted on) 70'
DF	22	(Germany) Aaron Berzel		(substituted on) 98'
MF	6	(Germany) Julius Biada
MF	10	(Brazil) Elton da Costa		(substituted on) 112'
MF	23	(Germany) Benjamin Baier
Manager:
(Germany) Dirk Schuster

Assistant referees:
Tobias Christ
Christian Gittelmann
Fourth official:
Marco Fritz

5–5 on aggregate. Darmstadt won on away goals and is promoted to the 2. Bundesliga; Arminia is relegated to the 3. Liga.

== Season statistics ==
=== Top scorers ===
Updated 11 May 2014

Rank	Player	Club	Goals
1	(Turkey) Mahir Sağlık	Paderborn 07	15
1	(Slovakia) Jakub Sylvestr	Erzgebirge Aue	15
3	(Kosovo) Ilir Azemi	Greuther Fürth	14
4	(Cameroon) Mohammadou Idrissou	1. FC Kaiserslautern	13
4	(Germany) Simon Zoller	1. FC Kaiserslautern	13
6	(Netherlands) Charlison Benschop	Fortuna Düsseldorf	12
6	(Germany) Patrick Helmes	1. FC Köln	12
6	(Germany) Torsten Mattuschka	Union Berlin	12
6	(Albania) Alban Meha	Paderborn 07	12
10	(Germany) Sören Brandy	Union Berlin	11
10	(Albania) Edmond Kapllani	FSV Frankfurt	11
10	(Nigeria) Anthony Ujah	1.FC Köln	11

=== Top assists ===
Updated 11 May 2014

Rank	Player	Club	Assists
1	(Germany) Moritz Stoppelkamp	1860 Munich	13
2	(Germany) Torsten Mattuschka	Union Berlin	12
3	(Cameroon) Mohammadou Idrissou	1. FC Kaiserslautern	10
4	(Germany) Daniel Brosinski	Greuther Fürth	9
4	(Hungary) Zoltán Stieber	Greuther Fürth	9
6	(Australia) Mathew Leckie	FSV Frankfurt	8
6	(Germany) Marco Stiepermann	Energie Cottbus	8
6	(Germany) Mario Vrančić	Paderborn 07	8
9	(Germany) Daniel Halfar	1.FC Köln	7
9	(Austria) Michael Liendl	Fortuna Düsseldorf	7
9	(Germany) Marc Rzatkowski	FC St. Pauli	7
9	(Germany) Patrick Schönfeld	Arminia Bielefeld	7
9	(Germany) Florian Trinks	Greuter Fürth	7

=== Hat-tricks ===
Player	For	Against	Result	Date
(Ivory Coast) Boubacar Sanogo	Energie Cottbus	SC Paderborn	4–0	28 July 2013
(Albania) Edmond Kapllani	FSV Frankfurt	Dynamo Dresden	3–0	18 August 2013

== Attendances ==
No.	Team	Attendance	Change	Highest
1	1. FC Köln	46,235	13.6%	50,000
2	Fortuna 95	33,982	-26.1%	52,500
3	1. FC Kaiserslautern	29,529	-7.0%	45,293
4	FC St. Pauli	28,371	17.5%	29,063
5	Dynamo Dresden	27,004	8.2%	30,084
6	1. FC Union Berlin	19,788	15.7%	21,717
7	TSV 1860	19,312	-14.9%	33,600
8	Arminia Bielefeld	16,904	63.2%	26,200
9	VfL Bochum	16,166	11.4%	27,555
10	Karlsruher SC	16,145	34.8%	27,522
11	Greuther Fürth	11,926	-29.3%	16,165
12	SC Paderborn 07	10,998	25.3%	15,000
13	FC Energie Cottbus	9,647	-7.3%	18,500
14	FC Erzgebirge Aue	9,406	7.9%	15,000
15	VfR Aalen	7,399	-3.9%	11,128
16	FC Ingolstadt 04	6,785	-7.4%	13,734
17	FSV Frankfurt	6,288	14.1%	12,542
18	SV Sandhausen	5,570	8.1%	10,600
