= 2015–16 SV Darmstadt 98 season =

SV Darmstadt 98
2015–16 season
- Chairman: Klaus Rüdiger Fritsch
- Manager: Dirk Schuster
- Stadium: Stadion am Böllenfalltor
- Bundesliga: 14th
- DFB-Pokal: Round of 16
Home colours	Away colours

The 2015–16 SV Darmstadt 98 season is the club's 118th season. This will be the club's third season in the Bundesliga overall and its first since its most recent promotion.

== Background ==
Darmstadt 98 will be playing in their 118th overall season, and third overall in the top-flight Bundesliga, after they were promoted following a 1–0 win over FC St. Pauli on the final matchday of the 2014–15 2. Bundesliga season. This is their second-straight promotion after they were promoted from the 3. Liga the previous year. The promotion finished a 33-year run outside of top-flight football. They had previously played in the Bundesliga in the 1978–79 and 1981–82 seasons.

== Friendlies ==
=== Pre-season ===
Win Draw Loss

26 June 2015	Viktoria Urberach	0–9	Darmstadt 98	Rödermark, Germany
18:30 CET (UTC+01:00)		Report	Zunic 10'; Kempe 23', 41'; Stroh-Engel 35'; Winter 39'; Ivana 59'; Exslager 70', 75'; Sailer 84'	Attendance: 2000

7 July 2015	TSG Balingen	0–1	Darmstadt 98	Balingen, Germany
18:30 CET (UTC+01:00)		Report	Stark 30'	Stadium: Au-Stadion; Attendance: 1500

11 July 2015	Kehler FV	0–10	Darmstadt 98	Klosterreichenbach, Germany
15:30 CET (UTC+01:00)		Report	Sulu 6'; Stroh-Engel 8', 21'; Rausch 15'; Stegmayer 59' (pen.); Sailer 60', 73', 89'; Winter 70'; Stark 90'	Attendance: 650

18 July 2015	Darmstadt 98	2–3	Rot-Weiß Erfurt	Darmstadt, Germany
15:30 CET (UTC+01:00)	Rosenthal 22'; Rausch 50'	Report	Erb 54'; Tyrala 73' (pen.); Pigl 90'	Stadium: Merck-Stadion am Böllenfalltor; Attendance: 6,000; Referee: Daniel Schlager

28 July 2015	Viktoria Aschaffenburg	1–3	Darmstadt 98	Aschaffenburg, Germany
18:30 CET (UTC+01:00)	Amouzouvi 67'	Report	Kempe 38' (pen.); Sailer 53', 76'	Stadium: Stadion am Schönbusch; Attendance: 4,132; Referee: Simon Marx

31 July 2015	Darmstadt 98	3–1	Real Betis	Darmstadt, Germany
18:30 CET (UTC+01:00)	Jungwirth 24'; Stroh-Engel 42'; Rosenthal 89'	Report	Cejudo 15'	Stadium: Merck-Stadion am Böllenfalltor; Attendance: 9,100

=== Mid-season ===
Win Draw Loss

4 September 2015	Borussia Neunkirchen	2–6	Darmstadt 98	Neunkirchen, Germany
18:00 CET (UTC+01:00)	Ljaic 37'; Flätgen 55'	Report	Wagner 3', 13' (pen.), 39', 84'; Kempe 26'; Ivana 36'	Stadium: Ellenfeldstadion; Attendance: 500

9 October 2015	Darmstadt 98	2–0	RM Hamm Benfica	Ginsheim, Germany
15:30 CET (UTC+01:00)	Sirigu 74'; Sailer 81'	[www.sv98.de/home/lilien/aktuelles/nachrichten-ansicht/news/lilien-siegen-mit-20-gegen-hamm-benfica/ Report]

== Competitions ==
Win Draw Loss

=== Bundesliga ===
==== League table ====
Pos	Team	Pld	W	D	L	GF	GA	GD	Pts	Qualification or relegation
12	FC Augsburg	34	9	11	14	42	52	−10	38	
13	Werder Bremen	34	10	8	16	50	65	−15	38	
14	Darmstadt 98	34	9	11	14	38	53	−15	38	
15	1899 Hoffenheim	34	9	10	15	39	54	−15	37	
16	Eintracht Frankfurt (O)	34	9	9	16	34	52	−18	36	Qualification for the relegation play-offs

Source: DFB
Rules for classification: 1) Points; 2) Goal difference; 3) Goals scored; 4) Head-to-head points; 5) Head-to-head goal difference; 6) Head-to-head away goals scored; 7) Away goals scored; 8) Play-offs.
(O) Play-off winners

==== Results summary ====
Overall								Home						Away					
Pld	W	D	L	GF	GA	GD	Pts	W	D	L	GF	GA	GD	W	D	L	GF	GA	GD
34	9	11	14	38	53	−15	38	2	6	9	15	29	−14	7	5	5	23	24	−1

Last updated: 14 May 2016.
Source: Bundesliga

==== Results by round ====
Round	1	2	3	4	5	6	7	8	9	10	11	12	13	14	15	16	17	18	19	20	21	22	23	24	25	26	27	28	29	30	31	32	33	34
Ground	H	A	H	A	H	H	A	H	A	H	A	H	A	H	A	H	A	A	H	A	H	A	A	H	A	H	A	H	A	H	A	H	A	H
Result	D	D	D	W	L	W	D	L	W	L	L	D	L	D	W	L	L	W	L	W	L	L	D	L	D	D	D	D	W	W	L	L	W	L
Position	9	11	12	11	12	10	9	10	9	11	13	13	13	12	12	12	13	12	14	11	13	14	14	14	15	14	13	13	13	11	13	14	13	14

Updated to match(es) played on 14 May 2016. Source: Bundesliga
A = Away; H = Home; W = Win; D = Draw; L = Loss

==== Matches ====
15 August 2015 1	Darmstadt 98	2–2	Hannover 96	Darmstadt
15:30 CEST (UTC+02:00)	Heller 31', 54'; Sulu (yellow card) 58'	Report	Marcelo (yellow card) 34'; Benschop 48'; Sulu 62' (o.g.); Sobiech (yellow card) 79'	Stadium: Merck-Stadion am Böllenfalltor; Attendance: 17,000; Referee: Felix Brych

22 August 2015 2	Schalke 04	1–1	Darmstadt 98	Gelsenkirchen
15:30 CEST (UTC+02:00)	Draxler 47', (yellow card) 68'	Report	Rausch 9'; Sailer (yellow card) 52'; Wagner (yellow card) 90+4'	Stadium: Veltins-Arena; Attendance: 61,565; Referee: Benjamin Brand

29 August 2015 3	Darmstadt 98	0–0	TSG Hoffenheim	Darmstadt
15:30 CEST (UTC+02:00)	Niemeyer (yellow card) 25'; Gondorf (yellow card) 54'; Garics (yellow card) 62'	Report	Zuber (yellow card) 14'; Uth (yellow card) 25'	Stadium: Merck-Stadion am Böllenfalltor; Attendance: 17,000; Referee: Marco Fritz

12 September 2015 4	Bayer Leverkusen	0–1	Darmstadt 98	Leverkusen
15:30 CEST (UTC+02:00)	Papadopoulos (yellow card) 35'; Wendell (yellow card) 41'; Bellarabi (yellow card) 90+2'	Report	Sulu 8'; Mathenia (yellow card) 68'	Stadium: BayArena; Attendance: 29,396; Referee: Peter Sippel

19 September 2015 5	Darmstadt 98	0–3	Bayern Munich	Darmstadt
15:30 CEST (UTC+02:00)	Wagner (yellow card) 73'; Sulu (yellow card) 78'	Report	Vidal 20'; Coman 62'; Rode 63'; Martínez (yellow card) 80'	Stadium: Merck-Stadion am Böllenfalltor; Attendance: 17,000; Referee: Felix Zwayer

22 September 2015 6	Darmstadt 98	2–1	Werder Bremen	Darmstadt
20:00 CEST (UTC+02:00)	Holland (yellow card) 28'; Wagner 31' (pen.), 84'; Niemeyer (yellow card) 40'; Díaz (yellow card) 88'	Report	Bartels (yellow card) 10' (yellow-red card) 88'; Jóhannsson 19'; Wiedwald (yellow card) 30'	Stadium: Merck-Stadion am Böllenfalltor; Attendance: 17,000; Referee: Guido Winkmann

27 September 2015 7	Borussia Dortmund	2–2	Darmstadt 98	Dortmund
17:30 CEST (UTC+02:00)	Aubameyang 63', 71'	Report	Heller 17', (yellow card) 54'; Wagner (yellow card) 45+4'; Sulu 90'	Stadium: Signal Iduna Park; Attendance: 81,359; Referee: Robert Hartmann

2 October 2015 8	Darmstadt 98	2–3	Mainz 05	Darmstadt
20:30 CEST (UTC+02:00)	Heller 27'; Caldirola (yellow card) 52'; Sailer 57'	Report	Bell 15'; Latza (yellow card) 21'; Mallı 24' de Blasis 64'; Karius (yellow card) 70'	Stadium: Merck-Stadion am Böllenfalltor; Attendance: 17,000; Referee: Florian Meyer

17 October 2015 9	FC Augsburg	0–2	Darmstadt 98	Augsburg
15:30 CEST (UTC+02:00)	Baier (yellow card) 61'; Caiuby (yellow card) 67'	Report	Wagner 7'; Niemeyer 29'; Heller (yellow card) 47'; Garics (yellow card) 66'; Caldirola (yellow card) 85'	Stadium: WWK ARENA; Attendance: 30,009; Referee: Sascha Stegemann

24 October 2015 10	Darmstadt 98	0–1	VfL Wolfsburg	Darmstadt
15:30 CEST (UTC+02:00)	Rausch (yellow card) 59'; Wagner (yellow card) 62'	Report	Dante (yellow card) 75'; Caligiuri 78'	Stadium: Merck-Stadion am Böllenfalltor; Attendance: 15,800; Referee: Günter Perl

1 November 2015 11	VfB Stuttgart	2–0	Darmstadt 98	Stuttgart
15:30 CET (UTC+01:00)	Tytoń (yellow card) 33'; Die (yellow card) 54'; Klein (yellow card) 58'; Garics 68' (o.g.); Werner 90+4'	Report	Garics (yellow card) 61'; Díaz (yellow card) 90+1'	Stadium: Mercedes-Benz Arena; Attendance: 55,200; Referee: Robert Hartmann

7 November 2015 12	Darmstadt 98	1–1	Hamburger SV	Darmstadt
18:30 CET (UTC+01:00)	Wagner (yellow card) 25'; Gondorf (yellow card) 45'; Heller 47'; Niemeyer (yellow card) 52'; Garics (yellow card) 56'	Report	Lasogga 29' (pen.); Djourou (yellow card) 57'; Gregoritsch (yellow card) 85'	Stadium: Merck-Stadion am Böllenfalltor; Attendance: 17,000; Referee: Wolfgang Stark

22 November 2015 13	FC Ingolstadt	3–1	Darmstadt 98	Ingolstadt
17:40 CET (UTC+01:00)	Hartmann (yellow card) 54', (goal) 60' (pen.), 88'; Bauer 58'; Groß (yellow card) 63'	Report	Rosenthal (yellow card) 2'; Sulu 9', (yellow card) 90+2'; Niemeyer (yellow card) 49'	Stadium: Audi Sportpark; Attendance: 14,551; Referee: Knut Kircher

27 November 2015 14	Darmstadt 98	0–0	1. FC Köln	Darmstadt
20:30 CET (UTC+01:00)	Garics (yellow card) 45'; Sulu (yellow card) 74'	Report	Zoller (yellow card) 80'	Stadium: Merck-Stadion am Böllenfalltor; Attendance: 17,000; Referee: Deniz Aytekin

6 December 2015 15	Eintracht Frankfurt	0–1	Darmstadt 98	Frankfurt
17:30 CET (UTC+01:00)	Seferovic (yellow card) 39'; Stendera (yellow card) 58'; Zambrano (yellow card) 59'; Russ (yellow card) 87'	Report	Sulu 30'; Holland (yellow card) 50'; Niemeyer (yellow card) 58'; Mathenia (yellow card) 85'	Stadium: Commerzbank-Arena; Attendance: 51,500; Referee: Felix Brych

12 December 2015 16	Darmstadt 98	0–4	Hertha BSC	Darmstadt
15:30 CET (UTC+01:00)	Gondorf (yellow card) 38'; Wagner (yellow card) 39'; Rausch (yellow card) 58'; Vrančić (yellow card) 76'	Report	Ibišević 12', 50'; Plattenhardt 26'; Langkamp (yellow card) 38'; Kalou 77'	Stadium: Merck-Stadion am Böllenfalltor; Attendance: 17,000; Referee: Günter Perl

20 December 2015 17	Borussia Mönchengladbach	3–2	Darmstadt 98	Mönchengladbach
17:30 CET (UTC+01:00)	Xhaka (red card) 38'; Stindl 44', (yellow card) 45+1'; Nordtveit 51'; Wendt 86'	Report	Heller 28', (yellow card) 65'; Niemeyer (yellow card) 38'; Caldirola (yellow card) 45+2'; Holland (yellow card) 60'; Wagner 67'	Stadium: Stadion im Borussia-Park; Attendance: 53,610; Referee: Benjamin Brand

23 January 2016 18	Hannover 96	1–2	Darmstadt 98	Hanover
15:30 CET (UTC+01:00)	Almeida 10'; Sané (yellow card) 44'; Schulz (yellow card) 81'	Report	Niemeyer (yellow card) 22'; Wagner (yellow card) 25', (goal) 31', 47'; Gondorf (yellow card) 42'; Rausch (yellow card) 77'; Garics (yellow card) 84'	Stadium: HDI-Arena; Attendance: 35,600; Referee: Deniz Aytekin

30 January 2016 19	Darmstadt 98	0–2	Schalke 04	Darmstadt
15:30 CET (UTC+01:00)	Rausch (yellow card) 55'; Niemeyer (yellow card) 66'; Rajković (yellow card) 83'	Report	Meyer 43', (yellow card) 59'; Sané 53'; Goretzka (yellow card) 84'	Stadium: Merck-Stadion am Böllenfalltor; Attendance: 17,000; Referee: Daniel Siebert

7 February 2016 20	TSG Hoffenheim	0–2	Darmstadt 98	Sinsheim
17:30 CET (UTC+01:00)	Amiri (yellow card) 73'	Report	Sulu 33'; Heller (yellow card) 73'; Niemeyer (yellow card) 81'; Rajković (yellow card) 82', (goal) 85'	Stadium: Wirsol Rhein-Neckar-Arena; Attendance: 26,231; Referee: Christian Dingert

13 February 2016 21	Darmstadt 98	1–2	Bayer Leverkusen	Darmstadt
15:30 CET (UTC+01:00)	Wagner 28'; Gondorf (yellow card) 37'; Rosenthal (yellow card) 69'; Sulu (yellow card) 84'; Heller (yellow card) 85'; Niemeyer (yellow card) 88'; Rausch (yellow card) 90+2'	Report	Wendell (yellow card) 23'; Sulu 62' (o.g.); Brandt 77'; Ramalho (yellow card) 90'; Çalhanoğlu (yellow card) 90+2'	Stadium: Merck-Stadion am Böllenfalltor; Attendance: 16,800; Referee: Jochen Drees

20 February 2016 22	Bayern Munich	3–1	Darmstadt 98	Munich
15:30 CET (UTC+01:00)	Rafinha (yellow card) 39'; Müller 49', 71'; Kimmich (yellow card) 50'; Lewandowski 84'	Report	Wagner 26'	Stadium: Allianz Arena; Attendance: 75,000; Referee: Michael Weiner

27 February 2016 23	Werder Bremen	2–2	Darmstadt 98	Bremen
15:30 CET (UTC+01:00)	Ujah 33'; Wiedwald (yellow card) 43'; Yatabaré (yellow card) 45+1'; S. García (yellow card) 47'; Pizarro 89'	Report	Rajković (yellow card) 36'; Wagner 44' (pen.); Sulu (yellow card) 57', (goal) 82'; Niemeyer (yellow card) 71'	Stadium: Weserstadion; Attendance: 40,396; Referee: Robert Hartmann

2 March 2016 24	Darmstadt 98	0–2	Borussia Dortmund	Darmstadt
20:00 CET (UTC+01:00)		Report	Ramos 38'; Durm 53'; Subotić (yellow card) 81'	Stadium: Merck-Stadion am Böllenfalltor; Attendance: 17,000; Referee: Manuel Gräfe

6 March 2016 25	Mainz 05	0–0	Darmstadt 98	Mainz
15:30 CET (UTC+01:00)	Donati (red card) 57'	Report	Jungwirth (yellow card) 42'; Gondorf (yellow card) 45'; Rajković (yellow card) 63'; Niemeyer (yellow card) 84'; Vrančić (yellow card) 86'	Stadium: Coface Arena; Attendance: 34,000; Referee: Benjamin Brand

12 March 2016 26	Darmstadt 98	2–2	FC Augsburg	Darmstadt
15:30 CET (UTC+01:00)	Vrančić 12'; Wagner 40'; Heller (yellow card) 90+1'; Holland (yellow card) 90+5'	Report	Feulner 63'; Finnbogason 90' (pen.); Max (yellow card) 90+1'	Stadium: Merck-Stadion am Böllenfalltor; Attendance: 16,000; Referee: Bastian Dankert

19 March 2016 27	VfL Wolfsburg	1–1	Darmstadt 98	Wolfsburg
15:30 CET (UTC+01:00)	Schürrle (yellow card) 45+1', (goal) 90+3'	Report	Wagner 82'; Gondorf (yellow card) 89'	Stadium: Volkswagen Arena; Attendance: 26,422; Referee: Markus Schmidt

2 April 2016 28	Darmstadt 98	2–2	VfB Stuttgart	Darmstadt
15:30 CEST (UTC+02:00)	Wagner 26'; Niemeyer 51', (yellow card) 62'; Jungwirth (yellow card) 70'; Rausch (yellow card) 88'; Heller (yellow card) 90'	Report	Gentner 45'; Rupp 45+3'; Klein (yellow card) 90'	Stadium: Merck-Stadion am Böllenfalltor; Attendance: 17,000; Referee: Felix Zwayer

9 April 2016 29	Hamburger SV	1–2	Darmstadt 98	Hamburg
15:30 CEST (UTC+02:00)	N. Müller (yellow card) 33'; Spahić (yellow card) 90'; Cléber (yellow card) 90+1'; Holtby 90+1'	Report	Jungwirth (yellow card) 26'; Sulu 38'; Caldirola (yellow card) 45+1'; Gondorf 54'	Stadium: Volksparkstadion; Attendance: 57,000; Referee: Peter Sippel

16 April 2016 30	Darmstadt 98	2–0	FC Ingolstadt	Darmstadt
15:30 CEST (UTC+02:00)	Rausch (yellow card) 46', (goal) 51'; Wagner (yellow card) 68', (goal) 85'	Report	Christiansen (yellow card) 71'; Leckie (yellow card) 75'; Matip (yellow card) 89'	Stadium: Merck-Stadion am Böllenfalltor; Attendance: 15,600; Referee: Michael Weiner

23 April 2016 31	1. FC Köln	4–1	Darmstadt 98	Cologne
15:30 CEST (UTC+02:00)	Modeste 4', 35'; Risse 52', 75'; Gerhardt (yellow card) 59'; Lehmann (yellow card) 72'	Report	Gondorf 12', (yellow card) 81'; Garics (yellow card) 86'	Stadium: RheinEnergieSTADION; Attendance: 50,000; Referee: Christian Dingert

30 April 2016 32	Darmstadt 98	1–2	Eintracht Frankfurt	Darmstadt
15:30 CEST (UTC+02:00)	Vrančić 12'; Mathenia (yellow card) 55'; Jungwirth (yellow card) 86'	Report	Seferovic (yellow card) 19'; Huszti (yellow card) 37'; Hasebe 56'; Aigner 83'	Stadium: Merck-Stadion am Böllenfalltor; Attendance: 14,800; Referee: Manuel Gräfe

7 May 2016 33	Hertha BSC	1–2	Darmstadt 98	Berlin
15:30 CEST (UTC+02:00)	Darida 14'; Ibišević (yellow card) 55'; Skjelbred (yellow card) 80'; Jarstein (yellow card) 84'	Report	Gondorf 24', (yellow card) 52'; Wagner 82', (yellow card) 84' (yellow-red card) 87'	Stadium: Olympiastadion; Attendance: 60,280; Referee: Felix Brych

14 May 2016 34	Darmstadt 98	0–2	Borussia Mönchengladbach	Darmstadt
15:30 CEST (UTC+02:00)	Platte (yellow card) 45'; Garics (yellow card) 52'; Holland (yellow card) 80'	Report	Hazard 31'; Hahn 63'	Stadium: Merck-Stadion am Böllenfalltor; Attendance: 17,000; Referee: Peter Sippel

=== DFB-Pokal ===
7 August 2015 Round 1	TuS Erndtebrück	0–5	Darmstadt 98	Siegen
19:00 CEST (UTC+02:00)	Campagna (yellow card) 2'; Kröner (yellow card) 67'; Böhmer (yellow card) 81'	Report	Sailer 9'; Stroh-Engel 10', 66'; Heller 57'; Holland (yellow card) 59'; Rausch 84'	Stadium: Leimbachstadion; Attendance: 7,857; Referee: Florian Heft

27 October 2015 Round 2	Darmstadt 98	2–1	Hannover 96	Darmstadt
20:30 CET (UTC+01:00)	Caldirola (yellow card) 30'; Sulu 74'; Wagner 79'	Report	Andreasen (yellow card) 51'; Sobiech 75'; Albornoz (yellow card) 86'; Sané (yellow card) 90'	Stadium: Merck-Stadion am Böllenfalltor; Attendance: 15,900; Referee: Daniel Siebert

15 December 2015 Round of 16	Bayern Munich	1–0	Darmstadt 98	Munich
20:30 CET (UTC+01:00)	Rafinha (yellow card) 9'; Alonso 40'	Report		Stadium: Allianz Arena; Attendance: 72,500; Referee: Daniel Siebert

== Squad ==
=== Squad and statistics ===
As of 15 August 2015

No.	Pos	Nat	Player	Total		Bundesliga		DFB-Pokal	
No.	Pos	Nat	Player	Apps	Goals	Apps	Goals	Apps	Goals
1	GK	(Germany) GER	Patrick Platins	0	0	0	0	0	0
3	DF	(Germany) GER	Michael Stegmayer	0	0	0	0	0	0
4	DF	(Turkey) TUR	Aytaç Sulu	2	0	1	0	1	0
5	DF	(Germany) GER	Benjamin Gorka	0	0	0	0	0	0
6	MF	(Bosnia and Herzegovina) BIH	Mario Vrančić	1	0	0	0	1	0
7	FW	(Germany) GER	Marco Sailer	2	1	1	0	1	1
8	MF	(Germany) GER	Jérôme Gondorf	2	0	1	0	1	0
9	FW	(Germany) GER	Dominik Stroh-Engel	2	2	1	0	1	2
10	MF	(Germany) GER	Jan Rosenthal	2	0	1	0	1	0
11	MF	(Germany) GER	Tobias Kempe	2	0	1	0	1	0
13	DF	(Austria) AUT	György Garics	0	0	0	0	0	0
14	FW	(Germany) GER	Sandro Wagner	1	0	1	0	0	0
15	DF	(Costa Rica) CRC	Júnior Díaz	0	0	0	0	0	0
17	DF	(Germany) GER	Sandro Sirigu	0	0	0	0	0	0
18	MF	(Germany) GER	Peter Niemeyer	2	0	1	0	1	0
19	FW	(Germany) GER	Felix Platte	0	0	0	0	0	0
20	MF	(Germany) GER	Marcel Heller	2	3	1	2	1	1
23	MF	(Germany) GER	Florian Jungwirth	2	0	1	0	1	0
25	MF	(Germany) GER	Yannick Stark	0	0	0	0	0	0
27	MF	(Slovakia) SVK	Milan Ivana	0	0	0	0	0	0
31	GK	(Germany) GER	Christian Mathenia	2	0	1	0	1	0
32	DF	(Germany) GER	Fabian Holland	2	0	1	0	1	0
33	DF	(Italy) ITA	Luca Caldirola	2	0	1	0	1	0
34	MF	(Germany) GER	Konstantin Rausch	2	1	1	0	1	1
35	DF	(Serbia) SRB	Slobodan Rajković	0	0	0	0	0	0
36	MF	(Germany) GER	Jan Finger	0	0	0	0	0	0
37	MF	(Afghanistan) AFG	Ali Kazimi	0	0	0	0	0	0
38	MF	(Germany) GER	Nick Volk	0	0	0	0	0	0
39	DF	(Germany) GER	Noel Wembacher	0	0	0	0	0	0
40	GK	(Poland) POL	Łukasz Załuska	0	0	0	0	0	0

=== Transfers ===
==== In ====
No.	Pos.	Name	Age	NAT	EU	Moving from	Type	Transfer Window	Contract ends	Transfer fee	Sources
6	Midfielder	Mario Vrančić	26	Bosnia and Herzegovina	Yes	SC Paderborn	Transfer	Summer	30 June 2017	€500,000	
10	Midfielder	Jan Rosenthal	29	Germany	Yes	Eintracht Frankfurt	Transfer	Summer	30 June 2017	Free	
13	Defender	György Garics	31	Austria	Yes	Bologna	Transfer	Summer	30 June 2017	undisclosed	
14	Forward	Sandro Wagner	27	Germany	Yes	Hertha BSC	Transfer	Summer	30 June 2017	Free	
15	Defender	Júnior Díaz	31	Costa Rica	No	Mainz 05	Transfer	Summer	30 June 2017	Free	
18	Midfielder	Peter Niemeyer	31	Germany	Yes	Hertha BSC	Transfer	Summer	30 June 2018	Free	
32	Defender	Fabian Holland	24	Germany	Yes	Hertha BSC	Transfer	Summer	30 June 2017	€300,000	
33	Defender	Luca Caldirola	24	Italy	Yes	Werder Bremen	Loan	Summer	30 June 2016	€100,000	
34	Midfielder	Konstantin Rausch	25	Germany	Yes	VfB Stuttgart	Transfer	Summer	30 June 2016	Free	
35	Defender	Slobodan Rajković	26	Serbia	Yes	Hamburger SV	Transfer	Summer	30 June 2017	Free	
36	Midfielder	Jan Finger	18	Germany	Yes	Darmstadt 98 U19	Transfer	Summer	30 June 2016	Free	
37	Midfielder	Ali Kazimi	18	Afghanistan	Yes	Darmstadt 98 U19	Transfer	Summer	30 June 2016	Free	
38	Defender	Nick Volk	17	Germany	Yes	Darmstadt 98 U19	Transfer	Summer	30 June 2016	Free	
39	Defender	Noel Wembacher	18	Germany	Yes	Darmstadt 98 U19	Transfer	Summer	30 June 2016	Free	
40	Goalkeeper	Łukasz Załuska	33	Poland	Yes	Celtic	Transfer	Summer	30 June 2016	Free	

==== Out ====
No.	Pos.	Name	Age	NAT	Moving to	Type	Transfer Window	Transfer fee	Sources
10	FW	Maurice Exslager	24	Germany	1. FC Köln	End of Loan	Summer	–	
13	FW	Ronny König	32	Germany	Chemnitzer FC	Transfer	Summer	Free	
14	DF	Leon Balogun	27	Nigeria	Mainz 05	Transfer	Summer	Free	
17	MF	Hanno Behrens	25	Germany	1. FC Nürnberg	Transfer	Summer	Free	
18	DF	Romain Brégerie	28	France	FC Ingolstadt	Transfer	Summer	Free	
28	FW	Jan Rosenthal	29	Germany	Eintracht Frankfurt	End of Loan	Summer	–	
31	GK	Marius Sauss	22	Germany	Lupo Martini Wolfsburg	Transfer	Summer	Free	
32	DF	Fabian Holland	24	Germany	Hertha BSC	End of Loan	Summer	–	
	DF	Marco Komenda	18	Germany	Sportfreunde Siegen	End of Contract	Summer	–	
	DF	Janik Bachmann	19	Germany	Hannover 96 II	End of Contract	Summer	Free	
	DF	Serkan Fırat	21	Turkey	unknown	End of Contract	Summer	–	
	DF	Timon Fröhlich	19	Germany	unknown	End of Contract	Summer	–	
