= Aziz Bouhaddouz =

Moroccan footballer

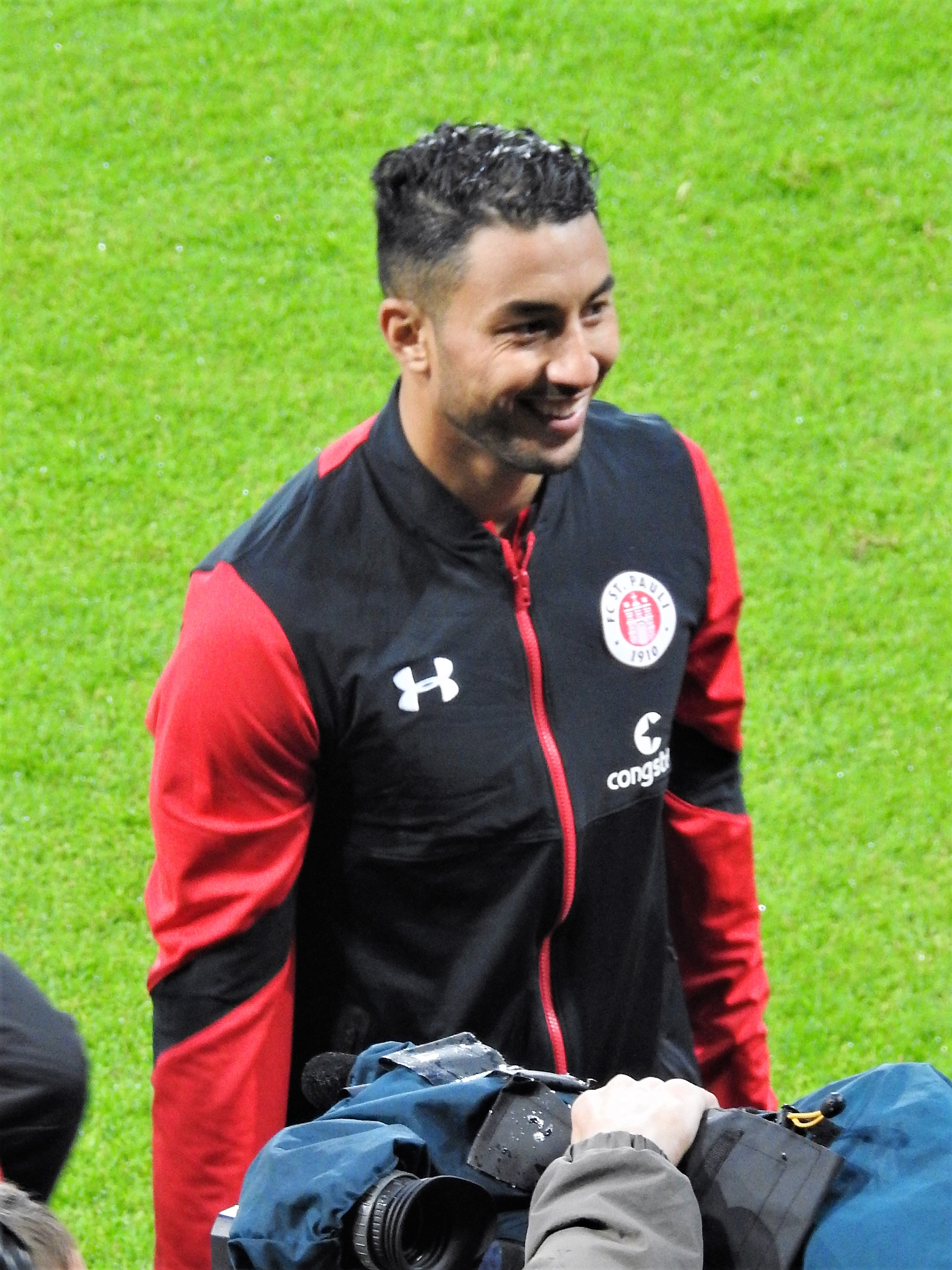
- Bouhaddouz with FC St. Pauli in 2017

Personal information
- Date of birth: 30 March 1987 (age 39)
- Place of birth: Berkane, Morocco
- Height: 1.88 m (6 ft 2 in)
- Position: Forward

Youth career
- 1996–2003: FC Dietzenbach
- 2003–2004: SpVgg 03 Neu-Isenburg
- 2004–2006: FSV Frankfurt

Senior career*
Years	Team	Apps	(Gls)
2006–2011	FSV Frankfurt	49	(3)
2009	→ Erzgebirge Aue (loan)	9	(1)
2009–2011	FSV Frankfurt II	18	(10)
2011–2012	Wehen Wiesbaden	27	(4)
2012–2013	Viktoria Köln	26	(15)
2013–2014	Bayer Leverkusen II	27	(24)
2014–2016	SV Sandhausen	56	(18)
2016–2018	FC St. Pauli	54	(19)
2018–2019	Al-Batin	10	(2)
2019–2021	SV Sandhausen	40	(6)
2021–2023	MSV Duisburg	70	(17)
2023	FSV Frankfurt	14	(1)
2024	VfB Ginsheim	0	(0)
Total		400	(120)

International career
2016–2018	Morocco	16	(3)
- * Club domestic league appearances and goals

Aziz Bouhaddouz (Arabic: عزيز بوحدوز; born 30 March 1987) is a Moroccan former professional footballer who played as a forward.

== Early life ==
Bouhaddouz was born in Berkane, Morocco. When he was one year old, his family moved to Dietzenbach in South Hessen, Germany.

== Club career ==
Bouhaddouz started his career at FC Dietzenbach. Following a spell at SpVgg Neu-Isenburg, he joined FSV Frankfurt in 2006 who were playing in the Oberliga Hessen at the time. In February 2009, he went on a 1.5-year loan to Erzgebirge Aue.

In 2011, Bouhaddouz joined SV Wehen Wiesbaden on a free transfer. He scored his first goal for the club in against VfL Osnabrück when he was also sent off. In summer 2012, he agreed to the termination of his contract which was due to end in 2013.

In September 2013, Bouhaddouz moved to the Bayer Leverkusen reserves after being released from his contract with Viktoria Köln. He scored 24 goals in 27 matches in the fourth-tier Regionalliga West.

On 5 May 2014, he signed a two-year contract with SV Sandhausen.

In April 2016, Bouhaddouz agreed to a three-year contract with FC St. Pauli. In his first season there, he amassed 15 goals and 6 assists in the league. Over two seasons at the club he scored 19 goals while assisting 8 in 54 league appearances.

In August 2018, he moved to Saudi Arabian side Al Batin. The transfer fee was undisclosed.

On 1 February 2021, the last day of the 2020–21 winter transfer window, Bouhadddouz left 2. Bundesliga club SV Sandhausen for 3. Liga side MSV Duisburg. After the season, he extended his contract until 2023. In May 2023, it was announced that he would leave Duisburg after the 2022–23 season.

Bouhadddouz returned to FSV Frankfurt in July 2023. In December, having scored one goal in 14 league appearances, it was announced that he had agreed the termination of his contract with FSV Frankfurt and would retire from playing at the end of the year.

== International career ==
Bouhadddouz was born in Morocco, but raised in Germany and was eligible for both national teams. He made his debut for the senior Morocco national team in a friendly 0–0 tie with Albania in August 2016. A month later, he scored his first goal for his country, netting in a 2017 Africa Cup of Nations qualification match against São Tomé and Príncipe.

In May 2018 he was named in Morocco's 23-man squad for the 2018 FIFA World Cup in Russia. He scored an own goal in the first match against Iran which resulted in a loss for Morocco.

== Career statistics ==
=== Club ===
Appearances and goals by club, season and competition
Club	Season	League			Cup		Continental		Total	
Club	Season	Division	Apps	Goals	Apps	Goals	Apps	Goals	Apps	Goals
FSV Frankfurt	2006–07	Hessenliga	3	2	—		—		3	2
FSV Frankfurt	2007–08	Regionalliga Süd	10	0	—		—		10	0
FSV Frankfurt	2009–10	2. Bundesliga	17	0	1	0	—		18	0
FSV Frankfurt	2010–11	2. Bundesliga	19	1	1	0	—		20	1
FSV Frankfurt	Total		49	3	2	0	—		51	3
Erzgebirge Aue (loan)	2008–09	3. Liga	9	1	—		—		9	1
FSV Frankfurt II	2010–11	Regionalliga Süd	18	10	—		—		18	10
Wehen Wiesbaden	2011–12	3. Liga	27	4	1	0	—		28	4
Viktoria Köln	2012–13	Regionalliga West	26	15	—		—		26	15
Bayer Leverkusen II	2013–14	Regionalliga West	27	24	—		—		27	24
SV Sandhausen	2014–15	2. Bundesliga	28	9	1	0	—		29	9
SV Sandhausen	2015–16	2. Bundesliga	28	9	2	0	—		30	9
SV Sandhausen	Total		56	18	3	0	—		59	18
FC St. Pauli	2016–17	2. Bundesliga	28	15	1	0	—		29	15
FC St. Pauli	2017–18	2. Bundesliga	26	4	1	0	—		27	4
FC St. Pauli	Total		54	19	2	0	—		56	19
Al Batin	2018–19	Saudi Professional League	10	2	—		—		10	2
SV Sandhausen	2019–20	2. Bundesliga	26	6	—		—		26	6
SV Sandhausen	2020–21	2. Bundesliga	14	0	2	0	—		16	0
SV Sandhausen	Total		40	6	2	0	—		42	6
MSV Duisburg	2020–21	3. Liga	16	5	—		—		16	5
MSV Duisburg	2021–22	3. Liga	27	9	—		—		27	9
MSV Duisburg	2022–23	3. Liga	27	3	—		—		27	3
MSV Duisburg	Total		70	17	0	0	—		70	17
FSV Frankfurt	2023–24	Regionalliga Südwest	14	1	1	0	—		15	1
Career total			400	120	11	0	—		411	120

=== International ===
Appearances and goals by national team and year
National team	Year	Apps	Goals
Morocco	2016	3	1
Morocco	2017	8	2
Morocco	2018	5	0
Total		16	3

Scores and results list Morocco's goal tally first, score column indicates score after each Bouhaddouz goal.

List of international goals scored by Aziz Bouhaddouz
No.	Date	Venue	Opponent	Score	Result	Competition
1	4 September 2016	Prince Moulay Abdellah Stadium, Rabat, Morocco	São Tomé and Príncipe	2–0	2–0	2017 Africa Cup of Nations qualification
2	20 January 2017	Stade d'Oyem, Oyem, Gabon	Togo	1–1	3–1	2017 Africa Cup of Nations
3	24 March 2017	Stade de Marrakech, Marrakesh, Morocco	Burkina Faso	2–0	2–0	Friendly
