= Jan Zimmermann (footballer, born 1985) =

German footballer (born 1985)

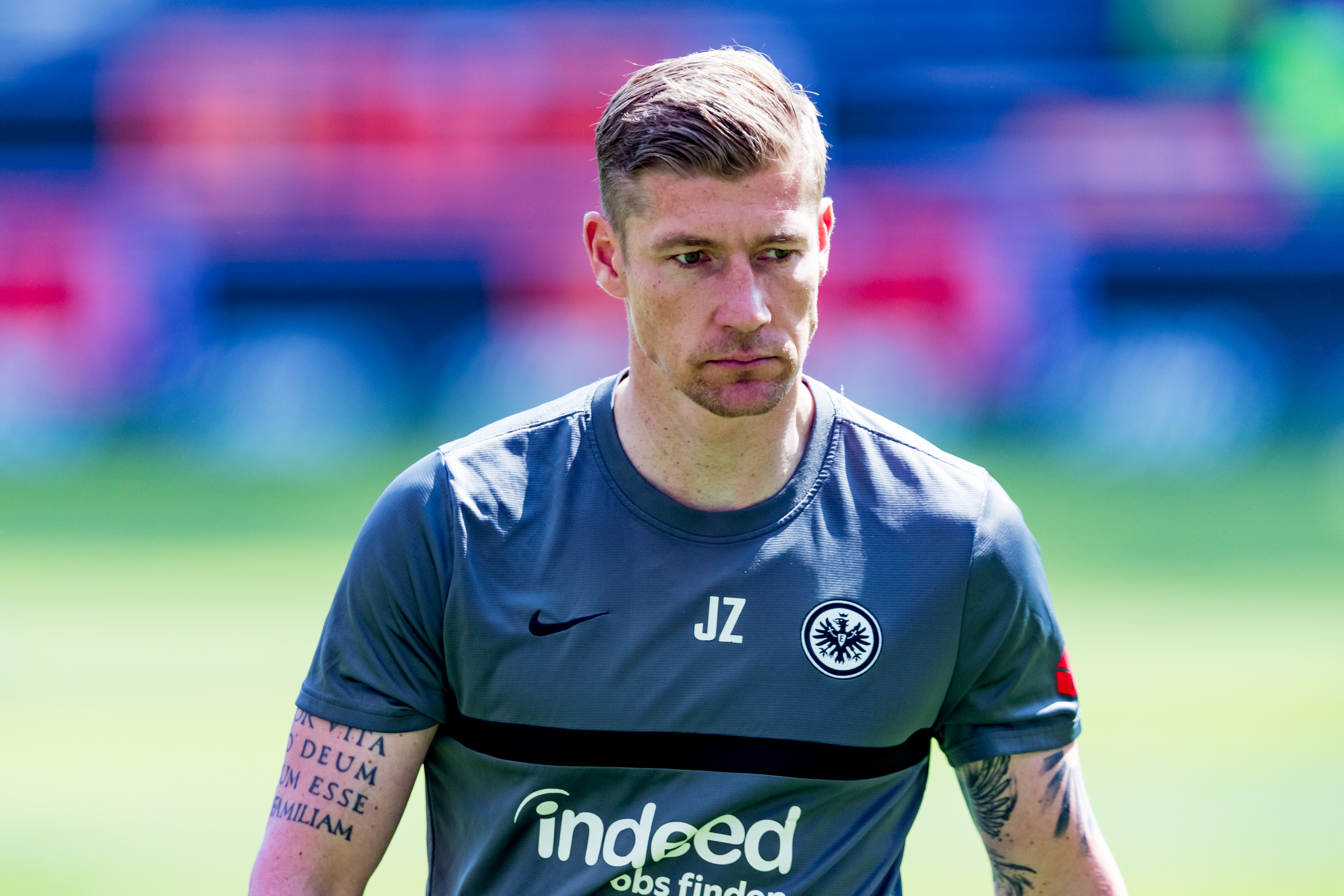
- Zimmermann in 2022

Personal information
- Date of birth: 19 April 1985 (age 41)
- Place of birth: Offenbach am Main, West Germany
- Height: 1.88 m (6 ft 2 in)
- Position: Goalkeeper

Team information
- Current team: Eintracht Frankfurt (goalkeeping coach)

Youth career
- 1991–1994: Kickers Obertshausen
- 1994–2004: Eintracht Frankfurt

Senior career*
Years	Team	Apps	(Gls)
2004–2010	Eintracht Frankfurt	5	(0)
2006–2010	Eintracht Frankfurt II	67	(0)
2011–2014	Darmstadt 98	127	(0)
2014–2016	1. FC Heidenheim	56	(0)
2016–2017	1860 Munich	13	(0)
2017–2020	Eintracht Frankfurt	0	(0)
Total		268	(0)
- * Club domestic league appearances and goals

Jan Zimmermann (born 19 April 1985) is a German football coach and former player who is the goalkeeping coach for Bundesliga side Eintracht Frankfurt.

== Career ==
Zimmermann was born in Offenbach am Main and raised in Hesse. A goalkeeper, he started his professional career at Eintracht Frankfurt for the reserve team, competing in the Oberliga, the fourth German tier. After absolving his youth academy time, Zimmermann earned a professional contract for the 2004–05 season and had five Bundesliga appearances as third choice goalkeeper. In 2011, he moved to Darmstadt 98.

On 13 May 2014, he signed a two-year contract with 1. FC Heidenheim.

== Career statistics ==
As of matches played on 20 May 2018

Appearances and goals by club, season and competition
Club	Season	League			Cup		Europe		Other		Total	
Club	Season	Division	Apps	Goals	Apps	Goals	Apps	Goals	Apps	Goal	Apps	Goalss
Eintracht Frankfurt	2005–06	Bundesliga	2	0	0	0	—		—		2	0
Eintracht Frankfurt	2006–07	Bundesliga	1	0	0	0	—		—		1	0
Eintracht Frankfurt	2007–08	Bundesliga	0	0	0	0	—		—		0	0
Eintracht Frankfurt	2008–09	Bundesliga	1	0	0	0	—		—		1	0
Eintracht Frankfurt	2009–10	Bundesliga	1	0	0	0	—		—		1	0
Eintracht Frankfurt	Total		5	0	0	0	—		—		5	0
Eintracht Frankfurt II	2006–07	Hessenliga	17	0	—		—		—		17	0
Eintracht Frankfurt II	2007–08	Hessenliga	18	0	—		—		—		18	0
Eintracht Frankfurt II	2008–09	Regionalliga Süd	19	0	—		—		—		19	0
Eintracht Frankfurt II	2009–10	Regionalliga Süd	13	0	—		—		—		13	0
Eintracht Frankfurt II	Total		67	0	—		—		—		67	0
Darmstadt 98	2010–11	Regionalliga Süd	14	0	—		—		—		14	0
Darmstadt 98	2011–12	3. Liga	38	0	—		—		—		38	0
Darmstadt 98	2012–13	3. Liga	37	0	—		—		—		37	0
Darmstadt 98	2013–14	3. Liga	38	0	2	0	—		2 (Note: Appearances in the Promotion play-offs)	0	42	0
Darmstadt 98	Total		127	0	2	0	—		2	0	131	0
1. FC Heidenheim	2014–15	2. Bundesliga	26	0	0	0	—		—		26	0
1. FC Heidenheim	2015–16	2. Bundesliga	30	0	0	0	—		—		30	0
1. FC Heidenheim	Total		56	0	0	0	—		—		56	0
1860 Munich	2016–17	2. Bundesliga	13	0	2	0	—		—		15	0
Eintracht Frankfurt	2017–18	Bundesliga	0	0	0	0	—		—		0	0
Eintracht Frankfurt	2018–19	Bundesliga	0	0	0	0	0	0	0	0	0	0
Eintracht Frankfurt	2019–20	Bundesliga	0	0	0	0	0	0	—		0	0
Eintracht Frankfurt	Total		0	0	0	0	0	0	0	0	0	0
Career total			268	0	4	0	0	0	2	0	274	0

== Honours ==
Eintracht Frankfurt

- DFB-Pokal: 2017-18

Darmstadt 98

- 3. Liga third place: 2013–14
