= Michael Stegmayer =

German footballer

Personal information
- Date of birth: 12 January 1985 (age 41)
- Place of birth: Heidenheim, Germany
- Height: 1.76 m (5 ft 9 in)
- Position: Defender

Team information
- Current team: SV Darmstadt 98 (team manager)

Youth career
- –2001: SSV Ulm
- 2001–2004: Bayern Munich

Senior career*
Years	Team	Apps	(Gls)
2004–2006	Bayern Munich II	50	(4)
2006–2007	VfL Wolfsburg	11	(0)
2007	VfL Wolfsburg II	4	(0)
2007–2008	Carl Zeiss Jena	30	(0)
2007	Carl Zeiss Jena II	1	(0)
2008–2009	VfR Aalen	29	(2)
2009–2010	FC Vaduz	23	(1)
2010–2012	SpVgg Unterhaching	61	(1)
2012–2016	Darmstadt 98	87	(2)
Total		296	(10)

Managerial career
- 2016–: Darmstadt 98 (team manager)
- * Club domestic league appearances and goals

Michael Stegmeier (born 12 January 1985) is a German former professional footballer who played as a defender.

== Club career ==
His former clubs are SSV Ulm, SV Altenberg (Dillingen), Bayern Munich II, VfL Wolfsburg, Carl Zeiss Jena and VfR Aalen. In the 2009–10 season, Stegmayer was with FC Vaduz.

Stegmayer has appeared in 11 Bundesliga matches for VfL Wolfsburg.

== International career ==
Stegmayer played more than 40 games in different German Football Association-youth teams.

== Career statistics ==
Appearances and goals by club, season and competition
Club	Season	League			Cup (Note: Includes German Cup and Liechtenstein Cup.)		Continental (Note: Includes UEFA Europa League.)		Other (Note: Includes promotion playoff.)		Total		Ref.
Club	Season	League	Apps	Goals	Apps	Goals	Apps	Goals	Apps	Goals	Apps	Goals	Ref.
Bayern Munich II	2004–05	Regionalliga Süd	26	2	2	0	—		—		28	2	
Bayern Munich II	2005–06	Regionalliga Süd	24	2	—		—		—		24	2	
Bayern Munich II	Total		50	4	2	0	0	0	0	0	52	4	—
VfL Wolfsburg	2006–07	Bundesliga	11	0	2	0	—		—		13	0	
VfL Wolfsburg II	2006–07	Oberliga Nord	4	0	—		—		—		4	0	
Carl Zeiss Jena	2007–08	2. Bundesliga	30	0	5	0	—		—		35	0	
Carl Zeiss Jena II	2007–08	NOFV-Oberliga Süd	1	0	—		—		—		1	0	
VfR Aalen	2008–09	3. Liga	29	2	—		—		—		29	2	
Vaduz	2009–10	Challenge League	23	1			4	0	—		27	1	
SpVgg Unterhaching	2010–11	3. Liga	26	0	—		—		—		26	0	
SpVgg Unterhaching	2011–12	3. Liga	35	1	2	0	—		—		37	1	
SpVgg Unterhaching	Total		61	1	2	0	0	0	0	0	63	1	—
Darmstadt 98	2012–13	3. Liga	38	1	—		—		—		38	1	
Darmstadt 98	2013–14	3. Liga	37	1	2	0	—		2	0	41	1	
Darmstadt 98	2014–15	2. Bundesliga	12	0	0	0	—		—		12	0	
Darmstadt 98	2015–16	Bundesliga	0	0	0	0	—		—		0	0	
Darmstadt 98	Total		87	2	2	0	0	0	2	0	91	2	—
Career total			296	10	13	0	4	0	2	0	315	10	—

== Honours ==
Bayern Munich II

- IFA Shield: 2005
