= 2013–14 SV Darmstadt 98 season =

SV Darmstadt 98
2013–14 season
- Chairman: Klaus Rüdiger Fritsch
- Manager: Dirk Schuster
- Stadium: Stadion am Böllenfalltor
- 3. Liga: 3rd
- DFB-Pokal: Eliminated Second Round (vs Schalke 04)
- Top goalscorer: League: Dominik Stroh-Engel (27); All: Dominik Stroh-Engel (27)
- Highest home attendance: 12,500
- Lowest home attendance: 4,200
- Biggest win: 6-0 (vs Hansa Rostock)
- Biggest defeat: 0-3 (vs Rot-Weiss Erfurt)
Home colours	Away colours
- All statistics correct as of 10 July 2015.

The 2013–14 SV Darmstadt 98 season was the club's 116th season. This was the club's 3rd season in the 3. Liga overall and since promotion.

== Background ==
SV Darmstadt 98 played their 3rd season in the new formed 3. Liga after having escaped relegation due to local rivals Kickers Offenbach having their licence revoked due to insolvency.

== Competitions ==
=== 3. Liga ===
==== League table ====
Pos	Team	Pld	W	D	L	GF	GA	GD	Pts	Promotion, qualification or relegation
1	1. FC Heidenheim (C, P)	38	23	10	5	59	25	+34	79	Promotion to 2. Bundesliga and qualification for DFB-Pokal
2	RB Leipzig (P)	38	24	7	7	65	34	+31	79	Promotion to 2. Bundesliga and qualification for DFB-Pokal
3	Darmstadt 98 (O, P)	38	21	9	8	58	29	+29	72	Qualification to promotion play-offs and DFB-Pokal
4	Wehen Wiesbaden	38	15	11	12	43	44	−1	56	Qualification for DFB-Pokal
5	VfL Osnabrück	38	15	10	13	50	39	+11	55	

Source: kicker.de
Rules for classification: 1) points; 2) goal difference; 3) number of goals scored.
(C) Champions; (O) Play-off winners; (P) Promoted
