= Kacper Tatara =

Polish footballer

Personal information
- Date of birth: 20 March 1988 (age 38)
- Place of birth: Lublin, Poland
- Height: 1.81 m (5 ft 11 in)
- Position: Forward

Youth career
- Motor Lublin

Senior career*
Years	Team	Apps	(Gls)
2002–2003	Legion Lublin		
2003–2004	UMCS Lublin		
2004	Motor Lublin II		
2005	Cracovia II		
2006–2009	Cracovia	2	(0)
2006–2007	→ Stal Rzeszów (loan)		
2009–2011	Znicz Pruszków	41	(12)
2011–2012	Chojniczanka Chojnice	24	(4)
2012–2013	Darmstadt 98	17	(3)
2013–2014	Dolcan Ząbki	2	(0)
2014	Okocimski KS Brzesko	13	(0)
2014–2015	Legionovia Legionowo	9	(1)
- * Club domestic league appearances and goals

Kacper Tatara (born 20 March 1988) is a Polish former professional footballer who played as a forward.

He previously played for the Polish Ekstraklasa club Cracovia and the German 3. Liga side Darmstadt 98.
