= Milad Salem =

Afghan footballer

Milad Salem Fakhri
Personal information
- Full name: Milad Salem Fakhri
- Date of birth: 3 March 1988 (age 38)
- Place of birth: Kabul, Afghanistan
- Height: 1.77 m (5 ft 10 in)
- Position: Forward

Team information
- Current team: FC Gießen
- Number: 20

Youth career
- 1997–1999: FSV Frankfurt
- 1999–2004: Kickers Offenbach
- 2004–2007: Eintracht Frankfurt

Senior career*
Years	Team	Apps	(Gls)
2007–2008	Eintracht Frankfurt II	31	(1)
2009–2010	Germania Ober-Roden	35	(10)
2010–2012	Wehen Wiesbaden II	32	(3)
2010–2012	Wehen Wiesbaden	12	(6)
2012–2014	SV Elversberg	64	(6)
2014–2015	VfL Osnabrück	15	(2)
2015–2017	Holstein Kiel	10	(1)
2017	FSV Frankfurt	8	(0)
2017–2018	SV Elversberg	13	(1)
2019–2020	Eintracht Trier	20	(2)
2020–2022	FC Gießen	7	(1)

International career^{‡}
2008–2018	Afghanistan	5	(0)
- * Club domestic league appearances and goals as of 15:50, 11 November 2020 (UTC) ‡ National team caps and goals as of 24 October 2018

Milad Salem Fakhri (Dari: میلاد سالم, born 3 March 1988) is an Afghan former professional footballer.

== Career ==
Born in Kabul, Salem began his career in the youth set ups of FSV Frankfurt and Kickers Offenbach and in July 2004 moved to Eintracht Frankfurt, where he was promoted to the reserve team in 2007. In 2010, he joined 3. Liga side SV Wehen Wiesbaden, where he started with the reserves but was quickly promoted to the first team.

On 21 May 2019, Salem joined SV Eintracht Trier 05.

== International career ==
Salem played three games for the Afghanistan national football team in 2008. in 2016, 8 years after his debut, he was again called up for the national team, for a friendly match on 13 November against Tajikistan.
