= György Garics =

Hungarian-born Austrian footballer (born 1984)

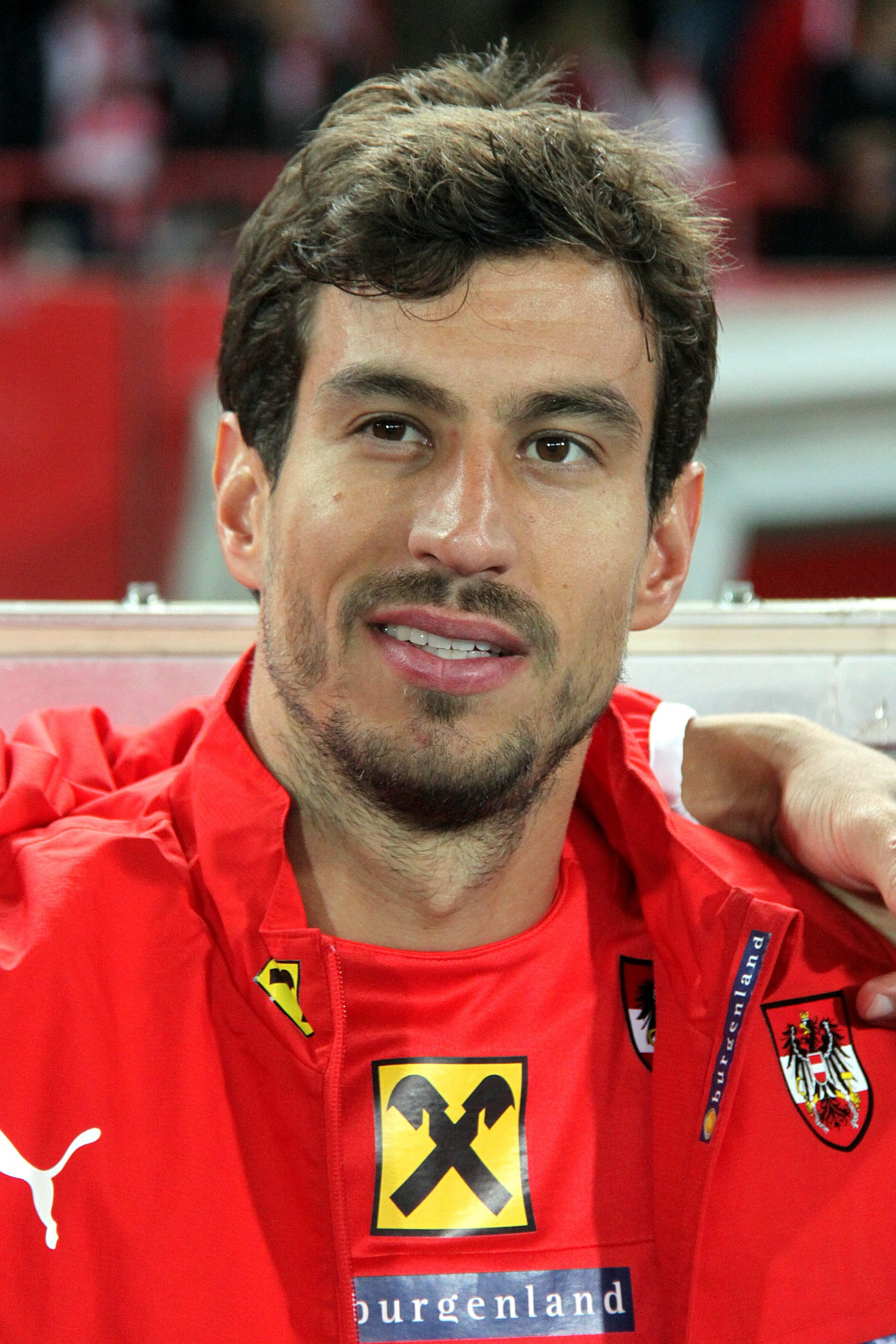
- Garics with Austria in 2015

Personal information
- Date of birth: 8 March 1984 (age 42)
- Place of birth: Szombathely, Hungary
- Height: 1.83 m (6 ft 0 in)
- Position: Full-back

Youth career
- 1990–1998: Haladás
- 1998–2001: Rapid Vienna

Senior career*
Years	Team	Apps	(Gls)
2001–2002	Rapid Vienna II	18	(2)
2002–2006	Rapid Vienna	81	(1)
2006–2008	Napoli	37	(1)
2008–2010	Atalanta	65	(1)
2010–2015	Bologna	102	(2)
2015–2016	Darmstadt 98	21	(0)
2017–2018	Imolese	13	(0)
Total		337	(7)

International career
2005	Austria U21	25	(2)
2006–2016	Austria	41	(2)
- * Club domestic league appearances and goals

György Garics (German pronunciation: [ˈɡaʁɪtʃ]; Croatian: Đorđe Garić; born 8 March 1984) is a former professional footballer who played as a full-back. Born in Hungary, he made 41 appearances for the Austria national team scoring twice.

After turning professional at Rapid Vienna in Austria, Garics spent the rest of his football career in Italy, apart from a season with Darmstadt 98 in Germany.

== Football career ==
György Garics was born in Szombathely, Hungary, to ethnic Croat parents, Garics moved to Vienna when he was 14 years old and started his football career in Austria with prominent side Rapid Vienna in 2002; during his first season as a teenager he made two appearances.

By the 2004–05 season the young attacking wingback has become more of a prominent member in the first team and Rapid Vienna won the Austrian Bundesliga. Around this time he also became captain of the Austria under-21 national team.

Having made 81 appearances for Rapid Vienna and scored one goal, he was bought by Italian side Napoli for €500,000, making his debut against Triestina on 23 September 2006. Soon after, he achieved a call up on 6 October 2006 for the Austria national team against Liechtenstein and scored on his international debut.

He was also called up to the Euro 2008 squad and started Austria's third match against Germany in Vienna.

The case of Garics divided Hungarian public sentiment, as it is the first high-profile case of a player choosing a national team other than Hungary, and is also considered a failure on the part of the Hungarian Football Federation to consider to select him in time for the national team.

Garics signed for Atalanta from Napoli in a co-ownership deal in early July 2008, for €1.5 million. Atalanta bought full ownership of the player for €1 million on 26 June 2009.

After Atalanta were relegated from Serie A, Garics was sold outright to Bologna on 9 August 2010, for €3 million. Garics was seriously injured in 2011, and had to miss most of the spring season at Bologna.

On 14 August 2015, Garics joined newly promoted Bundesliga club SV Darmstadt 98 on a two-year deal. He left the club on 30 August 2016.

== Honours ==
Rapid Vienna

- Austrian Bundesliga: 2004–05
