= Rudi Hübner =

German footballer

Personal information
- Date of birth: 15 June 1986 (age 40)
- Place of birth: Riga, Soviet Union
- Position: Forward

Youth career
- Rot-Weiß Darmstadt
- –2007: SC Viktoria Griesheim

Senior career*
Years	Team	Apps	(Gls)
2007–2009	SV Darmstadt 98	61	(15)
2009–2010	Rot-Weiß Darmstadt	32	(27)
2010–2011	Wormatia Worms	30	(17)
2011–2014	SV Darmstadt 98	37	(4)
2014	FSV Fernwald	6	(4)
2014–2015	1. FC Eschborn	23	(18)
2015–	SV Wiesbaden	0	(0)
- * Club domestic league appearances and goals as of 27 June 2015

Rudi Hübner (born 15 June 1986) is a German former footballer. A right-footed forward, he was the most prolific goal scorer for the Wormatia Worms during the 2010–2011 season, scoring 17 goals in 30 appearances. In 2011, he moved to SV Darmstadt 98, where he had previously played between 2007 and 2009.
