= Preston Zimmerman =

American soccer player

Personal information
- Full name: Preston Mark Zimmerman
- Date of birth: November 21, 1988 (age 37)
- Place of birth: Pasco, Washington, United States
- Height: 5 ft 11 in (1.80 m)
- Position: Winger

Youth career
- –2004: Crossfire Premier
- 2004–2006: IMG Soccer Academy
- 2006–2007: Hibernian & Caledonian

Senior career*
| Years | Team | Apps | (Gls) |
| 2007–2008 | Hamburger SV II | 36 | (9) |
| 2008–2009 | Kapfenberger SV | 21 | (3) |
| 2010–2011 | Mainz 05 II | 44 | (10) |
| 2011–2013 | SV Darmstadt 98 | 64 | (12) |
| 2013–2016 | TSV Schott Mainz | 28 | (17) |

International career
| 2007 | United States U20 | 10 | (2) |
- * Club domestic league appearances and goals

Preston Mark Zimmerman (born November 21, 1988) is a retired American soccer player.

== Personal life ==
Zimmerman was born in Auburn, Washington. He attended McLoughlin Middle School in Pasco, Washington.

== Club career ==
=== Hamburger SV ===
As an 18-year-old, Zimmerman joined the German team Hamburger SV, where he spent most of his time with Hamburg's reserve team. As a striker, Zimmerman played 14 games and scored three goals for the reserves during the 2006–2007 season. Zimmerman was originally signed while he was only 17 but the contract did not become official until he turned 18, skirting FIFA's rules on foreign transfers by minors.

=== Kapfenberger SV ===
After a trial stint at Belgian club Cercle Brugge, it was announced on August 29, 2008, that Zimmerman was sold to the newly promoted Austrian Bundesliga club Kapfenberger SV, where he signed a two-year deal. Zimmerman made his Austrian Bundesliga debut as a second-half substitute in a losing effort to SK Austria Kärnten, and scored his first goal for KSV on November 22 against Austrian giants Red Bull Salzburg.

=== Mainz 05 ===
On January 21, 2010, he returned to Germany, signing an amateur contract for FSV Mainz 05, where he played for the reserve team.

=== SV Darmstadt 98 ===
On June 2, 2011, it was announced that Zimmerman would be joining recently promoted 3. Liga side SV Darmstadt. After two seasons with the club, Zimmerman left the club on June 17, 2013, with the plan to retire and return to school.

=== TSV Schott Mainz ===
In July 2013, he joined six-tier club TSV Schott Mainz. In his first season there, he achieved promotion to the fifth-tier Oberliga Rheinland-Pfalz/Saar with the club.

== International career ==
Zimmerman was a last-minute addition to the U.S. team at the 2007 FIFA U-20 World Cup in Canada following an injury to Johann Smith, but he did not see any playing time. He has since been called up to U-23 camps.

== USMNT Controversy ==
Zimmerman made news with his comments regarding the selection of certain players by Jürgen Klinsmann whom Zimmerman considered to be "fake Americans". However it has been pointed out that many of the players active on the USMNT prior to Klinsmann's takeover hold dual nationality as well.
