= Florian Abel (footballer) =

German footballer

Personal information
- Date of birth: 14 August 1989 (age 37)
- Place of birth: Oberhausen, West Germany
- Height: 1.76 m (5 ft 9 in)
- Position: Midfielder

Team information
- Current team: KFC Uerdingen 05
- Number: 8

Youth career
- 1993–2008: Rot-Weiß Oberhausen

Senior career*
Years	Team	Apps	(Gls)
2008–2011	Rot-Weiß Oberhausen II	72	(9)
2010–2012	Rot-Weiß Oberhausen	13	(1)
2012–2013	Wuppertaler SV	32	(5)
2013–2015	Alemannia Aachen II	19	(6)
2013–2015	Alemannia Aachen	23	(0)
2015–2016	KFC Uerdingen 05	29	(5)
2016–2018	SV Sonsbeck	50	(17)
2018	TuRu Düsseldorf	15	(0)
2018–2023	1. FC Bocholt	125	(8)
2023–	KFC Uerdingen 05	30	(1)
- * Club domestic league appearances and goals as of 20 June 2024

Florian Abel (born 14 August 1989) is a German footballer who plays for KFC Uerdingen 05 in Regionalliga West.

Abel was born in Oberhausen. He made his professional debut for Rot-Weiß Oberhausen during the final round of fixtures of the 2009–10 2. Bundesliga season away to Arminia Bielefeld, as a substitute for Mike Terranova.
