= Andreas Gaebler =

German footballer

Personal information
- Date of birth: 17 January 1984 (age 42)
- Place of birth: Pößneck, East Germany
- Height: 1.84 m (6 ft 0 in)
- Position: Centre-back

Youth career
- FSV Offenbach
- SV Edenkoben
- –2003: 1. FC Kaiserslautern

Senior career*
Years	Team	Apps	(Gls)
2003–2007	1. FC Kaiserslautern II	93	(5)
2006–2007	1. FC Kaiserslautern	0	(0)
2007–2009	SV Wilhelmshaven	61	(1)
2009–2010	1. FC Magdeburg	24	(0)
2010–2011	SV Wilhelmshaven	31	(0)
2011–2013	Darmstadt 98	56	(7)
2013–2017	FC Homburg	115	(1)
2017–2018	SV Morlautern	35	(2)
Total		415	(16)
- * Club domestic league appearances and goals

Andreas Gaebler (born 17 April 1984) is a German former professional footballer who played as a centre-back.
