= Marcus Steegmann =

German football player for Viktoria Köln (born 1982)

Personal information
- Date of birth: 4 February 1982 (age 44)
- Place of birth: Köln, West Germany
- Height: 1.80 m (5 ft 11 in)
- Position: Forward

Team information
- Current team: Viktoria Köln
- Number: 19

Youth career
- –1993: Blau-Weiß Königsdorf
- 1993–1999: 1. FC Köln

Senior career*
Years	Team	Apps	(Gls)
1999–2003	1. FC Köln II	95	(26)
2003–2004	Hamburger SV II	29	(6)
2004–2005	Borussia Dortmund II	27	(10)
2004–2006	Borussia Dortmund	5	(0)
2006–2008	VfR Aalen	67	(18)
2008–2010	SpVgg Unterhaching	55	(8)
2010–2011	TuS Koblenz	35	(10)
2011–2013	SV Darmstadt 98	60	(15)
2013–2016	Viktoria Köln	52	(10)
- * Club domestic league appearances and goals as of 8 December 2015

Marcus Steegmann (born 4 February 1982) is a German football player for Viktoria Köln.
