= Benjamin Maas =

German footballer

Personal information
- Date of birth: 23 January 1989 (age 37)
- Place of birth: Schwäbisch Hall, West Germany
- Position: Central defender

Team information
- Current team: Wormatia Worms
- Number: 5

Youth career
- TSV Neuenstein
- TSV Crailsheim
- TSV Backnang
- –2008: VfB Stuttgart

Senior career*
Years	Team	Apps	(Gls)
2008–2009	SV Sandhausen	0	(0)
2009–2010	1899 Hoffenheim II	5	(0)
2010–2012	SpVgg Greuther Fürth II	44	(9)
2012–2014	SV Darmstadt 98	36	(0)
2014–	Wormatia Worms	40	(7)
- * Club domestic league appearances and goals as of 13 October 2015

Benjamin Maas (born 23 January 1989) is a German former footballer who played as a defender. He played for clubs such as SpVgg Greuther Fürth II, SV Darmstadt 98, and Wormatia Worms. As of 2021, he was a coach for the Celtic Worms.

== Career ==
Maas was released by VfB Stuttgart as a 19-year-old, signing for SV Sandhausen where he spent a season without making a first-team appearance. He spent the next three years playing reserve team football, one season for 1899 Hoffenheim II (where he won Oberliga Baden-Württemberg title) and two for SpVgg Greuther Fürth II before signing for SV Darmstadt 98 of the 3. Liga in 2012. He made his debut for the club in August of that year, as a substitute for Benjamin Gorka in a 2–1 win over Preußen Münster. He was regularly used as a substitute during the 2013–14 season, which saw Darmstadt surpisngly finish in third place and win promotion after a playoff win over Arminia Bielefeld, which Maas didn't play in. He left the club in July 2014.
