= Nicolas Roth =

German footballer

Personal information
- Date of birth: 28 August 1990 (age 36)
- Place of birth: Illinois, United States
- Height: 1.83 m (6 ft 0 in)
- Position: Midfielder

Youth career
- –2005: Viktoria Aschaffenburg
- 2005–2009: SpVgg Greuther Fürth

Senior career*
Years	Team	Apps	(Gls)
2009–2011	SpVgg Greuther Fürth II	33	(3)
2011–2012	SV Wehen Wiesbaden	5	(0)
2012–2013	SV Waldhof Mannheim	25	(1)
- * Club domestic league appearances and goals as of 12 July 2013

Nicolas Roth (28 August 1990 in Würzburg) is a German footballer who played in the 3. Liga for SV Wehen Wiesbaden.
