= Burak Bilgin =

German footballer

Personal information
- Date of birth: 19 July 1992 (age 34)
- Place of birth: Darmstadt, Germany
- Height: 1.75 m (5 ft 9 in)
- Position: Forward

Youth career
- SV Darmstadt 98
- –2009: 1. FSV Mainz 05
- 2009–2011: SV Darmstadt 98

Senior career*
Years	Team	Apps	(Gls)
2011–	SV Darmstadt 98	4	(0)
- * Club domestic league appearances and goals as of 16 March 2013

Burak Bilgin (born 19 July 1992) is a German footballer who plays for SV Darmstadt 98. He made his 3. Liga debut for the club in November 2011, as a substitute for Oliver Heil in a 4–0 win over Carl Zeiss Jena.
