= Martin Abraham =

Czech footballer (born 1978)

Personal information
- Date of birth: 20 September 1978 (age 48)
- Place of birth: Moravská Třebová, Czechoslovakia
- Height: 1.81 m (5 ft 11 in)
- Position: Midfielder

Youth career
- 1985–1987: Rychnov na Moravě
- 1987–1988: Mladějov na Moravě
- 1988–1993: Moravská Třebová
- 1993–1997: FC Zbrojovka Brno
- 1997–1999: FC Zeman Brno
- 1999–2000: FC Dolní Kounice
- 2000–2001: 1. FC Slovácko

Senior career*
| Years | Team | Apps | (Gls) |
| 2001–2004 | 1. FC Slovácko | 95 | (7) |
| 2005–2006 | Slovan Liberec | 27 | (2) |
| 2006–2007 | FK Mladá Boleslav | 24 | (2) |
| 2007 | Sparta Prague | 5 | (1) |
| 2008 | Slavia Prague | 12 | (2) |
| 2008–2009 | → AEK Larnaca (loan) | 13 | (2) |
| 2010 | → FC Tescoma Zlín (loan) | 10 | (0) |
| 2010–2011 | SV Wehen Wiesbaden | 29 | (4) |
| 2012 | Bohemians 1905 | 13 | (1) |
| 2012–2014 | 1. FK Příbram | 12 | (1) |
| 2013– | → FSV Budissa Bautzen (loan) | | |
- * Club domestic league appearances and goals

Martin Abraham (born 20 September 1978) is a Czech retired professional footballer, who played as a midfielder in the Czech Republic, Cyprus and Germany.

== Career ==
Abraham was born in Moravská Třebová. Having played at youth level for Roubina Dolní Kounice and FC Zeman Brno, he started his professional career with 1. FC Slovácko. After moving to Slovan Liberec with whom he won the 2005–06 Czech First League, he transferred to FK Mladá Boleslav. Abraham was called up to the Czech Republic national team by Karel Brückner for the Euro 2008 qualification games on 7 October 2006 against San Marino and on 11 October 2006 against Ireland. He was an unused substitute in both games.

Abraham joined Sparta Prague in July 2007, signing a three-year contract for a fee of 15 million koruna. He scored his first goal for the club after entering the game as a substitute in a 4–1 league victory away at Viktoria Žižkov on 25 August 2007. Abraham's stay at Sparta was short-lived, playing only six league games before transferring to Prague derby rivals Slavia Prague in January 2008 for 10 million koruna. He played 12 games for Slavia in the second half of the 2007–08 Czech First League as the club became league champions.

Abraham joined Cypriot side AEK Larnaca in August 2008 on a one-year loan from Slavia Prague, in a deal containing a second-year buy option. He went on to sign for FC Tescoma Zlín in the Czech 2. Liga on a six-month loan in January 2010.

In 2010, he was signed by SV Wehen Wiesbaden. In 2012, Abraham signed with FC Bohemians 1905.

== Honours ==
Mladá Boleslav

- Czech First League: 2005–06

Slavia Prague

- Czech First League: 2007–08
