= Marius Laux =

German footballer and team manager

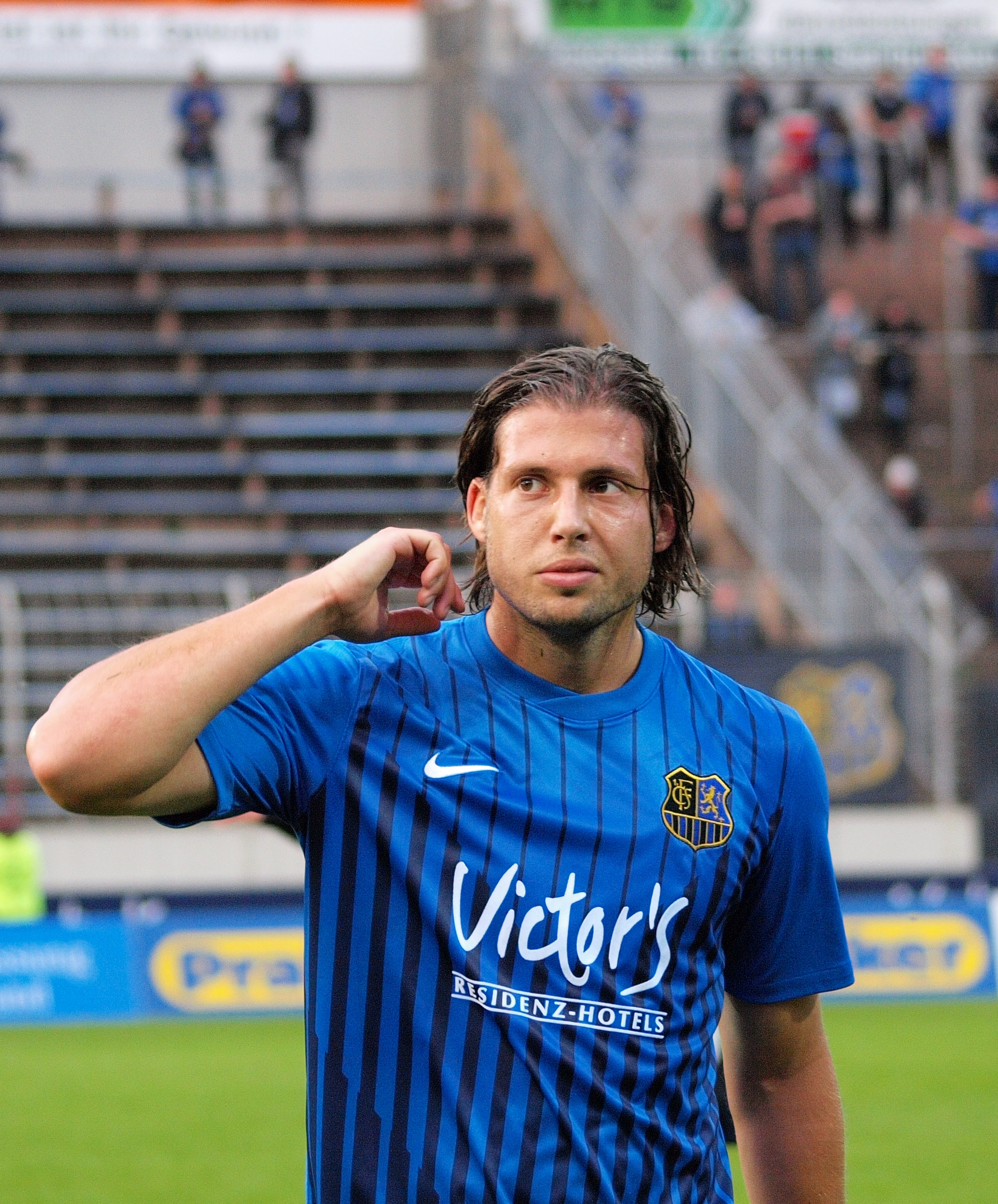
- Laux playing for 1. FC Saarbrücken

Personal information
- Date of birth: 7 February 1986 (age 40)
- Place of birth: Limburg an der Lahn, Hesse, West Germany
- Height: 1.88 m (6 ft 2 in)
- Position: Left winger

Youth career
- SC Offheim
- –2001: SV Wehen
- 2001–2004: 1. FC Köln

Senior career*
| Years | Team | Apps | (Gls) |
| 2004–2009 | 1. FC Köln II | 128 | (24) |
| 2009–2011 | Kickers Offenbach | 41 | (3) |
| 2011–2013 | 1. FC Saarbrücken | 69 | (16) |
| 2013–2021 | 1. FC Köln II | 257 | (34) |
- * Club domestic league appearances and goals as of 15:17, 7 February 2022 (UTC)

Marius Laux (born 7 February 1986) is a retired German footballer who last played for 1. FC Köln II. In December 2021, Laux ended his playing career and became the team manager of 1. FC Köln's senior team.
