= Elton da Costa =

Brazilian footballer (born 1979)

Personal information
- Full name: Elton da Costa Junior
- Date of birth: 15 December 1979 (age 46)
- Place of birth: Condor, Rio Grande do Sul, Brazil
- Height: 1.82 m (6 ft 0 in)
- Position: Midfielder

Youth career
- –1999: Inter-SM

Senior career*
Years	Team	Apps	(Gls)
1999–2000	FSV Frankfurt	29	(4)
2000–2003	Darmstadt 98	89	(22)
2003–2005	SpVgg Unterhaching	38	(3)
2005–2010	FC Augsburg	121	(22)
2010–2012	Kickers Offenbach	42	(12)
2012–2014	Darmstadt 98	60	(5)
2014–2015	1. FCA Darmstadt	0	(0)
2015–2017	FC 07 Bensheim	48	(23)
2017–2018	FC Kalbach	0	(0)
2018–2021	FC 07 Bensheim	56	(19)
2021–2023	1. FCA Darmstadt		

Managerial career
- 2017–2018: FC Kalbach
- 2018–2021: FC 07 Bensheim
- 2021–2023: 1. FCA Darmstadt
- * Club domestic league appearances and goals

Elton da Costa Jr. (born 15 December 1979) is a Brazilian football player and coach.

== 2013-14 2.Bundesliga play-off ==
The 2.Bundesliga Playoff's second leg between Arminia Bielefeld and Darmstadt 98 is what Elton da Costa is best known for. In the 120+2nd minute (the last minute of the game) he scored the goal to send Darmstadt to the 2nd Bundesliga.
