= Benjamin Baier =

German footballer (born 1988)

Personal information
- Date of birth: 23 July 1988 (age 38)
- Place of birth: Aschaffenburg, West Germany
- Height: 1.80 m (5 ft 11 in)
- Position: Midfielder

Team information
- Current team: Viktoria Aschaffenburg
- Number: 10

Youth career
- FSV Teutonia Obernau
- Viktoria Aschaffenburg
- –2007: Kickers Offenbach

Senior career*
Years	Team	Apps	(Gls)
2007–2010	Kickers Offenbach	32	(2)
2010–2011	RB Leipzig	21	(1)
2011–2014	SV Darmstadt 98	71	(4)
2014–2019	Rot-Weiss Essen	159	(31)
2019–	Viktoria Aschaffenburg	181	(35)
- * Club domestic league appearances and goals as of 28 June 2026

Benjamin Baier (born 23 July 1988) is a German footballer who plays as an attacking midfielder for Viktoria Aschaffenburg.

== Career ==
Baier began his career with Kickers Offenbach, making his debut in November 2007 as a substitute for Denis Epstein in a 2–1 defeat to SpVgg Greuther Fürth in the 2. Bundesliga. Offenbach were relegated at the end of the 2007–08 season, and Baier spent the following two years playing for the club in the 3. Liga, before joining RB Leipzig of the Regionalliga Nord in 2010. A year later he returned to the 3. Liga, and Hessen, to sign for SV Darmstadt 98. In the 2013–14 season Darmstadt finished in third place, and won promotion to the 2. Bundesliga after a dramatic win over Arminia Bielefeld in the playoff. Baier would leave the club at the end of the season, though, joining Regionalliga West side Rot-Weiss Essen.

On 16 June 2019, Viktoria Aschaffenburg announced that Baier had joined the club on a 2-year contract.

== Personal life ==
Baier's brother Daniel is a professional footballer, as was his father Jürgen.
