= Marco Sailer =

German footballer (born 1985)

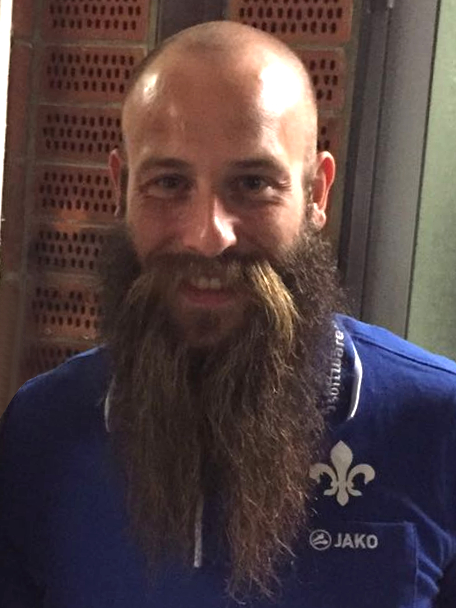
- Sailer in 2016

Personal information
- Date of birth: 16 November 1985 (age 40)
- Place of birth: Schwäbisch Hall, West Germany
- Height: 1.71 m (5 ft 7 in)
- Position: Forward

Youth career
- TSV Bitzfeld
- –03: VfR Heilbronn

Senior career*
Years	Team	Apps	(Gls)
2003–2004	FC Heilbronn		
2004–2009	VfR Aalen	132	(36)
2009–2010	Greuther Fürth	16	(2)
2010	Greuther Fürth II	2	(0)
2010–2011	SV Wehen Wiesbaden	34	(5)
2010–2011	SV Wehen Wiesbaden II	4	(0)
2012–2013	1. FC Heidenheim	34	(4)
2013–2016	Darmstadt 98	73	(4)
2016–2019	FSV Wacker 90 Nordhausen	26	(3)
2018–2019	FSV Wacker 90 Nordhausen II	14	(3)
- * Club domestic league appearances and goals

Marco Sailer (16 November 1985) is a German former professional footballer who played as a forward.

== Career ==
Sailer was born in Schwäbisch Hall. He learned his football at local club TSV Bitzfeld. Whilst still a teenager, he joined VfR Heilbronn. In 2004, he moved to VfR Aalen. In 2008, he celebrated promotion to the newly formed 3. Liga with the club. He scored the club's first goal in the new league on 26 July 2008 in a 2–1 victory. That season, Aalen were relegated to Regionalliga Süd and Sailer was released. He then joined Greuther Fürth and signed a two-year contract. After only one year, he left to join 3. Liga side SV Wehen Wiesbaden, and eighteen months later he moved on again, to 1. FC Heidenheim. After only 18 months at Heidenheim, Sailer joined Darmstadt 98 with whom he managed to get, through two successive promotions, into the Bundesliga. In 2016 Sailer moved to Regionalliga Nordost side FSV Wacker 90 Nordhausen.
