= Benjamin Gorka =

German footballer

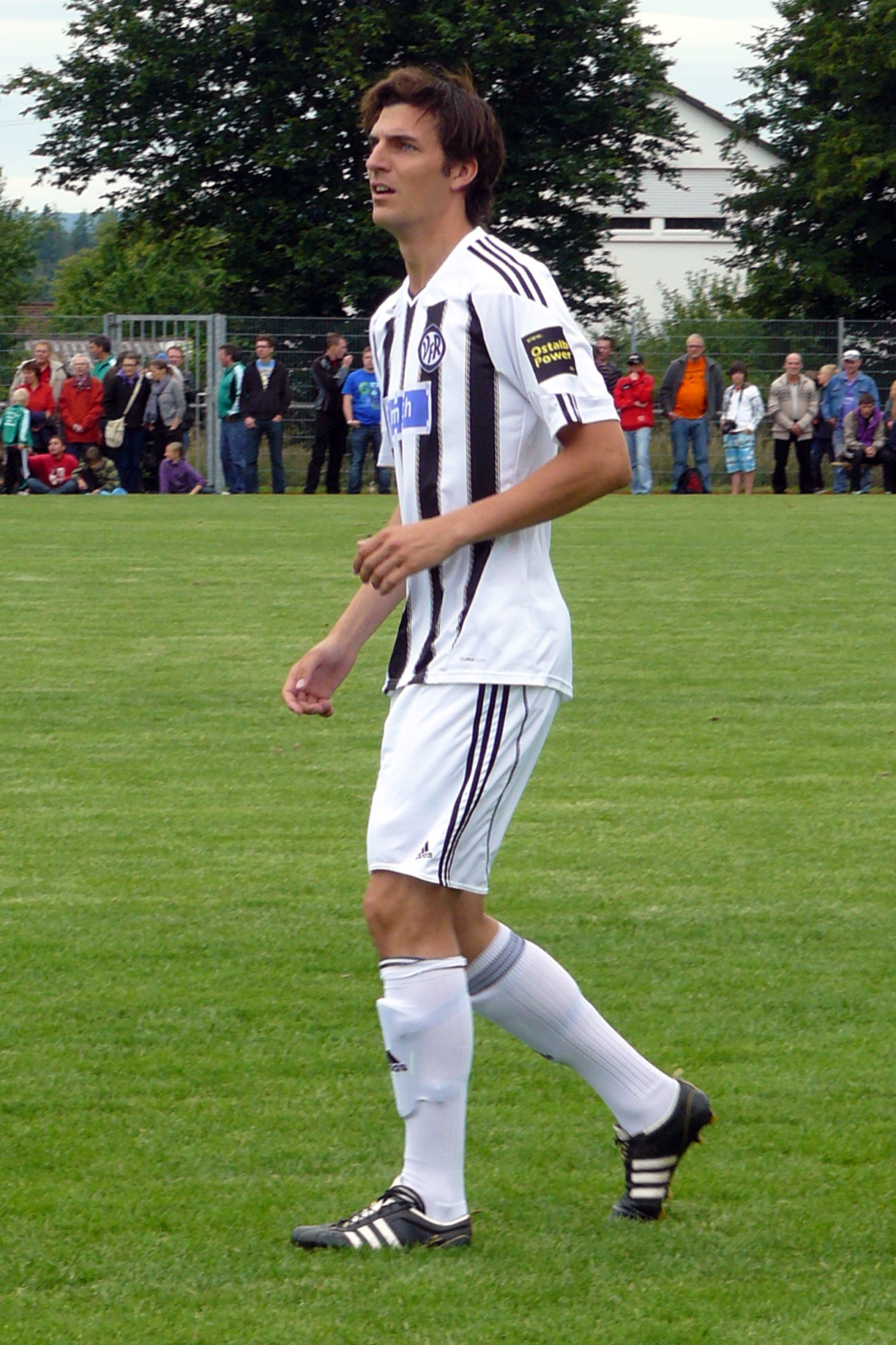
- Gorka playing for VfR Aalen

Personal information
- Date of birth: 15 April 1984 (age 42)
- Place of birth: Mannheim, West Germany
- Height: 1.95 m (6 ft 5 in)
- Position: Central defender

Youth career
- Ludwigshafener SC
- SV Waldhof Mannheim
- –2003: 1899 Hoffenheim
- 2003–2005: VfB Leimen

Senior career*
Years	Team	Apps	(Gls)
2005–2006	SV Sandhausen	21	(1)
2006–2007	SV Eintracht Trier 05	6	(0)
2007–2008	SGS Großaspach	18	(1)
2008–2009	Hamburger SV II	30	(2)
2009–2010	Wacker Burghausen	31	(4)
2010–2011	VfL Osnabrück	5	(0)
2011	VfR Aalen	2	(0)
2012–2017	SV Darmstadt 98	87	(2)
- * Club domestic league appearances and goals as of 14 July 2016 (UTC)

Benjamin Gorka (born 15 April 1984) is a German footballer who last played for SV Darmstadt 98 in the Bundesliga.
