= Merck-Stadion am Böllenfalltor =

Football stadium

- Böllenfalltor, Bölle

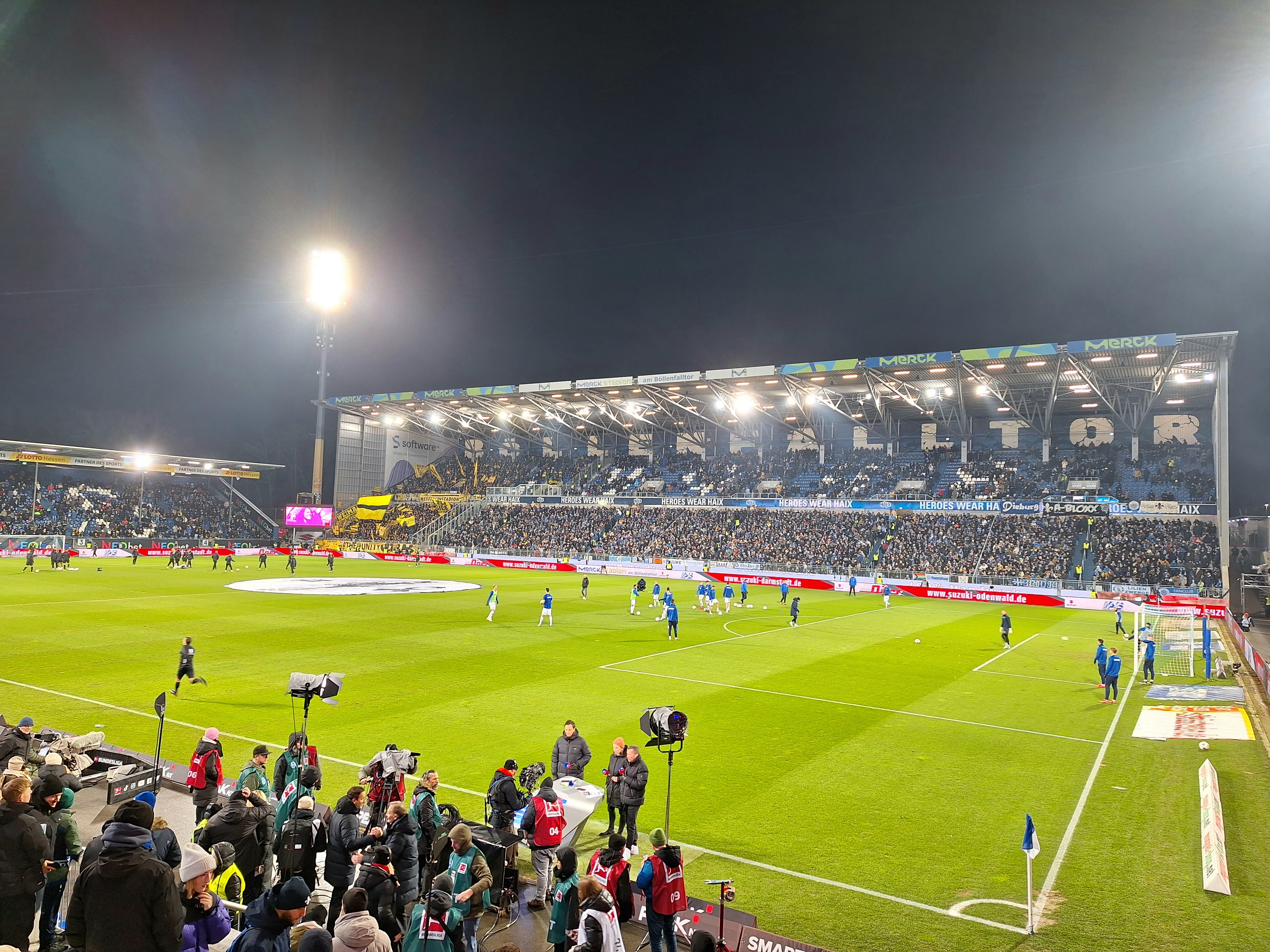
- View of the stadium in 2024.
- Interactive map of Merck-Stadion am Böllenfalltor
- Full name: Merck-Stadion am Böllenfalltor
- Former names: Stadion am Böllenfalltor (1921–2014); Jonathan-Heimes-Stadion am Böllenfalltor (2016–2017)
- Address: Nieder-Ramstädter Str. 170, 64285 Darmstadt
- Location: Darmstadt, Germany
- Coordinates: 49°51′28″N 8°40′20″E
- Owner: SV Darmstadt 98 Stadion GmbH
- Capacity: 17,810
- Surface: Grass

Construction
- Opened: 1921
- Renovated: 1950–1952, 1975, 1978, 1981, 2014, 2015, 2016, 2018–2023

Tenant
- SV Darmstadt 98

Website
- https://merckstadionamboellenfalltor.de

Merck-Stadion am Böllenfalltor (German pronunciation: [ˈʃtaːdi̯ɔn ʔam ˈbœlnfaltoːɐ̯]) is a football stadium in Darmstadt, Germany sponsored by Merck. It is the home of SV Darmstadt 98 in the 2. Bundesliga. The stadium has a maximum capacity of 17,810 after the renovation work in 2023.

== Panorama ==
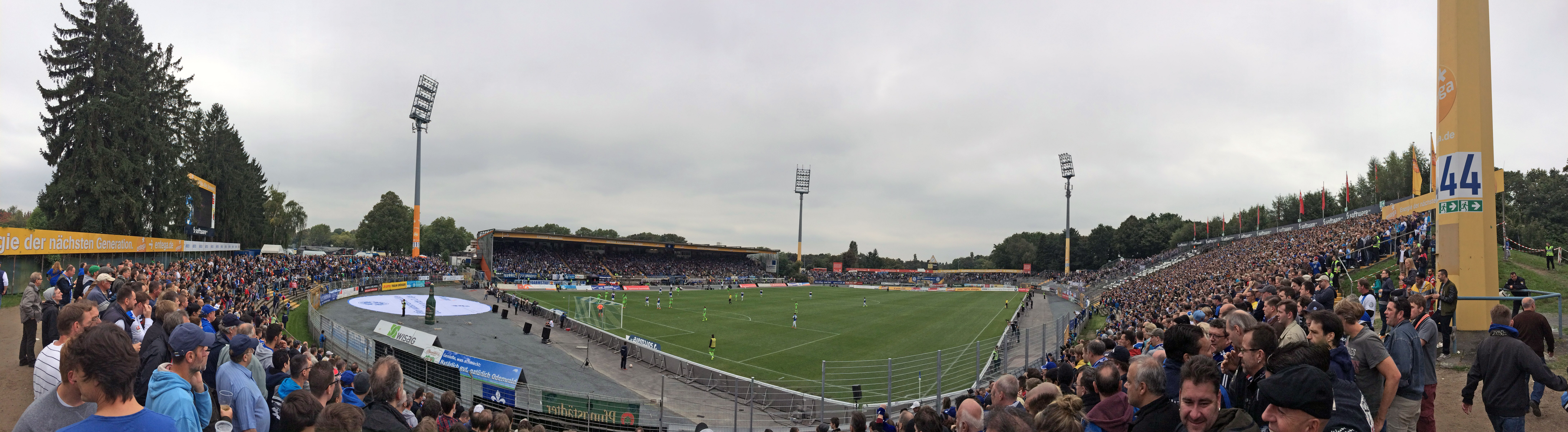
View from the South terrace on 14 September 2014 at the match between SV Darmstadt 98 and Erzgebirge Aue

== See also ==
- List of football stadiums in Germany
- Lists of stadiums
