= 2012–13 SV Wehen Wiesbaden season =

SV Wehen Wiesbaden
2012–13 season
- Stadium: BRITA-Arena, Wiesbaden, Germany
- 3. Liga: League starts on 21 July 2012.

The 2012–13 SV Wehen Wiesbaden season was the 88th season in the club's football history. In 2012–13 the club played in the 3. Liga, the third tier of German football. It was the club's fourth season in this league, having been relegated from the 2. Fußball-Bundesliga in 2009.

Wehen Wiesbaden finished seventh in the league table.

== Matches ==
=== Legend ===
Win Draw Loss Postponed

=== Friendly matches ===
6 July 2012	Jahn Regensburg	1–1	SV Wehen Wiesbaden	Lengfeld (Bad Abbach)
18:00 CEST	Laurito 3'	Report (in German)	Mintzel 9'

SV Wehen Wiesbaden	0–4	1. FSV Mainz 05
		Slišković; Noveski; Szalai

=== 3.Liga ===
21 July 2012 1	SV Wehen Wiesbaden	3–1	FC Rot-Weiß Erfurt	Wiesbaden
14:00 CET	Janjić 54', 71', 84' (pen.); Döringer (yellow card) 89'	Summary	Morabit 29'; Möhwald (yellow card) 43'; Öztürk (yellow card) 80'; Oumari (red card) 83'	Stadium: BRITA-Arena; Attendance: 3,500; Referee: Sacha Stegemann

28 July 2012 2	Stuttgarter Kickers	0–0	SV Wehen Wiesbaden	Stuttgart
14:00 CET	Braun (yellow card) 28'; Evers (yellow card) 74'	Summary	Gyasi (yellow card) 22'; Wiemann (yellow card) 32'; Book (yellow card) 62'; Müller (yellow card) 68'; Gurski (yellow card) 72'; Wohlfarth (yellow card) 74'	Stadium: Gazi-Stadion auf der Waldau; Attendance: 3,510; Referee: Florian Steuer

3 August 2012 3	SV Wehen Wiesbaden	0–2	SpVgg Unterhaching	Wiesbaden
19:00 CET	Bieler (yellow card) 71'	Summary	Schwabl (yellow card) 23'; Rohracker 80'; Odak (yellow card) 82'; Bigalke 89'	Stadium: BRITA-Arena; Attendance: 2,769; Referee: Sven Jablonski

7 August 2012 4	SV Babelsberg 03	2–2	SV Wehen Wiesbaden	Potsdam
19:00 CET	Hartmann (yellow card) 43'; Berzel (yellow card) 58'; Kreuels 74' (yellow card) 90+2'; Müller 79'	Summary	Mann 28', 32'; Zieba (yellow card) 42'; Janjić (yellow card) 51'; Müller (yellow card) 66'; Wohlfarth (yellow card) 85'	Stadium: Karl-Liebknecht-Stadion; Attendance: 2,442; Referee: Florian Steinberg

11 August 2012 5	SV Wehen Wiesbaden	2–2	SC Preußen Münster	Wiesbaden
14:00 CET	Engel 29', 69'; Mann (yellow card) 44'	Summary	Kühne (yellow card) 70' (yellow-red card) 82'; Königs (yellow card) 76'; Bischoff 88'; Schmidt 90+2'	Stadium: BRITA-Arena; Attendance: 2,780; Referee: Lothar Ostheimer

25 August 2012 6	Chemnitzer FC	3–2	SV Wehen Wiesbaden	Chemnitz
14:00 CET	Ayedemir 46', 86'; Fink 50'; Sträßer (yellow card) 60'; Pfeffer (yellow card) 65'; Stenzel (yellow card) 80'	Report	Gyasi (yellow card) 10'; Wiemann (yellow card) 25'; Mintzel 30'; Ivana 39'; Schimmel (yellow card) 70'; Müller (yellow card) 89'	Stadium: Stadion an der Gellertstraße; Attendance: 4,300; Referee: Soren Storks

29 August 2012 7	SV Wehen Wiesbaden	1–1	SV Darmstadt 98	Wiesbaden
19:00 CET	Gyasi (yellow card) 17'; Janjić 84'	Summary	Gorka 37'; Islamoglu (yellow card) 68'; Zimmerman (yellow card) 81'	Stadium: BRITA-Arena; Attendance: 4,569; Referee: Benjamin Cortus

1 September 2012 8	Hansa Rostock	1–1	SV Wehen Wiesbaden	Rostock
14:00 CET	Weilandt (yellow card) 60'; Plat 70'; Holst (yellow card) 82'; Jordanov (yellow card) 90'	Summary	Janjić 38' (pen.); Wiemann (yellow card) 47'; Wohlfarth (yellow card) 90'	Stadium: DKB-Arena; Attendance: 6,300; Referee: Tim Sönder

15 September 2012 9	SV Wacker Burghausen	0–0	SV Wehen Wiesbaden	Burghausen
14:00 CET	Schick (yellow card) 26'; Cinar (yellow card) 68'	Summary	Mintzel (yellow card) 28'; Gyasi (yellow card) 29'; Wiemann (yellow card) 75' (yellow-red card) 84'; Herzig (yellow card) 78'	Stadium: Wacker-Arena; Attendance: 2,300; Referee: Robert Kampka

21 September 2012 10	SV Wehen Wiesbaden	1–1	1. FC Heidenheim	Wiesbaden
19:00 CET	Janjić (red card) 36'; Mintzel 90+2'	[uk.soccerway.com/matches/2012/09/21/germany/3-liga/sv-wehen-1926-taunusstein-ev/1-fc-heidenheim-1846/1306727/ Summary]	Krebs (yellow card) 30'; Michael Deutsche (yellow card) 43'; Schnatterer 56' (pen.)	Stadium: BRITA-Arena; Attendance: 3,956; Referee: Thorben Siewer

25 September 2012 11	Hallescher FC	1–1	SV Wehen Wiesbaden	Halle, Saxony-Anhalt
19:00 CET	Wagefeld 52'	Summary	Mintzel (yellow card) 50'; Christ 58'	Stadium: Erdgas Sportpark; Attendance: 6,422; Referee: Marcel Göpferich

29 September 2012 12	SV Wehen Wiesbaden	0–0	VfB Stuttgart II	Wiesbaden
14:00 CET	Herzig (yellow card) 16'	Summary		Stadium: BRITA-Arena; Attendance: 2,903; Referee: Karl Valentin

5 October 2012 13	VfL Osnabrück	2–2	SV Wehen Wiesbaden	Osnabrück
19:00 CET	Manno 26'; Riemann (yellow card) 67'; Nagy (yellow card) 82'; Beermann 90'	Summary	Wohlfarth 34'; Christ 62' (pen.); Gurski (yellow card) 76'; Schimmel (yellow card) 82'	Stadium: Osnatel-Arena; Attendance: 9,700; Referee: Patrick Alt

20 October 2012 14	SV Wehen Wiesbaden	0–1	Arminia Bielefeld	Wiesbaden
14:00 CET	Bieler (yellow card) 76'; Zieba (yellow card) 78'	Summary	Rahn 8'	Stadium: BRITA-Arena; Attendance: 2,963; Referee: Timo Gerach

27 October 2012 15	Alemannia Aachen	1–1	SV Wehen Wiesbaden	Aachen
14:00 CET	Schwertfeger 81'	Summary	Mintzel (yellow card) 20'; Ivana 67'	Stadium: New Tivoli; Attendance: 11,543; Referee: Markus Schmidt

3 November 2012 16	SV Wehen Wiesbaden	3–1	Borussia Dortmund II	Wiesbaden
14:00 CET	Gyasi (yellow card) 16'; Janjić 43' (pen.); Ivana 49'; Wohlfarth 78'; Wiemann (yellow card) 90'	Summary	Terzić (yellow card) 18'; Tim Kübel 29'; Hübner (yellow card) 54'; Günter (yellow card) 77'; Hofmann (yellow card) 82'; Hornschuh (yellow card) 90'	Stadium: BRITA-Arena; Attendance: 2,372; Referee: Martin Petersen

10 November 2012 17	1. FC Saarbrücken	3–3	SV Wehen Wiesbaden	Saarbrücken
14:00 CET	Pazurek (yellow card) 19'; Sökler 22'; Ziemer 27'; Kruse 74'; Kohler (yellow card) 89'	Summary	Janjić 3'; Vunguidica 17'; Gyasi (yellow card) 35'; Herzig 45'; Bieler (yellow card) 89'	Stadium: Ludwigsparkstadion; Attendance: 3,182; Referee: Florian Steinberg

17 November 2012 18	SV Wehen Wiesbaden	2–1	Kickers Offenbach	Wiesbaden
14:00 CET	Ivana 21', 34' (yellow card) 26'; Döringer (yellow card) 55'; Wiemann (yellow card) 69'; Herzig (yellow card) 73'	Summary	Feldhahn (yellow card) 47'; Rathgeber 56' (pen.); Vogler (yellow card) 82'	Stadium: BRITA-Arena; Attendance: 5,834; Referee: Christian Dietz

24 November 2012 19	Karlsruher SC	4–0	SV Wehen Wiesbaden	Karlsruhe
14:00 CET	Gordon (yellow card) 6' (goal) 50'; Mauersberger 8' van der Biezen 59'; Hennings 68'	Summary	Christ (yellow card) 2'; Herzig (yellow card) 52'; Wohlfarth (yellow card) 72'	Stadium: Wildparkstadion; Attendance: 10,970; Referee: Sebastian Schmickartz

1 December 2012 20	FC Rot-Weiß Erfurt	2–2	SV Wehen Wiesbaden	Erfurt
14:00 CET	Ströhl 19' (yellow card) 65'; Engelhardt (yellow card) 23'; Pfingsten-Reddig 74' (pen.); Kopilas (yellow card) 90+2'	Summary	Janjić 11', 78' (pen.); Herzig (yellow card) 51'; Ivana (yellow card) 66'	Stadium: Steigerwaldstadion; Attendance: 4,627; Referee: Thorben Siewer

26 January 2013 21	SV Wehen Wiesbaden	1–0	SV Babelsberg 03	Wiesbaden
14:00 CET	Janjić 12'; Ivana (yellow card) 54'; Mintzel (yellow card) 90+1'	Summary	Kühne (yellow card) 42'	Stadium: BRITA-Arena; Attendance: 2,217; Referee: Florian Steuer

30 January 2013 22	SV Wehen Wiesbaden	0–2	Stuttgarter Kickers	Wiesbaden
19:00 CET		Summary	Braun 39'; Savranlıoğlu 78'	Stadium: BRITA-Arena

2 February 2013 23	SC Preußen Münster	0–0	SV Wehen Wiesbaden	Münster
14:00 CET	Königs (yellow card) 17'; Köz (yellow card) 47'	Summary	Bieler (yellow card) 11'; Mann (yellow card) 21'; Ivana (yellow card) 39'; Stroh-Engel (yellow card) 59'; Wiemann (yellow card) 62'; Christ (yellow card) 72'	Stadium: Preußenstadion; Attendance: 7,047; Referee: Rene Rohde

8 February 2013 24	SV Wehen Wiesbaden	0–0	Chemnitzer FC	Wiesbaden
18:30 CET	Wiemann (yellow card) 32'; Herzig (yellow card) 51'	Summary		Stadium: BRITA-Arena; Attendance: 2,153; Referee: Patrick Alt

12 February 2013 25	SpVgg Unterhaching	0–2	SV Wehen Wiesbaden	Unterhaching
18:30 CET	Schweinsteiger (yellow card) 45'; Moll (yellow card) 75'	Summary	Müller 8'; Janjić 10'; Döringer (yellow card) 80'	Stadium: Generali Sportpark; Attendance: 800; Referee: Sven Jablonski

17 February 2013 26	SV Darmstadt 98	1–0	SV Wehen Wiesbaden	Darmstadt
14:00 CET	Latza (yellow card) 53'; Elton da Costa 62'; Zimmerman (yellow card) 77'; Zimmermann (yellow card) 88'; Hesse (red card) 90'	Summary	Stroh-Engel (yellow card) 16'; Mann (yellow card) 18'; Herzig (yellow card) 77'	Stadium: Stadion am Böllenfalltor; Attendance: 3,800; Referee: Christian Fischer

22 February 2013 27	SV Wehen Wiesbaden	2–1	Hansa Rostock	Wiesbaden
18:30 CET	Herzig (yellow card) 23'; Vunguidica 25'; Janjić 80'	Summary	Grupe (yellow card) 8'; Plat 38'; Rilke (yellow card) 72'	Stadium: BRITA-Arena; Attendance: 2,500; Referee: Marcel Göpferich

2 March 2013 28	SV Wehen Wiesbaden	1–1	SV Wacker Burghausen	Wiesbaden
14:00 CET	Schimmel (yellow card) 58'; Stroh-Engel 70'; Zieba (yellow card) 90+1'	Summary	Holz 3'; Burkhard (yellow card) 30' (yellow-red card); Cinar (yellow card) 64'; Thiel (yellow card) 78'	Stadium: BRITA-Arena; Attendance: 2,104; Referee: Aarne Aarnink

9 March 2013 29	1. FC Heidenheim	2–2	SV Wehen Wiesbaden	Heidenheim
14:00 CET	Wittek (yellow card) 18'; Malura (yellow card) 28'; Schnatterer (yellow card) 54' (goal) 90'; Thurk (yellow card) 73'; Göhlert 82'	Summary	Janjić 10'; Herzig (yellow card) 30'; Zieba 72'; Christ (yellow card) 73'	Stadium: Voith-Arena; Attendance: 6,800; Referee: Timo Gerach

31 March 2013 31	VfB Stuttgart II	1–1	SV Wehen Wiesbaden	Stuttgart
14:00 CET	Vitzthum (yellow card) 25' (goal) 49'; Hemlein (yellow card) 52'	Summary	Vunguidica 31'; Müller (yellow card) 42'; Wiemann (yellow card) 54'; Schimmel (yellow card) 86'	Stadium: Gazi-Stadion auf der Waldau; Attendance: 370; Referee: (Germany) Norbert Giese

3 April 2013 30	SV Wehen Wiesbaden	2–0	Hallescher FC	Wiesbaden
19:00 CET	Mintzel (yellow card) 31' (goal) 43', 47'; Christ (yellow card) 72'; Book (yellow card) 90'	Summary	Hartmann (yellow card) 61'	Stadium: BRITA-Arena; Attendance: 2,237; Referee: (Germany) Florian Steinberg

6 April 2013 32	SV Wehen Wiesbaden	3–2	VfL Osnabrück	Wiesbaden
14:00 CET	Ivana 45'; Schimmel (yellow card) 65'; Janjić 67'; Vunguidica 85'	Summary	Beermann 4'; Pisot (yellow card) 32'; Krük (yellow card) 38'; Zoller 70'; Manno (yellow card) 90+2'	Stadium: BRITA-Arena; Attendance: 3,059; Referee: (Germany) Karl Valentin

13 April 2013 33	Arminia Bielefeld	3–1	SV Wehen Wiesbaden	Bielefeld
14:00 CET	Klos 45'; Lorenz (yellow card) 65'; Schönfeld 71'; Rahn 76'	Summary	Döringer 9'; Zieba (yellow card) 80'	Stadium: Bielefelder Alm; Attendance: 10,339; Referee: (Germany) René Rohde

19 April 2013 34	SV Wehen Wiesbaden	3–2	Alemannia Aachen	Wiesbaden
19:00 CET	Mintzel 21'; Zieba 27'; Schimmel (yellow card) 44'; Wiemann (yellow card) 63'; Müller 75' (yellow card) 90'	Summary	Thiele 31'; Marquet 90+2'	Stadium: BRITA-Arena; Attendance: 3,014; Referee: (Germany) Martin Petersen

27 April 2013 35	Borussia Dortmund II	1–2	SV Wehen Wiesbaden	Dortmund
14:00 CET	Benatelli 9'; Bakalorz (yellow card) 31'; Hübner (yellow card) 41'	Summary	Vunguidica 12'; Janjić 25'; Herzig (yellow card) 52'; Mann (yellow card) 62'	Stadium: Stadion Rote Erde; Attendance: 1,009; Referee: (Germany) Thomas Stein

3 May 2013 36	SV Wehen Wiesbaden	3–1	1. FC Saarbrücken	Wiesbaden
19:00 CET	Zieba 15'; Christ (yellow card) 38'; Mintzel 72'; Vunguidica 78'	Summary	Stiefler 2'; Sökler (yellow card) 41'	Stadium: BRITA-Arena; Attendance: 3,758; Referee: (Germany) Timo Gerach

11 May 2013 37	Kickers Offenbach	1–0	SV Wehen Wiesbaden	Offenbach am Main
13:30 CET	Schwarz 62'; Fetsch (yellow card) 69'	Summary	Markus Kolke (yellow card) 47'	Stadium: Sparda Bank Hessen Stadium; Attendance: 6,310; Referee: (Germany) Frank Willenborg

18 May 2013 38	SV Wehen Wiesbaden	2–4	Karlsruher SC	Wiesbaden
13:30 CET	Vunguidica (yellow card) 59' (goal) 84'; Bieler 86'	Summary	Kempe 13'; Peitz 18'; Çalhanoğlu 20'; Kern 72'; Alibaz (yellow card) 88'	Stadium: BRITA-Arena; Attendance: 8,947; Referee: (Germany) Patrick Alt
