= 2012–13 VfL Osnabrück season =

VfL Osnabrück
2012–13 season
- Chairman: Dirk Rasch
- Manager: Claus-Dieter Wollitz
- Stadium: Osnatel-Arena, Osnabrück, Germany
- 3. Liga: 3rd
- Lower Saxony Cup: Winner
- Top goalscorer: League: Simon Zoller (15); All: Simon Zoller (16)
- Highest home attendance: 16,000 vs. Arminia Bielefeld, 17 November 2012
- Lowest home attendance: 7,700 vs. SV Babelsberg 03, 23 February 2013
- Average home league attendance: 10,631

The 2012–13 VfL Osnabrück season was the 114th season in the club's football history. In 2012–13 the club played in the 3. Liga, the third tier of German football. It was the club's second consecutive season in this league, having been relegated from the 2. Bundesliga in 2011.

The club also took part in the 2012–13 edition of the Lower Saxony Cup, having reached the quarter-finals against fourth division side TSV Havelse after a 3–2 win over SV Meppen. In the quarter-finals, they won against TSV Havelse 6–5 by penalties to reach the semi-finals.

They finished the 2012–13 season in third position, gaining the spot to play in the 2. Bundesliga relegation playoff game. They faced Dynamo Dresden but lost in the away leg, making the aggregate score of 1–2, thus making them still in the 3. Liga.

== Matches ==
=== Legend ===
Win Draw Loss Postponed

=== Friendly matches ===
16 June 2012	SF Lechtingen	0–6	VfL Osnabrück	Lechtingen
16:00		Report	4', 40' Hudec; 10' Nieweler; 52', 72' Zoller; 89' Pauli	Stadium: Anlage an der Osnabrücker Straße; Attendance: 1.000

23 June 2012	TuS Borgloh	0–10	VfL Osnabrück	Borgloch
14:00		Report	13' Ferfelis; 33' Neidhart; 65' Wegkamp; 69', 82' Manno; 76', 79', 85', 89' Piossek; 90' Krük	Stadium: Sportplatz An der Schulstraße; Attendance: 800

26 June 2012	Preußen Lengerich	0–13	VfL Osnabrück	Lengerich
18:30		Report	19', 23', 29' Nieweler; 54', 82' Wegkamp; 56' Zoller; 59', 68' Glockner; 66' Piossek; 70', 83' Neidhart; 76' Krük; 90' Staffeldt	Stadium: Stadion an der Münsterstraße; Attendance: 1.000

30 June 2012	VfL Osnabrück	3–1	SV Wilhelmshaven	Osnabrück
17:00	Nagy 13'; Zoller 32'; Thiel 88'	Report	72' Franziskus	Stadium: Stadion Illoshöhe; Attendance: 1.000

4 July 2012	VfL Osnabrück	2–1	BV Cloppenburg	Bramsche
19:00	Beermann 40'; Piossek 89'	Report	45' Wernke	Stadium: Sportplatz Hesepe; Attendance: 700

6 July 2012	SF Lotte	3–1	VfL Osnabrück	Lotte
19:00	Menga 25'; Shapourzadeh 52'; Radke 60'	Report	45' Manno	Stadium: connectM-Arena; Attendance: 2.100

11 July 2012	FC Schalke 04 II	1–0	VfL Osnabrück	Billerbeck
18:30	Türpitz 37'	Report		Stadium: Sportzentrums am Helker Berg; Attendance: 220

14 July 2012	VfL Osnabrück	3–1	VfL Bochum	Osnabrück
15:30	Staffeldt 21'; Nagy 53'; Glockner 77'	Report	36' Dedic	Stadium: Osnatel-Arena; Attendance: 2.500; Referee: Arne Aarnink (Nordhorn)

14 August 2012	Hannover 96	1–0	VfL Osnabrück	Ilten
18:00	Hauger 66'	Report		Stadium: Wahre-Dorff-Arena; Attendance: 2.400

=== 3. Liga ===
21 July 2012 1	VfL Osnabrück	2–0	Borussia Dortmund II	Osnabrück
14:00	Manno 41'; Zoller 71'	Report		Stadium: Osnatel-Arena; Attendance: 11.700; Referee: Daniel Siebert

28 July 2012 2	1. FC Saarbrücken	0–1	VfL Osnabrück	Saarbrücken
14:00		Report	47' Thomik	Stadium: Ludwigsparkstadion; Attendance: 5.682; Referee: Christian Leicher

5 August 2012 3	VfL Osnabrück	2–0	Kickers Offenbach	Osnabrück
14:00	Staffeldt 30'; Zoller 39'	Report		Stadium: Osnatel-Arena; Attendance: 11.000; Referee: Christian Fischer

8 August 2012 4	Karlsruher SC	1–1	VfL Osnabrück	Karlsruhe
19:00	Çalhanoğlu 25'	Report	49' Zoller	Stadium: Wildparkstadion; Referee: Sasha Stegemann

11 August 2012 5	VfL Osnabrück	1–0	Kickers Offenbach	Osnabrück
14:00	Costa 49'	Report		Stadium: Osnatel-Arena; Attendance: 9.500; Referee: Benjamin Brand

25 August 2012 6	Stuttgarter Kickers	3–0	VfL Osnabrück	Stuttgart
19:00	Grüttner 22'; Fennell 33'; Rühle 86'	Report		Stadium: Gazi-Stadion auf der Waldau; Attendance: 3.700; Referee: Christian Bandurski

28 August 2012 7	VfL Osnabrück	3–0	SpVgg Unterhaching	Osnabrück
19:00	Zoller 25'; Glockner 45'; Hudec 84'	Report		Stadium: Osnatel-Arena; Attendance: 11.400; Referee: Florian Steuer

1 September 2012 8	SV Babelsberg 03	1–0	VfL Osnabrück	Babelsberg
14:00	Kreuels 45'	Report		Stadium: Karl-Liebknecht-Stadion; Attendance: 2.482; Referee: Christian Dingert

15 September 2012 9	VfL Osnabrück	0–2	Preußen Münster	Osnabrück
14:00		Report	43' Bischoff; 90' Nazarov	Stadium: Osnatel-Arena; Attendance: 15.000; Referee: Günter Perl

22 September 2012 10	Chemnitzer FC	0–2	VfL Osnabrück	Chemnitz
14:00		Report	54' Nagy; 90+4' Staffeldt	Stadium: Stadion an der Gellertstraße; Attendance: 4.100; Referee: Martin Petersen

26 September 2012 11	VfL Osnabrück	1–0	SV Darmstadt 98	Osnabrück
19:00	Piossek 86'	Report		Stadium: Osnatel-Arena; Attendance: 7.700; Referee: Norbert Grudzinski

29 September 2012 12	Hansa Rostock	0–3	VfL Osnabrück	Rostock
13:30		Report	52' 70' Piossek; 65' Grimaldi	Stadium: DKB-Arena; Attendance: 8.500; Referee: Benjamin Brand

5 October 2012 13	VfL Osnabrück	2–2	SV Wehen Wiesbaden	Osnabrück
19:00	Manno 26'; Beermann 90+4'	Report	34' Wohlfarth; 62' Christ	Stadium: Osnatel-Arena; Attendance: 9.700; Referee: Patrick Alt

20 October 2012 14	1. FC Heidenheim	1–3	VfL Osnabrück	Heidenheim
14:00	Malura 79' (yellow card) 83'	Summary	Beermann 17'; Pisot (yellow card) 58'; Krük (yellow card) 64'; Staffeldt 80' (pen.) (yellow card) 82'; Grimaldi 90'	Stadium: Voith-Arena; Attendance: 8,500; Referee: Bastian Dankert

27 October 2012 15	VfL Osnabrück	2–0	Hallescher FC	Osnabrück
14:00	Manno 68'; Neumann 78'	Summary	Hauk (yellow card) 75'	Stadium: Osnatel-Arena; Attendance: 9,000; Referee: Malte Dittrich

3 November 2012 16	VfB Stuttgart II	1–2	VfL Osnabrück	Stuttgart
14:00	Benyamina 31'; Khedira (yellow card) 64'	Summary	Nagy 60'; Manno (yellow card) 65'	Stadium: Gazi-Stadion auf der Waldau; Attendance: 520; Referee: Benjamin Cortus

10 November 2012 17	SV Wacker Burghausen	1–1	VfL Osnabrück	Burghausen, Altötting
14:00	Omodiagbe (yellow card) 52'; Thiel 63'	Summary	Zoller 45'; Fischer (yellow card) 62'	Stadium: Wacker-Arena; Attendance: 2,460; Referee: Knut Kircher

17 November 2012 18	VfL Osnabrück	0–0	Arminia Bielefeld	Osnabrück
14:00		Report		Stadium: Osnatel-Arena; Attendance: 16,000; Referee: Felix Zwayer

24 November 2012 19	Alemannia Aachen	0–1	VfL Osnabrück	Aachen
14:00		Report	Glockner 79'	Stadium: New Tivoli; Attendance: 12,031; Referee: Wolfgang Stark

1 December 2012 20	Borussia Dortmund II	1–1	VfL Osnabrück	Dortmund
14:00	Hübner 72'	Report	Costa 55'	Stadium: Stadion Rote Erde; Attendance: 2,809; Referee: Dr. Manuel Kunzmann

8 December 2012 21	VfL Osnabrück	3–0	1. FC Saarbrücken	Osnabrück
14:00	Zoller 49'; Beermann 51'; Neumann 53'	Report		Stadium: Osnatel-Arena; Attendance: 8,600; Referee: Christian Dingert

15 December 2012 22	Kickers Offenbach	1–5	VfL Osnabrück	Offenbach am Main
14:00	Fetsch 24'	Report	Manno 22', 75'; Piossek 36'; Zoller 87'; Thiel 89'	Stadium: Sparda Bank Hessen Stadium; Attendance: 4,703; Referee: Robert Hartmann

26 January 2013 23	VfL Osnabrück	2–3	Karlsruher SC	Osnabrück
14:00	Manno 63'; Pisot 83'	Report	Çalhanoğlu 29', 34'; Akpoguma 54'	Stadium: Osnatel-Arena; Attendance: 11,400; Referee: Guido Winkmann

2 February 2013 24	Rot-Weiß Erfurt	2–1	VfL Osnabrück	Erfurt
14:00	Pfingsten-Reddig 8'; Engelhardt 77'	Report	Costa 2'	Stadium: Steigerwaldstadion; Attendance: 4,037; Referee: Dr. Manuel Kunzmann

10 February 2013 25	VfL Osnabrück	3–1	Stuttgarter Kickers	Osnabrück
14:00	Staffeldt 11'; Nagy 34'; Zoller 63'	Report	Leist 24'	Stadium: Osnatel-Arena; Attendance: 10,000; Referee: Eduard Beitinger

16 February 2013 26	SpVgg Unterhaching	0–2	VfL Osnabrück	Unterhaching
14:00		Report	Piossek 15'; Zoller 22'	Stadium: Stadion am Sportpark; Attendance: 1,450; Referee: Timo Gerach

23 February 2013 27	VfL Osnabrück	1–0	SV Babelsberg 03	Osnabrück
14:00	Manno 52'	Report		Stadium: Osnatel-Arena; Attendance: 7,700; Referee: Rene Rohde

2 March 2013 28	Preußen Münster	3–1	VfL Osnabrück	Münster
14:00	Kara 12', 19', 26'	Report	Zoller 39'	Stadium: Preußenstadion; Attendance: 15,050; Referee: Christian Dingert

8 March 2013 29	VfL Osnabrück	2–2	Chemnitzer FC	Osnabrück
19:00	Pisot 45+3'; Zoller 52'	Report	Fink 26'; Förster 87'	Stadium: Osnatel-Arena; Attendance: 9,700; Referee: Arno Blos

16 March 2013 30	SV Darmstadt 98	1–0	VfL Osnabrück	Darmstadt
14:00	Zimmerman 55'	Report		Stadium: Stadion am Böllenfalltor; Attendance: 4,800; Referee: Günter Perl

30 March 2013 31	VfL Osnabrück	3–2	Hansa Rostock	Osnabrück
14:00	Jula 69', 90+2'; Staffeldt 71'	Report	Mendy 16'; Beermann 61' (o.g.)	Stadium: Osnatel-Arena; Attendance: 10,800; Referee: Christian Dietz

6 April 2013 32	SV Wehen Wiesbaden	3–2	VfL Osnabrück	Wiesbaden
14:00	Ivana 45'; Janjic 67'; Vunguidica 85'	Report	Beermann 4'; Zoller 69'	Stadium: Brita-Arena; Attendance: 3,059; Referee: Karl Valentin

13 April 2013 33	VfL Osnabrück	2–2	1. FC Heidenheim	Osnabrück
14:00	Zoller 19'; Staffeldt 68'	Report	Schnatterer 44'; Kraus 90+1'	Stadium: Osnatel-Arena; Attendance: 9,600; Referee: Peter Sippel

20 April 2013 34	Hallescher FC	1–2	VfL Osnabrück	Halle
14:00	Ivana 45'	Report	Staffeldt 43'; Zoller 63'	Stadium: Erdgas-Sportpark; Attendance: 6,406; Referee: Daniel Siebert

27 April 2013 35	VfL Osnabrück	2–0	VfB Stuttgart II	Osnabrück
14:00	Zoller 35'; Piossek 73'	Report		Stadium: Osnatel-Arena; Attendance: 9,200; Referee: Sören Storks

4 May 2013 36	VfL Osnabrück	1–0	SV Wacker Burghausen	Osnabrück
14:00	Staffeldt 61'	Report		Stadium: Osnatel-Arena; Attendance: 10,100; Referee: Tobias Stieler

11 May 2013 37	Arminia Bielefeld	1–0	VfL Osnabrück	Bielefeld
13:30	Hille 56'	Report		Stadium: Schüco-Arena; Attendance: 26,500; Referee: Wolfgang Stark

18 May 2013 38	VfL Osnabrück	4–0	Alemannia Aachen	Osnabrück
13:30	Piossek 10', 38'; Costa 49'; Staffeldt 86'	Report		Stadium: Osnatel-Arena; Attendance: 13,900; Referee: Markus Wingenbach

=== 2. Bundesliga Relegation Playoff ===
24 May 2013 1st Leg	VfL Osnabrück	1–0	Dynamo Dresden	Osnabrück
20:30	Manno 43'	Report		Stadium: Osnatel-Arena; Attendance: 15,500; Referee: Günter Perl

28 May 2013 2nd Leg	Dynamo Dresden	2–0	VfL Osnabrück	Dresden
20:30	Fiel 30'; Ouali 71'	Report		Stadium: Glücksgas Stadium; Attendance: 29,253; Referee: Peter Gagelmann

=== Lower Saxony Cup ===
5 September 2012 Eight-finals	SV Meppen	2–3	VfL Osnabrück	Meppen
19:00	Gerdes-Wurpts 20', 45'	Report	5' Nagy; 45' Bouma; 85' Manno	Stadium: MEP-Arena; Attendance: 5.000; Referee: Axel Martin

24 March 2013 Quarter-finals	TSV Havelse	2–2 (a.e.t.) (3–4 p)	VfL Osnabrück	Garbsen
14:00	Wendel 55'; Hintzkel 74'	Report	77' Nagy; 85' Zoller	Stadium: A-Platz; Attendance: 1.332; Referee: Hauke-Jörn Rüther
	Penalties
	Vucinovic (penalty scored); Posipal (penalty scored); Deppe (penalty scored)		(penalty scored) Bouma; (penalty scored) Pisot; (penalty scored) Staffeldt; (penalty scored) Beermann

16 April 2013 Semi-finals	BSV SW Rehden	0–2	VfL Osnabrück	Rehden
19:00		Report	44' Piossek; 47' Jula	Stadium: A-Platz; Attendance: 1,800; Referee: Tobias Helwig

30 May 2013 Final	SV Wilhelmshaven	2–4	VfL Osnabrück	Wilhelmshaven
19:00	Papaefthimiou 12'; Jahdadic 29'	Report	28' Kodes; 45' Neidhart; 53' Stehr; 90' Balzis	Stadium: Jadestadion; Attendance: 325; Referee: Stefan Haupt
