= 2011–12 3. Liga =

4th season of the 3. Liga

3. Liga
- Season: 2011–12
- Promoted: SV Sandhausen; VfR Aalen; Jahn Regensburg
- Relegated: Rot-Weiß Oberhausen; Carl Zeiss Jena; Werder Bremen II
- Matches: 380
- Goals: 956 (2.52 per match)
- Top goalscorer: Marcel Reichwein (17 goals)
- Biggest home win: U'haching 6–0 CZ Jena
- Biggest away win: W. Bremen II 0–4 K. Offenbach; A. Bielefeld 0–4 Saarbrücken; W. Bremen II 0–4 Aalen; Wehen 0–4 Sandhausen; W. Bremen II 0–4 Darmstadt; Aalen 0–4 Osnabrück
- Highest scoring: CZ Jena 4–3 A. Bielefeld; Saarbrücken 5–2 RW Oberhausen; Stuttgart II 2–5 A. Bielefeld

The 2011–12 3. Liga was the fourth season of the 3. Liga, Germany's third tier of its football league system. The season commenced on 22 July 2011, two weeks earlier than the 2011–12 Bundesliga season and one week after the 2011–12 2. Bundesliga season, and ended with the last games on 5 May 2012. The traditional winter break was held between the weekends around 18 December 2011 and 22 January 2012.

The league comprises fourteen teams from the 2010–11 season, the last two teams from the 2010–11 2. Bundesliga, the losers of the promotion play-off between the 16th-placed 2. Bundesliga team and the third-placed 3. Liga team as well as the three champions of the three 2010–11 Regionalliga divisions.

== Teams ==
Eintracht Braunschweig as 2010–11 champions and runners-up Hansa Rostock were directly promoted to the 2011–12 2. Bundesliga. Braunschweig, who were a member of the league since the inaugural season, will return to the 2. Bundesliga after a total of four seasons in the third tier of the German football pyramid, while Rostock only had a cameo appearance in the league.

The two promoted teams will be replaced by the two worst-placed teams of the 2010–11 2. Bundesliga season, Rot-Weiß Oberhausen and Arminia Bielefeld. Pending license approvals (see below), both clubs will make their debut in the league; Oberhausen will drop to the third level after three years, while Arminia will return to the third tier after sixteen seasons.

On the other end of the table, Bayern Munich II were relegated to their respective 2011–12 Fußball-Regionalliga divisions after finishing the 2010–11 season at the bottom of the table, thus ending a run which saw them being part of a German third-tier league since 1973. Wacker Burghausen and Werder Bremen II, who were originally going to be relegated as well, were eventually spared as Rot Weiss Ahlen and TuS Koblenz would not enter the league for the 2011–12 season. Ahlen were automatically demoted after the club had to file for administration after the completion of the 2010–11 season, while Koblenz voluntarily withdrew their participation following being unable to generate an adequate budget for the season.

The three relegated teams will be replaced by the champions of the three 2010–11 Regionalliga divisions, Chemnitzer FC, SV Darmstadt 98 and SC Preußen Münster. All three clubs will make their debuts in the 3. Liga, but nevertheless have played in a third-tier league before. Both Regionalliga Nord champions Chemnitz and Regionalliga West winners Preußen Münster returned to this level after an absence of five seasons, while Darmstadt 98 completed a four-year tenure at the fourth tier.

A further spot in the league was contested in a two-legged relegation/promotion playoff between the 16th-placed team of the 2010–11 2. Bundesliga, VfL Osnabrück, and the third-placed team of the 2010–11 3. Liga, Dynamo Dresden. Dynamo won 4–2 on aggregate and thus returned to the 2. Bundesliga after a five-year absence, while Osnabrück, 3. Liga champions in 2009–10, immediately returned to the 3. Liga, having lost their second relegation/promotion playoff series in three years. This will be the first time a previous champion has played in the 3. Liga.

=== Stadia and locations ===
Location of teams in the 2011–12 3. Fußball-Liga

Team	Location	Stadium	Stadium capacity
VfR Aalen	Aalen	Scholz-Arena	11,169
Arminia Bielefeld	Bielefeld	Schüco-Arena	27,300
SV Babelsberg 03	Potsdam	Karl-Liebknecht-Stadion	10,786
FC Carl Zeiss Jena	Jena	Ernst-Abbe-Sportfeld	12,990
Chemnitzer FC	Chemnitz	Stadion an der Gellertstraße	18,700
SV Darmstadt 98	Darmstadt	Böllenfalltor Stadion	19,600
1. FC Heidenheim 1846	Heidenheim	Voith-Arena	10,000
SSV Jahn Regensburg	Regensburg	Jahnstadion	10,724
Kickers Offenbach	Offenbach	Stadion am Bieberer Berg	13,000^{1}
VfL Osnabrück	Osnabrück	Osnatel-Arena	16,667
SC Preußen Münster	Münster	Preußenstadion	15,050
FC Rot-Weiß Erfurt	Erfurt	Steigerwaldstadion	17,500
Rot-Weiß Oberhausen	Oberhausen	Niederrheinstadion	21,318
1. FC Saarbrücken	Saarbrücken	Ludwigspark	35,303
SV Sandhausen	Sandhausen	Hardtwald	10,231
VfB Stuttgart II	Stuttgart	GAZi-Stadion auf der Waldau	10,100
SpVgg Unterhaching	Unterhaching	Stadion am Sportpark	15,053
SV Wacker Burghausen	Burghausen	Wacker-Arena	10,000
SV Wehen Wiesbaden	Wiesbaden	BRITA-Arena	12,250
SV Werder Bremen II	Bremen	Weserstadion Platz 11	5,500

Notes ^{1} Stadion am Bieberer Berg is being rebuilt during the 2011–12 season, resulting in a significantly reduced capacity during this time.

=== Personnel and sponsorships ===
Team	Head coach	Team captain	Kitmaker	Shirt sponsor
VfL Osnabrück	(Germany) Claus-Dieter Wollitz	(Germany) Claus Costa	Puma	Sparkasse Osnabrück
Rot-Weiß Oberhausen	(Germany) Mario Basler	(Greece) Dimitrios Pappas	Uhlsport	Vatro
Arminia Bielefeld	(Germany) Stefan Krämer	(Germany) Markus Schuler	Saller	Vacant
SV Wehen Wiesbaden	(Germany) Peter Vollmann	(Germany) Marco Christ	Nike	no shirt sponsor
FC Rot-Weiß Erfurt	(Germany) Stefan Emmerling	(Germany) Rudolf Zedi	Jako	E.ON Thüringen
1. FC Saarbrücken	(Germany) Jürgen Luginger	(Germany) Stephan Sieger	Nike	Victor's Residenz-Hotels
Kickers Offenbach	(Germany) Arie van Lent	(Brazil) Elton da Costa	Nike	EVO (Energieversorgung Offenbach)
SSV Jahn Regensburg	(Germany) Markus Weinzierl	(Germany) Tobias Schweinsteiger	Jako	FG.de
1. FC Heidenheim 1846	(Germany) Frank Schmidt	(Germany) Martin Klarer	Nike	Hartmann Gruppe
VfB Stuttgart II	(Germany) Jürgen Kramny	(Germany) Tobias Rathgeb	Puma	GAZI
SV Sandhausen	(Germany) Gerd Dais	(Germany) Frank Löning	Puma	Nippon
SV Babelsberg 03	(Germany) Dietmar Demuth	(Germany) Marian Unger	Umbro	EWP (Energie und Wasser Potsdam)
SpVgg Unterhaching	(Germany) Heiko Herrlich	(Germany) Stefan Riederer	Adidas	Vacant
FC Carl Zeiss Jena	(Germany) Petrik Sander	(Germany) Alexander Maul	Adidas	ReiCo Logistikgruppe
VfR Aalen	(Austria) Ralph Hasenhüttl	(Germany) Benjamin Barg	Adidas	Imtech
SV Wacker Burghausen	(Germany) Reinhard Stumpf	(Morocco) Youssef Mokhtari	Hummel	OMV
SV Werder Bremen II	(Germany) Thomas Wolter	(Germany) Sandro Stallbaum	Nike	Targobank
SV Darmstadt 98	(Germany) Kosta Runjaić	(Germany) Jan Zimmermann	Nike	Software AG
Chemnitzer FC	(Germany) Gerd Schädlich	(Germany) Carsten Sträßer	Saller	aetka Communication Center
SC Preußen Münster	(Bulgaria) Pavel Dochev	(Germany) Stefan Kühne	Nike	Tuja Zeitarbeit

=== Managerial changes ===
Team	Outgoing manager	Manner of departure	Date of vacancy	Position in table	Replaced by	Date of appointment
Kickers Offenbach	(Germany) Thomas Gerstner	Sacked	30 April 2011	Off-season	(Germany) Arie van Lent	10 May 2011
VfB Stuttgart II	(Germany) Jürgen Seeberger	Sacked	15 May 2011	Off-season	(Germany) Jürgen Kramny	1 July 2011
VfL Osnabrück	(Germany) Heiko Flottmann	End of tenure as caretaker	31 May 2011	Off-season	(Germany) Uwe Fuchs	31 May 2011
SpVgg Unterhaching	(Germany) Klaus Augenthaler	Resigned	3 June 2011	Off-season	(Germany) Heiko Herrlich	16 June 2011
Arminia Bielefeld	(Germany) Ewald Lienen	Mutual consent	30 June 2011	Off-season	(Germany) Markus von Ahlen	1 July 2011
Arminia Bielefeld	(Germany) Markus von Ahlen	Sacked	20 September 2011	19th	(Germany) Stefan Krämer	20 September 2011
Rot-Weiss Oberhausen	(Germany) Theo Schneider	Sacked	4 October 2011	17th	(Germany) Mario Basler	24 October 2011
FC Carl Zeiss Jena	(Germany) Heiko Weber	Sacked	30 October 2011	20th	(Germany) Petrik Sander	7 November 2011
VfL Osnabrück	(Germany) Uwe Fuchs	Sacked	8 December 2011	12th	(Germany) Claus-Dieter Wollitz	15 December 2011
SV Wacker Burghausen	(Germany) Rudi Bommer	Signed by Energie Cottbus	31 December 2011	9th	(Germany) Reinhard Stumpf	5 January 2012
SC Preußen Münster	(Germany) Marc Fascher	Sacked	23 January 2012	14th	(Bulgaria) Pavel Dochev	24 January 2012
SV Wehen Wiesbaden	(Italy) Gino Lettieri	Sacked	15 February 2012	13th	(Germany) Peter Vollmann	16 February 2012

== League table ==
Pos	Team	Pld	W	D	L	GF	GA	GD	Pts	Promotion, qualification or relegation
1	SV Sandhausen (C, P)	38	19	9	10	57	42	+15	66	Promotion to 2. Bundesliga and qualification for DFB-Pokal
2	VfR Aalen (P)	38	18	10	10	50	42	+8	64	Promotion to 2. Bundesliga and qualification for DFB-Pokal
3	Jahn Regensburg (O, P)	38	16	13	9	55	41	+14	61	Qualification to promotion play-offs and DFB-Pokal
4	1. FC Heidenheim	38	16	12	10	48	36	+12	60	Qualification for DFB-Pokal
5	Rot-Weiß Erfurt	38	15	14	9	54	41	+13	59	
6	Wacker Burghausen	38	13	18	7	55	47	+8	57	
7	VfL Osnabrück	38	14	13	11	46	35	+11	55	
8	Kickers Offenbach	38	15	10	13	49	41	+8	55	
9	Chemnitzer FC	38	15	10	13	47	43	+4	55	
10	1. FC Saarbrücken	38	13	15	10	61	51	+10	54	
11	VfB Stuttgart II (Note: Reserve teams are ineligible for promotion or DFB-Pokal qualification.)	38	12	14	12	44	47	−3	50	
12	Preußen Münster	38	12	14	12	40	44	−4	50	
13	Arminia Bielefeld	38	12	14	12	51	57	−6	50	
14	SV Darmstadt 98	38	12	13	13	51	47	+4	49	
15	SpVgg Unterhaching	38	12	8	18	63	59	+4	44	
16	SV Wehen Wiesbaden	38	10	14	14	40	48	−8	44	
17	SV Babelsberg 03	38	11	11	16	44	59	−15	44	
18	Carl Zeiss Jena (R)	38	9	12	17	39	59	−20	39	Relegation to Regionalliga
19	Rot-Weiß Oberhausen (R)	38	8	14	16	33	47	−14	38	Relegation to Regionalliga
20	Werder Bremen II (R)	38	4	10	24	29	70	−41	22	Relegation to Regionalliga

Source: kicker
Rules for classification: 1) points; 2) goal difference; 3) number of goals scored.
(C) Champions; (O) Play-off winners; (P) Promoted; (R) Relegated

== Results ==
Home \ Away	AAL	SVB	DSC	BR2	WBU	CFC	D98	ERF	FCH	JEN	PRM	RWO	KOF	OSN	JRE	FCS	SVS	ST2	UNT	WEH
VfR Aalen	—	1–3	3–1	2–0	2–0	0–2	1–1	2–0	0–0	4–1	1–0	0–0	2–1	0–4	2–1	1–1	2–0	2–2	1–0	2–0
SV Babelsberg	2–0	—	1–0	2–3	0–2	0–0	1–1	3–0	2–2	0–0	0–2	1–0	0–1	2–1	0–0	1–3	1–2	1–4	1–2	3–2
Arminia Bielefeld	0–1	1–0	—	1–0	2–2	3–1	3–2	0–0	0–1	2–1	2–2	3–0	1–1	1–1	1–1	0–4	1–3	1–2	2–1	0–1
Werder Bremen II	0–4	1–2	2–3	—	1–1	0–2	0–4	1–1	2–1	2–2	0–0	0–1	0–4	0–2	1–4	2–2	0–2	3–1	1–1	1–1
Wacker Burghausen	0–0	1–1	2–2	3–1	—	3–0	1–1	1–1	2–1	4–2	1–0	3–2	2–3	2–0	1–1	2–0	0–0	1–1	3–1	2–2
Chemnitzer FC	0–1	2–1	1–1	2–0	2–1	—	0–0	0–2	3–0	1–1	1–2	1–0	2–0	3–1	0–3	1–0	1–3	1–1	5–1	1–1
Darmstadt 98	1–2	3–1	5–1	2–0	2–3	2–1	—	1–1	2–1	3–0	2–1	1–1	0–0	0–1	1–1	1–0	4–1	2–2	0–0	0–1
Rot-Weiß Erfurt	0–1	2–3	1–1	1–0	3–3	0–0	2–0	—	2–0	3–0	1–1	4–0	0–0	0–0	2–2	1–1	4–2	3–1	2–1	2–2
1. FC Heidenheim	3–1	5–0	2–1	1–0	1–1	3–2	2–1	0–1	—	0–0	4–1	1–0	2–1	0–2	0–0	1–1	2–1	1–0	3–1	1–1
Carl Zeiss Jena	2–3	1–2	4–3	3–1	1–0	1–2	2–1	1–0	0–0	—	1–3	0–0	1–2	2–0	0–1	1–1	1–1	1–2	2–0	1–0
Preußen Münster	1–0	1–1	0–0	0–0	0–0	2–2	1–2	3–2	2–1	1–0	—	1–0	1–0	1–0	2–0	1–0	1–2	1–1	1–1	1–1
Rot-Weiß Oberhausen	0–0	1–0	0–1	1–1	2–0	2–2	1–1	0–1	0–3	1–2	2–2	—	1–1	1–1	1–2	0–0	4–1	2–1	1–0	2–1
Kickers Offenbach	2–1	1–1	0–1	3–0	2–2	0–1	1–1	2–0	1–0	1–1	3–0	1–0	—	3–0	2–1	2–3	2–0	2–0	1–4	0–2
VfL Osnabrück	0–0	1–0	1–1	1–1	1–1	1–0	4–1	2–3	0–0	2–2	1–0	1–1	1–0	—	0–1	2–0	2–1	0–1	4–1	2–0
Jahn Regensburg	4–0	1–1	2–2	3–2	0–1	1–0	2–1	2–2	1–1	1–1	2–1	0–0	1–3	0–3	—	4–1	1–1	2–0	2–0	2–1
1. FC Saarbrücken	4–2	2–2	2–4	2–0	0–0	1–1	4–0	0–2	0–0	2–1	2–2	5–2	3–1	2–2	1–0	—	2–1	0–0	4–2	2–1
SV Sandhausen	2–0	4–0	0–0	2–0	3–1	0–3	2–0	2–1	1–2	1–0	2–0	2–1	1–1	0–0	2–1	1–1	—	1–0	3–1	0–0
VfB Stuttgart II	2–2	3–1	2–5	1–0	2–3	0–1	1–1	2–0	1–0	3–0	1–1	1–1	0–0	1–0	1–0	1–1	0–1	—	2–1	0–0
SpVgg Unterhaching	1–1	1–2	5–0	0–2	4–0	3–0	1–0	1–3	1–1	6–0	2–1	1–2	2–0	1–1	2–3	3–2	2–2	4–0	—	5–1
Wehen Wiesbaden	1–3	2–2	0–0	2–1	0–0	2–0	0–1	0–1	1–2	0–0	3–0	1–0	3–1	2–1	1–2	3–2	0–4	1–1	0–0	—

Source: DFB
Legend: Blue = home team win; Yellow = draw; Red = away team win.

== Top goalscorers ==
Source: kicker (German)
Including matches played on 5 May 2012

17 goals

- (Germany) Marcel Reichwein (Rot-Weiß Erfurt)

14 goals

- (Germany) Robert Lechleiter (VfR Aalen)
- (Germany) Tobias Schweinsteiger (Jahn Regensburg)

13 goals

- (Germany) Sebastian Glasner (Wacker Burghausen)
- (Germany) Frank Löning (SV Sandhausen)
- (Germany) Dominik Stroh-Engel (SV Babelsberg 03)

12 goals

- (Bosnia and Herzegovina) Zlatko Janjić (SV Wehen Wiesbaden)
- (Germany) Markus Müller (SV Babelsberg 03)

11 goals

- (Germany) Marius Laux (1. FC Saarbrücken)
- (Germany) Marc Schnatterer (1. FC Heidenheim)
- (Netherlands) Mijo Tunjić (SpVgg Unterhaching)
- (Germany) Marcel Ziemer (1. FC Saarbrücken)

== Player awards ==
The following players were named as player of the month throughout the season. Fabian Klos won the player of the year award after a poll.

- August: (Germany) Tobias Schweinsteiger (SpVgg Unterhaching)
- September: (Germany) Tobias Schweinsteiger (SpVgg Unterhaching)
- October: (Germany) Niclas Füllkrug (Werder Bremen II)
- November: (Germany) Johannes Rahn (Arminia Bielefeld)
- December: (Germany) Fabian Klos (Arminia Bielefeld)
- February: (Germany) Anton Fink (Chemnitzer FC)
- March: (Germany) Marcel Reichwein (Rot-Weiss Erfurt)
- April: (Germany) Marc Schnatterer (1. FC Heidenheim)
