= 2011–12 2. Bundesliga =

38th season of the second-tier football league in Germany

2. Bundesliga
- Season: 2011–12
- Promoted: SpVgg Greuther Fürth; Eintracht Frankfurt; Fortuna Düsseldorf
- Relegated: Karlsruher SC (via play-off); Alemannia Aachen; Hansa Rostock
- Matches: 306
- Goals: 855 (2.79 per match)
- Top goalscorer: Alexander Meier; Olivier Occean; Nick Proschwitz (17 goals each)
- Biggest home win: Bochum 6–0 E. Aue
- Biggest away win: E. Cottbus 0–5 1860 Munich; Karlsruhe 0–5 F. Düsseldorf; H. Rostock 0–5 FSV Frankfurt
- Highest scoring: Union Berlin 5–4 Hansa Rostock
- Longest winning run: 6 matches Greuther Fürth
- Longest unbeaten run: 18 matches by Fortuna Düsseldorf
- Longest winless run: 11 matches by Alemannia Aachen
- Longest losing run: 5 matches by Alemannia Aachen; VfL Bochum; MSV Duisburg; SC Paderborn 07
- Average attendance: 17,230

The 2011–12 2. Bundesliga was the 38th season of the 2. Bundesliga, Germany's second tier of its football league system. The season commenced on 15 July 2011, three weeks earlier than the 2011–12 Bundesliga season, and ended with the last games on 6 May 2012. The traditional winter break was to be held between the weekends around 18 December 2011 and 4 February 2012. The league comprises eighteen teams.

== Teams ==
At the end of the 2010–11 season, champions Hertha BSC and runners-up FC Augsburg were directly promoted to the 2011–12 Bundesliga. The Berlin side has directly returned to the highest German football league, while Augsburg ended a five-year tenure in the second level of German football. The two teams were replaced by Eintracht Frankfurt and FC St. Pauli, who were directly relegated from the 2010–11 Bundesliga season. Frankfurt returned to the 2. Bundesliga after six years, while St. Pauli made a direct comeback to the league.

On the other end of the table, Rot-Weiß Oberhausen and Arminia Bielefeld were directly relegated to the 2011–12 3. Liga, after finishing the 2010–11 season in the bottom two spots of the table. Oberhausen was dropped to the third level after three years, while Bielefeld will leave the 2. Bundesliga after two seasons. The two relegated teams were replaced by 2010–11 3. Liga champions Eintracht Braunschweig and runners-up Hansa Rostock. Braunschweig returned to the 2. Bundesliga after a total of four seasons at the third tier of the German football pyramid, while Rostock immediately bounced back from their relegation twelve months earlier.

A further two places were given to VfL Bochum as losers of the Bundesliga relegation playoff and Dynamo Dresden as winners of the 2. Bundesliga relegation playoff. Dresden returned to the 2. Bundesliga after a five-year absence after beating VfL Osnabrück 4–2 on aggregate; Osnabrück were thus immediately relegated back to the 3. Liga. In the Bundesliga playoff, Bochum retained its spot in the league after losing 2–1 on aggregate against Borussia Mönchengladbach.

=== Stadiums and locations ===
Location of teams in the 2011–12 2. Bundesliga

Team	Location	Stadium	Stadium capacity
Alemannia Aachen	Aachen	New Tivoli	32,960
VfL Bochum	Bochum	rewirPower-Stadion	29,448
MSV Duisburg	Duisburg	Schauinsland-Reisen-Arena	31,500
Dynamo Dresden	Dresden	Glücksgas-Stadion	32,066
Eintracht Braunschweig	Braunschweig	Eintracht-Stadion	24,000
Eintracht Frankfurt	Frankfurt am Main	Commerzbank-Arena	51,500
Energie Cottbus	Cottbus	Stadion der Freundschaft	22,528
FC Erzgebirge Aue	Aue	Sparkassen-Erzgebirgsstadion	15,700
Fortuna Düsseldorf	Düsseldorf	Esprit Arena	54,400
FSV Frankfurt	Frankfurt am Main	Frankfurter Volksbank Stadion	10,826
SpVgg Greuther Fürth	Fürth	Trolli Arena	15,000
Hansa Rostock	Rostock	DKB-Arena	29,000
FC Ingolstadt 04	Ingolstadt	Audi Sportpark	15,445
Karlsruher SC	Karlsruhe	Wildparkstadion	29,699
1860 Munich	Munich	Allianz Arena	69,000
SC Paderborn 07	Paderborn	Energieteam Arena	15,000
FC St. Pauli	Hamburg	Millerntor-Stadion	24,487
Union Berlin	Berlin	Alte Försterei	18,432

=== Personnel and sponsorships ===
Team	Head coach	Team captain	Kitmaker	Shirt sponsor
Alemannia Aachen	(Germany) Ralf Außem	(Germany) Benjamin Auer	Nike	AachenMünchener
VfL Bochum	(Germany) Andreas Bergmann	(Germany) Christoph Dabrowski	Nike	Netto
MSV Duisburg	(Germany) Oliver Reck	(Serbia) Srđan Baljak	Nike	Rheinpower
Dynamo Dresden	(Germany) Ralf Loose	(Germany) Robert Koch	Nike	Veolia
Eintracht Braunschweig	(Germany) Torsten Lieberknecht	(Germany) Dennis Kruppke	Puma	Volkswagen Bank
Eintracht Frankfurt	(Germany) Armin Veh	(Switzerland) Pirmin Schwegler	Jako	Fraport
Energie Cottbus	(Germany) Rudi Bommer	(Germany) Marc-André Kruska	Umbro	Tropical Islands
Erzgebirge Aue	(Germany) Karsten Baumann	(Germany) René Klingbeil	Puma	Spar mit! Reisen
Fortuna Düsseldorf	(Germany) Norbert Meier	(Germany) Andreas Lambertz	Puma	Bauhaus
FSV Frankfurt	(Germany) Benno Möhlmann	(Germany) Björn Schlicke	Saller	Hyundai
SpVgg Greuther Fürth	(Germany) Michael Büskens	(Germany) Thomas Kleine	Jako	Ergo Direkt Versicherungen
Hansa Rostock	(Germany) Wolfgang Wolf	(Germany) Sebastian Pelzer	Nike	Veolia Umweltservice
FC Ingolstadt 04	(Germany) Tomas Oral	(Germany) Moritz Hartmann	Adidas	Audi
Karlsruher SC	(Germany) Markus Kauczinski	(Georgia (country)) Alexander Iashvili	Nike	Klaiber Markisen
1860 Munich	(Germany) Reiner Maurer	(Germany) Benjamin Lauth	Uhlsport	Aston Martin
SC Paderborn 07	(Germany) Roger Schmidt	(Germany) Markus Krösche	Puma	Möbelhaus Finke
FC St. Pauli	(Germany) André Schubert	(Germany) Fabio Morena	Do You Football	Ein Platz an der Sonne
1. FC Union Berlin	(Germany) Uwe Neuhaus	(Germany) Torsten Mattuschka	Uhlsport	kfzteile24

=== Managerial changes ===
Team	Outgoing manager	Manner of departure	Date of vacancy	Position in table	Replaced by	Date of appointment
Eintracht Frankfurt	(Germany) Christoph Daum	Resigned	16 May 2011	Off-season	(Germany) Armin Veh	1 July 2011
SC Paderborn 07	(Germany) André Schubert	Signed by St. Pauli	30 June 2011	Off-season	(Germany) Roger Schmidt	1 July 2011
FC St. Pauli	(Germany) Holger Stanislawski	End of contract	30 June 2011	Off-season	(Germany) André Schubert	1 July 2011
Alemannia Aachen	(Germany) Peter Hyballa	Sacked	13 September 2011	18th	(Germany) Friedhelm Funkel	19 September 2011
VfL Bochum	(Germany) Friedhelm Funkel	Sacked	14 September 2011	17th	(Germany) Andreas Bergmann	15 September 2011
MSV Duisburg	(Croatia) Milan Šašić	Sacked	28 October 2011	14th	(Germany) Oliver Reck	28 October 2011
Karlsruher SC	(Germany) Rainer Scharinger	Sacked	31 October 2011	17th	(Norway) Jørn Andersen	6 November 2011
FC Ingolstadt 04	(Germany) Benno Möhlmann	Sacked	9 November 2011	18th	(Germany) Tomas Oral	10 November 2011
Hansa Rostock	(Germany) Peter Vollmann	Sacked	6 December 2011	17th	(Germany) Wolfgang Wolf	7 December 2011
Energie Cottbus	(Germany) Claus-Dieter Wollitz	Mutual Consent	8 December 2011	9th	(Germany) Rudi Bommer	1 January 2012
FSV Frankfurt	(Germany) Hans-Jürgen Boysen	Sacked	17 December 2011	16th	(Germany) Benno Möhlmann	21 December 2011
Erzgebirge Aue	(Germany) Rico Schmitt	Sacked	21 February 2012	14th	(Germany) Karsten Baumann	22 February 2012
Karlsruher SC	(Norway) Jørn Andersen	Sacked	26 March 2012	17th	(Germany) Markus Kauczinski	26 March 2012
Alemannia Aachen	(Germany) Friedhelm Funkel	Sacked	1 April 2012	17th	(Germany) Ralf Außem	1 April 2012

== League table ==
Pos	Team	Pld	W	D	L	GF	GA	GD	Pts	Promotion, qualification or relegation
1	Greuther Fürth (C, P)	34	20	10	4	73	27	+46	70	Promotion to Bundesliga
2	Eintracht Frankfurt (P)	34	20	8	6	76	33	+43	68	Promotion to Bundesliga
3	Fortuna Düsseldorf (O, P)	34	16	14	4	64	35	+29	62	Qualification for promotion play-offs
4	FC St. Pauli	34	18	8	8	59	34	+25	62	
5	SC Paderborn	34	17	10	7	51	42	+9	61	
6	1860 Munich	34	17	6	11	62	46	+16	57	
7	Union Berlin	34	14	6	14	55	58	−3	48	
8	Eintracht Braunschweig	34	10	15	9	37	35	+2	45	
9	Dynamo Dresden	34	12	9	13	50	52	−2	45	
10	MSV Duisburg	34	10	9	15	42	47	−5	39	
11	VfL Bochum	34	10	7	17	41	55	−14	37	
12	FC Ingolstadt	34	8	13	13	43	58	−15	37	
13	FSV Frankfurt	34	7	14	13	43	59	−16	35	
14	Energie Cottbus	34	8	11	15	30	49	−19	35	
15	Erzgebirge Aue	34	8	11	15	31	55	−24	35	
16	Karlsruher SC (R)	34	9	6	19	34	60	−26	33	Qualification for relegation play-offs
17	Alemannia Aachen (R)	34	6	13	15	30	47	−17	31	Relegation to 3. Liga
18	Hansa Rostock (R)	34	5	12	17	34	63	−29	27	Relegation to 3. Liga

Source: kicker
Rules for classification: 1) points; 2) goal difference; 3) number of goals scored.
(C) Champions; (O) Play-off winners; (P) Promoted; (R) Relegated

== Results ==
Home \ Away	AAC	AUE	UNB	BOC	EBS	FCE	SGD	DUI	F95	SGE	FSV	SGF	FCI	KSC	M60	SCP	ROS	STP
Alemannia Aachen	—	1–1	1–3	2–0	0–2	0–2	0–1	2–2	0–0	0–3	1–3	0–0	3–1	1–0	2–2	0–3	0–0	2–1
Erzgebirge Aue	1–0	—	1–1	2–1	1–1	0–0	1–1	1–2	2–4	1–2	4–3	1–1	1–1	0–2	0–0	0–2	1–0	2–1
Union Berlin	2–0	1–0	—	2–1	1–0	1–0	4–0	1–1	0–0	0–4	4–0	0–4	4–1	2–0	0–1	3–0	5–4	0–2
VfL Bochum	1–0	6–0	4–2	—	2–0	0–1	0–2	2–1	1–1	0–2	1–0	1–4	0–1	0–0	2–2	0–4	2–1	1–2
Eintracht Braunschweig	1–1	1–1	1–2	4–0	—	3–1	0–2	0–0	1–1	0–3	0–0	0–0	3–1	0–0	3–1	0–0	3–2	1–0
Energie Cottbus	1–1	2–0	2–1	1–1	1–1	—	2–1	1–1	1–1	3–3	1–1	0–2	0–0	2–0	0–5	0–2	0–1	1–4
Dynamo Dresden	1–1	1–2	4–0	2–1	2–2	2–1	—	2–0	2–1	1–4	2–2	3–1	0–0	5–1	0–1	1–2	1–1	1–0
MSV Duisburg	2–0	2–1	1–1	2–1	3–0	1–2	3–0	—	0–2	2–0	1–2	0–2	3–1	3–1	0–3	0–1	0–0	0–1
Fortuna Düsseldorf	0–0	3–1	2–1	2–0	1–1	4–2	2–1	2–2	—	1–1	1–0	2–1	4–1	4–2	3–1	2–3	2–0	0–0
Eintracht Frankfurt	4–3	4–0	3–1	3–0	2–1	1–0	3–0	3–0	1–1	—	6–1	0–0	1–1	2–0	0–2	0–0	4–1	1–1
FSV Frankfurt	2–1	1–1	1–1	0–2	1–1	0–1	1–1	0–0	2–5	0–4	—	1–1	1–1	2–1	3–1	2–2	0–0	3–3
Greuther Fürth	1–0	2–0	5–0	6–2	1–3	3–0	1–0	2–1	1–1	2–3	4–0	—	3–0	3–0	2–0	5–1	3–0	2–1
FC Ingolstadt	3–3	0–0	3–3	3–5	0–1	1–0	4–2	1–1	1–1	1–1	1–1	0–0	—	2–1	0–1	4–0	3–1	1–0
Karlsruher SC	0–2	2–1	2–0	0–0	1–3	2–0	2–0	3–2	0–5	1–0	0–4	2–2	3–2	—	1–3	2–0	2–2	0–2
1860 Munich	1–2	4–0	3–1	1–3	3–0	2–0	2–4	2–1	2–1	2–1	4–0	1–4	4–1	2–1	—	1–1	0–1	1–1
SC Paderborn	0–0	1–0	3–2	0–0	1–0	3–1	2–2	1–2	1–1	4–2	1–0	0–1	4–1	2–1	2–2	—	2–0	1–1
Hansa Rostock	0–0	0–1	2–5	0–0	0–0	1–1	2–2	4–2	2–1	1–5	0–5	2–2	1–2	1–1	2–0	1–2	—	1–3
FC St. Pauli	3–1	2–3	2–1	2–1	0–0	0–0	3–1	2–1	1–3	2–0	2–1	2–2	2–0	1–0	4–2	5–0	3–0	—

Source: DFB
Legend: Blue = home team win; Yellow = draw; Red = away team win.

== Promotion/relegation play-offs ==
The 16th-placed team faced the third-placed 2011–12 3. Liga side for a two-legged play-off. The winner on aggregate score after both matches will earn a spot in the 2012–13 2. Bundesliga.

Dates and times of these matches were determined by the Deutsche Fußball-Liga as following:

11 May 2012
20:30 CEST

Jahn Regensburg	1–1	Karlsruher SC
Alibaz 58' (pen.)	Report	76' Groß

Jahnstadion, Regensburg
Attendance: 10,724
Referee: Christian Dingert (Thallichtenberg)

14 May 2012
20:30 CEST

Karlsruher SC	2–2	Jahn Regensburg
Lavrič 32'; Charalambous 56'	Report	26' Hein; 66' Laurito

Wildparkstadion, Karlsruhe
Attendance: 29,699
Referee: Felix Zwayer (Berlin)

The tie ended 3–3 on aggregate; Jahn Regensburg promoted to 2012–13 2. Bundesliga, and Karlsruher SC relegated to 2012–13 3. Liga according to away goals rule 2–1.

== Statistics ==
=== Top goalscorers ===
Source: Bundesliga.de

17 goals

- (Germany) Alexander Meier (Eintracht Frankfurt)
- (Canada) Olivier Occean (SpVgg Greuther Fürth)
- (Germany) Nick Proschwitz (SC Paderborn 07)

14 goals

- (Cameroon) Mohammadou Idrissou (Eintracht Frankfurt)
- (Germany) Kevin Volland (1860 Munich)

13 goals

- (Slovenia) Zlatko Dedič (Dynamo Dresden)
- (Germany) Max Kruse (FC St. Pauli)
- (Germany) Christopher Nöthe (SpVgg Greuther Fürth)
- (Germany) Sascha Rösler (Fortuna Düsseldorf)

12 goals

- (Benin) Mickaël Poté (Dynamo Dresden)
- (Bulgaria) Dimitar Rangelov (Energie Cottbus)

=== Top assists ===
Source: Bundesliga.de Archived 7 August 2012 at the Wayback Machine

12 assists

- (Turkey) Sercan Sararer (SpVgg Greuther Fürth)

10 assists

- (Germany) Benjamin Lauth (1860 Munich)
- (Germany) Sebastian Rode (Eintracht Frankfurt)

9 assists

- (Germany) Stefan Leitl (FC Ingolstadt 04)

8 assists

- (Germany) Benjamin Köhler (Eintracht Frankfurt)
- (Germany) Torsten Mattuschka (1. FC Union Berlin)
- (Albania) Alban Meha (SC Paderborn 07)
- (Germany) Sascha Rösler (Fortuna Düsseldorf)

7 assists

- (Germany) Marius Ebbers (FC St. Pauli)
- (Germany) Jan Hochscheidt (Erzgebirge Aue)
- (Georgia (country)) Alexander Iashvili (Karlsruher SC)
- (Philippines) Stephan Schröck (SpVgg Greuther Fürth)
