= Riederer =

Riederer is a French/German surname. Notable people with the surname include:

- Albert Riederer (1945–2012), American jurist and politician
- Johann Riederer (born 1957), German sport shooter
- Peter Riederer (born 1942), German neuroscientist
- Stefan Riederer (born 1985), German footballer
- Sven Riederer (born 1981), Swiss triathlete
