= Thijs Bouma =

Dutch footballer

Personal information
- Date of birth: 2 April 1992 (age 34)
- Place of birth: Hardenberg, Netherlands
- Height: 1.84 m (6 ft 1/2 in)
- Position: Right back

Youth career
- –2009: Hardenberg '85
- 2009–2012: FC Twente

Senior career*
Years	Team	Apps	(Gls)
2012–2014	FC Twente	0	(0)
2012–2013	→ VfL Osnabrück (loan)	8	(0)
2013–2014	→ Jong FC Twente	23	(2)
2014–2015	Almere City	36	(0)
2015–2016	De Graafschap	6	(0)
- * Club domestic league appearances and goals as of 4 July 2016

Thijs Bouma (born 2 April 1992) is a Dutch retired footballer who played as a right back.

== Club career ==
Bouma spent three years playing for FC Twente's reserve team before joining VfL Osnabrück on loan at the end of the summer 2012 transfer window. He made his debut for the club the next day, in a 1–0 3. Liga defeat to SV Babelsberg 03, when he replaced Claus Costa at half-time. After spending one season at Jong FC Twente, Bouma was released and signed a one-year deal with Eerste Divisie side Almere City.

In summer 2015 Bouma moved on to De Graafschap, only to suffer a broken calf in pre-season which took him out for a couple of months. He was released by the club a year later.

== Personal life ==
Bouma also pursued a modelling career.
