= Malte Beermann =

German footballer

Personal information
- Date of birth: 31 March 1992 (age 34)
- Place of birth: Ostercappeln, Germany
- Height: 1.83 m (6 ft 0 in)
- Position: Midfielder

Team information
- Current team: Blau-Weiß Lohne
- Number: 6

Youth career
- –2006: OFV Ostercappeln
- 2006–2011: Werder Bremen

Senior career*
Years	Team	Apps	(Gls)
2011–2012	Werder Bremen III	13	(9)
2011–2012	Werder Bremen II	1	(0)
2012–2014	BV Cloppenburg	53	(0)
2014–2016	SV Rödinghausen	27	(0)
2015–2016	SV Rödinghausen II	4	(1)
2016–	Blau-Weiß Lohne	135	(1)
2018	Blau-Weiß Lohne II	1	(0)
- * Club domestic league appearances and goals as of 1 January 2025

Malte Beermann (born 31 March 1992) is a German footballer who plays as a midfielder for Blau-Weiß Lohne.

== Career ==
Beermann made his professional debut for Werder Bremen II in the 3. Liga on 5 May 2012, coming on as a substitute in the 67th minute for Florian Nagel in the 0–1 away loss against Arminia Bielefeld.

== Personal life ==
Beermann's older brother, Timo, is also a professional footballer.
