= Sven Schimmel =

German footballer

Personal information
- Date of birth: July 30, 1989 (age 37)
- Place of birth: Reutlingen, West Germany
- Position: Defender

Youth career
- –2001: SV Rommelsbach
- 2001–2008: VfB Stuttgart

Senior career*
| Years | Team | Apps | (Gls) |
| 2008–2011 | VfB Stuttgart II | 46 | (0) |
| 2011–2013 | SV Wehen Wiesbaden | 62 | (0) |
| 2013–2015 | SSV Reutlingen | 51 | (5) |
| 2015–2019 | SGV Freiberg | | |
- * Club domestic league appearances and goals

Sven Schimmel (born July 30, 1989) is a German footballer who plays as a defender. He began his career with VfB Stuttgart, and made his debut for the reserve team in October 2008, as a substitute for Johannes Rahn in a 3. Liga match against Fortuna Düsseldorf. He made 46 appearances for VfB Stuttgart II before joining SV Wehen Wiesbaden in 2011.
