= Ralf Sträßer =

German footballer and manager

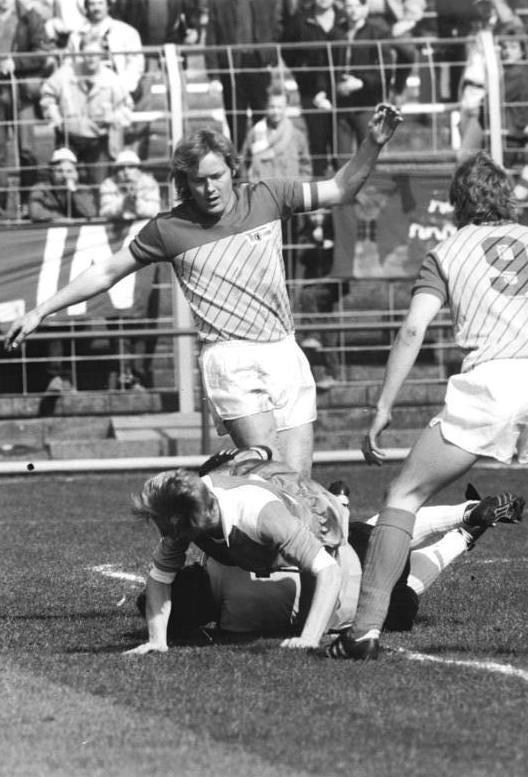
- Sträßer in 1987

Personal information
- Date of birth: 20 June 1958 (age 68)
- Place of birth: Berlin, East Germany
- Height: 1.77 m (5 ft 10 in)
- Position: Striker

Team information
- Current team: TSV Markt-Bibart (Manager)

Youth career
- 1966–1968: BSG Post Berlin
- 1968–1976: BFC Dynamo

Senior career*
Years	Team	Apps	(Gls)
1976–1984	BFC Dynamo	144	(39)
1984–1987	Union Berlin	79	(38)
1987–1989	Carl Zeiss Jena	37	(10)
1989–1990	BSG Jenaer Glaswek		
1990	1. FC Schweinfurt 05		
1990–1991	TSV Vestenbergsgreuth		
1991–1995	TSV 1860 Scheinfeld		
1995–1996	TSV Markt-Bibart		
1996–1997	ASV Ippesheim		

International career
	East Germany U-18	9	(0)
	East Germany U-21	15	(3)
1982–1986	East Germany	4	(0)
1986	East Germany Olympic	2	(0)

Managerial career
- ASV Ippesheim
- 2008–2009: TSV Vestenbergsgreuth
- 2009–2011: RSV Sugenheim
- 2012-: TSV Markt-Bibart
- * Club domestic league appearances and goals

Ralf Sträßer (born 20 June 1958) is a German former professional footballer who played as a striker.

== Career ==
Born in Berlin, Sträßer began playing football for the BSG Post Berlin at eight years old and joined the youth department the BFC Dynamo two years later. He took the leap into the first team of BFC Dynamo, after making appearance for the second team in the DDR-Liga. He made his debut for the first team of BFC Dynamo against FC Vorwärts Frankfurt in the 11th match day of the 1976–77 season on 2 December 1976. Sträßer scored his first goal for BFC Dynamo in the DDR-Oberliga on the East German national goalkeeper Jürgen Croy away against BSG Sachsenring Zwickau in the following matchday.

Sträßer played in the East German top division for BFC Dynamo, 1. FC Union Berlin and FC Carl Zeiss Jena. In 226 matches he managed to score 68 goals. He became six times East German football champion in a row with BFC Dynamo.

Sträßer, who was part of the East German Under 21 team which won the silver medal at the European Under-21 Championship 1980, won four caps for East Germany.

He is the father of Carsten Sträßer.
