= Michael Wiemann =

German footballer

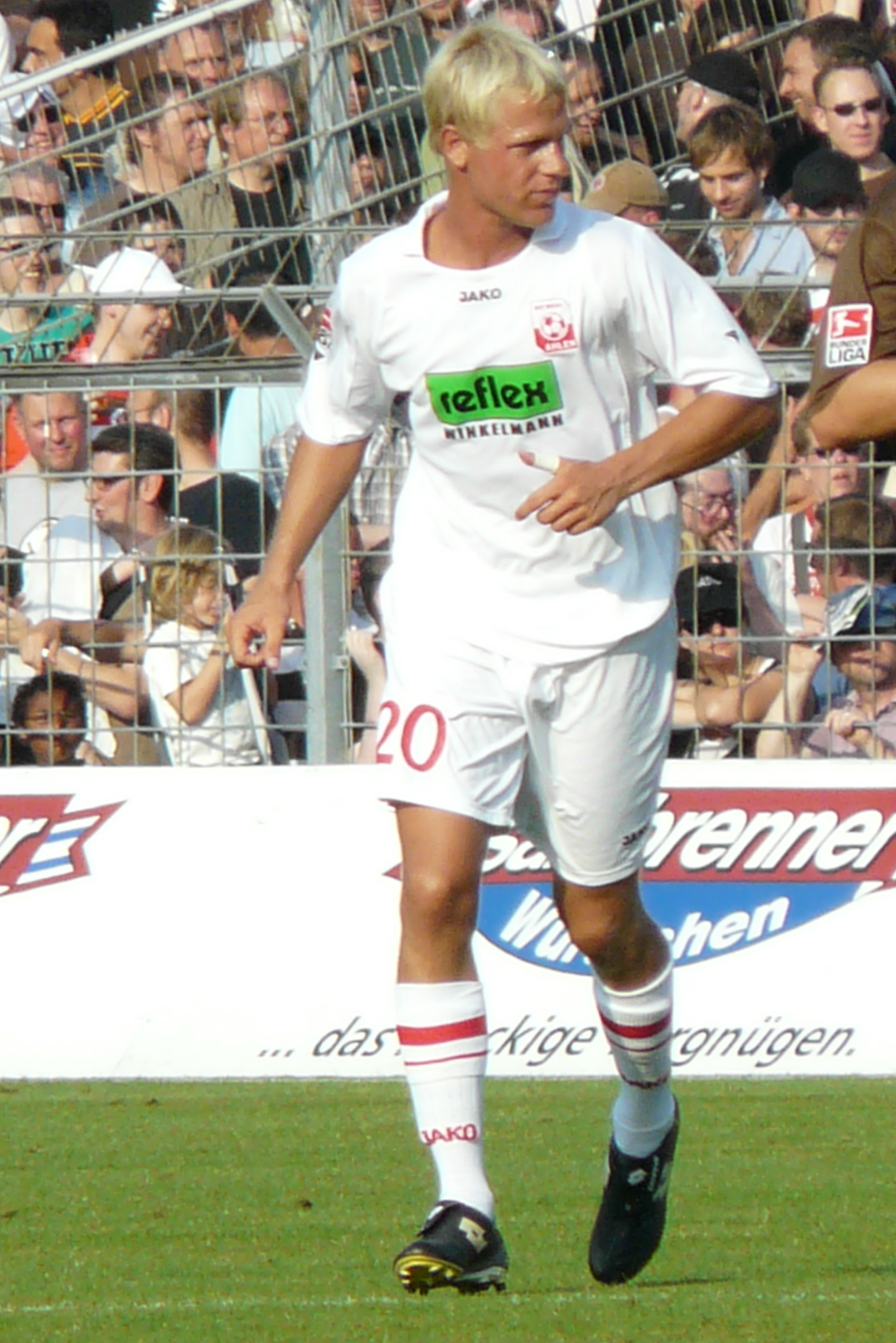
- Wiemann in 2009

Personal information
- Date of birth: 9 February 1987 (age 39)
- Place of birth: Beckum, West Germany
- Height: 1.88 m (6 ft 2 in)
- Position: Centre-back

Youth career
- SpVg Beckum
- –2000: SV Neubeckum
- 2000–2007: Rot Weiss Ahlen

Senior career*
Years	Team	Apps	(Gls)
2007–2010	Rot Weiss Ahlen	91	(1)
2010–2012	Hansa Rostock	60	(4)
2012–2015	SV Wehen Wiesbaden	100	(6)
2015–2016	Atlético Baleares	32	(0)
2017	SC Wiedenbrück	4	(0)
Total		287	(11)
- * Club domestic league appearances and goals

Michael Wiemann (born 9 February 1987) is a German former professional footballer who played as a centre-back.

Wiemann started his senior career at Rot Weiss Ahlen in 2007, and won promotion to the 2. Bundesliga in 2008. After the club's relegation to the 3. Liga in 2010, he moved to fellow 3. Liga side Hansa Rostock, where he won promotion to the 2. Bundesliga in his debut season at the club. He transferred to Wehen Wiesbaden in 2012, and spent three seasons there, before playing the 2015–16 season in Spain with Atlético Baleares.

== Career ==
=== Rot Weiss Ahlen ===
Wiemann played youth football with SpVg Beckum and SV Neubeckum before moving to Rot Weiss Ahlen in 2000. He broke into the first team during the 2006–07 season, making his debut as a substitute in a 1–1 Regionalliga Nord draw with Rot-Weiß Erfurt on 10 February 2007, and making 14 league appearances in total that season.

Wiemann made 27 Regionalliga Nord appearances during the 2007–08 season, as Ahlen ended the season as champions of the Regionalliga Nord and won promotion to the 2. Bundesliga.

Wiemann missed the start of the 2008–09 season through a foot injury, but made his 2. Bundesliga debut on 28 September as a substitute in a 3–1 win over Wehen Wiesbaden. In March 2009, his contract with the club was extended to summer 2011, having made 15 2. Bundesliga appearances that season so far. He made 24 2. Bundesliga appearances in total that season, and made 26 across the 2009–10 season, in which he scored once, in a 2–0 win over Alemannia Aachen on 27 November 2009, though Ahlen were relegated at the end of the season to the 3. Liga, having finished bottom of the league with 22 points.

=== Hansa Rostock ===
In summer 2010, Wiemann was signed by Hansa Rostock, who had also been relegated to the 3. Liga. He signed a three-year contract with the club. He scored four times in 36 matches across the 2010–11 season, as Hansa were promoted back to the 2. Bundesliga after a second-placed finish, and he made 24 league appearances the following season.

=== Wehen Wiesbaden ===
In May 2012, Wehen Wiesbaden announced the signing of Wiemann on a two-year contract. In January 2014, Wiemann extended his contract with the club to summer 2016. He left the club in summer 2015 however, having scored 6 goals in 100 3. Liga matches over three seasons at the club.

=== Atlético Baleares ===
On 1 July 2015, it was announced that he had signed for Spanish Segunda División B club Atlético Baleares. He made 32 league appearances, but left the club in August 2016 after his contract was terminated.

=== Later career ===
After an unsuccessful trial spell with SC Paderborn, Wiemann signed for SC Wiedenbrück in January 2017, where he made 4 appearances in the Regionalliga West. He later played with hometown club SV Neubeckum's reserve team, where and later worked as a coach at the club.

== Style of play ==
Weimann was a centre-back who could also play as a defensive midfielder.

== Personal life ==
He has a brother Stefan who played as a footballer for SV Neubeckum.

== Career statistics ==
Appearances and goals by club, season and competition
Club	Season	League			DFB-Pokal		Total	
Club	Season	Division	Apps	Goals	Apps	Goals	Apps	Goals
Rot Weiss Ahlen	2006–07	Regionalliga Nord	14	0	—		14	0
Rot Weiss Ahlen	2007–08	Regionalliga Nord	27	0	1	0	28	0
Rot Weiss Ahlen	2008–09	2. Bundesliga	24	0	0	0	24	0
Rot Weiss Ahlen	2009–10	2. Bundesliga	26	1	2	0	28	1
Rot Weiss Ahlen	Total		91	1	3	0	94	1
Hansa Rostock	2010–11	3. Liga	36	4	1	0	37	4
Hansa Rostock	2011–12	2. Bundesliga	24	0	1	0	25	0
Hansa Rostock	Total		60	4	2	0	62	4
Wehen Wiesbaden	2012–13	3. Liga	35	0	—		35	0
Wehen Wiesbaden	2013–14	3. Liga	35	4	—		35	4
Wehen Wiesbaden	2014–15	3. Liga	30	2	1	0	31	2
Wehen Wiesbaden	Total		100	6	1	0	101	6
Atlético Baleares	2015–16	Segunda División B Group 3	32	0	—		32	0
SC Wiedenbrück	2016–17	Regionalliga West	4	0	—		4	0
Career total			287	11	6	0	293	11
