= Ralf Aussem =

German footballer (born 1960)

Ralf Außem
Personal information
- Date of birth: 1 September 1960 (age 66)
- Place of birth: Cologne, West Germany
- Height: 1.79 m (5 ft 10 in)
- Position: Defender

Team information
- Current team: 1. FC Köln (youth)

Senior career*
Years	Team	Apps	(Gls)
1979–1980	1. FC Köln	1	(0)
1980–1981	SC Viktoria 04 Köln	33	(3)
1981–1984	Hannover 96	92	(5)
1984–1991	Fortuna Köln	193	(15)
Total		319	(23)

Managerial career
- 2002–2004: Fortuna Köln
- 2007: Fortuna Köln
- 2007–2009: Rot-Weiss Essen (assistant)
- 2009–2010: Rot-Weiss Essen
- 2010–2012: Alemannia Aachen II
- 2011: → Alemannia Aachen (caretaker)
- 2012: → Alemannia Aachen (caretaker)
- 2013: Viktoria Köln
- 2013–: 1. FC Köln (youth)
- * Club domestic league appearances and goals

Ralf Außem (born 1 September 1960) is a German football manager and former player who is youth team manager of 1. FC Köln.

== Playing career ==
Außem made Bundesliga debut with 1. FC Köln on 24 May 1980 against Werder Bremen, though he only played two minutes in his debut performance. He made his name in the eighties with SC Fortuna Köln.

== Managerial career ==
From 2002 to 2004 he managed SC Fortuna Köln. He later became manager of Rot-Weiss Essen.

In September 2011, he was named caretaker manager of Alemannia Aachen following the sacking of Peter Hyballa. After one game (a 0–0 against SpVgg Greuther Fürth), Friedhelm Funkel took the job and had it until 1 April 2012 when he was put on a leave, too. After that, Außem got the job again as a caretaker until the end of the 2011–12 season.
