= Jeff Gyasi =

Nigerian footballer

Personal information
- Date of birth: 4 January 1989 (age 37)
- Place of birth: Gladbeck, Germany
- Height: 1.90 m (6 ft 3 in)
- Positions: Centre-back; defensive midfielder

Youth career
- Rot-Weiß Oberhausen
- –2008: SG Wattenscheid 09

Senior career*
| Years | Team | Apps | (Gls) |
| 2008–2009 | SV Vorwärts Kornharpen | | |
| 2009–2010 | SpVgg Schonnebeck | | |
| 2010–2012 | Rot-Weiß Oberhausen II | | |
| 2011–2012 | Rot-Weiß Oberhausen | 29 | (0) |
| 2012–2014 | SV Wehen Wiesbaden | 21 | (0) |
| 2014 | SV Elversberg | 14 | (0) |
| 2014–2017 | BSV Schwarz-Weiß Rehden | 54 | (3) |
| 2017–2019 | SC Düsseldorf-West | 44 | (6) |
| 2019–2020 | FSV Duisburg | | |
| 2020–2021 | TuS Hordel | | |
| 2021–2022 | DJK Blau-Weiß Mintard | | |
- * Club domestic league appearances and goals

Jeff Gyasi (born 4 January 1989) is a German former professional footballer who played as a centre-back and defensive midfielder.

Gyasi made his professional debut for Rot-Weiß Oberhausen during the 2010–11 3. Fußball-Liga season in a 3–0 home loss to 1. FC Heidenheim.
