= Markus Müller (footballer) =

German footballer

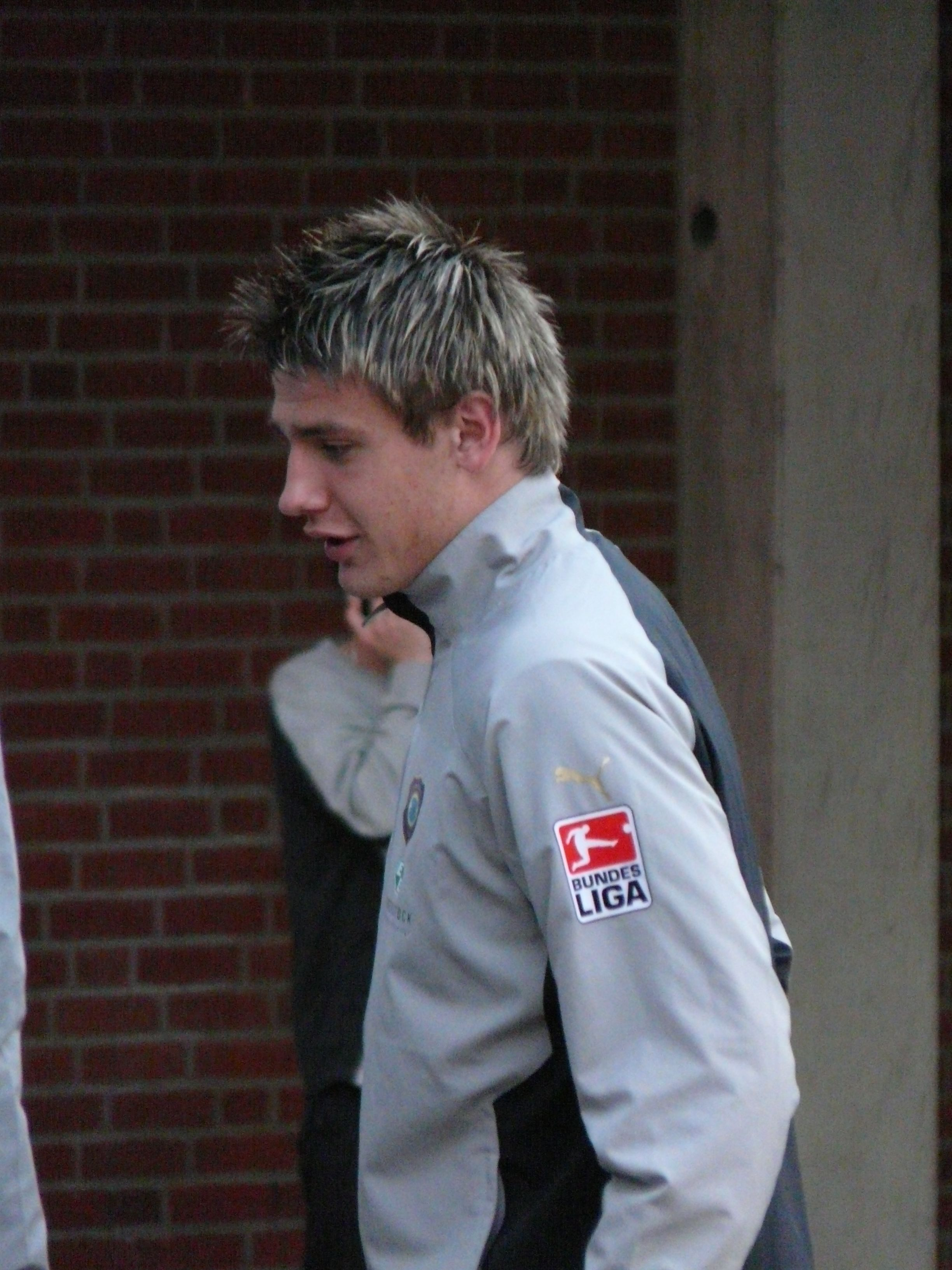
- Markus Müller

Personal information
- Date of birth: 22 May 1988 (age 38)
- Place of birth: Eberswalde, East Germany
- Height: 1.89 m (6 ft 2 1/2 in)
- Position: Forward

Team information
- Current team: TSV Wachtendonk-Wankum
- Number: 16

Youth career
- 1996–2000: ESV Zschorlau
- 2000–2007: Erzgebirge Aue

Senior career*
Years	Team	Apps	(Gls)
2005–2009	Erzgebirge Aue II	39	(30)
2007–2009	Erzgebirge Aue	5	(0)
2009–2011	Hallescher FC	54	(9)
2009–2011	Hallescher FC II	15	(17)
2011–2013	SV Babelsberg 03	67	(16)
2013–2014	Wormatia Worms	9	(2)
2014–2016	Kickers Offenbach	81	(30)
2016–2018	Teutonia Watzenborn-Steinberg	59	(23)
2018–2019	FC Gießen	30	(15)
2019–	TSV Wachtendonk-Wankum	29	(16)

Managerial career
- 2019–2020: TSV Wachtendonk-Wankum II
- 2020–: TSV Wachtendonk-Wankum (playing assistant)
- * Club domestic league appearances and goals as of 15 February 2921

Markus Müller (born 22 May 1988) is a German footballer who plays as a forward for TSV Wachtendonk-Wankum.

== Career ==
Müller began his career with Erzgebirge Aue, and made his debut in the 2. Bundesliga in April 2008, replacing Florian Heller in a 0–0 home draw with 1. FC Kaiserslautern. He left Aue in January 2009 to join Hallescher FC of the Regionalliga Nord, where he spent two and a half seasons, being released in June 2011 after injury had restricted him to just eight appearances in the previous season. He subsequently joined SV Babelsberg 03 of the 3. Liga, for whom he scored 12 goals in the 2011–12 season. After Babelsberg were relegated in the 2012–13 season, he left to sign for Wormatia Worms, where he spent six months before joining Kickers Offenbach.
