= Timo Staffeldt =

German footballer

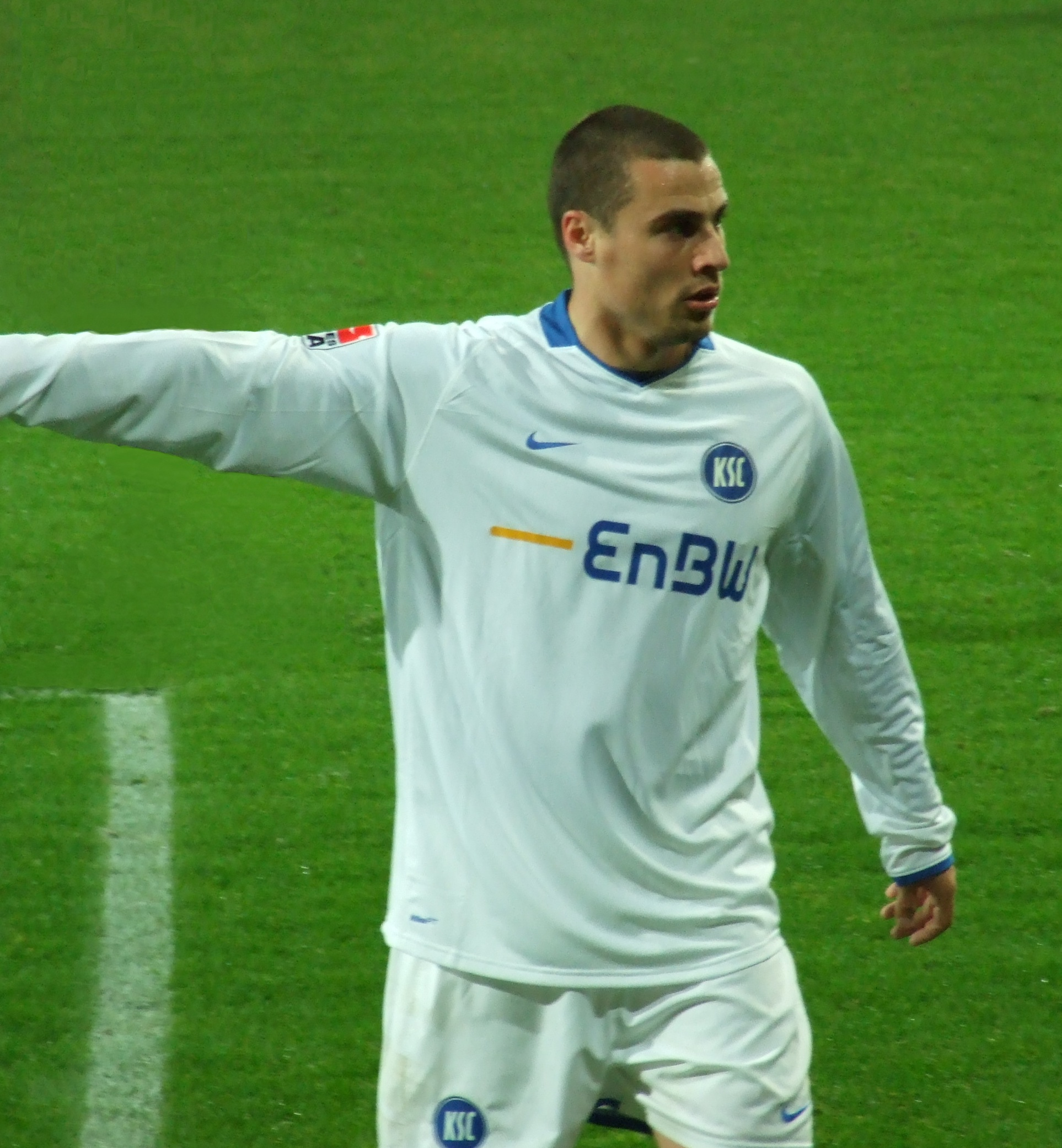
- Staffeldt playing for Karlsruher SC in 2010

Personal information
- Full name: Timo Staffeldt
- Date of birth: 9 February 1984 (age 42)
- Place of birth: Heidelberg, West Germany
- Height: 1.75 m (5 ft 9 in)
- Position: Midfielder

Youth career
- 1990–1996: SpVgg Ketsch
- 1996–2003: Karlsruher SC

Senior career*
Years	Team	Apps	(Gls)
2003–2009	Karlsruher SC II	84	(14)
2005–2012	Karlsruher SC	152	(9)
2012–2013	VfL Osnabrück	37	(9)
2013–2015	Viktoria Köln	50	(3)
2015–2017	Alemannia Aachen	66	(2)
Total		389	(37)
- * Club domestic league appearances and goals

Timo Staffeldt (born 9 February 1984) is a German former professional footballer who played as a midfielder.

== Career ==
Staffeldt began his career 1990 with six years for SpVgg Ketsch and played six years for the club's youth sides, before being scouted by Karlsruher SC in summer 1996. In the 2003–04 season he was promoted to the reserve team and two years later earned his first professional caps for the team.
