= Yannic Thiel =

German footballer

Personal information
- Date of birth: 22 October 1989 (age 37)
- Place of birth: Düsseldorf, West Germany
- Height: 1.85 m (6 ft 1 in)
- Position: Defensive midfielder

Youth career
- –2003: VfB 03 Hilden
- 2003–2006: SC Planegg

College career
Years	Team	Apps	(Gls)
2006–2011	Hastings Broncos		

Senior career*
Years	Team	Apps	(Gls)
2011–2012	SpVgg Unterhaching	37	(4)
2012–2014	VfL Osnabrück	35	(1)
2014–2015	SpVgg Unterhaching	32	(5)
2014	SpVgg Unterhaching II	2	(0)
2015–2017	FC Augsburg II	31	(4)
Total		137	(14)

Managerial career
- 2026: Hansa Rostock (interim)
- * Club domestic league appearances and goals

Yannic Thiel (born 22 October 1989) is a German former professional footballer who played as a defensive midfielder.
