= Peter Vollmann =

German footballer & manager (born 1957)

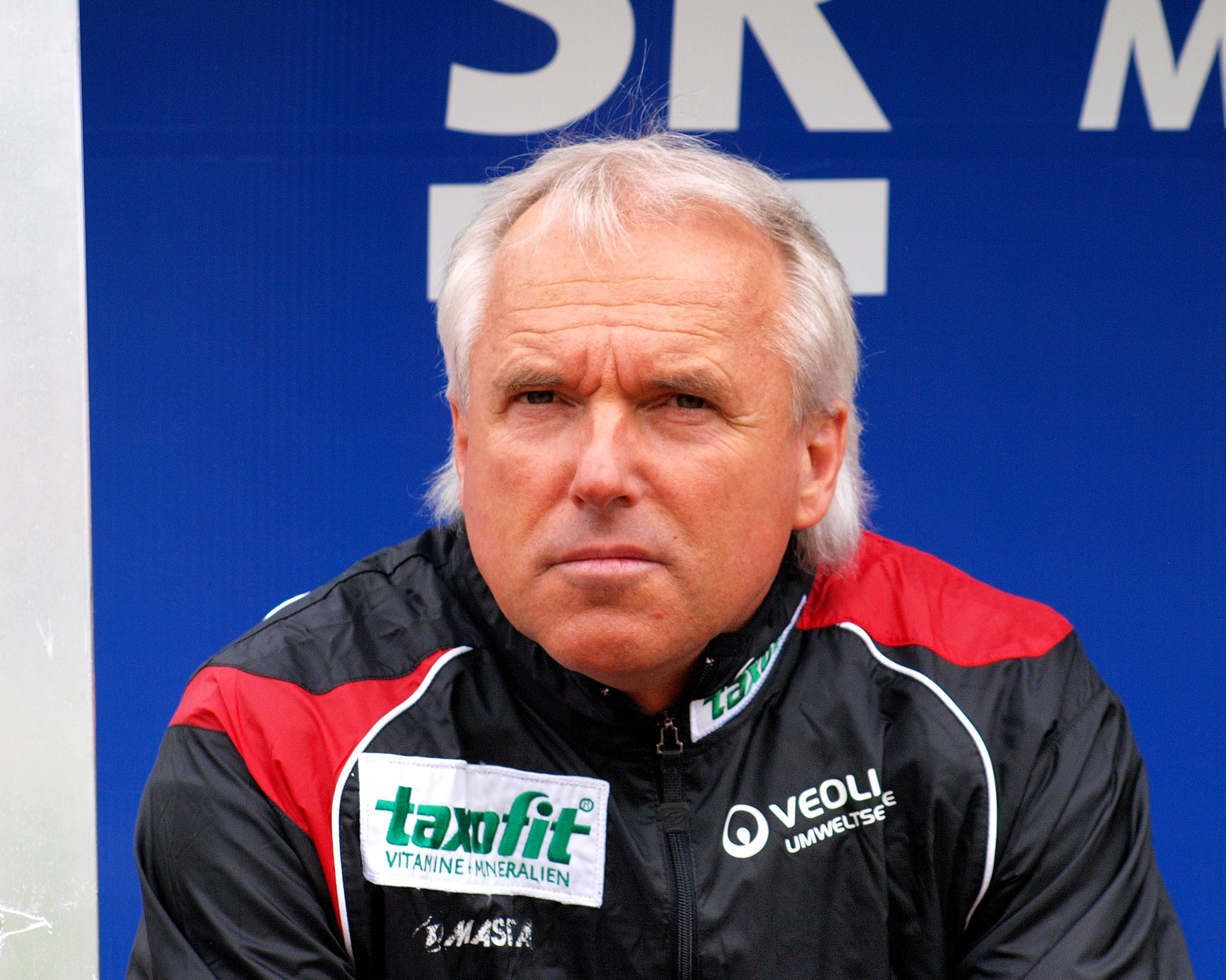
- Vollmann in 2011

Personal information
- Date of birth: 22 December 1957 (age 68)
- Place of birth: Linge, Marienheide, West Germany
- Position: Defender

Youth career
- SSV Marienheide

Senior career*
Years	Team	Apps	(Gls)
	Rot-Weiß Lüdenscheid	2	(0)
- SSV Marienheide
- TuS Lindlar

Managerial career
- 1993–1995: Rot-Weiß Lüdenscheid
- 1995–1996: Wattenscheid 09
- 1996–1998: Preußen Münster
- 1998–1999: Eintracht Trier
- 1999–2000: Uerdingen 05
- 2000–2001: Fortuna Köln
- 2001–2002: Eintracht Braunschweig
- 2002–2003: Preußen Münster
- 2004: Holstein Kiel
- 2006: Real Tamale United
- 2006: Real Sportive
- 2007–2008: Holstein Kiel
- 2010–2011: Hansa Rostock
- 2012–2013: Wehen Wiesbaden
- 2014: Hansa Rostock
- 2015–2018: VfR Aalen
- * Club domestic league appearances and goals

Peter Vollmann (born 22 December 1957) is a German former football player and manager who last managed VfR Aalen. As a player, he spent one season in the 2. Bundesliga with Rot-Weiß Lüdenscheid.

== Coaching career ==
=== Early career ===
Vollmann was head coach of Rot-Weiß Lüdenscheid between 1 July 1993 to 30 June 1995.

Vollmann was head coach of the reserve team of SG Wattenscheid 09 between 1 July 1995 and 30 October 1995. He won two of his 14 matches as head coach.

Vollmann was head coach of SG Wattenscheid 09 from 11 April 1996 to 30 June 1996. His first match was a 1–0 loss to Arminia Bielefeld. He won four of his 11 matches.

Vollmann was head coach of Preußen Münster from 1 July 1996 to 30 June 1998. His first match was a 1–0 win against SV Elversberg. They finished the season in fifth place. In the next season, they lost 3–2 against the reserve team of 1. FC Kaiserslautern. The team finished eighth in the league.

Vollmann was head coach of Eintracht Trier from 1 July 1998 to 6 October 1999. His first match was a 3–0 win against Rot-Weiß Oberhausen. He departed from the club on 6 October 1999, three days after a 1–1 draw against Preußen Münster. The club won six out of 12 matches.

Vollmann was head coach of KFC Uerdingen 05 from 1 November 1999 to 30 June 2000. His first match was a 1–1 loss to SC Verl. He won nine of his 19 matches.

Vollmann was head coach of Fortuna Köln for 1 July 2000 to 30 June 2001. His first match was a 2–2 draw against Borussia Dortmund II. They finished the season in fourth place and was knocked out of the German Cup in the first round by Bayer Leverkusen.

=== Eintracht Braunschweig ===
Vollmann was hired by Eintracht Braunschweig on 31 May 2001. His term started on 1 July 2001. His first match was a 4–0 win against the reserve team of Bayer Leverkusen. In the 2001–02 season, Eintracht Braunschweig finished in second place and was promoted to the 2. Bundesliga. In the 2002–03 season, Eintracht started with a 4–2 win against Waldhof Mannheim. This was followed by a 2–0 loss to Rot-Weiß Oberhausen. Then Eintracht's next two matches were against SSV Reutlingen 05 (once in the league and once in the cup). Both matches were lost by a 2–1 scoreline. His next three matches were all losses and were outscored 12–1. This includes a 7–1 loss to FC St. Pauli. He was sacked on 20 October 2002. He had lost to Karlsruher SC 2–1 earlier in the day.

=== Return to Preußen Münster ===
==== 2002–03 season ====
Vollmann returned to Preußen Münster on 19 December 2002. His first match in his return was a 3–0 loss to Rot-Weiss Essen on matchday 21, on 1 March 2003. Then Preußen Münster went on a five–match undefeated streak (four wins and one draw). Then, on matchday 27, on 19 April 2003, the undefeated streak finished with a 2–0 loss to Erzgebirge Aue. The team finished with a record of 3 wins, 2 draws, and two losses to close out the 2002–03 season. The club finished in 12th place in the league table.

==== 2003–04 season ====
Vollmann was sacked on 10 November 2003, two days after losing to Eintracht Braunschweig. Preußen Münster was in the relegation zone at 17th place with a record of one win, five draws, nine losses, and eight points at the time of the sacking.

=== Holstein Kiel ===
Vollmann was named head coach of Holstein Kiel on 26 February 2004 and was in that position until 30 June 2004 when Frank Neubarth became head coach. His first match was a 3–0 loss to KFC Uerdingen 05 on 28 February 2004. He was head coach for 15 matches; winning five. Holstein Kiel finished the season in 12th place.

=== Return to Holstein Kiel ===
==== 2006–07 season ====
He returned to Holstein Kiel as Sporting Director in the 2006–07 season. On 26 February 2007, he sacked Stefan Böger and appointed himself as head coach. His first match as head coach was a 1–1 draw against VfB Lübeck. At the end of the season, Holsten Kiel were tied with Union Berlin, Rot Weiss Ahlen, and Borussia Dortmund II with 48 points. However, Holsten Kiel lost the tiebreaker scenario and were relegated to the Oberliga.

==== 2007–08 season ====
Despite the relegation, Vollmann remained as head coach. Holstein Kiel started the 2007–08 season with a 5–0 loss to Hamburger SV in the German Cup on 5 August 2007. The season included an 8–0 win against VSK Osterholz-Scharmbeck and two nine–match undefeated streak from 10 August 2007 to 5 October 2007 and from 19 October 2007 to 2 March 2008. To start the 2008–09 season, Holstein Kiel lost to Hansa Rostock in the German Cup. They were promoted after winning North division of the Oberliga.

==== 2008–09 season ====
Falko Götz and Andreas Thom replaced Vollmann on 31 December 2008.

=== Hansa Rostock ===
Hansa Rostock hired Vollmann on 31 May 2010. His first match was a 3–0 win against VfR Aalen, on matchday one, on 24 July 2010. Then they won two and lost one over their next three matches. Hansa Rostock faced 1899 Hoffenheim in the 2010–11 German Cup which Hoffenheim won 4–0. After this, Hansa Rostock went on a four–match undefeated streak. They finished the 2010–11 season with a 2–0 win against Rot Weiss Ahlen. They finished in second place and won promotion to the 2. Bundesliga. Vollmann was sacked on 6 December 2011, three days after losing 3–0 to Greuther Fürth. Hansa Rostock was on a six–match winless streak at the time of the sacking.

=== Wehen Wiesebaden ===
Vollmann replaced Gino Lettieri on 16 February 2012. His first match was a 4–0 win against SV Sandhausen on 18 February 2012. He started his tenure with a five–match winless streak (two draws and three losses). His first victory was a 3–2 win against 1. FC Saarbrücken on 17 March 2012. The club finished the 2011–12 season in 16th place. In the 2012–13 season, the club got to the Hesse Cup final where they lost to SV Darmstadt 98 4–0. They also finished in seventh place in the league. He was sacked on 21 October 2013, two days after losing 2–0 to SpVgg Unterhaching. They were on a five–match winless streak at the time of the sacking. He had won 20 of his 65 league matches as head coach.

=== Return to Hansa Rostock ===
==== 2014–15 season ====
Vollmann was announced as Dirk Lottner's replacement on 13 May 2014. His first match in his return was a 4–3 win against Preußen Münster on matchday one, on 27 July 2014. He then failed to win any of his next five matches (two draws and three losses). Then they won 2–0 against 1. FSV Mainz 05 II before losing their next two matches. Then they defeated Aeminia Bielefeld 4–2. After this, they went on a six–match winless streak which finished with a 4–1 win against VfB Stuttgart II. He was sacked on 7 December 2014.

=== VfR Aalen ===
He was appointed as the head coach of VfR Aalen on 12 June 2015. He made his debut on 25 July 2015 against Chemnitzer FC. The match finished in a 0–0 draw. His spell ended in 2018.

== Managerial record ==
As of 15 March 2016

Team	From	To	Record								
Team	From	To	M	W	D	L	GF	GA	GD	Win %	Ref.
Rot-Weiß Lüdenscheid	1 July 1993	30 June 1995					0	0	+0		
Wattenscheid 09 II	1 July 1995	30 October 1995	14	2	4	8	18	29	−11	14.29	
Wattenscheid 09	11 April 1996	30 June 1996	11	4	1	6	10	17	−7	36.36	
Preußen Münster	1 July 1996	30 June 1998	69	28	23	18	111	82	+29	40.58	
Eintracht Trier	1 July 1998	6 October 1999	51	24	17	10	82	51	+31	47.06	
Uerdingen 05	1 November 1999	30 June 2000	19	9	3	7	52	52	+0	47.37	
Fortuna Köln	1 July 2000	30 June 2001	37	18	8	11	58	46	+12	48.65	
Eintracht Braunschweig	1 July 2001	20 October 2002	44	20	8	16	71	56	+15	45.45	
Preußen Münster	19 December 2002	10 November 2003	29	8	8	13	30	42	−12	27.59	
Holstein Kiel	26 February 2004	30 June 2004	15	5	3	7	20	21	−1	33.33	
Real Tamale United	30 January 2006	30 April 2006	0	0	0	0	0	0	+0	—	
Real Sportive							0	0	+0		
Holstein Kiel	26 February 2007	31 December 2008	68	40	15	13	122	67	+55	58.82	
Hansa Rostock	31 May 2010	6 December 2011	57	25	15	17	81	66	+15	43.86	
Wehen Wiesbaden	16 February 2012	21 October 2013	67	20	27	20	32	38	−6	29.85	
Hansa Rostock	13 May 2014	7 December 2014	20	4	5	11	27	38	−11	20.00	
Aalen	12 June 2015	Present	31	8	14	9	27	28	−1	25.81	
Total			524	211	151	162	741	634	+107	40.27	—
