= Josef Çınar =

German football manager (born 1984)

Personal information
- Date of birth: 22 January 1984 (age 42)
- Place of birth: Bremen, West Germany
- Height: 1.94 m (6 ft 4 in)
- Position: Centre back

Team information
- Current team: Berdenia Berburg (head coach)

Youth career
- FC Gütersloh
- –2002: VfB Fichte Bielefeld

Senior career*
Years	Team	Apps	(Gls)
2002–2004	VfB Fichte Bielefeld	42	(2)
2004–2008	SC Verl	115	(4)
2008–2011	Eintracht Trier	92	(3)
2011–2013	Wacker Burghausen	72	(5)
2013–2014	Chemnitzer FC	16	(1)
2014	Kayseri Erciyesspor	4	(0)
2014–2017	Gaziantep BB	33	(0)
2017–2018	Eintracht Trier	55	(3)
Total		429	(18)

Managerial career
- 2018–2023: Eintracht Trier
- 2024–: Berdenia Berburg
- * Club domestic league appearances and goals

Josef Çınar (born 22 January 1984) is a German former professional footballer, who played as a defender, and the head coach of Luxembourgish club Berdenia Berburg.

== Playing career ==
In January 2017, Çınar returned to his former club Eintracht Trier signing a 2 1/2-year contract.

== Managerial career ==
In October 2018, Çınar ended his playing career and took over Eintracht Trier as a caretaker manager. He was later officially confirmed as the permanent manager of the club.

In January 2024, he was appointed head coach of Luxembourg Division of Honour club Berdenia Berburg.
