= Andreas Glockner =

German footballer

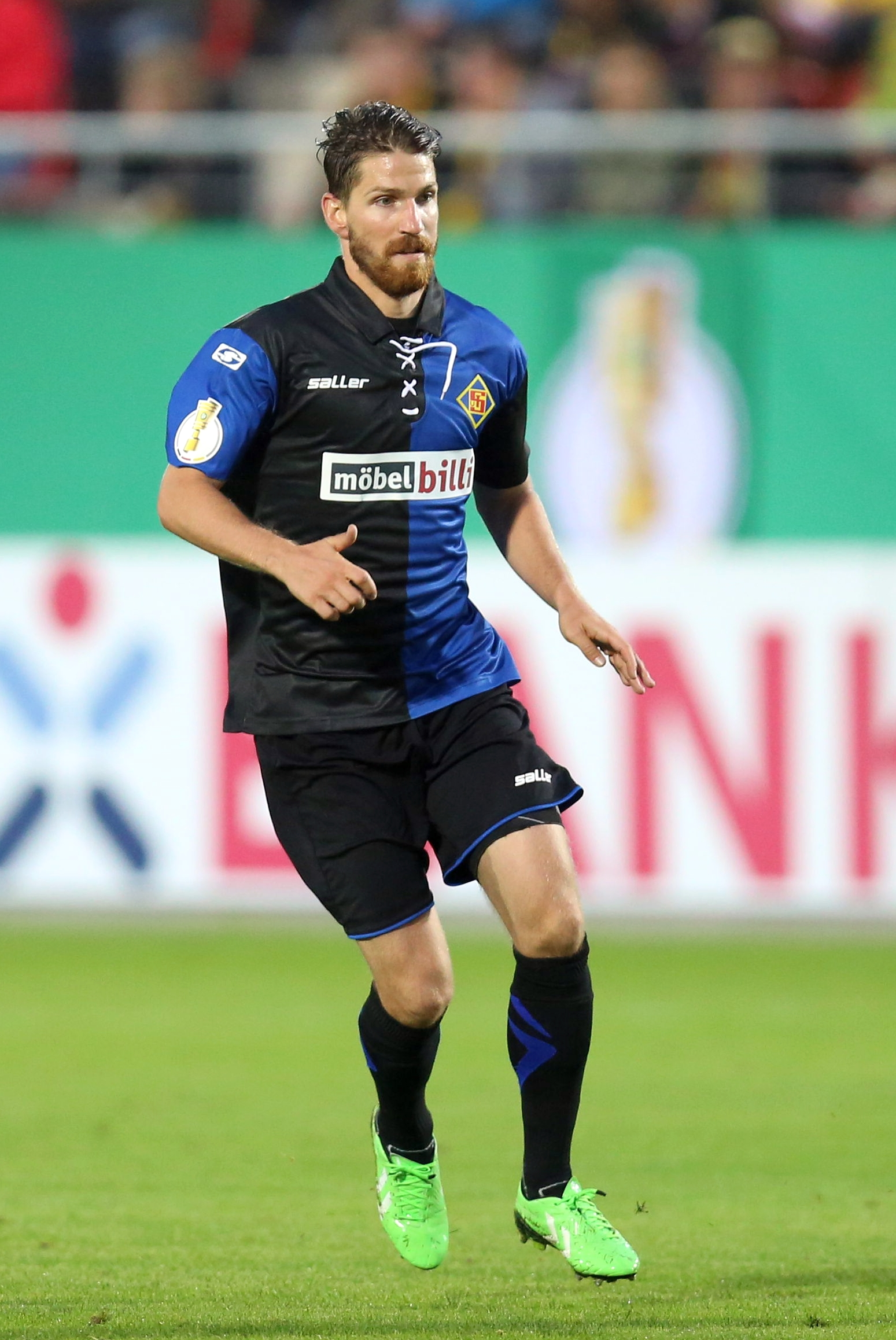
- Glockner in 2017

Personal information
- Date of birth: 25 February 1988 (age 38)
- Place of birth: Titisee-Neustadt, West Germany
- Height: 1.82 m (6 ft 0 in)
- Position: Left winger

Youth career
- SpVgg Bollschweil Sölden
- –1998: Eintracht Freiburg
- 1998–2006: SC Freiburg

Senior career*
| Years | Team | Apps | (Gls) |
| 2006–2010 | SC Freiburg II | 48 | (5) |
| 2008–2010 | SC Freiburg | 26 | (2) |
| 2010 | → TuS Koblenz (loan) | 15 | (2) |
| 2010–2011 | FC Heidenheim | 19 | (0) |
| 2011–2013 | VfL Osnabrück | 57 | (6) |
| 2013–2014 | FC Saarbrücken | 2 | (0) |
| 2014–2015 | VfL Osnabrück | 21 | (0) |
| 2015–2016 | Fortuna Köln | 37 | (1) |
| 2016–2018 | TuS Koblenz | 62 | (9) |
| 2018–2019 | Wormatia Worms | 23 | (1) |
| Total | | 310 | (26) |

International career
| 2003–2004 | Germany U-16 | 3 | (1) |
| 2004–2005 | Germany U-17 | 8 | (2) |
| 2005–2006 | Germany U-18 | 9 | (2) |
| 2008 | Germany U-20 | 1 | (0) |
- * Club domestic league appearances and goals

Andreas Glockner (born 25 February 1988) is a German former professional footballer who played as a left winger.

== Career ==
Glockner was born in Titisee-Neustadt. He began his career with SpVgg Bollschweil Sölden and joined later Eintracht Freiburg. He played a few years for Eintracht Freiburg and was then scouted by SC Freiburg. Glockner played eight years for SC Freiburg's youth teams and was in July 2006 promoted to the Bundesliga team. After three and a half years for SC Freiburg as a professional he was loaned to TuS Koblenz in January 2010.

He retired as a player after the 2018–19 season.
