= Malte Nieweler =

German footballer

Personal information
- Full name: Malte Nieweler
- Date of birth: 10 April 1994 (age 32)
- Place of birth: Neuenkirchen, Germany
- Height: 1.83 m (6 ft 0 in)
- Position: Forward

Team information
- Current team: SuS Neuenkirchen
- Number: 20

Youth career
- –2007: SuS Neuenkirchen
- 2007–2010: Eintracht Rheine
- 2010–2013: VfL Osnabrück

Senior career*
Years	Team	Apps	(Gls)
2012–2014	VfL Osnabrück II	31	(14)
2013–2014	VfL Osnabrück	2	(0)
2014–2015	Viktoria Köln	1	(0)
2014	Viktoria Köln II	3	(6)
2015	Sportfreunde Siegen	14	(2)
2015–	SuS Neuenkirchen	101	(46)
2015–	SuS Neuenkirchen II	2+	(0)
- * Club domestic league appearances and goals as of 06:26, 27 November 2018 (UTC)

Malte Nieweler (born 10 April 1994) is a German footballer who plays as a forward for SuS Neuenkirchen.

== Career ==
Nieweler made his professional debut for VfL Osnabrück in the 3. Liga on 25 March 2014, coming on as a substitute in the 65th minute for Pascal Testroet in the 0–1 away loss against Wehen Wiesbaden.
