= Michael Gurski =

German football coach and player (born 1979)

Personal information
- Date of birth: 21 March 1979 (age 47)
- Place of birth: Tübingen, West Germany
- Height: 1.89 m (6 ft 2 in)
- Position: Goalkeeper

Team information
- Current team: RB Leipzig (women) (goalkeeping coach)

Youth career
- –1993: SF Dußlingen
- 1993–1996: Stuttgarter Kickers
- 1996–1998: SSV Reutlingen

Senior career*
Years	Team	Apps	(Gls)
1998–2001	SSV Reutlingen	3	(0)
2001–2003	SpVgg Unterhaching	10	(0)
2004	Borussia Fulda		
2004–2008	TuS Koblenz	69	(0)
2008–2010	SV Sandhausen	55	(0)
2010–2014	SV Wehen Wiesbaden	122	(0)
2014–2015	SSV Reutlingen	17	(0)
2015	Arminia Bielefeld	0	(0)
2016	Sonnenhof Großaspach	0	(0)
2017–2018	VfB Eichstätt	9	(0)
2018–2022	SpVgg Unterhaching	0	(0)
- * Club domestic league appearances and goals

Michael Gurski (born 21 March 1979) is a German former professional footballer who played as a goalkeeper. He works as a goalkeeping coach for RB Leipzig women's team.

== Career ==
Born in Tübingen, Gurski started his senior career with Stuttgarter Kickers, then SSV Reutlingen 05. Between 2001 and December 2003, he played for Kickers Offenbach, two games in the 2. Bundesliga and 10 in the Regionalliga Süd. He could not beat keeper Philipp Heerwagen to the number one spot, and moved to Borussia Fulda in January 2004.

After half a year in Fulda, he moved to TuS Koblenz where he played until summer 2008. In 2006, he was in the team that got promoted to the 2. Bundesliga. Eventually he lost his number one spot, and he was released on a free transfer. On 1 July 2008, he signed for SV Sandhausen. He moved to SSV Reutlingen in 2014.

In summer 2018 Gurski left VfB Eichstätt for SpVgg Unterhaching. In 2019, aged 40, he agreed a two-year contract extension with Unterhaching.

== After retiring ==
After retiring in the summer 2015, Gurski signed with SG Sonnenhof Großaspach as goalkeeper coach.

== Honours ==
TuS Koblenz

- Promotion to 2. Bundesliga: 2006
