= Milan Ivana =

Slovak former professional footballer (born 1983)

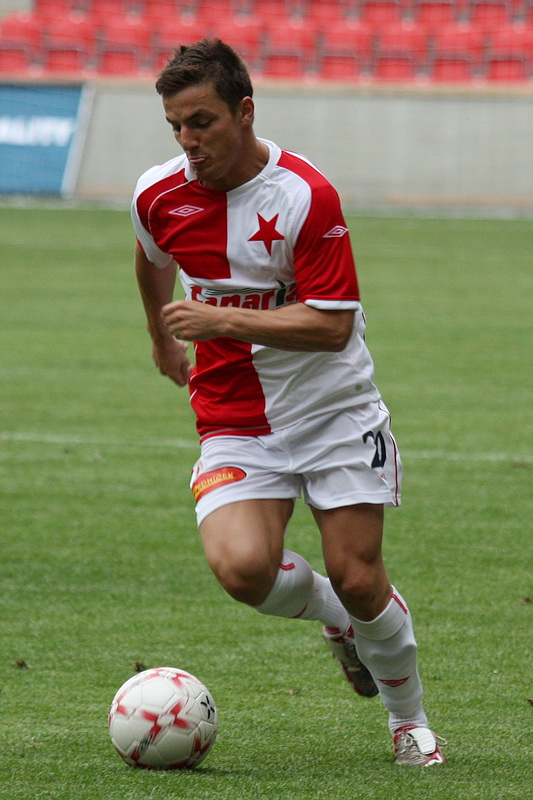
- Ivana in 2008

Personal information
- Date of birth: 26 November 1983 (age 42)
- Place of birth: Kálnica, Czechoslovakia
- Height: 1.70 m (5 ft 7 in)
- Positions: Winger; forward

Youth career
- 1990–1994: Zavažan Kálnica
- 1994–1998: Považan Nové Mesto n/V.

Senior career*
Years	Team	Apps	(Gls)
1998–2003	AS Trenčín	56	(12)
2004–2007	1. FC Slovácko	94	(22)
2007–2009	Slavia Praha	34	(5)
2009–2011	Slovan Bratislava	42	(4)
2012–2013	Wehen Wiesbaden	48	(6)
2013–2016	Darmstadt 98	57	(5)
2016–2017	SV Elversberg	15	(0)
2017–2018	SV Röchling Völklingen	25	(8)
Total		371	(62)

International career
2004	Slovakia	2	(0)
- * Club domestic league appearances and goals

Milan Ivana (born 26 November 1983) is a Slovak former professional footballer who played as a winger or forward.

== Honours ==
Slovakia U19

- UEFA European Under-19 Championship: third place 2002
