= Claus Costa =

German footballer

Personal information
- Date of birth: 15 June 1984 (age 42)
- Place of birth: Fürstenfeldbruck, West Germany
- Height: 1.90 m (6 ft 3 in)
- Position: Defensive midfielder

Team information
- Current team: Viktoria Köln
- Number: 4

Youth career
- TuS Wengern
- –1998: Borussia Dortmund
- 1998–2003: VfL Bochum

Senior career*
| Years | Team | Apps | (Gls) |
| 2003–2006 | VfL Bochum II | 78 | (20) |
| 2006–2011 | Fortuna Düsseldorf | 114 | (2) |
| 2007 | → Fortuna Düsseldorf II | 3 | (0) |
| 2011–2013 | VfL Osnabrück | 67 | (5) |
| 2013–2016 | Viktoria Köln | 74 | (5) |

Managerial career
- 2016: Viktoria Köln
- * Club domestic league appearances and goals as of 10 June 2016

Claus Costa (born 15 June 1984) is a German footballer who last played for Viktoria Köln.

| Club performance | | | League | | Cup | | Total | |
| Season | Club | League | Apps | Goals | Apps | Goals | Apps | Goals |
| Germany | | | League | | DFB-Pokal | | Total | |
|---|---|---|---|---|---|---|---|---|
| 2003–04 | VfL Bochum II | Oberliga Westfalen | 16 | 2 | — | | 16 | 2 |
| 2004–05 | VfL Bochum II | Oberliga Westfalen | 31 | 7 | — | | 31 | 7 |
| 2005–06 | VfL Bochum II | Oberliga Westfalen | 31 | 11 | 1 | 0 | 32 | 11 |
| 2006–07 | Fortuna Düsseldorf | Regionalliga Nord | 14 | 0 | — | | 14 | 0 |
| 2007–08 | Fortuna Düsseldorf | Regionalliga Nord | 20 | 0 | — | | 20 | 0 |
| 2007–08 | Fortuna Düsseldorf II | Oberliga Nordrhein | 3 | 1 | — | | 3 | 1 |
| 2008–09 | Fortuna Düsseldorf | 3. Liga | 25 | 2 | — | | 25 | 2 |
| 2009–10 | Fortuna Düsseldorf | 2. Bundesliga | 31 | 0 | 0 | 0 | 31 | 0 |
| 2010–11 | Fortuna Düsseldorf | 2. Bundesliga | 24 | 0 | 1 | 0 | 25 | 0 |
| 2011–12 | VfL Osnabrück | 3. Liga | 35 | 1 | 1 | 0 | 36 | 1 |
| 2012–13 | VfL Osnabrück | 3. Liga | 3 | 0 | 0 | 0 | 3 | 0 |
| 2013–14 | FC Viktoria Köln | Regionalliga West | 9 | 1 | — | | 9 | 1 |
| Total | Germany | | 242 | 25 | 3 | 0 | 245 | 25 |
| Career total | | | 242 | 25 | 3 | 0 | 245 | 25 |
