= Carsten Sträßer =

German footballer

Personal information
- Full name: Carsten Sträßer
- Date of birth: 5 July 1980 (age 46)
- Place of birth: East Berlin, East Germany
- Height: 1.75 m (5 ft 9 in)
- Position: Midfielder

Youth career
- 1985–1986: Union Berlin
- 1986–1998: Carl Zeiss Jena

Senior career*
| Years | Team | Apps | (Gls) |
| 1998–1999 | Carl Zeiss Jena | 24 | (1) |
| 1999–2001 | Hertha BSC II | 61 | (3) |
| 2001–2003 | Rot-Weiß Erfurt | 59 | (4) |
| 2003–2004 | Jahn Regensburg | 18 | (1) |
| 2004–2007 | SpVgg Unterhaching | 95 | (5) |
| 2007–2008 | Erzgebirge Aue | 32 | (1) |
| 2008–2010 | Carl Zeiss Jena | 66 | (1) |
| 2010–2013 | Chemnitzer FC | 89 | (1) |
| 2013–2014 | Wormatia Worms | 14 | (0) |
| Total | | 458 | (17) |
- * Club domestic league appearances and goals

Carsten Sträßer (born 5 July 1980) is a German former professional footballer who played as a midfielder.

== Career ==
Sträßer was born in East Berlin.

He joined Chemnitzer FC from Carl Zeiss Jena in 2010.

== Personal life ==
He is the son of the East Germany national player Ralf Sträßer.
