= David Pisot =

German footballer (born 1987)

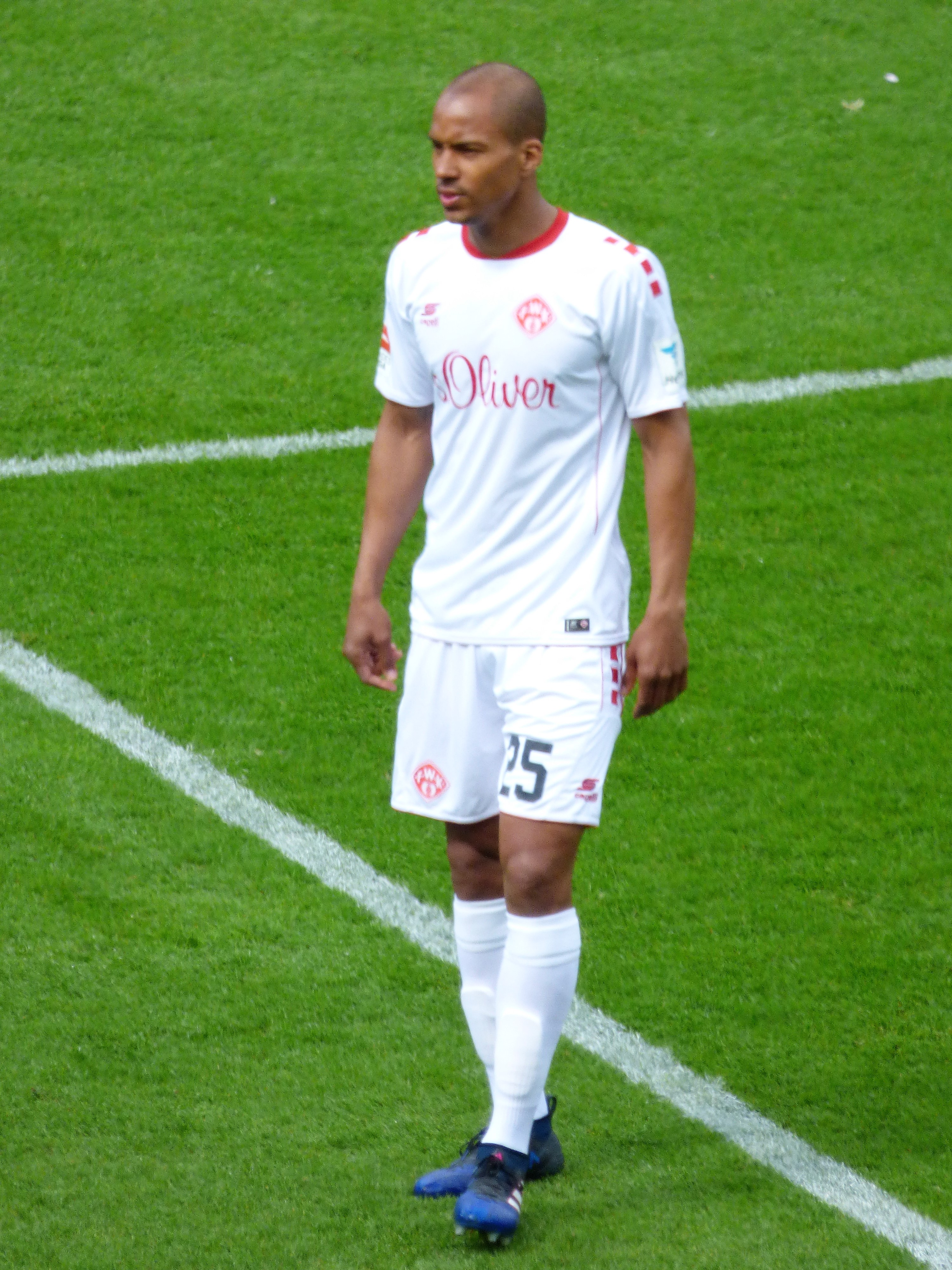
- Pisot with Würzburger Kickers in 2017

Personal information
- Date of birth: 6 July 1987 (age 39)
- Place of birth: Karlsruhe, West Germany
- Height: 1.85 m (6 ft 1 in)
- Position: Centre-back

Team information
- Current team: SGV Freiberg
- Number: 3

Youth career
- 1992–2001: FC Rot
- 2001–2002: SV Sandhausen
- 2002–2003: Karlsruher SC
- 2003–2006: VfB Stuttgart

Senior career*
Years	Team	Apps	(Gls)
2006–2009	VfB Stuttgart II	60	(0)
2007	VfB Stuttgart	1	(0)
2008	→ SC Paderborn (loan)	5	(0)
2009–2012	FC Ingolstadt 04	70	(3)
2012–2016	VfL Osnabrück	149	(10)
2016–2017	Würzburger Kickers	31	(3)
2017–2021	Karlsruher SC	107	(5)
2021–2023	SpVgg Unterhaching	73	(3)
2023–	SGV Freiberg	51	(2)

International career^{‡}
2006	Germany U19	4	(0)
- * Club domestic league appearances and goals as of 1 January 2025 ‡ National team caps and goals as of 29 January 2017

David Pisot (born 6 July 1987) is a German professional footballer who plays as a centre-back for Regionalliga Südwest club SGV Freiberg.

== Club career ==
In October 2007 he was promoted to the first team of VfB Stuttgart. He had his professional debut on 20 October 2007 against Hamburger SV.

On 24 January 2008, Pisot was loaned out to SC Paderborn 07 until the end of the season. In July 2008 he returned to the second team of VfB Stuttgart. On 29 May 2009, he signed a contract with FC Ingolstadt 04 and joined his new club on 1 July 2009.

== International career ==
Pisot was born in Germany to an African-American father and German mother, and adopted by his nurses. Pisot is a youth international for Germany at the U19 level.
