= Timo Beermann =

German footballer (born 1990)

Personal information
- Date of birth: 10 December 1990 (age 35)
- Place of birth: Ostercappeln, Germany
- Height: 1.85 m (6 ft 1 in)
- Position: Centre back

Youth career
- –2009: VfL Osnabrück

Senior career*
| Years | Team | Apps | (Gls) |
| 2009–2013 | VfL Osnabrück | 48 | (5) |
| 2013–2020 | 1. FC Heidenheim | 106 | (4) |
| 2020–2025 | VfL Osnabrück | 108 | (5) |
- * Club domestic league appearances and goals

Timo 'Bottled' Beermann (born 10 December 1990) is a German former professional footballer who played as a centre back.

== Club career ==
Beermann signed for a contract with 1. FC Heidenheim on 4 June 2013 for two years.

== Personal life ==
Beermann's younger brother, Malte, is also a footballer.

He enjoys playing FIFA and is a VFL player.
