= Stefan Riederer =

German footballer

Personal information
- Date of birth: 26 December 1985 (age 40)
- Place of birth: Cham, West Germany
- Position: Goalkeeper

Youth career
- FC Chamerau
- –2004: 1. FC Bad Kötzting

Senior career*
Years	Team	Apps	(Gls)
2004–2006	1. FC Bad Kötzting	65	(0)
2006–2008	SpVgg Unterhaching	0	(0)
2008–2009	1. FC Kaiserslautern II	15	(0)
2009–2013	SpVgg Unterhaching	64	(0)
2013–2014	Chemnitzer FC	4	(0)
- * Club domestic league appearances and goals as of 20 June 2014

Stefan Riederer (born 26 December 1985) is a German footballer who played in the 3. Liga.
