= Gaetano Manno =

German-Italian footballer

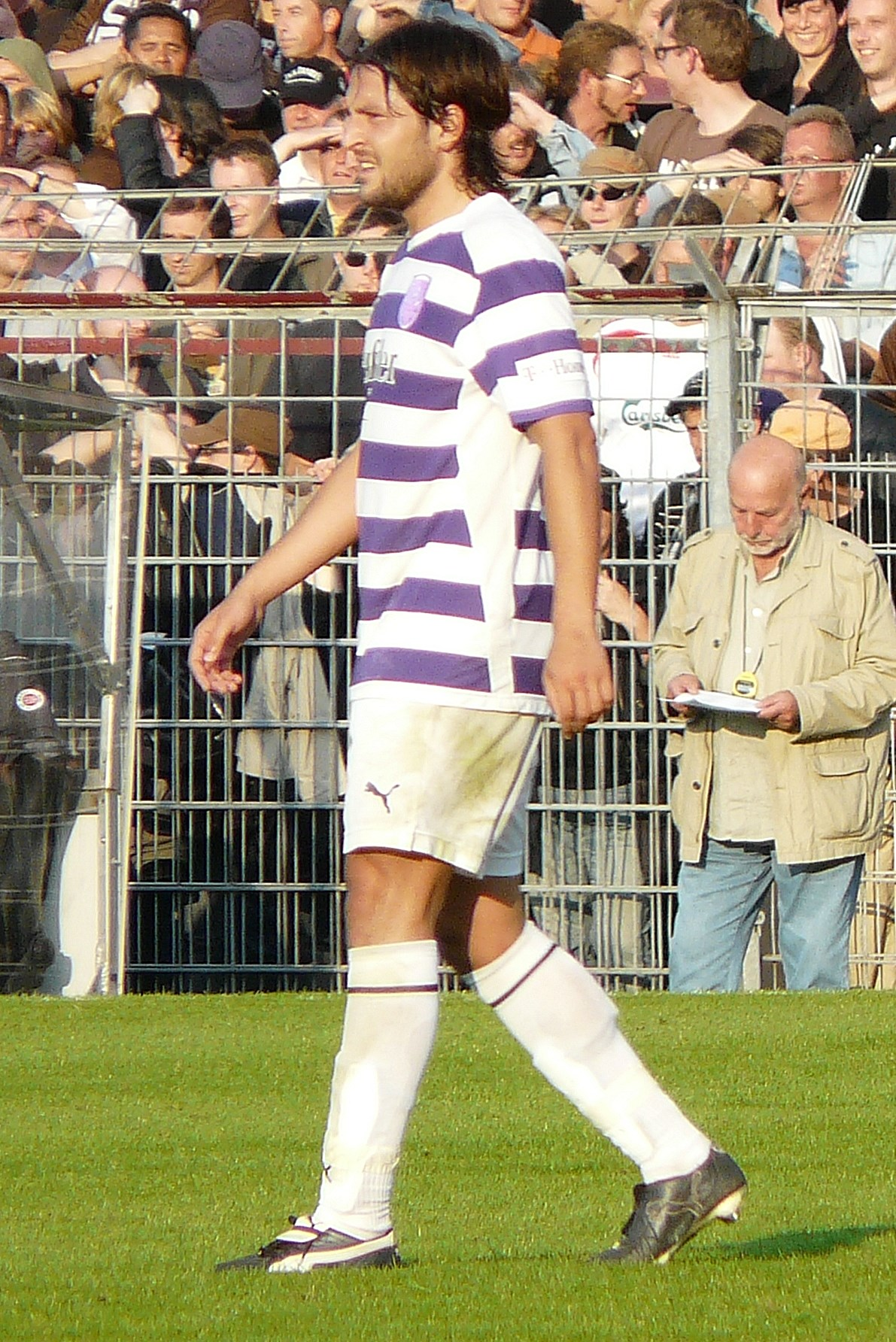
- Manno with VfL Osnabrück in 2008

Personal information
- Date of birth: 26 July 1982 (age 44)
- Place of birth: Hagen, West Germany
- Height: 1.75 m (5 ft 9 in)
- Position: Midfielder

Youth career
- –2001: SSV Hagen

Senior career*
| Years | Team | Apps | (Gls) |
| 2001–2002 | TSG Sprockhövel | 28 | (25) |
| 2002–2005 | VfL Bochum II | 86 | (33) |
| 2004–2005 | VfL Bochum | 2 | (0) |
| 2005–2007 | Wuppertaler SV Borussia | 53 | (15) |
| 2007–2009 | VfL Osnabrück | 34 | (4) |
| 2009–2011 | SC Paderborn | 29 | (5) |
| 2011–2012 | Rot-Weiß Erfurt | 27 | (4) |
| 2012–2013 | VfL Osnabrück | 32 | (8) |
| 2013–2014 | Preußen Münster | 17 | (2) |
| 2014–2015 | Viktoria Köln | 33 | (1) |
| 2015–2019 | Wuppertaler SV | 76 | (22) |
| Total | | 417 | (119) |

Managerial career
- 2018–2019: Wuppertaler SV (player-assistant)
- * Club domestic league appearances and goals

Gaetano Manno (born 26 July 1982) is a German former professional footballer who played as a midfielder. Manno holds both German and Italian citizenship.

== Career ==
Manno was born in Hagen. At the end of the winter break of the 2013–14 season, he left 3. Liga side Preußen Münster in spite of having signed a long-term contract just the summer before. He joined fourth tier Regionalliga West club Viktoria Köln on a two-and-a-half-year deal until 2016. Köln paid a transfer fee to Münster.

In May 2018 it was announced, that Gaetano had got his contract with Wuppertaler SV extended with one year and from the new season would function as a playing assistant manager.

== Personal life ==
On 20 May 2019, it was confirmed, that Manno would join lower-league side SpVg Hagen 11 from the 2019–20 season.
