= Marco Christ =

German footballer (born 1980)

Personal information
- Date of birth: 6 November 1980 (age 45)
- Place of birth: Nuremberg, West Germany
- Height: 1.72 m (5 ft 8 in)
- Position: Midfielder

Youth career
- –1996: SV 73 Süd Nürnberg
- 1996–1997: FC Bayern Munich
- 1997–1998: 1. FC Nürnberg

Senior career*
Years	Team	Apps	(Gls)
1998–2001	1. FC Nürnberg II	76	(39)
1999–2001	1. FC Nürnberg	2	(0)
2001–2002	Jahn Regensburg	5	(0)
2002–2004	1. SC Feucht	47	(27)
2004–2005	Dynamo Dresden	21	(0)
2005–2007	VfR Aalen	60	(14)
2007–2011	Fortuna Düsseldorf	96	(18)
2011–2014	SV Wehen Wiesbaden	61	(3)
2014–2017	SV Seligenporten	82	(10)
Total		450	(111)

International career
2000	Germany U-21	1	(0)
- * Club domestic league appearances and goals

Marco Christ (born 6 November 1980) is a German former professional football who played as a midfielder.
