= Johannes Rahn =

German footballer

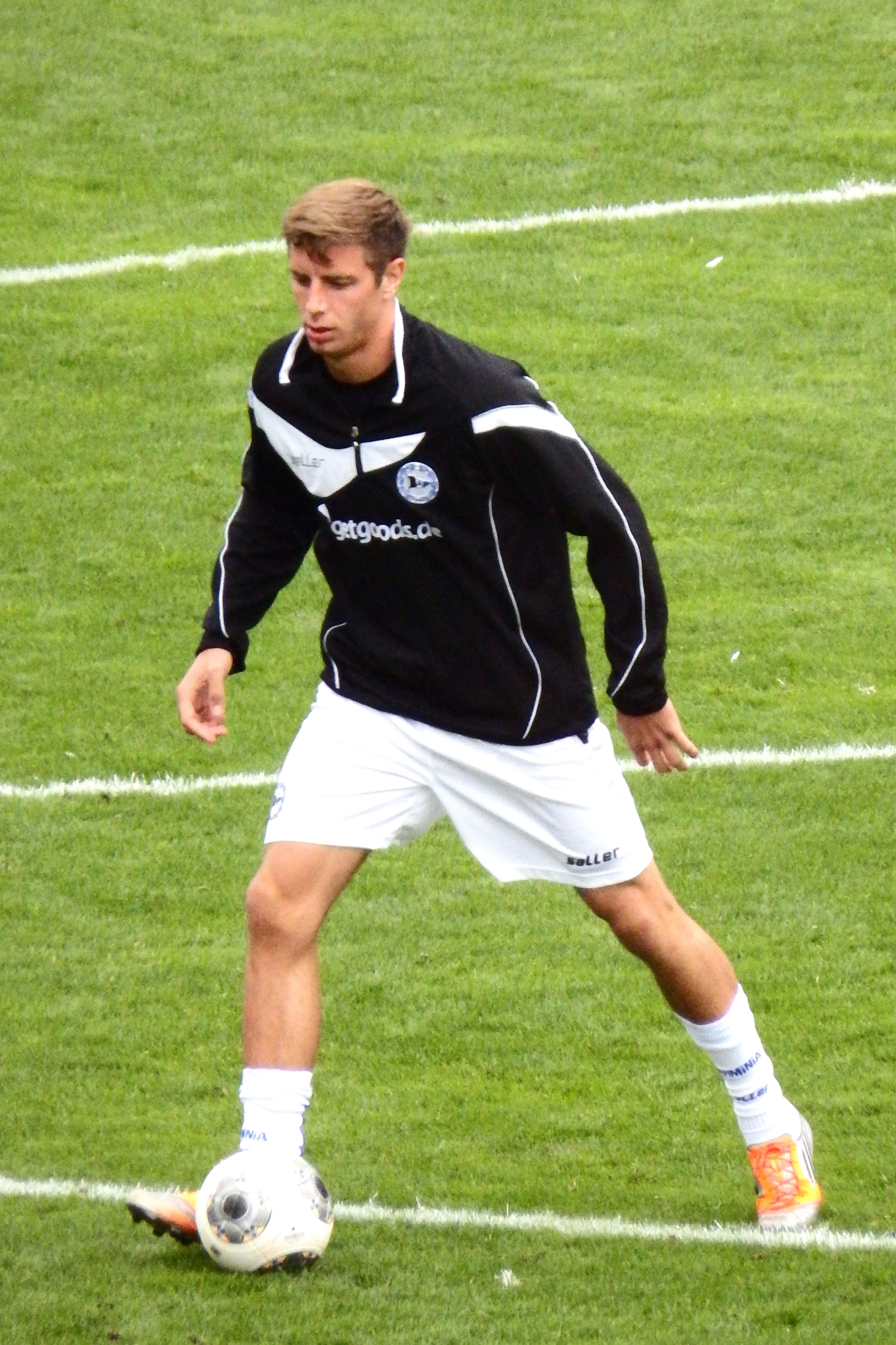

Personal information
- Full name: Johannes Rahn
- Date of birth: 16 January 1986 (age 40)
- Place of birth: Hachenburg, West Germany
- Height: 1.90 m (6 ft 3 in)
- Position: Forward

Team information
- Current team: Eintracht Windhagen
- Number: 13

Youth career
- –2002: JSG Alpenrod/Nistertal
- 2002–2003: VfL Hamm/Sieg
- 2003–2004: TuS Koblenz

Senior career*
Years	Team	Apps	(Gls)
2004–2007	TuS Koblenz	56	(3)
2007–2009	VfB Stuttgart II	59	(11)
2009–2011	TuS Koblenz	49	(4)
2011–2014	Arminia Bielefeld	78	(16)
2014–2017	Fortuna Köln	77	(13)
2017–2018	SV Elversberg	9	(0)
2018–	Eintracht Windhagen	37	(14)
- * Club domestic league appearances and goals as of 19 February 2021

Johannes Rahn (born 16 January 1986 in Hachenburg) is a German footballer who plays for SV Eintracht Windhagen.

Rahn made his professional debut for TuS Koblenz during the first round of fixtures of the 2006–07 2. Bundesliga season away to MSV Duisburg.
