= 2013–14 SV Wehen Wiesbaden season =

SV Wehen Wiesbaden
2013–14 season
- Chairman: Markus Hankammer
- Manager: Marc Kienle
- Stadium: BRITA-Arena, Wiesbaden, Germany
- 3. Liga: 4th
- Hesse Cup: Semi-final
- Highest home attendance: 4790 vs. MSV Duisburg, 8 September 2013
- Lowest home attendance: 2763 vs. Stuttgarter Kickers, 27 July 2013

The 2013–14 SV Wehen Wiesbaden season was the 89th season in the club's football history. In 2013–14 the club plays in the 3. Liga, the third tier of German football. It was the club's fifth season in this league, having been relegated from the 2. Bundesliga in 2009.

== Off-season ==
Wehen made 9 signings over the summer period, including Maximilian Ahlschwede from rivals Kickers Offenbach, Julian Grupp from SG Sonnenhof Großaspach, Stephan Gusche from Hansa Rostock, as well as Alex Nandzik from Fortuna Düsseldorf, Tobias Jänicke from Dynamo Dresden, Maik Vetter and Luca Schnellbacher from Eintracht Frankfurt, Marco Königs from Preußen Münster and Sascha Wolfert from 1.FC Kaiserslautern. They also signed former Slovenian U-21 footballer Denis Perger on loan from SC Freiburg.

SVWW also lost Dominik Stroh-Engel, Zlatko Janjic, Sven Schimmel, and Pascal Bieler from the first team over the summer.

== Fixtures ==
=== Pre-season ===
16 June 2013	RSV Dauborn	0–6	SV Wehen Wiesbaden
			Mann (?); Königs (?); Müller (?); Schnellbacher (?); Wolfert (?)	Attendance: 400; Referee: Olaf Schmidt

20 June 2013	1.FC Naurod	1–10	SV Wehen Wiesbaden
	Kilian 55'		Wolfert 4'; Jänicke 13', 82'; Wießmeier 29'; Schnellbacher 30', 31', 43'; Mann 47'; Königs 48'; Zieba 74'	Attendance: 600; Referee: Witzel

22 June 2013	Wormatia Wörms	1–3	SV Wehen Wiesbaden
	Sträßer 18'		Schnellbacher 58'; Book 62', 78'

23 June 2013	SVN Zweibrücken	2–2	SV Wehen Wiesbaden	Bann
	Kupper 7'; Parra 18'		Herzig 64'; Book 86'	Attendance: 250

29 June 2013	VfL Billerbick	1–20	SV Wehen Wiesbaden
	(?)		Christ (?); Jänicke (?); Zieba (?); Mintzel (?); Schnellbacher (?); Vunguidica (?); Mann (?); Grupp (?); Wießmeier (?)

6 July 2013	TuS Koblenz	0–1	SV Wehen Wiesbaden	Koblenz
			Christ 67'	Attendance: 500; Referee: Wingenbach

8 July 2013	FC Eschborn	0–0 (3–2)	SV Wehen Wiesbaden	Mörfelden

8 July 2013	SKV Mörfelden	0–10	SV Wehen Wiesbaden	Mörfelden
			Wolfert 8'; Book 10'; Gusche 17'; Schnellbacher 31', 48', 55'; Königs 35', 70'; Zwilling , 40' (o.g.); Zieba 60'

13 July 2013	SV Wehen Wiesbaden	2–0	SV Waldhof Mannheim 07	Wiesbaden
14:00	Müller 40'; Vunguidica 59'			Stadium: Brita-Arena; Attendance: 1750; Referee: Markus Wingenbach

=== 3. Liga ===
==== League table ====
Pos	Team	Pld	W	D	L	GF	GA	GD	Pts	Promotion, qualification or relegation
2	RB Leipzig (P)	38	24	7	7	65	34	+31	79	Promotion to 2. Bundesliga and qualification for DFB-Pokal
3	Darmstadt 98 (O, P)	38	21	9	8	58	29	+29	72	Qualification to promotion play-offs and DFB-Pokal
4	Wehen Wiesbaden	38	15	11	12	43	44	−1	56	Qualification for DFB-Pokal
5	VfL Osnabrück	38	15	10	13	50	39	+11	55	
6	Preußen Münster	38	13	14	11	55	50	+5	53	

Source: kicker.de
Rules for classification: 1) points; 2) goal difference; 3) number of goals scored.
(O) Play-off winners; (P) Promoted

==== Matches ====
SV Wehen Wiesbaden began the 2013–14 season away to 1.FC Saarbrücken on 20 July.

20 July 2013 1	1.FC Saarbrücken	1–2	SV Wehen Wiesbaden	Saarbrücken
14:00 CET	Rathgeber 42'	Report	Mann 16'; Vunguidica 39'	Stadium: Ludwigsparkstadion; Attendance: 5250; Referee: Christian Fischer

27 July 2013 2	SV Wehen Wiesbaden	4–0	Stuttgarter Kickers	Wiesbaden
14:00 CET	Jänicke 9'; Mintzel 21'; Wiemann 63'; Vunguidica 81'	Report		Stadium: Brita-Arena; Attendance: 2763; Referee: Sven Jablonski

10 August 2013 3	Hallescher FC	1–2	SV Wehen Wiesbaden	Halle an der Saale
14:00 CET	Bertram 48'	Report	Vunguidica 12'; Mann 82'	Stadium: Erdgas Sportpark; Attendance: 8000; Referee: Arne Aarnink

17 August 2013 4	SV Wehen Wiesbaden	1–1	Preußen Münster	Wiesbaden
14:00 CET	Taylor 37'	Report	Mintzel 61'	Stadium: Brita-Arena; Attendance: 3961; Referee: Karl Valentin (Taufkirchen)

24 August 2013 5	Wacker Burghausen	1–3	SV Wehen Wiesbaden	Burghausen
14:00 CET	Holz 28'	Report	Jänicke 35', 64'; Vunguidica 72'	Stadium: Wacker-Arena; Attendance: 2000; Referee: Thorben Siewer (Drolshagen)

31 August 2013 6	SV Wehen Wiesbaden	2–1	RB Leipzig	Wiesbaden
14:00 CET	Book 22'; Vidovic 38'	Report	Schulz 58'	Stadium: Brita-Arena; Attendance: 4122; Referee: Martin Petersen

3 September 2013 7	Rot-Weiß Erfurt	3–0	SV Wehen Wiesbaden	Erfurt
19:00 CET	Öztürk 25'; Engelhardt 41', 85'	Report		Stadium: Steigerwaldstadion; Attendance: 4368; Referee: Thomas Stein (Weibersbrunn)

8 September 2013 8	SV Wehen Wiesbaden	2–0	MSV Duisburg	Wiesbaden
14:00 CET	Jänicke 85'; Nandzik 90+2'	Report		Stadium: Brita-Arena; Attendance: 4790; Referee: Thorsten Schriever (Dorum)

13 September 2013 9	SV Wehen Wiesbaden	1–1	Holstein Kiel	Wiesbaden
19:00 CET	Vunguidica 40'	Report	Danneberg 80'	Stadium: Brita-Arena; Attendance: 3898; Referee: Günter Perl (Pullach)

21 September 2013 10	SV Elversberg	3–0	SV Wehen Wiesbaden	Spiesen-Elversberg
14:00 CET	Cisse 35'; Salem 35'; Luz 70'	Report		Stadium: Waldstadion an der Kaiserlinde; Attendance: 600; Referee: Robert Schroder

28 September 2013 11	SV Wehen Wiesbaden	1–1	VfB Stuttgart II	Wiesbaden
14:00 CET	Wiemann 90+1'	Report	Röcker 72'	Stadium: Brita-Arena; Attendance: 3097; Referee: Alexander Sather (Grimma)

5 October 2013 12	VfL Osnabrück	1–0	SV Wehen Wiesbaden	Osnabrück
14:00 CET	Wegner 64'	Report		Stadium: Osnatel-Arena; Attendance: 6900; Referee: Rene Rohde

19 October 2013 13	SV Wehen Wiesbaden	0–2	SpVgg Unterhaching	Wiesbaden
14:00 CET		Report	Voglsammer 10'; Haberer 18'	Stadium: Brita-Arena; Attendance: 2813; Referee: Florian Steinberg (Korntal)

26 October 2013 14	1. FC Heidenheim	0–0	SV Wehen Wiesbaden	Heidenheim
14:00 CET		Report		Stadium: Voith Arena; Attendance: 8,000; Referee: Christian Dietz

2 November 2013 15	SV Wehen Wiesbaden	1–1	SSV Jahn Regensburg	Wiesbaden
14:00 CET	Jänicke 34'	Summary	Kotzke 14'	Stadium: Brita-Arena; Attendance: 2,613; Referee: Tobias Reichel

9 November 2013 16	Chemnitzer FC	1–2	SV Wehen Wiesbaden	Chemnitz
14:00 CET	Fink 19'	Summary	Wiemann 51' (pen.); Schnellbacher 82'	Stadium: Stadion an der Gellertstraße; Attendance: 4,226; Referee: (Germany) Timo Gerach

23 November 2013 17	SV Wehen Wiesbaden	1–1	Borussia Dortmund II	Wiesbaden
14:00 CET	Röser 72'	Summary	Harder 48'	Stadium: Brita-Arena; Attendance: 2,703; Referee: (Germany) Robert Kampka

30 November 2013 18	SV Darmstadt 98	2–2	SV Wehen Wiesbaden	Darmstadt
14:00 CET	Heller 10'; Baier 59'		Vunguidica 53'; Röser 80'	Stadium: Stadion am Böllenfalltor; Attendance: 4800; Referee: Arno Blos (Deizisau)

7 December 2013 19	SV Wehen Wiesbaden	1–3	Hansa Rostock	Wiesbaden
14:00 CET	Jänicke 66'	Report	Blacha 34'; Plat 54'; Jakobs 56'	Stadium: Brita-Arena; Attendance: 3234; Referee: Thomas Stein (Weibersbrunn)

14 December 2013 20	SV Stuttgarter Kickers	2–0	SV Wehen Wiesbaden	Stuttgart
14:00 CET	Marchese 35'; Soriano 39'	Report		Stadium: Gazi-Stadion auf der Waldau; Attendance: 2670; Referee: Rene Rohde (Rostock)

21 December 2013 21	SV Wehen Wiesbaden	1–0	1.FC Saarbrücken	Wiesbaden
14:00 CET	Wiemann 32'	Report		Stadium: Brita-Arena; Attendance: 3500; Referee: Markus Wingebach

24 January 2014 22	SV Wehen Wiesbaden	0–3	Hallescher FC	Wiesbaden
19:00 CET		Summary	Ziegenbein 45'; Gogia 52'; Sembolo 75'	Stadium: Brita-Arena; Attendance: 2,451; Referee: (Germany) Sascha Stegemann

1 February 2014 23	Preußen Münster	0–1	SV Wehen Wiesbaden	Münster
14:00 CET		Summary	Mann (yellow card) 15'; Jänicke (yellow card) 24'; Mintzel (yellow card) 88'; Müller 90+1'	Stadium: Preußen-Stadion; Attendance: 6,864; Referee: (Germany) Florian Badstübner

8 February 2014 24	SV Wehen Wiesbaden	2–1	Wacker Burghausen	Wiesbaden
14:00 CET	Jänicke 18'; Herzig 57'	Summary	Bopp (yellow card) 55'; Hefele (yellow card) 59'; Benčík 64'; Burkhardt (yellow card) 77'	Stadium: Brita-Arena; Attendance: 1,949; Referee: (Germany) Tobias Reichel

16 February 2014 25	RB Leipzig	1–0	SV Wehen Wiesbaden	Leipzig
14:00 CET	Kaiser 16'; Kimmich (yellow card) 68'; Demme (yellow card) 73'; Sebastian (yellow card) 86'	Summary	Haas (yellow card) 30'; Mann (yellow card) 59'; Grupp (yellow card) 90+1'	Stadium: Red Bull Arena; Attendance: 11,198; Referee: (Germany) Benjamin Brand

22 February 2014 26	SV Wehen Wiesbaden	1–1	Rot-Weiß Erfurt	Wiesbaden
14:00 CET	Mintzel 27'; Ahlschwede (yellow card) 30'; Book (yellow card) 62'	Summary	Kammlott 5' (yellow card) 52'; Odak (yellow card) 54'; Kleineheismann (yellow card) 61'	Stadium: Brita-Arena; Attendance: 2,597; Referee: (Germany) Martin Thomsen

1 March 2014 27	MSV Duisburg	0–0	SV Wehen Wiesbaden	Duisburg
14:00 CET	Leggerwood (yellow card) 57'; Bollmann (yellow card) 60'	Summary	Book (yellow card) 69'; Müller (yellow card) 82'	Stadium: Schauinsland-Reisen-Arena; Attendance: 10,352; Referee: (Germany) Sven Jablonski

8 March 2014 28	Holstein Kiel	3–0	SV Wehen Wiesbaden	Kiel
14:00 CET	Hartmann (yellow card) 31'; Danneberg 50'; Kazior (yellow card) 59'; Schied 79' (yellow card) 82'; Schulze 85'	Summary	Mann (yellow card) 64'; Vunguidica (yellow card) 77'	Stadium: Holstein-Stadion; Attendance: 4,120; Referee: (Germany) Daniel Siebert

15 March 2013 29	SV Wehen Wiesbaden	3–0	SV Elversberg	Wiesbaden
14:00 CET	Book 4'; Mann 53'; Vunguidica 78'	Summary	Wolf (yellow card) 52'	Stadium: Brita-Arena; Attendance: 2,168; Referee: (Germany) Florian Badstübner

21 March 2014 30	VfB Stuttgart II	1–2	SV Wehen Wiesbaden	Stuttgart
19:00 CET	Didavi (yellow card) 26'; Wanitzek 35' (pen.); Grüttner (yellow card) 37'; Funk (yellow card) 90'	Summary	Vunguidica 15'; Mann (yellow card) 64'; Schnellbacher 78'	Stadium: Gazi-Stadion auf der Waldau; Attendance: 510; Referee: (Germany) Karl Valentin

25 March 2014 31	SV Wehen Wiesbaden	1–0	VfL Osnabrück	Wiesbaden
19:00 CET	Vunguidica 16'	Summary	Zenga (yellow card) 21'; Dercho (yellow card) 47'	Stadium: Brita-Arena; Attendance: 2,180; Referee: (Germany) Alexander Sather

29 March 2014 32	SpVgg Unterhaching	1–1	SV Wehen Wiesbaden	Unterhaching
14:00 CET	Moll (yellow card) 20'; Erb (yellow card) 58'; Sternisko 79'	Summary	Vunguidica 32'; Mann (yellow card) 40'; Schnellbacher (yellow card) 90+1'	Stadium: Generali Sportpark; Attendance: 2,450; Referee: (Germany) Thorben Siewer

5 April 2014 33	SV Wehen Wiesbaden	0–1	1. FC Heidenheim	Wiesbaden
14:00 CET	Herzig (yellow card) 50'; Mintzel (yellow card) 67'	Summary	Bagceci (yellow card) 23'; Wittek (yellow card) 29'; Morabit 45'	Stadium: Brita-Arena; Attendance: 2,600; Referee: (Germany) Marcel Unger

12 April 2014 34	SSV Jahn Regensburg	3–0	SV Wehen Wiesbaden	Regensburg
14:00 CET	Muhović 21'; Neunaber (yellow card) 31' (yellow-red card) (goal) 73' (pen.); Aosman (yellow card) 56'; Smarzoch (yellow card) 64'; Amachaibou 81'; Trettenbach (yellow card) 90'	Summary	Mann (yellow card) 43'; Müller (yellow card) 64'; Wiemann (yellow card) 86'	Stadium: Jahnstadion; Attendance: 2,686; Referee: (Germany) Markus Wingenbach

19 April 2014 35	SV Wehen Wiesbaden	1–0	Chemnitzer FC	Wiesbaden
14:00	Jänicke 9'; Haas (yellow card) 78'	Summary	Wachsmuth (yellow card) 28'; Fink (yellow card) 66'	Stadium: Brita-Arena; Attendance: 2,565; Referee: (Germany) Stefan Glasmacher

25 April 2014 36	Borussia Dortmund II	1–4	SV Wehen Wiesbaden	Dortmund
19:00 CET	Meißner (yellow card) 32'; Sarr 39'	Summary	Müller (yellow card) 38'; Jänicke 50'; Herzig 61'; Schnellbacher 72', 80'	Stadium: Stadion Rote Erde; Attendance: 3,209; Referee: (Germany) Robert Schröder

3 May 2014 37	SV Wehen Wiesbaden	0–1	SV Darmstadt 98	Wiesbaden
13:30 CET	Wiemann (yellow card) 78'; Zieba (yellow card) 81'	Summary	Elton da Costa 65'; Sulu (yellow card) 76'; Gondorf (yellow card) 82'	Stadium: Brita-Arena; Attendance: 8,562; Referee: (Germany) Peter Gagelmann

10 May 2014 38	Hansa Rostock	1–1	SV Wehen Wiesbaden	Rostock
13:30 CET	Ruprecht (yellow card) 44'; Kučuković 72'	Summary	Jänicke 1'; Mann (yellow card) 37'; Haas (yellow card) 61'; Ahlschwede (yellow card) 76'	Stadium: DKB-Arena; Attendance: 8,100; Referee: (Germany) Karl Valentin

=== Hesse Cup ===
Wehen entered the 69th edition of the Hesse Cup in the Round of 16, with the winners qualifying for the 2014–15 DFB Pokal.

17 September 2013 Round of 16	TuS Dietkirchen	0–1	SV Wehen Wiesbaden	Dietkirchen
19:00 CET		[]	Zieba 63'	Attendance: 1100

16 November 2013 Quarter Final	SF BG Marburg	2–6	SV Wehen Wiesbaden	Marburg
14:00	Koch 65'; Schoch 70'	Report	Christ 9'; Röser 14', 29'; Zieba 47', 88'; Wießmeier

8 April 2014 Semi Final	Kickers Offenbach	1–0	SV Wehen Wiesbaden	Offenbach am Main
19:00		Summary		Stadium: Sparda-Bank-Hessen-Stadion

== Squad ==
=== Squad information ===
Squad Season 2013–14
No.	Player	Nat.	Birthdate	at SWW since	previous club
Goalkeepers
1	Michael Gurski	(Germany)	21 Mar 1979	2010	SV Sandhausen
21	Raphael Laux	(Germany)	22 Apr 1991	2010	---
25	Markus Kolke	(Germany)	18 Aug 1990	2011	SV Waldhof Mannheim
Defenders
2	Nico Herzig	(Germany)	10 Dec 1983	2011	Alemannia Aachen
3	Stephan Gusche	(Germany)	13 Feb 1990	2013	Hansa Rostock
4	Robert Müller	(Germany)	12 Nov 1986	2012	Hansa Rostock
8	Marcus Mann (footballer)	(Germany)	14 March 1984	2011	1.FC Saarbrücken
13	Denis Perger	(Slovenia)	10 June 1993	2013	SC Freiburg (loan)
15	Adam Straith	(Canada)	11 Sep 1990	2013	Energie Cottbus
16	Daniel Döringer	(Germany)	26 Feb 1991	2011	---
19	Jeff Gyasi	(Germany)	4 Jan 1989	2012	Rot-Weiß Oberhausen
22	Max Ahlschwede	(Germany)	15 Oct 1990	2013	Kickers Offenbach
26	Michael Wiemann	(Germany)	9 February 1987	2012	Hansa Rostock
27	Alexander Nandzik	(Germany)	12 Sep 1987	2013	Fortuna Düsseldorf II
30	Jovan Vidovic	(Slovenia)	6 Jan 1989	2013	NK Maribor
Midfielders
5	Julian Grupp	(Germany)	29 Jul 1991	2013	SG Sonnenhof Großaspach
6	Maik Vetter	(Germany)	6 Sep 1991	2013	Eintracht Frankfurt II
7	Marco Christ	(Germany)	6 Nov 1980	2011	Fortuna Düsseldorf
10	Tobias Jänicke	(Germany)	16 Mar 1989	2013	Dynamo Dresden
11	Maciej Zieba	(Poland)	24 Jan 1987	2010	Wuppertaler SV Borussia
17	Martin Röser	(Germany)	13 Aug 1990	2013	Wormatia Worms
23	Alf Mintzel	(Germany)	21 Dec 1981	2010	SV Sandhausen
28	Nils-Ole Book	(Germany)	17 Dec 1986	2011	Rot Weiss Ahlen
31	Julian Wießmeier	(Germany)	4 Nov 1992	2013	1. FC Nürnberg (loan)
Forwards
9	Marco Königs	(Germany)	25 Jan 1990	2013	Preußen Münster
14	Sascha Wolfert	(Germany)	26 Feb 1990	2013	1. FC Kaiserslautern
20	Jose Pierre Vunguidica	(Angola)	3 Jan 1990	2012	1. FC Köln
24	Luca Schnellbacher	(Germany)	6 Mar 1994	2013	Eintracht Frankfurt II
Last updated: 29 July 2013

=== Season Statistics ===
As of 29 July 2013

No.	Pos	Nat	Player	Total		3. Liga		Hesse Cup	
No.	Pos	Nat	Player	Apps	Goals	Apps	Goals	Apps	Goals
Goalkeepers
1	GK	(Germany) GER	Michael Gurski	13	0	13	0	0	0
21	GK	(Germany) GER	Raphael Laux	0	0	0	0	0	0
22	GK	(Germany) GER	Markus Kolke	10	0	8	0	2	0
Defenders
2	DF	(Germany) GER	Nico Herzig	18	0	18	0	0	0
3	DF	(Germany) GER	Stephan Gusche	2	0	2	0	0	0
4	DF	(Germany) GER	Robert Müller	22	0	20	0	2	0
8	DF	(Germany) GER	Marcus Mann (footballer)	12	2	12	2	0	0
13	DF	(Slovenia) SLO	Denis Perger	14	0	13	0	1	0
15	DF	(Canada) CAN	Adam Straith	8	0	7	0	1	0
16	DF	(Germany) GER	Daniel Döringer	0	0	0	0	0	0
18	DF	(Germany) GER	Jeff Gyasi	1	0	0	0	1	0
22	DF	(Germany) GER	Max Ahlschwede	15	0	13	0	2	0
26	DF	(Germany) GER	Michael Wiemann	21	4	19	4	2	0
27	DF	(Germany) GER	Alexander Nandzik	12	1	11	1	1	0
30	DF	(Slovenia) SLO	Jovan Vidovic	12	1	10	1	2	0
Midfielders
5	MF	(Germany) GER	Julian Grupp	12	0	12	0	0	0
6	MF	(Germany) GER	Maik Vetter	0	0	0	0	0	0
7	MF	(Germany) GER	Marco Christ	5	1	4	0	1	1
10	MF	(Germany) GER	Tobias Jänicke	20	6	20	6	0	0
11	MF	(Poland) POL	Maciej Zieba	7	3	5	0	2	3
17	MF	(Germany) GER	Martin Röser	13	4	11	2	2	2
23	MF	(Germany) GER	Alf Mintzel	19	2	19	2	0	0
28	MF	(Germany) GER	Nils-Ole Book	18	1	17	1	1	0
31	MF	(Germany) GER	Julian Wießmeier	5	1	3	0	2	1
Forwards
9	FW	(Germany) GER	Marco Königs	14	0	12	0	2	0
14	FW	(Germany) GER	Sascha Wolfert	8	0	6	0	2	0
20	FW	(Angola) ANG	Jose Pierre Vunguidica	19	6	19	6	0	0
24	FW	(Germany) GER	Luca Schnellbacher	12	1	10	1	2	0

==== Results summary ====
Overall								Home						Away					
Pld	W	D	L	GF	GA	GD	Pts	W	D	L	GF	GA	GD	W	D	L	GF	GA	GD
38	15	11	12	43	44	−1	56	8	6	5	23	18	+5	7	5	7	20	26	−6

Last updated: 10 May 2014.

==== Points breakdown ====
Points at home: 17
Points away from home: 14

Points against promoted teams: 4
Points against relegated teams: 4

6 points: 1.FC Saarbrücken
4 points:
3 points: SV Stuttgarter Kickers, Hallescher FC, Wacker Burghausen, RB Leipzig, MSV Duisburg, Chemnitzer FC
2 points:
1 point: SC Preußen Münster, Holstein Kiel, VfB Stuttgart II, 1.FC Heidenheim, SSV Jahn Regensburg, Borussia Dortmund II, SV Darmstadt 98
0 points: Rot-Weiß Erfurt, SV Elversburg, VfL Osnabrück, SpVgg Unterhaching, Hansa Rostock

==== Biggest & smallest ====
Biggest home win: 4–0 vs. SV Stuttgarter Kickers, 27 July 2013
Biggest home defeat: 0–2 vs. SpVgg Unterhaching, 19 October 2013 – 1–3 vs. Hansa Rostock, 7 December 2013
Biggest away win: 1–3 vs. Wacker Burghausen, 24 August 2013
Biggest away defeat: 3–0 vs. Rot-Weiß Erfurt, 3 September 2013 – SV Elversburg, 21 September 2013

Biggest home attendance: 4790 vs. MSV Duisburg, 8 September 2013
Smallest home attendance: 2613 vs. SSV Jahn Regensburg, 2 November 2013
Biggest away attendance: 8000 vs. Hallescher FC, 10 August 2013 – 1. FC Heidenheim, 26 October 2013
Smallest away attendance: 600 vs. SV Elversburg, 21 September 2013

==== Results by match ====
Round	1	2	3	4	5	6	7	8	9	10	11	12	13	14	15	16	17	18	19	20	21	22	23	24	25	26	27	28	29	30	31	32	33	34
Ground	A	H	A	H	A	H	A	H	H	A	H	A	H	A	H	A	H	A	H	H	A	H	A	H	A	A	H	A	H	A	H	A	H	A
Result	W	W	W	D	W	W	L	W	D	L	D	L	L	D	D	W	D	D	L	L	W	L	W	W	L	D								
Position	3	1	1	2	1	1	2	2	2	2	2	5	7	7	7	5	5	4	7	7	7	7	6	6	6	6								

Updated to match(es) played on 22 February 2014. Source:
A = Away; H = Home; W = Win; D = Draw; L = Loss

== Goal Scorers ==
All competitions

Scorer	Goals
(Germany) Tobias Jänicke	6
(Angola) Jose Pierre Vunguidica	5
(Germany) Martin Röser	4
(Germany) Michael Wiemann	4
(Poland) Maciej Zieba	3
(Germany) Marcus Mann (footballer)	2
(Germany) Alf Mintzel	2
(Germany) Julian Wießmeier	1
(Germany) Marco Christ	1
(Germany) Luca Schnellbacher	1
(Slovenia) Jovan Vidovic	1
(Germany) Alexander Nandzik	1
(Germany) Nils-Ole Book	1

2013–14 3. Liga

Scorer	Goals
(Germany) Tobias Jänicke	6
(Angola) Jose Pierre Vunguidica	5
(Germany) Michael Wiemann	4
(Germany) Martin Röser	2
(Germany) Marcus Mann (footballer)	2
(Germany) Alf Mintzel	2
(Germany) Luca Schnellbacher	1
(Slovenia) Jovan Vidovic	1
(Germany) Alexander Nandzik	1
(Germany) Nils-Ole Book	1

2013–14 Hesse Cup

Scorer	Goals
(Poland) Maciej Zieba	3
(Germany) Martin Röser	2
(Germany) Marco Christ	1
(Germany) Julian Wießmeier	1

Last updated: 21 December 2013
