= 2011–12 Eintracht Frankfurt season =

Eintracht Frankfurt
2011–12 season
- Chairman: Heribert Bruchhagen
- Manager: Armin Veh
- 2. Bundesliga: 2nd
- DFB-Pokal: 2nd round
- Top goalscorer: League: Alexander Meier (17); All: Alexander Meier (17)
- Highest home attendance: 50,800 29 April 2012 v TSV 1860 München (league)
- Lowest home attendance: 16,500 25 July 2011 v St. Pauli (league) (limited capacity due to a league judgement)
- Average home league attendance: 38,118 (league)
Home colours	Away colours	Third colours

The 2011–12 season was Eintracht Frankfurt's 112th season and their 1st season in the 2. Bundesliga after being relegated from the Bundesliga for the 4th time.

The 2011–12 season saw Eintracht play local rival FSV Frankfurt in a league match for the first time in almost 50 years. The last league game between the two had been played on 27 January 1962, then in the Oberliga Süd. For the first of the two matches, FSV's home game on 21 August 2011, the decision was made to move to Eintracht's stadium as FSV's Volksbankstadion only holds less than 11,000 spectators and in excess of 40,000 spectators were expected for the game. The game, held in front of over 50,000 spectators, ended in a 4–0 victory for Eintracht.

== Transfers ==
=== Summer transfers in ===
- Marcos Alvarez from FC Bayern Munich II
- Bamba Anderson loaned from Borussia Mönchengladbach
- Stefan Bell loaned from Mainz 05, was previously loaned to TSV 1860 München
- Habib Bellaïd loan return from CS Sedan
- Constant Djakpa from Bayer Leverkusen, was previously loaned to Hannover 96
- Julian Dudda from Eintracht Frankfurt U19
- Rob Friend from Hertha BSC
- Erwin Hoffer from loaned from Napoli, was previously loaned to 1. FC Kaiserslautern
- Mohammadou Idrissou from Borussia Mönchengladbach
- Thomas Kessler loaned from 1. FC Köln, was previously loaned to FC St. Pauli
- Ümit Korkmaz loan return from VfL Bochum
- Matthias Lehmann from FC St. Pauli
- Karim Matmour from Borussia Mönchengladbach
- Nikola Petković loan return from Al-Ahli
- Gordon Schildenfeld from SK Sturm Graz

=== Summer transfers out ===
- Halil Altıntop to Trabzonspor
- Ioannis Amanatidis to unknown
- Zlatan Bajramović retired
- Chris to VfL Wolfsburg
- Ralf Fährmann to FC Schalke 04
- Martin Fenin to Energie Cottbus
- Maik Franz to Hertha BSC
- Marcel Heller to Dynamo Dresden
- Kevin Kraus to SpVgg Greuther Fürth
- Andreas Rössl to FC Ismaning
- Marco Russ to VfL Wolfsburg
- Patrick Ochs to VfL Wolfsburg
- Nikola Petković to Red Star Belgrade
- Aleksandar Vasoski to AO Kavala

=== Winter transfers in ===
- Mohammed Abu loaned from Manchester City, was previously loaned to Strømsgodset IF
- Martin Amedick from 1. FC Kaiserslautern
- Heiko Butscher from SC Freiburg

=== Winter transfers out ===
- Mohammed Abu loan return to Manchester City and passed on to Strømsgodset IF
- Stefan Bell loan return to Mainz 05
- Ricardo Clark loaned to Stabæk IF
- Theofanis Gekas to Samsunspor
- Georgios Tzavelas to AS Monaco

== Results ==
Pre-season matches

19 June 2011 Friendly	Senica	1–2	Eintracht Frankfurt	Sportplatz, St. Ulrich, Austria
18:30 CET	Smetana 44'	Report	Fenin 52'; Rode 90'	Attendance: 500

22 June 2011 Friendly	Košice	1–5	Eintracht Frankfurt	Sportzentrum Aug, Seekirchen, Austria
18:30 CET	Karaš 79'	Report	Hoffer 6'; Meier 44'; Caio 59'; Fenin 71' (pen.); Djakpa 78'	Attendance: 150

29 June 2011 Friendly	1. FC Eschborn	1–5	Eintracht Frankfurt	Heinrich-Graf-Sportanlage, Eschborn
18:30 CET	Wade 74'	Report	Meier 22'; Caio 39'; Caio 42'; Gekas 60'; Alvarez 62'	Attendance: 3,000

2 July 2011 Friendly	Young Boys	1–3	Eintracht Frankfurt	Liebefeld, Köniz, Switzerland
15:30 CET	Silberbauer 67' (pen.)	Report	Caio 41' (pen.); Meier 72'; Fenin 73'	Attendance: 2,900

8 July 2011 Friendly	Waldhof Mannheim	0–4	Eintracht Frankfurt	Carl-Benz-Stadion, Mannheim
18:30 CET		Report	Meier 21'; Rode 23'; Hoffer 40'; Gekas 86'

League matches

15 July 2011 2. Bundesliga (day 1)	SpVgg Greuther Fürth	2–3	Eintracht Frankfurt	Trolli Arena, Fürth
20:30 CET	Nöthe 20'; Nöthe 44'	Report	Meier 56'; Meier 64'; Matmour 89'	Attendance: 14,200

25 July 2011 2. Bundesliga (day 2)	Eintracht Frankfurt	1–1	FC St. Pauli	Commerzbank-Arena, Frankfurt
20:15 CET	Meier 78'	Report	Bartels 38'	Attendance: 16,500 (limited capacity due to a league judgement)

Domestic Cup

30 July 2011 DFB-Pokal	Hallescher FC	0–2	Eintracht Frankfurt	Stadion im Bildungszentrum, Halle
15:30 CET		Report	Gekas 85' (pen.); Gekas 90'	Attendance: 2,800

League matches

7 August 2011 2. Bundesliga (day 3)	Eintracht Braunschweig	0–3	Eintracht Frankfurt	Eintracht-Stadion, Braunschweig
13:30 CET		Report	Köhler 3'; Meier 83'; Meier 85'	Attendance: 23,400

15 August 2011 2. Bundesliga (day 4)	Eintracht Frankfurt	1–1	Fortuna Düsseldorf	Commerzbank-Arena, Frankfurt
20:15 CET	Jung 3'; Meier (yellow card) 89' (yellow-red card)	Report	Beister 54'	Attendance: 42,000

21 August 2011 2. Bundesliga (day 5)	FSV Frankfurt	0–4	Eintracht Frankfurt	Commerzbank-Arena, Frankfurt
13:30 CET		Report	Rode 17'; Gekas 31' (pen.); Köhler 40'; Köhler 89'	Attendance: 50,250

Test match

24 August 2011 Friendly	SG Huttengrund	0–2	Eintracht Frankfurt	Sportplatz, Bad Soden-Salmünster
18:00 CET		Report	Alvarez; Hoffer; Match abandoned after 10 minutes due to severe weather	Attendance: 2,200

League matches

28 August 2011 2. Bundesliga (day 6)	Eintracht Frankfurt	0–0	SC Paderborn	Commerzbank-Arena, Frankfurt
13:30 CET		Report		Attendance: 34,200

Test match

3 September 2011 Friendly	KSV Baunatal	1–7	Eintracht Frankfurt	Parkstadion, Baunatal
15:00 CET	Frerking 70'	Report	Idrissou 25'; Friend 32'; Idrissou 60'; Gekas 65'; Gekas 77'; Friend 81'; Friend 85'	Attendance: 1,200

League matches

10 September 2011 2. Bundesliga (day 7)	Energie Cottbus	3–3	Eintracht Frankfurt	Stadion der Freundschaft, Cottbus
13:00 CET	Rangelov 10'; Rangelov 50'; Adlung 70'	Report	Friend 66'; Korkmaz 72'; Idrissou 89'	Attendance: 13,520

16 September 2011 2. Bundesliga (day 8)	Eintracht Frankfurt	4–1	Hansa Rostock	Commerzbank-Arena, Frankfurt
18:00 CET	Idrissou 2'; Meier 52'; Idrissou 56'; Djakpa 90'	Report	Jänicke 71'	Attendance: 38,500

Test match

21 September 2011 Friendly	Germania Großkrotzenburg	1–6	Eintracht Frankfurt	Oberwaldstadion, Großkrotzenburg
17:30 CET	Capone 5'	Report	Hoffer 13'; Lehmann 47'; Gekas 61'; Korkmaz 75'; Bell 79'; Gekas 80'	Attendance: 2,000

League matches

26 September 2011 2. Bundesliga (day 9)	Dynamo Dresden	1–4	Eintracht Frankfurt	Glücksgas Stadium, Dresden
20:15 CET	Fiél 31'	Report	Gekas 35'; Gekas 40'; Idrissou 84'; Idrissou 87'	Attendance: 28,976

30 September 2011 2. Bundesliga (day 10)	Eintracht Frankfurt	3–1	Union Berlin	Commerzbank-Arena, Frankfurt
18:00 CET	Gekas 30'; Meier 38'; Hoffer 90'	Report	Quiring 75'	Attendance: 35,100

Test match

7 October 2011 Friendly	SG Huttengrund	0–18	Eintracht Frankfurt	Sportplatz, Bad Soden-Salmünster
17:00 CET		Report	Schwegler 7'; Caio 12'; Friend 15'; Friend 16'; Hoffer 23'; Caio 28'; Hoffer 34'; Köhler 38'; Friend 41'; Belegu 48'; Bellaïd 51'; Hoffer 53'; Ehlert 61'; Caio 62'; Hoffer 74'; Friend 81'; Ehlert 83'; Friend 86'	Attendance: 1,700

League matches

14 October 2011 2. Bundesliga (day 11)	VfL Bochum	0–2	Eintracht Frankfurt	Ruhrstadion, Bochum
18:00 CET		Report	Acquistapace 16' (o.g.); Köhler 36'	Attendance: 20,132

23 October 2011 2. Bundesliga (day 12)	Eintracht Frankfurt	3–0	MSV Duisburg	Commerzbank-Arena, Frankfurt
13:30 CET	Hoffer 35'; Hoffer 53'; Meier 65'	Report		Attendance: 39,900

Domestic Cup

26 October 2011 DFB-Pokal	Eintracht Frankfurt	0–1 (a.e.t.)	1. FC Kaiserslautern	Commerzbank-Arena, Frankfurt
20:30 CET		Report	Sukuta-Pasu 119'	Attendance: 46,000

League matches

30 October 2011 2. Bundesliga (day 13)	FC Ingolstadt	1–1	Eintracht Frankfurt	Audi Sportpark, Ingolstadt
13:30 CET	Leitl 73'	Report	Matmour 90'	Attendance: 9,843

7 November 2011 2. Bundesliga (day 14)	Erzgebirge Aue	1–2	Eintracht Frankfurt	Erzgebirgsstadion, Aue
20:15 CET	König 45'; Lachheb (red card) 74'	Report	Hoffer 40'; Idrissou 86'	Attendance: 8,600

20 November 2011 2. Bundesliga (day 15)	Eintracht Frankfurt	4–3	Alemannia Aachen	Commerzbank-Arena, Frankfurt
13:30 CET	Idrissou 9'; Köhler 12'; Hoffer 81'; Matmour 89'	Report	Auer 78'; Radu 82'; Demai 87'	Attendance: 38,500

26 November 2011 2. Bundesliga (day 16)	1860 Munich	2–1	Eintracht Frankfurt	Allianz Arena, Munich
13:00 CET	Rakić 1'; Volland 67'	Report	Gekas 90'	Attendance: 30,660

3 December 2011 2. Bundesliga (day 17)	Eintracht Frankfurt	2–0	Karlsruher SC	Commerzbank-Arena, Frankfurt
13:00 CET	Gekas 1'; Gekas 66'	Report		Attendance: 37,100

12 December 2011 2. Bundesliga (day 18)	Eintracht Frankfurt	0–0	SpVgg Greuther Fürth	Commerzbank-Arena, Frankfurt
20:15 CET		Report		Attendance: 35,500

19 December 2011 2. Bundesliga (day 19)	FC St. Pauli	2–0	Eintracht Frankfurt	Millerntor-Stadion, Hamburg
20:15 CET	Morena 32'; Kruse 68'	Report		Attendance: 24,487

Indoor soccer tournament

5 January 2011 Indoor soccer (Hessen Cup)	Eintracht Frankfurt	3–3	1899 Hoffenheim	SAP Arena, Mannheim
18:15 CET	Bell; Bell; A Jung	Report		Attendance: 12,000

5 January 2010 Indoor soccer (Hessen Cup)	Eintracht Frankfurt	1–6	VfL Wolfsburg	SAP Arena, Mannheim
20:03 CET	Alvarez	Report		Attendance: 12,000

Indoor soccer tournament

6 January 2012 Indoor soccer (Hessen Cup)	Eintracht Frankfurt	1–2	Alemannia Aachen	Ballsporthalle, Frankfurt
18:39 CET		Report		Attendance: 5,000

6 January 2012 Indoor soccer (Hessen Cup)	Eintracht Frankfurt	3–3	Kickers Offenbach	Ballsporthalle, Frankfurt
19:33 CET		Report		Attendance: 5,000

Test matches

13 January 2012 Friendly	Eintracht Frankfurt	3–0	VfR Aalen	Training pitch at Commerzbank-Arena, Frankfurt
16:00 CET	Meier 7'; Schwegler 82'; Kittel 84'	Report		Attendance: closed session

19 January 2012 Friendly	Qatar under-23	0–1	Eintracht Frankfurt	Transpire Arena, Doha, Qatar
17:45 AST		Report	Hoffer 48'	Attendance: 70

22 January 2012 Friendly	Aspire Intl XI	0–6	Eintracht Frankfurt	?, Doha, Qatar
17:30 AST		Report	Matmour 9'; Jung 13'; Lehmann 16'; Caio 17'; Matmour 43'; Hoffer 59'	Attendance: 27

29 January 2012 Friendly	Eintracht Frankfurt	0–1	Lausanne-Sport	Commerzbank-Arena, Frankfurt
14:00 AST		Report	Prijović 42'	Attendance: 8,000

League matches

5 February 2012 2. Bundesliga (day 20)	Eintracht Frankfurt	2–1	Eintracht Braunschweig	Commerzbank-Arena, Frankfurt
13:30 CET	Meier 11'; Meier 22'		Kruppke 5'	Attendance: 36,200 rep=http://www.eintracht.de/english/news/36891/

13 February 2012 2. Bundesliga (day 21)	Fortuna Düsseldorf	1–1	Eintracht Frankfurt	Esprit Arena, Düsseldorf
20:15 CET	Langeneke 90' (pen.); Rösler (yellow card) 90' (yellow-red card)	Report	Köhler 69'	Attendance: 41,213

18 February 2012 2. Bundesliga (day 22)	Eintracht Frankfurt	6–1	FSV Frankfurt	Commerzbank-Arena, Frankfurt
13:00 CET	Matmour 14'; Matmour 33'; Meier 61'; Kittel 67'; Hoffer 70'; Matmour 79'	Report	Mitsanski 68'	Attendance: 40,700

26 February 2012 2. Bundesliga (day 23)	SC Paderborn	4–2	Eintracht Frankfurt	Energieteam Arena, Paderborn
13:30 CET	Proschwitz 6'; Kara 18'; Rupp 58'; Wemmer 64'	Report	Köhler 26'; Meier 42'	Attendance: 15,000

4 March 2012 2. Bundesliga (day 24)	Eintracht Frankfurt	1–0	Energie Cottbus	Commerzbank-Arena, Frankfurt
13:30 CET	Hoffer 69'	Report		Attendance: 33,900

Test matches

7 March 2012 Friendly	Eintracht Frankfurt	6–0	Rot-Weiss Frankfurt	Training pitch at Commerzbank-Arena, Frankfurt
15:30 CET	Schwegler 2'; Idrissou 13'; Butscher 33'; Idrissou 44'; Korkmaz 77'; Friend 83'	Report		Attendance: 300

League matches

11 March 2012 2. Bundesliga (day 25)	Hansa Rostock	1–5	Eintracht Frankfurt	DKB-Arena, Rostock
13:30 CET	R. Müller 63'	Report	Köhler 13'; Schildenfeld 42'; Kittel 77'; Rode 84'; Idrissou 87'	Attendance: 13,300

16 March 2012 2. Bundesliga (day 26)	Eintracht Frankfurt	3–0	Dynamo Dresden	Commerzbank-Arena, Frankfurt
18:00 CET	Meier 3'; Schuppan 14' (og.); Idrissou 34'	Report		Attendance: 37,100 (Away supporters officially banned)

Test matches

21 March 2012 Friendly	TSG Neu-Isenburg	1–6	Eintracht Frankfurt	Sportpark Neu-Isenburg, Neu-Isenburg
18:30 CET	Peters 69' (pen.)	Report	Friend 12'; Hoffer 48'; Caio 51' (pen.); Matmour 65'; Bellaïd 74'; Hoffer 80'	Attendance: 1,000

League matches

26 March 2012 2. Bundesliga (day 27)	Union Berlin	0–4	Eintracht Frankfurt	Stadion An der Alten Försterei, Berlin
20:15 CET		Report	Idrissou 9'; Hoffer 57'; Meier 73'; Meier 89'	Attendance: 16,589 (Away supporters officially banned)

30 March 2012 2. Bundesliga (day 28)	Eintracht Frankfurt	3–0	VfL Bochum	Commerzbank-Arena, Frankfurt
18:00 CET	Idrissou 18'; Meier 32'; Hoffer 35'	Report		Attendance: 39,300

Test matches

3 April 2012 Friendly	FC Bierstadt	0–11	Eintracht Frankfurt	Helmut-Schön-Sportpark, Wiesbaden
18:00 CET		Report	Schaaf 2'; Pokar 4'; Lehmann 7' (pen.); Caio 16'; Caio 21'; Kittel 27' (pen.); Friend 31'; Lehmann 41'; Soriano 65'; Nazarov 71'; Soriano 89'	Attendance: 2,500

League matches

7 April 2012 2. Bundesliga (day 29)	MSV Duisburg	2–0	Eintracht Frankfurt	Schauinsland-Reisen-Arena, Duisburg
13:00 CET	Šukalo 44'; Bruno Soares 52'	Report		Attendance: 19,027

11 April 2012 2. Bundesliga (day 30)	Eintracht Frankfurt	1–1	FC Ingolstadt	Commerzbank-Arena, Frankfurt
17:30 CET	Idrissou 49'	Report	Akaïchi 71'	Attendance: 38,000

14 April 2012 2. Bundesliga (day 31)	Eintracht Frankfurt	4–0	Erzgebirge Aue	Commerzbank-Arena, Frankfurt
13:00 CET	Meier 28'; Kittel 44'; Jung 54'; Köhler 83'	Report		Attendance: 46,600

Test matches

17 April 2012 Friendly	Kelsterbach XI	0–8	Eintracht Frankfurt	Sportpark Kelsterbach, Kelsterbach
17:30 CET		Report	Korkmaz 10'; Friend 28'; Caio 43'; Amin 48'; Friend 65'; Wolfert 73'; Nazarov 75'; Friend 78'	Attendance: 1,000

League matches

23 April 2012 2. Bundesliga (day 32)	Alemannia Aachen	0–3	Eintracht Frankfurt	Tivoli, Aachen
20:15 CET		Report	Idrissou 45'; Idrissou 47'; Olajengbesi 73'	Attendance: 27,942

29 April 2012 2. Bundesliga (day 33)	Eintracht Frankfurt	0–2	1860 Munich	Commerzbank-Arena, Frankfurt
13:30 CET	Djakpa (red card) 65'	Report	S Jung 17' (o.g.); Vallori 21'	Attendance: 50,800

6 May 2012 2. Bundesliga (day 34)	Karlsruher SC	1–0	Eintracht Frankfurt	Wildparkstadion, Karlsruhe
13:30 CET	Charalambous 9'	Report		Attendance: 26,780

Test matches

8 May 2012 Friendly	Eintracht Wetzlar	0–7	Eintracht Frankfurt	Stadion Wetzlar, Wetzlar
18:30 CET			Butscher 8'; Idrissou 39'; Caio 42'; Idrissou 49'; Friend 55'; Caio 73'; Köhler 84'	Attendance: 1,500

9 May 2012 Friendly	SpVgg Hainstadt	0–13	Eintracht Frankfurt	Sportzentrum Am Katzenfeld, Hainburg
18:00 CET			Wolfert 12'; Caio 17'; Köhler 34'; Anderson Bamba 45'; Streker 50'; Friend 51'; Wolfert 67'; Matmour 68'; Friend 69'; Friend 73'; Friend 83'; Pokar 88'; Wolfert 90'	Attendance: 1,000

10 May 2012 Friendly	TSV Holzhausen	2–17	Eintracht Frankfurt	Bernhardt-Vocke-Sportzentrum, Immenhausen
18:00 CET	Mergard 45'; Kumpe 78'		Friend 3'; Wolfert 17'; Friend 20'; Caio 21'; Caio 27'; Caio 30'; Pokar 37'; Wolfert 43'; Amedick 47'; Wolfert 49'; Caio 59'; Caio 61'; Meier 63'; Wolfert 80'; Wolfert 88'; Djakpa 90'; Kühn 91'	Attendance: 2,000

Notes: * Fixture date not yet fixed

== Sources ==
- Official English Eintracht website
- Eintracht-Archiv.de
- Eintracht Frankfurt on the kicker sports magazine
