= 2017–18 SV Wehen Wiesbaden season =

Wehen Wiesbaden
2017–18 season
- Chairman: Markus Hankammer
- Manager: Rüdiger Rehm
- Stadium: Brita-Arena
- 3. Liga: 4th
- DFB-Pokal: Second round
- Hessian Cup: Semi-finals
- All statistics correct as of 28 January 2018.

The 2017–18 SV Wehen Wiesbaden season is the 92nd season in the SV Wehen Wiesbaden football club's history. The season covers a period from 1 July 2017 to 30 June 2018.

== Players ==
=== Squad information ===
As of 4 February 2018

Note: Flags indicate national team as defined under FIFA eligibility rules; some limited exceptions apply. Players may hold more than one non-FIFA nationality.

No.	Pos.	Nation	Player
1	GK	(Germany) GER	Markus Kolke
4	DF	(Germany) GER	Sascha Mockenhaupt
5	DF	(Germany) GER	Sören Reddemann
6	DF	(Germany) GER	Patrick Funk
7	MF	(Germany) GER	Philipp Müller
8	MF	(Poland) POL	David Blacha
9	FW	(Germany) GER	Manuel Schäffler
10	MF	(Germany) GER	Robert Andrich
11	FW	(Germany) GER	Agyemang Diawusie (on loan from RB Leipzig)
14	FW	(Germany) GER	Jules Schwadorf
16	DF	(Germany) GER	Niklas Dams
17	MF	(Germany) GER	Kevin Pezzoni
18	DF	(Germany) GER	Steven Ruprecht
19	GK	(Germany) GER	Jan Albrecht

No.	Pos.	Nation	Player
20	MF	(Germany) GER	Moritz Kuhn
22	DF	(Ghana) GHA	Michael Akoto
23	DF	(Germany) GER	Alf Mintzel
24	DF	(Germany) GER	Jeremias Lorch
25	GK	(Germany) GER	Lukas Watkowiak
26	FW	(Germany) GER	Patrick Breitkreuz
27	FW	(Germany) GER	Simon Brandstetter
28	FW	(Germany) GER	Maximilian Dittgen (on loan from 1. FC Kaiserslautern)
29	DF	(Germany) GER	Dominik Nothnagel
30	FW	(Croatia) CRO	Dominik Martinović
33	DF	(Poland) POL	Sebastian Mrowca
36	FW	(Democratic Republic of the Congo) COD	Stephané Mvibudulu
37	MF	(Switzerland) SUI	Stephan Andrist
39	MF	(Ghana) GHA	Evans Nyarko

== Competitions ==
Win Draw Loss

=== 3. Liga ===
==== League table ====
Pos	Team	Pld	W	D	L	GF	GA	GD	Pts	Promotion, qualification or relegation
2	SC Paderborn (P)	38	25	8	5	90	33	+57	83	Promotion to 2. Bundesliga and qualification for DFB-Pokal
3	Karlsruher SC	38	19	12	7	49	29	+20	69	Qualification for promotion play-offs and DFB-Pokal
4	Wehen Wiesbaden	38	21	5	12	76	39	+37	68	Qualification for DFB-Pokal
5	Würzburger Kickers	38	17	10	11	53	46	+7	61	
6	Hansa Rostock	38	16	12	10	48	34	+14	60	

Source: DFB
Rules for classification: 1) Points; 2) Goal difference; 3) Goals scored
(P) Promoted

==== Results summary ====
Overall								Home						Away					
Pld	W	D	L	GF	GA	GD	Pts	W	D	L	GF	GA	GD	W	D	L	GF	GA	GD
22	13	3	6	46	18	+28	42	7	1	2	25	8	+17	6	2	4	21	10	+11

Last updated: 27 January 2018.
Source: kicker

==== Results by round ====
Game Week	1	2	3	4	5	6	7	8	9	10	11	12	13	14	15	16	17	18	19	20	21	22	23	24	25	26	27	28	29	30	31	32	33	34	35	36	37	38
Ground																																						
Result																																						
Position																																						

A = Away; H = Home; W = Win; D = Draw; L = Loss; P = Postponed

==== Matches ====
1	SV Wehen Wiesbaden	1-0	FC Carl Zeiss Jena	Wiesbaden
2.05	Sören Reddemann			Stadium: Brita Arena

2	VfL Osnabrück	v	Stadion an der Bremer Brücke
	Manuel Schäffler; Steven Ruprecht; Patrick Funk; Stephan Andrist

3	SV Wehen Wiesbaden	v	SpVgg Unterhaching	Wiesbaden
	David Blacha

4	Karlsruher SC	v	SV Wehen Wiesbaden
	Anton Fink; Kai Bülow		Florian Heft	Referee: Florian Heft

5	SV Wehen Wiesbaden	1-1	SC Fortuna Köln	Wiesbaden
	Steven Ruprecht		Daniel Keita-Ruel	Stadium: Brita-Arena

6	Hallescher FC	2-1	SV Wehen Wiesbaden	Leuna-Chemie-Stadion
	Martin Röser; Petar Sliskovic		Manuel Schäffler,	Referee: Sören Storks

7	Hallescher FC	2-1		Halle
	Martin Röse; Petar Sliskovic		Manuel Schäffler	Stadium: Leuna-Chemie-Stadion; Referee: Sören Storks

8	SV Wehen Wiesbaden	2-1	Chemnitzer FC
	Philipp Müller; Manuel Schäffler,		Björn Kluft	Referee: Michael Bacher

9	v

10	SV Wehen Wiesbaden	v	SG Sonnenhof Großaspach
	David Blacha; Stephan Andrist Philipp Müller; Manuel Schäffler

=== DFB-Pokal ===
13 August 2017 First round	Wehen Wiesbaden	2–0	Erzgebirge Aue	Wiesbaden
18:30	Blacha 4'; Andrist 7'	Report		Stadium: Brita-Arena; Attendance: 2,500; Referee: Frank Willenborg

24 October 2017 Second round	Wehen Wiesbaden	1–3	Schalke 04	Wiesbaden
18:30	Blacha 76'	Report	Di Santo 26'; Burgstaller 30'; Mintzel 53' (o.g.)	Stadium: Brita-Arena; Attendance: 11,373; Referee: Sven Jablonski

=== Hessian Cup ===
Bayern Alzenau	v	SV Wehen Wiesbaden	Städtisches Stadion am Prischoß
		Robert Andrich	Attendance: 200; Referee: horsten Eick

FSV Frankfurt	v	SV Wehen Wiesbaden	Frankfurt
		Robert Andrich	Stadium: Stadion am Bornheimer Hang; Attendance: 895; Referee: Julius Martenstein

TSV Steinbach Haiger	2-0	SV Wehen Wiesbaden	Haiger
Michael Akoto; Dennis Wegner			Stadium: SIBRE-Sportzentrum Haarwasen; Attendance: 1,589; Referee: Nicklas Rau
