= 2012–13 FC Hansa Rostock season =

Hansa Rostock
2012–13 season
- Stadium: DKB-Arena, Rostock, Mecklenburg-Western Pomerania
- 3. Liga: 6th
- DFB-Pokal: First round
- Mecklenburg-Vorpommern Cup: Third round

The 2012–13 FC Hansa Rostock season is the 67th season in the club's football history. In 2012–13 the club plays in the 3. Liga; the third tier of German football. It is the club's first season in this league after relegation from the 2. Bundesliga in 2012. The club was eliminated in the first round of the DFB-Pokal and are currently in the Mecklenburg-Vorpommern Cup.

== Review and events ==
The 2012–13 FC Hansa Rostock season began on 21 July 2012 with a 2–1 victory against Stuttgarter Kickers. The club also took part in the DFB-Pokal of the DFB-Pokal, and was knocked out in the first round by 1. FC Kaiserslautern. The club also takes part in the 2012–13 edition of the Mecklenburg-Vorpommern Cup, having reached the third round.

After an average start to the season, with nine points out of eight matches and a 14th place in the table the club dismissed coach Wolfgang Wolf on 3 September and replaced him with Marc Fascher two days later.

== Fixtures and results ==
=== Legend ===
Win Draw Loss Postponed

=== 3. Liga ===
==== League results and fixtures ====
| Match | Date | Time | Stadium | City | Opponent | Result | Attendance | Goalscorers | | Source |
| Match | Date | Time | Stadium | City | Opponent | Result | Attendance | Hansa Rostock | Opponent | Source |
|---|---|---|---|---|---|---|---|---|---|---|
| 1 | 21 July 2012 | 14:00 | DKB-Arena | Rostock | Stuttgarter Kickers | 2–1 | 13,700 | Berger 33'; Plat 85' | Grüttner 20' | |
| 2 | 28 July 2012 | 14:00 | Generali Sportpark | Unterhaching | SpVgg Unterhaching | 0–3 | 3,500 | — | Thee 36'; Rohracker 78'; Voglsammer 88' | |
| 3 | 4 August 2012 | 14:00 | DKB-Arena | Rostock | Babelsberg 03 | 4–1 | 10,200 | Plat 12'; Smetana 17'; Weilandt 80'; Leemans 84' | Kreuels 45' (pen.) | |
| 4 | 8 August 2012 | 19:00 | Preußenstadion | Münster | Preußen Münster | 2–5 | 10,748 | Plat 5'; Jordanov 18' | Heise 19'; Kühne 28' (pen.), 52' (pen.); Schmidt 57'; Taylor 83' | |
| 5 | 12 August 2012 | 14:00 | DKB-Arena | Rostock | Chemnitzer FC | 0–0 | 11,800 | — | — | |
| 6 | 26 August 2012 | 14:00 | Stadion am Böllenfalltor | Darmstadt | Darmstadt 98 | 1–1 | 8,600 | Quaschner 67' | Tatara 22' | |
| 7 | 29 August 2012 | 19:00 | Wacker-Arena | Burghausen | Wacker Burghausen | 0–2 | 2,850 | — | Schwarz 41'; Schmidt 81' | |
| 8 | 1 September 2012 | 14:00 | DKB-Arena | Rostock | Wehen Wiesbaden | 1–1 | 6,300 | Plat 70' | Janjić 37' (pen.) | |
| 9 | 16 September 2012 | 14:00 | Voith-Arena | Heidenheim | 1. FC Heidenheim | 2–1 | 9,000 | Weilandt 18'; Smetana 63' | Thurk 50' | |
| 10 | 22 September 2012 | 14:30 | DKB-Arena | Rostock | Hallescher FC | 2–0 | 12,200 | Smetana 10', 32' | — | |
| 11 | 25 September 2012 | 19:00 | Gazi-Stadion auf der Waldau | Stuttgart | VfB Stuttgart II | 2–0 | 1,065 | Smetana 11'; Plat 80' | — | |
| 12 | 29 September 2012 | 13:30 | DKB-Arena | Rostock | VfL Osnabrück | 0–3 | 8,500 | — | Piossek 52', 70'; Grimaldi 65' | |
| 13 | 6 October 2012 | 14:00 | Bielefelder Alm | Bielefeld | Arminia Bielefeld | 1–0 | 9,365 | Smetana 3' | — | |
| 14 | 20 October 2012 | 14:00 | DKB-Arena | Rostock | Alemannia Aachen | 1–0 | 10,000 | Smetana 45' | — | |
| 15 | 27 October 2012 | 14:00 | Stadion Rote Erde | Dortmund | Borussia Dortmund II | 0–0 | 4,300 | — | — | |
| 16 | 3 November 2012 | 14:00 | DKB-Arena | Rostock | 1. FC Saarbrücken | 2–0 | 9,000 | Weilandt 15'; Plat 35' | — | |
| 17 | 9 November 2012 | 19:00 | Sparda Bank Hessen Stadium | Offenbach am Main | Kickers Offenbach | 1–2 | 8,079 | Albrecht 86' | Vogler 41', 47' | |
| 18 | 17 November 2012 | 14:00 | DKB-Arena | Rostock | Karlsruher SC | 0–3 | 10,000 | — | Mauersberger 53'; Kempe 78'; Soriano 84' | |
| 19 | 24 November 2012 | 14:00 | Steigerwaldstadion | Erfurt | Rot-Weiß Erfurt | 1–1 | 9,058 | Weilandt 25' | Pfingsten-Reddig 45'+1' (pen.) | |
| 20 | 1 December 2012 | 14:00 | Gazi-Stadion auf der Waldau | Stuttgart | Stuttgarter Kickers | 0–2 | 4,050 | — | Grüttner 57'; Leutenecker 83' | |
| 21 | 8 December 2012 | 14:00 | DKB-Arena | Rostock | SpVgg Unterhaching | 0–1 | 6,700 | — | Voglsammer 88' | |
| 22 | 15 December 2012 | 14:00 | Karl-Liebknecht-Stadion | Potsdam | Babelsberg 03 | Postponed | | | | |
| 23 | 26 January 2013 | 14:00 | DKB-Arena | Rostock | Preußen Münster | 0–2 | 9,000 | — | Siegert 38' (pen.); Königs 85' | |
| 24 | 2 February 2013 | 14:00 | Stadion an der Gellertstraße | Chemnitz | Chemnitzer FC | 1–2 | 6,400 | Weilandt 49' | Förster 69'; Fink 73' (pen.) | |
| 25 | | 14:00 | DKB-Arena | Rostock | Darmstadt 98 | Postponed | | | | |
| 26 | 15 February 2013 | 18:30 | DKB-Arena | Rostock | Wacker Burghausen | Postponed | | | | |
| 27 | 21 February 2013 | 18:30 | BRITA-Arena | Wiesbaden | Wehen Wiesbaden | 1–2 | 3,011 | Plat 37' | Vunguidica 24'; Janjić 80' | |
| 28 | 2 March 2013 | 14:00 | DKB-Arena | Rostock | 1. FC Heidenheim | 0–2 | 7,700 | — | Haas 38' (o.g.); Thurk 80' | |
| 26 | 6 March 2013 | 19:00 | DKB-Arena | Rostock | Wacker Burghausen | 1–0 | 7,000 | Leemans 26' | — | |
| 29 | 10 March 2013 | 14:00 | Erdgas Sportpark | Halle | Hallescher FC | 1–3 | 12,693 | Plat 20' | Furuholm 11', 30'; Hartmann 14' | |
| 30 | 16 March 2013 | 14:00 | DKB-Arena | Rostock | VfB Stuttgart II | 0–0 | 7,300 | — | — | |
| 25 | 23 March 2013 | 14:00 | DKB-Arena | Rostock | Darmstadt 98 | 0–0 | 7,400 | — | — | |
| 31 | 30 March 2013 | 14:00 | Osnatel-Arena | Osnabrück | VfL Osnabrück | | | | | |
| 32 | 6 April 2013 | 14:00 | DKB-Arena | Rostock | Arminia Bielefeld | | | | | |
| 33 | 12 April 2013 | 19:00 | New Tivoli | Aachen | Alemannia Aachen | | | | | |
| 22 | 16 April 2013 | 19:00 | Karl-Liebknecht-Stadion | Potsdam | Babelsberg 03 | | | | | |
| 34 | | | DKB-Arena | Rostock | Borussia Dortmund II | | | | | |
| 35 | | | Ludwigsparkstadion | Saarbrücken | 1. FC Saarbrücken | | | | | |
| 36 | | | DKB-Arena | Rostock | Kickers Offenbach | | | | | |
| 37 | 11 May 2013 | 13:30 | Wildparkstadion | Karlsruhe | Karlsruher SC | | | | | |
| 38 | 18 May 2013 | 13:30 | DKB-Arena | Rostock | Rot-Weiß Erfurt | | | | | |

==== Table ====
| Pos | Team | Pld | W | D | L | GF | GA | GD | Pts |
|---|---|---|---|---|---|---|---|---|---|
| 10 | Hallescher FC | 38 | 12 | 10 | 16 | 37 | 50 | −13 | 46 |
| 11 | 1. FC Saarbrücken | 38 | 12 | 9 | 17 | 52 | 62 | −10 | 45 |
| 12 | Hansa Rostock | 38 | 11 | 11 | 16 | 39 | 52 | −13 | 44 |
| 13 | Rot-Weiß Erfurt | 38 | 11 | 11 | 16 | 44 | 58 | −14 | 44 |
| 14 | VfB Stuttgart II (Note: Reserve teams are ineligible for promotion or DFB-Pokal qualification.) | 38 | 11 | 10 | 17 | 35 | 42 | −7 | 43 |

Source: kicker
Rules for classification: 1) points; 2) goal difference; 3) number of goals scored.

==== Results summary ====
| Overall | | | | | | | | Home | | | | | | Away | | | | | |
| Pld | W | D | L | GF | GA | GD | Pts | W | D | L | GF | GA | GD | W | D | L | GF | GA | GD |
|---|---|---|---|---|---|---|---|---|---|---|---|---|---|---|---|---|---|---|---|
| 29 | 9 | 7 | 13 | 26 | 38 | −12 | 34 | 6 | 4 | 5 | 13 | 14 | −1 | 3 | 3 | 8 | 13 | 24 | −11 |

Last updated: 23 March 2013.
Source: Fussballdaten.de

=== DFB-Pokal ===
| Round | Date | Time | Venue | City | Opponent | Result^{1} | Attendance | Hansa goalscorers | Source |
|---|---|---|---|---|---|---|---|---|---|
| 1 | 19 August 2012 | 18:30 | DKB-Arena | Rostock | 1. FC Kaiserslautern | 1–3 | 7,700 | Plat 77' | |

=== Mecklenburg-Vorpommern Cup ===
| Round | Date | Time | Stadium | City | Opponent | Result | Attendance | Goalscorers | | Source |
| Round | Date | Time | Stadium | City | Opponent | Result | Attendance | Hansa Rostock | Opponent | Source |
|---|---|---|---|---|---|---|---|---|---|---|
| 1 | Bye | | | | | | | | | |
| 2 | 8 September 2012 | 14:30 | Jahnstadion | Güstrow | Güstrower SC | 5–0 | 2,000 | Weilandt 3', 26', 38'; Smetana 24'; Blum 51' | — | |
| 3 | 13 October 2012 | 14:00 | Gießerei-Arena | Torgelow | Torgelower SV Greif | 2–0 | 2,200 | Plat 7'; Weilandt 40' | — | |

== Squad and statistics ==
As of 23 March 2013

| No. | Pos | Nat | Player | Total | | 3. Liga | | DFB-Pokal | | Mecklenburg-Vorpommern Cup | |
| No. | Pos | Nat | Player | Apps | Goals | Apps | Goals | Apps | Goals | Apps | Goals |
Goalkeepers
| 1 | GK | (Germany) GER | Jörg Hahnel | 3 | 0 | 2 | 0 | 0 | 0 | 1 | 0 |
| 19 | GK | (Germany) GER | Kevin Müller | 23 | 0 | 21 | 0 | 1 | 0 | 1 | 0 |
| 22 | GK | (Germany) GER | Johannes Brinkies | 7 | 0 | 7 | 0 | 0 | 0 | 0 | 0 |
Defenders
| 2 | DF | (Germany) GER | Patrick Wolf | 7 | 0 | 6 | 0 | 1 | 0 | 0 | 0 |
| 3 | DF | (Germany) GER | Matthias Holst | 27 | 0 | 26 | 0 | 0 | 0 | 1 | 0 |
| 4 | DF | (Germany) GER | Tommy Grupe | 5 | 0 | 5 | 0 | 0 | 0 | 0 | 0 |
| 5 | DF | (Austria) AUT | Andreas Pfingstner | 0 | 0 | 0 | 0 | 0 | 0 | 0 | 0 |
| 13 | DF | (Germany) GER | Stephan Gusche | 11 | 0 | 8 | 0 | 1 | 0 | 2 | 0 |
| 15 | DF | (Germany) GER | Ronny Marcos | 14 | 0 | 12 | 0 | 1 | 0 | 1 | 0 |
| 23 | DF | (Germany) GER | Ben Zolinski | 5 | 0 | 5 | 0 | 0 | 0 | 0 | 0 |
| 25 | DF | (Germany) GER | Sebastian Pelzer | 27 | 0 | 25 | 0 | 0 | 0 | 2 | 0 |
| 26 | DF | (Netherlands) NED | Rick Geenen | 9 | 0 | 7 | 0 | 1 | 0 | 1 | 0 |
| 28 | DF | (Germany) GER | Maurice Trapp | 6 | 0 | 6 | 0 | 0 | 0 | 0 | 0 |
Midfielders
| 6 | MF | (Belgium) BEL | Ken Leemans | 27 | 2 | 24 | 2 | 1 | 0 | 2 | 0 |
| 7 | MF | (Germany) GER | Mohammed Lartey | 1 | 0 | 1 | 0 | 0 | 0 | 0 | 0 |
| 8 | MF | (Austria) AUT | Denis Berger | 16 | 1 | 14 | 1 | 1 | 0 | 1 | 0 |
| 9 | MF | (Germany) GER | Philipp Klement | 6 | 0 | 6 | 0 | 0 | 0 | 0 | 0 |
| 14 | MF | (Germany) GER | Tom Weilandt | 28 | 9 | 25 | 5 | 1 | 0 | 2 | 4 |
| 17 | MF | (Germany) GER | Manfred Starke | 6 | 0 | 5 | 0 | 0 | 0 | 1 | 0 |
| 20 | MF | (France) FRA | Julien Humbert | 21 | 0 | 20 | 0 | 0 | 0 | 1 | 0 |
| 21 | MF | (Germany) GER | Michael Blum | 29 | 1 | 26 | 0 | 1 | 0 | 2 | 1 |
| 24 | MF | (Germany) GER | Edisson Jordanov | 12 | 1 | 11 | 1 | 1 | 0 | 0 | 0 |
| 27 | | (Germany) GER | Collin Quaner | 6 | 0 | 6 | 0 | 0 | 0 | 0 | 0 |
| 32 | MF | (Germany) GER | Nico Zimmermann | 7 | 0 | 7 | 0 | 0 | 0 | 0 | 0 |
| 33 | MF | (Germany) GER | Leonhard Haas | 20 | 0 | 18 | 0 | 0 | 0 | 2 | 0 |
Forwards
| 10 | FW | (Netherlands) NED | Johan Plat | 29 | 10 | 26 | 8 | 1 | 1 | 2 | 1 |
| 11 | FW | (France) FRA | Alexandre Mendy | 29 | 0 | 26 | 0 | 1 | 0 | 2 | 0 |
| 18 | MF | (Germany) GER | Nils Quaschner | 15 | 1 | 13 | 1 | 1 | 0 | 1 | 0 |
| 29 | FW | (Czech Republic) CZE | Ondřej Smetana | 20 | 8 | 18 | 7 | 1 | 0 | 1 | 1 |
| 31 | MF | (Czech Republic) CZE | Emil Rilke | 4 | 0 | 4 | 0 | 0 | 0 | 0 | 0 |
| | FW | (Germany) GER | Lucas Albrecht | 11 | 1 | 10 | 1 | 0 | 0 | 1 | 0 |
| | FW | (Armenia) ARM | Sargis Adamyan | 6 | 0 | 6 | 0 | 0 | 0 | 0 | 0 |
