= 2016–17 SV Wehen Wiesbaden season =

Wehen Wiesbaden
2016–17 season
- Manager: Rüdiger Rehm
- Stadium: BRITA-Arena
- 3. Liga: 15th
- Hessian Cup: Final
Home colours	Away colours
- All statistics correct as of 19 April 2017.

The 2016–17 SV Wehen Wiesbaden season is the 91st season in the football club's history. For the 8th consecutive season, Wehen Wiesbaden play in the 3. Liga. They also are participating in this season's edition of the Hessian Cup. The season covers a period from 1 July 2016 to 30 June 2017.

== Players ==
=== Squad ===
As of 26 January 2017

Note: Flags indicate national team as defined under FIFA eligibility rules; some limited exceptions apply. Players may hold more than one non-FIFA nationality.

No.	Pos.	Nation	Player
1	GK	GER	Markus Kolke
3	DF	GER	Michael Vitzthum
4	DF	GER	Sascha Mockenhaupt
5	DF	TUR	Sertan Yegenoglu
6	DF	GER	Patrick Funk
7	MF	GER	Philipp Müller
8	MF	POL	David Blacha
9	FW	GER	Manuel Schäffler
10	MF	GER	Robert Andrich
11	FW	GER	Patrick Mayer
13	DF	SVK	Vladimír Kováč
14	FW	GER	Jules Schwadorf
16	DF	GER	Niklas Dams
17	DF	GER	Daniel Wein
18	DF	GER	Steven Ruprecht
19	GK	GER	Jan Albrecht

No.	Pos.	Nation	Player
20	MF	GER	Marc Lorenz
21	MF	GER	Jann Bangert
22	DF	GER	Michael Akoto
23	DF	GER	Alf Mintzel
24	FW	GER	Luca Pascal Schnellbacher
25	GK	GER	Maximilian Reule
26	FW	GER	Patrick Breitkreuz
27	MF	GER	Kevin Pezzoni
28	MF	GER	Nils-Ole Book
29	DF	GER	Dominik Nothnagel
30	FW	AUS	Kerem Bulut
31	FW	GER	Christian Cappek
32	MF	GER	Kevin Schindler
33	DF	POL	Sebastian Mrowca
36	FW	COD	Stephané Mvibudulu
39	MF	GHA	Evans Nyarko

== Competitions ==
Win Draw Loss

=== 3. Liga ===
==== League table ====
Pos	Team	Pld	W	D	L	GF	GA	GD	Pts
5	FSV Zwickau	38	16	8	14	47	54	−7	56
6	VfL Osnabrück	38	15	9	14	46	43	+3	54
7	Wehen Wiesbaden	38	14	11	13	45	42	+3	53
8	Chemnitzer FC	38	14	10	14	54	51	+3	52
9	Preußen Münster	38	15	6	17	49	43	+6	51

Source: DFB
Rules for classification: 1) Points; 2) Goal difference; 3) Goals scored

==== Results summary ====
Overall								Home						Away					
Pld	W	D	L	GF	GA	GD	Pts	W	D	L	GF	GA	GD	W	D	L	GF	GA	GD
33	7	12	14	33	36	−3	33	6	5	6	23	15	+8	1	7	8	10	21	−11

Last updated: 16 April 2017.
Source: kicker

==== Results by round ====
Round	1	2	3	4	5	6	7	8	9	10	11	12	13	14	15	16	17	18	19	20	21	22	23	24	25	26	27	28	29	30	31	32	33	34	35	36	37	38
Ground	H	A	H	A	H	A	H	A	H	A	A	H	A	H	A	H	A	H	A	A	H	A	H	A	H	A	H	A	H	A	H	A	H	H	A	H	A	H
Result	L	D	W	W	L	L	W	W	L	W	D	D	L	L	L	D	L	D	L	D	L	D	W	W	W	W	L	D										
Position	20	19	17	17	18	18	17	16	17	17	17	17	18	18	18	18	18	18	18	18	18	17	16	16	16	16	16	16										

Updated to match(es) played on 19 March 2017. Source:
A = Away; H = Home; W = Win; D = Draw; L = Loss
