= Salif =

Salif may refer to:

== Persons ==
=== Academics ===
- Salif Diop (1957–2021), Senegalese professor of geology

=== Music ===
- Salif (rapper) (born 1982), French rapper
- Salif Keita (born 1949), Malian afro-pop singer-songwriter

=== Politics ===
- Salif Diallo (born 1957), Burkinabé politician
- Salif Traoré, Malian politician

=== Sports ===
- Salif Cissé (disambiguation), multiple people
- Salif Coulibaly (born 1988), Malian football player
- Salif Diagne, Senegalese footballer
- Salif Diallo (1957–2017), Burkinabé politician
- Salif Dianda (born 1987), Burkinabé football player
- Salif Diao (born 1977), Senegalese football player
- Salif Diao (Dutch footballer) (born 1990), Dutch footballer
- Salif Camara Jönsson (born 1983), Swedish footballer
- Salif Keïta (Malian footballer) (1946–2023), Malian football player
- Salif Keita (Senegalese footballer) (born 1975), Senegalese football player
- Salif Kéïta (Central African footballer) (born 1990), Central African Republican football player
- Salif Koné, Malian sprinter
- Salif Lebouath (born 2001), French footballer
- Salif Mane (born 2001), American triple jumper
- Salif Nogo (born 1986), Burkina Faso-French football player
- Salif Sané (born 1990), French football player of Senegalese origin
- Salif Sanou (born 1967), Burkinabé footballer

== Places ==
- As-Salif, coastal village in western Yemen
- As Salif District, district of Al Hudaydah Governorate, Yemen

== Others ==
- Centre Salif Keita a.k.a. CSK, Malian football club based in Bamako
  - Stade Centre Salif Keita, sports stadium in Bamako, Mali
- Juicy Salif, lemon squeezer designed by Philippe Starck
