= Denis Perger =

Slovenian footballer

Personal information
- Date of birth: 10 June 1993 (age 33)
- Place of birth: Ptuj, Slovenia
- Height: 1.79 m (5 ft 10 in)
- Position: Defender

Team information
- Current team: SV Wildon
- Number: 6

Youth career
- –2010: Drava Ptuj
- 2010: Parma
- 2011–2012: Koper

Senior career*
Years	Team	Apps	(Gls)
2010–2011	Drava Ptuj	18	(0)
2011–2013	Koper	21	(0)
2013–2014	SC Freiburg	0	(0)
2013–2014	→ SV Wehen Wiesbaden (loan)	13	(0)
2014–2015	SC Freiburg II	9	(0)
2015–2016	Drava Ptuj	24	(1)
2016–2017	Lechia Gdańsk	0	(0)
2019	Deutschlandsberger SC	11	(1)
2020–	SV Wildon	90	(4)

International career
	Slovenia U15	1	(0)
2009	Slovenia U16	2	(0)
2010	Slovenia U18	2	(0)
2011–2012	Slovenia U19	4	(0)
2013	Slovenia U20	1	(0)
2013	Slovenia U21	1	(0)
- * Club domestic league appearances and goals as of 10 June 2024

Denis Perger (born 10 June 1993) is a Slovenian professional footballer who plays as a defender for SV Wildon.

== Club career ==
Perger began his career with the youth setup of NK Drava Ptuj, his hometown club. In January 2010, Perger was signed to a youth contract by Parma of Italy's Serie A but was released only six months later. Perger then re-signed for Ptuj before signing for FC Koper of the Slovenian PrvaLiga, the top level of football in the country. In total, Perger appeared in three league matches with Ptuj and 24 league matches for Koper.

In July during the Summer 2013 transfer window, Perger was signed by SC Freiburg of Germany's Bundesliga until 30 June 2014 and immediately loaned to SV Wehen Wiesbaden of the 3. Liga for the 2013–14 3. Liga season so that Perger could get playing time at a high level. At Wiesbaden, Perger was assigned the number 13 and it was expected that he would fill the roster spots left empty by injuries to defenders Daniel Döringer and Maximilian Ahlschwede.

Perger returned to SC Freiburg from his loan in May 2014 after making 13 first team appearances for Wiesbaden.

== International career ==
Perger represented Slovenia at all youth levels from under-15 to under-21. He made his debut for the under-21 team on 6 February 2013 in a friendly against Portugal.
