= Robin Binder =

German footballer

Personal information
- Full name: Robin Binder
- Date of birth: 6 October 1994 (age 32)
- Place of birth: Ludwigsburg, Germany
- Height: 1.75 m (5 ft 9 in)
- Position: Midfielder

Team information
- Current team: 1. CfR Pforzheim

Youth career
- SGV Freiberg
- –2011: SpVgg Ludwigsburg
- 2011–2013: Sonnenhof Großaspach

Senior career*
Years	Team	Apps	(Gls)
2014–2016	Sonnenhof Großaspach	12	(0)
2017	Eintracht Trier	0	(0)
2017–	1. CfR Pforzheim	1	(0)
- * Club domestic league appearances and goals as of 15 April 2017 (UTC)

Robin Binder (born 6 October 1994) is a German footballer who plays as a midfielder for 1. CfR Pforzheim.
