= Salif Cissé =

Salif Cissé may refer to:

- Salif Cissé (footballer, born 1992), French football forward
- Salif Cissé (footballer, born 1994), German football midfielder
