= Schnellbacher =

Schnellbacher is a surname. Notable people with the surname include:

- Luca Schnellbacher (born 1994), German footballer;
- Otto Schnellbacher (1923–2008), American football and basketball player.
