= Stadion im Brötzinger Tal =

Sports venue in Pforzheim, Germany

Coordinates: 48°52′57.5″N 8°39′42.2″E

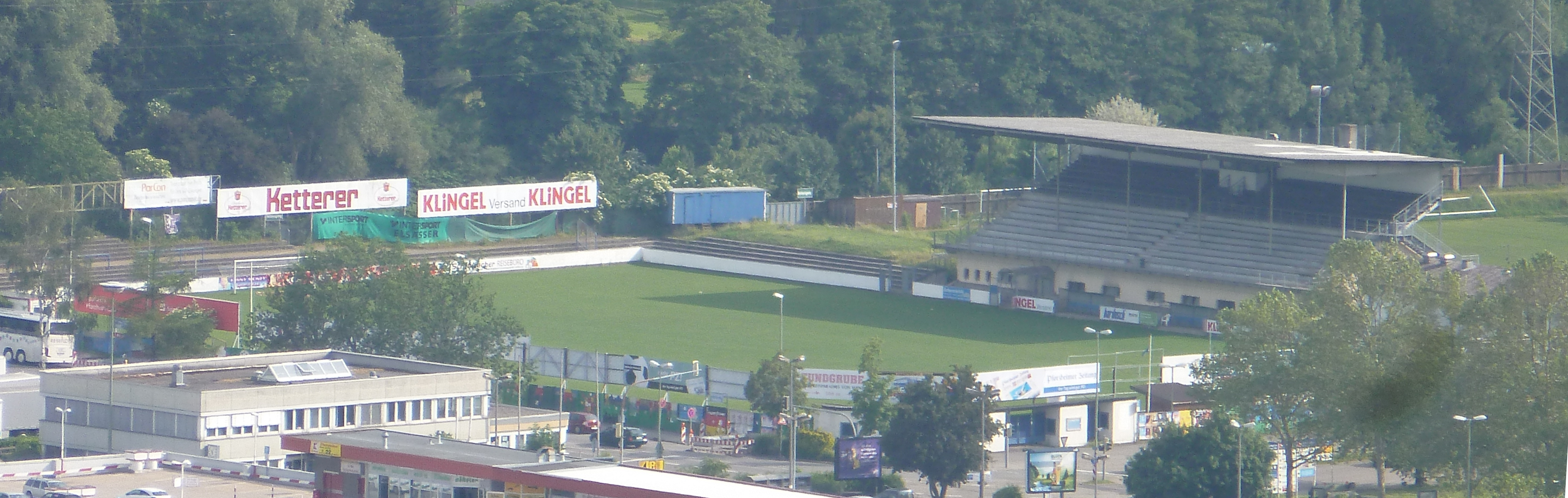
Stadion im Brötzinger Tal

Stadion im Brötzinger Tal is a stadium located in Pforzheim, Germany, which is used primarily by 1. CfR Pforzheim. It was built in 1913 and has a capacity of 10,000 people. The stadium hosted part of the European Monsters of Rock tour in 1987.
