= Mario Pokar =

German footballer

Personal information
- Date of birth: 18 January 1990 (age 36)
- Place of birth: Usingen, Germany
- Height: 1.83 m (6 ft 0 in)
- Position: Midfielder

Youth career
- Kickers Offenbach
- –2007: Eintracht Frankfurt
- 2006: → Blackburn Rovers (loan)

Senior career*
Years	Team	Apps	(Gls)
2007–2009	Eintracht Frankfurt II	8	(2)
2009–2010	SV Sandhausen	6	(1)
2010–2011	KSV Hessen Kassel	28	(2)
2011–2012	Eintracht Frankfurt II	16	(3)
2012–2016	1. FC Kaiserslautern II	130	(33)
2015	→ 1. FC Kaiserslautern	1	(0)
2016–2021	F91 Dudelange	97	(18)
2021–2023	RFCU Luxembourg	28	(0)
- * Club domestic league appearances and goals as of 06:19, 4 July 2024 (UTC)

Mario Pokar (born 18 January 1990) is a German professional footballer who most recently played as a midfielder for RFCU Luxembourg.
