= Heiko Schwarz =

German footballer

Personal information
- Full name: Heiko Schwarz
- Date of birth: 23 August 1989 (age 37)
- Place of birth: Cottbus, East Germany
- Height: 1.80 m (5 ft 11 in)
- Position: Midfielder

Team information
- Current team: ASCK Simbach/Inn
- Number: 21

Youth career
- 1996–2008: Energie Cottbus

Senior career*
Years	Team	Apps	(Gls)
2007–2011	Energie Cottbus II	50	(6)
2009–2011	Energie Cottbus	5	(0)
2011–2013	Wacker Burghausen	32	(4)
2013–2014	SV Babelsberg 03	26	(1)
2014–2016	Wacker Burghausen	9	(0)
2016–	ASCK Simbach/Inn	53	(7)

Managerial career
- 2017–: ASCK Simbach/Inn
- * Club domestic league appearances and goals as of 12 February 2021

Heiko Schwarz (born 23 August 1989 in Cottbus) is a German footballer who plays for ASCK Simbach/Inn.

Schwarz made his professional debut for FC Energie Cottbus as a substitute for Alexander Bittroff in a 2. Fußball-Bundesliga match against Karlsruher SC in 2009.
