= Marcus Mann (footballer) =

German footballer (born 1984)

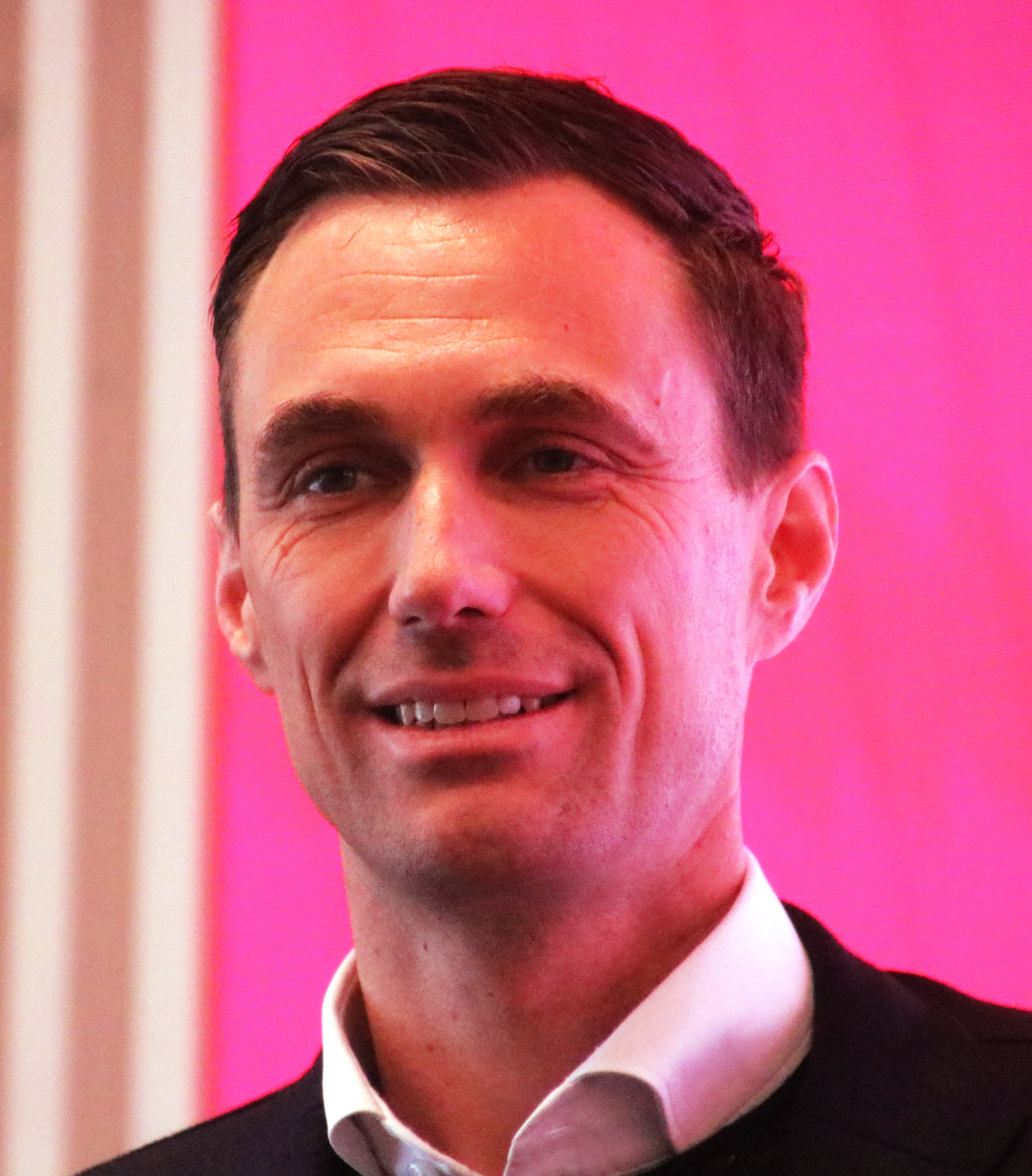
- Mann in 2026

Personal information
- Date of birth: 14 March 1984 (age 42)
- Place of birth: Leonberg, West Germany
- Height: 1.81 m (5 ft 11 in)
- Positions: Defender; midfielder

Team information
- Current team: Red Bull Salzburg (managing director)

Youth career
- –1995: SKV Rutesheim
- 1995–2002: Karlsruher SC

Senior career*
Years	Team	Apps	(Gls)
2002–2006	Karlsruher SC II	85	(19)
2004–2006	Karlsruher SC	2	(0)
2006–2007	Darmstadt 98	31	(3)
2007–2009	Stuttgarter Kickers	66	(3)
2009–2011	1. FC Saarbrücken	61	(7)
2011–2014	SV Wehen Wiesbaden	72	(5)
2014–2016	1899 Hoffenheim II	38	(2)
Total		355	(39)

Managerial career
- 2016–2020: 1. FC Saarbrücken (sporting director)
- 2019: 1. FC Saarbrücken (interim manager)
- 2020–2021: 1899 Hoffenheim (head of youth)
- 2021–2025: Hannover 96 (sporting director)
- 2025: Hannover 96 (managing director)
- 2026–: Red Bull Salzburg (managing director)
- * Club domestic league appearances and goals

Marcus Mann (born 14 March 1984) is a German former footballer and current managing director of Red Bull Salzburg.

== Club career ==
Mann began his career with Karlsruher SC, and broke into the first team in 2004, making two appearances in the 2. Bundesliga. He left the club in 2006, and spent the next two years in the Regionalliga Süd, playing for SV Darmstadt 98 and then Stuttgarter Kickers. In 2008, Kickers had qualified for the new 3. Liga, but were relegated after one season, so Mann moved on, joining 1. FC Saarbrücken. He helped the club win the Regionalliga West in his first season, and then establish themselves in the 3. Liga in his second. He signed for SV Wehen Wiesbaden in July 2011, where he spent three years before joining 1899 Hoffenheim II.

== Coaching career ==
On 29 April 2016, Marcus Mann was introduced as sporting director at 1. FC Saarbrücken, after ending his active football career on 30 April 2016. Following the sacking of Dirk Lottner in December 2019, Mann was caretaker manager of Saarbrücken for the last game of 2019, a 6–0 win against TuS Rot-Weiß Koblenz.

At the beginning of July 2020, Mann took up a post as head of sport at the youth department of Bundesliga club TSG 1899 Hoffenheim, where he had ended his playing career. After one season at Hoffenheim, Mann was appointed sporting director of Hannover 96 in June 2021. In December 2022, Mann extended his contract with Hannover until June 2027. In March 2025, he was promoted to managing director, with a contract valid until 2029.

Effective 1 January 2026, Mann was signed by Red Bull Salzburg as their new managing director.

== Honours ==
- Regionalliga West (IV): 2010
