= Salif Diao (Dutch footballer) =

Dutch footballer

Personal information
- Date of birth: 27 October 1990 (age 36)
- Place of birth: Delfshaven, Rotterdam, Netherlands
- Position: Defender

Youth career
- VVOR
- Alexandria '66
- 2007–2009: Stoke City

Senior career*
| Years | Team | Apps | (Gls) |
| 2009–2010 | Austin Aztex | 0 | (0) |
| 2010–2012 | Dordrecht | 8 | (0) |
| 2013 | FC Oss | 0 | (0) |
| 2013–2015 | Capelle | 40 | (0) |
- * Club domestic league appearances and goals

Salif Diao-Jimenez (born 27 October 1990) is a Dutch footballer who plays for Dutch side VV Bolnes.

His cousin, also called Salif Diao, was a professional footballer with Liverpool.

== Club career ==
Diao played in the Stoke City youth academy and joined American side Austin Aztex in 2009. He made his professional debut however for Eerste Divisie outfit FC Dordrecht in December 2010 against RBC. He was loaned to FC Oss in January 2013.

He left VV Capelle in summer 2015 for fellow amateur side SV Bolnes.

Diao worked as a garbage man and parcel delivery driver when his professional playing career ended and opened a performance center in Capelle aan den IJssel in 2017.
