= Julian Wießmeier =

German footballer (born 1992)

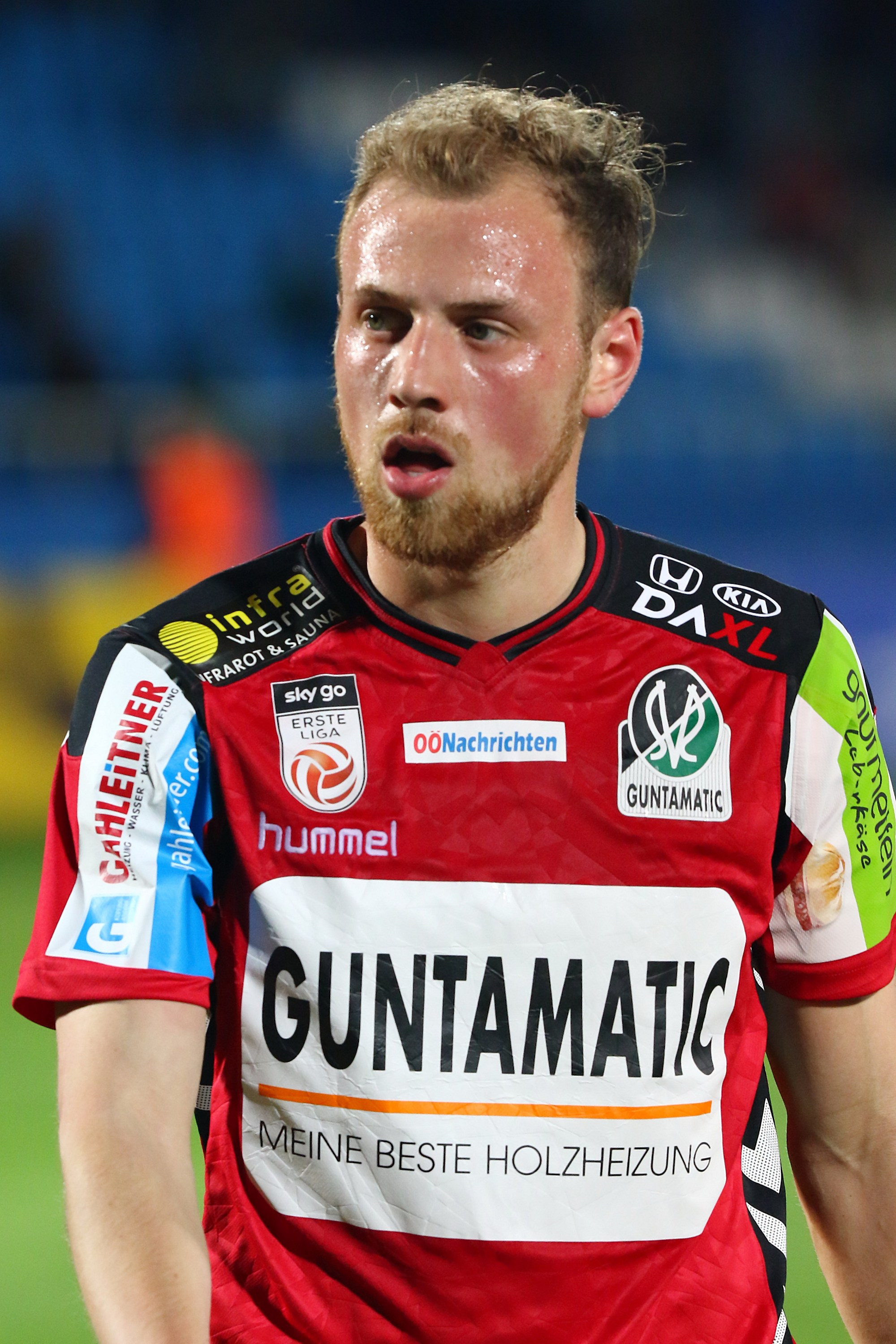
- Wießmeier in 2018

Personal information
- Date of birth: 4 November 1992 (age 34)
- Place of birth: Nuremberg, Germany
- Height: 1.71 m (5 ft 7 in)
- Position: Midfielder

Team information
- Current team: Dornbirn
- Number: 31

Youth career
- –1999: VfR Moorenbrunn
- 1999–2004: SV 1873 Nürnberg Süd
- 2004–2010: FC Nürnberg

Senior career*
| Years | Team | Apps | (Gls) |
| 2011–2015 | FC Nürnberg | 9 | (1) |
| 2011–2015 | FC Nürnberg II | 66 | (21) |
| 2012–2013 | → Jahn Regensburg (loan) | 19 | (1) |
| 2013–2014 | → Wehen Wiesbaden (loan) | 3 | (0) |
| 2015–2017 | Austria Lustenau | 49 | (24) |
| 2017–2023 | SV Ried | 169 | (35) |
| 2023–2025 | BFC Dynamo | 58 | (2) |
| 2025– | Dornbirn | 26 | (3) |

International career
| 2011 | Germany U19 | 2 | (0) |
| 2011–2012 | Germany U20 | 6 | (2) |
- * Club domestic league appearances and goals as of 26 June 2026

Julian Wießmeier (born 4 November 1992) is a German professional footballer who plays as a midfielder for Austrian club Dornbirn. Wießmeier has previously played for Austrian Bundesliga club SV Ried.
