= Ken Leemans =

Belgian footballer

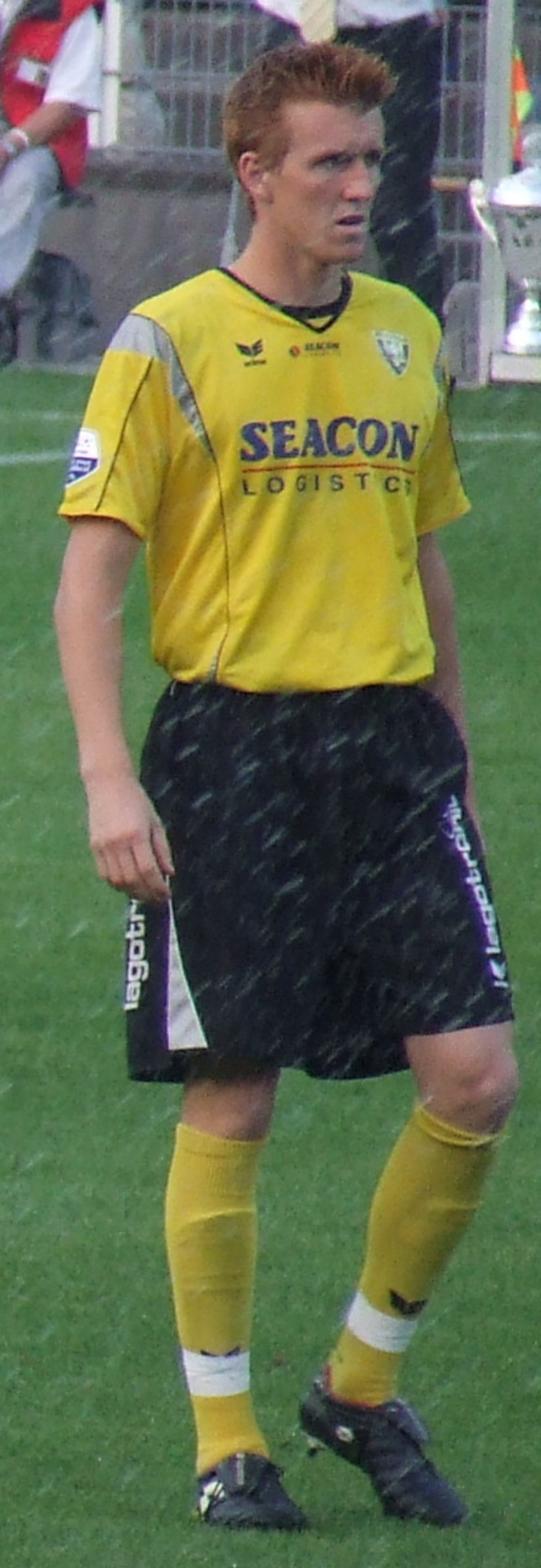

Personal information
- Date of birth: 5 January 1983 (age 43)
- Place of birth: Vilvoorde, Belgium
- Height: 1.86 m (6 ft 1 in)
- Position: Defensive midfielder

Youth career
- Strombeek
- Molenbeek
- K. Vilvoorde
- Mechelen

Senior career*
Years	Team	Apps	(Gls)
2001–2002	Mechelen	9	(0)
2003–2007	Roda JC	25	(0)
2003–2005	→ VVV-Venlo (loan)	54	(5)
2007–2012	VVV-Venlo	112	(11)
2012–2014	Hansa Rostock	34	(3)
2014–2016	De Treffers	41	(5)
- * Club domestic league appearances and goals as of 21 October 2016

Ken Leemans (born 5 January 1983, in Vilvoorde) is a former Belgian footballer.

== Career ==
Leemans is a midfielder who was born in Vilvoorde and made his debut in professional football, being part of the KV Mechelen squad in the 2000–01 season. He also played for Roda JC before joining VVV Venlo for the second time in his career.

On 24 April 2009, Leemans scored the decisive 1–0 goal in the match against HFC Haarlem in the Jupiler League, which resulted in promotion to VVV-Venlo. That means that VVV will be playing in the Eredivisie in the 2009/10 season.
