= Maciej Zięba =

Polish-German footballer

Personal information
- Date of birth: 24 January 1987 (age 39)
- Place of birth: Chocianów, Polish People's Republic
- Height: 1.76 m (5 ft 9 in)
- Position: Midfielder

Team information
- Current team: SC Düsseldorf-West
- Number: 10

Youth career
- –2004: SV Wermelskirchen
- 2004–2005: Wuppertaler SV
- 2005–2007: SV Wermelskirchen

Senior career*
Years	Team	Apps	(Gls)
2007–2011	Bayer Leverkusen II	111	(30)
2011–2012	Wuppertaler SV Borussia	31	(9)
2012–2014	SV Wehen Wiesbaden	54	(3)
2015–2016	Alemannia Aachen	27	(5)
2016–2017	BSV Schwarz-Weiß Rehden	27	(5)
2017–	SC Düsseldorf-West	78	(14)
- * Club domestic league appearances and goals as of 11 January 2021

Maciej Zięba (born 24 January 1987) is a Polish-German footballer who plays for German club SC Düsseldorf-West.
