= Salif Diop =

Senegalese professor of earth and space sciences

- Born: 31 October 1950; Dakar, Senegal, West Africa
- Died: Dakar, Senegal West Africa
- Occupations: Academician; Scientist
- Spouse: Dr. Fatou DIOP
- Awards: 2007 Nobel Peace Prize Certificate

Academic background
- Education: Blaise Diagne High School; University of Dakar; University Louis Pasteur

Academic work
- Institutions: University of Dakar; UNESCO

El Hadji Salif Diop (October 31, 1950 — 27 December 2021) was a Senegalese professor of Geological, Environmental, Earth & Space Sciences. He was the Director of the Ecosystems Section, UNEP Division of Early Warning and Assessment, Nairobi, Kenya, the Vice-Chair of the International Lakes Environment Committee Foundation (ILEC) Scientific Committee, a Member of the African Academy of Sciences, The World Academy of Sciences and a beneficiary of the 2007 Nobel Peace Prize Certificate.

== Early life and education ==
Salif Diop was born on October 31, 1950, in Dakar, Senegal, West Africa. He obtained his Bachelor's degree in Blaise Diagne High School (Dakar, Senegal ) in 1971. He obtained his License and master's degree from University of Dakar (Senegal) in1974 & 1975 respectively. In 1976 he obtained his Master of Advanced Studies in physical geography from the University Louis Pasteur (Strasbourg, France). In 1978 he obtained his Doctorate of 3rd cycle in Coastal tropical Geomorphology and in 1986 he obtained his State Doctorate degree in Physical Geography/coastal geomorphology.

== Career ==
Salif Diop became an associate Lecturer, Department of Geography, University CAD/Dakar, Senegal from 1977. A lecturer in 1978, Senior Lecturer in 1980, Head of Department in 1984, Chargé d'enseignement in1986, Maître de Conférence in 1988 and he became a Professor in 1991.

== Fellowship and membership ==
He was a Member of the Scientific Committee of the International Geological Correlation Programme/International Union for Geological Sciences, Unesco, Earth Science Division. A Member of the UNEP/UNESCO Task Team on the "Impact of Expected Climatic Change on Mangroves". A life Member and Vice-Chair of International Society for Mangrove Ecosystems located in Okinawa, Japan. He was also a Member of The African Academy of Science located in Nairobi, Kenya. A Member of 10th Term of the Scientific Committee of International Lake Environment Committee Foundation based in Shiga, Japan and a Member of The World Academy of Sciences (TWAS).
