= 1. CfR Pforzheim =

German football club

- Full name: 1. Club für Rasenspiele; Pforzheim 1896 e.V.
- Short name: 1. CfR
- Founded: 3 July 2010; 16 years ago
- Ground: Stadion im Brötzinger Tal
- Capacity: 10,000
- Chairman: Markus Geiser
- Head coach: Thomas Herbst
- League: Oberliga Baden-Württemberg (V)
- 2025–26: Oberliga Baden-Württemberg, 7th of 18
- Website: http://www.1cfr.de/
Home colours	Away colours

1. Club für Rasenspiele Pforzheim 1896 e.V., commonly known as 1. CfR Pforzheim is a football club based in Pforzheim, Germany. The club play in the Oberliga Baden-Württemberg, which is the fifth tier of football in the country.

== History ==
On 3 July 2010. The club was formed, when the two local rivals 1. FC Pforzheim and VfR Pforzheim merged to form 1. CfR

Of the two clubs, 1. FC Pforzheim had been the more successful side, even making a losing appearance in the German football championship final in 1906. In the more recent past, the club had won a championship in the then tier-three Oberliga Baden-Württemberg in 1991. Since 2004, 1. FCP had mainly been playing in the Verbandsliga Nordbaden, where it won a league title in 2006. It was this league place, the new club inherited, entering the Verbandsliga from 2010 onwards. The club also claims 1896, the formation year of 1. FCP, as its historical founding date.

VfR Pforzheim had spent most of its history in the shadow of 1. FC Pforzheim. The two clubs last encountered each other in the Oberliga Baden-Württemberg for three seasons from 1992 to 1995. VfR finished runners-up in this league in 1994–95 but, missing out on promotion, decided to withdraw to lower amateur league football for financial reasons. The club's final two seasons were spent in the tier eight Kreisliga Pforzheim, before it merged with its rival.

In its inaugural season, 2010–11, the club finished seventh in the Verbandsliga Baden and had set its aim for the 2011–12 season to finishing in the top five of the league.

In 2014, it came only seventh but finished runners-up in the league the season after and qualified for the promotion round to the Oberliga. It defeated Radolfzell and SV Göppingen to win Oberliga promotion.

== Stadium ==
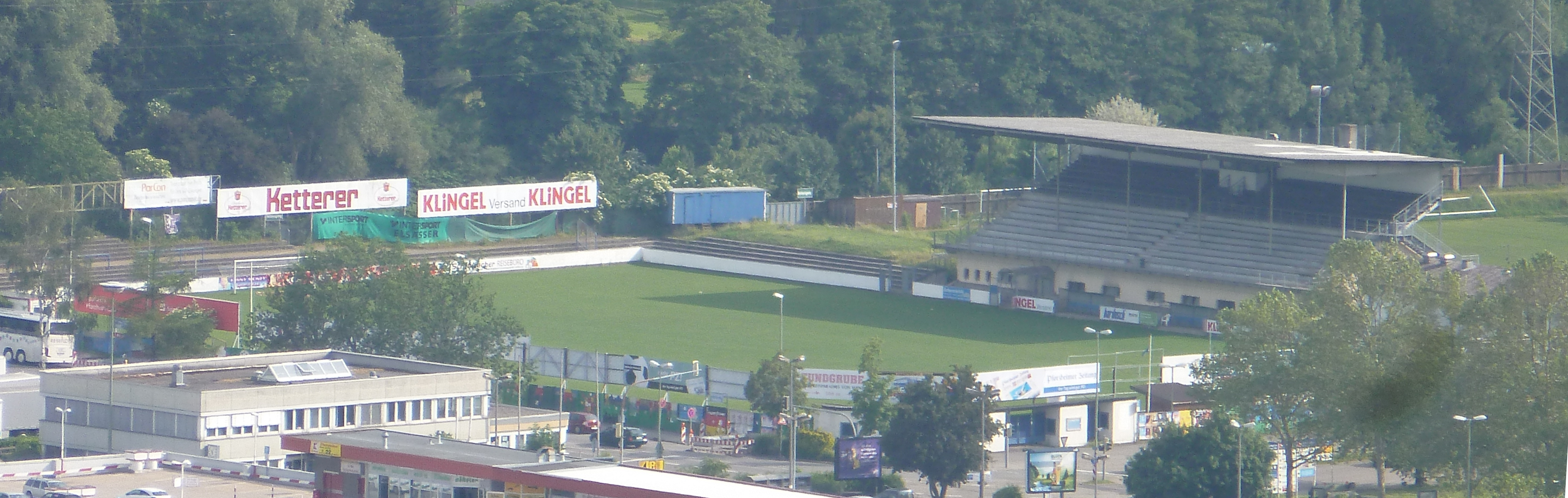
Panoramic view of the stadium

The club has played its home games at the Stadion im Brötzinger Tal is a stadium in Pforzheim, Germany. The stadium has a capacity of 10,000 people all seater. The club originally favoured the Holzhof as its permanent home ground but was unable to obtain permission from the local council to develop the ground because of its location in a protected zone.

== Players ==
=== Current squad ===
As of 10 January 2018

Note: Flags indicate national team as defined under FIFA eligibility rules; some limited exceptions apply. Players may hold more than one non-FIFA nationality.

No.	Pos.	Nation	Player
1	GK	GER	Manuel Salz
2	FW	GER	Alan Delić
3	DF	GER	Benjamin Sturm
4	DF	GER	Zvonimir Borac
5	DF	JPN	Akiyoshi Saito
6	MF	GER	Serach von Nordheim
7	MF	GER	Eldin Hadžić
8	MF	GER	Denis Gudzevic
9	FW	GER	Sven Bode
10	MF	TUR	Cemal Durmus
11	FW	BRA	Joao Tardelli
12	GK	GER	Stravros Eirinikos
13	FW	GER	Dominik Salz (captain)
14	MF	GER	Julian Grupp

No.	Pos.	Nation	Player
16	MF	GER	Tim Schwaiger
17	MF	GER	Raphael App
20	DF	GER	Robert Stark
21	GK	GER	Xaver Pendinger
23	FW	GER	Anthony Jarvis Coppola
26	MF	KOS	Besart Krasinci
27	FW	TUR	Salman Can Torun
30	MF	KOS	Kushtrim Lushtaku
37	DF	USA	Toni Suddoth
42	MF	GER	Laurin Masurica
44	FW	GER	Theofilos Jan Orfanidis
71	DF	GER	Ruben Seyram Reisig
—	FW	KOS	Kreshnik Lushtaku

== Personnel ==
As of 4 January 2018

Current technical staff
Position	Name
Head coach	(Turkey) Gökhan Gökçe
Assistant coach	(Germany) Markus Zörrer
Goalkeeping coach	(Germany) Toma Trocha
Physiotherapist	(Germany) Dirk Jautze
Doctor	(Germany) Jürgen Irschina
