= Sören Reddemann =

German footballer

Personal information
- Full name: Sören-Kurt Reddemann
- Date of birth: 16 May 1996 (age 30)
- Place of birth: Zwenkau, Germany
- Height: 1.91 m (6 ft 3 in)
- Position: Centre back

Team information
- Current team: Carl Zeiss Jena
- Number: 5

Youth career
- –2006: Sachsen Leipzig
- 2006–2010: Lokomotive Leipzig
- 2010–2015: RB Leipzig

Senior career*
Years	Team	Apps	(Gls)
2015–2017	RB Leipzig II	61	(1)
2017–2019	Wehen Wiesbaden	31	(2)
2019–2020	Chemnitzer FC	34	(2)
2020–2023	Hallescher FC	74	(0)
2023–2024	VfB Lübeck	32	(1)
2024-	Carl Zeiss Jena	68	(6)
- * Club domestic league appearances and goals as of 23 September 2026

Sören-Kurt Reddemann (born 16 May 1996) is a German professional footballer who plays as a centre back for Carl Zeiss Jena.
