= Alexander Nandzik =

German footballer

Personal information
- Date of birth: 12 September 1992 (age 34)
- Place of birth: Bergisch Gladbach, Germany
- Height: 1.72 m (5 ft 8 in)
- Position: Left-back

Team information
- Current team: TuS Wagenfeld

Youth career
- –2004: SV Bergisch Gladbach
- 2004–2010: 1. FC Köln

Senior career*
Years	Team	Apps	(Gls)
2010–2011	1. FC Köln II	0	(0)
2011–2013	Fortuna Düsseldorf II	66	(3)
2013–2015	SV Wehen Wiesbaden	30	(1)
2015–2016	Chemnitzer FC	15	(1)
2016	→ Jahn Regensburg (loan)	12	(0)
2016–2020	Jahn Regensburg	76	(0)
2020	→ 1. FC Kaiserslautern (loan)	8	(0)
2020–2021	Jahn Regensburg II	3	(0)
2021	SGV Freiberg	2	(0)
2021–2022	BSV Rehden	16	(0)
2022–	TuS Wagenfeld		
- * Club domestic league appearances and goals as of 20:12, 30 July 2023 (UTC)

Alexander Nandzik (born 12 September 1992) is a German professional footballer who plays for TuS Wagenfeld.

== Career ==
In January 2020, Nandzik joined 1. FC Kaiserslautern on loan from SSV Jahn Regensburg until the end of the season.
