= Martin Röser =

German footballer

Personal information
- Date of birth: 13 August 1990 (age 36)
- Place of birth: Ludwigshafen, Germany
- Height: 1.82 m (6 ft 0 in)
- Position: Right winger

Youth career
- –2010: Ludwigshafener SC

Senior career*
Years	Team	Apps	(Gls)
2010–2013	Wormatia Worms	67	(8)
2013–2014	SV Wehen Wiesbaden	22	(2)
2014–2016	Kickers Offenbach	53	(16)
2016–2018	Hallescher FC	54	(13)
2018–2020	Karlsruher SC	24	(1)
2020–2021	VfB Lübeck	25	(3)
2021–2022	Wormatia Worms	2	(0)
- * Club domestic league appearances and goals

Martin Röser (born 13 August 1990) is a German former professional footballer who played as a right winger.

== Career ==
In May 2018, Karlsruher SC announced Röser would join the club from Hallescher FC for the 2018–19 season.

In August 2020, having been released by Karlsruher SC, Röser joined VfB Lübeck which had achieved to the 3. Liga in the previous season. He signed a one-year contract.

== Career statistics ==
=== Club ===
As of match played 6 August 2020

Appearances and goals by club, season and competition
Club	Season	League			DFB-Pokal		Total	
Club	Season	Division	Apps	Goals	Apps	Goals	Apps	Goals
Wormatia Worms	2010–11	Regionalliga Süd	20	2	—		20	2
Wormatia Worms	2011–12	Regionalliga Süd	28	3	—		28	3
Wormatia Worms	2012–13	Regionalliga Süd	18	3	2	0	18	3
Wormatia Worms	Total		66	8	2	0	68	8
SV Wehen Wiesbaden	2012–13	3. Liga	3	0	—		3	0
SV Wehen Wiesbaden	2013–14	3. Liga	19	2	—		19	2
SV Wehen Wiesbaden	Total		22	2	0	0	22	2
Kickers Offenbach	2014–15	Regionalliga Südwest	27	6	2	0	29	6
Kickers Offenbach	2015–16	Regionalliga Südwest	26	10	—		26	10
Kickers Offenbach	Total		53	16	2	0	55	16
Hallescher FC	2016–17	3. Liga	33	5	2	0	35	5
Hallescher FC	2017–18	3. Liga	21	8	—		21	8
Hallescher FC	Total		54	13	2	0	56	13
Karlsruher SC	2018–19	3. Liga	19	1	0	0	19	1
Karlsruher SC	2019–20	2. Bundesliga	5	0	0	0	5	0
Karlsruher SC	Total		24	1	0	0	24	1
Career total			219	40	6	0	225	40
