= Julian Jakobs =

German footballer (born 1990)

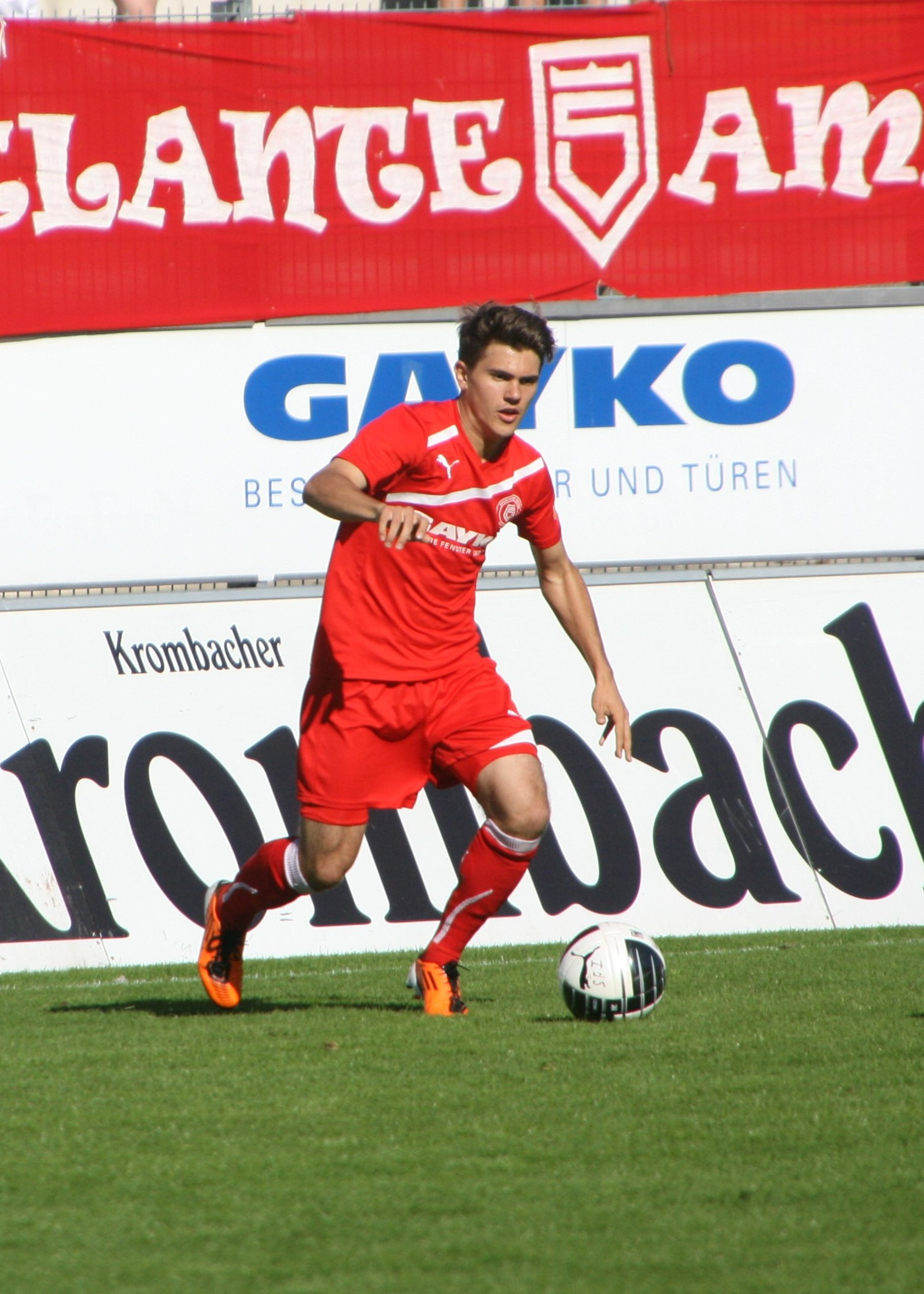
- Jakobs with Sportfreunde Siegen

Personal information
- Full name: Julian Moritz Jakobs
- Date of birth: 15 February 1990 (age 36)
- Place of birth: Siegen, Germany
- Height: 1.74 m (5 ft 9 in)
- Position: Midfielder

Youth career
- Fortuna Freudenberg
- Borussia Dortmund
- –2007: Sportfreunde Siegen
- 2007–2009: FC Schalke 04

Senior career*
Years	Team	Apps	(Gls)
2009–2013	Sportfreunde Siegen	114	(19)
2013–2015	Hansa Rostock	55	(5)
2015	→ Hansa Rostock II	1	(0)
2015–2016	TSV Steinbach	17	(0)
2016–2017	Sportfreunde Siegen	51	(7)
2017–2022	RSV Meinerzhagen	43	(1)
2022–2023	Sportfreunde Siegen	18	(0)
- * Club domestic league appearances and goals as of 09:17, 4 May 2026 (UTC)

Julian Jakobs (born 15 February 1990) is a German footballer who plays as a midfielder.
