= Julian Grupp =

German footballer

Personal information
- Date of birth: 29 July 1991 (age 35)
- Place of birth: Schwäbisch Gmünd, Germany
- Height: 1.83 m (6 ft 0 in)
- Position: Full back

Team information
- Current team: Neckarsulmer SU
- Number: 14

Youth career
- TSGV Waldstetten
- 1. FC Normannia Gmünd
- –2006: VfB Stuttgart
- 2006–2010: SSV Reutlingen

Senior career*
Years	Team	Apps	(Gls)
2010–2011	SSV Reutlingen	26	(2)
2012–2013	SGS Großaspach	46	(2)
2013–2015	SV Wehen Wiesbaden	38	(0)
2014	→ SV Wehen Wiesbaden II	2	(0)
2015–2016	SC Freiburg II	16	(0)
2016–2017	TuS Koblenz	36	(2)
2017–2020	1. CfR Pforzheim	80	(4)
2020–2022	SGV Freiberg	2	(0)
2022–	Neckarsulmer SU	16	(0)
- * Club domestic league appearances and goals as of 19 November 2022

Julian Grupp (born July 29, 1991) is a German footballer who plays for Neckarsulmer SU.
