= Raphael Laux =

German footballer

Personal information
- Date of birth: 22 April 1991 (age 35)
- Place of birth: Germany
- Height: 1.87 m (6 ft 2 in)
- Position: Goalkeeper

Team information
- Current team: TuS Dietkirchen
- Number: 1

Youth career
- SC Offheim
- JSG Dietkirchen-Offheim
- –2010: SV Wehen Wiesbaden

Senior career*
Years	Team	Apps	(Gls)
2010–2015	SV Wehen Wiesbaden II	82	(1)
2010–2015	SV Wehen Wiesbaden	1	(0)
2015–	TuS Dietkirchen	169	(8)
- * Club domestic league appearances and goals as of 18 November 2022

Raphael Laux is a German professional footballer who plays as a goalkeeper for Hessenliga club TuS Dietkirchen.
