= Maximilian Ahlschwede =

German footballer

Personal information
- Date of birth: 10 February 1990 (age 36)
- Place of birth: Bad Oldesloe, West Germany
- Height: 1.86 m (6 ft 1 in)
- Position: Right-back

Team information
- Current team: TuS Dassendorf
- Number: 33

Youth career
- NTSV Strand 08
- –2006: VfB Lübeck
- 2005–2009: VfL Wolfsburg

Senior career*
Years	Team	Apps	(Gls)
2009–2011	VfL Wolfsburg II	49	(1)
2011–2012	Arminia Bielefeld	3	(0)
2012–2013	Kickers Offenbach	37	(0)
2013–2015	SV Wehen Wiesbaden	26	(0)
2015–2017	Hansa Rostock	83	(3)
2017–2019	Würzburger Kickers	35	(0)
2019–2020	Hansa Rostock	49	(4)
2020–	TuS Dassendorf	31	(2)
- * Club domestic league appearances and goals as of 1 July 2022

Maximilian Ahlschwede (born 10 February 1990) is a German former professional footballer who plays as a right-back for TuS Dassendorf. During his career he played, among others, for the 3. Liga sides of SV Wehen Wiesbaden, Würzburger Kickers and FC Hansa Rostock.

== Career ==
In late January 2015, his contract with SV Wehen Wiesbaden was dissolved and he moved to fellow 3. Liga side Hansa Rostock. In 2017 he moved to Würzburger Kickers on a two-year contract but returned to Rostock afterwards.

In May 2020 he extended his contract with Rostock by one more year but later in July he decided for family reasons to dissolve the contract and quit professional football.
