= Daniel Döringer =

German footballer (born 1991)

Personal information
- Date of birth: 26 February 1991 (age 35)
- Place of birth: Frankfurt am Main, Germany
- Height: 1.82 m (6 ft 0 in)
- Position: Centre-back

Youth career
- SV 07 Kriftel
- –2008: VfB Unterliederbach
- 2008–2011: SV Wehen Wiesbaden

Senior career*
Years	Team	Apps	(Gls)
2009–2011	Wehen Wiesbaden II	25	(1)
2011–2014	Wehen Wiesbaden	44	(1)
2014–2017	FC Saarbrücken	59	(5)
2017–2018	Stuttgarter Kickers	24	(0)
Total		152	(7)
- * Club domestic league appearances and goals

Daniel Döringer (born 26 February 1991) is a German former professional footballer who played as a centre-back.

== Career ==
Döringer played at VfB Unterliederbach before moving to SV Wehen Wiesbaden. He was the captain of the Wehen Wiesbaden youth team and won the A-Youth Bundesliga with the U19 team in 2010. In the 2011 summer, he signed a professional contract until 30 June 2012.

On 26 August 2014, Döringer joined 1.FC Saarbrücken in the Regionalliga Südwest. On 20 February 2015, he extended his contract until 2017.
