= José Pierre Vunguidica =

Angolan footballer

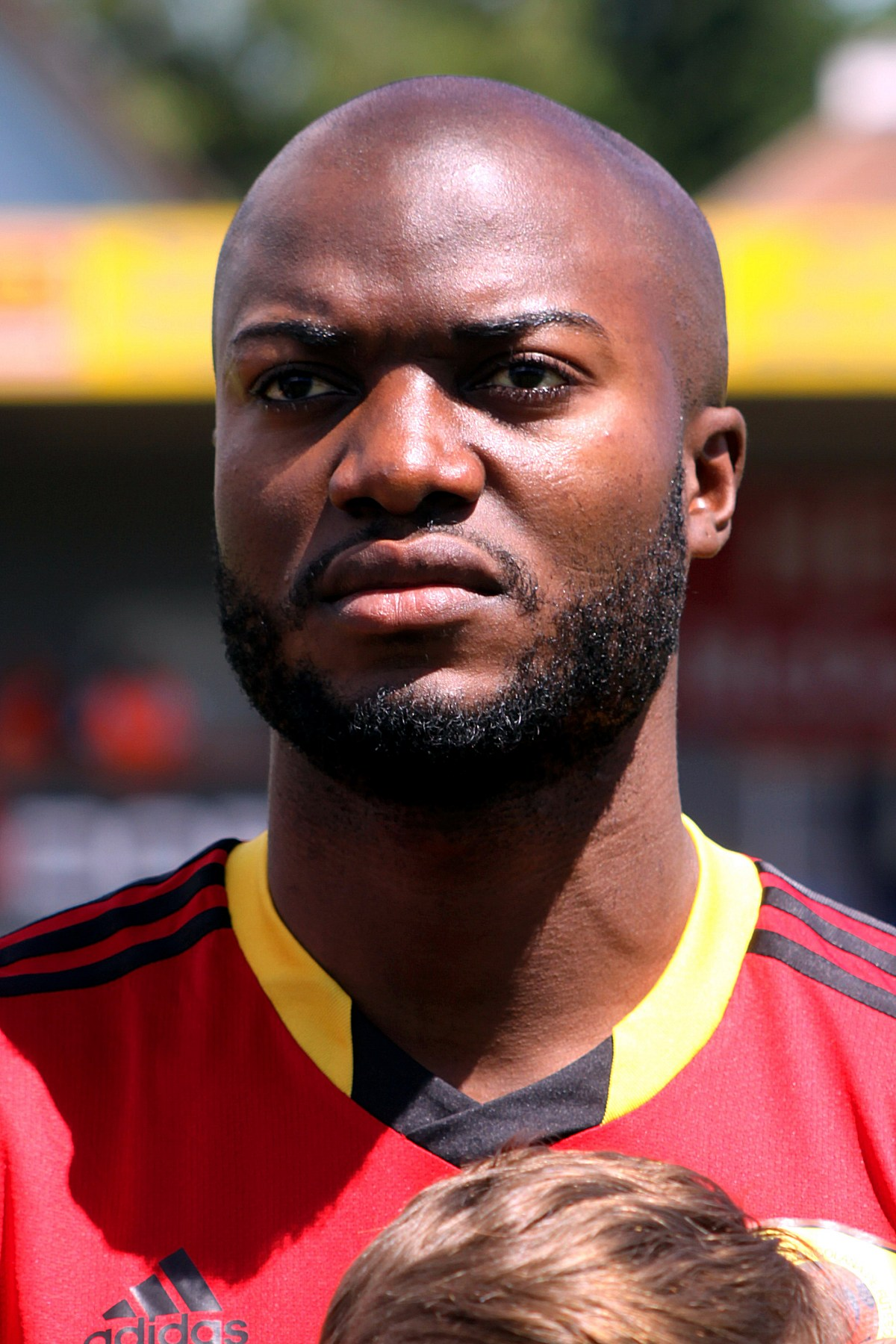
- Vunguidica in 2014

Personal information
- Full name: José Pierre Vunguidica
- Date of birth: 3 January 1990 (age 36)
- Place of birth: Luanda, Angola
- Height: 1.86 m (6 ft 1 in)
- Positions: Left winger; striker

Team information
- Current team: Eintracht Hohkeppel

Youth career
- –2005: VfL Oberbieber
- 2005–2009: 1. FC Köln

Senior career*
Years	Team	Apps	(Gls)
2009–2012	1. FC Köln II	47	(8)
2010–2012	1. FC Köln	1	(0)
2011	→ Kickers Offenbach (loan)	16	(2)
2011–2012	→ Preußen Münster (loan)	26	(4)
2012–2015	Wehen Wiesbaden	95	(28)
2015–2018	SV Sandhausen	19	(0)
2016–2018	→ SV Sandhausen II	13	(3)
2018–2021	1. FC Saarbrücken	38	(4)
2021–2023	SpVgg Unterhaching	9	(1)
2023	→ Rot-Weiß Koblenz (loan)	5	(1)
2024–	Eintracht Hohkeppel	8	(2)

International career
2009–	Angola	9	(0)
- * Club domestic league appearances and goals as of 12 May 2024

José Pierre Vunguidica (born 3 January 1990) is an Angolan professional footballer who plays for German Regionalliga club Eintracht Hohkeppel.

== Club career ==
In November 2010, he made his debut for the first-team of Bundesliga side Köln as a substitute in a 4–0 defeat against Borussia Mönchengladbach. In January 2011, he was loaned out to Kickers Offenbach. Vunguidica moved to 3. Liga club Wehen Wiesbaden on a free transfer in July 2012. Vunguidica also has competed in Regionalliga Southwest, 3.Liga and Bundesliga.

== International career ==
Vunguidica was born in Angola, but moved to Germany at the age of 2 to avoid a civil war. He has played for the Angola national football team since 2009.
