= Tobias Jänicke =

German footballer (born 1989)

Personal information
- Date of birth: 16 March 1989 (age 37)
- Place of birth: Neubrandenburg, East Germany
- Height: 1.76 m (5 ft 9 in)
- Position: Attacking midfielder

Team information
- Current team: FK Pirmasens
- Number: 14

Youth career
- 1994–2003: FC Tollense Neubrandenburg
- 2003–2009: Hansa Rostock

Senior career*
Years	Team	Apps	(Gls)
2009–2012	Hansa Rostock	99	(17)
2012–2013	Dynamo Dresden	17	(1)
2013–2015	Wehen Wiesbaden	75	(19)
2015–2017	Hansa Rostock	60	(8)
2017–2023	1. FC Saarbrücken	185	(26)
2024–	FK Pirmasens	14	(9)

International career
2010	Germany U20	1	(0)
- * Club domestic league appearances and goals as of 22 May 2024

Tobias Jänicke (born 16 March 1989) is a German professional footballer who plays as an attacking midfielder for FK Pirmasens.
