= Sascha Wolfert =

German footballer

Personal information
- Date of birth: February 26, 1990 (age 36)
- Place of birth: Aschaffenburg, Germany
- Position: Forward

Team information
- Current team: Viktoria Aschaffenburg
- Number: 11

Youth career
- FC Germania Unterafferbach
- Kickers Offenbach

Senior career*
Years	Team	Apps	(Gls)
2009–2010	Kickers Offenbach II	24	(3)
2010–2012	Eintracht Frankfurt II	50	(12)
2012–2013	1. FC Kaiserslautern II	33	(13)
2012–2013	1. FC Kaiserslautern	2	(0)
2013–2014	SV Wehen Wiesbaden	8	(0)
2014	SV Elversberg	14	(0)
2014–2015	Wormatia Worms	21	(2)
2015–	Viktoria Aschaffenburg	1	(0)
- * Club domestic league appearances and goals as of 16 July 2015

Sascha Wolfert (born February 26, 1990) is a German footballer who plays as a forward. He is currently playing for Viktoria Aschaffenburg.

== Career ==
Early in his career, Wolfert played reserve football for Kickers Offenbach, Eintracht Frankfurt and 1. FC Kaiserslautern, and made two first-team appearances for the latter, his debut coming in October 2012, as a substitute for Konstantinos Fortounis in a 2. Bundesliga match against 1. FC Köln. He signed for SV Wehen Wiesbaden in July 2013, and spent half a season with the club before moving to SV Elversberg. He left Elversberg six months later after the club were relegated from the 3. Liga.
