= Salif Cissé (footballer, born 1994) =

German footballer

Personal information
- Date of birth: 17 June 1994 (age 32)
- Place of birth: Neunkirchen, Germany
- Height: 1.82 m (6 ft 0 in)
- Position: Midfielder

Team information
- Current team: FK Pirmasens
- Number: 23

Youth career
- FV Neunkirchen
- Palatia Limbach
- TuS Wiebelskirchen
- –2011: 1. FC Kaiserslautern
- 2011–2012: SV Elversberg

Senior career*
Years	Team	Apps	(Gls)
2012–2015	SV Elversberg II	49	(2)
2013–2015	SV Elversberg	26	(1)
2015–2016	SV Saar 05 Saarbrücken	23	(2)
2016–	FK Pirmasens	116	(5)
- * Club domestic league appearances and goals as of 14:12, 22 October 2019 (UTC)

Salif Cissé (born 17 June 1994) is a German footballer of Malian and Ivorian heritage who plays for FK Pirmasens.
