= Robert Müller (footballer) =

German footballer (born 1986)

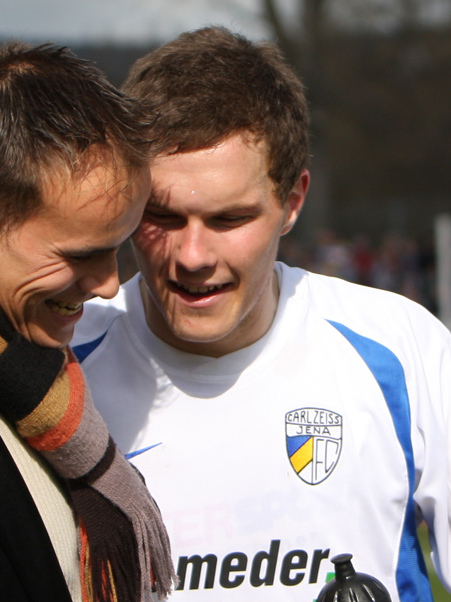
- Müller in 2008

Personal information
- Date of birth: 12 November 1986 (age 39)
- Place of birth: Schwerin, East Germany
- Height: 1.87 m (6 ft 2 in)
- Position: Defender

Youth career
- ESV Schwerin
- FSV Schwerin
- –2001: Hallescher FC
- 2001–2004: Hertha BSC

Senior career*
Years	Team	Apps	(Gls)
2004–2007	Hertha BSC II	75	(2)
2006–2007	Hertha BSC	1	(0)
2007–2009	Carl Zeiss Jena	31	(2)
2009–2010	Holstein Kiel	36	(1)
2010–2012	Hansa Rostock	63	(4)
2012–2015	SV Wehen Wiesbaden	100	(4)
2015–2018	VfR Aalen	93	(7)
2018–2019	KFC Uerdingen	2	(0)
2019–2020	Energie Cottbus	32	(0)
2020–2021	SpVgg Unterhaching	33	(1)
2021–2023	Greifswalder FC	23	(0)
Total		489	(21)

International career
2006–2007	Germany U20	3	(0)
2007	Germany U21	2	(0)
- * Club domestic league appearances and goals

Robert Müller (born 12 November 1986) is a German former professional footballer who played as a defender.

== Career ==
When Müller retired from playing in June 2023, he held the record for most appearances made in the 3. Liga with 348.
