= Nils-Ole Book =

German footballer

Personal information
- Date of birth: 17 February 1986 (age 40)
- Place of birth: Beckum, West Germany
- Height: 1.80 m (5 ft 11 in)
- Position: Midfielder

Youth career
- –1999: SpVgg Beckum
- 1999–2004: LR Ahlen

Senior career*
Years	Team	Apps	(Gls)
2004–2006	LR Ahlen	31	(3)
2004–2005	LR Ahlen II	9	(1)
2006–2008	MSV Duisburg	14	(0)
2007–2008	MSV Duisburg II	4	(2)
2008–2011	Rot Weiss Ahlen	87	(3)
2011–2017	SV Wehen Wiesbaden	128	(9)
Total		273	(18)

International career
2002	Germany U16	5	(0)
2007	Germany U21	1	(0)
- * Club domestic league appearances and goals

Nils-Ole Book (born 17 February 1986) is a German former professional footballer who played as a midfielder.

== Playing career ==
Book played for LR Ahlen, MSV Duisburg in the 2. Bundesliga and SV Wehen Wiesbaden. He was a youth international for Germany at under-16 and under-21 levels.

== Management career ==
In September 2017, Book joined SV Elversberg as a scout. A year later, on 29 October, he became the sporting director at the club. In October 2022, he was promoted to become a board member for sport starting from the 2023–24 season. Under his sporting leadership, SV Elversberg rose from the Regionalliga Südwest to the 2. Bundesliga.

In March 2026, Book became the sporting director of Borussia Dortmund, succeeding Sebastian Kehl, by signing a contract until 2029.
