= Stephan Gusche =

German footballer

Personal information
- Date of birth: 13 February 1990 (age 36)
- Place of birth: Schwerin, East Germany
- Height: 1.94 m (6 ft 4 1/2 in)
- Positions: Defender; midfielder

Youth career
- 1996–2004: Eintracht Schwerin
- 2004–2009: Hansa Rostock

Senior career*
Years	Team	Apps	(Gls)
2009–2013	Hansa Rostock	33	(2)
2013–2014	SV Wehen Wiesbaden	2	(0)
- * Club domestic league appearances and goals

Stephan Gusche (born 13 February 1990) is a German former footballer.
