= Philipp Müller (footballer) =

German footballer

Personal information
- Full name: Philipp Sven Müller
- Date of birth: 3 March 1995 (age 31)
- Place of birth: Hamburg, Germany
- Height: 1.75 m (5 ft 9 in)
- Position: Forward

Team information
- Current team: Eintracht Norderstedt
- Number: 25

Youth career
- Glashütter SV
- Eintracht Norderstedt
- –2012: Hamburger SV
- 2012–2014: VfL Wolfsburg

Senior career*
Years	Team	Apps	(Gls)
2014–2016	Hamburger SV II	46	(5)
2014–2016	Hamburger SV	0	(0)
2016–2018	Wehen Wiesbaden	46	(6)
2018–2019	Preußen Münster	23	(0)
2020–2021	Viktoria Berlin	4	(0)
2021–	Eintracht Norderstedt	17	(2)
- * Club domestic league appearances and goals as of 13 November 2022

Philipp Müller (born 3 March 1995) is a German footballer who plays as a forward for Eintracht Norderstedt.

== Career ==
=== Club career ===
Müller joined Preußen Münster for the 2018/19 season. He left the club at the end of the season. Müller remained without club until 21 January 2020, where he signed a deal until June 2021 with Regionalliga club FC Viktoria 1889 Berlin.
