= Alf Mintzel =

German former professional footballer (born 1981)

Personal information
- Date of birth: 21 December 1981 (age 44)
- Place of birth: Würzburg, West Germany
- Height: 1.80 m (5 ft 11 in)
- Positions: Left-back; midfielder

Youth career
- –2000: ASV Rimpar

Senior career*
Years	Team	Apps	(Gls)
2000–2001	ASV Rimpar		
2001–2003	Würzburger FV	67	(8)
2003–2004	Greuther Fürth	5	(0)
2003–2004	Greuther Fürth II	24	(2)
2004	1. SC Feucht	18	(0)
2005–2007	Kickers Offenbach	44	(2)
2007–2010	SV Sandhausen	76	(12)
2010–2019	Wehen Wiesbaden	274	(23)
2010–2013	SV Wehen Wiesbaden II	5	(3)
Total		513	(50)
- * Club domestic league appearances and goals

Alf Mintzel (born 21 December 1981) is a German former professional footballer who played as a left-back or midfielder.

== Career ==
Mintzel started off his career at his local club, ASV Rimpar. There he was picked up by Würzburger FV. He stayed for two years before moving to SpVgg Greuther Fürth. He was in Fürth for only a year before joining 1. SC Feucht. After less than a year he got an offer from rivals Kickers Offenbach, which he accepted. He played for Offenbach for two years, before joining SV Sandhausen for three years. In 2010, he left the club and joined his current team SV Wehen Wiesbaden, where he had a contract until 30 June 2012.

In May 2019, at the age of 37, Mintzel announced his retirement.
