= David Blacha =

Polish footballer (born 1990)

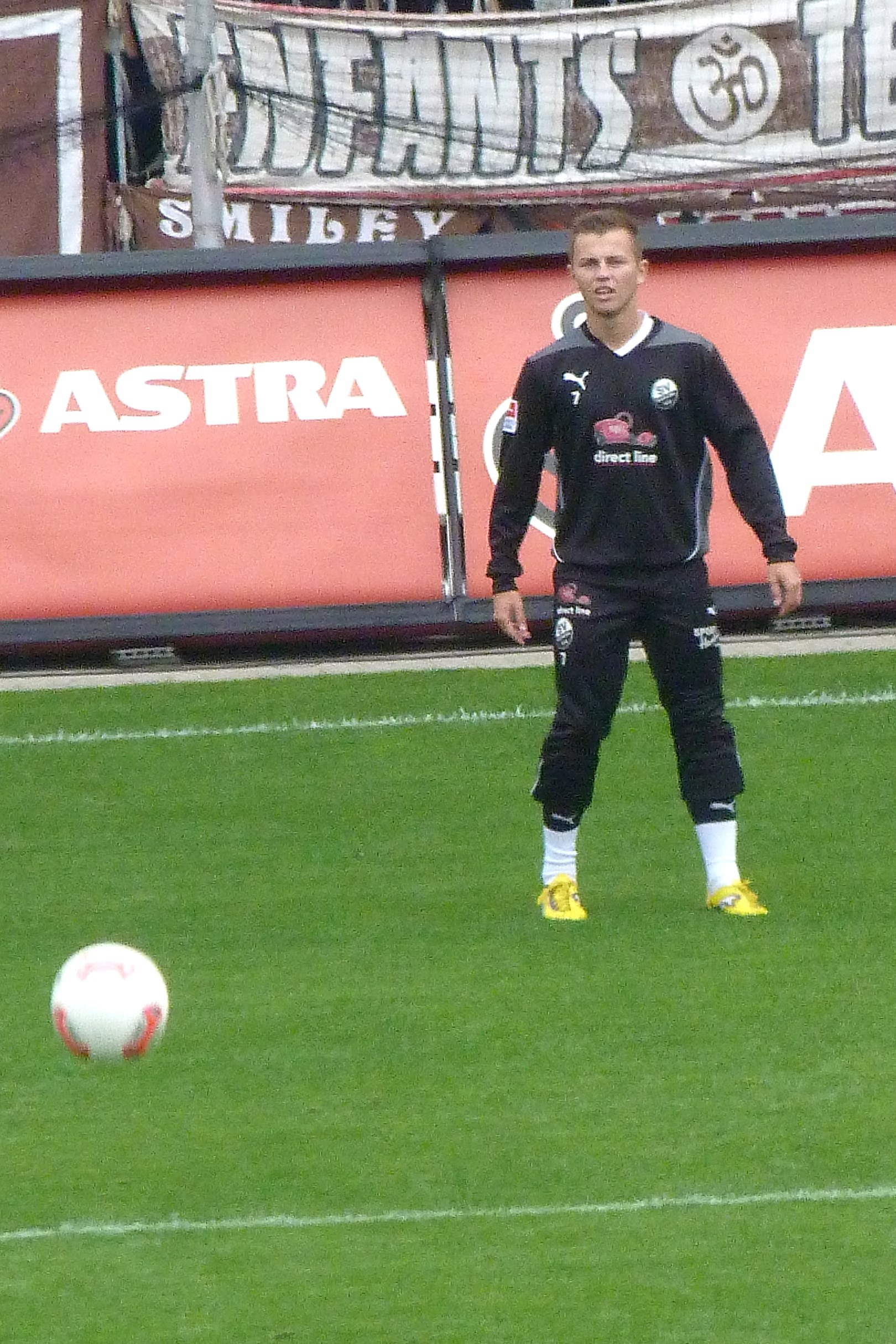
- Blacha in 2012

Personal information
- Date of birth: 22 October 1990 (age 36)
- Place of birth: Wickede, Germany
- Height: 1.74 m (5 ft 9 in)
- Position: Midfielder

Youth career
- –2000: FC 09 Fröndenberg
- 2000–2009: Borussia Dortmund

Senior career*
Years	Team	Apps	(Gls)
2009–2011	Rot Weiss Ahlen	38	(0)
2011–2013	SV Sandhausen	35	(0)
2013–2014	Hansa Rostock	56	(12)
2015–2018	Wehen Wiesbaden	110	(13)
2018–2021	VfL Osnabrück	95	(6)
2021–2023	SV Meppen	63	(4)

International career
	Poland U16	5	(1)
	Poland U17	11	(0)
	Poland U18	12	(0)
2008	Poland U19	5	(1)
- * Club domestic league appearances and goals

David Blacha (born 22 October 1990) is a former professional footballer who played as a midfielder. Born in Germany, he has represented Poland at youth level.

== Club career ==
Born in Wickede, Blacha played for FC 09 Fröndenberg and Borussia Dortmund as a youth. In July 2009, he signed a one-year contract with Rot Weiss Ahlen in the 2. Bundesliga. He made his league debut on 23 August, coming on a substitute for Christian Mikolajczak in the 66th minute against Rot-Weiß Oberhausen. Despite relegation, he signed an extension for the following season. After Ahlen was relegated again in 2011, Blacha signed a two-year contract with fellow 3. Liga side SV Sandhausen.

In January 2015, he left cash-strapped Hansa Rostock and joined promotion aspirant SV Wehen Wiesbaden signing a two-and-a-half-year contract until 2017. Despite being on a relegation spot Hansa Rostock had to sell him alike top talent Max Christiansen to fulfill conditions for retaining their 3. Liga license.

== International career ==
Blacha was part of numerous Poland youth national teams, and made his final appearances for the under-19 team in 2008.

== Honours ==
SV Sandhausen

- 3. Liga: 2011–12

VfL Osnabrück

- 3. Liga: 2018–19
