= 2010–11 Eintracht Braunschweig season =

Eintracht Braunschweig
2010–11 season
- Chairman: Sebastian Ebel
- Manager: Torsten Lieberknecht
- 3. Liga: 1st (promoted)
- DFB-Pokal: Lost in 1st round
- Krombacher-Pokal: Won
- Top goalscorer: Dominick Kumbela (19 goals)
- Highest home attendance: 23,000 (vs. Rostock)
- Lowest home attendance: 13,240 (vs. Erfurt)
- Average home league attendance: 17,425 (only league games)
Home colours	Away colours

The 2010–11 season of Eintracht Braunschweig began on 13 June with a first training session. It is the club's third consecutive season in the 3. Liga after its first start in 2008. On 10 April 2011, with a victory over SpVgg Unterhaching, Eintracht secured the promotion to the 2. Bundesliga with six matches to play. With 85 points, Eintracht got the championship of the 3. Liga and secured a victory over VfB Stuttgart II on the 36th matchday. The team scored 81 goals, the most in the league, with 22 goals against, the fewest.

== 3. Liga ==
=== 1st Half of Season Matches ===
Win Tie Loss

24 July 2010	Eintracht Braunschweig	2 – 1	Dynamo Dresden	Eintracht-Stadion, Braunschweig
14:00	Petković; Fuchs; Henn; Doğan; Reichel; (substituted off) 90+1' Bellarabi; Vrančić; (substituted off) 89' Pfitzner; Boland; 9' (substituted off) 80' (yellow card) Kumbela; 55' Kruppke (substituted on) 80' Calamita; (substituted on) 90+1' Reinhardt		Keller; Strifler (substituted off) 84'; Hübener; Herzig; Bührer (substituted off) 63'; Franke; Jungnickel; Koch (yellow card); Kegel 13'; Schuppan; Sand (substituted off) 63' Biran (substituted on) 63'; Gundersen (substituted on) 63'; Kister (substituted on) 84' (yellow card)	Attendance: 17,200; Referee: Karl Valentin

31 July 2010	1. FC Saarbrücken	0 – 3	Eintracht Braunschweig	Ludwigsparkstadion, Saarbrücken
14:00	Hubert; Forkel; Lerandy; Mann; Schutzbach; Sieger; Zeitz; Zimmermann; (substituted off) 64' Weißmann; Grgic; (substituted off) 73' (yellow card) Pisano (substituted on) 64' Özbek; (substituted on) 73' (yellow card) Fuchs		Petković; Fuchs; Henn; Doğan 64'; Reichel; Bellarabi; Pfitzner (yellow card) (substituted off) 88'; Vrančić 76' 86'; Boland; Kumbela (substituted off) 73'; Kruppke (yellow card) (substituted off) 81' Calamita (substituted on) 73' (red card) 90'; Fetsch (substituted on) 81'; Kragl (substituted on) 88'	Attendance: 7,294; Referee: Peter Sippel (München)

3 August 2010	Eintracht Braunschweig	2 – 0	SV Sandhausen	Eintracht-Stadion, Braunschweig
19:00	Petković; Fuchs; Henn; Doğan; Reichel; (substituted off) 73' Bellarabi; Pfitzner; Vrančić; Boland; 45' (pen.) (substituted off) 82' Kumbela; (substituted off) 89' Kruppke (substituted on) 73' (goal) 86' Reinhardt; (substituted on) 82' Fetsch; (substituted on) 89' Kessel		Löhe; Sievers (yellow card) (substituted off) 46'; Schulz; Pischorn; Benschneider (substituted off) 26'; Danneberg (yellow card); Pinto (substituted off) 68'; Ulm (yellow card); Fischer; Löning; Dorn (yellow card) Rohracker (substituted on) 26'; Öztürk (substituted on) 46'; Schaurte (substituted on) 68'	Attendance: 19,000; Referee: Markus Wingenbach (Diez)

25 August 2010	FC Bayern Munich II	1 – 0	Eintracht Braunschweig	Grünwalder Stadion, München
19:00	Kraft; (yellow card) Jüllich; Haas; (substituted off) 50' Leist; Alaba; (yellow card) Schwarz; Lewicki; (substituted off) 62' Mujic; (substituted off) 74' Knasmüllner; 15' Deul; Yilmaz (substituted on) 50' Kurz; (substituted on) 62' Hajdarovic; (substituted on) 74' Sansone		Petković; Fuchs; Henn; Doğan (yellow card); Reichel (substituted off) 75'; Bellarabi; Pfitzner (substituted off) 46'; Vrančić (substituted off) 71'; Boland; Kumbela; Kruppke Unger (substituted on) 46'; Fetsch (substituted on) 71'; Amrhein (substituted on) 75'	Attendance: 1,500; Referee: Christian Dingert (Thallichtenberg)

21 August 2010	Eintracht Braunschweig	1 – 2	SV Wehen Wiesbaden	Eintracht-Stadion, Braunschweig
14:00	Petković; (yellow card) Fuchs; Henn; Doğan; Reichel; 33' Bellarabi; (substituted off) 60' Pfitzner; Vrančić; Boland; (substituted off) 71' Kumbela; Kruppke (substituted on) 60' Fetsch; (substituted on) 71' Calamita		Gurski; F. Hübner; Lanzaat (yellow card); Barg; Schönheim; Fießer (substituted off) 67'; Boskovic; Menga; Janjic 40' 70' (substituted off) 77' (yellow card); Sailer (yellow card); Damjanovic (substituted off) 55' Salem (substituted on) 55'; B. Hübner (substituted on) 67' (yellow card); Wolf (substituted on) 77'	Attendance: 13,725; Referee: Jan Seidel (Hennigsdorf)

28 August 2010	SSV Jahn Regensburg	0 – 3	Eintracht Braunschweig	Jahnstadion, Regensburg
14:00	Hofmann; Jarosch; (red card) 45+3' Selimbegovic; (red card) 45' Hörnig; (yellow card) Binder; Zellner; Schlauderer; Haller; (substituted off) 60' Temür; (substituted off) 72' Stoilov; (substituted off) 46' Schmid (substituted on) 46' Szűcs; (substituted on) 60' Buch; (substituted on) 72' Formento		Petković; Kessel; Henn; Doğan; Reichel; Unger; Vrančić 49' (yellow card) (substituted off) 70'; Boland (substituted off) 85'; Kruppke 29'; Kumbela (yellow card) (substituted off) 50'; Fetsch 67' Bellarabi (substituted on) 50'; Amrhein (substituted on) 70'; Theuerkauf (substituted on) 85'	Attendance: 3,926; Referee: Martin Thomsen (Kleve)

11 September 2010	Eintracht Braunschweig	2 – 0	Rot Weiss Ahlen	Eintracht-Stadion, Braunschweig
14:00	(substituted off) 46' Petković; Fuchs; Henn; Reichel; Theuerkauf; 34' Reinhardt; 11' Unger; Vrančić; (substituted off) 67' (yellow card) Boland; (substituted off) 79' Kumbela; Kruppke (substituted on) 46' Davari; (substituted on) 67' Bellarabi; (substituted on) 79' Fetsch		Maczkowiak; Busch (yellow card); Mimbala; Flottmann; Vrzogic; Hille (substituted off) 45'; Book; Wölk (yellow card); Ghasemi-Nobakht (substituted off) 68'; Knappmann (substituted off) 57'; Taylor Piossek (substituted on) 45'; Tankulic (substituted on) 57'; Kluft (substituted on) 68'	Attendance: 13,630; Referee: Felix Zwayer (Berlin)

18 September 2010	VfR Aalen	0 – 0	Eintracht Braunschweig	Scholz-Arena, Aalen
14:00	Bernhardt; Scheuring; Sulu; Kempe; (yellow card) Bauer; Barg; (substituted off) 80' (yellow card) Kettemann; (substituted off) 75' Traut; (substituted off) 84' Kakoko; Soriano; Lechleiter (substituted on) 75' (yellow card) Dausch; (substituted on) 80' Hofmann; (substituted on) 84' Mössmer		Petković; Henn; Kessel; Doğan (yellow card); Reichel; Unger; Reinhardt (substituted off) 46'; Vrančić (substituted off) 77'; Kruppke; Fetsch (substituted off) 46'; Kumbela Bellarabi (substituted on) 46'; Boland (substituted on) 46'; Pfitzner (substituted on) 77'	Attendance: 3,175; Referee: Eduard Beitinger (Regensburg)

21 September 2010	Eintracht Braunschweig	4 – 0	Rot-Weiß Erfurt	Eintracht-Stadion, Braunschweig
18:45	Petković; Fuchs; Henn; Doğan; Reichel; (substituted off) 75' (yellow card) Bellarabi; 69' Pfitzner; (substituted off) 67' Unger; Boland; (substituted off) 82' (goal) 2' 39' Kumbela; 8' Kruppke (substituted on) 67' Theuerkauf; (substituted on) 75' Lemke; (substituted on) 82' Calamita		Orlishausen; Malura (yellow card); Pohl; Möckel; Hillebrand (yellow card) (substituted off) 46'; Zedi; Pfingsten-Reddig (yellow card) (substituted off) 46'; Weidlich; Hauswald; Caillas (yellow card); Reichwein (substituted off) 65' Ströhl (substituted on) 46'; Stenzel (yellow card) (substituted on) 46'; Lüttmann (substituted on) 65'	Attendance: 13,240; Referee: Sascha Thielert (Buchholz in der Nordheide)

26 September 2010	FC Hansa Rostock	2 – 1	Eintracht Braunschweig	DKB-Arena, Rostock
13:30	Hahnel; 90+1' Schyrba; (yellow card) (goal) 51' (pen.) Wiemann; Gusche; Pelzer; Pannewitz; (yellow card) Ziegenbein; Jänicke; Lartey; Schied; (substituted off) 73' Vujanovic (substituted on) 73' Albrecht		Petković; Fuchs; Henn; Doğan; Reichel (yellow card); Pfitzner; Bellarabi (substituted off) 89'; Boland (substituted off) 73'; Unger (yellow card); Kumbela 47'; Kruppke Fetsch (substituted on) 73'; Reinhardt (substituted on) 89'	Attendance: 13,000; Referee: Guido Winkmann (Kerken)

2 October 2010	Eintracht Braunschweig	4 – 1	TuS Koblenz	Eintracht-Stadion, Braunschweig
14:00	Petković; Fuchs; Henn; Doğan; Reichel; Bellarabi; (substituted off) 46' (yellow card) Pfitzner; (substituted off) 31' Unger; Boland; (substituted off) 85' (goal) 60' 68' (pen.) Kumbela; 83' Kruppke (substituted on) 31' (goal) 54' Amrhein; (substituted on) 46' Theuerkauf; (substituted on) 85' Fetsch		Paucken; Bender (yellow card) (substituted off) 81'; Kittner; Haben; Gentner (substituted off) 46'; Stahl; Pospischil (yellow card); Nottbeck; Steegmann (yellow card); Cannizzaro (substituted off) 72'; Rahn 3' Schmidt (substituted on) 46'; Klappert (substituted on) 72'; Laux (substituted on) 81'	Attendance: 13,740; Referee: Arno Blos (Altbach)

15 October 2010	SV Werder Bremen II	0 – 5	Eintracht Braunschweig	Weserstadion Platz 11, Bremen
19:00	Wiedwald; Ronneburg; Balogun; Stallbaum; (yellow card) Andersen; (substituted off) 72' Maek; (yellow card) Grieneisen; (yellow card) Ayik; Artmann; (substituted off) 74' Thy; (substituted off) 74' Testroet (substituted on) 72' Thiele; (substituted on) 74' Becker; (substituted on) 74' Krisch		Petković; Fuchs; Henn 52'; Doğan; Reichel; Bellarabi 40'; Amrhein (substituted off) 50'; Theuerkauf; Boland 30'; Kumbela 33' (pen.) (substituted off) 84'; Kruppke 3' (substituted off) 66' Pfitzner (substituted on) 50'; Calamita (substituted on) 66'; Kessel (substituted on) 84'	Attendance: 2,400; Referee: Florian Benedum (Mehlingen)

23 October 2010	Eintracht Braunschweig	3 – 0	SpVgg Unterhaching	Eintracht-Stadion, Braunschweig
14:00	Petković; (yellow card) (goal) 58' Fuchs; Henn; Doğan; Reichel; 9' Bellarabi; (substituted off) 85' (yellow card) Pfitzner; Theuerkauf; 49' Boland; (substituted off) 77' Kumbela; (substituted off) 69' Kruppke (substituted on) 69' Calamita; (substituted on) 77' Fetsch; (substituted on) 85' Unger		Kampa; Schulz; Hoffmann; Brysch; Stegmayer; Tyce (yellow card); Zillner; Leandro; Villar (yellow card) (substituted off) 46'; Nygaard; Tunjic (substituted off) 63' Amachaibou (substituted on) 46'; Avdic (substituted on) 63'; Hefele (substituted on) 86'	Attendance: 14,920; Referee: Christian Schößling (Leipzig)

30 October 2010	SV Babelsberg 03	0 – 3	Eintracht Braunschweig	Karl-Liebknecht-Stadion, Potsdam
14:00	Unger; Rudolph; Hoffmann; Oumari; Paul; (yellow card) Civa; (yellow card) Prochnow; Koçer; (substituted off) 46' Hahne; (substituted off) 46' Koc; (substituted off) 72' Hebisch (substituted on) 46' Makarenko; (substituted on) 46' Stroh-Engel; (substituted on) 72' Engler		Petković; Fuchs; Henn; Doğan; Reichel (yellow card); Bellarabi (substituted off) 86'; Amrhein (substituted off) 61'; Theuerkauf; Boland; Kumbela 7' (substituted off) 79'; Kruppke 6' 67' Vrančić (substituted on) 61'; Fetsch (substituted on) 79'; Reinhardt (substituted on) 86'	Attendance: 3,000; Referee: Martin Petersen (Leinfelden-Echterdingen)

6 November 2010	Eintracht Braunschweig	3 – 0	SV Wacker Burghausen	Eintracht-Stadion, Braunschweig
14:00	Petković; Fuchs; Henn; Doğan; Reichel; (substituted off) 77' Bellarabi; Theuerkauf; (substituted off) 87' Vrančić; (substituted off) 67' Boland; 20' Kumbela; 64' Kruppke (substituted on) 67' (goal) 72' Calamita; (substituted on) 77' Reinhardt; (substituted on) 87' Kessel		Vollath (yellow card); Brucia; Eberlein; Wolf; Schmidt (yellow card); Leberfinger (yellow card); Cappek (yellow card); Burkhard; Holz (substituted off) 46'; Grübl (substituted off) 79'; Agyemang (substituted off) 77' Hess (substituted on) 46'; Olumide (substituted on) 77'; Thiel (substituted on) 79'	Attendance: 15,320; Referee: Tim Sönder (Kiel)

12 November 2010	Kickers Offenbach	2 – 2	Eintracht Braunschweig	Stadion am Bieberer Berg, Offenbach
20:15	Wulnikowski; (substituted off) 66' Lamprecht; Kopilas; (yellow card) Husterer; Teixeira; (yellow card) Haas; (yellow card) Mehic; (substituted off) 77' Hayer; 9' (pen.) 21' Da Costa; Feldhahn; (substituted off) 29' Occean (substituted on) 29' Rathgeber; (substituted on) 66' (yellow card) Stadel; (substituted on) 77' Hesse		Petković; Fuchs; Henn (substituted off) 71'; Doğan (yellow card); Reichel; Theuerkauf 74'; Bellarabi 55'; Vrančić (substituted off) 46'; Boland; Kruppke; Kumbela Amrhein (substituted on) 46'; Calamita (substituted on) 71'	Attendance: 9,439; Referee: Robert Hartmann (Krugzell)

20 November 2010	VfB Stuttgart II	0 – 0	Eintracht Braunschweig	Gazi-Stadion, Stuttgart
14:00	Leno; (yellow card) Schimmel; Vier; Geyer; Vecchione; Schwarz; (substituted off) 80' Rapp; (yellow card) Rathgeb; (red card) 78' Gardawski; (substituted off) 65' Breier; (yellow card) Schipplock (substituted on) 65' (substituted off) 90' Vlachodimos; (substituted on) 80' Hertner; (substituted on) 90' Holzhauser		Petković; Fuchs; Henn; Doğan (yellow card); Reichel; Theuerkauf; Boland (substituted off) 89'; Kruppke; Vrančić (substituted off) 46'; Bellarabi (substituted off) 64'; Kumbela Calamita (substituted on) 46'; Pfitzner (substituted on) 64' (yellow card); Fetsch (substituted on) 89'	Attendance: 900; Referee: Marco Achmüller (Bad Füssing)

27 November 2010	Eintracht Braunschweig	6 – 0	FC Carl Zeiss Jena	Eintracht-Stadion, Braunschweig
14:00	Petković; Kessel; Henn; Doğan; Reichel; Theuerkauf; 56' Bellarabi; Boland; (substituted off) 88' (goal) 51' 83' Kruppke; (substituted off) 80' (goal) 41' Calamita; (substituted off) 66' (goal) 26' 59' Kumbela (substituted on) 66' Amrhein; (substituted on) 80' Unger; (substituted on) 88' Fuchs		Nulle; Eismann (yellow card); Sichone (yellow card); Voigt; Nikol; Smeekes (substituted off) 64'; Truckenbrod; Schmidt; Landeka (substituted off) 56'; Hähnge; Reimann (substituted off) 69' Riemer (substituted on) 56'; Ziegner (substituted on) 64'; Ullmann (substituted on) 69'	Attendance: 15,820; Referee: Christian Dietz (Kronach)

5 December 2010	1. FC Heidenheim	1 – 4	Eintracht Braunschweig	GAGFAH-Arena, Heidenheim
14:00	Lehmann; Meier; Beisel; Aupperle; (substituted off) 82' Feistle; Klarer; 23' Weil; (substituted off) 79' Schnatterer; (substituted off) 59' Glockner; (yellow card) Spann; (yellow card) Mayer (substituted on) 59' Gül; (substituted on) 79' Kulabas; (substituted on) 82' Bagceci		Petković; Kessel; Henn; Doğan 34' (substituted off) 90'; Reichel; Theuerkauf; Bellarabi 87'; Boland; Calamita (yellow card) (substituted off) 66'; Kruppke 75' (pen.); Kumbela (substituted off) 83' Vrančić (substituted on) 66'; Pfitzner 90+1' (substituted on) 83'; Fuchs (substituted on) 90'	Attendance: 7,240; Referee: Dominik Nowak (Bottrop)

=== 2nd Half of Season matches ===
11 December 2010	Eintracht Braunschweig	1 – 0	1. FC Saarbrücken	Eintracht-Stadion, Braunschweig
14:00	Petković; Kessel; Henn; Doğan; Reichel; Theuerkauf; Bellarabi; (substituted off) 57' Amrhein; Kruppke; (substituted off) 90' (goal) 87' Boland; (substituted off) 74' Kumbela (substituted on) 57' Calamita; (substituted on) 74' Fetsch; (substituted on) 90' Vrančić		Marina; Otto; Lerandy; Buchner; Schutzbach; Sieger; Zeitz; Özbek (substituted off) 57'; Stiefler (yellow card) (substituted off) 88'; Zimmermann; Pisano Kohler (substituted on) 57'; Fuchs (substituted on) 88'	Attendance: 15,300; Referee: Patrick Ittrich (Hamburg)

22 January 2011	Dynamo Dresden	1 – 1	Eintracht Braunschweig	Glücksgas-Stadion, Dresden
13:30	Keller; (yellow card) Strifler; Herzig; Jungwirth; (yellow card) Bührer; Koch; Jungnickel; Kegel; (substituted off) 86' Schuppan; Esswein; 74' (pen.) Schahin (substituted on) 86' Franke		Petković; Fuchs; Henn; Doğan (yellow card); Kessel; Theuerkauf; Bellarabi (yellow card); Vrančić (yellow card) (substituted off) 81'; Kruppke; Boland (substituted off) 61'; Kumbela (substituted off) 87' Calamita (substituted on) 61'; Fetsch 83' (substituted on) 81'; Unger (substituted on) 87'	Attendance: 18,796; Referee: Manuel Gräfe (Berlin)

28 January 2011	SV Sandhausen	0 – 2	Eintracht Braunschweig	Hardtwaldstadion, Sandhausen
19:00	Kornetzky; (substituted off) 87' Sievers; (yellow card) Pischorn; (yellow card) 80' (red card) Benschneider; (yellow card) Schick; (yellow card) Pinto; Schauerte; (substituted off) 77' Ulm; (substituted off) 70' Blum; Dorn; Löning (substituted on) 70' Öztürk; (substituted on) 77' Ristic; (substituted on) 87' Schulz		Petković; Kessel; Henn; Reichel; Fuchs; Theuerkauf (substituted off) 62'; Bellarabi (yellow card); Boland; Calamita (substituted off) 46'; Fetsch 63'; Kumbela (yellow card) (substituted off) 88' Bohl (substituted on) 46'; Vrančić 85' (substituted on) 62'; Amrhein (substituted on) 88'	Attendance: 2,070; Referee: Florian Steinberg (Korntal)

5 February 2011	Eintracht Braunschweig	2 – 0	FC Bayern Munich II	Eintracht-Stadion, Braunschweig
14:00	Petković; Kessel; Doğan; Washausen; Theuerkauf; (substituted off) 83' Boland; Pfitzner; Bellarabi; (yellow card) (goal) 7' Kruppke; (substituted off) 46' Bohl; (substituted off) 72' Kumbela (substituted on) 46' Vrančić; (substituted on) 72' (goal) 85' Fetsch; (substituted on) 71' Reinhardt		Riedmüller; Lewicki; Saba (substituted off) 46'; Leist; Dombrowka; Erb (substituted off) 46'; Jüllich; Mujić; Deul; B.Müller (substituted off) 71'; Wohlfarth Kurz (substituted on) 46'; Ćosić (substituted on) 46'; Pangallo (substituted on) 71'	Attendance: 16,900; Referee: Peter Gagelmann (Bremen)

11 February 2011	SV Wehen Wiesbaden	0 – 2	Eintracht Braunschweig	Brita-Arena, Wiesbaden
19:00	Gurski; (yellow card) Fall; Lanzaat; (yellow card) Schönheim; Mintzel; Abraham; Boskovic; Brosinski; Janjić; Menga; Kioyo (substituted on) 62' Masmanidis; (substituted on) 67' Sailer; (substituted on) 72' Döring		Petković; Kessel; Henn; Doğan (yellow card); Reichel (yellow card); Theuerkauf; Boland; Kruppke (substituted off) 89'; Vrančić; Bellarabi (substituted off) 90+2'; Kumbela 59' (substituted off) 67' Fetsch (substituted on) 67'; Bohl 90+1' (substituted on) 89'; Pfitzner (substituted on) 90+2'	Attendance: 5,018; Referee: Markus Schmidt (Stuttgart)

19 February 2011	Eintracht Braunschweig	2 – 0	SSV Jahn Regensburg	Eintracht-Stadion, Braunschweig
14:00	Petković; Kessel; Henn; 76' Doğan; 57' Reichel; (yellow card) Theuerkauf; Bellarabi; (substituted off) 89' Boland; (substituted off) 81' Kruppke; Pfitzner; (substituted off) 69' Kumbela (substituted on) 69' Fetsch; (substituted on) 81' Reinhardt; (substituted on) 89' Fuchs		Hofmann; Jarosch; Maul; Nachreiner; Binder; Erfen (yellow card) (substituted off) 77'; Hein (substituted off) 65'; Hörnig (yellow card); Haller; Alibaz (substituted off) 69'; Klauß Temür (yellow card) (substituted on) 65'; Buch (substituted on) 69'; Hegenbart (substituted on) 77'	Attendance: 16,556; Referee: Dr. Manuel Kunzmann (Bad Hersfeld)

26 February 2011	Rot Weiss Ahlen	0 – 3	Eintracht Braunschweig	Wersestadion, Ahlen
14:00	Maczkowiak; Blacha; (yellow card) Fleßers; Flottmann; Vrzogic; Busch; (substituted off) 63' Hille; (substituted off) 59' Book; Wölk; Piossek; Taylor (substituted on) 59' Kluft; (substituted on) 63' Celik		Petković; Kessel; Henn; Doğan 71'; Reichel (yellow card); Theuerkauf; Boland; Kruppke 42' (substituted off) 86'; Vrančić (substituted off) 81'; Bellarabi; Kumbela (substituted off) 70' Fetsch 75' (substituted on) 70'; Pfitzner (substituted on) 81'; Amrhein (substituted on) 86'	Attendance: 5,120; Referee: Benjamin Cortus (Nürnberg)

5 March 2011	Eintracht Braunschweig	2 – 0	VfR Aalen	Eintracht-Stadion, Braunschweig
14:00	Petković; Kessel; (yellow card) Henn; Doğan; Reichel; Theuerkauf; Bellarabi; (substituted off) 85' Vrančić; Kruppke; (substituted off) 70' Boland; 25' (pen.) (substituted off) 76' Kumbela (substituted on) 70' Reinhardt; (substituted on) 76' Fetsch; (substituted on) 85' Pfitzner		Bernhardt; Traut; Sulu; Kempe 14' (o.g.); Valentini (substituted off) 46'; Dausch (substituted off) 70'; Barg (yellow card); Schön; Hofmann (yellow card); Lechleiter (yellow card); Fink (substituted off) 61' Bauer (substituted on) 46'; Grüttner (substituted on) 61'; Hohn (substituted on) 70'	Attendance: 17,967; Referee: Dominik Nowak (Bottrop)

12 March 2011	Rot-Weiß Erfurt	3 – 1	Eintracht Braunschweig	Steigerwaldstadion, Erfurt
14:00	Orlishausen; (yellow card) Malura; (yellow card) Bertram; Hillebrand; Stenzel; 88' Weidlich; (yellow card) Zedi; (yellow card) Pfingsten-Reddig; (yellow card) (substituted off) 88' Caillas; 40' 45' (substituted off) 89' Reichwein; (substituted off) 77' Semmer (substituted on) 77' Drexler; (substituted on) 88' Ströhl; (substituted on) 89' (yellow card) Lüttmann		Petković; Kessel (yellow card) (substituted off) 46'; Henn (substituted off) 79'; Doğan (yellow card); Reichel; Theuerkauf (yellow card); Bellarabi (yellow card); Pfitzner (substituted off) 70'; Kruppke 21'; Boland; Kumbela Fuchs (yellow card) (substituted on) 46'; Fetsch (substituted on) 70'; Bohl (substituted on) 79'	Attendance: 8,074; Referee: Florian Steuer (Menden)

20 March 2011	Eintracht Braunschweig	2 – 1	FC Hansa Rostock	Eintracht-Stadion, Braunschweig
13:15	Petković; Kessel; Henn; Doğan; Reichel; 37' Theuerkauf; (substituted off) 78' Bellarabi; Vrančić; 35' (substituted off) 86' Kruppke; Boland; (substituted off) 69' Kumbela (substituted on) 69' Calamita; (substituted on) 78' Fetsch; (substituted on) 86' Pfitzner		Hahnel; Schyrba (yellow card); Wiemann (yellow card); Trybull (substituted off) 62'; Pelzer; Pannewitz; Müller (yellow card); Ziegenbein; Lartey; Jänicke; Vujanovic (substituted off) 62' Schied (substituted on) 62' (goal) 85'; Albrecht (substituted on) 62'	Attendance: 23,000; Referee: Thorsten Kinhöfer (Herne)

2 April 2011	TuS Koblenz	0 – 2	Eintracht Braunschweig	Stadion Oberwerth, Koblenz
14:00	Paucken; Bender; Kittner; (substituted off) 71' Haben; (yellow card) Riemer; (substituted off) 71' Stahl; Brinkmann; (yellow card) Hornig; (yellow card) Hahn; (substituted off) 80' Steegmann; Rahn (substituted on) 71' Laux; (substituted on) 71' Hawel; (substituted on) 80' Bauer		Petković; Kessel; Henn; Doğan; Reichel; Theuerkauf; Bellarabi (substituted off) 69'; Vrančić (substituted off) 80'; Kruppke 65'; Boland (yellow card) (substituted off) 60'; Fetsch Kumbela (substituted on) 60' (goal) 64'; Reinhardt (substituted on) 69'; Bohl (substituted on) 80'	Attendance: 5,512; Referee: Karl Valentin (Taufkirchen)

6 April 2011	Eintracht Braunschweig	1 – 2	SV Werder Bremen II	Eintracht-Stadion, Braunschweig
19:00	Petković; Kessel; (yellow card) Henn; Doğan; Reichel; (yellow card) Theuerkauf; (substituted off) 55' Pfitzner; Vrančić; Kruppke; (substituted off) 67' Boland; 51' (pen.) (substituted off) 76' Kumbela (substituted on) 55' Fetsch; (substituted on) 67' Bohl; (substituted on) 76' (yellow card) Calamita		Vander (yellow card); Schiller; Stallbaum; Balogun (yellow card); Hessel; Ikeng (yellow card); Ronneburg; Schindler; Stevanovic (yellow card) (goal) 43' 90+1'; Kroos; Testroet Thy (substituted on) 66'; Nagel (substituted on) 76'; Thiele (substituted on) 87'	Attendance: 20,985; Referee: Christian Schößling (Leipzig)

10 April 2011	SpVgg Unterhaching	0 – 1	Eintracht Braunschweig	Generali Sportpark, Unterhaching
14:00	Kampa; Balkan; (substituted off) 9' Brysch; Hefele; (yellow card) Vitzthum; Mitterhuber; Jerat; (substituted off) 75' Yilmaz; Leandro; Amachaibou; (substituted off) 63' Tunjic (substituted on) 9' Hain; (substituted on) 63' Thee; (substituted on) 75' Avdic		Petković; Kessel (yellow card) (substituted off) 75'; Henn; Doğan; Reichel; Theuerkauf; Bellarabi 6'; Vrančić (substituted off) 63'; Kruppke; Reinhardt (substituted off) 89'; Kumbela Bohl (substituted on) 63'; Washausen (substituted on) 75'; Fuchs (substituted on) 89'	Attendance: 3,100; Referee: Thomas Metzen (Mechernich)

15 April 2011	Eintracht Braunschweig	1 – 1	SV Babelsberg 03	Eintracht-Stadion, Braunschweig
19:00	Petković; Fuchs; Henn; Doğan; Reichel; 42' Theuerkauf; Bellarabi; Vrančić; (substituted off) 81' Kruppke; (substituted off) 77' Boland; (substituted off) 88' Kumbela (substituted on) 77' Reinhardt; (substituted on) 81' Pfitzner; (substituted on) 88' Fetsch		Unger; Jovanovic; Schütz; Oumari; Rudolph; Müller; Civa (substituted off) 63'; Koc (substituted off) 46'; Stroh-Engel; Makarenko; Hebisch 69' Koçer (substituted on) 46'; Prochnow (substituted on) 63'	Attendance: 22,120; Referee: Benjamin Cortus (Nürnberg)

19 April 2011	SV Wacker Burghausen	0 – 0	Eintracht Braunschweig	Wacker Arena, Burghausen
19:00	Vollath; Holz; Omodiagbe; (substituted off) 81' Eberlein; Halfar; Leberfinger; (substituted off) 90' Grübl; Burkhard; Holzer; (substituted off) 73' Brucia; Agyemang (substituted on) 73' Knappmann; (substituted on) 81' Wolf; (substituted on) 73' Behr		Davari; Kessel; Henn; Doğan; Reichel; Theuerkauf; Reinhardt; Kruppke; Unger (substituted off) 73'; Bellarabi (substituted off) 46'; Kumbela (substituted off) 73' Boland; Fetsch; Vrančić	Attendance: 2,840; Referee: Martin Petersen (Leinfelden-Echterdingen)

23 April 2011	Eintracht Braunschweig	2 – 1	Kickers Offenbach	Eintracht-Stadion, Braunschweig
14:00	Petković; Kessel; Henn; Doğan; Reichel; 47' Bellarabi; Vrančić; Theuerkauf; (substituted off) 84' Boland; 19' (substituted off) 89' Kumbela; (substituted off) 88' Fetsch (substituted on) 84' Fuchs; (substituted on) 88' Bohl; (substituted on) 89' Washausen		Wulnikowski; Stadel (yellow card) (substituted off) 59'; Husterer (yellow card); Kopilas; Teixeira (yellow card); Huber; Mehic; Feldhahn 69'; Laux (yellow card); Rathgeber (substituted off) 46'; Hesse (substituted off) 20' Gunkel (substituted on) 20'; Vunguidica (substituted on) 46'; Haas (substituted on) 59'	Attendance: 21,225; Referee: Daniel Siebert (Berlin)

30 April 2011	Eintracht Braunschweig	2 – 1	VfB Stuttgart II	Eintracht-Stadion, Braunschweig
14:00	Davari; 63' Kessel; (yellow card) Turan; (substituted off) 16' Doğan; Reichel; Theuerkauf; (substituted off) 80' Bellarabi; Fetsch; Vrančić; (yellow card) Boland; (substituted off) 70' Kumbela (substituted on) 16' Henn; (substituted on) 70' (goal) 90+2' Calamita; (substituted on) 80' Fuchs		Leno; Vecchione (red card) 72'; Geyer; Vier; Hertner; Holzhauser 54'; Rathgeb; Gardawski (substituted off) 90'; Riemann (substituted off) 82'; Rühle (substituted off) 74'; Benyamina (substituted on) 74' Müller; (substituted on) 82' Broghammer; (substituted on) 90' Röcker	Attendance: 18,330; Referee: Martin Thomsen (Kleve)

7 May 2011	FC Carl Zeiss Jena	2 – 2	Eintracht Braunschweig	Ernst-Abbe-Sportfeld, Jena
13:30	Siefkes; Pichinot; Eismann; (yellow card) Voigt; Landeka; Eckardt; Schmidt; (substituted off) 53' Öztürk; 39' (substituted off) 67' Hähnge; (substituted off) 74' Fries; 20' (yellow card) Smeekes (substituted on) 53' Ullmann; (substituted on) 67' Nikol; (substituted on) 74' Nagy		Davari; Washausen; Henn; Turan; Reichel (yellow card); Theuerkauf; Reinhardt (substituted off) 86'; Amrhein (substituted off) 60'; Vrančić 27'; Boland; Kumbela 17' (substituted off) 82' Calamita (substituted on) 60'; Fetsch (substituted on) 82'; Unger (substituted on) 86'	Attendance: 7,549; Referee: Malte Dittrich (Bremen)

14 May 2011	Eintracht Braunschweig	4 – 0	1. FC Heidenheim	Eintracht-Stadion, Braunschweig
13:30	Petković; Washausen; Henn; Kessel; (substituted off) 76' Fuchs; 44' 54' Theuerkauf; Reinhardt; (substituted off) 85' Boland; (substituted off) 72' Kruppke; 28' Vrančić; 11' Kumbela (substituted on) 72' Pfitzner; (substituted on) 76' Fetsch; (substituted on) 85' Calamita		Sabanov; Sirigu; Göhlert; Aupperle; Feistle (yellow card); Schittenhelm; Klarer (substituted off) 56'; Essig (yellow card); Sauter; Schnatterer; Spann (yellow card) Meier (substituted on) 56' (yellow card)	Attendance: 22,100; Referee: Christian Dietz (Kronach)

== DFB-Pokal ==
=== 1st round ===
Win Tie Loss

14 August 2010	Eintracht Braunschweig	1 – 2 a.e.t.	SpVgg Greuther Fürth	Eintracht-Stadion, Braunschweig
19:30	Petković; Fuchs; (yellow card) Henn; Doğan; Reichel; (yellow card) Bellarabi; (substituted off) 100' Pfitzner; Vrančić; (substituted off) 83' (yellow card) Boland; (yellow card) Kruppke; Kumbela (substituted on) 83' Reinhardt; (substituted on) 100' (goal) 106' Fetsch		Grün; Schröck (yellow card); Kleine (yellow card); Biliskov; Rahn (yellow card); Pekovic (yellow card) (substituted off) 88'; Nehrig 91' (substituted off) 120'; Haas 119'; Müller; Onuegbu (substituted off) 86'; Schahin (yellow card) Nöthe (yellow card) (substituted on) 86'; Karaslavov (substituted on) 88'; Mauersberger (substituted on) 120'	Attendance: 16,935; Referee: Christian Fischer (Hemer)

== Krombacher-Pokal ==
=== Round of 16 ===
Win Tie Loss

17 August 2010	SV Arminia Hannover	1 – 4	Eintracht Braunschweig	Rudolf-Kalweit-Stadion, Hannover
18:30	Knust; Buchholz; Folprecht; Bayramoglu; Jansen; Ibanez; Zydek; Preuß; 55' (pen.) Janke; Ibekwe; Alexoudis (substituted on) 20' Strunkey; (substituted on) 46' Kattenhorn; (substituted on) 74' Ortega		Davari; Theuerkauf; Kessel; Washausen; Reinhardt; Kragl (substituted off) 80'; Amrhein (substituted off) 60'; Unger; Lemke (substituted off) 60'; Calamita 9' (pen.); Fetsch Boland 70' 79' (substituted on) 60'; Bellarabi 76' (substituted on) 60'; Tozlu (substituted on) 80'	Attendance: 800; Referee: Stephan Müller (Algermissen)

=== Quarter-final ===
8 September 2010	TSV Havelse	0 – 3	Eintracht Braunschweig	Wilhelm-Langrehr-Stadion, Garbsen
19:00	Lucassen; Strunkey; (substituted off) 79' Holm; Smidt; Habryka; Wetter; Beismann; Werner; Tayar; (substituted off) 63' Zimmermann; Posipal (substituted on) 63' Kaya; (substituted on) 79' Brüntjen		Davari; Reichel; Doğan; Henn; Fuchs; Bellarabi (substituted off) 66'; Pfitzner; Boland; Reinhardt 83'; Kruppke (substituted off) 87'; Kumbela 75' (substituted off) 89' Vrančić (substituted on) 66'; Calamita (substituted on) 87'; Lemke 90' (substituted on) 89'	Attendance: 756; Referee: André Wenzel (Gnarrenburg)

=== Semi-final ===
29 September 2010	TSV Ottersberg	0 – 4	Eintracht Braunschweig	Wümme-Sportplatz, Ottersberg
17:00	Eggert; Rodrigues; Peek; Koltonowski; Aktas; Behrens; Neumann; (substituted off) 73' Wahlers; Peter; Nowotny; (substituted off) 73' Becker (substituted on) 73' Denker; (substituted on) 73' Mutlu; (substituted on) 77' Saghey-Bi-Ria		Davari; Theuerkauf; Doğan; Henn; Kessel; Pfitzner (substituted off) 71'; Boland 69'; Reinhardt (substituted off) 62'; Amrhein; Kumbela 2' (substituted off) 46'; Fetsch Kruppke (substituted on) 46'; Bellarabi 64' (substituted on) 62'; Lemke 90' (substituted on) 71'	Attendance: 852; Referee: Dirk Wijnen (Hannover)

=== Final ===
3 May 2011	Kickers Emden	1 – 2	Eintracht Braunschweig	Embdena-Stadion, Emden
19:00	Gerdes; Grotlüschen; Meyer; (yellow card) Nennhuber; Menzel; (yellow card) Boekhoff; 87' Thomes; Müller; Kulbatzki; Bennert; Gerdes-Wurpts (substituted on) 62' Friauf; (substituted on) 72' Janßen; (substituted on) 72' Djokovic		Davari; Çelikyurt (yellow card); Turan; Kessel; Washausen; Reinhardt; Fuchs (substituted off) 35'; Amrhein; Unger; Lemke; Calamita 59' 68' Fetsch (substituted on) 35'	Attendance: 674; Referee: Marcus Henze

== Friendlies ==
Win Tie Loss

19 June 2010	MTV Wolfenbüttel	0 – 5	Eintracht Braunschweig	Meesche-Stadion, Wolfenbüttel
15:00			Reichel 20'; Kruppke 38'; Doğan 45'; Pfitzner 57'; Vrančić 88'	Attendance: 400

20 June 2010	VfB Rot-Weiß 04 Braunschweig	0 – 5	Eintracht Braunschweig	Georg-Weber-Stadion, Braunschweig
15:30			Kessel 43'; Pfitzner 48'; Kruppke 58'; Unger 85'; Vrančić 88'	Attendance: 500

26 June 2010	SV Grün-Weiß Vallstedt	0 – 3	Eintracht Braunschweig	Sportplatz an der Alvesser Straße, Vallstedt
14:00			Calamita 37' 56'; Unger 49'	Attendance: 800

1 July 2010	Goslarer SC 08	1 – 3	Eintracht Braunschweig	S-Arena, Goslar
18:00	Karabulut 15'		Kruppke 19' 45' (pen.); Gos 70'	Attendance: 1,200

9 July 2010	Eintracht Braunschweig	2 – 1	FC Schalke 04	Eintracht-Stadion, Braunschweig
18:00	Kumbela 10'; Kragl 81'		Gavranovic 64'	Attendance: 13,000

11 July 2010	Freie Turner Braunschweig	0 – 2	Eintracht Braunschweig	Prinzenpark-Stadion, Braunschweig
14:30			Unger 71'; Calamita 89'	Attendance: 400

17 July 2010	Flota Świnoujście (Poland)	1 – 2	Eintracht Braunschweig	Stadion am Salzgittersee, Salzgitter-Lebenstedt
14:00	Ciarkowski 45' (pen.)		Boland 3' 42'	Attendance: 1,500

20 July 2010	TSV Dungelbeck	0 – 7	Eintracht Braunschweig	Sportplatz Dungelbeck, Dungelbeck
19:00			Tozlu 9'; Kragl 12'; Fetsch 65'; Amrhein 74' 89'; Calamita 87' 90+2' (pen.)	Attendance: 300

31 August 2010	SV Bavenstedt	1 – 2	Eintracht Braunschweig	Brunnenkopp-Sportpark, Bavenstedt
18:30	Pietsch 86'		Fetsch	Attendance: 300

9 October 2010	SC Paderborn 07	2 – 1	Eintracht Braunschweig	Sportanlage Am Klosterholz, Teistungen
14:00	Strohdiek 47'; Mosquera 76'		Kruppke 13'

13 January 2011	Eintracht Braunschweig	1 – 1	(Switzerland) FC Zürich	Stade Olympique de Sousse, Sousse
15:00	Kumbela 22'		Koch 66'	Attendance: 100

25 March 2011	Hertha BSC Berlin	0 – 0	Eintracht Braunschweig	Olympiapark Amateurstadion, Berlin
14:30				Attendance: in private

== Players ==
Squad Season 2010–11
No.	Player	Nat.	Birthday	at BTSV since	previous club	League matches	League goals	Cup matches	Cup goals
Goalkeepers
22	Marjan Petković	German	22 May 1979	2009	FSV Frankfurt	35	0	1	0
26	Daniel Davari	German	6 Jan 1988	2009	FSV Mainz 05 II	4	0	4	0
Defenders
4	Matthias Henn	German	28 Apr 1985	2007	1. FC Kaiserslautern	37	1	3	0
5	Benjamin Kessel	German	1 Oct 1987	2010	FSV Mainz 05 II	24	1	3	0
7	Benjamin Fuchs	Austrian	20 Oct 1983	2007	SV Wehen Wiesbaden	26	1	3	0
8	Deniz Doğan	Turk	20 Oct 1979	2007	VfB Lübeck	34	4	3	0
13	Süleyman Çelikyurt	German	27 Jul 1989	2010	Youth system	0	0	1	0
14	Jan Washausen	German	2 Oct 1988	2007	Youth system	5	0	2	0
16	Emre Turan	Turk	16 Nov 1990	01/11	Ankaraspor	2	0	1	0
19	Ken Reichel	German	19 Dec 1986	2007	Hamburger SV II	35	1	2	0
24	Pascal Gos	German	15 Aug 1991	2010	Youth system	0	0	0	0
Midfielders
6	Damir Vrančić	Bosnian	4 Oct 1985	2009	Borussia Dortmund II	30	6	2	0
10	Mirko Boland	German	23 Apr 1987	01/09	MSV Duisburg II	37	3	4	3
11	Steffen Bohl	German	28 Dec 1983	01/11	SV Wehen Wiesbaden	8	1	0	0
15	Norman Theuerkauf	German	24 Jan 1987	2009	Eintracht Frankfurt II	31	5	2	0
17	Markus Unger	German	18 Nov 1981	2010	Hessen Kassel	12	1	2	0
20	Dennis Lemke	German	8 Mar 1989	2010	Hertha BSC II	1	0	4	2
21	Patrick Amrhein	German	20 Oct 1989	2010	FC Carl Zeiss Jena	11	1	3	0
23	Julius Reinhardt	German	29 Mar 1988	2010	Chemnitzer FC	16	2	5	1
25	Mehmet-Ali Tozlu	German	18 Aug 1990	2010	Youth system	0	0	1	0
27	Oliver Kragl	German	12 May 1990	2009	VfL Wolfsburg Youth	1	0	1	0
31	Marc Pfitzner	German	28 Aug 1984	2007	Youth system	23	2	3	0
Strikers
9	Mathias Fetsch	German	30 Sep 1988	2010	TSV München 1860 II	30	5	4	1
12	Dominick Kumbela	Congolese	20 Apr 1984	01/10	Rot Weiss Ahlen	38	19	3	2
18	Marco Calamita	Italian	22 Mar 1983	2009	SV Wacker Burghausen	19	3	3	3
32	Dennis Kruppke (captain)	German	1 Apr 1980	01/08	SC Freiburg	34	16	3	0
38	Karim Bellarabi	German	8 Apr 1990	01/10	Youth system	35	8	4	2
Last updated: 14 May 2011

=== Transfers ===
In:

No.	Pos.	Nation	Player
21	MF	GER	Patrick Amrhein (from FC Carl Zeiss Jena)
9	FW	GER	Mathias Fetsch (from TSV München 1860)
24	DF	GER	Pascal Gos (from Youth team)
5	DF	GER	Benjamin Kessel (from 1. FSV Mainz 05 II)
20	MF	GER	Dennis Lemke (from Hertha BSC II)
23	MF	GER	Julius Reinhardt (from Chemnitzer FC)
25	MF	GER	Mehmet-Ali Tozlu (from Youth team)
17	MF	GER	Markus Unger (from Hessen Kassel)
16	DF	TUR	Emre Turan (from Ankaraspor)
11	MF	GER	Steffen Bohl (from SV Wehen Wiesbaden)

Out:

No.	Pos.	Nation	Player
25	FW	GER	Fait-Florian Banser (to 1. FC Kaiserslautern II)
2	DF	GER	Dennis Brinkmann (to TuS Koblenz)
13	MF	GER	Tim Danneberg (to SV Sandhausen)
17	MF	FRA	Smail Morabit (to CS Fola Esch)
20	FW	NGR	Kingsley Onuegbu (to SpVgg Greuther Fürth)
5	DF	GER	Jan Schanda (to VfB Fallersleben)
25	MF	GER	Mehmet-Ali Tozlu (to Reserve team)
11	FW	GER	Marc Vucinovic (to Reserve team)
23	MF	TUR	Fatih Yılmaz

== Management and coaching staff ==
Since 12 May 2008 Torsten Lieberknecht is the manager of Eintracht Braunschweig.

Position	Staff
Manager	Torsten Lieberknecht
Assistant manager	Darius Scholtysik
Assistant manager	Jürgen Rische
Goalkeeping coach	Alexander Kunze
Sporting director	Marc Arnold
Club doctor	Dr. Frank Maier
Physiotherapist	Sascha Weiß
Kit and equipment manager/Bus driver	Christian Skolik
