= Klarer =

Klarer is a surname. Notable people with the surname include:

- Christoph Klarer (born 2000), Austrian footballer
- Elizabeth Klarer (1910–1994), South African claimed alien abductee and author
- Martin Klarer (born 1982), German footballer
