= Hahnel =

Hahnel or Hähnel is a German surname. Notable people with the surname include:

- Ernst Julius Hähnel (1811–1891), German sculptor
- Jörg Hahnel (born 1982), German footballer
- Paul Hahnel (1843–1887), German entomologist
- Robin Hahnel (born 1946), American economist and academic
