= Olumide =

Nigerian name

- Gender: Male
- Language: Yoruba

Origin
- Origin: Nigeria
- Region of origin: South Western Nigeria

Other names
- Related names: Ayomide

Olumide is both a masculine given name and surname. It may refer to: It has the meaning "My lord has come or My hero has come."

== Given name ==
- Olumide Durojaiye (born 1992), Nigerian footballer
- Olumide Olamigoke (born 1990), Nigerian triple jumper
- Olumide Oyedeji (born 1981), Nigerian-British basketball player
- Stephen Olumide Arigbabu (born 1972), German basketball player
- Olumide Oworu Nigerian actor and model

== Surname ==
- Folabi Olumide, Nigerian academic and surgeon
- Eunice Olumide (born 1987), Scottish model
- Joseph Olumide (born 1987), Nigerian footballer
- Oresegun Olumide, Nigerian artist
