= Haben =

Haben is a surname. Notable people with the surname include:

== Surnames ==
- Andrew Haben (1834–1908), Prussian-born businessman and politician
- Ralph Haben (born 1941), American politician
- Stefan Haben (born 1987), German football player
- Jennifer Haben (born 1995), German singer

== See also ==
- Haben Girma (born 1988), deafblind lawyer
