= Markus Fuchs =

Markus Fuchs may refer to:

- Markus Fuchs (equestrian) (born 1955), Swiss show jumper
- Markus Fuchs (footballer) (born 1980), German footballer
- Markus Fuchs (sprinter) (born 1995), Austrian sprinter
