= Daniel Bernhardt (disambiguation) =

Daniel Bernhardt (born 1965), is a Swiss actor.

Daniel Bernhardt also refer to:

- Daniel Bernhardt (footballer) (born 1985), German footballer
- Daniel Bernhardt (ice hockey) (born 1996), Swedish ice hockey player
