= Sebastian Fries =

German footballer

Personal information
- Date of birth: January 24, 1993 (age 33)
- Place of birth: Karlstadt, Germany
- Position: Forward

Team information
- Current team: TSV Karlfeld
- Number: 24

Youth career
- TSV Wiesenfeld
- –2008: Viktoria Aschaffenburg
- 2008–2011: Carl Zeiss Jena

Senior career*
Years	Team	Apps	(Gls)
2011–2014	Carl Zeiss Jena	64	(3)
2011–2014	Carl Zeiss Jena II	26	(5)
2014–2015	Würzburger Kickers	2	(0)
2014–2017	Würzburger Kickers II	80	(36)
2017–2019	Würzburger FV	68	(19)
2019–	TSV Karlburg	23	(3)

Managerial career
- 2019–: TSV Karlburg (player-assistant)
- * Club domestic league appearances and goals as of 25 January 2021

Sebastian Fries (born January 24, 1993) is a German footballer who plays as a forward for TSV Karlburg.

== Career ==
Fries came through Carl Zeiss Jena's youth system and made his debut in April 2011, as a substitute for Orlando Smeekes in a 3. Liga match against Kickers Offenbach. He signed for Kickers Würzburg in July 2014.
