= Sandro Stallbaum =

German footballer

Personal information
- Date of birth: 14 September 1981 (age 45)
- Place of birth: Anklam, East Germany
- Height: 1.83 m (6 ft 0 in)
- Position: Defender

Youth career
- 1987–1991: Vorwärts Neubrandenburg
- 1991–2002: FC Tollense Neubrandenburg

Senior career*
Years	Team	Apps	(Gls)
2002–2003	TSG Neustrelitz	36	(1)
2003–2013	Werder Bremen II	300	(5)
Total		336	(6)
- * Club domestic league appearances and goals

Sandro Stallbaum (born 14 September 1981) is a German former professional footballer who last played as a defender for Werder Bremen II. Stallbaum started his career as a midfielder but primarily featured as a defender.

Following the 2012–13 season, Stallbaum announced his retirement from professional football.
