= Michał Ciarkowski =

Polish footballer

Personal information
- Date of birth: 5 July 1989 (age 37)
- Place of birth: Poznań, Poland
- Height: 1.82 m (5 ft 11 1/2 in)
- Position: Winger

Team information
- Current team: Lechia Dzierżoniów (assistant)

Youth career
- UKS Winiary 27 Poznań
- Lech Poznań
- 2004: Hobby Swarzędz
- 2004–2007: Dyskobolia Grodzisk

Senior career*
Years	Team	Apps	(Gls)
2007–2008	Dyskobolia Grodzisk	2	(0)
2008–2011	Polonia Warsaw	2	(0)
2009–2010	→ Flota Świnoujście (loan)	29	(5)
2011–2012	Warta Poznań	15	(2)
2012–2013	Motor Lublin	27	(2)
2013–2017	Warta Poznań	124	(36)
2017	GKS Bełchatów	17	(0)
2018	Gryf Wejherowo	12	(3)
2018–2020	Kotwica Kołobrzeg	41	(6)
2020–2021	Unia Janikowo	10	(0)
2021	Sokół Kleczew	16	(3)
2021–2025	Lechia Dzierżoniów	89	(41)
Total		384	(98)

International career
	Poland U17	4	(1)
	Poland U19	8	(1)
- * Club domestic league appearances and goals

Michał Ciarkowski (born 5 July 1989) is a Polish former professional footballer who played as a winger. He is currently the assistant coach of IV liga Lower Silesia club Lechia Dzierżoniów.

== Honours ==
Dyskobolia Grodzisk Wlkp.

- Ekstraklasa Cup: 2007–08

Warta Poznań

- III liga Kuyavia-Pomerania–Greater Poland: 2014–15, 2015–16

Lechia Dzierżoniów

- IV liga Lower Silesia East: 2021–22
- Polish Cup (Lower Silesia regionals): 2021–22
- Polish Cup (Wałbrzych regionals): 2021–22
