= Marian Unger =

German footballer

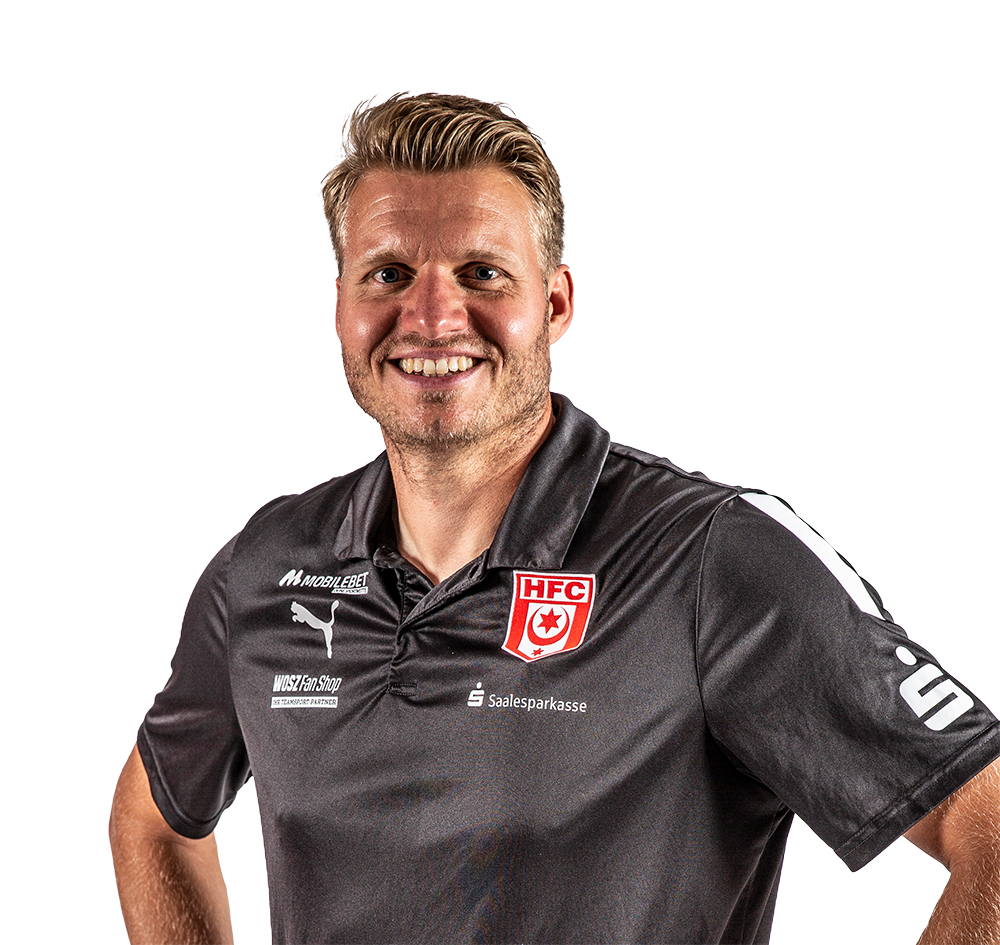
- Unger in 2022

Personal information
- Date of birth: 17 November 1983 (age 42)
- Place of birth: Markranstädt, East Germany
- Height: 1.87 m (6 ft 2 in)

Youth career
- –2000: Berliner FC Dynamo
- 2000–2002: Carl Zeiss Jena

Senior career*
Years	Team	Apps	(Gls)
2001–2004	Carl Zeiss Jena II	26	(0)
2002–2004	Carl Zeiss Jena	0	(0)
2004–2006	MSV Neuruppin	52	(0)
2006–2007	VfL Osnabrück	0	(0)
2007–2008	1. FC Magdeburg	4	(0)
2008–2012	SV Babelsberg 03	120	(0)
2012–2017	FSV Zwickau	121	(0)
2017–2018	VFC Plauen	14	(0)
2018	FC Thüringen Weida	13	(0)
Total		350	(0)

Managerial career
- 2018–: Hallescher FC (goalkeeping coach)
- * Club domestic league appearances and goals

Marian Unger (born 17 November 1983) is a German former professional footballer who played as a goalkeeper.
