= André Maczkowiak =

German footballer

Personal information
- Date of birth: 1 April 1983 (age 43)
- Place of birth: Leverkusen, West Germany
- Height: 1.92 m (6 ft 4 in)
- Position: Goalkeeper

Youth career
- 1989–: 1. FC Monheim
- KFC Uerdingen
- –2002: Bayer Leverkusen

Senior career*
Years	Team	Apps	(Gls)
2002–2005	1. FC Köln II	27	(0)
2005–2007	Rot-Weiss Essen	28	(0)
2007–2008	Rot-Weiß Erfurt	22	(0)
2008–2010	Rot-Weiss Essen	51	(0)
2009	Rot-Weiss Essen II	1	(0)
2010–2011	Rot Weiss Ahlen	19	(0)
2011–2012	Sportfreunde Lotte	2	(0)
2012–2017	1. FC Monheim		
- * Club domestic league appearances and goals

André Maczkowiak (born 1 April 1983) is a German former footballer who played as a goalkeeper.
