= Alexander Eberlein =

German footballer (born 1988)

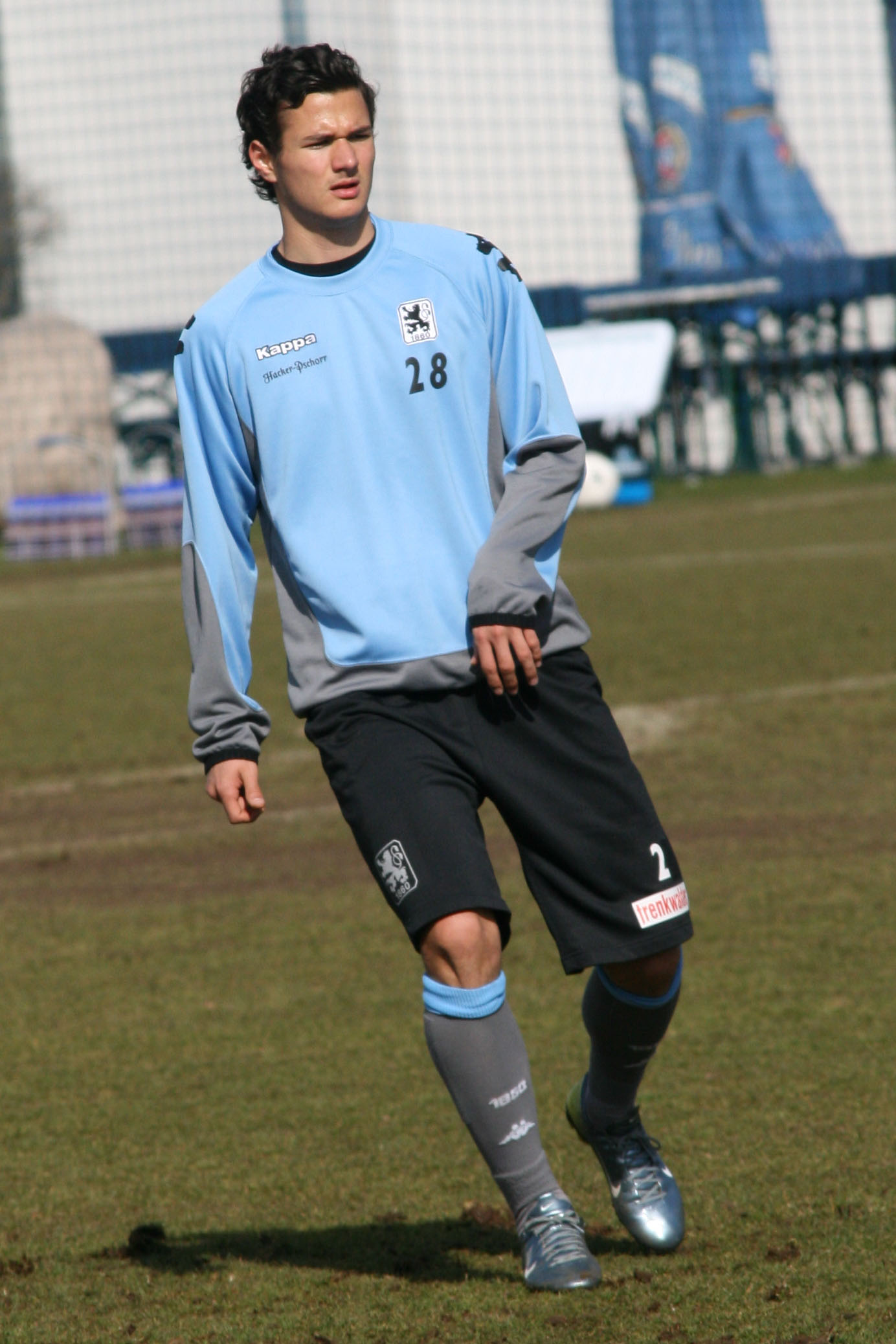
- Eberlein training with 1860 Munich in 2007

Personal information
- Date of birth: 14 January 1988 (age 38)
- Place of birth: Fürth, West Germany
- Position: Centre-back

Youth career
- 1994–1997: SF Großgründlach
- 1997–2003: Greuther Fürth
- 2003–2005: 1860 Munich

Senior career*
Years	Team	Apps	(Gls)
2005–2009	1860 Munich II	57	(2)
2006–2009	1860 Munich	9	(0)
2009–2010	SV Sandhausen	46	(2)
2010–2014	Wacker Burghausen	118	(11)
Total		230	(15)
- * Club domestic league appearances and goals

Alexander Eberlein (born 14 January 1988) is a German former professional footballer who played as a centre-back. He played in the 2. Bundesliga for 1860 Munich.

== Career ==
Eberlein played for 1860 Munich, 1860 Munich II, SV Sandhausen and Wacker Burghausen. He retired from playing in 2014.
