= Oliver Laux =

German footballer

Personal information
- Date of birth: March 26, 1990 (age 36)
- Place of birth: Lahnstein, Germany
- Height: 1.85 m (6 ft 1 in)
- Position: Center back

Youth career
- FC Horchheim
- –2005: FV Engers
- 2005–2009: TuS Koblenz

Senior career*
Years	Team	Apps	(Gls)
2009–2011	TuS Koblenz	29	(0)
2011–2015	SC Fortuna Köln	93	(6)
2015	TuS Koblenz	10	(0)
2015–2016	Eintracht Trier 05	24	(2)
2016–2018	Teutonia Watzenborn	22	(1)
2018–2020	FC Gießen	1	(0)
- * Club domestic league appearances and goals

Oliver Laux (born March 26, 1990) is a German former footballer.
