= Christian Pospischil =

German footballer

Personal information
- Date of birth: 14 May 1985 (age 41)
- Place of birth: Offenbach am Main, Germany
- Height: 1.88 m (6 ft 2 in)
- Position: Midfielder

Youth career
- Kickers Offenbach
- Kickers Obertshausen
- –2004: Borussia Mönchengladbach

Senior career*
| Years | Team | Apps | (Gls) |
| 2004–2005 | Borussia Mönchengladbach II | 6 | (0) |
| 2005–2007 | Kickers Offenbach | 30 | (1) |
| 2007–2008 | Sportfreunde Siegen | 20 | (0) |
| 2008–2010 | Kickers Offenbach | 48 | (5) |
| 2010–2011 | TuS Koblenz | 20 | (1) |
| 2012–2013 | Fortuna Köln | 51 | (7) |
| 2014 | SSV Lindheim | | |
| 2014–2016 | Hessen Dreieich | 29 | (3) |
| 2016–2018 | Rot-Weiss Frankfurt | 50 | (5) |
- * Club domestic league appearances and goals

Christian Pospischil (born 14 May 1985) is a German former footballer who played as a midfielder.
