= Thomas Ströhl =

German footballer

Personal information
- Date of birth: 10 October 1988 (age 38)
- Place of birth: Erfurt, East Germany
- Height: 1.84 m (6 ft 0 in)
- Position: Left-back

Youth career
- FSV 1921 Herbsleben
- –2008: Rot-Weiss Erfurt

Senior career*
Years	Team	Apps	(Gls)
2008–2013	Rot-Weiss Erfurt	93	(3)
2013–2014	Goslarer SC	21	(0)
2014–2015	Carl Zeiss Jena	14	(1)
2015–2016	Germania Halberstadt	24	(0)
2016–2019	Hildesheim	56	(0)
2019–2023	Lupo Martini Wolfsburg		
- * Club domestic league appearances and goals

Thomas Ströhl (born 10 October 1988) is a German former footballer who played as a left-back.

== Career ==
Ströhl began his career with Rot-Weiß Erfurt and made his debut for the club in May 2008, as a substitute for Alexander Schnetzler in a 1–1 draw with VfB Lübeck and over the next five years made over 90 appearances in the 3. Liga. He signed for Goslarer SC in 2013 and Carl Zeiss Jena a year later.
