= Maik Schutzbach =

German footballer

Personal information
- Date of birth: May 31, 1986 (age 40)
- Place of birth: Tuttlingen, West Germany
- Height: 1.69 m (5 ft 7 in)
- Position: Midfielder

Youth career
- –1999: VfL Mühlheim
- 1999–2001: SV Spaichingen
- 2001–2005: SC Freiburg

Senior career*
Years	Team	Apps	(Gls)
2005–2008	SC Freiburg II	82	(6)
2006–2008	SC Freiburg	0	(0)
2008–2010	Kickers Offenbach	31	(1)
2010–2011	1. FC Saarbrücken	10	(1)
Total		123	(9)

Managerial career
- 2019–2020: VfL Mühlheim
- * Club domestic league appearances and goals

Maik Schutzbach (born May 31, 1986 in Tuttlingen, Baden-Württemberg) is a German former professional footballer who played as a midfielder.
