= Alexander Buch =

German footballer

Personal information
- Date of birth: 12 May 1988 (age 38)
- Place of birth: Munich, West Germany
- Height: 1.74 m (5 ft 9 in)
- Position: Midfielder

Team information
- Current team: TSV Grünwald

Youth career
- –2007: FC Bayern Munich

Senior career*
Years	Team	Apps	(Gls)
2007–2010	FC Ingolstadt 04 II	19	(3)
2007–2010	FC Ingolstadt 04	19	(1)
2010–2011	Jahn Regensburg	14	(1)
2011–2012	SpVgg Unterhaching II	12	(0)
2011–2012	SpVgg Unterhaching	2	(0)
2012–2013	FC Ismaning	18	(0)
2013	SV Elversberg II	2	(0)
2013–2014	SV Elversberg	27	(1)
2014–2017	FC Ismaning	58	(2)
2017–2018	TSV Dachau	14	(0)
2020–	TSV Grünwald	0	(0)
- * Club domestic league appearances and goals as of 1 January 2020

Alexander Buch (born 12 May 1988 in Munich) is a German footballer who currently plays for TSV Grünwald. He made his debut on the professional league level in the 2. Bundesliga with FC Ingolstadt 04 on 20 February 2009 when he came on as a substitute for Valdet Rama in the 68th minute in a game against Alemannia Aachen.
