= Christian Brucia =

German footballer

Personal information
- Date of birth: 2 February 1988 (age 38)
- Place of birth: Offenbach, West Germany
- Position: Right midfielder

Team information
- Current team: TSV Buchbach
- Number: 17

Youth career
- –2007: Eintracht Frankfurt

Senior career*
Years	Team	Apps	(Gls)
2007–2009	Eintracht Frankfurt II	35	(1)
2009–2012	Wacker Burghausen	75	(3)
2013	SV Waldhof Mannheim	12	(0)
2013–	TSV Buchbach	249	(21)
- * Club domestic league appearances and goals as of 1 May 2024

Christian Brucia (born 2 February 1988) is a German footballer who plays for TSV Buchbach.
