= Marcel Busch =

German footballer

Personal information
- Date of birth: 2 February 1982 (age 44)
- Place of birth: Heilbronn, West Germany
- Height: 1.78 m (5 ft 10 in)
- Position: Defender

Team information
- Current team: SpVgg Neckarelz
- Number: 14

Youth career
- –1996: TSV Untereisesheim
- 1996–2001: VfR Heilbronn

Senior career*
Years	Team	Apps	(Gls)
2001–2002	VfR Heilbronn		
2002–2005	VfR Aalen	89	(7)
2005–2007	SC Pfullendorf	67	(3)
2007–2011	Rot Weiss Ahlen	128	(9)
2011–2013	SV Sandhausen	13	(1)
2013–	SpVgg Neckarelz	60	(3)
- * Club domestic league appearances and goals as of 14 June 2015

Marcel Busch (born 2 February 1982 in Heilbronn) is a German footballer who currently plays for SpVgg Neckarelz.
