= Stephan Sieger =

German footballer

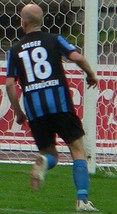
- Stephan Sieger

Personal information
- Date of birth: 3 December 1979 (age 46)
- Place of birth: Bruchsal, West Germany
- Height: 1.84 m (6 ft 0 in)
- Position: Midfielder

Team information
- Current team: FC Astoria Walldorf

Youth career
- SV Eichelberg
- FV Elsenz
- SG Östringen-Odenheim
- –1998: VfR Heilbronn
- 1998–1999: SV Sinsheim

Senior career*
Years	Team	Apps	(Gls)
1999–2001	FC Astoria Walldorf		
2001–2004	TSG 1899 Hoffenheim	90	(13)
2004–2008	Kickers Offenbach	123	(13)
2008–2010	Fortuna Düsseldorf	48	(1)
2010–2012	1. FC Saarbrücken	72	(11)
2012–	FC Astoria Walldorf	0	(0)
- * Club domestic league appearances and goals as of 27 June 2012

Stephan Sieger (born 3 December 1979) is a German footballer currently playing for FC Astoria Walldorf.
