= Dieter Paucken =

German footballer

- Paucken with TuS Koblenz

Personal information
- Date of birth: 20 September 1982 (age 44)
- Place of birth: Koblenz, West Germany
- Height: 1.93 m (6 ft 4 in)
- Position: Goalkeeper

Youth career
- Mainz 05
- TuS Koblenz
- –2001: TuS Neuendorf

Senior career*
Years	Team	Apps	(Gls)
2001–2005	FV Engers 07	74	(0)
2005–2008	1. FC Köln II	18	(1)
2009	SV Roßbach/Verscheid		
2009–2011	TuS Koblenz	43	(0)
2011–2012	Fortuna Köln	30	(0)
2012–2013	TuS Koblenz	45	(0)
2013–2017	FV Engers 07	79	(1)
2017–2021	TuS Koblenz	77	(0)

Managerial career
- 2015–2017: FV Engers 07 (goalkeeping coach)
- * Club domestic league appearances and goals

Dieter Paucken (born 20 September 1982) is a German former professional footballer who played as a goalkeeper. In September 2006 he scored the ARD's Goal of the Month.
