= Nico Weißmann =

German footballer

Personal information
- Date of birth: 14 April 1980 (age 46)
- Place of birth: Saarbrücken, West Germany
- Position: Attacking midfielder

Senior career*
Years	Team	Apps	(Gls)
1999–2001	1. FC Saarbrücken II		
2001–2003	SV Wehen	12	(0)
2003–2005	1. FC Saarbrücken II	44	(9)
2003–2005	1. FC Saarbrücken	1	(0)
2005–2007	FK Pirmasens	57	(14)
2007–2008	1. FC Kaiserslautern II	19	(2)
2008–2011	1. FC Saarbrücken	67	(16)
2011	FC Homburg	10	(0)
2011–2012	Borussia Neunkirchen	15	(1)
Total		225	(42)
- * Club domestic league appearances and goals

Nico Weißmann (born 14 April 1980) is a German former professional footballer who played as an attacking midfielder. During his career, he represented FC Homburg, 1. FC Saarbrücken, SV Wehen, FK Pirmasens, 1. FC Kaiserslautern II and Borussia Neunkirchen.

== Honours ==
- Oberliga Südwest (V): 2009
- Regionalliga West (IV): 2010
