= Marcus Hoffmann =

German footballer (born 1987)

Personal information
- Date of birth: 12 October 1987 (age 39)
- Place of birth: Pessin, East Germany
- Height: 1.86 m (6 ft 1 in)
- Position: Defender

Team information
- Current team: SV Babelsberg 03
- Number: 3

Youth career
- –2002: VfL Nauen
- 2002–2006: Energie Cottbus

Senior career*
Years	Team	Apps	(Gls)
2006–2007	Energie Cottbus II	30	(2)
2007–2008	Carl Zeiss Jena II	24	(3)
2008–2010	VFC Plauen	62	(1)
2010–2011	SV Babelsberg 03	24	(0)
2011–2013	RB Leipzig	11	(1)
2014–2015	Alemannia Aachen	49	(4)
2015–2017	Hansa Rostock	53	(4)
2018	Chemnitzer FC	3	(0)
2018–2020	Viktoria Berlin	52	(5)
2020–	SV Babelsberg 03	13	(0)
- * Club domestic league appearances and goals as of 12 February 2021

Marcus Hoffmann (born 12 October 1987) is a German footballer who currently plays for SV Babelsberg 03.
