= Christian Beisel =

German footballer

Personal information
- Date of birth: 8 December 1982 (age 43)
- Place of birth: Darmstadt, West Germany
- Height: 1.84 m (6 ft 1/2 in)
- Position: Central defender

Youth career
- –2000: SG Arheilgen
- 2000–2001: Eintracht Frankfurt

Senior career*
Years	Team	Apps	(Gls)
2001–2003	SV Waldhof Mannheim II	11	(0)
2002–2003	SV Waldhof Mannheim	10	(0)
2003–2004	1. FC Eschborn	28	(2)
2004–2006	SV Darmstadt 98	16	(0)
2006–2009	SV Sandhausen	84	(9)
2009–2011	1. FC Heidenheim	47	(1)
2011–2013	SV Darmstadt 98	36	(1)
2013–2014	FC 08 Homburg	21	(1)
2015–2017	SV Niedernhausen	7	(0)
Total		260	(14)
- * Club domestic league appearances and goals

Christian Beisel (born 8 December 1982) is a retired German footballer who played in the 2. Bundesliga for SV Waldhof Mannheim.
