= Bastian Müller =

German footballer

Personal information
- Date of birth: 31 July 1991 (age 35)
- Place of birth: Germany
- Height: 1.80 m (5 ft 11 in)
- Position: Defensive midfielder

Youth career
- Arminia Bielefeld
- –2009: Paderborn 07
- 2009–2010: SC Verl

Senior career*
Years	Team	Apps	(Gls)
2010–2011	SC Verl	15	(1)
2011–2012	Bayern Munich II	28	(0)
2012–2014	Fortuna Düsseldorf II	51	(2)
2014–2016	Alemannia Aachen	40	(3)
2016–2017	Waldhof Mannheim	3	(0)
2017–2019	SC Verl	46	(4)
2019–2021	Rot-Weiß Oberhausen	48	(3)
2022–2023	Wuppertaler SV	26	(1)
2023–2024	Alemannia Aachen	25	(1)
- * Club domestic league appearances and goals as of 18 May 2024

Bastian Müller (born 31 July 1991) is a German footballer who plays as a midfielder.

== Career ==
Müller played as a youth for a number of Westphalian clubs, including Arminia Bielefeld, SC Paderborn and SC Verl, and it was at Verl that he made his breakthrough in senior football, being promoted to the first-team squad for the beginning of the 2010–11 season. He made 15 appearances in the Regionalliga West during the first half of the season, which attracted the attention of Bayern Munich, whom he joined in January 2011. He went straight into Bayern's reserve team, intended to replace David Alaba, who had joined 1899 Hoffenheim on loan, and made his 3. Liga debut on 22 January 2011, replacing fellow debutant Antonio Pangallo in a 2–0 defeat against Wacker Burghausen. Despite being named on Bayern's 'B' list for the 2011–12 UEFA Champions League, he was released by the club in summer 2012. On 1 July 2012, Fortuna Düsseldorf announced that Müller had signed for the club on a two-year contract. After two years with Düsseldorf without making a first-team appearance, Müller signed for Alemannia Aachen of the Regionalliga West.
