= Marc Lerandy =

French German footballer (born 1981)

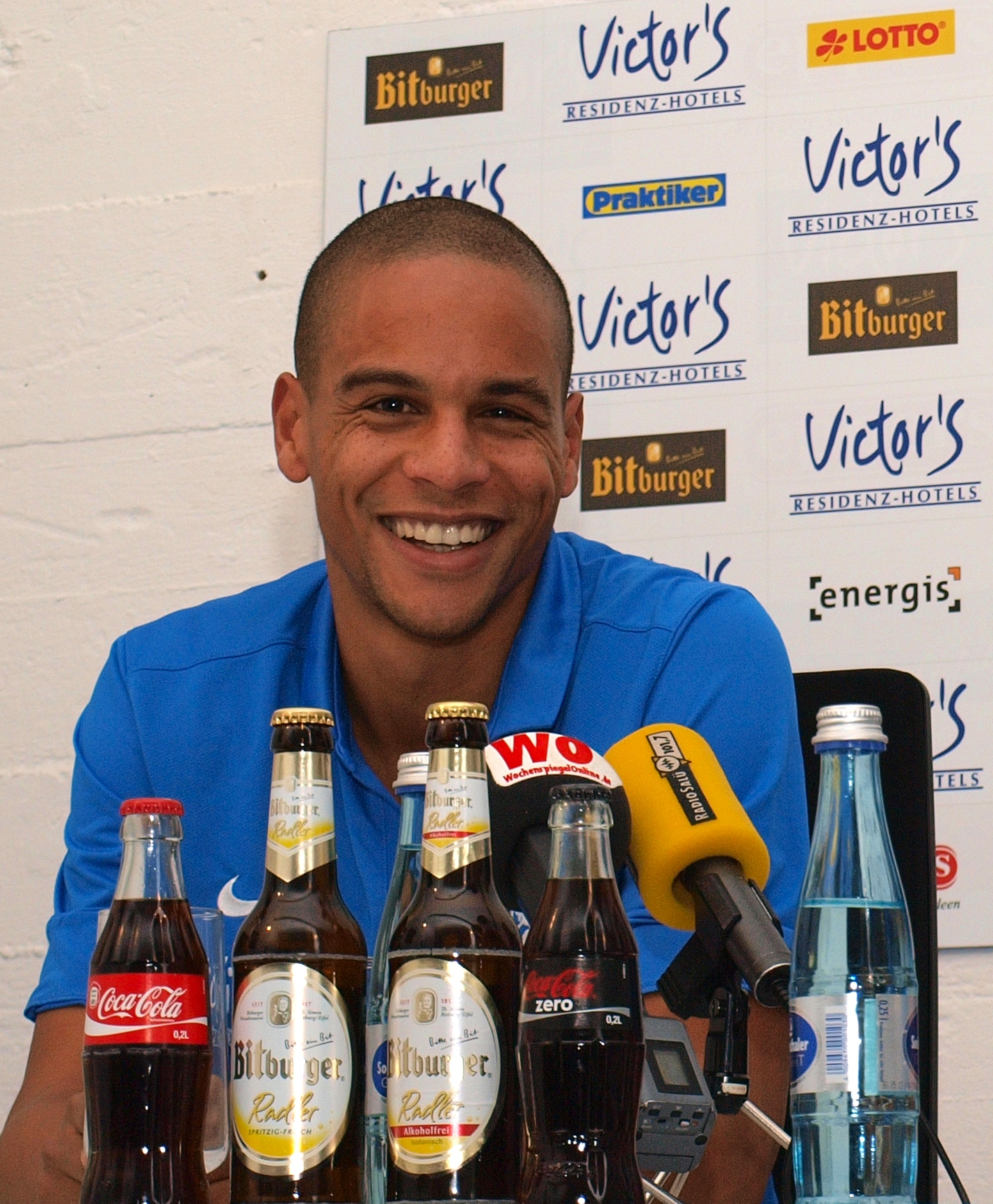
- Lerandy at a 1. FC Saarbrücken press conference in 2012

Personal information
- Date of birth: 25 November 1981 (age 44)
- Place of birth: Lahr, West Germany
- Height: 1.86 m (6 ft 1 in)
- Position: Defender

Team information
- Current team: Offenburger FV (Manager)

Youth career
- Spvgg Lahr 1926
- –2000: SC Freiburg

Senior career*
Years	Team	Apps	(Gls)
2000–2002	SC Freiburg II	44	(2)
2002–2003	SV Sandhausen	10	(1)
2003–2004	FK Pirmasens		
2004–2007	SV Linx		
2007–2008	SC Pfullendorf	33	(3)
2008–2009	VfR Willstätt		
2009–2013	1. FC Saarbrücken	148	(5)
2014–2015	Bahlinger SC	34	(5)

International career
	Germany U-17	2	(0)

Managerial career
- 2015–: Offenburger FV
- * Club domestic league appearances and goals

Marc Lerandy (born 25 November 1981) is a French-German football manager and former player. He is the manager of Offenburger FV.

== Honours ==
- Regionalliga West (IV): 2010
