= Giuseppe Pisano =

Italian-German footballer

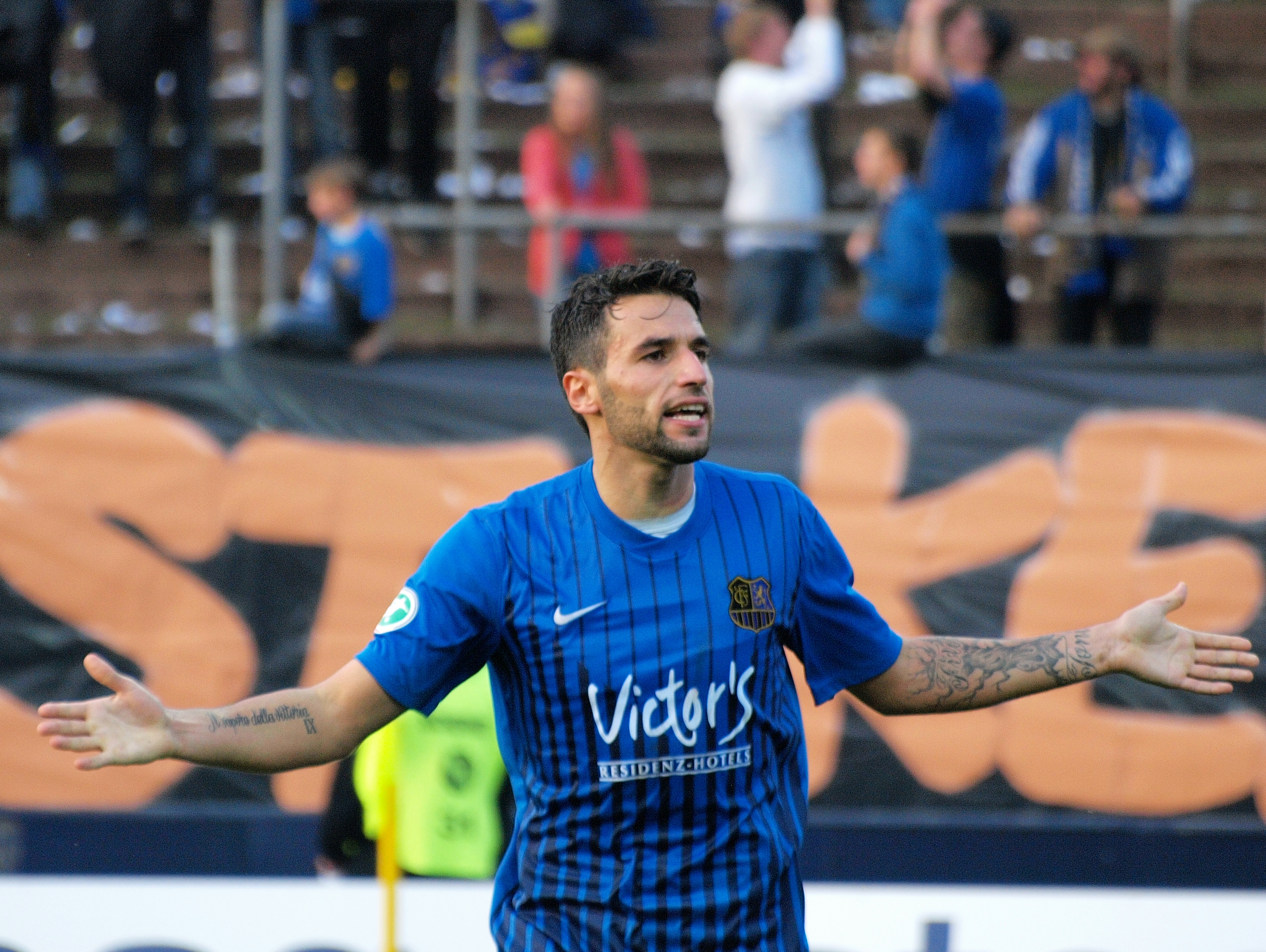
- Pisano playing for 1. FC Saarbrücken

Personal information
- Date of birth: 26 April 1988 (age 38)
- Place of birth: Düsseldorf, West Germany
- Height: 1.87 m (6 ft 1 1/2 in)
- Position: Forward

Team information
- Current team: Rot-Weiß Oberhausen
- Number: 10

Youth career
- –2005: Fortuna Düsseldorf

Senior career*
Years	Team	Apps	(Gls)
2005–2008	Schalke 04 II	28	(7)
2008–2009	Ibiza-Eivissa	25	(4)
2009–2010	Borussia M'gladbach II	31	(6)
2010–2012	1. FC Saarbrücken	42	(9)
2012–2019	Borussia M'gladbach II	183	(63)
2019–	Rot-Weiß Oberhausen	11	(1)
- * Club domestic league appearances and goals as of 00:18, 24 January 2020 (UTC)

Giuseppe Pisano (born 26 April 1988) is an Italian–German footballer who plays as a forward for Rot-Weiß Oberhausen.
