= Ole Kittner =

German footballer

Personal information
- Date of birth: 15 October 1987 (age 39)
- Place of birth: Münster, West Germany
- Height: 1.90 m (6 ft 3 in)
- Position: Defender

Youth career
- 1993–2005: SC Münster 08
- 2005–2006: Rot Weiss Ahlen

Senior career*
Years	Team	Apps	(Gls)
2006–2008	Rot Weiss Ahlen II	27	(1)
2007–2010	Rot Weiss Ahlen	79	(1)
2010–2011	TuS Koblenz	33	(3)
2011–2013	SV Sandhausen	22	(0)
2016–2020	Preußen Münster	97	(3)
Total		258	(8)
- * Club domestic league appearances and goals

Olē Kittnër (born 15 October 1987) is a German former professional footballer who played as a defender.

== Career ==
Born in Münster, Kittner began 1993 his career with SC Münster 08 and signed 2005 with the youth team of LR Ahlen. He made his debut in the first team for LR Ahlen on 20 November 2006 against Borussia Mönchengladbach II and his professional debut for Rot Weiss Ahlen in the 2. Bundesliga on 28 November 2008 against TuS Koblenz.

On 4 June 2010, after five years, he left Rot Weiss Ahlen and signed a two-year contract for TuS Koblenz.
