= Lukas Kohler =

German footballer

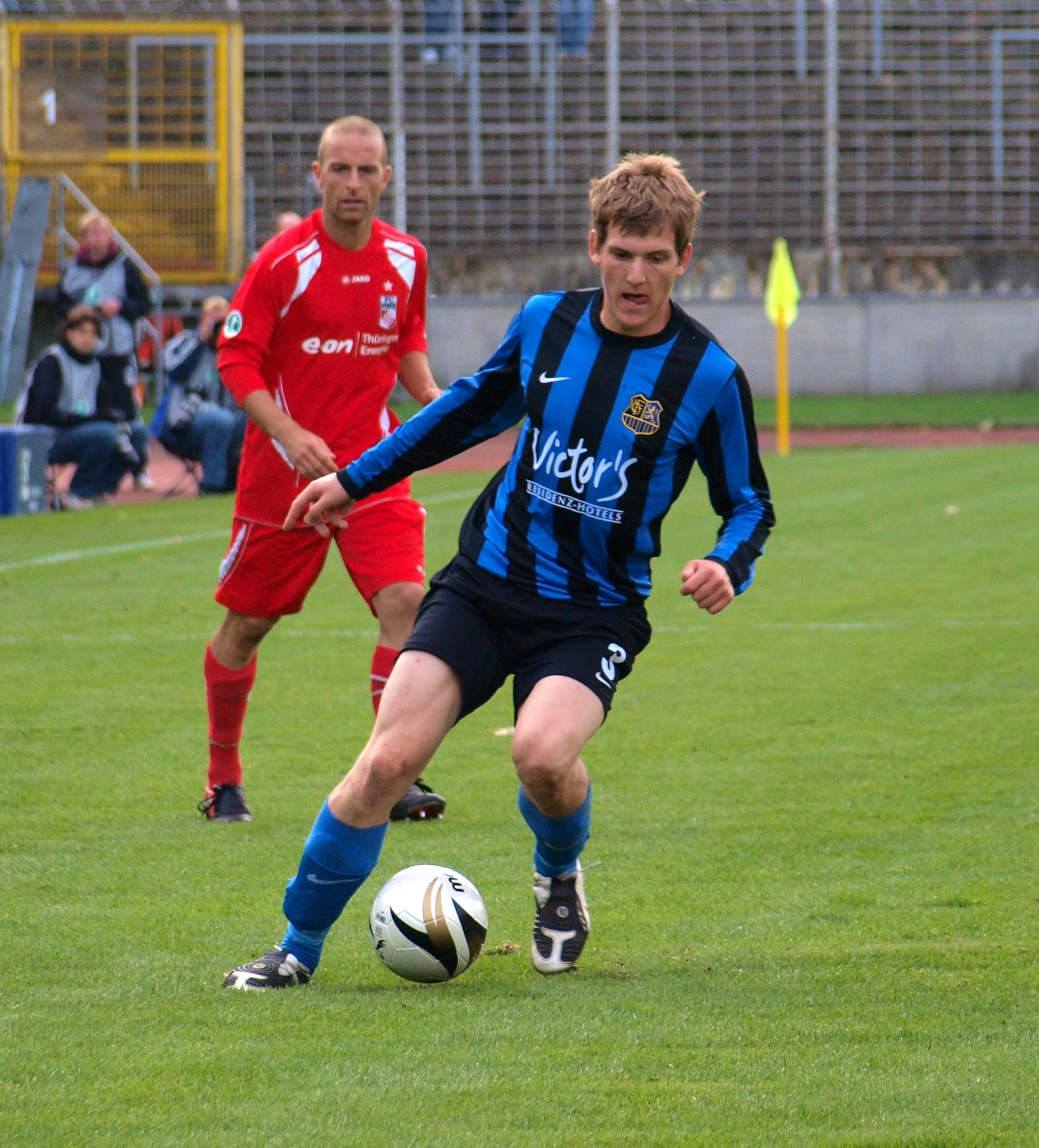
- Lukas Kohler playing against Rot-Weiss Erfurt in his first spell with 1. FC Saarbrücken

Personal information
- Full name: Lukas Kohler
- Date of birth: 24 May 1987 (age 39)
- Place of birth: Saarbrücken, West Germany
- Height: 1.80 m (5 ft 11 in)
- Position: Left wing-back

Team information
- Current team: SV Elversberg
- Number: 2

Youth career
- Viktoria St. Ingbert
- –2002: DJK St. Ingbert
- 2002–2006: 1. FC Saarbrücken

Senior career*
Years	Team	Apps	(Gls)
2006–2013	1. FC Saarbrücken	145	(12)
2013–2014	1. FC Heidenheim	0	(0)
2013	1. FC Heidenheim II	11	(2)
2014	→ 1. FC Saarbrücken (loan)	4	(0)
2014–	SV Elversberg II	6	(0)
2014–	SV Elversberg	163	(12)
- * Club domestic league appearances and goals as of 15 September 2020

Lukas Kohler (born 24 May 1987) is a German footballer who plays for SV Elversberg.

== Honours ==
- Oberliga Südwest (V): 2009
- Regionalliga West (IV): 2010
