= Markus Grübl =

German footballer

Personal information
- Full name: Markus Grübl
- Date of birth: 31 August 1989 (age 37)
- Place of birth: Eggenfelden, West Germany
- Height: 1.69 m (5 ft 7 in)
- Position: Defender

Team information
- Current team: TSV Wasserburg
- Number: 24

Youth career
- SV Schönau
- –2003: FC Vilshofen
- 2003–2008: Wacker Burghausen

Senior career*
Years	Team	Apps	(Gls)
2008–2012	Wacker Burghausen II	33	(5)
2008–2012	Wacker Burghausen	86	(4)
2012–2020	TSV Buchbach	213	(5)
2020–	TSV Wasserburg	2	(0)
- * Club domestic league appearances and goals as of 18:04, 11 February 2021 (UTC)

Markus Grübl (born 31 August 1989) is a German footballer who plays as a defender for TSV 1880 Wasserburg.

== Career ==
Grübl made his professional debut for Wacker Burghausen on 14 February 2009 in the 3. Liga, coming on as a substitute in the 63rd minute for Martin Oslislo against Fortuna Düsseldorf, with the match finishing as a 1–3 away loss.
