= Ingo Feistle =

German footballer

Personal information
- Date of birth: 14 December 1981 (age 44)
- Place of birth: Landsberg am Lech, West Germany
- Position: Left-back

Youth career
- –1995: SSV Dillingen
- 1995–1997: FC Gundelfingen
- 1997–2000: FC Augsburg

Senior career*
| Years | Team | Apps | (Gls) |
| 2000–2004 | FC Augsburg | 2 | (0) |
| 2004–2005 | SSV Glött | | |
| 2005–2014 | 1. FC Heidenheim | 290 | (6) |
- * Club domestic league appearances and goals as of 30 June 2014

Ingo Feistle (born 14 December 1981) is a German footballer who played in the 3. Liga.
