= Marcel Lenz (footballer, born 1987) =

German footballer

Personal information
- Birth name: Marcel Stadel
- Date of birth: 16 February 1987 (age 39)
- Place of birth: Bünde, West Germany
- Height: 1.88 m (6 ft 2 in)
- Position: Centre-back

Youth career
- –2000: SG Hücker-Aschen/Dreyen
- 2000–2002: VfL Mennighüffen
- 2002–2006: Arminia Bielefeld

Senior career*
Years	Team	Apps	(Gls)
2006–2008	Arminia Bielefeld II	56	(1)
2007	Arminia Bielefeld	0	(0)
2008–2010	Hessen Kassel	53	(6)
2010–2013	Kickers Offenbach	44	(1)
2013–2014	VfL Osnabrück	23	(0)
2014–2015	TuS Dassendorf	33	(3)
2015–2016	SC Poppenbüttel		
2016–2022	TuS Dassendorf	128	(8)
- * Club domestic league appearances and goals

Marcel Lenz (born 16 February 1987) is a German former professional footballer who played as a centre-back. In 2014, Lenz got married in 2014 and took his wife's last name. He was born Marcel Stadel.
