= Manuel Menzel =

German footballer

Personal information
- Full name: Manuel Menzel
- Date of birth: 29 September 1987 (age 39)
- Place of birth: Frankfurt, Germany
- Height: 1.75 m (5 ft 9 in)
- Position: Defender

Team information
- Current team: Kickers Emden
- Number: 27

Youth career
- –2005: Werder Bremen
- 2005–2006: Kickers Emden

Senior career*
Years	Team	Apps	(Gls)
2006–	Kickers Emden	180	(1)
- * Club domestic league appearances and goals as of 20:42, 3 January 2021 (UTC)

Manuel Menzel (born 29 September 1987) is a German footballer who plays as a defender for Kickers Emden.

== Career ==
Menzel made his professional debut for Kickers Emden on 5 April 2009, coming on as a substitute in the 89th minute for Jan-André Sievers in the 1–2 away loss against SV Sandhausen.
