= Kevin Wölk =

German footballer

Personal information
- Full name: Kevin Wölk
- Date of birth: 28 May 1985 (age 41)
- Place of birth: Oldenburg in Holstein, West Germany
- Height: 1.81 m (5 ft 11 in)
- Position: Midfielder

Youth career
- –2002: Oldenburger SV
- 2002–2003: VfB Lübeck
- 2003–2004: Hamburger SV

Senior career*
| Years | Team | Apps | (Gls) |
| 2004–2006 | Holstein Kiel II | 58 | (10) |
| 2006–2007 | VfB Lübeck | 14 | (1) |
| 2007–2008 | VfL Bochum II | 26 | (2) |
| 2008–2010 | KSV Hessen Kassel | 63 | (18) |
| 2010–2011 | Rot Weiss Ahlen | 36 | (3) |
| 2011–2012 | Darmstadt 98 | 27 | (5) |
| 2012–2013 | FSV Frankfurt II | 28 | (6) |
| 2013–2014 | Wormatia Worms | 27 | (2) |
| 2014–2015 | VfB Lübeck | 15 | (0) |
| 2015–2018 | Eutin 08 | 91 | (17) |
- * Club domestic league appearances and goals

Kevin Wölk (born 28 May 1985) is a German former professional football midfielder who played as a midfielder.
