= Matthias Rudolph =

German footballer and coach

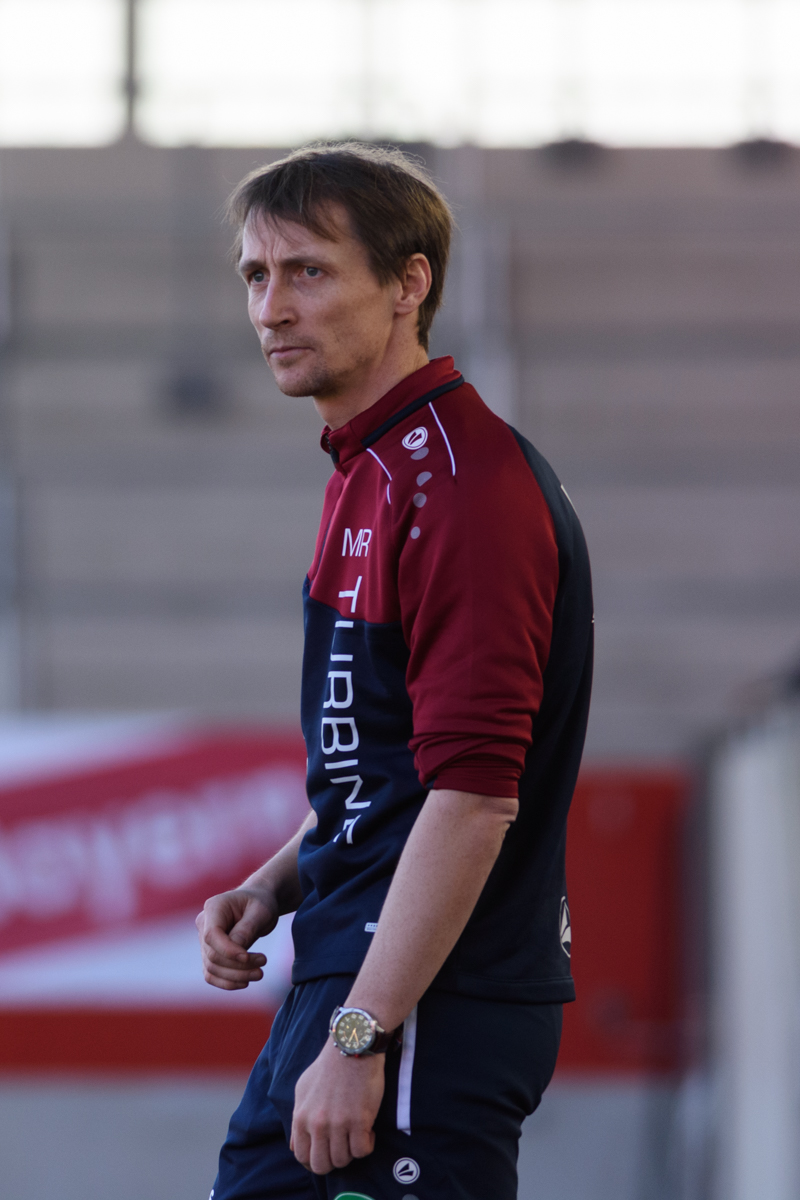

Personal information
- Date of birth: 6 September 1982 (age 44)
- Place of birth: Belzig, East Germany
- Height: 1.77 m (5 ft 9 1/2 in)
- Position: Left-back

Youth career
- FSV Grün-Weiß Niemegk
- Stahl Brandenburg
- –2001: SV Babelsberg 03

Senior career*
Years	Team	Apps	(Gls)
2001–2003	SV Babelsberg 03		
2003–2005	Hessen Kassel	63	(4)
2005–2006	KSV Baunatal	34	(1)
2006–2013	SV Babelsberg 03	182	(1)

Managerial career
- 2015–2020: Turbine Potsdam
- * Club domestic league appearances and goals

Matthias Rudolph (born 6 September 1982) is a German football coach and former footballer.
