= Julian Lüttmann =

German footballer

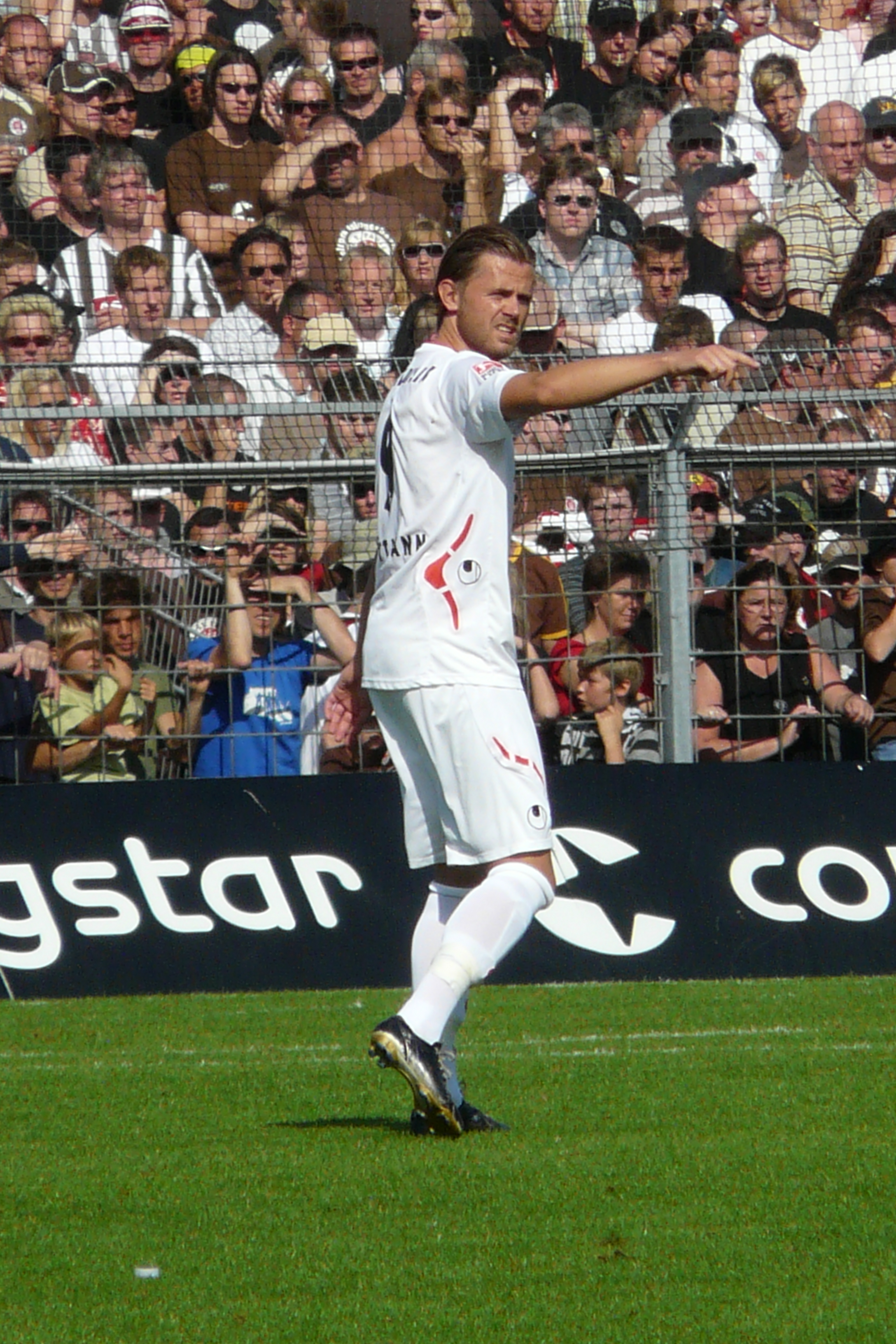
- Lüttmann in 2008

Personal information
- Date of birth: 19 April 1982 (age 44)
- Place of birth: Rheine, West Germany
- Height: 1.86 m (6 ft 1 in)
- Position: Striker

Youth career
- SC Hörstel

Senior career*
Years	Team	Apps	(Gls)
–2002	Preußen Münster	8	(0)
2003–2004	Holstein Kiel	21	(1)
2004–2005	FC Eintracht Rheine	29	(8)
2005–2007	Sportfreunde Lotte	66	(36)
2007–2009	Rot-Weiß Oberhausen	65	(14)
2009–2010	Sandhausen	11	(2)
2010–2011	Rot-Weiß Erfurt	32	(0)
2011–2013	VfB Oldenburg	52	(30)
2013–2014	SSV Jeddeloh	14	(6)
- * Club domestic league appearances and goals

Julian Lüttmann (born 19 April 1982) is a German former footballer who played as a striker.

== Career ==
Lüttmann was born in Rheine. He made his debut on the professional league level in the 2. Bundesliga for Rot-Weiß Oberhausen on 17 August 2008, when he came on as a substitute in the 65th minute in a game against TuS Koblenz

After retiring in September 2014, Lüttmann worked as sports director for his former club VfB Oldenburg until the summer 2015.

== Honours ==
- Top scorer in the Oberliga Westfalen: 2006–07 (24 goals)
