= Markus Hayer =

German footballer (born 1985)

Personal information
- Date of birth: 18 August 1985 (age 41)
- Place of birth: Germany
- Height: 1.85 m (6 ft 1 in)
- Positions: Winger; striker

Team information
- Current team: VfR Marienhagen

Youth career
- –2003: Bayer Leverkusen

Senior career*
Years	Team	Apps	(Gls)
2003–2004	Bayer Leverkusen II	2	(0)
2004–2010	Germania Windeck	70	(17)
2010–2012	Kickers Offenbach	24	(4)
2012–2014	1. FC Saarbrücken	13	(1)
2014	Bayer Leverkusen II	0	(0)
2014–2015	Sportfreunde Siegen	19	(2)
2015–2017	FV Wiehl		

Managerial career
- 2015–2017: FV Wiehl (playing assistant)
- * Club domestic league appearances and goals

Markus Hayer (born 18 August 1985) is a German former footballer.

== Career ==
Hayer played in the U19 team of Bayer 04 Leverkusen for two years. In 2004, he moved to TSV Germania Windeck.

In 2010, he signed a two-year contract with Kickers Offenbach of the 3. Liga. He made his debut in a surprise 3–0 win over VfL Bochum in the first round of the DFB-Pokal, as a late substitute for Olivier Occean. After two years without fully establishing himself at Offenbach, he signed for 1. FC Saarbrücken in July 2012. He was released by Saarbrücken in January 2014, after an injury-hit eighteen months with the club, and returned to his first club, signing for Bayer Leverkusen II. He left Leverkusen for a second time when the club disbanded its reserve team at the end of the 2013–14 season.
