= Dennis Hillebrand =

German footballer and manager

Personal information
- Date of birth: 30 November 1979 (age 46)
- Place of birth: Leonberg, West Germany
- Height: 1.89 m (6 ft 2 in)
- Position: Defender

Youth career
- TSF Ditzingen
- VfB Stuttgart

Senior career*
Years	Team	Apps	(Gls)
1998–2000	TSF Ditzingen	38	(3)
2000–2001	VfR Aalen	28	(3)
2001–2003	Greuther Fürth	19	(1)
2003–2004	LR Ahlen	13	(1)
2004–2007	VfR Aalen	94	(13)
2007–2009	FSV Frankfurt	43	(3)
2009–2011	Rot-Weiß Erfurt	57	(1)
Total		292	(25)
- * Club domestic league appearances and goals

Dennis Hillebrand (born 30 November 1979 in Leonberg) is a German former professional footballer who played as a defender.
