= Tim Bauer =

German former professional footballer

Personal information
- Date of birth: January 16, 1985 (age 41)
- Place of birth: Mannheim, West Germany
- Position: Defender

Senior career*
Years	Team	Apps	(Gls)
2004–2005	Werder Bremen II	15	(1)
2005–2006	1899 Hoffenheim	1	(0)
2006–2007	1899 Hoffenheim II	0	(0)
2007–2008	SV Sandhausen	24	(0)
2008–2009	Sportfreunde Siegen	32	(3)
2009–2011	VfR Aalen	56	(7)
2011–2014	Wormatia Worms	63	(15)
Total		191	(26)

International career
2002	Germany U-17	2	(0)
2003	Germany U-19	4	(0)
2004–2005	Germany U-20	4	(0)
- * Club domestic league appearances and goals

Tim Bauer (born January 16, 1985) is a German former professional footballer who played as a defender.
