= Florian Nagel =

German footballer

Personal information
- Date of birth: 13 March 1992 (age 34)
- Place of birth: Stade, Germany
- Height: 1.80 m (5 ft 11 in)
- Position: Midfielder

Youth career
- –2007: Werder Bremen
- 2007–2008: SV Drochtersen/Assel
- 2008–2010: Werder Bremen

Senior career*
Years	Team	Apps	(Gls)
2010–2013	Werder Bremen II	61	(3)
2013–2014	Hessen Kassel	21	(0)
2014–2022	SV Drochtersen/Assel	144	(21)
- * Club domestic league appearances and goals as of 00:59, 28 December 2022 (UTC)

Florian Nagel (born 13 March 1992) is a German former professional footballer who most recently played as a midfielder for SV Drochtersen/Assel.
