= Sebastian Wolf (footballer, born 1985) =

German footballer

Personal information
- Date of birth: 19 January 1985 (age 41)
- Place of birth: Mainleus, West Germany
- Height: 1.83 m (6 ft 0 in)
- Positions: Centre-back; left-back

Youth career
- SV Hallstadt
- FC Bayern Hof
- –2004: 1. FC Nürnberg

Senior career*
| Years | Team | Apps | (Gls) |
| 2004–2007 | Greuther Fürth II | 79 | (2) |
| 2007–2009 | Wacker Burghausen | 26 | (0) |
| 2009–2010 | VfB Stuttgart II | 4 | (0) |
| 2010–2011 | SV Wehen Wiesbaden | 17 | (0) |
| 2011–2014 | SV Elversberg | 86 | (5) |
| 2014–2016 | FC Homburg | 51 | (0) |
| Total | | 263 | (7) |
- * Club domestic league appearances and goals

Sebastian Wolf (born 19 January 1985) is a German former professional footballer who played as a centre-back or left-back.
