= Florian Hörnig =

German footballer

Personal information
- Date of birth: 6 August 1986 (age 40)
- Place of birth: Munich, West Germany
- Height: 1.92 m (6 ft 3 1/2 in)
- Position: Central defender

Youth career
- 1994–2000: SV Am Hart
- 2000–2001: TSV Milbertshofen
- 2001–2005: SpVgg Unterhaching

Senior career*
Years	Team	Apps	(Gls)
2005–2009	SpVgg Unterhaching II	53	(2)
2006–2009	SpVgg Unterhaching	36	(1)
2009–2011	Jahn Regensburg	59	(1)
2011–2013	Chemnitzer FC	52	(1)
2013–2017	Fortuna Köln	102	(5)
2017–2019	1. FC Köln II	17	(2)
- * Club domestic league appearances and goals as of 2 April 2019

Florian Hörnig (born 6 August 1986) is a German footballer who most recently played for 1. FC Köln II.
