= Lucas Albrecht =

German footballer (born 1991)

Personal information
- Date of birth: 9 January 1991 (age 35)
- Place of birth: Neubrandenburg, Germany
- Height: 1.93 m (6 ft 4 in)
- Position: Defender

Team information
- Current team: FSV 63 Luckenwalde
- Number: 5

Youth career
- 1996–2008: 1. FC Neubrandenburg 04
- 2008–2010: Hansa Rostock

Senior career*
Years	Team	Apps	(Gls)
2010–2013	Hansa Rostock	43	(2)
2013–2015	SV Babelsberg 03	59	(10)
2015–2016	TSG Neustrelitz	30	(3)
2016–2018	Hessen Kassel	62	(10)
2018–2021	Kickers Offenbach	57	(1)
2021–2023	VSG Altglienicke	30	(0)
2023–	FSV 63 Luckenwalde	28	(0)
- * Club domestic league appearances and goals as of 1 January 2025

Lucas Albrecht (born 9 January 1991) is a German footballer who plays as a defender for FSV 63 Luckenwalde.
