= Alexander Maul =

German footballer

Personal information
- Date of birth: 24 September 1976 (age 50)
- Place of birth: Neuendettelsau, West Germany
- Height: 1.88 m (6 ft 2 in)
- Position: Midfielder

Team information
- Current team: FV Dittenheim (manager)

Youth career
- SpVgg Ansbach
- –1997: DJK Schwabach
- 1997–1998: TSV Neustadt/Aisch

Senior career*
Years	Team	Apps	(Gls)
1998–2000	SG Quelle/1860 Fürth		
2000–2001	Rot-Weiß Oberhausen	5	(0)
2001–2002	SSV Jahn Regensburg	52	(3)
2002–2008	FC Carl Zeiss Jena	186	(40)
2008–2011	SSV Jahn Regensburg	92	(1)
2011–2012	FC Carl Zeiss Jena	14	(1)
2012–2013	SV Seligenporten	35	(3)
2013–2015	TuRa Untermünkheim		
2015–2017	DJK Schwabach		

Managerial career
- 2014–2015: TuRa Untermünkheim (player-coach)
- 2016–2017: SC 04 Schwabach
- 2018–2020: SSV Jahn Regensburg (U19)
- 2023–: FV Dittenheim
- * Club domestic league appearances and goals

Alexander Maul (born 24 September 1976) is a German football manager and a former midfielder who is the manager of FV Dittenheim.
