= Alper Bagceci =

German footballer

Personal information
- Date of birth: 16 April 1984 (age 42)
- Place of birth: Ulm, West Germany
- Height: 1.80 m (5 ft 11 in)
- Position: Right midfielder

Team information
- Current team: Türkspor Neu-Ulm
- Number: 20

Youth career
- –2003: SSV Ulm 1846

Senior career*
| Years | Team | Apps | (Gls) |
| 2003–2006 | SSV Ulm 1846 | 91 | (13) |
| 2006–2015 | 1. FC Heidenheim | 260 | (27) |
| 2015–2019 | SSV Ulm 1846 | 56 | (8) |
| 2019– | Türkspor Neu-Ulm | 23 | (8) |
- * Club domestic league appearances and goals as of 17:58, 18 January 2021 (UTC)

Alper Bagceci (born 16 April 1984) is a German footballer who plays for Türkspor Neu-Ulm.
