= Mario Hohn =

German footballer

Personal information
- Full name: Mario Hohn
- Date of birth: 28 March 1989 (age 37)
- Place of birth: Bietigheim-Bissingen, West Germany
- Height: 1.65 m (5 ft 5 in)
- Position: Midfielder

Youth career
- TSV Unterriexingen
- SGV Freiberg
- –2008: VfB Stuttgart

Senior career*
Years	Team	Apps	(Gls)
2008–2011	VfR Aalen	52	(0)
2013–2016	FC Nöttingen	69	(0)
2016–2018	TSV Essingen	14	(2)
2018–2021	SGM Riexingen		
- * Club domestic league appearances and goals

Mario Hohn (born 28 March 1989) is a German footballer who plays as a midfielder.

== Career ==
Hohn made his professional debut for VfR Aalen in the 3. Liga on 4 October 2008, coming on as a substitute in the 74th minute for Marijo Marić in the 0–3 away loss against Union Berlin.
