= Martin Ullmann =

German footballer

Personal information
- Date of birth: 11 December 1986 (age 39)
- Place of birth: Erfurt, East Germany
- Height: 1.80 m (5 ft 11 in)
- Position: Forward

Youth career
- –2005: Rot-Weiß Erfurt

Senior career*
Years	Team	Apps	(Gls)
2005–2007	Rot-Weiß Erfurt II	45	(3)
2007	Rot-Weiß Erfurt	3	(0)
2007–2008	Carl Zeiss Jena II	28	(9)
2008–2012	Carl Zeiss Jena	39	(3)
2012–2014	FSV Zwickau	34	(3)
2014–2015	FC Thüringen Weida	5	(0)
2016	Carl Zeiss Jena II	4	(1)

Managerial career
- 2015–2016: Carl Zeiss Jena U19 (assistant)
- 2016–2018: Carl Zeiss Jena (assistant)
- * Club domestic league appearances and goals

Martin Ullmann (born 11 December 1986 in Erfurt) is a German retired footballer who played as an attacker. He played in the 3. Liga for Carl Zeiss Jena.
