= Julian Prochnow =

German footballer

Personal information
- Full name: Julian Prochnow
- Date of birth: 1 July 1986 (age 40)
- Place of birth: Berlin, Germany
- Height: 1.84 m (6 ft 0 in)
- Position: Midfielder

Youth career
- 2003–2005: Tennis Borussia Berlin

Senior career*
Years	Team	Apps	(Gls)
2005–2015	SV Babelsberg 03	197	(11)
Total		197	(11)
- * Club domestic league appearances and goals

Julian Prochnow (born 1 July 1986) is a German former footballer who played as a midfielder.
