= Patrick Amrhein =

German footballer

Personal information
- Full name: Patrick Rigobert Amrhein
- Date of birth: 20 October 1989 (age 37)
- Place of birth: Aschaffenburg, West Germany
- Height: 1.87 m (6 ft 2 in)
- Position: Midfielder

Team information
- Current team: TuS Frammersbach
- Number: 19

Youth career
- 2001–2006: SG Strietwald
- 2006–2008: FC Carl Zeiss Jena

Senior career*
Years	Team	Apps	(Gls)
2007–2010	FC Carl Zeiss Jena II	43	(7)
2007–2009	FC Carl Zeiss Jena	34	(2)
2010–2011	Eintracht Braunschweig	11	(1)
2010–2011	Eintracht Braunschweig II	12	(1)
2011–2012	SpVgg Unterhaching	2	(0)
2012	Bayern Alzenau	10	(0)
2012–2013	Viktoria Aschaffenburg	21	(2)
2013–2015	SV Bavaria Wiesen		
2015–2019	SV Großwallstadt		
2019–	TuS Frammersbach	8	(12)

Managerial career
- 2019–: TuS Frammersbach
- * Club domestic league appearances and goals as of 22 January 2021

Patrick Rigobert Amrhein (born 20 October 1989 in Aschaffenburg) is a German footballer who plays for TuS Frammersbach.
