= Dennis Riemer =

German footballer

Personal information
- Date of birth: February 23, 1988 (age 38)
- Place of birth: Wolfsburg, West Germany
- Position: Right back

Youth career
- FC Reislingen/Neuhaus
- –2007: VfL Wolfsburg

Senior career*
Years	Team	Apps	(Gls)
2007–2011	VfL Wolfsburg II	78	(8)
2010–2011	→ TuS Koblenz (loan)	33	(1)
2011–2014	Arminia Bielefeld	29	(1)
- * Club domestic league appearances and goals as of 3 November 2012

Dennis Riemer (born February 23, 1988) is a German footballer who played in the 3. Liga for TuS Koblenz and Arminia Bielefeld.
