= David Müller (footballer, born 1991) =

German footballer

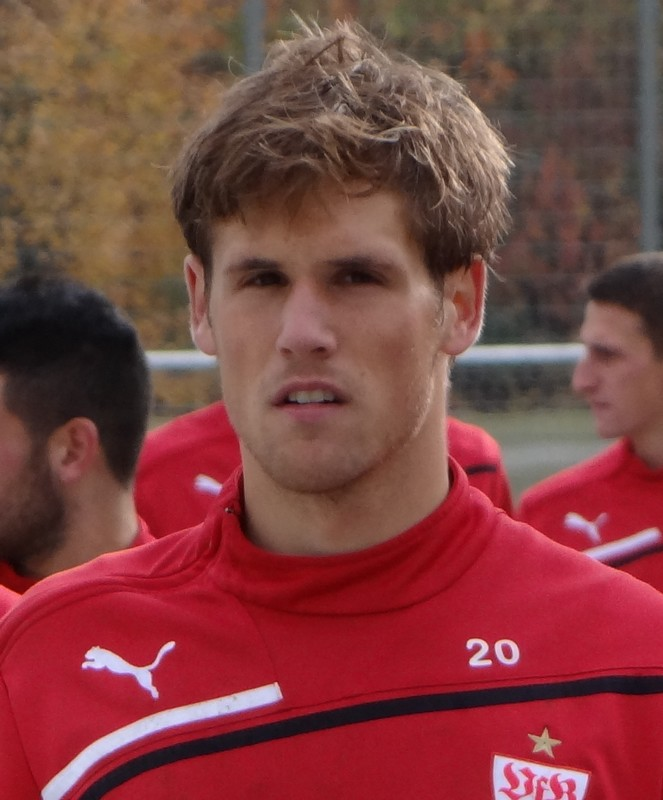

Personal information
- Date of birth: 1 November 1991 (age 35)
- Place of birth: Esslingen am Neckar, Germany
- Height: 1.75 m (5 ft 9 in)
- Position: Midfielder

Team information
- Current team: TSG Backnang 1919
- Number: 5

Youth career
- 1997–2004: TSV Baltmannsweiler
- 2004–2006: FV 09 Nürtingen
- 2006–2009: Stuttgarter Kickers
- 2009–2010: VfB Stuttgart

Senior career*
Years	Team	Apps	(Gls)
2010–2011	VfB Stuttgart II	5	(1)
2012–2014	FC Schalke 04 II	68	(2)
2014–2016	SV Rödinghausen	66	(0)
2016–2018	Stuttgarter Kickers	35	(0)
2018–2022	SGV Freiberg	66	(5)
2023–	TSG Backnang 1919	15	(0)
- * Club domestic league appearances and goals as of 20 July 2024

David Müller (born 1 November 1991) is a German footballer who plays as a midfielder for TSG Backnang 1919.

== Career ==
On 20 April 2011 Müller had his debut for VfB Stuttgart II in the 3. Liga against Kickers Offenbach. Four days later he scored his first goal in the 3. Liga against Rot Weiss Ahlen.

On 1 January 2012 Müller moved to FC Schalke 04 II.
