= Marcel Avdić =

German footballer

Personal information
- Date of birth: 28 February 1991 (age 35)
- Place of birth: Stuttgart, Germany
- Height: 1.77 m (5 ft 10 in)
- Position: Midfielder

Youth career
- 1998–2004: TSV Mühlhausen
- 2004–2008: Stuttgarter Kickers
- 2008–2010: Karlsruher SC

Senior career*
Years	Team	Apps	(Gls)
2010–2012	SpVgg Unterhaching	46	(7)
2012–2013	Kickers Offenbach	13	(1)
2014	Waldhof Mannheim	8	(0)
2014	Oțelul Galați	8	(0)
2017	Teutonia Watzenborn-Steinberg	7	(0)
2017–2019	SSV Reutlingen	56	(12)
2019–2020	Göppinger SV	16	(3)
- * Club domestic league appearances and goals as of 12:44, 21 December 2017 (UTC)

Marcel Avdić (born 28 February 1991) is a German professional footballer who plays as a midfielder. He has played in the 3. Liga and in the Romanian Liga I.
