= Marco Rapp =

German footballer

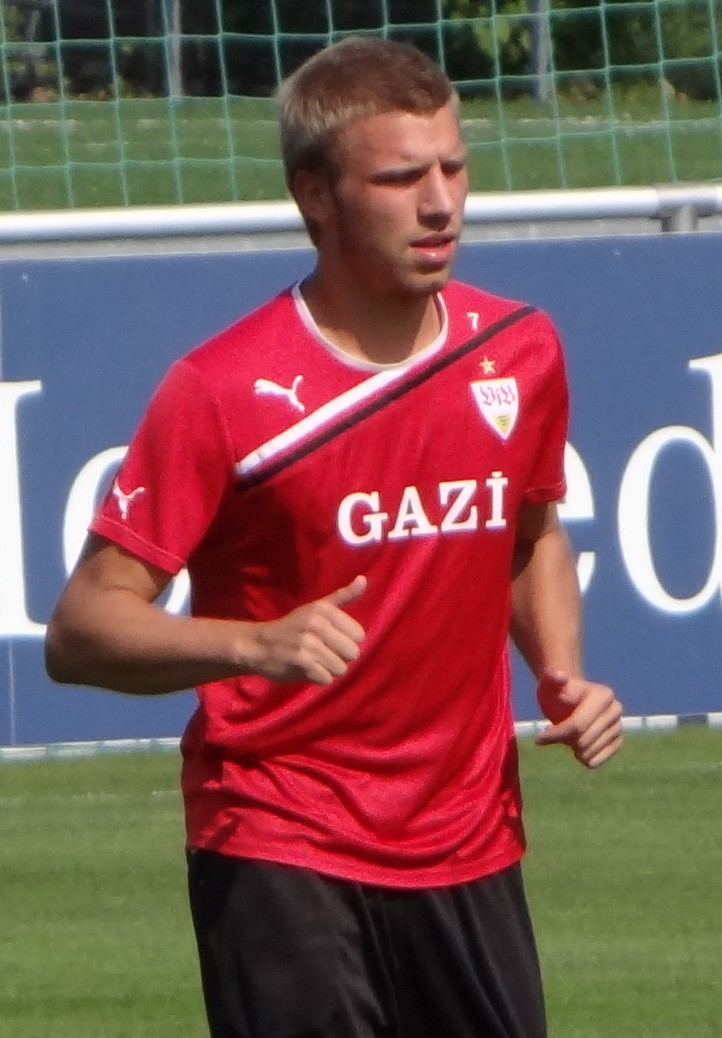
- Rapp training with VfB Stuttgart II

Personal information
- Date of birth: 5 June 1991 (age 35)
- Place of birth: Nuremberg, Germany
- Height: 1.82 m (6 ft 0 in)
- Position: Midfielder

Youth career
- –2008: 1. FC Nürnberg
- 2008–2009: Greuther Fürth

Senior career*
Years	Team	Apps	(Gls)
2009–2010	Greuther Fürth II	4	(0)
2010–2013	VfB Stuttgart II	17	(0)
2013–2015	Greuther Fürth	4	(1)
2013–2015	Greuther Fürth II	39	(2)
2015–2016	Chemnitzer FC	1	(0)
2016–2018	Kickers Offenbach	63	(0)
2018–2019	SpVgg Bayreuth	1	(0)
Total		129	(3)
- * Club domestic league appearances and goals

Marco Rapp (born 5 June 1991) is a German former professional footballer who played as a midfielder.
