= Stefan Binder =

German footballer

Personal information
- Full name: Stefan Binder
- Date of birth: 12 October 1978 (age 48)
- Place of birth: Waldkirchen, West Germany
- Height: 1.80 m (5 ft 11 in)
- Position: Defender

Youth career
- DJK Karlsbach
- 1860 Munich

Senior career*
Years	Team	Apps	(Gls)
–2000	SV Hutthurm		
2000–2001	Wacker Burghausen	15	(0)
2002–2006	Jahn Regensburg	100	(8)
2006–2007	Sportfreunde Siegen	17	(0)
2007–2012	Jahn Regensburg	147	(1)
- * Club domestic league appearances and goals

Stefan Binder (born 12 October 1978) is a German former professional footballer who played as a defender.

== Career ==
Binder was born in Waldkirchen. He started his senior career at the SV Hutthurm but left soon for SV Wacker Burghausen. In the 2002–03 season, he moved to SSV Jahn Regensburg where he stayed during the promotion to the 2. Bundesliga in 2003–04 and the relegation to Regionalliga Süd the following season. When SSV Jahn Regensburg was relegated again to the Bayernliga in the 2005–06 season, he left for Sportfreunde Siegen but returned in 2007.

In Regensburg he acquired the nickname "Bimbo" in reference to Franz Binder.
