= Orkan Balkan =

German footballer

Personal information
- Date of birth: 12 March 1987 (age 39)
- Place of birth: Munich, West Germany
- Height: 1.75 m (5 ft 9 in)
- Position: Striker

Team information
- Current team: FC Anadolu München

Youth career
- –2003: TSV Forstenried
- 2003–2007: SpVgg Unterhaching

Senior career*
| Years | Team | Apps | (Gls) |
| 2006–2007 | SpVgg Unterhaching II | 41 | (4) |
| 2007–2011 | SpVgg Unterhaching | 61 | (3) |
| 2011–2012 | Orduspor | 1 | (0) |
| 2012 | → Bugsaşspor (loan) | 0 | (0) |
| 2012–2014 | Çankırıspor | 39 | (1) |
| 2014–2015 | SV Pullach | 13 | (2) |
| 2015– | FC Anadolu München | 0 | (0) |
- * Club domestic league appearances and goals as of 3 August 2015

Orkan Balkan (born 12 March 1987) is a German footballer who plays for FC Anadolu München. He currently plays for Çankırıspor.
