= Peter Schyrba =

German footballer

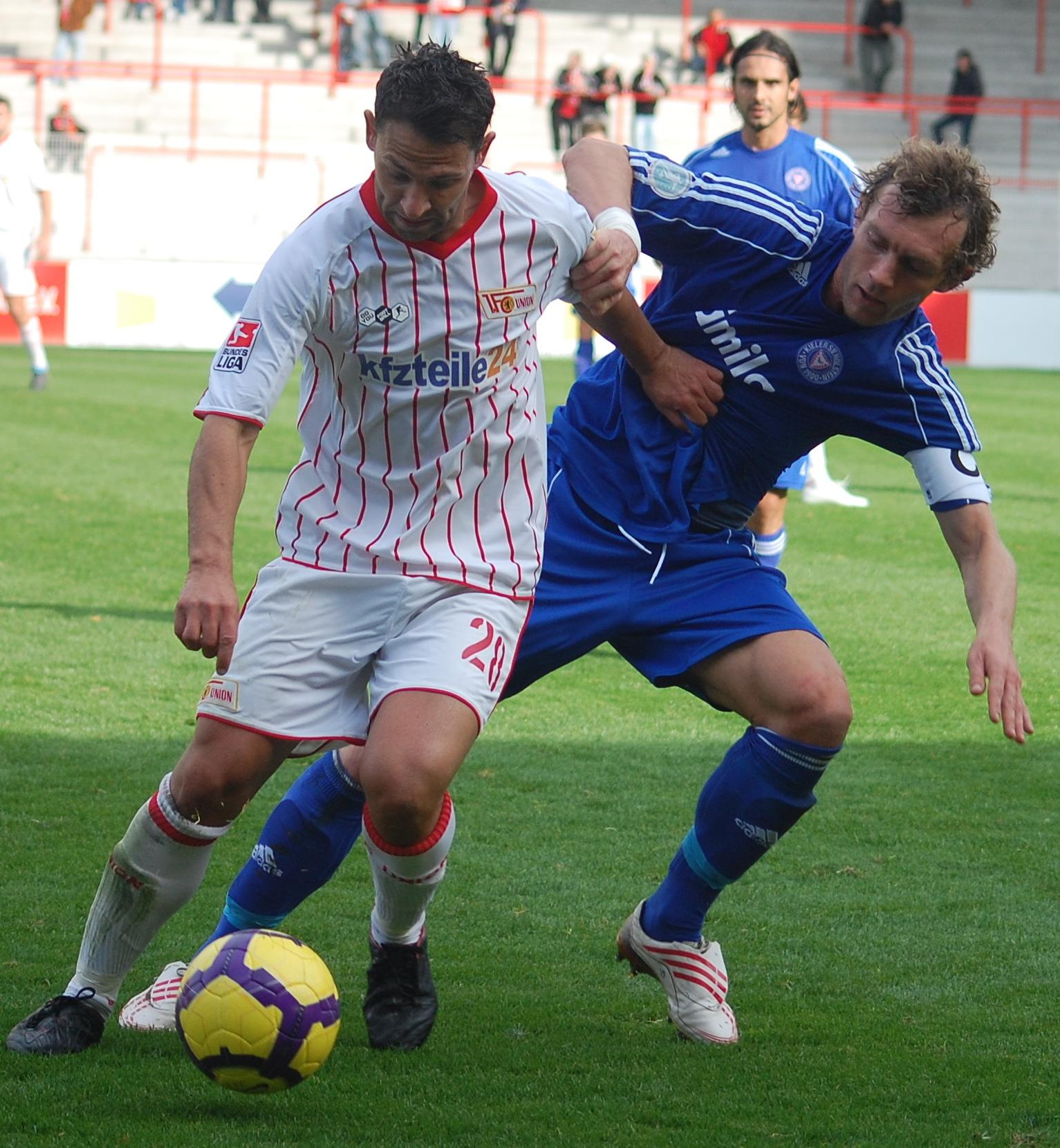

Personal information
- Date of birth: October 17, 1980 (age 46)
- Place of birth: Ozimek, Poland
- Position: Defender

Youth career
- Schwarz-Weiß Essen
- Union Mülheim
- 1. FC Mülheim

Senior career*
Years	Team	Apps	(Gls)
1998–2001	MSV Duisburg	5	(0)
2001–2006	Preußen Münster	141	(2)
2006–2007	Panserraikos	29	(0)
2007–2010	Holstein Kiel	91	(3)
2010–2012	Hansa Rostock	52	(2)
- * Club domestic league appearances and goals as of 1 July 2012

Peter Schyrba (born October 17, 1980) is a German footballer who played in the 2. Bundesliga for MSV Duisburg and Hansa Rostock.
