= Fabian Wetter =

German footballer

Personal information
- Date of birth: 30 March 1989 (age 37)
- Place of birth: Lübbecke, Germany
- Position: Left-back

Team information
- Current team: Holstein Kiel
- Number: 17

Youth career
- SC Hille
- SV Bölhorst-Häverstädt
- SV Kutenhausen-Todtenhausen
- –2008: Hannover 96

Senior career*
Years	Team	Apps	(Gls)
2008–2009	TSV Havelse	32	(6)
2009–2010	SV Bavenstedt	7	(1)
2010–20111	TSV Havelse	41	(9)
2011–	Holstein Kiel	100	(8)
2011	Holstein Kiel II	6	(1)
- * Club domestic league appearances and goals as of 10 December 2014

Fabian Wetter (born 30 March 1989, in Lübbecke) is a German footballer who plays for Holstein Kiel.
