= Velimir Grgić =

Croatian footballer

Personal information
- Date of birth: 11 May 1978 (age 48)
- Place of birth: Vinkovci, Yugoslavia
- Position: Forward

Team information
- Current team: Nk Dilj Vinkovci

Senior career*
Years	Team	Apps	(Gls)
1999–2002	Cibalia	61	(9)
2002–2005	TuS Koblenz	84	(31)
2005–2007	Kickers Emden	68	(11)
2007–2009	SV Sandhausen	39	(12)
2009	Holstein Kiel	13	(2)
2009–2011	1. FC Saarbrücken	53	(10)
Total		312	(75)
- * Club domestic league appearances and goals

Velimir Grgić (born 11 May 1978) is a Croatian retired footballer.

== Honours ==
- Regionalliga Nord (IV): 2009
- Regionalliga West (IV): 2010
