= Markus Fuchs (footballer) =

German footballer

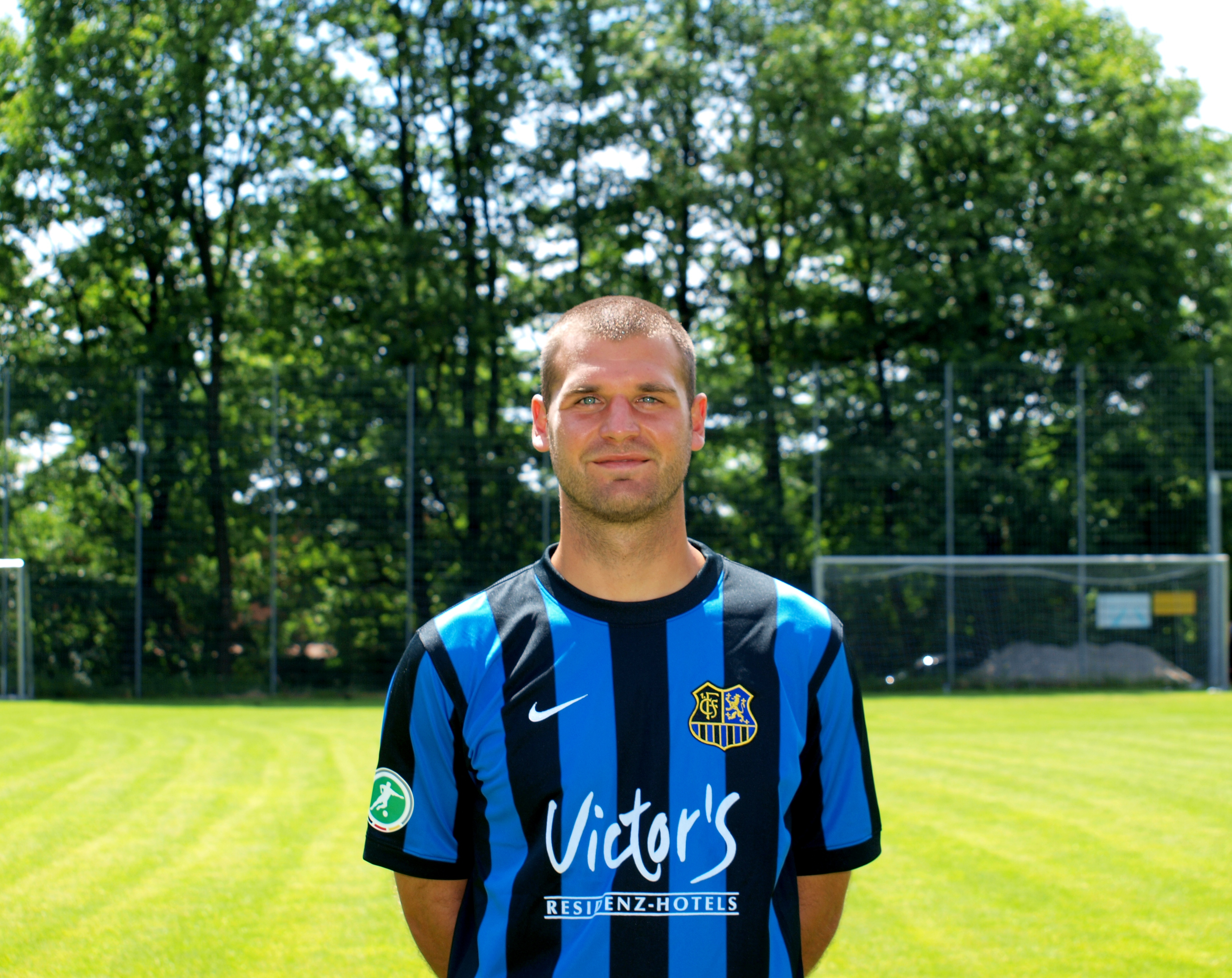
- Fuchs with 1. FC Saarbrücken

Personal information
- Date of birth: 24 February 1980 (age 46)
- Place of birth: Rottweil, West Germany
- Height: 1.84 m (6 ft 0 in)
- Position: Striker

Youth career
- –2000: SV Zimmern

Senior career*
Years	Team	Apps	(Gls)
2000–2003	1. FC Nürnberg II	84	(40)
2003–2005	SC Pfullendorf	45	(6)
2005–2008	SpVgg Bayreuth	75	(33)
2008–2010	1. FC Nürnberg II	38	(18)
2008–2009	→ 1. FC Nürnberg	2	(0)
2010–2012	1. FC Saarbrücken	56	(13)
2012–2013	Eintracht Trier	12	(2)
- * Club domestic league appearances and goals as of 25 October 2013

Markus Fuchs (born 24 February 1980 in Rottweil) is a German football player. He made his debut on the professional league level in the 2. Bundesliga for 1. FC Nürnberg on 16 November 2008, when he came on as a substitute for Isaac Boakye in the 90th minute of a game against FC Ingolstadt 04.

== Honours ==
- Regionalliga West (IV): 2010
