= Martin Klarer =

German footballer

Personal information
- Full name: Martin Klarer
- Date of birth: 19 April 1982 (age 44)
- Place of birth: Ulm, West Germany
- Height: 1.83 m (6 ft 0 in)
- Position: Midfielder

Team information
- Current team: SC Staig (player-manager)

Youth career
- SSV Ulm
- 2000–2001: 1. FC Nürnberg

Senior career*
Years	Team	Apps	(Gls)
2001–2006	1. FC Nürnberg II		
2006–2007	FC Ingolstadt	15	(0)
2006–2007	FC Ingolstadt II		
2007–2012	1. FC Heidenheim	115	(9)
2013–2014	1. FC Heidenheim II	0	(0)
2016–	SC Staig	8	(0)

Managerial career
- 2013–2014: 1. FC Heidenheim II (assistant)
- 2017–: SC Staig
- * Club domestic league appearances and goals as of 00:50, 30 October 2018 (UTC)

Martin Klarer (born 19 April 1982) is a German footballer who plays as a midfielder for SC Staig, where he is also the manager.

== Playing career ==
Klarer made his professional debut in the 3. Liga for 1. FC Heidenheim on 25 July 2009, starting in the home match against Wuppertaler SV, which finished as a 2–2 draw.

== Managerial career ==
Klarer was the assistant manager for 1. FC Heidenheim II in the Oberliga Baden-Württemberg during the 2013–14 season. In 2017, he was appointed as the head coach of SC Staig, where he acts as a player-manager.
