= Joseph Olumide =

Nigerian footballer

Jo Olumide
Personal information
- Full name: Joseph Olumide
- Date of birth: 10 October 1987 (age 39)
- Place of birth: Lagos, Lagos State, Nigeria
- Height: 1.63 m (5 ft 4 in)
- Position: Striker

Team information
- Current team: VfR Mannheim II

Youth career
- VfB Gartenstadt

Senior career*
Years	Team	Apps	(Gls)
2004–2005	Waldhof Mannheim II	12	(9)
2005–2006	Waldhof Mannheim	0	(0)
2006	TuS Koblenz	2	(0)
2007	TSG Thannhausen	32	(18)
2008–2010	Hamburger SV II	34	(2)
2010–2011	Wacker Burghausen	11	(0)
2012	1. FC Normannia Gmünd	4	(1)
2012–2013	VfR Mannheim	20	(4)
2013–2014	SVN Zweibrücken	3	(0)
2014–2015	SV Wiesbaden	24	(2)
2015–2019	VfR Mannheim	97	(8)
2015–	VfR Mannheim II	15	(0)

Managerial career
- 2018–2019: SV 98/07 Seckenheim (assistant)
- 2019–: VfR Mannheim (assistant)
- * Club domestic league appearances and goals as of 11 February 2021

Joseph Olumide (born 10 October 1987) is a Nigerian footballer who plays for VfR Mannheim II.

== Club career ==
In 2006, Olumide made his professional debut for TuS Koblenz in the German Second Division.

He currently plays for SV Wiesbaden.
