= Daniel Bernhardt (footballer) =

German footballer

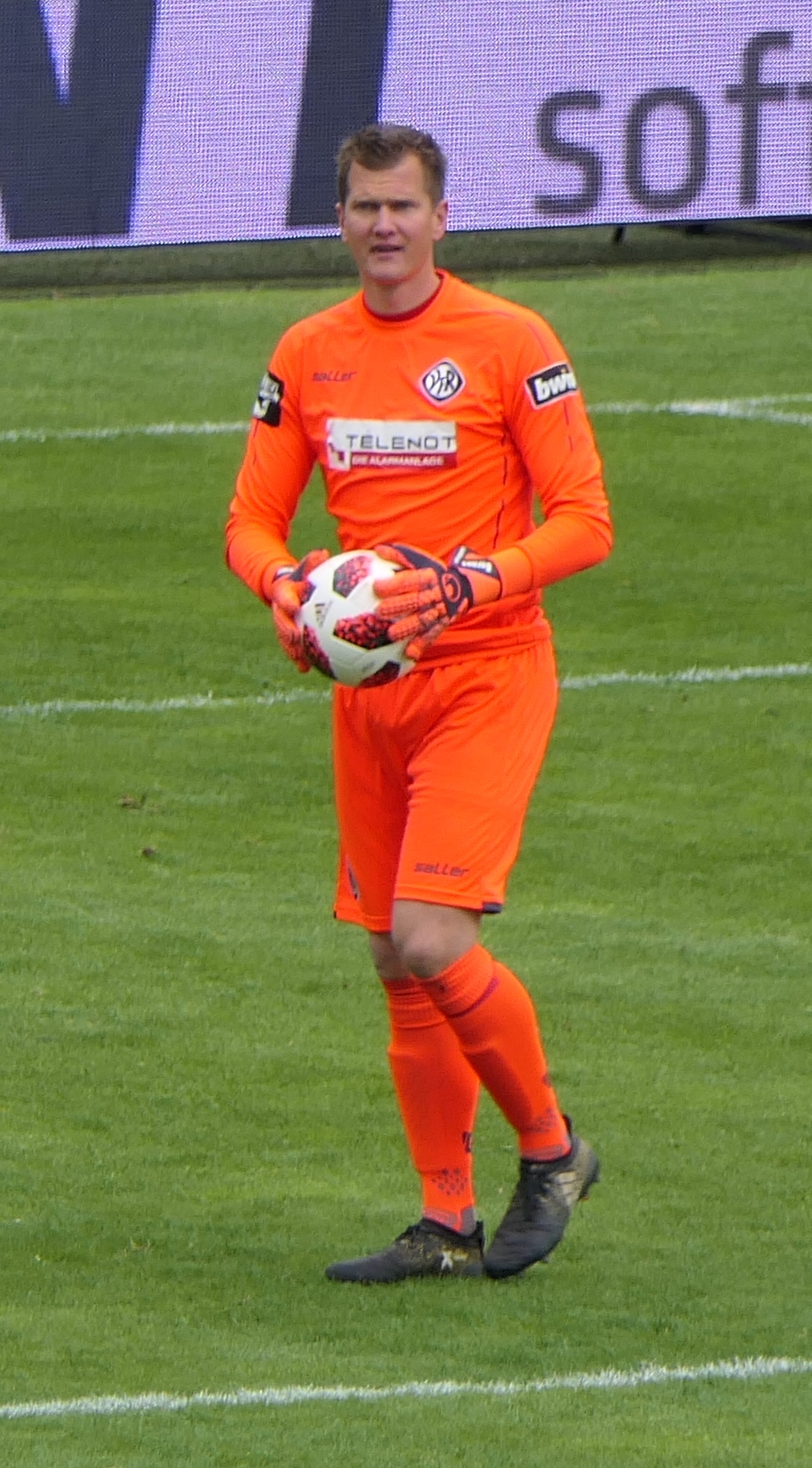

Personal information
- Date of birth: 21 August 1985 (age 41)
- Place of birth: Karlsruhe, West Germany
- Height: 6 ft 3 in (1.91 m)
- Position: Goalkeeper

Youth career
- FC Germania Friedrichstal
- –2006: ASV Durlach

Senior career*
Years	Team	Apps	(Gls)
2006–2009	TSG 1899 Hoffenheim II	55	(0)
2008–2009	TSG 1899 Hoffenheim	0	(0)
2009–2022	VfR Aalen	343	(0)
- * Club domestic league appearances and goals

Daniel Bernhardt (born 21 August 1985) is a German former footballer who played as a goalkeeper.
