= Stefan Haben =

German footballer

Personal information
- Date of birth: April 2, 1987 (age 39)
- Place of birth: Bendorf, West Germany
- Position: Central defender

Team information
- Current team: FC Karbach

Youth career
- FSV Mainz 05
- SV Niederwerth
- –2005: TuS Koblenz

Senior career*
Years	Team	Apps	(Gls)
2005–2006	TuS Koblenz	2	(0)
2006–2008	Birmingham-Southern		
2008–2009	SSV Reutlingen	32	(2)
2009–2010	Eintracht Frankfurt II	27	(0)
2010–2011	TuS Koblenz	33	(2)
2011–2012	Fortuna Köln	15	(1)
2012–2014	TuS Koblenz	73	(1)
2014–	FC Karbach	22	(3)
- * Club domestic league appearances and goals as of 24 June 2015

Stefan Haben (born April 2, 1987) is a German footballer who plays for FC Karbach.
