= Jörg Hahnel =

German footballer

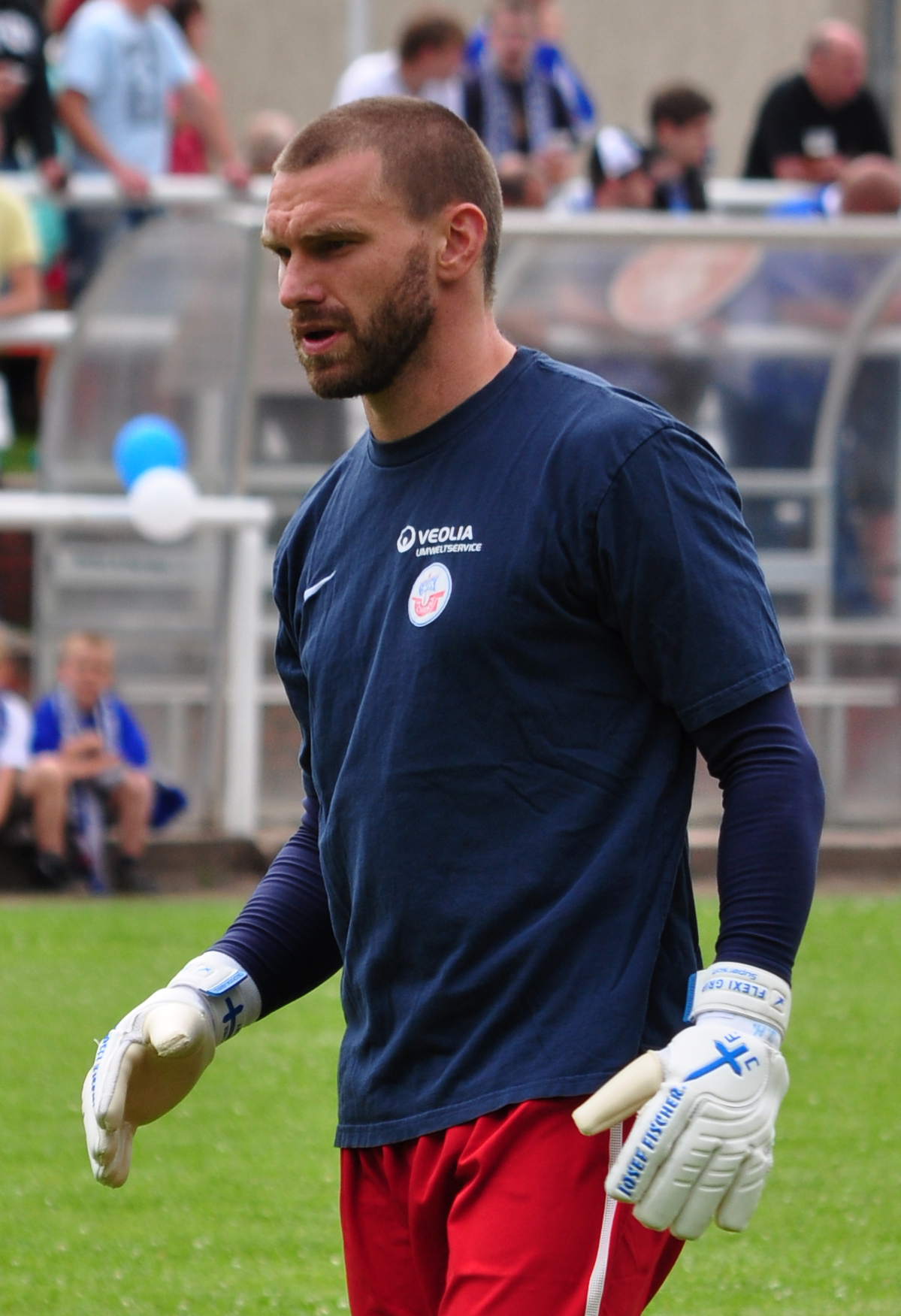
- Hahnel in 2012

Personal information
- Full name: Jörg Hahnel
- Date of birth: 11 January 1982 (age 44)
- Place of birth: Erla, East Germany
- Height: 1.86 m (6 ft 1 in)
- Position: Goalkeeper

Youth career
- 1987–1993: SV Eisen Erla-Crandorf
- 1993–2000: Erzgebirge Aue

Senior career*
Years	Team	Apps	(Gls)
2000–2006	Erzgebirge Aue	54	(0)
2006–2015	Hansa Rostock	114	(0)
2006–2013	Hansa Rostock II	24	(0)
2015–2017	FC Schönberg	76	(0)
2017–2018	Rostocker FC	28	(1)
2018–2019	Hansa Rostock II	15	(0)
Total		311	(1)

Managerial career
- 2017–2018: Rostocker FC (assistant)
- 2018–2019: Hansa Rostock II (assistant)
- * Club domestic league appearances and goals

Jörg Hahnel (born 11 January 1982 in Erla) is a German former professional footballer who played as a goalkeeper.
