= 2009–10 SV Werder Bremen II season =

Werder Bremen II
2009–10 season
Home colours	Away colours	Third colours

The 2009–10 SV Werder Bremen II season started on 25 July 2009 against Rot-Weiß Erfurt and finished on 8 May 2010 against Erzgebirge Aue.

== Season ==
=== Season review ===
==== July and August ====
The opening match of the season happened on 25 July 2009 against Rot-Weiß Erfurt. The match finished in a 0–0 draw. Matchday two happened on 28 July 2009 against VfL Osnabrück. Osnabrück won the match 1–0 with a goal from the penalty spot from Matthias Heidrich. Matchday three happened on 7 August 2009 against Borussia Dortmund II. Werder Bremen II won the match 1–0 with a goal from Torsten Oehrl. Matchday four happened on 15 August 2009 against Holstein Kiel. Holstein Kiel won the match 4–0 with three goals from Michael Holt and a goal from Fiete Sykora. Matchday five happened on 22 August 2009 against Wacker Burghausen. Wacker Burghausen won the match 4–3. Onur Ayık, Torsten Oehrl, and Pascal Testroet scored for Werder Bremen II. Wacker Burghausen got two goals from Christian Cappek and a goal each from Björn Hertl and Sven Kresin. Matchday six happened on 30 August 2010 against Eintracht Braunschweig. Werder Bremen II won the match 2–1. Pascal Testroet scored two goals for Werder Bremen II and Dennis Kruppke scored for Eintracht Braunschweig.

==== September and October ====
Matchday seven happened on 2 September 2009 against Jahn Regensburg. Jahn Regensburg won the match 1–0 with a goal from Anton Shynder. Matchday nine happened on 12 September 2009 against FC Ingolstadt 04. Ingolstadt won the match 4–1. Torsten Oehrl scored for Werder Bremen II. Ingolstadt got two goals from Stefan Leitl, and a goal each from Moritz Hartmann and Robert Braber. Matchday eight happened on 15 September 2009 against Kickers Offenbach. Kickers Offenbach won the match 1–0 with a goal from David Ulm. Matchday 10 happened on 19 September 2009 against SpVgg Unterhaching. Werder Bremen II won the match 3–1. Werder Bremen II got two goals from Onur Ayık and a goal from Nicolas Feldhahn. Ömer Kanca scored for Unterhaching. Felix Schiller was sent-off during the match. Matchday 11 happened on 26 September 2009 against Carl Zeiss Jena. The match finished in a 2–2 draw. Pascal Testroet scored two goals for Werder Bremen II. Orlando Smeekes and Salvatore Amirante scored for Carl Zeiss Jena. Matchday 12 happened on 3 October 2009 against Dynamo Dresden. Werder Bremen II won the match 2–0 with two goals from Torsten Oehrl. Matchday 13 happened on 17 October 2009 against 1. FC Heidenheim. Werder Bremen II won the match 2–1. Pascal Testroet scored two goals for Werder Bremen II. Dieter Jarosch scored for Heidenheim. Matchday 14 happened on 24 October 2009 against Wuppertaler SV. Wuppertal won the match 1–0 with a goal from Andrés Formento. Matchday 15 happened on 30 October 2009 against VfB Stuttgart II. Werder Bremen II won the match 1–0 with a goal from Onur Ayık.

==== November and December ====
Matchday 16 happened on 7 November 2009 against Wehen Wiesbaden. Werder Bremen II won the match 5–0 with two goals from Addy-Waku Menga and a goal each from Pascal Testroet, Stefan Ronneburg, and Onur Ayık. Matchday 17 happened on 21 November 2009 against SV Sandhausen. The match finished in a 2–2 draw. Addy-Waku Menga scored two goals for Werder Bremen II. Philipp Hosiner and Regis Dorn scored for Sandhausen. Matchday 18 happened on 29 November 2009 against Bayern Munich II. Bayern Munich II won the match 3–0 with two goals from Mehmet Ekici and a goal from Saër Sène. Matchday 19 happened on 5 December 2009 against Erzgebirge Aue. Erzgebirge Aue won the match 2–1. Torsten Oehrl scored for Werder Bremen II. Sebastian Glasner and Jan Hochscheidt scored for Erzgebirge Aue. Alexander Hessel was sent-off during the match. Matchday 20 happened on 12 December 2009 against Rot-Weiß Erfurt. The match finished in a 1–1 draw. Onur Ayık scored for Werder Bremen II and Petr Smíšek scored for Rot-Weiß Erfurt.

==== March ====
Matchday 23 happened on 3 March 2010 against Holstein Kiel. Werder Bremen II won the match 6–1. Matchday 27 happened on 6 March 2010 against Kickers Offenbach. Werder Bremen II got three goals from Onur Ayık and a goal each from Addy-Waku Menga, Kevin Artmann, and Lennart Thy. Michael Holt scored for Holstein Kiel. Kickers Offenbach won the match 4–0 with two goals from Steffen Haas and a goal each from Kai Hesse and Nils Pfingsten-Reddig. Matchday 22 happened on 10 March 2010 against Borussia Dortmund II. Werder Bremen II won the match 2–1. Tobias Kempe scored two goals for Werder Bremen II. Kempe's first goal was from the penalty spot. Uwe Hünemeier scored from the penalty spot for Burussia Dortmund II. Matchday 28 happened on 13 March 2010 against Ingolstadt. The match finished in a 0–0 draw. Matchday 21 happened on 16 March 2010 against Osnabrück. Osnabrück won the match 1–0 with a goal from Alexander Dercho. Matchday 21 happened on 21 March 2010 against Unterhaching. Werder Bremen II won the match 1–0 with a goal from Nicolas Feldhahn. Markus Schwabl was sent-off during the match. Matchday 24 happened on 24 March 2010 against Wacker Burghausen. The match finished in a 1–1 draw. Lennart Thy scored for Werder Bremen II and Christian Holzer scored for Wacker Burghausen. Matchday 30 happened on 28 March 2010 against Carl Zeiss Jena. Carl Zeiss Jena won the match 2–1. Kevin Artmann scored for Werder Bremen II. Orlando Smeekes and Melvin Holwijn scored for Carl Zeiss Jena. Márkó Futács was sent-off during the match. Matchday 31 happened on 31 March 2010 against Dynamo Dresden. Dynamo Dresden won the match 1–0 with a goal from Robert Koch.

==== April and May ====
Matchday 32 happened on 3 April 2010 against Heidenheim. The matchday finished in a 1–1 draw. Onur Ayık scored for Werder Bremen II and Andreas Spann scored for Heidenheim. Stefan Ronneburg was sent-off during the match. Matchday 25 happened on 7 April 2010 against Eintracht Braunschweig. Eintracht Braunschweig won the match 3–0 with goals from Deniz Doğan, Damir Vrančić, and Marco Calamita. Matchday 33 happened on 10 April 2010 against Wuppertal. The match finished in a 1–1 draw. Sandro Wagner scored for Werder Bremen II and Nermin Čeliković scored for Wuppertal. Matchday 34 happened on 13 April 2010 against Stuttgart II. Stuttgart II won the match 3–0 with goals from Tobias Rathgeb, who scored from the penalty spot, Julian Schieber, and Sven Schipplock. Matchday 35 happened on 17 April 2010 against Wehen Wiesbaden. Wehen Wiesbaden won the match 2–0 with goals from Dominik Stroh-Engel and Aykut Öztürk. Matchday 26 happened on 20 April 2010 against Jahn Regensburg. Werder Bremen II won the match 4–1. Werder Bremen II got three goals from Márkó Futács and a goal from Sandro Wagner. Petr Stoilov scored for Jahn Regensburg. Matchday 36 happened on 24 April 2010 against Sandhausen. Werder Bremen II won the match 3–0 with goals from Timo Perthel, Sandro Wagner, and Onur Ayık. Matchday 37 happened on 30 April 2010 against Bayern Munich II. Bayern Munich II won the match 2–1. Nicolas Feldhahn scored for Werder Bremen II. Deniz Yılmaz and Saër Sène scored for Bayern Munich II. Matchday 38 happened on 8 May 2010 against Erzgebirge Aue. Werder Bremen II won the match 2–1. Nicolas Feldhahn and Tobias Kempe scored for Werder Bremen II. Sebastian Glasner scored for Erzgebirge Aue.

=== Results summary ===
Overall								Home						Away					
Pld	W	D	L	GF	GA	GD	Pts	W	D	L	GF	GA	GD	W	D	L	GF	GA	GD
38	13	8	17	49	54	−5	47	8	3	8	31	23	+8	5	5	9	18	31	−13

Last updated: 26 June 2018.
Source: kicker.de

=== Results ===
MD	Date	H/A	Opponent	Res. F–A	Goalscorers		Ref.
MD	Date	H/A	Opponent	Res. F–A	Werder Bremen II	Opponent	Ref.
1	25 Jul.	H	Rot-Weiß Erfurt	0–0	—	—	
2	28 Jul.	A	Osnabrück	0–1	—	Heidrich 67' (pen.)	
3	7 Aug.	H	Borussia Dortmund II	1–0	Oehrl 52'	—	
4	15 Aug.	A	Holstein Kiel	0–4	—	Holt 2', 40', 46'; Sykora 76'	
5	22 Aug.	H	Wacker Burghausen	3–4	Ayik 12'; Oehrl 13' (pen.); Testroet 67'	Cappek 5', 60'; Hertl 29'; Kresin 51' (pen.)	
6	30 Aug.	A	Eintracht Braunschweig	2–1	Testroet 19', 87'	Kruppke 32'	
7	2 Sep.	A	Jahn Regensburg	0–1	—	Shynder 66'	
9	12 Sep.	A	Ingolstadt	1–4	Oehrl 2'	Leitl 3', 66' (pen.); Hartmann 62'; Braber 70'	
8	15 Sep.	H	Kickers Offenbach	0–1	—	Ulm 37'	
10	19 Sep.	H	Unterhaching	3–1	Feldhahn 5'; Ayik 88', 90'+2'	Kanca 86'	
11	26 Sep.	A	Carl Zeiss Jena	2–2	Testroet 32', 80'	Smeekes 52'; Amirante 82' (pen.)	
12	3 Oct.	H	Dynamo Dresden	2–0	Oehrl 21', 48' (pen.)	—	
13	17 Oct.	A	Heidenheim	2–1	Testroet 45', 57'	Jarosch 82' (pen.)	
14	24 Oct.	H	Wuppertal	0–1	—	Formento 40'	
15	30 Oct.	A	Stuttgart II	1–0	Ayik 73'	—	
16	7 Nov.	H	Wehen Wiesbaden	5–0	Testroet 17'; Ronneburg 20'; Ayik 39'; Menga 41', 66'	—	
17	21 Nov.	A	Sandhausen	2–2	Menga 63', 77'	Hosiner 75'; Dorn 79'	
18	29 Nov.	H	Bayern Munich II	0–3	—	Ekici 14', 19' (pen.); Sène 78'	
19	5 Dec.	A	Erzgebirge Aue	1–2	Oehrl 76' (pen.)	Glasner 2'; Hochscheidt 17'	
20	12 Dec.	A	Rot-Weiß Erfurt	1–1	Ayik 25'	Smíšek 85'	
23	3 Mar.	H	Holstein Kiel	6–1	Ayik 10', 16', 61'; Menga 23'; Artmann 73'; Thy 87'	Holt 40'	
27	6 Mar.	A	Kickers Offenbach	0–4	—	Hesse 10'; Haas 12', 77'; Pfingsten-Reddig 81'	
22	10 Mar.	A	Borussia Dortmund II	2–1	Kempe 57' (pen.), 84'	Hünemeier 61' (pen.)	
28	13 Mar.	H	Ingolstadt	0–0	—	—	
21	16 Mar.	H	Osnabrück	0–1	—	Dercho 65'	
29	21 Mar.	A	Unterhaching	1–0	Feldhahn 70'	—	
24	24 Mar.	A	Wacker Burghausen	1–1	Thy 78'	Holzer 35'	
30	28 Mar.	H	Carl Zeiss Jena	1–2	Artman 42'	Smeekes 49'; Holwijn 86'	
31	31 Mar.	A	Dynamo Dresden	0–1	—	Koch 51'	
32	3 Apr.	H	Heidenheim	1–1	Ayik 34'	Spann 58'	
25	7 Apr.	H	Eintracht Braunschweig	0–3	—	Doğan 13'; Vrančić 31'; Calamita 64'	
33	10 Apr.	A	Wuppertal	1–1	Wagner 78'	Čeliković 88'	
34	13 Apr.	H	Stuttgart II	0–3	—	Rathgeb 21' (pen.); Schieber 27'; Schipplock 61'	
35	17 Apr.	A	Wehen Wiesbaden	0–2	—	Stroh-Engel 14'; Öztürk 23'	
26	20 Apr.	H	Jahn Regensburg	4–1	Wagner 50'; Futács 65', 81', 87'	Stoilov 4'	
36	24 Apr.	H	Sandhausen	3–0	Perthel 68'; Wagner 76'; Ayik 88'	—	
37	30 Apr.	A	Bayern Munich II	1–2	Feldhahn 48'	Yılmaz 18' (pen.); Sène 52'	
38	8 May	H	Erzgebirge Aue	2–1	Feldhahn 34'; Kempe 77'	Glasner 71'	

== Squad statistics ==
Name	App	Goals	Booked	(yellow card) (red card)	Sent off (straight red)	Ref.
Goalkeepers
Michael Jürgen	1	0	0	0	0	
Sebastian Mielitz	19	0	0	0	0	
Sebastian Patzler	3	0	0	0	0	
Felix Wiedwald	15	0	1	0	0	
Defenders
Niklas Andersen	22	0	9	0	0	
Nicolas Feldhahn	35	4	8	0	0	
Alexander Hessel	13	0	4	0	1	
Jannik Löhden	6	0	2	0	0	
Kevin Maek	22	0	4	0	0	
Timo Perthel	27	1	4	0	0	
Sebastian Prödl	1	0	0	0	0	
Felix Schiller	23	0	4	0	1	
Dominik Schmidt	22	0	9	0	0	
Sandro Stallbaum	36	0	6	0	0	
Midfielders
Madjid Albry	1	0	0	0	0	
Kevin Artmann	9	2	1	0	0	
Ralf Bulang	3	0	1	0	0	
Bernd Gerdes	30	0	4	0	0	
José-Alex Ikeng	4	0	0	0	0	
Tobias Kempe	34	3	4	0	0	
Stefan Ronneburg	29	1	7	0	1	
Florian Trinks	1	0	0	0	0	
Serhan Zengin	13	0	0	0	0	
Forwards
Onur Ayık	30	11	4	0	0	
Márkó Futács	13	3	3	0	1	
Lefteris Matsoukas	4	0	0	0	0	
Addy-Waku Menga	26	5	2	0	0	
Torsten Oehrl	17	6	3	0	0	
Pascal Testroet	17	8	2	0	0	
Timmy Thiele	1	0	0	0	0	
Lennart Thy	13	2	1	0	0	
Sandro Wagner	7	3	1	0	0	
