= 2010–11 SV Werder Bremen II season =

Werder Bremen II
2010–11 season
- Head Coach: Thomas Wolter

The 2010–11 SV Werder Bremen II season took place between 24 July 2010 and 14 May 2011.

== Season ==
=== Overview ===
==== July, August, and September ====
Werder Bremen II's season started on 24 July 2010 against Jahn Regensburg. Jahn Regensburg won 1–0 with a goal from Mahmut Temür. The second match took place on 31 July 2010 against Rot Weiss Ahlen. The match finished in a 1–1 draw. Lennart Thy scored for Werder Bremen II and Marcus Piossek scored for Rot Weiss Ahlen.

The third match happened on 3 August 2010 against VfR Aalen. The match finished in a 1–1 draw. Kevin Maek scored for Werder Bremen II and Tim Bauer scored from the penalty mark for Aalen. The fourth match happened on 7 August 2010 against Rot-Weiß Erfurt. Rot-Weiß Erfurt won the match 2–1. John Thöle scored for Werder Bremen II. Martin Hauswald and Martin Pohl scored for Rot-Weiß Erfurt. Dominik Schmidt of Werder Bremen II was sent-off after a second yellow card. The fifth match happened on 21 August 2010 against Hansa Rostock. Hansa Rostock won the match 2–0 with two goals from Radovan Vujanović. The sixth match happened on 27 August 2010 against TuS Koblenz. The match finished in a 0–0 draw.

The seventh match happened on 11 September 2010 against VfB Stuttgart II. Werder Bremen II won the match 3–0 with goals from Yannis Becker; Felix Kroos, who scored from the penalty spot; and Lennart Thy. The eighth match happened on 17 September 2010 against SpVgg Unterhaching. Unterhaching won the match 3–1. Leon Balogun scored for Werder Bremen II. Unterhaching got goals from Leandro, who scored from the penalty spot, Torben Hoffmann and Mijo Tunjić. The ninth match happened on 21 September 2010 against SV Babelsberg 03. Babelsberg won the match 2–0 with two goals from Dominik Stroh-Engel. The 10th match happened on 25 September 2010 against Wacker Burghausen. The match finished in a 1–1 draw. Henning Grieneisen scored for Werder Bremen II and Björn Hertl scored for Wacker Burghausen. Felix Kroos was sent-off during the match.

==== October, November, and December ====
The 11th match happened on 2 October 2010 against Kickers Offenbach. Kickers Offenbach won 3–1. Pascal Testroet scored for Werder Bremen II. Kickers Offenbach got two goals from Kai Hesse and a goal from Denis Berger. The 12th match happened on 15 October 2010 against Eintracht Braunschweig. Eintracht Braunschweig won 5–0 with goals from Dennis Kruppke, Mirko Boland, Domi Kumbela, Karim Bellarabi, and Matthias Henn. The 13th match happened on 23 October 2010 against Carl Zeiss Jena. The match finished in a 1–1 draw. Kevin Krisch scored for Werder Bremen II and Josip Landeka scored for Carl Zeiss Jena. The 14th match happened on 30 October 2010 against 1. FC Heidenheim. Heidenheim won 1–0 with a goal from Richard Weil.

The 15th match happened on 6 November 2010 against Dynamo Dresden. The match finished in a 1–1 draw. Felix Kroos scored for Werder Bremen II and Alexander Esswein scored for Dynamo Dresden. Onur Ayık and Stefan Ronneburg, both who played for Werder Bremen II, were sent-off during the match. The 16th match happened on 14 November 2010 against 1. FC Saarbrücken. Werder Bremen II won 2–0 with goals from Pascal Testroet and Lennart Thy. Saarbrücken's Velimir Grgić was sent-off during the match. The 17th match took place on 20 November 2010 against SV Sandhausen. Sandhausen won 5–1. Pascal Testroet scored for Werder Bremen II. Sandhausen got two goals from the penalty spot from Roberto Pinto and a goal each from Tim Danneberg, Regis Dorn, and Roland Benschneider. The 18th match took place on 26 November 2010 against Bayern Munich II. Werder Bremen II won 2–0 with goals from Lennart Thy and Pascal Testroet.

The 19th match took place on 4 December 2010 against Wehen Wiesbaden. The match finished in a 1–1 draw. Lennart Thy scored for Werder Bremen II and Steffen Bohl scored for Wehen Wiesbaden. Werder Bremen II had a 52 day break after the match and didn't have another match until 25 January 2011.

==== January, February, and March ====
The 20th match happened on 25 January 2011 against Rot Weiss Ahlen. Werder Bremen II won the match 3–1. Werder Bremen II got a goal from the penalty spot from Felix Kroos and goals from Sandro Wagner and Pascal Testroet. Matthew Taylor scored for Rot Weiss Ahlen. The 21st match happened on 29 January 2011 against Aalen. The match finished in a 1–1 draw. Kevin Maek scored for Werder Bremen II and Ralf Kettemann scored for Aalen.

The 22nd match happened on 5 February 2011 against Rot-Weiß Erfurt. Rot-Weiß Erfurt won 2–1. Olivier Caillas scored an own goal for Werder Bremen II. Rot-Weiß Erfurt got a goal from Olivier Caillas and a goal from the penalty spot from Nils Pfingsten-Reddig. The 23rd match happened on 12 February 2011 against Hansa Rostock. Hansa Rostock won 2–0 with goals from Mohammed Lartey and Radovan Vujanović. The 24th match happened on 16 February 2011 against Jahn Regensburg. Werder Bremen II won 2–0 with a goal from Pascal Testroet and a goal from the penalty spot from Felix Kroos. The 25th match happened on 19 February 2011 against Koblenz. Koblenz won 2–0 with goals from André Hahn and Manuel Hornig. The 26th match happened on 26 February 2011 against Stuttgart II. The match finished in a 1–1 draw. Kevin Artmann scored for Werder Bremen II and Alexander Aschauer scored for Stuttgart II. Kevin Maek was sent-off during the match.

The 27th match happened on 5 March 2011 against Unterhaching. Unterhaching won 2–0 with goals from Markus Schwabl and Abdenour Amachaibou. The 28th match happened on 11 March 2011 against Babelsberg. Werder Bremen II won 1–0 with a goal from Stefan Ronneburg. The 29th match happened on 19 March 2011 against Wacker Burghausen. Wacker Burghausen won 2–1. Kevin Schindler scored for Werder Bremen II. Darlington Omodiagbe and Christian Holzer scored for Wacker Burghausen.

==== April and May ====
The 30th match happened on 1 April 2011 against Kickers Offenbach. The match finished in a 0–0 draw. The 31st match happened on 6 April 2011 against Eintracht Braunschweig. Werder Bremen II won 2–1. Predrag Stevanović scored two goals for Werder Bremen II. Domi Kumbela scored from the penalty spot for Eintracht Braunschweig. The 32nd match happened on 9 April 2011 against Carl Zeiss Jena. The match finished in a 0–0 draw. The 33rd match happened on 16 April 2011 against Heidenheim. Heidenheim won 3–1. Predrag Stevanović scored from the penalty spot for Werder Bremen II. Heidenheim got two goals from Bastian Heidenfelder and a goal from Marc Schnatterer. Heidenheim's Tim Göhlert was sent-off during the match. The 34th match happened on 19 April 2011 against Dynamo Dresden. Dynamo Dresden won 3–0 with goals from Dani Schahin, Alexander Esswein, and Florian Grossert. The 35th match happened on 23 April 2011 against Saarbrücken. Saarbrücken won 1–0 with a goal from Stephan Sieger. The 36th match happened on 30 April 2011 against Sandhausen. The match finished in a 1–1 draw. Felix Kroos scored from the penalty spot for Werder Bremen II and Stefan Zinnow scored for Sandhausen.

The 37th match happened on 7 May 2011 against Bayern Munich II. Werder Bremen II won 1–0 with a goal from the penalty spot from Felix Kroos. The 38th and final match happened on 14 May 2011 against Wehen Wiesbaden. Wehen Wiesbaden won 4–1. Kevin Maek scored from the penalty spot for Werder Bremen II. Francis Kioyo, Addy-Waku Menga, Alf Mintzel, and Zlatko Janjić scored for Wehen Wiesbaden. Werder Bremen II finished the season in 18th place and avoided relegation by six points.

=== Results summary ===
Overall								Home						Away					
Pld	W	D	L	GF	GA	GD	Pts	W	D	L	GF	GA	GD	W	D	L	GF	GA	GD
38	8	12	18	33	56	−23	36	4	6	9	15	28	−13	4	6	9	18	28	−10

Last updated: 15 September 2018.
Source: kicker.de

=== Results ===
Date	H/A	Opponent	Res. F–A	Goalscorers		Ref.
Date	H/A	Opponent	Res. F–A	Werder Bremen II	Opponent	Ref.
24 July	H	Jahn Regensburg	0–1	—	Temür 36'	
31 July	A	Rot Weiss Ahlen	1–1	Thy 43'	Piossek 6'	
3 August	H	Aalen	1–1	Maek 13'	Bauer 89' (pen.)	
7 August	A	Rot-Weiß Erfurt	1–2	Thöle 75'	Hauswald 13'; Pohl 82'	
21 August	H	Hansa Rostock	0–2	—	Vujanović 18', 28'	
27 August	A	Koblenz	0–0	—	—	
11 September	A	Stuttgart II	3–0	Becker 3'; Kroos 62' (pen.); Thy 90'+2'	—	
17 September	H	Unterhaching	1–3	Balogun 58'	Leandro 62' (pen.); Hoffmann 72'; Tunjić 79'	
21 September	A	Babelsberg	0–2	—	Stroh-Engel 7', 54'	
25 September	H	Wacker Burghausen	1–1	Grieneisen 52'	Hertl 19'	
2 October	A	Kickers Offenbach	1–3	Testroet 11'	Berger 51'; Hesse 56', 65'	
15 October	H	Eintracht Braunschweig	0–5	—	Kruppke 3'; Boland 30'; Kumbela 33' (pen.); Bellarabi 40'; Henn 52'	
23 October	A	Carl Zeiss Jena	1–1	Krisch 41'	Landeka 12'	
30 October	H	Heidenheim	0–1	—	Weil 11'	
6 November	A	Dynamo Dresden	1–1	Kroos 8'	Esswein 70'	
14 November	H	Saarbrücken	2–0	Testroet 2'; Thy 4'	—	
20 November	A	Sandhausen	1–5	Testroet 17'	Danneberg 30'; Dorn 47'; Pinto 58' (pen.), 79' (pen.); Benschneider 62'	
26 November	H	Bayern Munich II	2–0	Thy 28'; Testroet 29'	—	
4 December	A	Wehen Wiesbaden	1–1	Thy 66'	Bohl 60'	
25 January	H	Rot Weiss Ahlen	3–1	Kroos 39' (pen.); Wagner 80'; Testroet 89'	Taylor 45'	
29 January	A	Aalen	1–1	Maek 40'	Kettemann 30'	
5 February	H	Rot-Weiß Erfurt	1–2	Caillas 35' (o.g.)	Caillas 19'; Pfingsten-Reddig 59' (pen.)	
12 February	A	Hansa Rostock	0–2	—	Lartey 65'; Vujanović 72'	
16 February	A	Jahn Regensburg	2–0	Testroet 13'; Kroos 60' (pen.)	—	
19 February	H	Koblenz	0–2	—	Hahn 54'; Hornig 73'	
26 February	H	Stuttgart II	1–1	Artmann 20'	Aschauer 60'	
5 March	A	Unterhaching	0–2	—	Schwabl 25'; Amachaibou 27'	
11 March	H	Babelsberg	1–0	Ronneburg 88'	—	
19 March	A	Wacker Burghausen	1–2	Schindler 34'	Omodiagbe 58'; Holzer 87'	
1 April	H	Kickers Offenbach	0–0	—	—	
6 April	A	Eintracht Braunschweig	2–1	Stevanović 43', 90'+1'	Kumbela 51' (pen.)	
9 April	H	Carl Zeiss Jena	0–0	—	—	
16 April	A	Heidenheim	1–3	Stevanović 81' (pen.)	Schnatterer 19'; Heidenfelder 42', 68'	
19 April	H	Dynamo Dresden	0–3	—	Schahin 26'; Esswein 51'; Grossert 62'	
23 April	A	Saarbrücken	0–1	—	Sieger 66'	
30 April	H	Sandhausen	1–1	Kroos 37' (pen.)	Zinnow 3'	
7 May	A	Bayern Munich II	1–0	Kroos 43' (pen.)	—	
14 May	H	Wehen Wiesbaden	1–4	Maek 45'	Kioyo 16'; Menga 76'; Mintzel 80'; Janjić 89'	

== Squad statistics ==
Name	App	Goals	Booked	(yellow card) (red card)	Sent off (straight red)	Ref.
Goalkeepers
Tobias Duffner	4	0	0	0	0	
Sebastian Mielitz	2	0	0	0	0	
Sebastian Patzler	1	0	0	0	0	
Christian Vander	7	0	1	0	0	
Felix Wiedwald	24	0	0	0	0	
Defenders
Niklas Andersen	12	0	3	0	0	
Leon Balogun	29	1	0	0	0	
Yannis Becker	16	1	3	0	0	
Alexander Hessel	24	0	4	0	0	
Jannik Löhden	3	0	0	0	0	
Kevin Maek	30	3	4	0	1	
Marcus Mlynikowski	2	0	0	0	0	
Timo Perthel	4	0	2	0	0	
Felix Schiller	12	0	0	0	0	
Dominik Schmidt	12	0	7	1	0	
Clemens Schoppenhauer	14	0	5	0	0	
Sandro Stallbaum	37	0	6	0	0	
Midfielders
Kevin Artmann	16	1	2	0	0	
Onur Ayık	18	0	2	0	1	
Bernd Gerdes	20	0	1	0	0	
Henning Grieneisen	19	1	1	0	0	
José-Alex Ikeng	13	0	4	0	0	
Kevin Krisch	20	1	2	0	0	
Felix Kroos	21	6	4	0	1	
Florian Nagel	18	0	2	0	0	
Stefan Ronneburg	21	1	2	1	0	
Kevin Schindler	10	1	0	0	0	
Predrag Stevanović	10	3	1	0	0	
Thorsten Tönnies	1	0	1	0	0	
Florian Trinks	6	0	0	0	0	
Özkan Yıldırım	1	0	0	0	0	
Forwards
Denni Avdić	1	0	0	0	0	
Liam Boyce	3	0	2	0	0	
Pascal Testroet	31	6	2	0	0	
Timmy Thiele	16	0	0	0	0	
John Thöle	6	1	2	0	0	
Lennart Thy	35	5	3	0	0	
Sandro Wagner	2	1	1	0	0	
