= 2009–10 3. Liga =

2nd season of the 3. Liga

3. Liga
- Season: 2009–10
- Champions: Osnabrück
- Promoted: Osnabrück; Erzgebirge Aue
- Relegated: Borussia Dortmund II; Wuppertal; Holstein Kiel
- Matches: 380
- Goals: 1,023 (2.69 per match)
- Top goalscorer: Régis Dorn (22)
- Biggest home win: CZ Jena 6–0 Bayern II; Ingolstadt 6–0 Burghausen
- Biggest away win: Bayern II 0–5 Regensburg
- Highest scoring: Wuppertal 5–3 Kiel; Wuppertal 5–3 Bayern II

The 2009–10 3. Liga season was the second season for the newly formed tier III of the German football league system. The season began on 25 July 2009 and ended on 8 May 2010.

== Team changes from 2008–09 ==
=== Exchange between 2. Bundesliga and 3. Liga ===
2008–09 3. Liga champions 1. FC Union Berlin and runners-up Fortuna Düsseldorf were directly promoted to the 2. Bundesliga. They were replaced by FC Ingolstadt 04 and SV Wehen Wiesbaden, who finished in the bottom two places after the previous season.

Third-placed team SC Paderborn 07 were also promoted after defeating the 16th-placed team from last year's 2nd Bundesliga, VfL Osnabrück, in a relegation playoff. As a result, Osnabrück would play in 3. Liga.

=== Exchange between 3. Liga and Regionalliga ===
VfR Aalen and Stuttgarter Kickers were relegated after finishing the 2008–09 season in the bottom two places. 18th-placed SV Wacker Burghausen were eventually spared from relegation after 5th-placed Kickers Emden voluntarily retracted their application for a license because of financial issues. Emden will play in the fifth-tier Oberliga Niedersachsen.

The three relegated teams were replaced by the champions of the three Regionalliga divisions, Holstein Kiel (North), Borussia Dortmund II (West) and 1. FC Heidenheim 1846 (South).

== Team overview ==
=== Stadia and locations ===
Location of (qualified) teams in 2009–10 3. Fußball-Liga

Team	Location	Venue	Capacity
FC Bayern Munich II	Munich	Stadion an der Grünwalder Straße	10,200
Borussia Dortmund II	Dortmund	Stadion Rote Erde	25,000
FC Carl Zeiss Jena	Jena	Ernst-Abbe-Sportfeld	12,750
Dynamo Dresden	Dresden	Rudolf-Harbig-Stadion	32,296
Eintracht Braunschweig	Braunschweig	Eintracht-Stadion	23,500
FC Erzgebirge Aue	Aue	Erzgebirgsstadion	16,397
1. FC Heidenheim 1846	Heidenheim	Gagfah-Arena	10,000
Holstein Kiel	Kiel	Holstein-Stadion	11,386
FC Ingolstadt 04	Ingolstadt	Tuja-Stadion	11,418
SSV Jahn Regensburg	Regensburg	Jahnstadion	11,800
Kickers Offenbach	Offenbach am Main	Stadion am Bieberer Berg	26,500
VfL Osnabrück	Osnabrück	Osnatel-Arena	16,125
FC Rot-Weiß Erfurt	Erfurt	Steigerwaldstadion	17,500
SV Sandhausen	Sandhausen	Hardtwald	10,231
VfB Stuttgart II	Stuttgart	GAZi-Stadion auf der Waldau	11,436
SpVgg Unterhaching	Unterhaching	Generali Sportpark	15,053
SV Wacker Burghausen	Burghausen	Wacker-Arena	10,000
SV Wehen Wiesbaden	Wiesbaden	BRITA-Arena	13,144
SV Werder Bremen II	Bremen	Weserstadion Platz 11	5,500
Wuppertaler SV Borussia	Wuppertal	Stadion am Zoo	23,067

=== Managerial changes ===
Team	Outgoing manager	Manner of departure	Date of vacancy	Replaced by	Date of appointment	Position in table
VfL Osnabrück	(Germany) Claus-Dieter Wollitz	FC Energie Cottbus purchased rights	30 June 2009	(Germany) Karsten Baumann	1 July 2009	Pre-Season
FC Carl Zeiss Jena	(Germany) Marc Fascher	End of contract	30 June 2009	(Netherlands) René van Eck	1 July 2009	Pre-Season
FC Rot-Weiß Erfurt	(Germany) Henri Fuchs	End of tenure as caretaker	30 June 2009	(Germany) Rainer Hörgl	1 July 2009	Pre-Season
VfB Stuttgart II	(Germany) Rainer Adrion	New coach of Germany U-21	30 June 2009	(Germany) Reiner Geyer	1 July 2009	Pre-Season
SV Wacker Burghausen	(Germany) Ralf Santelli	End of contract	30 June 2009	(Germany) Jürgen Press	1 July 2009	Pre-Season

== League table ==
Pos	Team	Pld	W	D	L	GF	GA	GD	Pts	Promotion, qualification or relegation
1	VfL Osnabrück (C, P)	38	20	9	9	55	37	+18	69	Promotion to 2. Bundesliga and qualification for DFB-Pokal
2	Erzgebirge Aue (P)	38	20	8	10	57	41	+16	68	Promotion to 2. Bundesliga and qualification for DFB-Pokal
3	FC Ingolstadt (P)	38	18	10	10	72	46	+26	64	Qualification to promotion play-offs and DFB-Pokal
4	Eintracht Braunschweig	38	17	11	10	55	37	+18	62	Qualification for DFB-Pokal
5	Carl Zeiss Jena	38	16	12	10	54	44	+10	60	
6	1. FC Heidenheim	38	17	8	13	66	56	+10	59	
7	Kickers Offenbach	38	15	12	11	55	35	+20	57	
8	Bayern Munich II (Note: Reserve teams are ineligible for promotion or DFB-Pokal qualification.)	38	15	9	14	55	65	−10	54	
9	Rot-Weiß Erfurt	38	14	11	13	41	41	0	53	
10	VfB Stuttgart II	38	16	4	18	53	50	+3	52	
11	SpVgg Unterhaching	38	13	11	14	52	52	0	50	
12	Dynamo Dresden	38	14	8	16	39	46	−7	50	
13	Werder Bremen II	38	13	8	17	49	54	−5	47	
14	SV Sandhausen	38	11	14	13	54	63	−9	47	
15	Wehen Wiesbaden	38	13	8	17	52	64	−12	47	
16	Jahn Regensburg	38	11	13	14	43	48	−5	46	
17	Wacker Burghausen	38	13	7	18	45	64	−19	46	
18	Borussia Dortmund II (R)	38	11	6	21	43	58	−15	39	Relegation to Regionalliga
19	Holstein Kiel (R)	38	9	11	18	43	61	−18	38	Relegation to Regionalliga
20	Wuppertaler SV (R)	38	10	8	20	40	61	−21	38	Relegation to Regionalliga

Source: kicker(in German)
Rules for classification: 1) points; 2) goal difference; 3) number of goals scored.
(C) Champions; (P) Promoted; (R) Relegated

== Results ==
Home \ Away	AUE	EBS	BR2	WBU	DO2	SGD	ERF	FCH	FCI	JEN	KSV	MU2	KOF	OSN	JRE	SVS	ST2	UNT	WEH	WUP
Erzgebirge Aue	—	2–1	2–1	3–0	2–2	2–0	2–0	0–1	1–0	0–0	3–1	2–0	4–2	3–0	3–1	3–1	1–0	2–0	2–2	1–0
Eintracht Braunschweig	3–0	—	1–2	1–0	1–2	0–1	1–1	1–1	2–1	2–1	2–1	3–1	0–0	1–0	1–0	6–0	4–3	1–0	3–1	3–0
Werder Bremen II	2–1	0–3	—	3–4	1–0	2–0	0–0	1–1	0–0	1–2	6–1	0–3	0–1	0–1	4–1	3–0	0–3	3–1	5–0	0–1
Wacker Burghausen	0–2	0–2	1–1	—	4–3	2–0	1–3	1–3	4–2	2–3	0–3	2–1	1–0	0–1	1–1	5–2	3–0	3–0	2–0	1–0
Borussia Dortmund II	1–3	0–0	1–2	3–0	—	1–0	1–0	1–1	0–1	0–3	1–0	0–2	0–0	1–2	2–0	2–1	1–2	1–2	1–1	2–0
Dynamo Dresden	3–0	1–1	1–0	1–0	3–2	—	1–0	4–3	2–0	0–3	3–0	2–0	2–4	0–0	0–2	0–3	0–1	0–2	3–1	3–2
Rot-Weiß Erfurt	0–0	2–1	1–1	1–1	1–0	4–1	—	1–2	2–1	0–3	0–0	2–0	0–2	2–0	0–0	1–0	0–1	1–1	1–2	1–0
1. FC Heidenheim	0–0	0–1	1–2	6–1	2–1	3–0	2–2	—	0–1	3–1	3–0	4–2	0–2	1–0	3–2	1–0	2–1	2–4	0–2	2–2
FC Ingolstadt	5–1	3–3	4–1	6–0	0–1	0–0	5–0	4–3	—	2–2	1–0	2–0	1–0	0–0	2–2	1–1	1–1	2–2	5–1	0–2
Carl Zeiss Jena	1–0	2–1	2–2	0–0	2–1	0–4	0–3	1–2	2–0	—	3–0	6–0	0–0	1–1	3–1	0–1	1–2	1–1	2–1	1–0
Holstein Kiel	2–1	1–1	4–0	0–1	4–3	1–0	1–2	1–0	2–2	0–1	—	2–2	0–0	1–1	1–0	0–0	2–0	2–2	1–1	1–1
Bayern Munich II	2–3	1–1	2–1	2–0	3–0	0–0	1–0	4–2	1–0	0–0	2–1	—	2–1	1–1	0–5	2–2	2–0	1–1	0–0	3–1
Kickers Offenbach	0–0	3–0	4–0	3–0	1–2	1–0	0–0	2–1	0–1	4–0	2–3	4–1	—	2–0	0–0	3–3	2–0	1–3	3–0	0–1
VfL Osnabrück	3–1	1–0	1–0	2–1	4–1	1–1	3–1	3–2	5–2	2–0	3–1	4–1	1–0	—	1–0	3–1	0–1	1–0	0–0	1–1
Jahn Regensburg	2–1	1–0	1–0	0–0	2–0	2–0	0–2	2–2	0–2	1–1	2–0	1–1	1–1	2–2	—	1–1	0–0	1–3	0–3	1–0
SV Sandhausen	0–0	1–1	2–2	0–0	3–2	0–0	1–2	3–0	1–2	2–2	1–1	4–2	1–1	3–2	2–1	—	2–1	3–1	2–1	1–3
VfB Stuttgart II	1–2	1–2	0–1	1–0	2–1	2–2	3–1	1–1	2–4	0–1	1–0	2–4	2–0	0–1	2–3	3–0	—	3–1	3–0	1–3
SpVgg Unterhaching	2–2	2–0	0–1	1–1	1–1	0–0	1–1	0–2	1–2	3–1	3–1	0–1	1–2	1–0	2–0	3–3	1–0	—	4–3	1–0
Wehen Wiesbaden	2–0	0–0	2–0	3–1	2–0	0–1	2–0	1–2	1–5	1–1	2–1	1–2	3–3	4–0	0–2	2–1	1–4	2–1	—	2–3
Wuppertaler SV Borussia	0–2	1–1	1–1	1–2	0–2	1–0	0–3	1–2	0–2	1–1	5–3	5–3	1–1	0–4	2–2	0–2	0–3	1–0	0–2	—

Source: DFB
Legend: Blue = home team win; Yellow = draw; Red = away team win.

== Top goalscorers ==
Source: Kicker magazine (in German)

22 goals

- (France) Régis Dorn (SV Sandhausen)

21 goals

- (Germany) Moritz Hartmann (FC Ingolstadt 04)

17 goals

- (Netherlands Antilles) Orlando (FC Carl Zeiss Jena)

15 goals

- (Germany) Dennis Kruppke (Eintracht Braunschweig)
- (Germany) Andreas Spann (1. FC Heidenheim)

14 goals

- (Germany) Michael Holt (Holstein Kiel)
- (Germany) Sven Schipplock (VfB Stuttgart II)
- (Germany) Tobias Schweinsteiger (SpVgg Unterhaching)

13 goals

- (Germany) Carsten Kammlott (FC Rot-Weiß Erfurt)
- (Turkey) Deniz Yılmaz (FC Bayern Munich II)

== Player of the month ==
- August: (Germany) Björn Lindemann (VfL Osnabrück)
- September: (Germany) Roberto Pinto (SV Sandhausen)
- October: (Germany) Tobias Schweinsteiger (SpVgg Unterhaching)
- November: (Germany) Björn Lindemann (VfL Osnabrück)
- December: (Tunisia) Najeh Braham (Erzgebirge Aue)
- February: (Norway) Tore Andreas Gundersen (Dynamo Dresden)
- March: (Germany) Andreas Spann (1. FC Heidenheim)
- April: (Germany) Björn Lindemann (VfL Osnabrück)

Björn Lindemann was named as player of the season
