= Stoilov =

Stoilov (Bulgarian: Стоилов) is a surname. Notable people with the surname include:

- Damian Stoilov, Canadian politician
- Delcho Stoilov (born 1981), Bulgarian footballer
- Konstantin Stoilov (1853–1901), Bulgarian politician
- Petr Stoilov (born 1975), Czech footballer
- Stanimir Stoilov (born 1967), Bulgarian footballer and manager
- Stojanče Stoilov (born 1987), Macedonian handball player
- Stoycho Stoilov (born 1971), Bulgarian footballer
