= Pavel Janeček (footballer) =

Czech footballer

Personal information
- Date of birth: 4 September 1968 (age 58)
- Height: 1.70 m (5 ft 7 in)
- Position: Midfielder

Senior career*
Years	Team	Apps	(Gls)
1988–1991	Spartak Hradec Králové		
1992–1997	Slovan Liberec		
1997	Svit Zlín		
1997–1998	Atlantic Lázně Bohdaneč		
1998–1999	Bohemians Praha		
1999–2003	Spolana Neratovice		
2003–2004	Kladno		
- * Club domestic league appearances and goals

Pavel Janeček (born 4 September 1968) is a retired Czech football midfielder.
