= Matuszny =

Matuszny is a Polish surname. Notable people with the surname include:

- Kamil Matuszny (born 1974), Czech-Polish footballer
- Kazimierz Matuszny (born 1960), Polish politician
