= Radek Šelicha =

Czech footballer

Personal information
- Date of birth: 12 September 1975 (age 51)
- Place of birth: Mělník, Czechoslovakia
- Height: 1.81 m (5 ft 11 in)
- Position: Midfielder

Senior career*
Years	Team	Apps	(Gls)
1994–1995	VTJ Žatec		
1995–1998	Chmel Blšany		
1997	→ FK Teplice (loan)		
1997	→ Ústí nad Labem (loan)		
1998–1999	Spolana Neratovice		
1999–2000	Viktoria Plzeň		
2000–2005	Chmel Blšany		
2006–2007	SK Kladno		
2008–2009	ZFC Meuselwitz		
- * Club domestic league appearances and goals

Radek Šelicha (born 12 September 1975) is a retired Czech football midfielder.
