= Smíšek =

Smíšek (feminine: Smíšková) is a Czech surname derived from smích, i.e. 'laugh'. The name denoted someone who liked to laugh. As a surname, it was documented already in 1556. Notable people with the surname include:

- Jeff Smisek (born 1954), American businessman
- Mirek Smíšek (1925–2013), Czech-New Zealand potter
- Petr Smíšek (born 1978), Czech footballer
- Sandra Smisek (born 1977), German footballer
