= Predrag Stevanović =

Serbian footballer

Personal information
- Date of birth: 3 March 1991 (age 35)
- Place of birth: Essen, Germany
- Height: 1.78 m (5 ft 10 in)
- Position: Attacking midfielder

Youth career
- 1996–1998: TuS Essen-West
- 1998–2002: Rot-Weiss Essen
- 2002–2010: Schalke 04

Senior career*
Years	Team	Apps	(Gls)
2010	Schalke 04 II	8	(0)
2011–2014	Werder Bremen II	27	(5)
2011–2014	Werder Bremen	3	(0)
2015–2016	Stuttgarter Kickers II	2	(0)
2016–2018	Wattenscheid 09	8	(1)
Total		48	(6)

International career
2008–2010	Serbia U19	17	(6)
- * Club domestic league appearances and goals

Predrag Stevanović (born 3 March 1991) is a Serbian former professional footballer who played as an attacking midfielder. He is an older brother of Aleksandar Stevanović. In a career plagued by injuries Stevanović was kept out of action for over 1000 days between 2009 and 2014. He attended the Gesamtschule Berger Feld.

== Career statistics ==
Appearances and goals by club, season and competition
Club	Season	League			Cup		Total	
Club	Season	League	Apps	Goals	Apps	Goals	Apps	Goals
Schalke 04 II	2010–11	Regionalliga West	8	0	—		8	0
Werder Bremen	2010–11	Bundesliga	3	0	0	0	3	0
Werder Bremen II	2010–11	3. Liga	10	3	—		10	3
Werder Bremen II	2011–12	3. Liga	12	0	—		12	0
Werder Bremen II	2012–13	Regionalliga Nord	5	2	—		5	2
Werder Bremen II	Total		27	5	—		27	5
Stuttgarter Kickers II	2015–16	Oberliga Baden-Württemberg	2	0	—		2	0
SG Wattenscheid 09	2016–17	Regionalliga West	3	0	—		3	0
SG Wattenscheid 09	2017–18	Regionalliga West	5	1	—		5	1
SG Wattenscheid 09	Total		8	1	—		8	1
Career total			48	6	0	0	48	6
