= Lennart Thy =

German footballer (born 1992)

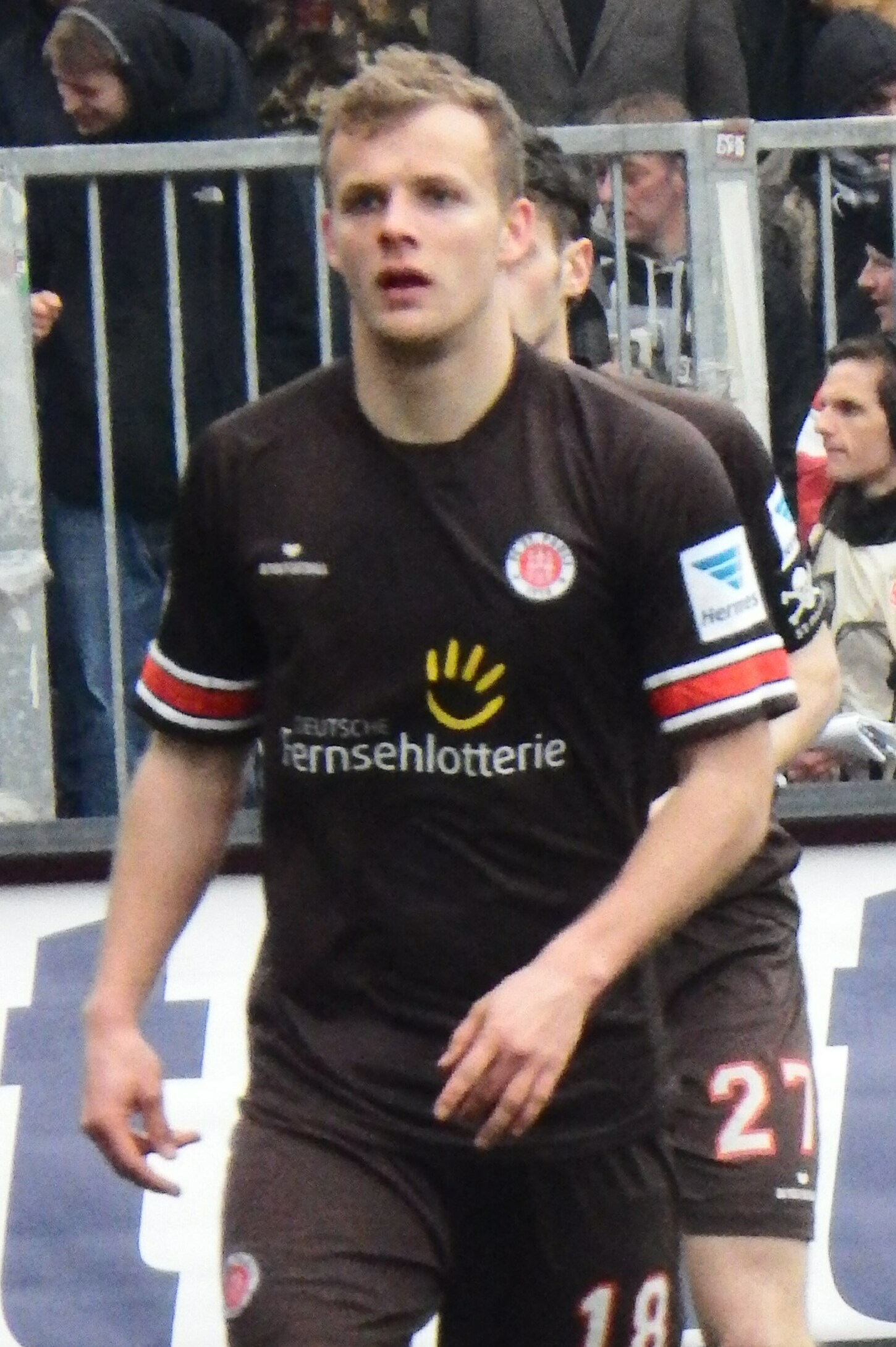
- Thy playing for FC St. Pauli in 2013

Personal information
- Date of birth: 25 February 1992 (age 34)
- Place of birth: Frechen, Germany
- Height: 1.84 m (6 ft 0 in)
- Position: Forward

Team information
- Current team: Lion City Sailors
- Number: 9

Youth career
- 1998–1999: Viktoria Frechen
- 1999–2003: FC Norden
- 2003–2005: PSV Norden
- 2005–2007: JFV Norden
- 2007–2011: Werder Bremen

Senior career*
Years	Team	Apps	(Gls)
2009–2012	Werder Bremen II	70	(9)
2010–2012	Werder Bremen	5	(0)
2012–2016	FC St. Pauli	107	(18)
2012–2013	→ FC St. Pauli II	5	(2)
2016–2018	Werder Bremen	6	(1)
2017	→ FC St. Pauli (loan)	15	(2)
2017–2018	→ VVV (loan)	32	(7)
2018	Erzurumspor	12	(1)
2019–2020	PEC Zwolle	41	(15)
2020–2022	Sparta Rotterdam	69	(19)
2022–2024	PEC Zwolle	68	(36)
2024–	Lion City Sailors	48	(44)

International career
2008	Germany U16	4	(0)
2008–2009	Germany U17	21	(11)
2009	Germany U18	4	(3)
2010–2011	Germany U19	8	(3)
2011–2012	Germany U20	7	(1)
Medal record
Men's football
Representing Germany
UEFA European Under-17 Championship
Winner	2009 Germany
- * Club domestic league appearances and goals as of 1 November 2026

Lennart Thy (born 25 February 1992) is a German professional footballer who plays as a forward for Singapore Premier League club Lion City Sailors.

== Club career ==
On 18 January 2016, Werder Bremen announced Thy would return to the club for the 2016–17 season. He signed a three-year contract. On 24 September 2016, he scored his first goal for the club since his return after coming on as a substitute in a 2–1 win over VfL Wolfsburg.

=== VVV-Venlo (loan) ===
In July 2017, Werder Bremen confirmed that Thy would be loaned to Eredivisie side VVV-Venlo for the 2017–18 season.

=== BB Erzurumspor ===
In July 2018, Thy left Werder Bremen permanently to join BB Erzurumspor, a newly promoted club that gained promotion to the Turkish 2018–19 Süper Lig.

In September 2018, Thy won the FIFA Fair Play Award during the 2018 The Best FIFA Football Awards. He had missed an Eredivisie match for VVV-Venlo against PSV Eindhoven to save the life of a leukemia patient in urgent need of matching stem cells for treatment by donating blood. Widespread coverage of this action was followed by an increase in cell donations in the Netherlands.

=== PEC Zwolle ===
On 5 January 2019, Thy returned to the Eredivisie signing with PEC Zwolle on a one-and-a-half-year contract.

=== Sparta Rotterdam ===
In May 2020, Thy agreed to join Sparta Rotterdam, also of the Eredivisie.

=== Return to PEC Zwolle ===
In June 2022, Thy returned to former club PEC Zwolle, newly relegated to the Eerste Divisie. He signed a three-year contract. On 3 March 2023, in a league match against Den Bosch, Thy came on as a substitute at half-time for Younes Taha and scored a hat-trick in a record-tying 13–0 league victory. Thy claimed the top goalscorer's award in the Eerste Divisie for the 2022–23 Eerste Divisie season, having scored 23 goals in 36 appearances. His remarkable contributions played a significant role in PEC's successful promotion back to the 2023–24 Eredivisie.

=== Lion City Sailors ===
On 31 May 2024, Singaporean club Lion City Sailors announced the signing of Thy on a two-year contract from PEC Zwolle. The transfer fee was undisclosed and reported as less than €600,000 by Singaporean newspaper The Straits Times. On 18 June, Thy made his debut in a 2–0 win over DPMM. Despite Maxime Lestienne's equaliser in the 91st minute of the 2025 AFC Champions League Two final against Sharjah, the Sailors finished as a runner-up after conceding in the 97th minute to finish the game in a 2–1 defeat.

== International career ==
Thy was joint topscorer in the tournament alongside Luc Castaignos as Germany won the 2009 UEFA European Under-17 Championship. Thy scored the equaliser to Castaignos' opener in the final as Germany beat the Netherlands 2–1 after-extra-time.

== Career statistics ==
As of match played 30 May 2026

Appearances and goals by club, season and competition
Club	Season	League			Cup		Continental		Other		Total	
Club	Season	Division	Apps	Goals	Apps	Goals	Apps	Goals	Apps	Goals	Apps	Goals
Werder Bremen II	2009–10	3. Liga	13	2	—		—		—		13	2
Werder Bremen II	2010–11	3. Liga	35	5	—		—		—		35	5
Werder Bremen II	2011–12	3. Liga	22	2	—		—		—		22	2
Werder Bremen II	Total		70	9	0	0	0	0	0	0	70	9
Werder Bremen	2010–11	Bundesliga	2	0	0	0	1 (Note: Appearances in the UEFA Champions League)	0	—		3	0
Werder Bremen	2011–12	Bundesliga	3	0	1	0	—		—		4	0
Werder Bremen	Total		5	0	1	0	1	0	0	0	7	0
FC St. Pauli II	2012–13	Regionalliga Nord	5	2	—		—		—		5	2
FC St. Pauli	2012–13	2. Bundesliga	18	1	1	0	—		—		19	1
FC St. Pauli	2013–14	2. Bundesliga	27	4	1	0	—		—		28	4
FC St. Pauli	2014–15	2. Bundesliga	32	5	1	0	—		—		33	5
FC St. Pauli	2015–16	2. Bundesliga	30	8	1	0	—		—		31	8
FC St. Pauli	Total		107	18	4	0	0	0	0	0	111	18
Werder Bremen	2016–17	Bundesliga	6	1	1	0	—		—		7	1
FC St. Pauli (loan)	2016–17	2. Bundesliga	15	2	0	0	—		—		15	2
VVV-Venlo (loan)	2017–18	Eredivisie	32	7	2	1	—		—		34	8
BB Erzurumspor	2018–19	Süper Lig	12	1	2	0	—		—		14	1
PEC Zwolle	2018–19	Eredivisie	17	9	0	0	—		—		17	9
PEC Zwolle	2019–20	Eredivisie	24	6	2	2	–		—		26	8
PEC Zwolle	Total		41	15	2	2	0	0	0	0	43	17
Sparta Rotterdam	2020–21	Eredivisie	34	14	1	0	—		1 (Note: Appearance in Eredivisie play-offs)	0	36	14
Sparta Rotterdam	2021–22	Eredivisie	34	5	2	0	—		—		36	5
Sparta Rotterdam	Total		68	19	3	0	0	0	1	0	72	19
PEC Zwolle	2022–23	Eerste Divisie	36	23	1	0	—		—		37	23
PEC Zwolle	2023–24	Eredivisie	32	13	1	0	—		—		33	13
PEC Zwolle	Total		68	36	2	0	—		—		70	36
Lion City Sailors	2024–25	Singapore Premier League	26	28	4	3	16 (Note: 4 in ASEAN Club Championship and 12 in AFC Champions League Two)	3 (Note: 3 in AFC Champions League Two)	0	0	46	34
Lion City Sailors	2025–26	Singapore Premier League	21	15	3	1	8 (Note: 3 in ASEAN Club Championship and 5 in AFC Champions League Two)	5 (Note: 2 in ASEAN Club Championship and 3 in AFC Champions League Two)	1 (Note: 1 in Community Shield)	1 (Note: 1 in Community Shield)	33	22
Lion City Sailors	Total		47	43	7	4	24	8	1	1	79	56
Career total			476	153	24	7	25	8	2	1	527	169

== Honours ==
Lion City Sailors

- AFC Champions League Two runner-up: 2024–25
- Singapore Premier League: 2024–25
- Singapore Cup: 2024–25, 2025–26
- Singapore Community Shield runner-up: 2025

Germany U17

- UEFA European Under-17 Championship: 2009

Individual

- FIFA Fair Play Award: 2018
- UEFA European Under-17 Championship top goalscorer: 2009
- UEFA European Under-17 Championship Team of the tournament: 2009
- Eerste Divisie top goalscorer: 2022–23
- Eerste Divisie Team of the Year: 2022–23
- Singapore Premier League Team of the Year: 2024–25
