= Kamil Matuszny =

Czech footballer

Personal information
- Date of birth: 25 November 1974 (age 51)
- Place of birth: Czechoslovakia
- Height: 1.78 m (5 ft 10 in)
- Position: Midfielder

Youth career
- 1983–1986: TJ Písek u Jablunkova
- 1986–1993: Železárny Třinec

Senior career*
Years	Team	Apps	(Gls)
1994	VTJ Znojmo		
1995–1998	Železárny Třinec	68	(7)
1996	→ Baník Havířov (loan)	15	(0)
1998–2005	Bohemians 1905	91	(14)
2000	→ Slovan Liberec (loan)	7	(0)
2001	→ Spolana Neratovice (loan)	13	(1)
2003	→ Spolana Neratovice (loan)	0	(0)
2003	→ Zenit Čáslav (loan)		
2005	Kujawiak Włocławek	10	(0)
2005–2010	Slavoj Vyšehrad		
- * Club domestic league appearances and goals

Kamil Matuszny (born 25 November 1974) is a Czech former professional footballer who played as a midfielder. He belongs to the Polish minority in the Czech Republic.

Matuszny played most of his career for Bohemians 1905, going on loan on several occasions. He ended his professional career in 2010.
