= Mario Maek =

German footballer and manager

- Mario Maek with 1. FC Union Berlin in 1988

Personal information
- Date of birth: 14 November 1964 (age 61)
- Place of birth: East Germany
- Height: 1.86 m (6 ft 1 in)
- Position: Defender

Youth career
- 1973–1983: BFC Dynamo

Senior career*
Years	Team	Apps	(Gls)
1983–1987	BFC Dynamo	37	(1)
1984–1988	BFC Dynamo II		
1987–1995	1. FC Union Berlin	131	(19)
1995	SC Union 06 Berlin		
1995–2000	BFC Dynamo		

International career
	East Germany U-21	6	(0)

Managerial career
- 2001–2002: BFC Dynamo
- Sparta Lichtenberg
- * Club domestic league appearances and goals

Mario Maek (born 14 November 1964) is a German former professional footballer who played as a defender.

Maek began playing football for the youth teams of BFC Dynamo. He made his professional debut for BFC Dynamo away against BSG Stahl Riesa in the 17th matchday of the 1983-84 DDR-Oberliga on 10 March 1983. BFC Dynamo was dominating football in East Germany at the time. Maek then made his international debut BFC Dynamo against AS Roma in the quarter-finals of the 1983-84 European Cup at the Friedrich-Ludwig-Jahn-Sportpark on 21 March 1984. Maek was used as a regular player during the remainder of the season. Maek was part of the first team of BFC Dynamo for four seasons and won the league title on each occasion. He made 37 appearances for BFC Dynamo in the DDR-Oberliga.

Maek was transferred to local rival 1. FC Union Berlin in 1987. He would spend seven and a half years at 1. FC Union Berlin, playing in the DDR-Oberliga, the DDR-Liga and the NOFV-Oberliga. Maek saved 1. FC Union Berlin from relegation to the second tier DDR-Liga with a late 3-2 goal against FC Karl-Marx-Stadt in the last match day of the 1987-88 DDR-Oberliga on 28 May 1988. The goal was scored after a free kick from Olaf Hirsch and a header by Olaf Seier that had hit the post. All three were former players of local rival BFC Dynamo in 1. FC Union Berlin. His career in 1. Union Berlin came to an end in October 1994, when he received a six-year ban for violent conduct against a referee. After appeal this was commuted to just one month and Maek resumed his career with SC Union 06 Berlin.

Maek returned to BFC Dynamo, now named FC Berlin, in summer of 1995. He was one of the core players of the team in the Regionalliga Nordost. Maek retired from the game after the 1999-2000 season. He continued at BFC Dynamo after his playing career. He took on various roles, including managing director and assistant coach. Maek was also served as interim coach from 2001 to 2002. Former long-time BFC Dynamo goalkeeper Bodo Rudwaleit served as his assistant. His son, Kevin, is also a footballer, who has also played for 1. FC Union Berlin.
