= Sebastian Mielitz =

German footballer (born 1989)

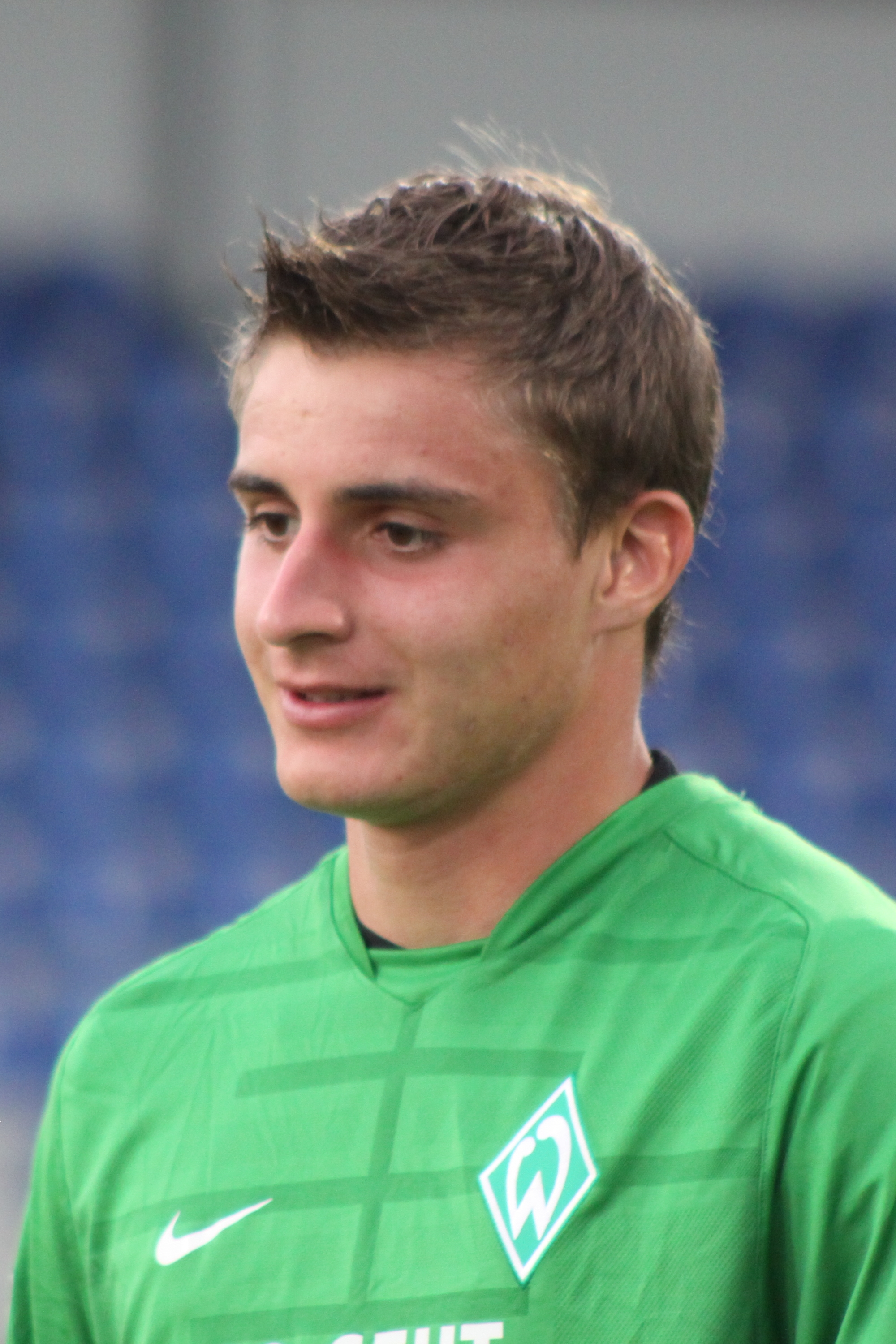
- Mielitz with Werder Bremen in 2009

Personal information
- Full name: Sebastian Mielitz
- Date of birth: 18 July 1989 (age 37)
- Place of birth: Zehdenick, East Germany
- Height: 1.88 m (6 ft 2 in)
- Position: Goalkeeper

Team information
- Current team: Werder Bremen II
- Number: 21

Youth career
- 2000–2002: Eintracht Oranienburg
- 2002–2003: MSV Neuruppin
- 2003–2005: Energie Cottbus
- 2005–2007: Werder Bremen

Senior career*
Years	Team	Apps	(Gls)
2007–2009	Werder Bremen II	55	(0)
2009–2014	Werder Bremen	62	(0)
2014–2015	SC Freiburg	0	(0)
2015–2017	Greuther Fürth	33	(0)
2017	Greuther Fürth II	2	(0)
2017–2020	SønderjyskE	92	(0)
2020–2022	Viktoria Köln	35	(0)
2022	Helsingør	12	(0)
2022–2024	VfB Oldenburg	28	(0)
2024–	Werder Bremen II	18	(0)

International career
2008–2009	Germany U20	3	(0)
- * Club domestic league appearances and goals as of 6 March 2026

Sebastian Mielitz (born 18 July 1989) is a German professional footballer who plays as a goalkeeper for Werder Bremen II.

== Club career ==
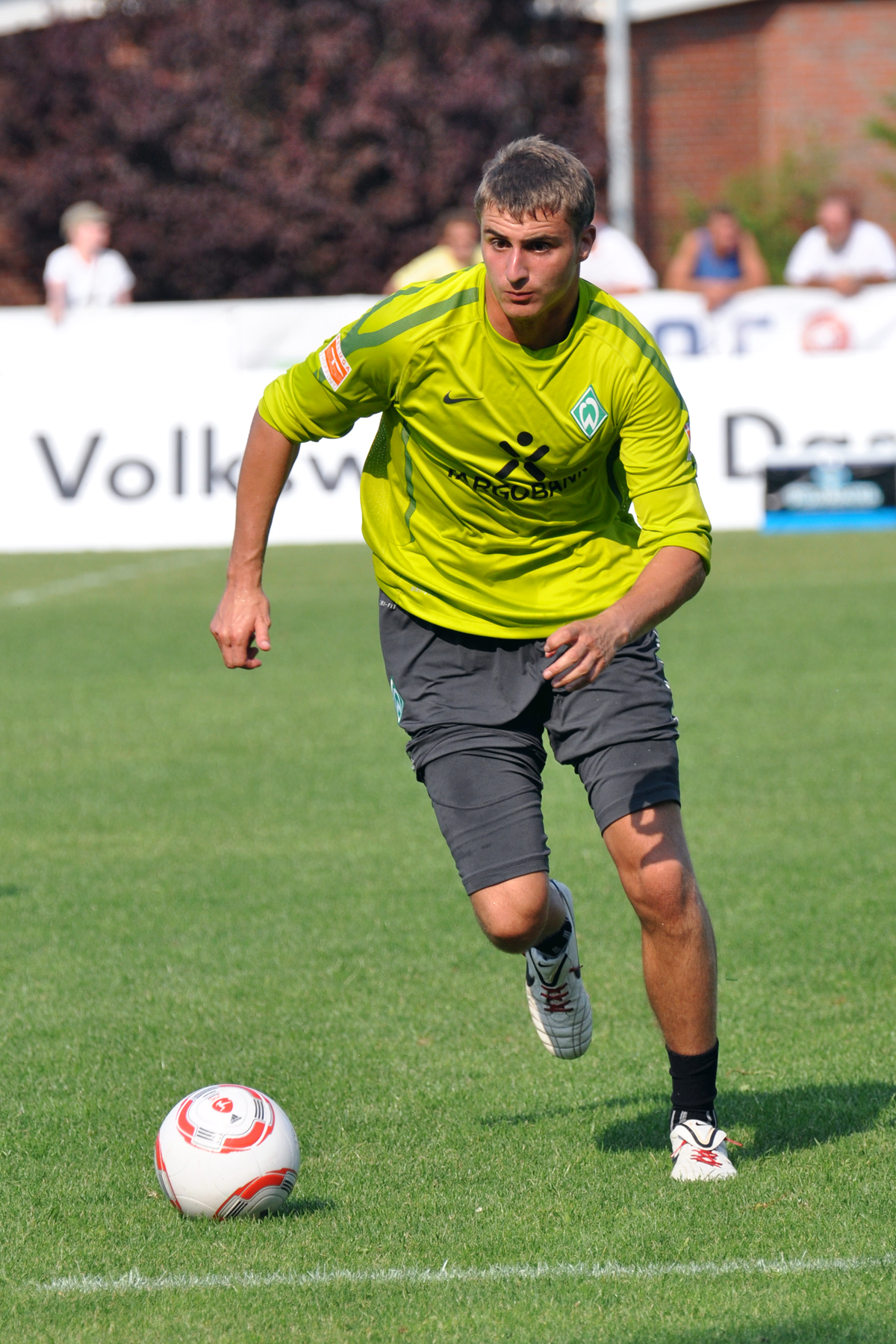
Mielitz dribbling the ball during training at Werder Bremen.

=== Early career ===
Sebastian Mielitz was born in Zehdenick, and began his football career at Eintracht Oranienburg, moving later to MSV Neuruppin and Energie Cottbus. In 2005, he joined the youth team of SV Werder Bremen at age 17. On 10 November 2007, he debuted for the second team of Werder Bremen in the second half of a match, replacing the injured first-choice goalkeeper Nico Pellatz.

In August 2008, Mielitz extended his contract until 2010. His professional debut in the 3. Liga was on 16 August 2008 against Jahn Regensburg. He played 20 times for the side in the 2008–09 season despite competing with Pellatz over a first choice role at the club's reserve.

=== Werder Bremen ===
During the 2007–08 season, Mielitz appeared twice as an unused substitute for a match against Stuttgart and Bayer Leverkusen. Two seasons later, he made his first appearance with Werder's first team on 3 December 2009 in a Europa League home match against Nacional, filling in for the injured Tim Wiese. Three days later, on 6 December 2009, he debuted in the Bundesliga in a 0–0 away draw against 1. FC Köln, making a good performance throughout the match and kept his first clean sheet on his debut. In February 2010, Mielitz signed a contract extension, keeping him until 2012. Although he was a third-choice goalkeeper for the 2009–10 season, he said he was willing to be patient to fight over a first choice goalkeeper role in the near future. On 30 March 2010, when he made another appearance, starting in goal once again, in a 4–2 win over FC Nürnberg. He suffered a knee injury later in the season. He made a total of three appearances in the 2009–10 season.

Mielitz remained a third-choice goalkeeper behind Wiese and Christian Vander ahead of the 2010–11 season. On 20 October 2010, he made his first appearance in the UEFA Champions League group stage against Twente, coming on for the injured Wiese. Three days later, he started in goal again, making several saves contributing to 4–1 away win against Borussia Mönchengladbach, the club's first of the season. After the match, his performance was praised and he was named Man of the Match. He featured in another Champions League match against Twente on 2 November 2010 which Werder Bremen 2–0 lost. After this, Mielitz remained on the substitute bench for the next two months until coming on as a late substitute following Wiese's sending off in a 3–1 loss against Bayern Munich on 29 January 2011. He appeared three more matches from 5 February 2011 to 19 February 2011 before Wiese's return from suspension. He remained on the substitute bench for the rest of the 2010–11 season. At the end of the season, during which he made the total of 10 appearances for the side, Mielitz signed another contract extension, keeping him until 2013.

Ahead of the 2011–12 season, Mielitz was promoted to a second–choice goalkeeper behind Wiese, taking Vander's place and demoting him to third-choice. After starting the season on the substitute bench, he made his first appearance on 17 September 2011 coming on as a replacement for Wiese, who had been sent off in the early minutes of the match, and conceding a goal in the second–half from Philipp Wollscheid, in a 1–1 draw against 1. FC Nürnberg. While Wiese served a three-match ban until late October, Mielitz played the next three matches and filled in showing very good performances, including in a win over Hertha BSC on 25 September 2011. On 3 December 2011, he started again after Wiese was given a bereavement leave, and conceded four goals, in a 4–1 defeat to Bayern Munich. After suffering short–term injury in January 2012, he was featured in two matches between 17 March 2012 and 24 March 2012 following Wiese's injury. He remained on the substitute bench throughout the 2011–12 season and was limited to a total of 7 appearances for the side. Shortly after the end of the season, he signed another contract extension in May 2012 which would keep him until 2014.

Ahead of the 2012–13 season, Mielitz was expected to be the club's first choice goalkeeper by the club's general manager Klaus Allofs following the departure of Wiese to Hoffenheim. In the LIGA total! Cup 2012, Mielitz was the hero when he made two saves in the penalties shoot-out (one from Bastian Schweinsteiger) in a 4–2 win over Bayern Munich to progress through the final which they beat Borussia Dortmund in a penalty shoot-out again the following day. After the match against Bayern Munich, he said YouTube helped him save a penalty from Schweinsteiger. After starting in goal in the opening game of the season against Borussia Dortmund, he kept his first clean sheet, in a 2–0 win over Hamburg on 1 September 2012. Throughout the 2012–13 season, Mielitz was an ever present goalkeeper for the side, but received criticism from the media and pundits, including Frank Rost for conceding goals and lack of clean sheets, which he kept three times during the season. In response to criticism, Mielitz defended himself, saying: "I make my cause well!" and felt he was treated unfairly. During a 1–1 draw against 1. FSV Mainz 05 on 30 March 2013, he put out his best performance at Werder Bremen, making a lot of saves, to help the side ease their chance to avoid relegation.

In the 2013–14 season, Mielitz continued to remain the club's first choice goalkeeper and started well keeping two clean sheets in the first two league matches against Eintracht Braunschweig and Augsburg. He also kept two more clean sheets while remaining first choice goalkeeper. However, as in the previous season, Mielitz continuously conceded goals on a regular basis, leading Kicker to say that he lacked "charisma, though he seems calm, factual, sometimes a little too pale." Following a 3–2 loss to 1. FSV Mainz on 24 November 2013, he was dropped as a first choice goalkeeper in favour of Raphael Wolf and was placed on the substitute bench for the rest of the season. In response to this, Mielitz said he was disappointed upon learning that he would remain on the substitute bench. He finished the 2013–14 season with 14 appearances.

It was confirmed in April 2014 that Mielitz would not be offered a new contract by the club and was expected to leave the club at the end of the season. Although he did not play against Hertha BC, he made his farewell appearance and confirmed his departure from the club.

=== SC Freiburg ===
Thereafter, Mielitz signed a three–year contract with SC Freiburg.

Mielitz made his SC Freiburg debut in the first round of the DFB-Pokal, in a 2–0 win over Eintracht Trier 05, keeping a clean sheet. He made another appearance in the second round of the DFB-Pokal once again, in a 5–2 win over 1860 Munich. However, he struggled to get more playing time at the club, with newly Roman Bürki being preferred as the first-choice goalkeeper he stayed on the substitute bench throughout the season.

=== Greuther Fürth ===
With a lack of first team opportunities at SC Freiburg, Mielitz opted to join Greuther Fürth on 11 June 2015, signing a two–year contract. Upon joining the club, he was expected by then-manager Stefan Ruthenbeck, who was appointed one day before he signed for them, to fight for the first-choice goalkeeper role.

Mielitz made his Greuther Fürth debut in the opening game of the season, keeping a clean sheet in a 1–0 win over Karlsruher SC. After making his debut, he quickly established himself as a first-choice goalkeeper at Greuther Fürth. After keeping two more clean sheets against VfL Bochum and Eintracht Braunschweig at the end of September, he, however, conceded 10 goals in the next two matches, with a defeat to VfL Bochum. and Freiburg. In the following match against 1860 Munich, Mielitz was able to redeem himself when he kept a clean sheet, in a 1–0 win. Throughout the 2015–16 season, he remained the first-choice goalkeeper and played every match until he was dropped on the last game of the season in a favour of Mark Flekken against SV Sandhausen.

Ahead of the 2016–17 season, the club signed three goalkeepers, Balázs Megyeri, Sascha Burchert and Marius Funk, providing more competition for Mielitz. Because of this, Mielitz struggled to regain his role as the club's first-choice goalkeeper in his second season and Megyeri was preferred instead. As a result, Mielitz made no appearances for the side this season and played twice for the reserve side. At the end of the 2016–17 season, he was released by the club after being told that they would not extend his contract.

=== SønderjyskE ===
With his Greuther Fürth contract running out at the end of the 2016–17 season, Mielitz joined Danish Superliga club SønderjyskE for the new season on a two-year contract with the option of a third in May 2017.

Mielitz made his debut for SønderjyskE in the opening game of the season, in a 0–0 draw against Randers and keeping a clean sheet in the process. Since making his debut, he managed to dispatch the first choice goalkeeper role from Lukas Fernandes.

Mielitz won the 2019–20 Danish Cup with SønderjyskE.

=== Viktoria Köln ===
In July 2020, Mielitz joined 3. Liga side FC Viktoria Köln on a free transfer. In his first season, Mielitz was the first choice and made 37 appearances during the season.

60 second into a friendly pre-season game in July 2021 against Borussia Mönchengladbach, Mielitz twisted his ankle and tore his anterior and posterior syndesmotic ligament, which kept him out for the rest of 2021.

=== Helsingør ===
On 31 January 2022, Mielitz returned to Denmark, when he joined FC Helsingør on a deal until June 2024. On 28 June 2022, Helsingør confirmed that, by mutual agreement, Mielitz' contract had been germinated as he wanted to return to Germany to be closer to his family.

=== VfB Oldenburg ===
On 30 June 2022, Mielitz returned to northern Germany, signing with VfB Oldenburg, newly promoted to the 3. Liga.

=== Werder Bremen II ===
On 1 May 2024, Werder Bremen announced he would return to the club in the summer, ten years after he left, to play for the club's reserves in the 2024–25 season.

== International career ==
In October 2008, Mielitz was called up by the Germany under-20 national team for the first time and made his Germany U20 debut on 12 October 2008, in a 2–1 loss against Austria U20.

He was part of the team that participated at the 2009 FIFA U-20 World Cup.

== Personal life ==
Born in Zehdenick, East Germany, Mielitz said he is from Neulöwenberg and described it as "a village, just a village, there's nothing but forest and lake around, there are 400, maybe 450 inhabitants, a main road." Mielitz also said he grew up supporting Werder Bremen. Also, in the same interview, he mentioned: "I am rather into myself, quiet, patient. In the goal, however, I am not the least. I'll be on the table."

Mielitz attended a sports school when he was 13 before going to a different school in Bremen where he graduated despite being absent from class. He revealed that his parents were supportive of his sport choices, having taken him to important events and games, but after attending boarding school in Cottbus, he began to live apart from his parents and see them only on weekends. In addition to speaking German, Mielitz also speaks English and Spanish. In July 2015, Mielitz became a father for the first time when his girlfriend gave birth to a baby boy.

== Career statistics ==
As of match played on 1 July 2023

Appearances and goals by club, season and competition
Club	Season	League			Cup		Continental		Other		Total	
Club	Season	Division	Apps	Goals	Apps	Goals	Apps	Goals	Apps	Goals	Apps	Goals
Werder Bremen II	2007–08	Regionalliga Nord	15	0	—		—		—		15	0
Werder Bremen II	2008–09	3. Liga	19	0	—		—		—		19	0
Werder Bremen II	2009–10	3. Liga	19	0	—		—		—		19	0
Werder Bremen II	2010–11	3. Liga	2	0	—		—		—		2	0
Werder Bremen II	Total		55	0	—		—		—		55	0
Werder Bremen	2009–10	Bundesliga	2	0	0	0	1 (Note: Appearance in the UEFA Cup)	0	—		3	0
Werder Bremen	2010–11	Bundesliga	6	0	1	0	2 (Note: Appearances in the UEFA Champions League)	0	—		9	0
Werder Bremen	2011–12	Bundesliga	7	0	0	0	—		—		7	0
Werder Bremen	2012–13	Bundesliga	34	0	1	0	—		—		35	0
Werder Bremen	2013–14	Bundesliga	13	0	1	0	—		—		14	0
Werder Bremen	Total		62	0	3	0	3	0	—		68	0
SC Freiburg	2014–15	Bundesliga	0	0	2	0	—		—		2	0
Greuther Fürth	2015–16	2. Bundesliga	33	0	1	0	—		—		34	0
Greuther Fürth	2016–17	2. Bundesliga	0	0	0	0	—		—		0	0
Greuther Fürth	Total		33	0	1	0	—		—		34	0
Greuther Fürth II	2016–17	Regionalliga Bayern	2	0	—		—		—		2	0
SønderjyskE	2017–18	Danish Superliga	32	0	1	0	—		4 (Note: Appearance(s) in the Danish Superliga UEFA Europa League playoffs)	0	37	0
SønderjyskE	2018–19	Danish Superliga	32	0	1	0	—		2	0	35	0
SønderjyskE	2019–20	Danish Superliga	28	0	3	0	—		0	0	31	0
SønderjyskE	Total		92	0	5	0	0	0	6	0	103	0
Viktoria Köln	2020–21	3. Liga	35	0	—		—		—		35	0
Helsingør	2021–22	Danish 1st Division	12	0	—		—		—		12	0
VfB Oldenburg	2022–23	3. Liga	20	0	—		—		—		20	0
VfB Oldenburg	2023–24	Regionalliga Nord	0	0	—		—		—		0	0
VfB Oldenburg	Total		20	0	0	0	—		—		20	0
Career total			311	0	11	0	3	0	6	0	331	0

== Honours ==
SønderjyskE

- Danish Cup: 2019–20
