= Nicolas Feldhahn =

German footballer

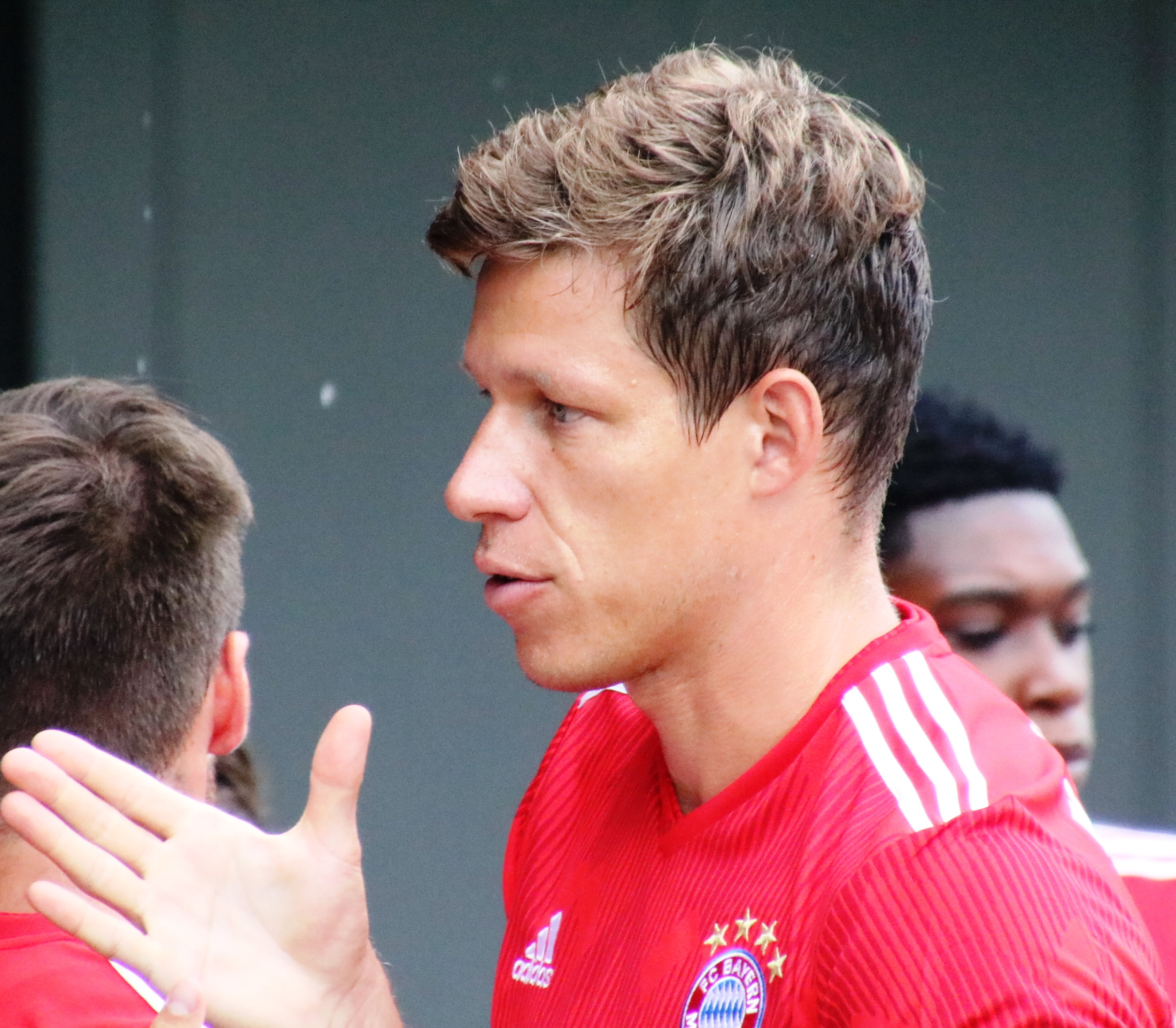

Personal information
- Date of birth: 14 August 1986 (age 40)
- Place of birth: Munich, West Germany
- Height: 1.90 m (6 ft 3 in)
- Position: Defensive midfielder

Youth career
- 1992–1999: SV Warngau
- 1999–2003: 1860 Munich
- 2003–2005: SpVgg Unterhaching

Senior career*
Years	Team	Apps	(Gls)
2005–2007	SpVgg Unterhaching	21	(4)
2006	SpVgg Unterhaching II	6	(0)
2007–2008	Erzgebirge Aue	19	(1)
2008–2010	Werder Bremen II	67	(7)
2010–2013	Kickers Offenbach	82	(5)
2013–2015	VfL Osnabrück	65	(10)
2015–2022	Bayern Munich II	188	(14)
2016–2022	Bayern Munich	0	(0)
- * Club domestic league appearances and goals

Nicolas Feldhahn (born 14 August 1986) is a German former professional footballer who played as a defensive midfielder.

== Career ==
=== Early career (2005–08) ===
In the 2005–06 season, Feldhahn made an appearance in the 2. Bundesliga and an appearance the German Cup for SpVgg Unterhaching. The following season, he scored four goals in 20 appearances and two appearances in the German Cup. He was sent–off in a 4–0 loss to 1. FC Kaiserslautern on 25 February 2007. He also appeared in six appearances for the reserve team. He was sent–off in a 1–0 win for the reserve team against Bayern Hof on 26 August 2006.

For the 2007–08 season, he played for Erzgebirge Aue. He scored a goal in 19 league appearances. He also made an appearance in the German Cup. This proved to be his only season for Erzgebirge Aue. He moved to Werder Bremen II the following season.

=== Life in the 3. Liga (2008–15) ===
He moved to Werder Bremen II for the 2008–09 season where he scored three goals in 32 appearances. He received 12 yellow cards during the season. During the 2009–10 season, he scored four goals in 35 appearances.

He then moved to Kickers Offenbach for the 2010–11 season. He scored three goals in 31 league appearances and a goal in three German Cup appearances. During the 2011–12 season, he made 14 league appearances. During the 2012–13 season, which ended up as his final season at the club, he scored two goals in 37 league appearances. He also made four German Cup appearances during the season.

He then moved to VfL Osnabrück for the 2013–14 season. In his first season, he scored five goals in 32 league appearances and two German Cup appearances. He was sent off in a 3–1 loss to Rot-Weiß Erfurt on 28 September 2013. Again, during the 2014–15 season, he scored five goals in 32 league appearances.

=== Bayern Munich (2015–22) ===
During the 2015–16 season, he made a league appearance and a DFB-Pokal appearance before transferring to Bayern Munich II on 26 August 2015.

In the pre-season for the 2016–17 season, Feldhahn played for the first team. He played against Manchester City, A.C. Milan, Inter Milan, and Real Madrid. Carlo Ancelotti put Feldhahn on the bench for the 2016 DFL-Supercup against Borussia Dortmund and the first round of the 2016–17 DFB-Pokal against Carl Zeiss Jena. Feldhahn did not come into either match. During his time with the first team, he also played for the reserve team. Bayern put Feldhahn in their UEFA Champions League squad for the 2016–17 season.

In May 2022 Feldhahn announced he would retire at the end of the 2021–22 season. He received his last call-up with the Bayern Munich senior team as an unused substitute during a 2–1 home loss Bundesliga match against Borussia Mönchengladbach on 7 January 2022.

== Career statistics ==
As of match played on 20 May 2022

Appearances and goals by club, season and competition
Club	Season	League			DFB-Pokal		Other		Total		Ref.
Club	Season	League	Apps	Goals	Apps	Goals	Apps	Goals	Apps	Goals	Ref.
SpVgg Unterhaching	2005–06	2. Bundesliga	1	0	1	0	—		2	0	
SpVgg Unterhaching	2006–07	2. Bundesliga	20	4	2	0	—		22	4	
SpVgg Unterhaching	Total		21	4	3	0	0	0	24	4	—
SpVgg Unterhaching II	2006–07	Bayernliga	6	0	—		—		6	0	
Erzgebirge Aue	2007–08	2. Bundesliga	19	1	1	0	—		20	1	
Werder Bremen II	2008–09	3. Liga	32	3	—		—		32	3	
Werder Bremen II	2009–10	3. Liga	35	4	—		—		35	4	
Werder Bremen II	Total		67	7	0	0	0	0	67	7	—
Kickers Offenbach	2010–11	3. Liga	31	3	3	1	—		34	4	
Kickers Offenbach	2011–12	3. Liga	14	0	—		—		14	0	
Kickers Offenbach	2012–13	3. Liga	37	2	4	0	—		41	2	
Kickers Offenbach	Total		82	5	7	1	0	0	89	6	—
VfL Osnabrück	2013–14	3. Liga	32	5	2	0	—		34	5	
VfL Osnabrück	2014–15	3. Liga	32	5	—		—		32	5	
VfL Osnabrück	2015–16	3. Liga	1	0	1	0	—		2	0	
VfL Osnabrück	Total		65	10	3	0	0	0	68	10	—
Bayern Munich II	2015–16	Regionalliga Bayern	15	1	—		—		15	1	
Bayern Munich II	2016–17	Regionalliga Bayern	30	4	—		—		30	4	
Bayern Munich II	2017–18	Regionalliga Bayern	25	3	—		—		25	3	
Bayern Munich II	2018–19	Regionalliga Bayern	33	4	—		2	0	35	4	
Bayern Munich II	2019–20	3. Liga	30	0	—		—		30	0	
Bayern Munich II	2020–21	3. Liga	29	1	—		—		29	1	
Bayern Munich II	2021–22	Regionalliga Bayern	26	1	—		—		26	1	
Bayern Munich II	Total		188	14	0	0	2	0	190	8	—
Career total			448	41	14	1	2	0	464	42	—

== Honours ==
Bayern Munich

- DFL-Supercup: 2016
