= Aleksandar Stevanović (footballer) =

German footballer

Personal information
- Date of birth: 16 February 1992 (age 34)
- Place of birth: Essen, Germany
- Height: 1.75 m (5 ft 9 in)
- Position: Attacking midfielder

Youth career
- –2009: TuS Essen-West
- 2006–2009: Rot-Weiss Essen
- 2009–2011: Schalke 04

Senior career*
Years	Team	Apps	(Gls)
2011–2014	Werder Bremen	5	(0)
2011–2014	Werder Bremen II	43	(3)
2014–2017	Hansa Rostock	28	(0)
2015–2017	Hansa Rostock II	5	(6)
2017–2019	SV Elversberg	5	(0)
Total		86	(9)
- * Club domestic league appearances and goals

Aleksandar Stevanović (born 16 February 1992) is a German former professional footballer who played as an attacking midfielder.

== Career ==
=== Schalke 04 ===
Started out his senior career in the Schalke 04 U-19 squad. In his first year in the Under 19 Bundesliga West, he made 19 appearances and scored eleven goals.

=== Werder Bremen ===
On 23 June 2011, Stevanović joined Werder Bremen on a free transfer. In summer 2014 his expiring contract was not extended.

=== Hansa Rostock ===
After being a free agent for almost three months, Stevanović signed for 3. Liga club Hansa Rostock in late September 2014. He received a contract for two years until 2016.

Stevanović retired from playing in 2019 at the age of 27, ending an injury-ravaged career during which he sustained three cruciate ligament tears.

== Personal life ==
He is a younger brother of fellow professional footballer Predrag Stevanović.

== Career statistics ==
Appearances and goals by club, season and competition
Club	Season	League			Cup		Total	
Club	Season	League	Apps	Goals	Apps	Goals	Apps	Goals
Werder Bremen	2011–12	Bundesliga	3	0	0	0	3	0
Werder Bremen	2012–13	Bundesliga	2	0	0	0	2	0
Werder Bremen	Total		5	0	0	0	5	0
Werder Bremen II	2011–12	3. Liga	17	0	—		17	0
Werder Bremen II	2012–13	Regionalliga Nord	6	0	—		6	0
Werder Bremen II	2013–14	Regionalliga Nord	20	3	—		20	3
Werder Bremen II	Total		43	3	—		43	3
Hansa Rostock	2014–15	3. Liga	15	0	0	0	15	0
Hansa Rostock	2015–16	3. Liga	2	0	0	0	2	0
Hansa Rostock	2016–17	3. Liga	11	1	0	0	12	0
Hansa Rostock	Total		28	0	1	0	29	0
Hansa Rostock II	2015–16	NOFV-Oberliga Nord	1	2	—		1	2
Hansa Rostock II	2016–17	NOFV-Oberliga Nord	4	4	—		4	4
Hansa Rostock II	Total		5	6	0	0	5	6
SV Elversberg	2017–19	Regionalliga Südwest	3	0	—		3	0
SV Elversberg	2018–19	Regionalliga Südwest	2	0	—		2	0
SV Elversberg	Total		5	0	0	0	0	0
Career total			86	9	1	0	87	9
