= 2002–03 Czech 2. Liga =

2. česká fotbalová liga
- Season: 2002–03
- Champions: Viktoria Plzeň
- Promoted: Viktoria Plzeň; Opava
- Relegated: Prostějov; Chomutov; Neratovice; Dolní Kounice
- Matches played: 240
- Goals scored: 605 (2.52 per match)
- Top goalscorer: Petr Švancara (20)
- Average attendance: 1,012

The 2002–03 Czech 2. Liga was the tenth season of the 2. česká fotbalová liga, the second tier of the Czech football league.

== League standings ==
Pos	Team	Pld	W	D	L	GF	GA	GD	Pts	Promotion or relegation
1	Viktoria Plzeň (C, P)	30	17	7	6	47	27	+20	58	Promotion to 2003–04 1. Liga
2	Jihlava	30	16	4	10	43	28	+15	52	
3	Mladá Boleslav	30	13	11	6	37	22	+15	50	
4	Xaverov	30	15	4	11	41	43	−2	49	
5	Opava (P)	30	12	9	9	51	35	+16	45 (Note: OPA 2–0 VIT; VIT 2–1 OPA)	Promotion to 2003–04 1. Liga
6	Vítkovice	30	13	6	11	39	33	+6	45	
7	Kunovice	30	11	10	9	41	34	+7	43	
8	Prostějov (R)	30	11	8	11	43	37	+6	41 (Note: PRO 3–1 HFK; HFK 2–0 PRO)	Relegation to 2003–04 MSFL (Note: Prostějov subsequently resigned from the league and were replaced by Brno B for the following season.)
9	HFK Olomouc	30	10	11	9	42	43	−1	41	
10	Most	30	9	11	10	28	30	−2	38	
11	Pardubice	30	9	8	13	37	48	−11	35 (Note: PAR 1–0 SPA; SPA 1–3 PAR)	
12	Sparta Prague B	30	9	8	13	29	38	−9	35	
13	Neratovice (R)	30	7	13	10	25	26	−1	34 (Note: NER 3–0 SIG; SIG 2–1 NER)	Relegation to 2003–04 ČFL
14	Sigma Olomouc B	30	10	4	16	34	50	−16	34	
15	Chomutov (R)	30	9	5	16	35	57	−22	32	Relegation to 2003–04 ČFL
16	D. Kounice (R)	30	5	9	16	33	54	−21	24	Relegation to 2003–04 MSFL

Source: The Football Association of the Czech Republic
Rules for classification: 1) points; 2) head-to-head points; 3) head-to-head goal difference; 4) head-to-head goals scored; 5) goal difference; 6) number of goals scored.
(C) Champions; (P) Promoted; (R) Relegated

== Top goalscorers ==
Rank	Scorer	Club	Goals
1	(Czech Republic) Petr Švancara	Opava	20
2	(Czech Republic) Pavel Fořt	Viktoria Plzeň	15
3	(Czech Republic) Petr Smíšek	Viktoria Plzeň	13
4	(Czech Republic) Petr Faldyna	Kunovice	12
5	(Czech Republic) Lubomír Myšák	Xaverov	10

== See also ==
- 2002–03 Czech First League
- 2002–03 Czech Cup
