= Henning Grieneisen =

German footballer

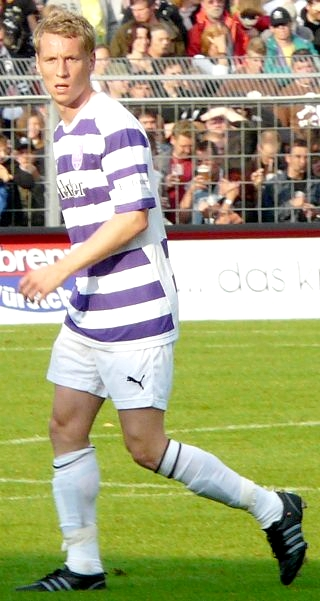
- Grieneisen with VfL Osnabrück

Personal information
- Date of birth: 9 September 1984 (age 42)
- Place of birth: Arolsen, West Germany
- Height: 1.75 m (5 ft 9 in)
- Position: Midfielder

Youth career
- 1991–1997: VfB Salzkotten
- 1997–2001: SC Paderborn
- 2001–2003: Arminia Bielefeld

Senior career*
Years	Team	Apps	(Gls)
2003–2005	Arminia Bielefeld II	24	(4)
2004–2005	Arminia Bielefeld	1	(0)
2005–2007	Holstein Kiel	42	(2)
2007–2010	VfL Osnabrück	60	(2)
2010–2011	Werder Bremen II	19	(1)
2011–2014	Sportfreunde Lotte	73	(7)
2014–2015	Sportfreunde Lotte	12	(1)
2015	TuS Bersenbrück	4	(1)
Total		235	(18)

Managerial career
- 2014–2015: Sportfreunde Lotte (interim)
- * Club domestic league appearances and goals

Henning Grieneisen (born 9 September 1984) is a German former professional footballer who played as a midfielder.

== Career ==
Grieneisen made his debut on the professional league level in the Bundesliga for Arminia Bielefeld on 28 September 2004 when he came on as a substitute in the 90th minute in a game against Hannover 96.
