= Darlington Omodiagbe =

Nigerian footballer

Personal information
- Date of birth: 2 July 1978 (age 48)
- Place of birth: Warri, Nigeria
- Height: 1.90 m (6 ft 3 in)
- Position: Midfielder

Senior career*
Years	Team	Apps	(Gls)
–1995	NPA Port Harcourt		
1996–1997	Iwuanyanwu Nationale		
1997	Polonia Gdańsk		
1998–1999	ŁKS Łódź	26	(1)
1999	FC Gütersloh	13	(2)
1999	ŁKS Łódź	6	(0)
1999–2000	Hannover 96	12	(0)
2000–2001	MSV Duisburg	17	(0)
2001–2002	Piotrcovia Piotrków Trybunalski		
2002–2007	SpVgg Unterhaching	148	(9)
2007–2008	Carl Zeiss Jena	21	(4)
2008–2009	VfL Osnabrück	22	(0)
2009–2010	Rot Weiss Ahlen	9	(0)
2010–2014	SV Wacker Burghausen	72	(5)
- * Club domestic league appearances and goals

Darlington Omodiagbe (born 2 July 1978 in Warri) is a Nigerian former professional footballer who played as a midfielder.

Omodiagbe has played in Germany for much of his career, with spells in Poland. In the 2010–11 season he was relegated from the 3. Liga with SV Wacker Burghausen, which was his fifth relegation in five seasons, each with a different club. He had previously gone down with Rot Weiss Ahlen (2009–10), VfL Osnabrück (2008–09), Carl Zeiss Jena (2007–08), and SpVgg Unterhaching (2006–07). Each of these previous four relegations had been from the 2. Bundesliga. He had also been relegated from this level in 1998–99, with FC Gütersloh.

== Honours ==
ŁKS Łódź

- Ekstraklasa: 1997–98
