= Martin Hauswald =

German footballer

Personal information
- Full name: Martin Hauswald
- Date of birth: 3 March 1982 (age 44)
- Place of birth: Sebnitz, Bezirk Dresden, East Germany
- Height: 1.68 m (5 ft 6 in)
- Position: Midfielder

Youth career
- –1999: Dresdner SC

Senior career*
Years	Team	Apps	(Gls)
2000	FV Dresden-Nord	11	(6)
2000–2001	Tennis Borussia Berlin	18	(2)
2001–2002	FV Dresden-Nord	34	(13)
2002–2004	Rot-Weiss Essen	30	(5)
2004	→ Preußen Münster (loan)	15	(6)
2004–2005	Union Berlin	33	(5)
2005–2007	Eintracht Braunschweig	25	(0)
2007	Holstein Kiel	11	(2)
2007–2011	Rot-Weiss Erfurt	117	(11)
2011–2012	Eintracht Trier	12	(2)
2012–2013	ZFC Meuselwitz	20	(3)
2013–2015	Wacker Nordhausen	58	(11)
Total		384	(66)
- * Club domestic league appearances and goals

Martin Hauswald (born 3 March 1982) is a German former professional footballer who played as a midfielder.

== Career ==
Born in Sebnitz, Hauswald started his career at FV Dresden-Nord, moving shortly afterwards for 150,000 Deutsche Mark to Tennis Borussia Berlin. After they were relegated, he moved back to Dresden, played one more season there before transferring to Rot-Weiss Essen. After spells at SC Preußen Münster and 1. FC Union Berlin, Hauswald signed for Eintracht Braunschweig, making 25 appearances between 2005 and 2007 for the team in the 2. Bundesliga. After 11 games for Holstein Kiel, he made over 100 appearances in four years for FC Rot-Weiß Erfurt and signed for SV Eintracht Trier 05 in 2011. A year later he returned east to sign for ZFC Meuselwitz, where he spent one season before leaving in 2013, signing for Wacker Nordhausen.
