= Madjid Albry =

Nigerien footballer (born 1990)

Personal information
- Date of birth: 23 July 1990 (age 36)
- Place of birth: Belbege, Niger
- Height: 1.76 m (5 ft 9 in)
- Position: Midfielder

Youth career
- 2006–2007: FC St. Pauli
- 2007–2009: Werder Bremen

Senior career*
Years	Team	Apps	(Gls)
2009–2010	Werder Bremen III	18	(5)
2009–2010	Werder Bremen II	1	(0)
2010–2011	FC Oberneuland	6	(0)
2010–2011	FC Oberneuland II	1	(0)
2011–2012	Altona 93	37	(7)
2012–2013	TBS Pinneberg		
2013–2014	SV Rugenbergen	9	(0)
2014–2015	USC Paloma	1	(0)
2015	Wedeler TSV	6	(0)
2015–2016	TBS Pinneberg		
2016–2017	FC Elmshorn		
2017–2019	VfL Pinneberg	27	(1)
- * Club domestic league appearances and goals

Madjid Albry (born 23 July 1990) is a Nigerien former professional footballer who played as a midfielder.

== Career ==
Born in Belbege, Niger, Albry began his career with German club FC St. Pauli before signing a contract with Werder Bremen on 1 July 2007. He made his debut for Werder Bremen II on 15 September 2009 in the 3. Liga against Kickers Offenbach. On 21 May 2010, it was confirmed that his contract would not be renewed and he could leave the club on 30 June 2010.

On 23 January 2010, it was announced he had signed with FC Oberneuland. In January 2011 he joined Altona 93.
