= Yannis Becker =

German footballer (born 1991)

Personal information
- Date of birth: 12 January 1991 (age 35)
- Place of birth: Rotenburg an der Wümme, Germany
- Height: 1.80 m (5 ft 11 in)
- Positions: Left-back; defensive midfielder

Team information
- Current team: Viktoria Berlin
- Number: 23

Youth career
- 1996–2003: VfL Sittensen
- 2003–2010: Werder Bremen

College career
Years	Team	Apps	(Gls)
2012–2017	Fort Lewis College		

Senior career*
Years	Team	Apps	(Gls)
2010–2011	Werder Bremen II	16	(1)
2011–2012	Stuttgarter Kickers	28	(4)
2011–2012	Stuttgarter Kickers II	1	(1)
2017–2018	TB Uphusen	37	(4)
2018–2019	BSV Rehden	32	(2)
2019–2021	Viktoria Berlin	45	(6)
- * Club domestic league appearances and goals as of 15:58, 5 January 2022 (UTC)

Yannis Becker (born 12 January 1991) is a German professional footballer who most recently played as a left-back or defensive midfielder for Viktoria Berlin.

== Career ==
Becker was one of four players to leave 3. Liga club Viktoria Berlin in the winter transfer window 2021–22 due to "personal reasons".
