= Alexander Hessel =

German footballer

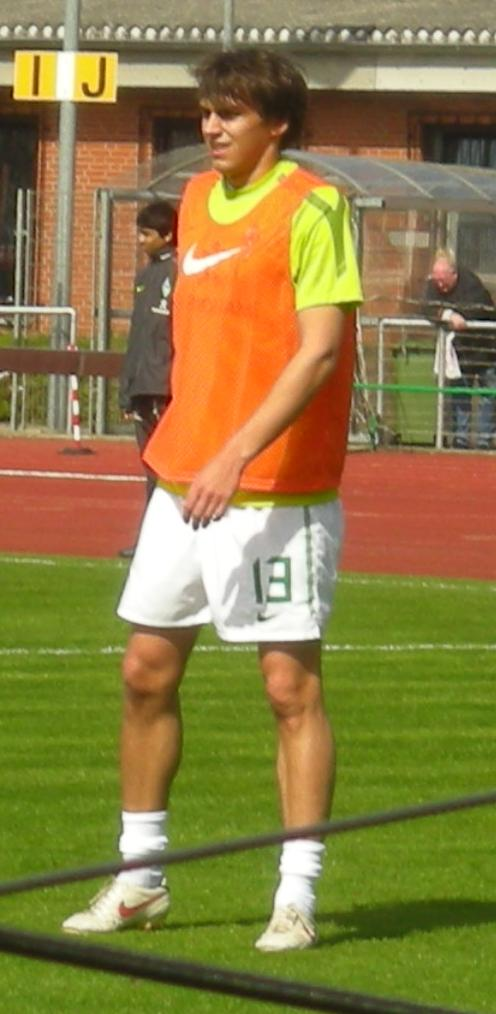
- Hessel in 2011

Personal information
- Date of birth: 26 May 1988 (age 38)
- Place of birth: Röbel, East Germany
- Height: 1.89 m (6 ft 2 in)
- Position: Centre-back

Youth career
- 1994–2002: PSV Röbel-Müritz
- 2002–2005: 1. FC Neubrandenburg
- 2005–2007: Werder Bremen

Senior career*
Years	Team	Apps	(Gls)
2006–2011	Werder Bremen II	72	(2)
2011–2012	TuS Heeslingen	32	(6)
2012–2013	FC Oberneuland	7	(1)
2013–2017	Germania Egestorf/Langreder	34	(3)
Total		145	(12)

International career
2007	Germany U19	3	(0)
2007	Germany U20	1	(0)
- * Club domestic league appearances and goals

Alexander Hessel (born 26 May 1988) is a German former professional footballer who plays as a centre-back.

== Career ==
Hessel made his professional debut for Werder Bremen II in the 3. Liga on 9 August 2008, coming on as a substitute in the 78th minute for Niklas Andersen in the 4–3 home win against SV Sandhausen.
