= Sebastian Glasner =

German footballer

Personal information
- Date of birth: 6 May 1985 (age 41)
- Place of birth: Treuchtlingen, West Germany
- Height: 1.87 m (6 ft 1 1/2 in)
- Position: Striker

Team information
- Current team: Quelle Fürth
- Number: 11

Youth career
- 1991–2000: TSG Pappenheim
- 2000–2003: 1. FC Nürnberg

Senior career*
Years	Team	Apps	(Gls)
2003–2005	1. FC Nürnberg II	36	(6)
2005–2007	Wormatia Worms	51	(11)
2007–2008	SV Darmstadt 98	34	(21)
2008–2011	Erzgebirge Aue	84	(12)
2011–2012	Wacker Burghausen	32	(13)
2012–2013	Energie Cottbus	11	(0)
2013	Arminia Bielefeld	14	(2)
2013–2015	Viktoria Köln	21	(2)
2014–2015	→ Chemnitzer FC (loan)	8	(0)
2015–2017	SpVgg Bayreuth	33	(7)
2017–2018	ATSV Erlangen	29	(12)
2018–2019	SV Seligenporten	19	(12)
2019–	Quelle Fürth	21	(7)
- * Club domestic league appearances and goals as of 12 January 2021

Sebastian Glasner (born 6 May 1985) is a German footballer who plays as a striker for SG Quelle Fürth.

== Career ==
In summer 2014, Glasner joined Chemnitzer FC on loan for following 2014–15 season.
