= Roland Benschneider =

German footballer (born 1980)

Personal information
- Date of birth: 22 August 1980 (age 46)
- Place of birth: Neuruppin, East Germany
- Height: 2.00 m (6 ft 7 in)
- Positions: Left-back; centre-back

Team information
- Current team: Energie Cottbus (sports director)

Youth career
- FC Neubrandenburg
- Energie Cottbus

Senior career*
Years	Team	Apps	(Gls)
2000–2001	Tennis Borussia Berlin II	12	(0)
2000–2001	Tennis Borussia Berlin	9	(1)
2001–2003	Eintracht Trier	61	(11)
2003–2004	Arminia Bielefeld	26	(0)
2004–2006	1. FC Köln II	26	(0)
2004–2006	1. FC Köln	24	(1)
2006–2010	FC Augsburg	60	(6)
2010–2011	SV Sandhausen	23	(2)
Total		241	(21)

International career
2003–2004	Germany B	3	(0)
- * Club domestic league appearances and goals

Roland Benschneider (born 22 August 1980) is a German former professional footballer, who works as sports director at FC Energie Cottbus.

== Playing career ==
Born in Neuruppin, Benschneider honed his craft as a defender with FC Neubrandenburg and FC Energie Cottbus. In the 2000–01 season he switched to the Regionalliga Nord and played for Tennis Borussia Berlin.

Only one year into his stint at Borussia, the player, who grew greatly in confidence during this period, moved to SV Eintracht Trier 05 in the Southern Regional League, where by 2002–03 he was to become a fully-fledged squad player.

In the next season he moved to Arminia Bielefeld, whose league position he helped to boost in the subsequent weeks and months. Uwe Rapolder was to notice the player, and he joined 1. FC Köln for €200,000. However, in the opening season Benschneider played only twelve full games. In the 2005–06 season he played mainly as a substitute once again, and scored his first goal against FC Schalke 04.

== Post-playing career ==
In September 2011, Benschneider was hired as team manager at SV Elversberg. He had different roles in the club, and he ended his time in the club in 2014 as sports director.

In April 2014, Benschneider joined FC Energie Cottbus where he got the job as sports director. He signed a contract until 2016.
