= Martin Pohl (footballer) =

German footballer

Personal information
- Full name: Martin Pohl
- Date of birth: 13 April 1981 (age 45)
- Place of birth: Rostock, East Germany
- Height: 1.90 m (6 ft 3 in)
- Position: Defender

Youth career
- 1987–2000: Hansa Rostock

Senior career*
Years	Team	Apps	(Gls)
2000–2007	Hansa Rostock II	138	(13)
2005–2007	Hansa Rostock	13	(0)
2007–2011	Rot-Weiß Erfurt	91	(3)
Total		242	(16)
- * Club domestic league appearances and goals

Martin Pohl (born 13 April 1981) is a German former footballer who played as a defender.
