= Mohammed Lartey =

German footballer (born 1986)

Personal information
- Full name: Philipp Mohammed Kotoku Lartey
- Date of birth: 4 December 1986 (age 39)
- Place of birth: Düsseldorf, West Germany
- Height: 1.76 m (5 ft 9 in)
- Position: Midfielder

Youth career
- –1999: Garather SV
- 1999–2001: VfL Leverkusen
- 2001–2005: Bayer Leverkusen

Senior career*
Years	Team	Apps	(Gls)
2005–2008	Bayer Leverkusen II	81	(0)
2008–2009	Holstein Kiel	31	(0)
2009–2010	Rot Weiss Ahlen	19	(1)
2010–2013	Hansa Rostock	53	(10)
Total		184	(11)
- * Club domestic league appearances and goals

Philipp Mohammed Kotoku Lartey (born 4 December 1986) is a German former professional footballer who played as a midfielder.

== Career ==
Born in Düsseldorf, Lartey began his career with Garather SV, and VfL Leverkusen.

In summer 2001, he was scouted by Bayer 04 Leverkusen. After four years on youth side for Bayer 04, he was promoted to the second team that played in the Regionalliga Nord. He left after three semi-professional years as reserve of Bayer 04 and signed a contract with Holstein Kiel in summer 2008.

The team climbed to the 3. Liga in the 2008–09 season. He became the Player of the Year 2009 in Schleswig-Holstein Award. After this successful season, he left Holstein Kiel on 12 June 2009 and signed with Rot Weiss Ahlen. After one year and the relegation of Rot-Weiss Ahlen, he signed on 10 June 2010 to FC Hansa Rostock on a one-year contract.

== Personal life ==
Lartey holds both a Ghanaian passport and a German passport.

== Honours ==
- 2009: Player of the Year in Schleswig-Holstein
