= Olivier Caillas =

German footballer and manager

Personal information
- Full name: Olivier Caillas
- Date of birth: 2 December 1977 (age 48)
- Place of birth: Homburg/Saar, West Germany
- Height: 1.80 m (5 ft 11 in)
- Position: Midfielder

Youth career
- 1984–1988: SV Blickweiler
- 1988–1996: FC Homburg

Senior career*
Years	Team	Apps	(Gls)
1996–1998	FC Homburg	23	(1)
1998–2000	1. FC Saarbrücken	55	(1)
2000–2002	Alemannia Aachen	47	(3)
2002–2005	Greuther Fürth	88	(12)
2005–2006	Grenoble	27	(2)
2006–2007	Greuther Fürth	23	(2)
2007	SV Wehen Wiesbaden	9	(0)
2008–2010	Fortuna Düsseldorf	62	(3)
2010–2012	Rot-Weiß Erfurt	64	(7)
2012–2014	Schalke 04 II	66	(10)
2014–2015	TuS 64 Bösinghoven	10	(0)
2015–2016	TSV Meerbusch	2	(0)
Total		476	(41)

Managerial career
- 2014–2016: TSV Meerbusch
- * Club domestic league appearances and goals

Olivier Caillas (born 2 December 1977) is a German football manager and former player.

== Personal life ==
Caillas was born in Homburg, Saarland. From 2009, he studied Business economics in distance learning at the EFH Hamburg.
