= Nermin Čeliković =

Bosnian-Herzegovinian footballer

Personal information
- Date of birth: 27 November 1980 (age 45)
- Place of birth: Cologne, West Germany
- Height: 1.79 m (5 ft 10 in)
- Position: Midfielder

Youth career
- Fortuna Köln

Senior career*
| Years | Team | Apps | (Gls) |
| 1999–2004 | 1. FC Köln II | 148 | (48) |
| 2004–2006 | Eintracht Braunschweig | 41 | (5) |
| 2006 | Kickers Emden | 14 | (7) |
| 2007 | SV Wehen Wiesbaden | 2 | (0) |
| 2007–2008 | Kickers Emden | 33 | (2) |
| 2008–2010 | Wuppertaler SV Borussia | 39 | (6) |
| 2014–2015 | FC Leverkusen | 5 | (2) |
- * Club domestic league appearances and goals

Nermin Čeliković (born 27 November 1980) is a Bosnian-Herzegovinian former footballer who played as a midfielder. Born in Cologne, he played his entire career in the German lower leagues, but had one season in the 2. Bundesliga with Eintracht Braunschweig.
