= Régis Dorn =

French footballer (born 1979)

Personal information
- Date of birth: 22 December 1979 (age 46)
- Place of birth: Ingwiller, France
- Height: 1.84 m (6 ft 0 in)
- Position: Striker

Youth career
- AS Weiterswiller

Senior career*
Years	Team	Apps	(Gls)
–1997	AS Ingwiller		
1997–1998	Mulhouse		
1998–1999	FCSR Haguenau	5	(2)
1999–2000	Strasbourg	6	(1)
2000–2002	SC Freiburg	21	(4)
2002–2003	Amiens	5	(0)
2003–2004	Shanghai Cosco		
2004–2005	SC Freiburg	16	(2)
2005–2006	Kickers Offenbach	48	(16)
2007–2009	Hansa Rostock	39	(5)
2009–2013	SV Sandhausen	82	(31)
Total		222	(61)
- * Club domestic league appearances and goals

Régis Dorn (born 22 December 1979) is a French former professional footballer who played as a striker. He was the top scorer of the 3. Liga in 2009–10, having scored 22 goals all through the season.
