= Sebastian Patzler =

German footballer

Personal information
- Date of birth: 24 October 1990 (age 36)
- Place of birth: Berlin, Germany
- Height: 1.90 m (6 ft 3 in)
- Position: Goalkeeper

Team information
- Current team: 1. FC Bocholt
- Number: 31

Youth career
- 1996–2002: SC Bauunion Berlin
- 2002–2003: SV Lichtenberg 47
- 2003–2007: Union Berlin
- 2007–2008: 1. FC Magdeburg
- 2008–2009: Werder Bremen

Senior career*
Years	Team	Apps	(Gls)
2009–2011	Werder Bremen II	4	(0)
2011–2012	Kickers Emden	12	(0)
2012–2015	Union Berlin II	37	(0)
2015	FC Viktoria 1889	15	(0)
2015–2017	TuS Koblenz	67	(0)
2017–2020	Viktoria Köln	78	(0)
2020–2024	Wuppertaler SV	95	(0)
2024–	1. FC Bocholt	0	(0)
- * Club domestic league appearances and goals as of 25 April 2024

Sebastian Patzler (born 24 October 1990) is a German footballer who plays as a goalkeeper for 1. FC Bocholt.
