= Kai Hesse =

German footballer

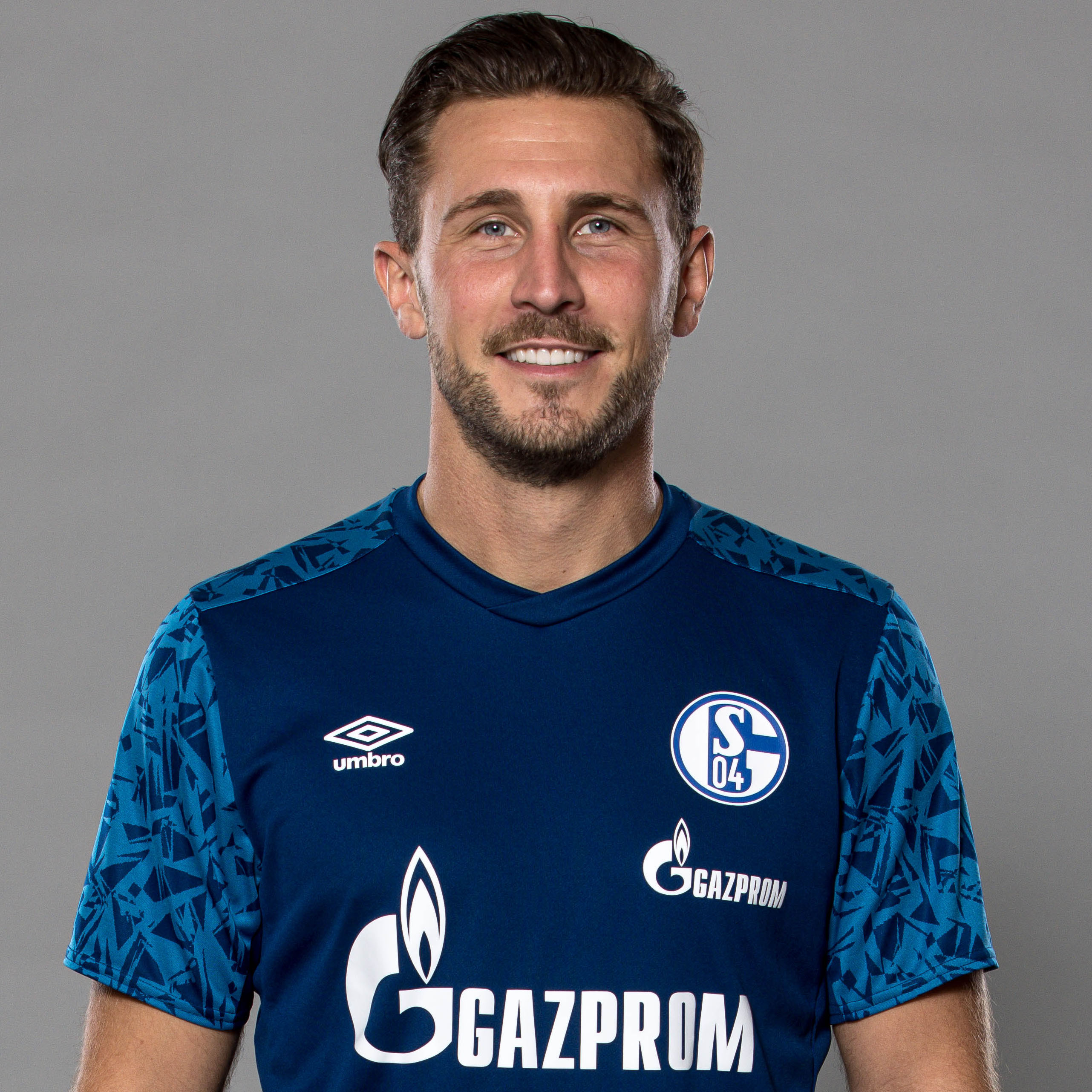
- Hesse in 2020

Personal information
- Full name: Kai Hesse
- Date of birth: 20 June 1985 (age 41)
- Place of birth: Wickede, West Germany
- Height: 1.87 m (6 ft 2 in)
- Position: Striker

Team information
- Current team: Red Bull Salzburg (assistant)

Youth career
- SF Oestrich-Iserlohn
- –2000: BSV Menden
- 2000–2004: FC Schalke 04

Senior career*
Years	Team	Apps	(Gls)
2004–2005	FC Schalke 04 II	32	(10)
2005–2006	VfB Lübeck	37	(9)
2006–2008	TSG 1899 Hoffenheim	13	(2)
2007–2008	TSG 1899 Hoffenheim II	15	(11)
2008–2009	1. FC Kaiserslautern	27	(2)
2010–2013	Kickers Offenbach	65	(14)
2014–2018	FC Homburg	92	(23)
2018–2019	SC Hessen Dreieich	18	(2)
Total		299	(73)
- * Club domestic league appearances and goals

Kai Hesse (born 20 June 1985) is a German football coach and former player, who is the assistant coach of Al Shabab.

== Career ==
Hesse was a member of the TSG 1899 Hoffenheim team that won promotion to the 2. Bundesliga.
