= Onur Ayık =

Turkish footballer (born 1990)

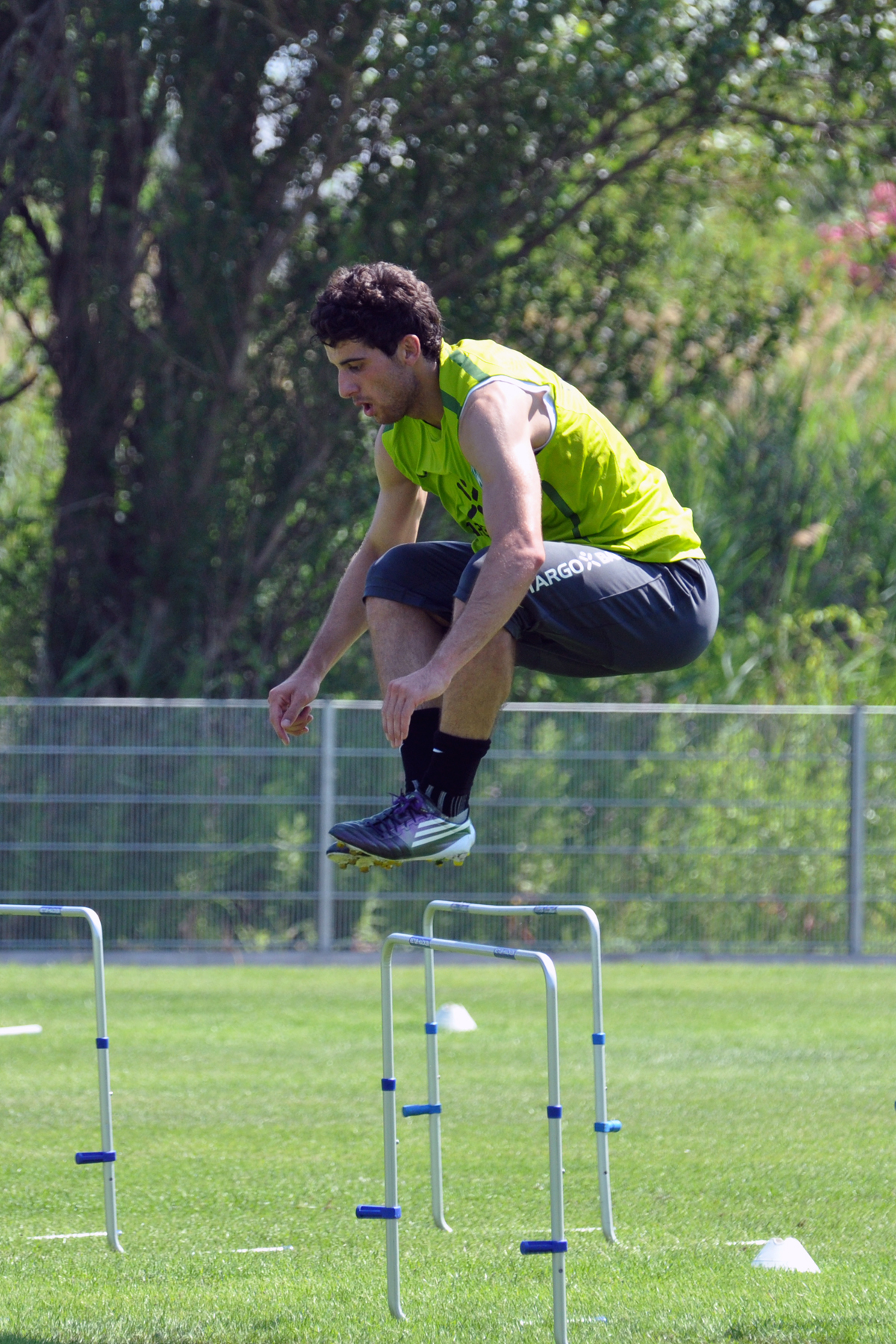
- Ayık training with Werder Bremen in 2010

Personal information
- Date of birth: 28 January 1990 (age 36)
- Place of birth: Walsrode, West Germany
- Height: 1.83 m (6 ft 0 in)
- Positions: Winger; forward

Youth career
- 1995–2004: Viktoria Rethem
- 2004–2009: Werder Bremen

Senior career*
Years	Team	Apps	(Gls)
2008–2012	Werder Bremen II	67	(12)
2010–2012	Werder Bremen	2	(0)
2013	FC Oberneuland	13	(4)
2013–2014	Elazığspor	23	(3)
2014–2015	Karabükspor	20	(2)
2015–2020	Akhisarspor	109	(8)
2020–2021	Tuzlaspor	13	(2)
2021–2024	Ümraniyespor	95	(14)

International career
2006	Turkey U16	4	(0)
2007–2008	Turkey U18	6	(3)
2008–2009	Turkey U19	11	(4)
2013	Turkey U23	0	(0)
- * Club domestic league appearances and goals as of 10 May 2024

Onur Ayık (born 28 January 1990) is a Turkish professional footballer who plays as a winger. Born in Germany, he has represented Turkey internationally at various youth levels.

== Career ==
=== Werder Bremen ===
Born in Walsrode, West Germany, Ayık joined Werder Bremen as a youth in 2004. Having come through the youth ranks, he intiagiily played for the club's reserves.

In February 2010, he made his first-team debut in the Bundesliga. On 24 November 2010, he made his first appearance in the UEFA Champions League for the first team against Tottenham Hotspur

=== Unsuccessful trials and Oberneuland ===
After his contract with Werder Bremen expired in summer 2012, Ayık became a free agent and had unsuccessful trials with SC Paderborn 07, Dynamo Dresden, Preußen Münster, and Halle. Having signed a pre contract with a Süper Lig club for summer 2013, he played for German fourth-tier side FC Oberneuland in the second half of the 2012–13 season.

=== In Turkey ===
In June 2013, Ayık's move to Elazığspor was announced.

On 10 May 2018, Onur helped Akhisar Belediyespor win their first professional trophy, the 2017–18 Turkish Cup.

== Career statistics ==
As of 1 July 2021

Appearances and goals by club, season and competition
Club	Season	League			Cup		Continental		Other		Total	
Club	Season	Division	Apps	Goals	Apps	Goals	Apps	Goals	Apps	Goals	Apps	Goals
Werder Bremen	2009–10	Bundesliga	1	0	0	0	1	0	–		2	0
Werder Bremen	2010–11	Bundesliga	1	0	0	0	1	0	–		2	0
Werder Bremen	Total		2	0	0	0	2	0	0	0	4	0
FC Oberneuland	2012–13	Regionalliga	13	4	—		—		–		13	4
Elazığspor	2013–14	Süper Lig	23	3	5	0	—		–		28	3
Karabükspor	2014–15	Süper Lig	20	2	4	2	2	0	–		26	4
Akhisarspor	2015–16	Süper Lig	22	2	8	1	–		–		30	3
Akhisarspor	2016–17	Süper Lig	25	0	5	0	–		–		30	0
Akhisarspor	2017–18	Süper Lig	17	1	6	0	–		–		23	1
Akhisarspor	2018–19	Süper Lig	23	1	3	0	6	2	–		32	3
Akhisarspor	2019–20	TFF First League	22	4	0	0	–		1 (Note: Appearance in the Turkish Super Cup)	0	32	3
Akhisarspor	Total		109	8	22	1	6	2	1	0	138	11
Tuzlaspor	2020–21	TFF First League	13	2	1	0	–		–		14	2
Career total			180	19	32	3	10	2	1	0	223	24

== Honours ==
Akhisarspor

- Turkish Cup: 2017–18
- Turkish Super Cup: 2018
