= Andreas Spann =

German footballer

Personal information
- Date of birth: May 17, 1984 (age 42)
- Place of birth: Ulm, West Germany
- Height: 1.84 m (6 ft 0 in)
- Position: Striker

Team information
- Current team: FV Illertissen

Youth career
- SSV Ulm 1846
- 2000–2003: Borussia Mönchengladbach

Senior career*
Years	Team	Apps	(Gls)
2003–2007	Borussia M'gladbach II	71	(4)
2003–2005	Borussia M'gladbach	1	(0)
2007–2013	1. FC Heidenheim 1846	119	(38)
2013–2014	VfL Osnabrück	19	(2)
2014–	FV Illertissen	2	(0)
- * Club domestic league appearances and goals as of 22 July 2014

Andreas Spann (born 17 May 1984) is a German former football player who played as a forward. Born in Ulm, he spent three seasons in the Bundesliga with Borussia Mönchengladbach. In April 2000, he went on trial with English club Manchester United.
