= Petr Stoilov =

Czech footballer

Personal information
- Full name: Petr Stoilov
- Date of birth: 30 August 1975 (age 51)
- Place of birth: Plzeň, Czechoslovakia
- Height: 1.90 m (6 ft 3 in)
- Position: Forward

Team information
- Current team: Černice Plzeň

Senior career*
Years	Team	Apps	(Gls)
1996–1997	Viktoria Plzeň	8	(0)
1997–1998	TJ Přestice		
1998–1999	NK Zadar	2	(0)
	Makedonija GP	2	
1999–2006	1. FC Bad Kötzting		
2006–2011	Jahn Regensburg	163	(44)
2011–2012	1. FC Bad Kötzting		
2012–	Černice Plzeň		
- * Club domestic league appearances and goals as of 25 April 2011

Petr Stoilov (born 30 August 1975 in Plzeň) is a Czech professional footballer who plays for Černice Plzeň.

He played in the Czech First League for FC Viktoria Plzeň, making eight appearances in the 1996–97 season. He also played for TJ Přestice before going to Croatia to have a short spell with NK Zadar in the Croatian First League. Afterwards, he had a spell with FK Makedonija Gjorče Petrov in the Macedonian First League before moving to Germany where he played seven seasons with 1. FC Bad Kötzting. He joined SSV Jahn Regensburg in 2006, returning to Bad Kötzting five years later.
