= Addy-Waku Menga =

Congolese footballer (born 1983)

Personal information
- Full name: Ardiles-Waku Menga
- Date of birth: 28 September 1983 (age 43)
- Place of birth: Kinshasa, Zaire
- Height: 1.82 m (6 ft 0 in)
- Position: Striker

Team information
- Current team: Sportfreunde Lotte
- Number: 13

Youth career
- Amis Luanga
- 2000–2001: TSV Venne

Senior career*
Years	Team	Apps	(Gls)
2001–2007	VfL Osnabrück	110	(35)
2007–2008	Hansa Rostock	16	(1)
2008	Hansa Rostock II	14	(7)
2009–2010	Werder Bremen II	43	(7)
2010–2012	Wehen Wiesbaden	44	(7)
2012–2013	Preußen Münster	16	(2)
2013–2014	VfB Oldenburg	32	(23)
2014–2017	VfL Osnabrück	78	(15)
2017–2022	BSV Rehden	95	(31)
2022–	Sportfreunde Lotte	20	(3)
- * Club domestic league appearances and goals as of 00:29, 5 December 2023 (UTC)

Ardiles-Waku Menga (born 28 September 1983) is a Congolese professional footballer who plays as a striker for German club Sportfreunde Lotte.

== Career ==
Born in Kinshasa, Menga grew up in Germany, playing youth football for TSV Venne. He began his professional career in 2001 with VfL Osnabrück, where he was topscorer in the 2006–07 season with 15 goals. He moved to Hansa Rostock in 2007, but was released on 15 December 2008. He signed for Werder Bremen II on 7 January 2009, but he was released at the end of the 2009–10 season, later signing with SV Wehen Wiesbaden. On 18 September 2012, he joined SC Preußen Münster.
