= Michael Holt (German footballer) =

German footballer

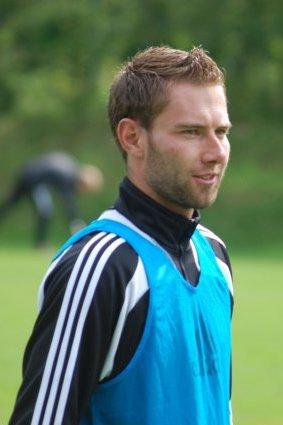
- Holt in 2009

Personal information
- Date of birth: 1 February 1986 (age 40)
- Place of birth: Haselünne, West Germany
- Height: 1.85 m (6 ft 1 in)
- Positions: Attacking midfielder; forward

Youth career
- 1991–1998: SV Bokeloh
- 1998–2005: SV Meppen

Senior career*
Years	Team	Apps	(Gls)
2005–2007	SV Meppen	63	(29)
2007–2010	Holstein Kiel	76	(43)
2010–2011	Wuppertaler SV	29	(10)
2011–2013	SV Meppen	58	(23)
2013–2015	Preußen Münster	1	(0)
2014	→ SSVg Velbert (loan)	13	(1)
2015–2017	Holstein Kiel II	23	(2)
2017–2018	TSV Schilksee	4	(0)
Total		267	(108)
- * Club domestic league appearances and goals

Michael Holt (born 1 February 1986) is a German former professional footballer who played as a striker.

== Career ==
Holt began his career with SV Meppen, breaking into the first team in 2005. He scored on his debut on the opening day of the 2005–06 season, a 3–2 win over Eintracht Nordhorn. He scored ten goals in the Oberliga Nord in his first season, and was the club's top scorer the following year, with 19. He signed for Holstein Kiel in 2007, and immediately helped them win the Oberliga Nord, again as the club's top scorer with 22 goals.

Kiel were promoted to the Regionalliga Nord, but Holt missed much of the 2008–09 season due to injury. Despite this, he managed eight goals in 15 games, as the club won the title, and a second consecutive promotion. He made his 3. Liga debut in the second game of the 2009–10 season, as a substitute for Alexander Nouri in a 1–0 defeat to Wacker Burghausen. He ended the season with 14 goals, but this was not enough to prevent Kiel being relegated in 19th place.

Holt then left Kiel, joining the club that had finished below them, Wuppertaler SV. He spent one season with the Regionalliga West club, scoring 10 goals, before returning to SV Meppen, now in the Regionalliga Nord. After two years in which he was again the club's top scorer (with 11 and 12 goals respectively) he signed for Preußen Münster of the 3. Liga in July 2013. He joined SSVg Velbert on a six-month loan in January 2014.
