= Björn Hertl =

German footballer

Personal information
- Date of birth: 10 August 1976 (age 50)
- Place of birth: Miltenberg, West Germany
- Height: 1.80 m (5 ft 11 in)
- Position: Midfielder

Team information
- Current team: TSV Ampfing (manager)

Youth career
- 1983–1986: TSV Rosenberg
- 1986–1988: TSV Holzkirchen

Senior career*
Years	Team	Apps	(Gls)
1988–1996	SpVgg Unterhaching II		
1996–2001	SpVgg Unterhaching	67	(2)
2001–2011	SV Wacker Burghausen	267	(15)
2011–2012	TSV Buchbach	22	(2)

Managerial career
- 2013–2014: TSV Ampfing (caretaker)
- 2024–: TSV Ampfing
- * Club domestic league appearances and goals

Björn Hertl (born 10 August 1976) is a German football manager and a former player. He is the manager of TSV Ampfing. He spent two seasons in the Bundesliga with SpVgg Unterhaching.
