= Kevin Maek =

German footballer

Personal information
- Date of birth: 4 November 1988 (age 37)
- Place of birth: East Berlin, East Germany
- Height: 1.89 m (6 ft 2 in)
- Positions: Centre-back; defensive midfielder

Team information
- Current team: Einheit Zepernick

Youth career
- FC Nordost Berlin
- 2000–2006: Tennis Borussia Berlin
- 2006–2007: VfL Wolfsburg

Senior career*
Years	Team	Apps	(Gls)
2007–2008	VfL Wolfsburg II	10	(0)
2008–2009	Union Berlin	10	(0)
2009–2011	Werder Bremen II	52	(3)
2011–2012	Alemannia Aachen	0	(0)
2011	Alemannia Aachen II	4	(0)
2012–2014	1. FC Saarbrücken	39	(2)
2014–2018	SV Elversberg	92	(16)
2017	SV Elversberg II	1	(0)
2018–2020	FC Homburg	40	(8)
Total		248	(29)
- * Club domestic league appearances and goals

Kevin Maek (born 4 November 1988) is a German former professional footballer who played as a centre-back. He is the son of Mario Maek.
