= Orlando Smeekes =

Curaçaoan footballer (born 1981)

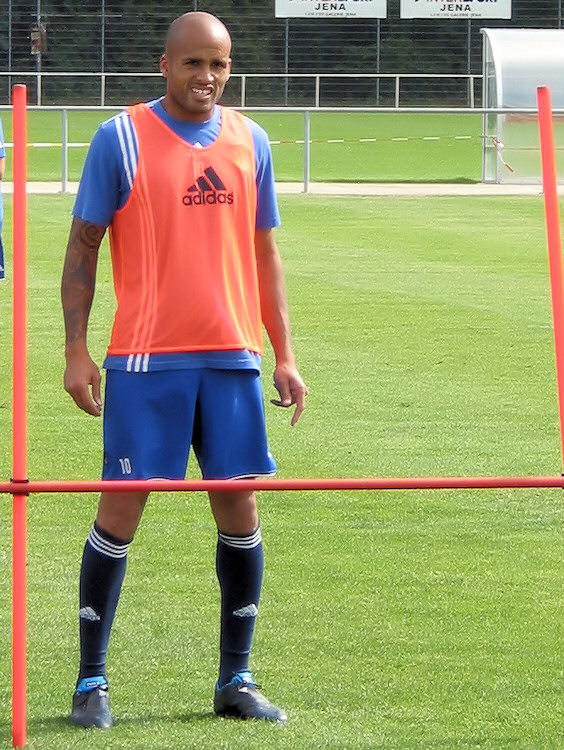
- Smeekes in 2009

Personal information
- Full name: Orlando Smeekes
- Date of birth: 28 December 1981 (age 44)
- Place of birth: Amsterdam, Netherlands
- Height: 1.83 m (6 ft 0 in)
- Position: Winger

Youth career
- Flevo Boys
- SC Heerenveen

Senior career*
Years	Team	Apps	(Gls)
2000–2003	Stormvogels Telstar	50	(10)
2003–2004	FC Volendam	2	(0)
2004–2005	TOP Oss	26	(2)
2005–2007	Helmond Sport	48	(9)
2007–2008	Go Ahead Eagles	23	(5)
2008–2009	Stuttgarter Kickers	29	(4)
2009–2011	Carl Zeiss Jena	65	(20)
2011–2012	Wehen Wiesbaden	14	(0)
2012–2014	Maritzburg United	35	(5)
2014–2015	WKE	19	(2)
2015–2016	Den Bosch	6	(0)
Total		317	(57)

International career
2008	Netherlands Antilles	4	(0)
2011	Curaçao	2	(0)
- * Club domestic league appearances and goals

Orlando Smeekes (born 28 December 1981) is a Curaçaoan former professional footballer who played as a winger.

== Club career ==
Smeekes was born in Amsterdam, Netherlands. On 10 September 2008, he left Go Ahead Eagles and moved to German 3. Liga club Stuttgarter Kickers. After the relegation of Kickers he signed with FC Carl Zeiss Jena on 26 June 2009. In July 2010 joined for a trial week at Coventry City, which did not result in a full-time contract. He had further trials at Charlton Athletic with similar success. On 21 March 2011, he signed a contract with SV Wehen Wiesbaden and joined the club on 30 June 2011. He joined South African club Maritzburg United on 26 June 2012.

== International career ==
Smeekes made two appearances for the Curaçao national team and four for the Netherlands Antilles national team.
