= Nils Pfingsten-Reddig =

German footballer

Personal information
- Date of birth: May 23, 1982 (age 44)
- Place of birth: Gehrden, West Germany
- Height: 1.78 m (5 ft 10 in)
- Position: Central midfielder

Youth career
- TSV Barsinghausen
- TSV Havelse
- Sportfreunde Ricklingen
- –2000: Hannover 96

Senior career*
Years	Team	Apps	(Gls)
2000–2004	Hannover 96 II	34	(3)
2004–2006	Wuppertaler SV	66	(7)
2006–2008	Sportfreunde Siegen	62	(9)
2008–2009	Kickers Emden	37	(4)
2009–2010	Kickers Offenbach	33	(2)
2010–2014	Rot-Weiß Erfurt	139	(34)
2014–2020	Wacker Nordhausen	86	(22)
2018–2020	Wacker Nordhausen II	60	(14)
Total		517	(95)
- * Club domestic league appearances and goals

Nils Pfingsten-Reddig (born May 23, 1982) is a German retired professional footballer.
