= Petr Smíšek =

Czech footballer

Personal information
- Date of birth: 22 January 1978 (age 48)
- Place of birth: Plzeň, Czechoslovakia
- Height: 1.88 m (6 ft 2 in)
- Position: Striker

Youth career
- Viktoria Plzeň

Senior career*
Years	Team	Apps	(Gls)
?–2003	Viktoria Plzeň	59	(7)
2004–2007	Jablonec	87	(10)
2007–2009	Teplice	20	(4)
2009–2011	Erfurt	10	(1)
2014–	SK Plzeň Bukovec	0	(0)

International career^{‡}
1997	Czech Republic U20	4	(0)
- * Club domestic league appearances and goals as of 30 June 2012 ‡ National team caps and goals as of 1 September 2012

Petr Smíšek (born 22 January 1978) is a Czech footballer. His position is striker.

Smíšek spent his early career with Viktoria Plzeň, where he played 59 top-flight matches, scoring 7 goals. He finished the season as third top scorer with Plzeň in the 2002–03 Czech 2. Liga, scoring 13 goals, as the club won the division and promotion back to the Gambrinus liga. In 2003, he had a trial with 2. Fußball-Bundesliga side SV Wacker Burghausen. He ultimately signed for Jablonec, where he spent three and a half seasons, before moving on to Teplice in the summer of 2007.

He has a twin brother called Martin, who is also a footballer.
