= Niklas Andersen =

German footballer

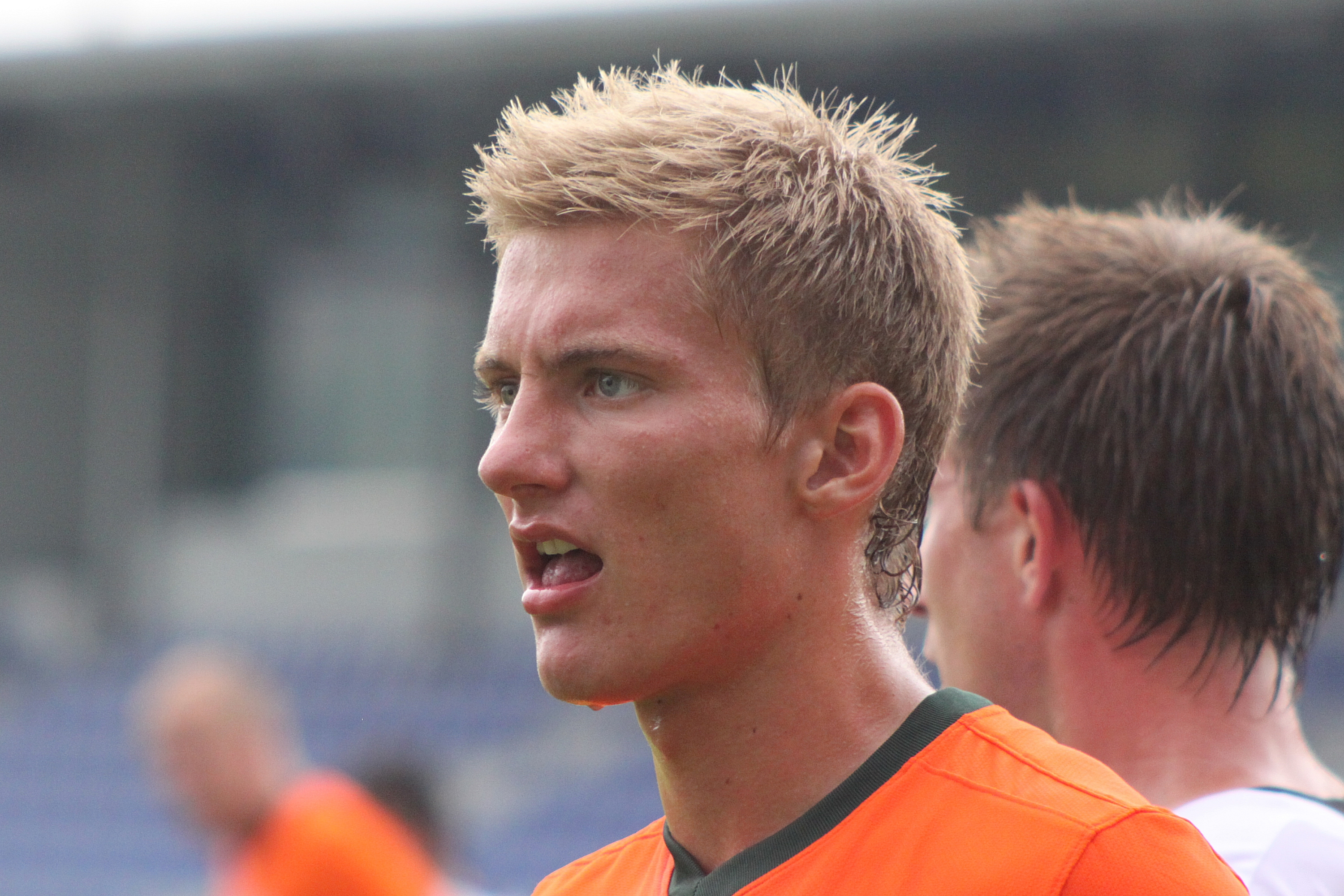
- Andersen in 2009

Personal information
- Date of birth: 4 August 1988 (age 38)
- Place of birth: Frankfurt am Main, West Germany
- Height: 1.88 m (6 ft 2 in)
- Position: Left-back

Youth career
- 1999–2001: Hamburger SV
- 2001–2003: Eintracht Frankfurt
- 2003–2005: Schalke 04
- 2005–2006: Rot-Weiß Essen

Senior career*
Years	Team	Apps	(Gls)
2006–2008	Rot-Weiss Essen	26	(0)
2008–2011	Werder Bremen II	63	(2)
2008–2011	Werder Bremen	1	(0)
2012	Chemnitzer FC	3	(0)
2012–2014	SG Wattenscheid 09	58	(3)
2014–2018	SSVg Velbert	125	(12)
Total		276	(16)

International career
2007–2008	Germany U-20	2	(0)
- * Club domestic league appearances and goals

Niklas Andersen (born 4 August 1988) is a German former professional footballer who played as a left-back. He is the son of Jørn Andersen.

== Career ==
Andersen played in the youth system of Hamburger SV, Eintracht Frankfurt and Schalke 04. He moved often, due to following his father and coach, Jørn Andersen. In 2005, he gained a foothold in Rot-Weiss Essen's A youth team and was called up in the last season for the Regionalliga team. For the 2008–09 season Andersen moved to Bundesliga club Werder Bremen where he signed a contract running until 30 June 2012. Andersen made his debut for the Werder Bremen senior team on 13 May 2009. He was substituted on in the 77th minute for Frank Baumann in a 0–5 away win against Eintracht Frankfurt. He was released by Werder in June 2011, and spent part of the summer with Charlton Athletic but did not do enough to win a deal so he signed for Chemnitzer FC half a season later, spending a year with the club before leaving on a free transfer.

== Personal life ==
He is the son of former Norway international footballer and Bundesliga top scorer Jørn Andersen.
