= SK Spolana Neratovice =

Spolana Neratovice
- Full name: SK Spolana Neratovice
- Founded: 1919
- Dissolved: 2003
- Final season 2002–03: 13th in Czech 2. Liga

SK Spolana Neratovice was a Czech football club located in Neratovice and sponsored by Spolana. The club was founded in 1919. The club won the Bohemian Football League in the 1998–99 season and subsequently played four seasons in the Czech 2. Liga. After losing the support of the town and main sponsor Spolana, the club finished in 13th place in the 2002–03 Czech 2. Liga. The club subsequently merged with SK Kladno.

== Historical names ==
- 1919 – SK Neratovice (Sportovní klub Neratovice)
- 1953 – DSO Jiskra Neratovice (Dobrovolná sportovní organizace Jiskra Neratovice)
- 1959 – TJ Spolana Neratovice (Tělovýchovná jednota Spolana Neratovice)
- 1997 – SK Spolana Neratovice (Sportovní klub Spolana Neratovice)
- 2003 – merger with SK Kladno => disbandment

== Honours ==
- Bohemian Football League (third tier)
  - Champions 1998–99
