= 2009–10 Borussia Dortmund II season =

Borussia Dortmund II
2009–10 season
- 3. Liga: 18th (relegated)

The 2009–10 Borussia Dortmund II season happened between 25 July 2009 and 8 May 2010.

== 3. Liga ==
=== Season review ===
==== July and August ====
Borussia Dortmund II opened up the season against Wacker Burghausen on 25 July 2009. Borussia Dortmund II lost the match 4–3. Borussia Dortmund II got two goals from Sebastian Tyrala and a goal from Sebastian Hille. Wacker Burghausen got three goals from Christian Holzer and a goal from Christian Cappek. Matchday two happened on 28 July 2009 against Eintracht Braunschweig. The match finished in a 0–0 draw. Matchday three happened on 7 August 2009 against Werder Bremen II. Borussia Dortmund II lost the match 1–0 with a goal from Torsten Oehrl. Matchday four happened on 15 August 2009 against Kickers Offenbach. The match finished in a 0–0 draw. Matchday five happened on 21 August 2009 against FC Ingolstadt. Borussia Dortmund II won the match 1–0 with a goal from Yasin. Matchday six happened on 28 August 2009 against SpVgg Unterhaching. Borussia Dortmund II lost the match 2–1. Borussia Dortmund II got a goal from Sebastian Hille. Sebastian Mitterhuber and Robert Zillner scored for Unterhaching.

==== September and October ====
Matchday seven happened on 2 September 2009 against Carl Zeiss Jena. Borussia Dortmund II lost the match 2–1. Jörn Neumeister scored for Borussia Dortmund II. Assani Lukimya and Marco Riemer scored for Carl Zeiss Jena. Matchday eight happened on 6 September 2009 against Dynamo Dresden. Borussia Dortmund II won 1–0 with a goal from Marcus Piossek. Matchday nine happened on 12 September 2009 against 1. FC Heidenheim. Borussia Dortmund II lost 2–1. Marcel Kandziora scored from Borussia Dortmund II. Heidenheim got a goal from the penalty spot from Johannes Meier and a goal from Bastian Heidenfelder. Matchday 10 happened on 19 September 2009 against Wuppertaler SV. Borussia Dortmund II won 2–0 with goals from Marcus Piossek and Marcel Kandziora. Matchday 11 happened on 26 September 2009 against VfB Stuttgart II. Borussia Dortmund II lost the match 2–1. Damien Le Tallec scored for Borussia Dortmund II. Stuttgart II got a goal from the penalty spot from Sebastian Rudy and a goal from Daniel Didavi. Matchday 12 happened on 3 October 2018 against Wehen Wiesbaden. The match finished in a 1–1 draw. Damien Le Tallec scored for Borussia Dortmund II and Sebastian Reinert scored for Wehen Wiesbaden. Matchday 13 happened on 17 October 2009 against SV Sandhausen. Borussia Dortmund II lost the match 3–2. Sebastian Hille and Mehmet Boztepe scored for Borussia Dortmund II. Sandhausen got two goals from Régis Dorn and a goal from Sreto Ristić. Matchday 14 happened on 24 October 2009 against Bayern Munich II. Bayern Munich II won 2–0 with goals from Daniel Sikorski and Deniz Yılmaz. Matchday 15 happened on 31 October 2009 against Erzgebirge Aue. The match finished in a 2–2 draw. David Vržogić and Marcus Piossek scored for Borussia Dortmund II. Skerdilaid Curri and Najeh Braham scored for Erzgebirge Aue.

==== November and December ====
Matchday 16 happened on 7 November 2009 against Rot-Weiß Erfurt. Borussia Dortmund II won 1–0 with a goal from Sebastian Hille. Matchday 17 happened on 21 November 2009 against VfL Osnabrück. Borussia Dortmund II lost the match 4–1. Lasse Sobiech scored for Borussia Dortmund II. Osnabrück got two goals from Aleksandar Kotuljac, a goal from Björn Lindemann, and a goal from the penalty spot from Matthias Heidrich. Matchday 18 happened on 28 November 2009 against Jahn Regensburg. Jahn Regensburg won the match 2–0 with goals from Marco Haller and Stefan Jarosch. Matchday 19 happened on 6 December 2009 against Holstein Kiel. Borussia Dortmund II won the match 1–0 with a goal from Uwe Hünemeier. Matchday 20 happened on 12 December 2009 on against Wacker Burghausen. Borussia Dortmund II won 3–0 with three goals from Daniel Ginczek. Matchday 21 happened on 19 December 2009 against Eintracht Braunschweig. Borussia Dortmund II won the match 2–1. Sebastian Tyrała and Julian Koch scored for Borussia Dortmund II. Dennis Kruppke scored for Eintracht Braunschweig.

==== February and March ====
Matchday 23 happened on 7 February 2010 against Kickers Offenbach. Borussia Dortmund II won the match 2–1. Marcus Piossek and Uwe Hünemeier scored for Borussia Dortmund II. Mirnes Mešić scored for Kickers Offenbach. Matchday 25 happened on 21 February 2010 against Unterhaching. The match finished in a 1–1 draw. Lukas Nottbeck scored for Borussia Dortmund II and Thomas Rathgeber scored for Unterhaching. Matchday 22 happened on 10 March 2010 against Werder Bremen II. Borussia Dortmund II lost the match 2–1. Uwe Hünemeier scored for Borussia Dortmund II. Tobias Kempe scored two goals for Werder Bremen II. Matchday 26 happened on 17 March 2010 Carl Zeiss Jena. Carl Zeiss Jena won the match 3–0 with two goals from Orlando Smeekes and a goal from Timo Nagy. Matchday 29 happened on 20 March 2010 against Wuppertal. Borussia Dortmund II won the match 2–0 with goals from Lukas Nottbeck and Marcel Großkreutz. Matchday 24 happened on 24 March 2010 against Ingolstadt. Ingolstadt won the match 1–0 with a goal from Fabian Gerber. Matchday 30 happened on 27 March 2010 against Stuttgart II. Borussia Dortmund II lost the match 2–1. Daniel Ginczek scored for Borussia Dortmund II. Tobias Rathgeb and Marco Pischorn scored for Stuttgart II. Matchday 31 happened on 31 March 2010 against Wehen Wiesbaden. Wehen Wiesbaden won the match 2–0 with goals from Thorsten Barg and Dominik Stroh-Engel.

==== April and May ====
Matchday 32 happened on 4 April 2010 against Sandhausen. Borussia Dortmund II won the match 2–1. Sebastian Hille scored two goals for Borussia Dortmund II. Mario Pokar scored for Sandhausen. Matchday 27 happened on 7 April 2010 against Dynamo Dresden. Borussia Dortmund II lost the match 3–2. Uwe Hünemeier and Yasin scored for Borussia Dortmund II. Dynamo Dresden got two goals from Halil Savran and a goal from Maik Kegel. Matchday 33 happened on 10 April 2010 against Bayern Munich II. Bayern Munich II won the match 3–0 with goals from Saër Sène, Deniz Yılmaz, and Tom Schütz. Matchday 34 happened on 14 April 2010 against Erzgebirge Aue. Borussia Dortmund II lost the match 3–1. Daniel Ginczek scored for Borussia Dortmund II. Eric Agyemang, Jan Hochscheidt, and Skerdilaid Curri scored for Erzgebirge Aue. Matchday 35 happened on 18 April 2010 against Rot-Weiß Erfurt. Rot-Weiß Erfurt won 1–0 with a goal from Carsten Kammlott. Matchday 28 happened on 21 April 2010 against Heidenheim. The match finished in a 1–1 draw. Mehmet Boztepe scored for Borussia Dortmund II and Dieter Jarosch scored for Rot-Weiß Erfurt. Matchday 36 happened on 24 April 2010 against Osnabrück. Osnabrück won the match 2–1. Sebastian Tyrala scored for Borussia Dortmund II. Aleksandar Kotuljac and Ricky Pinheiro scored for Osnabrück. Matchday 37 happened on 30 April 2010 against Jahn Regensburg. Borussia Dortmund II won the match 2–0 with goals from Mehmet Boztepe and Uwe Hünemeier. Matchday 38 happened on 8 May 2010 against Holstein Kiel. Borussia Dortmund II lost the match 4–3. Daniel Ginczek, Mehmet Boztepe, and Uwe Hünemeier scored for Borussia Dortmund II. Holstein Kiel got two goals from Christopher Lamprecht, and a goal each from Tim Siedschlag and Florian Meyer. Borussia Dortmund II finished the season in 18th place and were relegated.

=== Results summary ===
Overall								Home						Away					
Pld	W	D	L	GF	GA	GD	Pts	W	D	L	GF	GA	GD	W	D	L	GF	GA	GD
38	11	6	21	43	58	−15	39	7	4	8	19	20	−1	4	2	13	24	38	−14

Last updated: 6 April 2018.
Source: kicker.de

=== Results ===
MD	Date	H/A	Opponent	Res. F–A	Goalscorers		Ref.
MD	Date	H/A	Opponent	Res. F–A	Borussia Dortmund II	Opponent	Ref.
1	25 Jul	A	Wacker Burghausen	3–4	Tyrala 66', 74'; Hille 69'	Holzer 42', 75', 90'; Cappek 82'	
2	28 Jul	H	Eintracht Braunschweig	0–0	—	—	
3	7 Aug.	A	Werder Bremen II	0–1	—	Oehrl 52'	
4	15 Aug.	H	Kickers Offenbach	0–0	—	—	
5	21 Aug.	A	Ingolstadt	1–0	Yasin 33'	—	
6	28 Aug.	H	Unterhaching	1–2	Hille 58'	Mitterhuber 17'; Zillner 45'+3'	
7	2 Sep.	A	Carl Zeiss Jena	1–2	Neumeister 6'	Lukimya 13'; Riemer 79'	
8	6 Sep.	H	Dynamo Dresden	1–0	Piossek 74'	—	
9	12 Sep.	A	Heidenheim	1–2	Kandziora 71'	Meier 61' (pen.); Heidenfelder 78'	
10	19 Sep.	H	Wuppertal	2–0	Piossek 65'; Kandziora 86'	—	
11	26 Sep.	A	Stuttgart II	1–2	Le Tallec 18'	Rudy 56' (pen.); Divadi 90'	
12	3 Oct.	H	Wehen Wiesbaden	1–1	Le Tallec 65'	Reinert 89'	
13	17 Oct.	A	Sandhausen	2–3	Hille 78'; Boztepe 86'	Dorn 10', 30'; Ristić 14'	
14	24 Oct.	H	Bayern Munich II	0–2	—	Sikorski 24'; Yilmiz 89'	
15	31 Oct.	A	Erzgebirge Aue	2–2	Vržogić 9'; Piossek 64'	Curri 8'; Braham 19' (pen.)	
16	7 Nov.	H	Rot-Weiß Erfurt	1–0	Hille 5'	—	
17	21 Nov.	A	Osnabrück	1–4	Sobiech 43'	Lindemann 43'; Heidrich 65' (pen.); Kotuljac 70', 90'+1'	
18	28 Nov.	A	Jahn Regensburg	0–2	—	Haller 71'; Jarosch 87'	
19	6 Dec.	H	Holstein Kiel	1–0	Hünemeier 68'	—	
20	12 Dec.	H	Wacker Burghausen	3–0	Ginczek 6', 39', 52'	—	
21	19 Dec.	A	Eintracht Braunschweig	2–1	Tyrała 9'; Koch 69'	Kruppke 86' (pen.)	
23	7 Feb.	A	Kickers Offenbach	2–1	Piossek 11'; Hünemeier 22'	Mešić 47' (pen.)	
25	21 Feb.	A	Unterhaching	1–1	Nottbeck 57'	Rathgeber 10'	
22	10 Mar.	H	Werder Bremen II	1–2	Hünemeier 61' (pen.)	Kempe 57' (pen.), 84'	
26	17 Mar.	H	Carl Zeiss Jena	0–3	—	Smeekes 13', 45' (pen.); Timo Nagy 32'	
29	20 Mar.	A	Wuppertal	2–0	Nottbeck 61'; Großkreutz 89'	—	
24	24 Mar.	H	Ingolstadt	0–1	—	Gerber 87'	
30	27 Mar.	H	Stuttgart II	1–2	Ginczek 35'	Rathgeb 37' (pen.); Pischorn 80'	
31	31 Mar.	A	Wehen Wiesbaden	0–2	—	Barg 8'; Stroh-Engel 84'	
32	4 Apr.	H	Sandhausen	2–1	Hille 28', 43'	Pokar 51'	
27	7 Apr.	A	Dynamo Dresden	2–3	Hünemeier 69'; Yasin 90+1'	Kegel 25'; Savran 45', 52'	
33	10 Apr.	A	Bayern Munich II	0–3	—	Sène 3'; Yılmaz 30'; Schütz 42'	
34	14 Apr.	H	Erzgebirge Aue	1–3	Ginczek 31'	Agyemang 7'; Hochscheidt 20'; Curri 58'	
35	18 Apr.	A	Rot-Weiß Erfurt	0–1	—	Kammlott 11'	
28	21 Apr.	H	Heidenheim	1–1	Boztepe 30'	Jarosch 90'+2'	
36	24 Apr.	H	Osnabrück	1–2	Tyrala 33'	Kotuljac 40'; Pinheiro 78'	
37	30 Apr.	H	Jahn Regensburg	2–0	Boztepe 3'; Hünemeier 23'	—	
38	8 May	A	Holstein Kiel	3–4	Ginczek 55'; Boztepe 76'; Hünemeier 89' (pen.)	Lamprecht 6', 90'+2'; Siedschlag 12'; Meyer 32'	

== Squad statistics ==
Name	App	Goals	Booked	(yellow card) (red card)	Sent off (straight red)	Ref.
Goalkeepers
Johannes Focher	5	0	1	0	0	
Marcel Höttecke	33	0	3	0	0	
Defenders
Sven Bender	3	0	0	0	0	
Fabian Götze	8	0	0	0	0	
Marc Hornschuh	1	0	0	0	0	
Uwe Hünemeier	33	6	6	0	0	
Marcel Kandziora	16	2	0	0	0	
Cihan Kaptan	6	0	0	0	0	
Julian Koch	24	1	3	0	0	
Jörn Neumeister	16	1	3	0	0	
Marcel Schmelzer	1	0	0	0	0	
Lasse Sobiech	32	1	1	0	0	
David Vržogić	28	1	5	0	0	
Midfielders
Mihail Aleksandrov	3	0	0	0	0	
Mehmet Boztepe	14	4	0	0	0	
Christian Eggert	12	0	0	0	1	
Kai-Bastian Evers	16	0	0	0	0	
Markus Feulner	2	0	1	0	0	
Marcel Großkreutz	21	1	3	0	0	
Tamás Hajnal	1	0	0	0	0	
Nedim Hasanbegović	18	0	3	0	0	
Sebastian Hille	36	6	4	0	0	
Sebastian Kehl	1	0	1	0	0	
Damien Le Tallec	8	2	0	0	0	
Lukas Nottbeck	15	2	4	0	0	
Michael Oscislawski	17	0	1	0	0	
Ivan Paurević	1	0	0	0	0	
Marcus Piossek	31	4	3	0	0	
Marco Stiepermann	3	1	1	0	0	
Tim Treude	4	0	0	0	0	
Sebastian Tyrala	36	4	5	0	1	
Yasin	16	2	1	1	0	
Forwards
Daniel Ginczek	29	6	6	0	0	
Christopher Kullmann	30	0	2	0	0	
Dimitar Rangelov	2	0	1	0	0	
Bajram Sadrijaj	1	0	0	0	0	
