= 2008–09 DFB-Pokal =

Tournament details
- Country: Germany
- Teams: 64

Final positions
- Champions: Werder Bremen
- Runners-up: Bayer Leverkusen

Tournament statistics
- Matches played: 63
- Top goal scorer(s): Edin Džeko; Ivica Olić (6 goals each)

The 2008–09 DFB-Pokal was the 66th season of the annual German football cup competition. The competition began with the first round on 7 August 2008, and ended with Werder Bremen defeating Bayer Leverkusen, who for their part eliminated defending champions Bayern Munich in the quarter-finals, in the final at the Olympiastadion, Berlin on 30 May 2009. The winners of the 2008–09 DFB-Pokal qualified for the play-off round of the 2009–10 UEFA Europa League.

Due to a decision made in 2006, reserve teams from professional clubs were no longer allowed to compete.

== Participating clubs ==
The following 64 teams competed in the first round:

Bundesliga the 18 clubs of the 2007–08 season	2. Bundesliga; the 18 clubs of the 2007–08 season	Fußball-Regionalliga the top 4 clubs of the 2007–08 season
Arminia Bielefeld; VfL Bochum; SV Werder Bremen; FC Energie Cottbus; Borussia Dortmund; MSV Duisburg; Eintracht Frankfurt; Hamburger SV; Hannover 96; Hertha BSC; Karlsruher SC; Bayer 04 Leverkusen; FC Bayern Munich; 1. FC Nürnberg; F.C. Hansa Rostock; FC Schalke 04; VfB Stuttgart; VfL Wolfsburg	Alemannia Aachen; FC Augsburg; FC Erzgebirge Aue; SC Freiburg; SpVgg Greuther Fürth; TSG 1899 Hoffenheim; FC Carl Zeiss Jena; 1. FC Kaiserslautern; TuS Koblenz; 1. FC Köln; 1. FSV Mainz 05; Borussia Mönchengladbach; TSV 1860 Munich; Kickers Offenbach; VfL Osnabrück; SC Paderborn 07; FC St. Pauli; SV Wehen Wiesbaden	Rot-Weiß Ahlen; FSV Frankfurt; FC Ingolstadt 04; Rot-Weiß Oberhausen
Winners of 21 regional cup competitions
Baden ASV Durlach; Bavaria (Note: Finalists from the three regions with the most participating teams in their league competitions were also allowed to compete.) SpVgg Unterhaching (CW) SpVgg Ansbach; Berlin Tennis Borussia Berlin; Brandenburg SV Babelsberg 03; Bremen FC Oberneuland; Hamburg ASV Bergedorf 85 (Note: ASV Bergedorf 85 qualified as regional cup finalists because winners FC St. Pauli Reserves were not allowed to compete.); Hesse SV Darmstadt 98	Lower Rhine Rot-Weiß Essen; Lower Saxony Eintracht Nordhorn (CW) FC Hansa Lüneburg (Note: The football sections of Lüneburger SK, winner of the regional cup competition, and Lüneburger SV merged to create FC Hansa Lüneburg for the 2008–09 season.); Mecklenburg-Vorpommern TSG Neustrelitz; Middle Rhine FC Wegberg-Beeck; Rhineland SV Eintracht Trier 05; Saarland FC 08 Homburg; Saxony Chemnitzer FC	Saxony-Anhalt Hallescher FC; Schleswig-Holstein Holstein Kiel; South Baden SC Pfullendorf; Southwest SV Niederauerbach (Note: SV Niederauerbach qualified as regional cup finalists because winners 1. FC Kaiserslautern Reserves were not allowed to compete.); Thuringia Rot-Weiß Erfurt; Westphalia Preußen Münster (CW) VfB Fichte Bielefeld; Württemberg; 1. FC Heidenheim 1846

== Draw ==
The draws for the different rounds were conducted as following: For the first round, the participating teams were split into two pots. The first pot contained all teams which have qualified through their regional cup competitions, the teams which were promoted from the Regionalligen and the bottom four teams of the Second Bundesliga. Every team from this pot was drawn to a team from the second pot, which contained all remaining professional teams. The teams from the first pot were set as the home team in the process.

The two-pot scenario was also applied for the second round, with the remaining amateur teams in the first pot and the remaining professional teams in the other pot. Once one pot was empty, the remaining pairings were drawn from the other pot with the first-drawn team for a match serving as hosts. For the remaining rounds, the draw was conducted from just one pot. Any remaining amateur team were assigned as the home team if drawn against a professional team. In every other case, the first-drawn team served as hosts.

== Matches ==
Times up to 25 October 2008 and from 29 March 2009 are CEST (UTC+2). Times from 26 October 2008 to 28 March 2009 are CET (UTC+1).

=== First round ===
The draw for the first round was held on 6 July 2008. Matches were played between 7 and 10 August 2008.

7 August 2008	SV Niederauerbach	1–5	1. FC Köln	Pirmasens
20:30 CEST	Simon 27'	Report	Antar 15'; Petit 22'; Paulus 43' (o.g.); Novaković 71'; Scherz 79'	Stadium: Sportpark Husterhöhe; Attendance: 8,500; Referee: Markus Schmidt (Stuttgart)

8 August 2008	SpVgg Unterhaching	0–2	SC Freiburg	Unterhaching
20:30 CEST		Report	Jäger 41'; Abdessadki 90+1'	Stadium: Generali Sportpark; Attendance: 8,000; Referee: Tobias Welz (Wiesbaden)

8 August 2008	Preußen Münster	0–0 (a.e.t.) (5–6 p)	VfL Bochum	Münster
20:30 CEST	Penalty shootout: (penalty missed) Özkara; (penalty scored) Wissing; (penalty scored) Ivičević; (penalty scored) Loose; (penalty scored) Lauretta; (penalty scored) Talarek; (penalty missed) Remmert	Report	Penalty shootout: (penalty scored) Maltritz; (penalty scored) Šesták; (penalty scored) Pfertzel; (penalty missed) Ono; (penalty scored) Hashemian; (penalty scored) Fuchs; (penalty scored) Yahia	Stadium: Preussenstadion; Attendance: 15,500; Referee: Peter Gagelmann (Bremen)

8 August 2008	Erzgebirge Aue	0–0 (a.e.t.) (5–4 p)	FC St. Pauli	Aue
20:30 CEST	Penalty shootout: (penalty scored) Müller; (penalty scored) Yigitusagi; (penalty scored) Glasner; (penalty scored) Kos; (penalty scored) Paulus	Report	Eger (red card) 64'; Penalty shootout: (penalty scored) Bruns; (penalty scored) Ludwig; (penalty scored) Trojan; (penalty scored) Morena; (penalty missed) Ebbers	Stadium: Erzgebirgsstadion; Attendance: 8,800; Referee: Manuel Gräfe (Berlin)

8 August 2008	Kickers Offenbach	1–0	SpVgg Greuther Fürth	Offenbach
20:30 CEST	Baier 13'	Report		Stadium: Bieberer Berg; Attendance: 7,660; Referee: Wolfgang Walz (Pfedelbach)

8 August 2008	FSV Frankfurt	2–0	VfL Osnabrück	Frankfurt
20:30 CEST	Ulm 52'; Hillebrand 67'	Report	Heidrich (yellow card) 38' (yellow-red card) 59'	Stadium: Commerzbank Arena; Attendance: 3,170; Referee: Christian Dingert (Thallichtenberg)

8 August 2008	Eintracht Trier	1–3	Hertha BSC	Trier
20:30 CEST	Lacroix 27'	Report	Pantelić 9'; Lustenberger 60'; Ebert 81'	Stadium: Moselstadion; Attendance: 5,830; Referee: Guido Winkmann (Kerken)

9 August 2008	Eintracht Nordhorn	3–9	Werder Bremen	Nordhorn
15:30 CEST	Brode 36'; Novaku 81'; Narcar 90'	Report	Rosenberg 6', 31', 55', 74'; Almeida 15', 22', 50'; Sanogo 71'; Vranješ 75'	Stadium: Stadion am Heideweg; Attendance: 9,000; Referee: Marc Seemann (Essen)

9 August 2008	Holstein Kiel	0–2	Hansa Rostock	Kiel
15:30 CEST		Report	Lechleiter 22'; Schindler 83'	Stadium: Holsteinstadion; Attendance: 9,000; Referee: Norbert Grudzinski (Hamburg)

9 August 2008	SV Babelsberg 03	1–2 (a.e.t.)	Mainz 05	Babelsberg
15:30 CEST	Moritz 90+3'	Report	Feulner 90+2'; Bogavac 107'	Stadium: Karl-Liebknecht-Stadion; Attendance: 7,000; Referee: Holger Henschel (Braunschweig)

9 August 2008	Rot-Weiss Essen	1–3	Borussia Dortmund	Essen
15:30 CEST	Lorenz 18'	Report	Hajnal 14'; Kringe 60'; Valdez 70'; Sadrijaj (red card) 72'	Stadium: Georg-Melches-Stadion; Attendance: 21,000; Referee: Felix Brych (Munich)

9 August 2008	Hallescher FC	0–5	Hannover 96	Halle (Saale)
15:30 CEST		Report	Schlaudraff 10'; Balitsch 47'; Bruggink 69', 85'; Hanke 76'	Stadium: Kurt-Wabbel-Stadion; Attendance: 7,000; Referee: Lutz Wagner (Kriftel)

9 August 2008	VfB Fichte Bielefeld	1–8	Borussia Mönchengladbach	Bielefeld
15:30 CEST	Önen 66'	Report	Marin 7', 11', 17' (pen.); Colautti 9', 24'; Rösler 18', 54'; Brouwers 36'	Stadium: Schüco-Arena; Attendance: 8,100; Referee: Babak Rafati (Hannover)

9 August 2008	FC Wegberg-Beeck	1–4	Alemannia Aachen	Mönchengladbach
15:30 CEST	Meven 45'	Report	Lasnik 13'; Auer 49', 73'; Daun 90'	Stadium: Borussia-Park; Attendance: 8,499; Referee: Christian Fischer (Hemer)

9 August 2008	FC Ingolstadt	1–3	Hamburger SV	Ingolstadt
15:30 CEST	Demir 33'; Neuendorf (red card) 90+1'	Report	Olić 51', 53'; Guerrero 90+1'	Stadium: ESV-Stadion; Attendance: 11,000; Referee: Jochen Drees (Münster-Sarmsheim)

9 August 2008	FC Homburg	0–3	Schalke 04	Homburg (Saar)
19:30 CEST		Report	Farfán 45'; Altıntop 55'; Kurányi 67'	Stadium: Waldstadion; Attendance: 18,800; Referee: Michael Kempter (Sauldorf)

9 August 2008	SC Pfullendorf	0–3	Eintracht Frankfurt	Pfullendorf
19:30 CEST		Report	Chris 2' 53'; Liberopoulos 19'; Russ (yellow card) 35' (yellow-red card) 45'	Stadium: ALNO-Arena; Attendance: 7,500; Referee: Peter Sippel (Munich)

9 August 2008	Tennis Borussia Berlin	0–3	Energie Cottbus	Berlin
19:30 CEST		Report	Rangelov 20', 72'; Jelić 28'	Stadium: Mommsenstadion; Attendance: 4,000; Referee: Robert Hartmann (Ingolstadt)

9 August 2008	Carl Zeiss Jena	2–1	1. FC Kaiserslautern	Jena
19:30 CEST	Schembri 50'; Riemer 55'	Report	Lakić 78'; Bellinghausen (yellow card) 81' (yellow-red card) 82'	Stadium: Ernst-Abbe-Sportfeld; Attendance: 7,500; Referee: Georg Schalk (Augsburg)

9 August 2008	SC Paderborn	1–1 (a.e.t.) (1–3 p)	FC Augsburg	Paderborn
19:30 CEST	Güvenisik 102'; Penalty shootout: (penalty scored) Holst; (penalty missed) Damjanović; (penalty missed) Krecidlo; (penalty missed) Güvenisik	Report	Szabics 116'; Penalty shootout: (penalty scored) Szabics; (penalty scored) Werner; (penalty missed) Makarenko; (penalty scored) Thurk	Stadium: Paragon Arena; Attendance: 7,000; Referee: Michael Weiner (Giesen)

10 August 2008	SpVgg Ansbach	0–5	Karlsruher SC	Ansbach
14:30 CEST		Report	Silva 13'; Freis 16'; Iashvili 37' (pen.); Kapllani 56'; Porcello 76'	Stadium: Sportpark Ansbach; Attendance: 4,000; Referee: Florian Steuer (Menden)

10 August 2008	ASV Bergedorf 85	1–5	MSV Duisburg	Hamburg-Bergedorf
14:30 CEST	de la Cuesta 85'	Report	Wagner 10', 59'; Kouemaha 49'; Adler 71'; Salou 76'	Stadium: Sander Tannen; Attendance: 2,400; Referee: Thomas Frank (Hannover)

10 August 2008	TSG Neustrelitz	0–2	1860 Munich	Neustrelitz
14:30 CEST		Report	Lauth 22'; Kučuković 23'	Stadium: Parkstadion; Attendance: 5,000; Referee: Bibiana Steinhaus (Hannover)

10 August 2008	1. FC Heidenheim	0–3	VfL Wolfsburg	Heidenheim
14:30 CEST		Report	Grafite 54'; Sağlık 57', 75'	Stadium: Albstadion; Attendance: 7,500; Referee: Thomas Metzen (Mechernich)

10 August 2008	FC Oberneuland	1–1 (a.e.t.) (5–4 p)	TuS Koblenz	Bremen
16:00 CEST	Laabs 83'; Penalty shootout: (penalty scored) Kilicaslan; (penalty scored) Laabs; (penalty missed) Cornelius; (penalty scored) Aktas; (penalty scored) Fossi; (penalty scored) Pekrul	Report	Richter 70'; Penalty shootout: (penalty scored) Mavrič; (penalty scored) Richter; (penalty scored) Fernández; (penalty scored) Lomić; (penalty missed) Bajić; (penalty missed) Hartmann	Stadium: Vinnenweg; Attendance: 987; Referee: Thorsten Schriever (Dorum)

10 August 2008	ASV Durlach	1–2	Arminia Bielefeld	Karlsruhe
16:00 CEST	Cetinkaya 77' (pen.)	Report	Wichniarek 45+1'; Sadik 51'; Lamey (yellow card) 77' (yellow-red card) 87'	Stadium: Turmbergstadion; Attendance: 7,000; Referee: Tobias Christ (Kaiserslautern)

10 August 2008	Darmstadt 98	0–2	Wehen Wiesbaden	Darmstadt
16:00 CEST		Report	Orahovac 68'; Ahanfouf 85'	Stadium: Böllenfalltor Stadion; Attendance: 4,000; Referee: Helmut Fleischer (Sigmertshausen)

10 August 2008	Rot-Weiß Oberhausen	2–3 (a.e.t.)	Bayer Leverkusen	Oberhausen
17:30 CEST	Lüttmann 90+3'; Terranova 97'	Report	Augusto 69'; Gekas 104'; Helmes 111'	Stadium: Niederrheinstadion; Attendance: 10,117; Referee: Thorsten Kinhöfer (Herne)

10 August 2008	Chemnitzer FC	0–1	1899 Hoffenheim	Chemnitz
17:30 CEST		Report	Ibišević 77'	Stadium: Stadion an der Gellertstraße; Attendance: 6,758; Referee: Günter Perl (Pullach)

10 August 2008	FC Hansa Lüneburg	0–5	VfB Stuttgart	Lüneburg
17:30 CEST		Report	Lanig 11'; Hilbert 27'; Gómez 57', 78'; Berger 83' (o.g.)	Stadium: Wilschenbruch; Attendance: 8,500; Referee: Felix Zwayer (Berlin)

10 August 2008	Rot Weiss Ahlen	0–0 (a.e.t.) (3–4 p)	1. FC Nürnberg	Ahlen
17:30 CEST	Penalty shootout: (penalty missed) Heithölter; (penalty scored) Großkreutz; (penalty scored) Toborg; (penalty scored) Thioune; (penalty missed) Di Gregorio	Report	Penalty shootout: (penalty scored) Mnari; (penalty scored) Pinola; (penalty scored) Masmanidis; (penalty scored) Gygax	Stadium: Wersestadion; Attendance: 6,500; Referee: Markus Wingenbach (Diez)

10 August 2008	Rot-Weiß Erfurt	3–4	Bayern Munich	Erfurt
20:30 CEST	Cannizzaro 22'; Bunjaku 47', 67'	Report	Lahm 6'; Podolski 23'; Klose 57'; Kroos 80'	Stadium: Steigerwaldstadion; Attendance: 24,500; Referee: Florian Meyer (Burgdorf)

Source: kicker.de (in German)

=== Second round ===
The draw for the second round was conducted on 24 August 2008. The games were played on 23 and 24 September 2008.

23 September 2008	Erzgebirge Aue	1–2	Werder Bremen	Aue
19:00 CEST	F. Müller 7'	Report	Pizarro 26'; Rosenberg 54'	Stadium: Erzgebirgsstadion; Attendance: 15,000; Referee: Deniz Aytekin (Oberasbach)

23 September 2008	Energie Cottbus	3–0	Borussia Mönchengladbach	Cottbus
19:00 CEST	Rangelov 42' (pen.); Skela 73' (pen.), 89' (pen.)	Report		Stadium: Stadion der Freundschaft; Attendance: 9,805; Referee: Michael Kempter (Sauldorf)

23 September 2008	Mainz 05	3–1	1. FC Köln	Mainz
19:00 CEST	Bancé 61'; Karhan 68' (pen.); Peković 79'	Report	Mohamad 73'	Stadium: Stadion am Bruchweg; Attendance: 19,300; Referee: Herbert Fandel (Kyllburg)

23 September 2008	Eintracht Frankfurt	1–2 (a.e.t.)	Hansa Rostock	Frankfurt
19:00 CEST	Fenin 44' Caio (penalty missed)	Report	Kern 53', 101'	Stadium: Commerzbank Arena; Attendance: 18,300; Referee: Felix Brych (Munich)

23 September 2008	Schalke 04	2–0	Hannover 96	Gelsenkirchen
20:30 CEST	Westermann 56', 78'	Report		Stadium: Veltins-Arena; Attendance: 50,378; Referee: Jochen Drees (Münster-Sarmsheim)

23 September 2008	1860 Munich	0–0 (a.e.t.) (5–4 p)	MSV Duisburg	Munich
20:30 CEST	Penalty shootout: (penalty scored) Berhalter; (penalty scored) Gebhart; (penalty scored) Hoffmann; (penalty scored) Ledgerwood; (penalty scored) Bierofka	Report	Penalty shootout: (penalty scored) Tararache; (penalty scored) Schlicke; (penalty missed) Makiadi; (penalty scored) Brzenska; (penalty scored) Şahan	Stadium: Allianz Arena; Attendance: 5,500; Referee: Florian Meyer (Burgdorf)

23 September 2008	FC Augsburg	0–2	Bayer Leverkusen	Augsburg
20:30 CEST		Report	Kießling 36'; Vidal 79'	Stadium: Rosenaustadion; Attendance: 11,117; Referee: Lutz Wagner (Kriftel)

24 September 2008	Kickers Offenbach	0–2	Karlsruher SC	Offenbach
19:00 CEST		Report	Iashvili 45'; Porcello 58'	Stadium: Bieberer Berg; Attendance: 8,189; Referee: Marc Seemann (Essen)

24 September 2008	FC Oberneuland	0–7	VfL Wolfsburg	Bremen
19:00 CEST		Report	Džeko 15', 20', 57', 75'; Schäfer 26'; Dejagah 67'; Caiuby 89'	Stadium: Weserstadion Platz 11; Attendance: 2,196; Referee: Guido Winkmann (Kerken)

24 September 2008	Wehen Wiesbaden	1–0	Alemannia Aachen	Wiesbaden
19:00 CEST	König 72'	Report		Stadium: BRITA-Arena; Attendance: 4,016; Referee: Peter Gagelmann (Bremen)

24 September 2008	Borussia Dortmund	2–1 (a.e.t.)	Hertha BSC	Dortmund
19:00 CEST	Frei 7' (pen.); Klimowicz 107'	Report	Pantelić 22'	Stadium: Westfalenstadion; Attendance: 30,012; Referee: Michael Weiner (Giesen)

24 September 2008	Hamburger SV	2–0	VfL Bochum	Hamburg
19:00 CEST	Petrić 9', 90+2'	Report		Stadium: HSH Nordbank Arena; Attendance: 33,820; Referee: Peter Sippel (Munich)

24 September 2008	Carl Zeiss Jena	1–0	FSV Frankfurt	Jena
20:30 CEST	N. Petersen 25'	Report		Stadium: Ernst-Abbe-Sportfeld; Attendance: 5,852; Referee: Babak Rafati (Hannover)

24 September 2008	VfB Stuttgart	2–0	Arminia Bielefeld	Stuttgart
20:30 CEST	Cacau 17'; Marica 65'	Report		Stadium: Mercedes-Benz Arena; Attendance: 8,500; Referee: Günter Perl (Pullach)

24 September 2008	Bayern Munich	2–0	1. FC Nürnberg	Munich
20:30 CEST	Klose 7'; Borowski 69'	Report		Stadium: Allianz Arena; Attendance: 65,000; Referee: Manuel Gräfe (Berlin)

24 September 2008	SC Freiburg	3–1	1899 Hoffenheim	Freiburg
20:30 CEST	Schwaab 68' (pen.); Türker 84'; Idrissou 89' (pen.)	Report	Salihović 36' (pen.)	Stadium: Dreisamstadion; Attendance: 15,400; Referee: Knut Kircher (Rottenburg)

Source: kicker.de (in German)

=== Round of 16 ===
The draw for the round of 16 was conducted on 5 October 2008. The games were played on 27 and 28 January 2009.

27 January 2009	Hamburger SV	3–1	1860 Munich	Hamburg
19:00 CET	Olić 44', 78', 85'	Report	Bierofka 87'	Stadium: HSH Nordbank Arena; Attendance: 48,058; Referee: Michael Weiner (Giesen)

27 January 2009	Carl Zeiss Jena	1–4	Schalke 04	Jena
19:00 CET	Schembri 68' Riemer (red card) 81'	Report	Farfán 19' 66'; Rakitić 71'; Kurányi 90+2' Asamoah (red card) 75'	Stadium: Ernst-Abbe-Sportfeld; Attendance: 17,600; Referee: Deniz Aytekin (Oberasbach)

27 January 2009	SC Freiburg	1–3	Mainz 05	Freiburg
20:30 CET	Krmaš 71'	Report	Bungert 47'; Bancé 65'; Soto 81'	Stadium: Dreisamstadion; Attendance: 13,000; Referee: Peter Sippel (Munich)

27 January 2009	VfB Stuttgart	1–5	Bayern Munich	Stuttgart
20:30 CET	Gómez 85'	Report	Schweinsteiger 14', 55' (pen.); Ribéry 16'; Toni 43'; Zé Roberto 59' Ribéry (penalty missed) 21'	Stadium: Mercedes-Benz Arena; Attendance: 55,500; Referee: Herbert Fandel (Kyllburg)

28 January 2009	Bayer Leverkusen	3–1	Energie Cottbus	Düsseldorf
19:00 CET	Helmes 12'; Kadlec 29'; Augusto 43'	Report	Skela 90+1'	Stadium: LTU Arena; Attendance: 16,000; Referee: Wolfgang Stark (Ergolding)

28 January 2009	Borussia Dortmund	1–2	Werder Bremen	Dortmund
19:00 CET	Frei 11'	Report	Almeida 62'; Pizarro 80'	Stadium: Westfalenstadion; Attendance: 74,000; Referee: Manuel Gräfe (Berlin)

28 January 2009	Karlsruher SC	0–1	Wehen Wiesbaden	Karlsruhe
20:30 CET		Report	König 73'	Stadium: Wildparkstadion; Attendance: 13,686; Referee: Knut Kircher (Rottenburg)

28 January 2009	VfL Wolfsburg	5–1	Hansa Rostock	Wolfsburg
20:30 CET	Grafite 58', 86' (pen.), 90'; Bülow 66' (o.g.); Gentner 79'	Report	Fillinger 68'	Stadium: Volkswagen Arena; Attendance: 12,500; Referee: Jochen Drees (Münster-Sarmsheim)

Last updated: 28 January 2009
Source: kicker.de

=== Quarter-finals ===
The draw was conducted on 1 February 2009.

3 March 2009	Mainz 05	1–0	Schalke 04	Mainz
20:30 CET	Bancé 88'	Report		Stadium: Stadion am Bruchweg; Attendance: 20,100; Referee: Felix Brych (Munich)

4 March 2009	VfL Wolfsburg	2–5	Werder Bremen	Wolfsburg
19:00 CET	Džeko 10', 42'	Report	Diego 3', 55' (pen.); Özil 6'; Pizarro 71', 89'	Stadium: Volkswagen Arena; Attendance: 24,115; Referee: Thorsten Kinhöfer (Herne)

4 March 2009	Hamburger SV	2–1	Wehen Wiesbaden	Hamburg
19:00 CET	Kopilas 17' (o.g.); Petrić 37'	Report	Schwarz 85'	Stadium: HSH Nordbank Arena; Attendance: 35,378; Referee: Wolfgang Stark (Ergolding)

4 March 2009	Bayer Leverkusen	4–2	Bayern Munich	Düsseldorf
20:30 CET	Barnetta 54'; Vidal 61'; Helmes 70'; Kießling 90+2'	Report	Lúcio 72'; Klose 74'	Stadium: LTU Arena; Attendance: 50,500; Referee: Florian Mayer (Burgdorf)

=== Semi-finals ===
The draw was conducted on 7 March 2009.

21 April 2009
20:30 CEST

Bayer Leverkusen	4–1 (a.e.t.)	Mainz 05
Charisteas 82'; Vidal 92'; Friedrich 104'; Kadlec 117'	Report	Bancé 88'

LTU Arena, Düsseldorf
Attendance: 35,000
Referee: Michael Weiner (Giesen)

22 April 2009
20:30 CEST

Hamburger SV	1–1 (a.e.t.)	Werder Bremen
Olić 67'; Jarolím (red card) 90+2'	Report	Mertesacker 11'
Penalties
Mathijsen (penalty scored); Boateng (penalty missed); Olić (penalty missed); Jansen (penalty missed)	1–3	(penalty scored) Pizarro; (penalty scored) Özil; (penalty scored) Frings

HSH Nordbank Arena, Hamburg
Attendance: 55,237
Referee: Knut Kircher (Rottenburg)

=== Final ===
30 May 2009
20:00 CEST

Bayer Leverkusen	0–1	Werder Bremen
	Report	Özil 58'

Olympiastadion, Berlin
Attendance: 74,400
Referee: Helmut Fleischer (Sigmertshausen)
