= 2007–08 Borussia Dortmund season =

2007–08 season of Borussia Dortmund

Borussia Dortmund
2007–08 season
- Manager: Thomas Doll
- Stadium: Westfalenstadion
- Bundesliga: 13th
- DFB-Pokal: Runners-up
- Top goalscorer: Mladen Petrić (13)
Home colours	Away colours	Third colours

During the 2007–08 German football season, Borussia Dortmund competed in the Bundesliga.

== Season summary ==
Dortmund experienced their worst season in 20 years, finishing in 13th place, although they managed to reach the DFB-Pokal final. Manager Thomas Doll resigned at the end of the season. He was replaced by Mainz coach Jürgen Klopp.

== First-team squad ==
Squad at end of season

Note: Flags indicate national team as defined under FIFA eligibility rules; some limited exceptions apply. Players may hold more than one non-FIFA nationality.

No.	Pos.	Nation	Player
1	GK	GER	Roman Weidenfeller
2	DF	GER	Martin Amedick
3	DF	GER	Markus Brzenska
4	DF	GER	Christian Wörns (captain)
5	MF	GER	Sebastian Kehl
6	MF	GER	Florian Kringe
7	MF	BRA	Tinga
8	MF	GER	Giovanni Federico
9	FW	PAR	Nelson Valdez
10	FW	CRO	Mladen Petrić (Note: Petrić was born in Brčko, Yugoslavia (now Bosnia and Herzegovina), but also qualified to represent Croatia internationally and made his international debut for Croatia in November 2001.)
13	FW	SUI	Alexander Frei
14	DF	SRB	Antonio Rukavina
15	DF	GER	Mats Hummels (on loan from Bayern Munich)
16	MF	POL	Jakub Błaszczykowski
17	DF	BRA	Dedê
18	MF	GER	Lars Ricken
19	FW	ARG	Diego Klimowicz

No.	Pos.	Nation	Player
20	GK	GER	Marc Ziegler
21	DF	CRO	Robert Kovač (Note: Kovač was born in Berlin, Germany, but also qualified to represent Croatia internationally through his parents and made his international debut for Croatia in 1999.)
22	MF	GER	Marc-André Kruska
23	DF	SUI	Philipp Degen
24	DF	GER	Daniel Gordon (Note: Gordon was born in Dortmund, Germany, but also qualifies to represent Jamaica internationally and would make his international debut for Jamaica in June 2013.)
26	MF	RSA	Delron Buckley
27	DF	GER	Uwe Hünemeier
28	MF	GER	Sebastian Tyrała (Note: Tyrała was born in Racibórz, Poland, but also qualified to represent Germany internationally and represented them at U-19 level before making his international debut for Poland in December 2008.)
30	GK	GER	Marcel Höttecke
31	FW	GER	Christopher Nöthe
32	MF	CMR	Franck Patrick Njambe
33	DF	GER	David Vržogić
34	MF	GER	Christian Eggert
38	DF	GER	Nico Hillenbrand
39	FW	GER	Sahr Senesie (Note: Senesie was born in Koindu, Sierra Leone, but was raised in Germany from the age of 12 and represented them at U-20 and U-21 level.)
41	GK	GER	Alexander Bade

=== Left club during season ===
Note: Flags indicate national team as defined under FIFA eligibility rules; some limited exceptions apply. Players may hold more than one non-FIFA nationality.

No. / Pos. / Nation / Player; 14 / FW / POL / Ebi Smolarek (to Racing Santander)	No. / Pos. / Nation / Player; 25 / MF / TUR / Mehmet Akgün (Note: Akgün was born in Bielefeld, Germany, but also qualified to represent Turkey internationally and represented them at U-17 level.) (to Willem II)

== Competitions ==
=== Bundesliga ===
==== League table ====
Pos	Team	Pld	W	D	L	GF	GA	GD	Pts	Qualification or relegation
11	Karlsruher SC	34	11	10	13	38	53	−15	43	
12	VfL Bochum	34	10	11	13	48	54	−6	41	
13	Borussia Dortmund	34	10	10	14	50	62	−12	40	Qualification to UEFA Cup first round (Note: Because German Cup 2007–08 winners Bayern Munich had already qualified for the Champions League via their league placement, losing finalists Borussia Dortmund took the UEFA Cup spot reserved for the cup winners.)
14	Energie Cottbus	34	9	9	16	35	56	−21	36	
15	Arminia Bielefeld	34	8	10	16	35	60	−25	34	

Source: www.dfb.de
Rules for classification: 1) points; 2) goal difference; 3) number of goals scored.
