= Florian Mayer (disambiguation) =

Florian Meyer may refer to:

- Florian Mayer (born 1983), German tennis player.
- Florian Mayer (footballer) (born 1998), German footballer

== See also ==
- Florian Maier
- Florian Meyer (disambiguation)
