= Christian Eggert =

German footballer

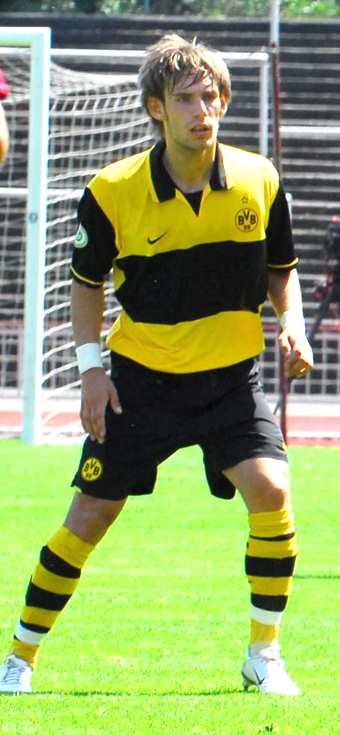
- Eggert with Borussia Dortmund

Personal information
- Date of birth: 16 January 1986 (age 40)
- Place of birth: Herne, West Germany
- Height: 1.80 m (5 ft 11 in)
- Position: Midfielder

Team information
- Current team: Westfalia Herne
- Number: 13

Youth career
- SC Pantringshof
- –2004: FC Schalke 04
- 2004–2005: Rot-Weiss Essen

Senior career*
Years	Team	Apps	(Gls)
2005–2008	Borussia Dortmund II	50	(2)
2007–2008	Borussia Dortmund	1	(0)
2008–2009	FSV Frankfurt	1	(0)
2009–2011	Borussia Dortmund II	43	(2)
2011–2014	1. FC Saarbrücken	85	(7)
2014–2015	SV Elversberg	18	(0)
2014–2015	SV Elversberg II	4	(1)
2015–2016	Saar 05 Saarbrücken	18	(2)
2016–2018	FV Diefflen	42	(10)
2018–2020	Schalke 04 II	45	(1)
2020–	Westfalia Herne	8	(0)

International career
	Germany U-20	14	(8)
- * Club domestic league appearances and goals as of 25 November 2020

Christian Eggert (born 16 January 1986) is a German former footballer.

== Career ==
Eggert was born in Herne, West Germany. He began his career with SC Pantringshof and was scouted later from FC Schalke 04. After few years with FC Schalke 04 he moved to rival Rot-Weiss Essen until 2005 when he joined Borussia Dortmund II. In summer 2006, Eggert transferred to FSV Frankfurt, but played here mainly for the reserve team. After his release from FSV Frankfurt he returned to Borussia Dortmund II and signed a one-year contract. In 2011, he signed for 1. FC Saarbrücken, where he spent three years, leaving at the end of the 2013–14 season after the club were relegated from the 3. Liga. He signed for SV Elversberg, another Saarland club that had been relegated from the 3. Liga, joining along with his FCS team-mate Kevin Maek.

== Career statistics ==
As of match played on 12 January 2021.

Appearances and goals by club, season and competition
Club	Season	League			Cup		Total	
Club	Season	Division	Apps	Goals	Apps	Goals	Apps	Goals
Borussia Dortmund II	2006–07	Regionalliga Nord	20	0	—		20	0
Borussia Dortmund II	2007–08	Regionalliga Nord	30	2	—		30	2
Borussia Dortmund II	Total		50	2	—		50	2
Borussia Dortmund	2007–08	Bundesliga	1	0	0	0	1	0
FSV Frankfurt	2008–09	2. Bundesliga	1	0	0	0	1	0
Borussia Dortmund II	2009–10	3. Liga	12	0	—		12	0
Borussia Dortmund II	2010–11	3. Liga	31	2	—		31	2
Borussia Dortmund II	Total		43	2	—		43	2
1. FC Saarbrücken	2011–12	3. Liga	36	4	1	0	37	4
1. FC Saarbrücken	2012–13	3. Liga	35	3	1	0	36	3
1. FC Saarbrücken	2013–14	3. Liga	14	0	2	0	16	0
1. FC Saarbrücken	Total		85	7	4	0	89	7
SV Elversberg	2014–15	Regionalliga Südwest	18	0	—		18	0
SV Elversberg II	2014–15	Oberliga Rheinland-Pfalz/Saar	4	1	—		4	1
Saar 05 Saarbrücken	2015–16	Regionalliga Südwest	18	2	—		18	2
FV Diefflen	2016–17	Oberliga Rheinland-Pfalz/Saar	9	0	—		9	0
FV Diefflen	2017–18	Oberliga Rheinland-Pfalz/Saar	33	10	—		33	10
FV Diefflen	Total		42	10	—		42	10
Schalke 04 II	2018–19	Oberliga Westfalen	23	1	—		23	1
Schalke 04 II	2019–20	Regionalliga West	22	0	—		22	0
Schalke 04 II	Total		45	1	—		45	1
Westfalia Herne	2020–21	Oberliga Westfalen	6	0	—		6	0
Career total			313	25	4	0	317	25

== Honours ==
- DFB-Pokal finalist: 2007–08
