= Serkan Göcer =

German footballer

Personal information
- Date of birth: 26 June 1993 (age 33)
- Place of birth: Dernbach, Germany
- Height: 1.72 m (5 ft 8 in)
- Position: Midfielder

Team information
- Current team: FV Engers 07

Youth career
- –2005: FC 1911 Horchheim
- 2005–2011: TuS Koblenz

Senior career*
Years	Team	Apps	(Gls)
2011–2012	Rot-Weiß Oberhausen	14	(1)
2012–2013	Saarbrücken II	7	(0)
2012–2014	Saarbrücken	28	(1)
2014	Elversberg	16	(1)
2014–2016	Schalke 04 II	58	(2)
2016–2019	Kickers Offenbach	58	(2)
2019–2022	FC 08 Homburg	41	(0)
2022–2024	Fortuna Köln	10	(0)
2024	FC Rot-Weiß Koblenz	0	(0)
2024–	FV Engers 07	0	(0)
- * Club domestic league appearances and goals as of 24 March 2024

Serkan Göcer (born 26 June 1993) is a German footballer who plays for FV Engers 07 in the Oberliga Rheinland-Pfalz/Saar.

== Career ==
After playing as a youth for his hometown club, TuS Koblenz, Göcer signed for Rot-Weiß Oberhausen in 2011 and made his 3. Liga debut in the second match of the 2011–12 season, replacing Timo Kunert in a 0–0 draw with 1. FC Saarbrücken. After Oberhausen were relegated at the end of the season, he signed for Saarbrücken. He was released by the club in January 2014 and signed for SV Elversberg. Less than a week after signing for Elversberg, he scored on his debut, a 3–1 win over the club he had just left.

== Career statistics ==
=== Club ===
Club performance			League		Cup		Continental		Other		Total	
Club	League	Season	App.	Goals	App.	Goals	App.	Goals	App.	Goals	App.	Goals
Germany			League		DFB-Pokal		Europe		Other		Total	
Rot-Weiß Oberhausen	3. Liga	2011–12	14	1	0	0	0	0	0	0	14	1
1. FC Saarbrücken II	Oberliga Rheinland-Pfalz/Saar	2012–13	7	0	0	0	0	0	0	0	7	0
1. FC Saarbrücken	3. Liga	2012–13	8	0	0	0	0	0	0	0	8	0
1. FC Saarbrücken	3. Liga	2013–14	20	1	2	0	0	0	0	0	22	1
SV Elversberg	3. Liga	2013–14	16	1	0	0	0	0	0	0	16	1
FC Schalke 04 II	Regionalliga West	2014–15	32	2	0	0	0	0	0	0	32	2
FC Schalke 04 II	Regionalliga West	2015–16	10	0	0	0	0	0	0	0	10	0
Total			107	5	2	0	0	0	0	0	109	5
Last updated: 25 October 2015
