= Florian Meyer =

Florian Meyer may refer to:

- Florian Meyer (referee) (born 1968), German referee
- Florian Meyer (footballer) (born 1987), German footballer

== See also ==
- Florian Mayer (born 1983), German tennis player
- Florian Maier (born 1992), Austrian footballer
