= Johannes Focher =

German footballer

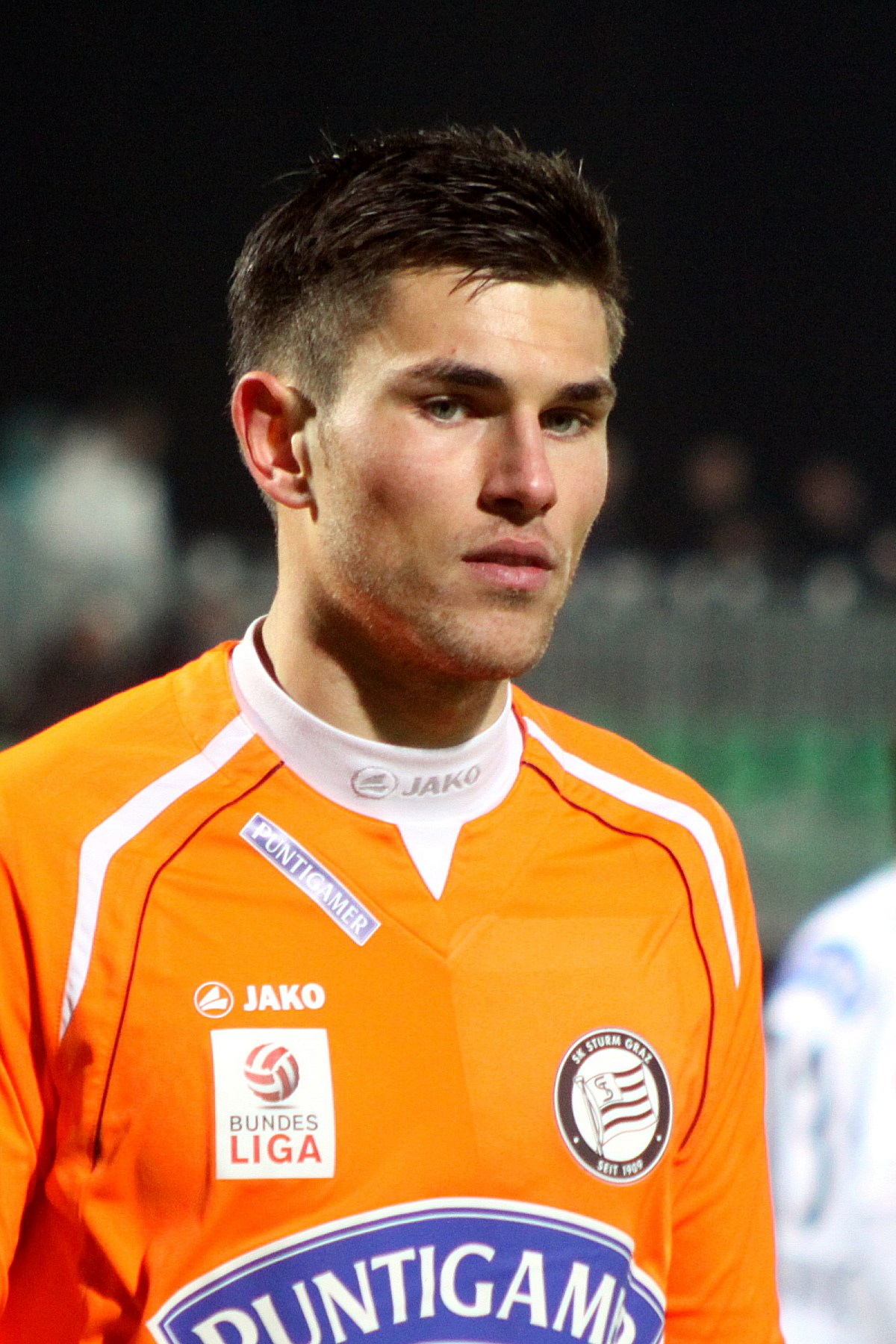
- Focher in 2013

Personal information
- Date of birth: 20 January 1990 (age 36)
- Place of birth: Hamm, West Germany
- Height: 1.97 m (6 ft 6 in)
- Position: Goalkeeper

Youth career
- 1991–2004: Hammer SpVg
- 2004–2009: Borussia Dortmund

Senior career*
Years	Team	Apps	(Gls)
2008–2012	Borussia Dortmund II	67	(0)
2010–2012	Borussia Dortmund	0	(0)
2012–2013	Sturm Graz	22	(0)
2012–2013	Sturm Graz II	4	(0)
2013–2014	Borussia Dortmund II	4	(0)
2016–2017	FC Kray	7	(0)
2017–2018	Schwarz-Weiß Essen	16	(0)
2018–2022	RSV Meinerzhagen	34	(0)
- * Club domestic league appearances and goals as of 14:09, 4 July 2024 (UTC)

Johannes Focher (born 20 January 1990) is a German former professional footballer who most recently played as a goalkeeper for Oberliga Westfalen club RSV Meinerzhagen.

== Club career ==
Focher began his career for Hammer SpVg. In summer 2006, he transferred to the junior section of Borussia Dortmund. In this club he became vice-champion of the German Junior Championships in 2007 with the B-Juniors and 2009 with the A-Juniors. In the 2008–09 season, Focher won the second place of the DFB-Junioren-Vereinspokal, even though he wasn't used in the final. In the same season, he also played for Borussia Dortmund II in the Regionalliga West where he was used two times in the first part, 13 times in the second half. With his club he got promoted into the 3. Liga. In the next step he became the second goalkeeper behind Marcel Höttecke, but after the regular goalkeeper had moved up to the bench due to an injury of Roman Weidenfeller, he debuted on 7 February 2010 in an away match of the 3. Liga against Kickers Offenbach.

After the end of 2011–12 season, he left the club at the end of the season on a Bosman transfer. After being released, Borussia Dortmund confirmed that Focher will join Austrian side Sturm Graz on free transfer which will keep him on a contract until June 2014. On his move, Focher told Sportinformationsdienst "I did not really need to think about moving on. Sturm Graz is a household club, even in Germany. I am looking to play for the club, getting to know its fans and the city of Graz as well." Manager Focher expected to face competition with Christian Gratzei to become a first choice goalkeeper. Coach Peter Hyballa said about Focher: "Christian Gratzei is the top dog in the gate, and Johannes is his challenger. They will push each other to excel, it will benefit the entire team."

On 2 September 2013, he returned to Borussia Dortmund II on a one-year contract.

== Career statistics ==
As of matches played on 25 June 2018

Appearances and goals by club, season and competition
Club	Season	League			Cup		Total	
Club	Season	Division	Apps	Goals	Apps	Goals	Apps	Goals
Borussia Dortmund II	2008–09	Regionalliga West	15	0	—		15	0
Borussia Dortmund II	2009–10	3. Liga	5	0	—		5	0
Borussia Dortmund II	2010–11	Regionalliga West	29	0	—		29	0
Borussia Dortmund II	2011–12	Regionalliga West	18	0	—		18	0
Borussia Dortmund II	Total		67	0	—		67	0
Sturm Graz	2012–13	Austrian Bundesliga	22	0	2	0	24	0
Sturm Graz II	2012–13		4	0	—		4	0
Borussia Dortmund II	2013–14	3. Liga	4	0	—		4	0
FC Kray	2016–17	Oberliga Niederrhein	7	0	—		7	0
Schwarz-Weiß Essen	2017–18	Oberliga Niederrhein	16	0	—		16	0
Career total			120	0	2	0	122	0
