= Tim Kruse =

German footballer

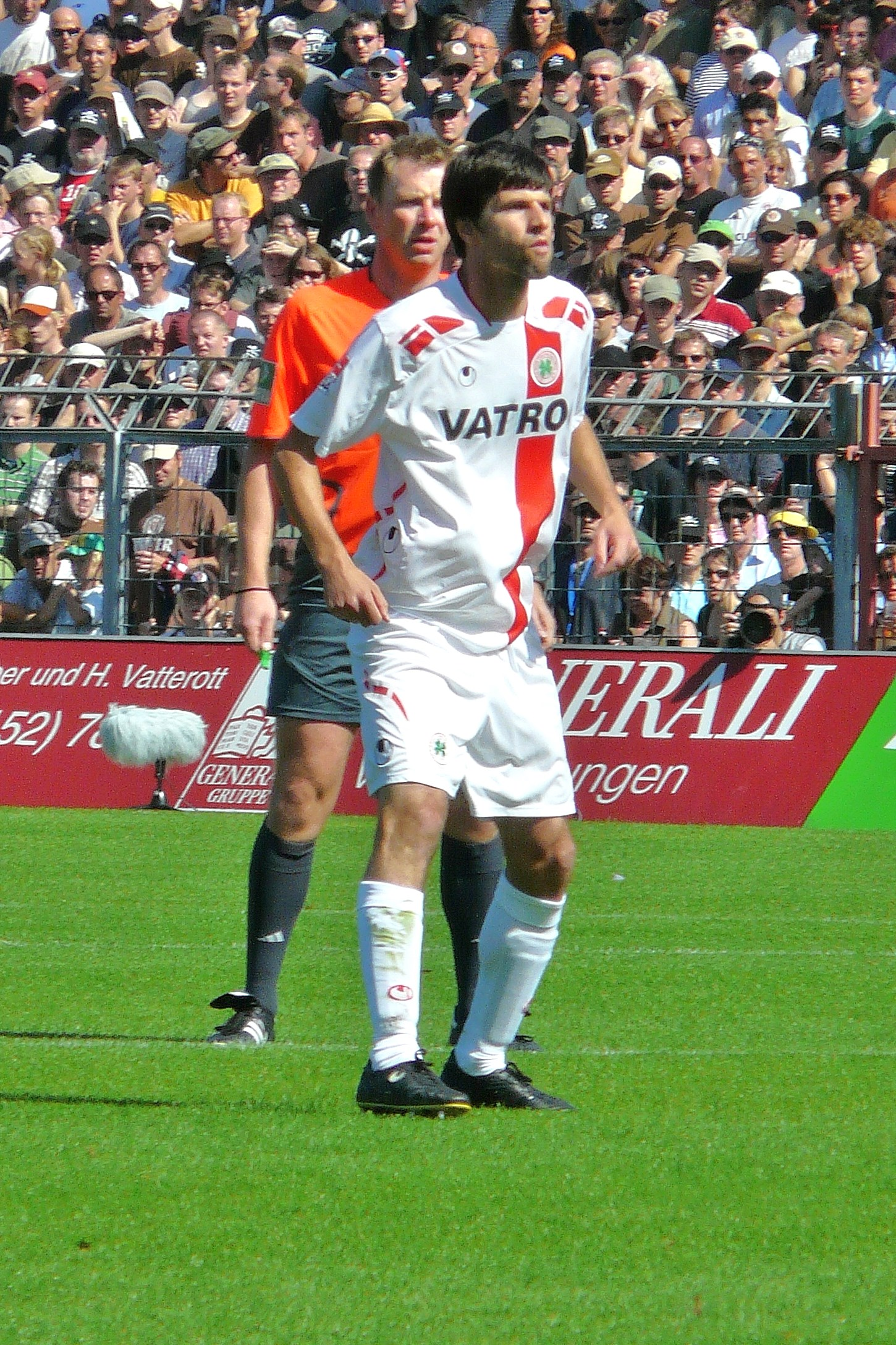
- Tim Kruse as a player for Rot-Weiß Oberhausen

Personal information
- Date of birth: 10 January 1983 (age 43)
- Place of birth: Mayen, Rhineland-Palatinate, West Germany
- Height: 1.86 m (6 ft 1 in)
- Position: Defensive midfielder

Team information
- Current team: Energie Cottbus (assistant)

Youth career
- Union Rösrath
- –2000: TV Hoffnungsthal
- 2000–2001: Bayer Leverkusen

Senior career*
Years	Team	Apps	(Gls)
2001–2004	Bayer Leverkusen II	56	(?)
2004–2007	Fortuna Düsseldorf	75	(7)
2007–2011	Rot-Weiß Oberhausen	89	(5)
2011–2014	FC Saarbrücken	69	(3)
2014–2016	Hallescher FC	71	(5)
2016–2019	Energie Cottbus	64	(1)

International career
	Germany U-20	7	(0)

Managerial career
- 2020–: Energie Cottbus (assistant)
- 2020: Energie Cottbus (caretaker)
- * Club domestic league appearances and goals

Tim Kruse (born 10 January 1983) is a German football coach and a former player who played as a defensive midfielder. He is the assistant manager of FC Energie Cottbus.

== Career ==
Kruse made his debut on the professional league level in the 2. Bundesliga for Rot-Weiß Oberhausen on 17 August 2008 when he started in a game against TuS Koblenz.

Kruse retired at the end of the 2018–19 season. In January 2020, he was hired as assistant coach of Sebastian Abt at his former club, FC Energie Cottbus.

== Career statistics ==
As of matches played on 28 May 2018.

Club	Season	League			Cup		Total		Ref.
Club	Season	Division	Apps	Goals	Apps	Goals	Apps	Goals	Ref.
Bayer Leverkusen II	2001–02	Regionalliga Nord	5	0	—		5	0	
Bayer Leverkusen II	2002–03	Regionalliga Nord	17	1	—		17	1	
Bayer Leverkusen II	2003–04	Oberliga Nordrhein	34	??	1	0	35	??	
Bayer Leverkusen II	Totals		56	1	1	0	57	1	—
Fortuna Düsseldorf	2004–05	Regionalliga Nord	25	4	1	0	26	4	
Fortuna Düsseldorf	2005–06	Regionalliga Nord	32	2	—		32	2	
Fortuna Düsseldorf	2006–07	Regionalliga Nord	18	1	—		18	1	
Fortuna Düsseldorf	Totals		75	7	1	0	76	7	—
Rot-Weiß Oberhausen	2007–08	Regionalliga Nord	34	1	—		34	1	
Rot-Weiß Oberhausen	2008–09	2. Bundesliga	32	3	1	0	33	3	
Rot-Weiß Oberhausen	2009–10	2. Bundesliga	7	0	1	0	8	0	
Rot-Weiß Oberhausen	2010–11	2. Bundesliga	16	1	0	0	16	1	
Rot-Weiß Oberhausen	Totals		89	5	2	0	91	5	—
1. FC Saarbrücken	2011–12	3. Liga	33	1	1	0	34	1	
1. FC Saarbrücken	2012–13	3. Liga	22	2	1	0	23	2	
1. FC Saarbrücken	2013–14	3. Liga	14	0	3	0	17	0	
1. FC Saarbrücken	Totals		69	3	5	0	74	3	—
Hallescher FC	2013–14	3. Liga	15	0	—		15	0	
Hallescher FC	2014–15	3. Liga	33	4	—		33	4	
Hallescher FC	2015–16	3. Liga	23	1	1	0	24	1	
Hallescher FC	Totals		71	5	1	0	72	5	—
Energie Cottbus	2016–17	Regionalliga Nordost	23	0	—		23	0	
Energie Cottbus	2017–18	Regionalliga Nordost	24	1	1	0	25	1	
Energie Cottbus	Totals		47	1	1	0	48	1	—
Career totals			407	22	11	0	418	22	—
