= Jörn Neumeister =

German footballer (born 1987)

Personal information
- Date of birth: 7 May 1987 (age 39)
- Place of birth: Münster, West Germany
- Height: 1.88 m (6 ft 2 in)
- Position: Centre-back

Youth career
- –1998: VfL Schwerte
- 1998–2005: Borussia Dortmund

Senior career*
Years	Team	Apps	(Gls)
2005–2011	Borussia Dortmund II	58	(4)
- * Club domestic league appearances and goals

Jörn Neumeister (born 7 May 1987) is a German former footballer who played as a centre-back for Borussia Dortmund II.

== Career ==
Neumeister made his professional debut in the 3. Liga for Borussia Dortmund II on 21 August 2009, coming on as a substitute in the 64th minute for David Vržogić in the 1–0 away win against FC Ingolstadt.
