= Fabian Götze =

German footballer

Personal information
- Full name: Fabian Götze
- Date of birth: 3 June 1990 (age 36)
- Place of birth: Ronsberg, West Germany
- Height: 1.77 m (5 ft 10 in)
- Position: Left-back

Youth career
- 1995–1998: SC Ronsberg
- 1998–2001: FC Eintracht Hombruch
- 2001–2009: Borussia Dortmund

Senior career*
Years	Team	Apps	(Gls)
2009–2010	Borussia Dortmund II	8	(0)
2010–2011	1. FSV Mainz 05 II	38	(1)
2011–2013	VfL Bochum II	59	(6)
2013–2015	SpVgg Unterhaching	47	(2)

International career
2006–2007	Germany U17	6	(1)
- * Club domestic league appearances and goals as of 23 June 2015

Fabian Götze (born 3 June 1990) is a German former professional footballer who played as a left-back.

== Career ==
Götze began his career with SC Ronsberg and later signed for FC Eintracht Hombruch. In summer 2001, he was scouted by Borussia Dortmund. He made his debut for Borussia Dortmund II squad on 25 July 2007 in the 3. Liga. He left Borussia Dortmund on 5 January 2010 and signed a contract with FSV Mainz 05 which expired on 30 June 2013.

== Statistics ==
As of matches played on 2 September 2018.

Club	Season	League		
Club	Season	Division	Apps	Goals
Borussia Dortmund II	2009–10	3. Liga	8	0
1. FSV Mainz 05 II	2009–10	Regionalliga West	9	0
1. FSV Mainz 05 II	2010–11	Regionalliga West	29	1
1. FSV Mainz 05 II	Totals		38	1
VfL Bochum II	2011–12	Regionalliga West	26	1
VfL Bochum II	2012–13	Regionalliga West	33	5
VfL Bochum II	Totals		59	6
SpVgg Unterhaching	2013–14	3. Liga	27	1
SpVgg Unterhaching	2014–15	3. Liga	20	1
SpVgg Unterhaching	Totals		47	2
Career totals			143	9

== Personal life ==
Fabian is the brother of Mario Götze who is a playmaker at Eintracht Frankfurt, born exactly two years apart, and Felix, is also a footballer for SC Paderborn 07.
