= Eric Agyemang =

German footballer (born 1980)

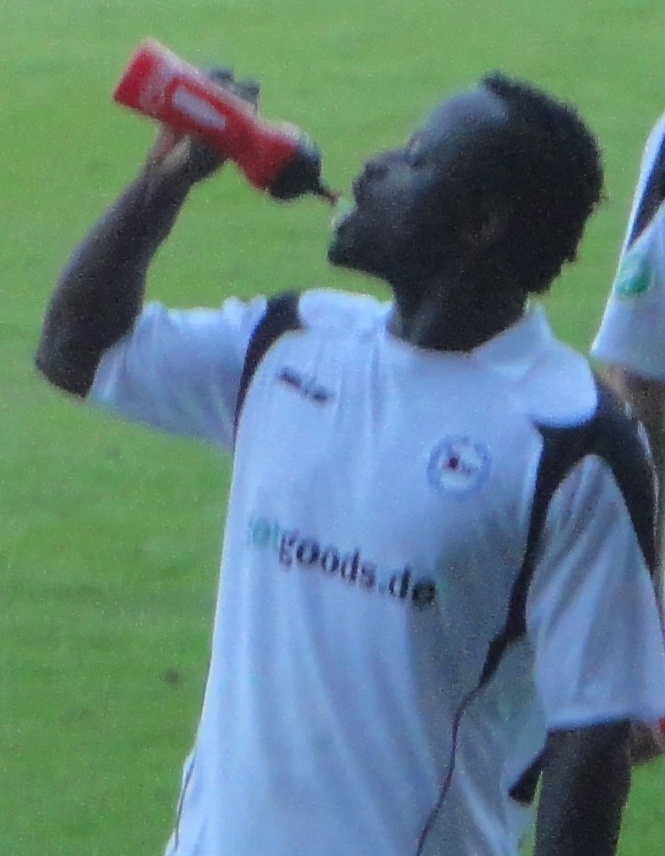
- Agyemang in 2011

Personal information
- Full name: Eric Kofi Poku Agyemang
- Date of birth: 11 January 1980 (age 46)
- Place of birth: Obuasi, Ghana
- Height: 1.80 m (5 ft 11 in)
- Position: Striker

Youth career
- 1997–1999: Goldfields Obuasi

Senior career*
Years	Team	Apps	(Gls)
1999–2000	FC St. Pauli II	9	(0)
2000–2002	Eichholzer SV	47	(19)
2002–2004	SC Vorwärts Billstedt	31	(10)
2004–2005	Kickers Emden	32	(18)
2005–2007	SC Pfullendorf	37	(12)
2007–2008	1. FC Magdeburg	18	(0)
2008–2010	Erzgebirge Aue	48	(17)
2010–2011	Wacker Burghausen	29	(13)
2011–2013	Arminia Bielefeld	4	(0)
2013–2016	TuS Dassendorf	60	(44)
2016–2018	Wedeler TSV	54	(29)
2018–2019	Düneberger SV	1	(2)
Total		370	(164)
- * Club domestic league appearances and goals

Eric Agyemang (born 11 January 1980) is a German former professional footballer who played as a forward.

== Career ==
Agyemang was born in Obuasi, Ghana. On 10 April 2010, he scored his first hat-trick in Germany for Erzgebirge Aue against VfL Osnabrück.
