= Christian Cappek =

German footballer

Personal information
- Date of birth: 25 July 1990 (age 36)
- Place of birth: Augsburg, West Germany
- Height: 1.86 m (6 ft 1 in)
- Position: Forward

Youth career
- 1994–2001: SV Mering
- 2001–2003: FC Augsburg
- 2003–2008: TSV 1860 Munich

Senior career*
Years	Team	Apps	(Gls)
2008–2011	Wacker Burghausen	75	(17)
2011–2012	Erzgebirge Aue	5	(0)
2013	FC Augsburg II	8	(1)
2013–2015	Kickers Offenbach	60	(21)
2015	Chemnitzer FC	11	(0)
2016–2017	Wehen Wiesbaden	3	(0)
- * Club domestic league appearances and goals as of 11:29, 22 July 2018 (UTC)

Christian Cappek (born 25 July 1990) is a German footballer who plays as a forward.

== Career ==
Cappek played as youth for FC Augsburg and TSV 1860 Munich before joining SV Wacker Burghausen in 2008, where he made his senior debut in a 3–1 3. Liga win over Kickers Emden. He came on as a substitute for David Solga and scored Burghausen's third goal in the 88th minute. After three years with Wacker, he signed for 2. Bundesliga side FC Erzgebirge Aue in July 2011. He was released on a free transfer in November 2012 after six appearances for the club, the last of which had come almost a year earlier. Two months later he signed for FC Augsburg II, where he spent half a season before joining Kickers Offenbach.

In the summer 2015, Cappek joined Chemnitzer FC.
