= Andreas Richter =

German former footballer

Personal information
- Date of birth: 15 September 1977 (age 49)
- Place of birth: Cottbus, East Germany
- Height: 1.90 m (6 ft 3 in)
- Position: Defender

Team information
- Current team: Energie Cottbus U19 (assistant)

Youth career
- FSV Cottbus

Senior career*
Years	Team	Apps	(Gls)
1998–1999	FC Energie Cottbus		
1999–2001	FSV Hoyerswerda		
2001–2003	VFC Plauen	63	(26)
2003–2005	FC Rot-Weiß Erfurt	54	(4)
2005–2009	TuS Koblenz	91	(5)
2009–2011	Chemnitzer FC	70	(22)

Managerial career
- 2012–2013: Chemnitzer FC (assistant)
- 2013–2015: VfB Auerbach
- 2015–: Energie Cottbus U19 (assistant)
- * Club domestic league appearances and goals

Andreas Richter (born 15 September 1977 in Cottbus, East Germany) is a German former footballer and currently the assistant manager of Energie Cottbus U19.

== Career ==
He made his debut on the professional league level in the 2. Bundesliga for FC Rot-Weiß Erfurt on 8 August 2004 when he started a game against 1. FC Saarbrücken.
