= Lukas Nottbeck =

German footballer

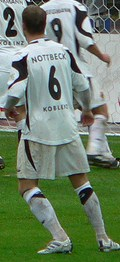

Personal information
- Date of birth: October 22, 1988 (age 38)
- Place of birth: Datteln, West Germany
- Position: Defensive midfielder

Team information
- Current team: 1. FC Köln II

Youth career
- Germania Datteln
- –2004: GW Selm
- 2004–2005: FC Schalke 04
- 2005–2006: Rot Weiss Ahlen
- 2006–2007: 1. FC Köln

Senior career*
Years	Team	Apps	(Gls)
2007–2010	1. FC Köln II	53	(11)
2010	Borussia Dortmund II	15	(2)
2010–2011	TuS Koblenz	23	(2)
2011–2013	SC Fortuna Köln	66	(9)
2013–2018	Viktoria Köln	197	(25)
2018–	1. FC Köln II	20	(3)
- * Club domestic league appearances and goals as of 2 April 2019 (UTC)

Lukas Nottbeck (born October 22, 1988) is a German footballer who plays for 1. FC Köln II.
