= Skerdilaid Curri =

Albanian footballer

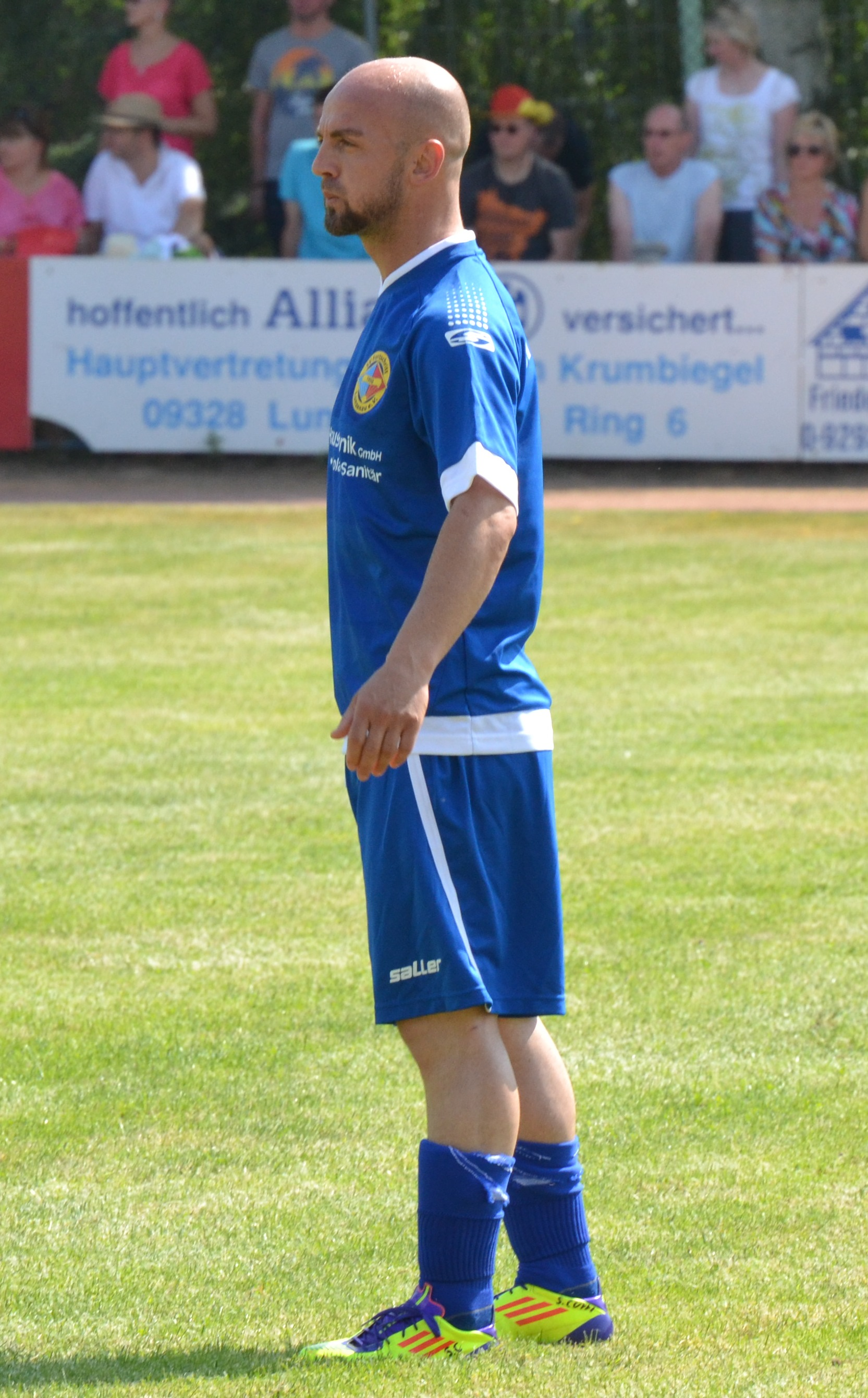
- Curri during a friendly match in 2014

Personal information
- Date of birth: 6 October 1975 (age 51)
- Place of birth: Kavajë, Albania
- Height: 1.66 m (5 ft 5 in)
- Positions: Midfielder; forward

Youth career
- –1993: Besa

Senior career*
Years	Team	Apps	(Gls)
1993–1995	Besa	42	(4)
1995–1997	Partizani	45	(9)
1998	SpVgg Unterhaching	1	(0)
1998–1999	FT Starnberg 09	22	(5)
1999–2003	VFC Plauen	91	(22)
2003–2012	Erzgebirge Aue	244	(28)
2012–2013	Erzgebirge Aue II	11	(0)
2014	Erzgebirge Aue	0	(0)
2015–2016	Thum-Herold		
2018	SV Poppenreuth	4	(0)
2018	Auswahl Sachsen	0	(0)
2019–	SV Poppenreuth	4	(0)
Total		464	(68)

Managerial career
- 2012–2013: Erzgebirge Aue II (player-manager)
- 2013–2014: Erzgebirge Aue II
- 2014–2015: Erzgebirge Aue II
- 2015–2016: Thum-Herold (player-manager)
- * Club domestic league appearances and goals

Skerdilaid Curri (born 6 October 1975) is an Albanian former professional footballer who played as a midfielder or forward, spending most of his career with German club Erzgebirge Aue. He also holds German citizenship.

== Career statistics ==
Appearances and goals by club, season and competition
Club	Season	League			Cup		Total	
Club	Season	Division	Apps	Goals	Apps	Goals	Apps	Goals
Besa Kavajë	1993–94	Albanian Superliga	15	0			15	0
Besa Kavajë	1994–95	Albanian Superliga	27	4			27	4
Besa Kavajë	Total		42	4			42	4
Partizani Tirana	1995–96	Albanian Superliga	27	6			27	6
Partizani Tirana	1996–97	Albanian Superliga	8	2			8	2
Partizani Tirana	1997–98	Albanian Superliga	10	1			10	1
Partizani Tirana	Total		45	9			45	9
SpVgg Unterhaching	1997–98	2. Bundesliga	1	0			1	0
FT Starnberg 09	1998–99	Oberliga Bayern	22	5	–		22	5
VFC Plauen	1999–2000	Regionalliga Nordost	3	0	2	0	5	0
VFC Plauen	2000–01	NOFV-Oberliga Süd	26	4	–		26	4
VFC Plauen	2001–02	NOFV-Oberliga Süd	31	9	–		31	9
VFC Plauen	2002–03	NOFV-Oberliga Süd	31	9	–		31	9
VFC Plauen	Total		91	22	2	0	93	22
Erzgebirge Aue	2003–04	2. Bundesliga	34	5	1	0	35	5
Erzgebirge Aue	2004–05	2. Bundesliga	28	6	1	0	29	6
Erzgebirge Aue	2005–06	2. Bundesliga	22	2	1	0	23	2
Erzgebirge Aue	2006–07	2. Bundesliga	25	2	1	0	26	2
Erzgebirge Aue	2007–08	2. Bundesliga	30	3	0	0	30	3
Erzgebirge Aue	2008–09	3. Liga	30	5	2	0	32	5
Erzgebirge Aue	2009–10	3. Liga	33	3	3	2	36	5
Erzgebirge Aue	2010–11	2. Bundesliga	30	1	1	0	31	1
Erzgebirge Aue	2011–12	2. Bundesliga	12	1	1	0	13	1
Erzgebirge Aue	Total		244	28	11	2	254	30
Erzgebirge Aue II	2012–13	NOFV-Oberliga Süd	11	0	–		11	0
Career total			456	68	13	2	469	70

== Honours ==
Partizani Tirana

- Albanian Cup: 1996–97
