= Mehmet Boztepe =

Turkish professional footballer

Memo Boztepe
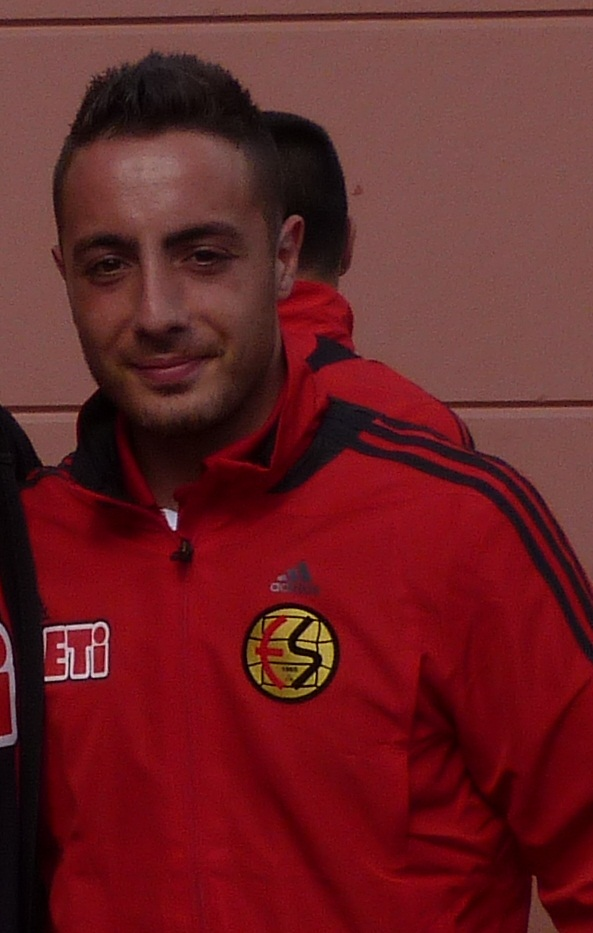
- Mehmet Boztepe in 2011

Personal information
- Date of birth: 16 January 1988 (age 38)
- Place of birth: Elazığ, Turkey
- Height: 1.82 m (5 ft 11 1/2 in)
- Position: Winger

Team information
- Current team: MSV Düsseldorf
- Number: 7

Youth career
- –2007: Borussia Mönchengladbach

Senior career*
Years	Team	Apps	(Gls)
2007–2011	Borussia Dortmund II	38	(3)
2011	Eskisehirspor	0	(0)
2012	Elazığspor	0	(0)
2012	FC Emmen	14	(0)
2012–2013	Wuppertaler SV	28	(2)
2013–2014	SSVg Velbert	13	(1)
2014–2015	Adanaspor	39	(3)
2015–2016	Bandırmaspor	34	(8)
2016–2019	Balıkesirspor	73	(8)
2019–2020	Menemenspor	29	(6)
2020–2021	Sakaryaspor	30	(2)
2021–2022	Uşak Spor	28	(4)
2022–	MSV Düsseldorf	10	(1)

International career
2008	Turkey U20	1	(0)
- * Club domestic league appearances and goals as of 30 October 2022

Mehmet Boztepe (born 16 January 1988) is a Turkish professional footballer who plays for German Oberliga Niederrhein club MSV Düsseldorf.

== Birth and Childhood ==
Boztepe was born in 1988 in Elazig. In the same year his father moved to Germany and settled down in Moers. A year later moved Boztepe with his mother and his sister.

== Career ==
He has risen through the ranks from the youth team of Borussia Mönchengladbach. From 2007 Boztepe then played in the second team of the Bundesliga side Borussia Dortmund. With this he rose above 2008 in the newly formed 3. Liga. 2011 he moved to his native country and signed with the first division Eskisehirspor. After half a year without an assignment, he moved to the second division Elazigspor from his hometown of Elazig. Because of eligibility, which was missing, he joined the Dutch second division FC Emmen. Half a season later, he returned to Germany to sign for Wuppertaler SV. On 17 June 2013, it was announced that Boztepe will move on 1 July 2013 to SSVg Velbert.

On 8 January 2014, Boztepe joined the Turkish 1st division club Adanaspor.

== International career ==
Böztepe plays as an attacking midfielder or a winger. On 15 February 2010 he was nominated for the Turkey national under-21 football team. He was appointed for the Turkmenistan AFC President's Cup.
