= Gabriel Fernández (footballer, born 1977) =

Argentine footballer

Personal information
- Full name: Gabriel Héctor Fernández
- Date of birth: 22 September 1977 (age 49)
- Place of birth: Bragado, Argentina
- Height: 1.75 m (5 ft 9 in)
- Position: Midfielder

Senior career*
Years	Team	Apps	(Gls)
1997–1998	Bastia		
1998	Santiago Morning		
1999–2000	Colegiales		
2001	Magallanes		
2001–2002	Flandria		
2003	Deportivo Saquisilí		
2003–2004	Estudiantes (B.A.)		
2004	Olmedo		
2005–2006	Millonarios		
2006	Real Cartagena		
2007	Junior		
2007	Emelec		
2008	TuS Koblenz	22	(1)
2009–2010	Macará	27	(19)
2010	América de Cali	18	(6)
2011–2012	Deportivo Cali	35	(3)
2012	Flandria	8	(3)
- * Club domestic league appearances and goals

Gabriel Héctor Fernández (born 22 September 1977 in Bragado) is an Argentine former professional footballer.
