= Aleksandar Kotuljac =

German footballer

Personal information
- Date of birth: 2 November 1981 (age 44)
- Place of birth: Hanover, West Germany
- Height: 1.80 m (5 ft 11 in)
- Position: Striker

Youth career
- TuS Davenstadt
- LSV Alexandria Hannover
- –1997: SV Linden 07
- 1997–2000: Hannover 96

Senior career*
Years	Team	Apps	(Gls)
2000–2004	Hannover 96 II	91	(43)
2004–2005	Eintracht Nordhorn	21	(5)
2005–2007	1. FC Magdeburg	38	(20)
2007–2009	Greuther Fürth	48	(9)
2009–2012	VfL Osnabrück	48	(12)
2012–2014	Sportfreunde Lotte	69	(21)
2014–2016	SC Wiedenbrück	32	(5)
2016–2018	BV Cloppenburg	38	(7)
2018–2019	Osnabrücker SC	17	(11)
Total		402	(133)

Managerial career
- 2018–2019: Osnabrücker SC
- * Club domestic league appearances and goals

Aleksandar Kotuljac (born 2 November 1981) is a German retired professional footballer who played as a striker.

== Career ==
Born in Hanover, Kotuljac spent his youth with various clubs in his hometown of Hanover before moving to Hannover 96 in 1997. In 2000, he joined Hannover 96's reserve team and went on to score more than 40 goals in the next four seasons. As Hannover's reserves are a U23 team, Kotuljac left the club in 2004, joining Oberliga Nord side Eintracht Nordhorn. At the end of the 2004–05 season he left for the then NOFV-Oberliga Süd side 1. FC Magdeburg.

Here Kotuljac scored 11 goals in 21 matches in his first season, and he won promotion to Regionalliga Nord with his new club. However, in a match against ZFC Meuselwitz Kotuljac was injured severely and was ruled out for the rest of the year. Only in February 2007 could he come back to play, and he scored nine goals in 17 matches in the Regionalliga Nord, at the end of the season 1. FC Magdeburg narrowly missed out on promotion to the 2. Bundesliga, and Kotuljac was allowed to leave on a free transfer for SpVgg Greuther Fürth. In the 2007–08 season he established himself in the first team, scoring six goals in 29 matches. On 23 June 2009, he signed for VfL Osnabrück.
