= Michael Oscislawski =

Polish-German footballer

Personal information
- Full name: Michael Oscislawski
- Date of birth: 16 January 1987 (age 39)
- Place of birth: Bytom, Poland
- Height: 1.80 m (5 ft 11 in)
- Position: Midfielder

Team information
- Current team: VfL Kemminghausen

Youth career
- TuS Kruckel
- –1998: Red-White Barop
- 1998–2006: Borussia Dortmund

Senior career*
Years	Team	Apps	(Gls)
2004–2010	Borussia Dortmund II	56	(1)
2010–2011	Sportfreunde Lotte	25	(0)
2012	ASC 09 Dortmund	12	(1)
2012–2013	VfB Hüls	34	(1)
2013–2014	Hammer SpVg	32	(0)
2014–2015	SV Holzwickede	29	(0)
2015–2017	SC Roland	55	(2)
2017–2019	BSV Schüren	48	(4)
2019–2020	I.G. Bönen	1	(0)
2020–	VfL Kemminghausen	4	(2)

International career
2003	Germany U-17		
- * Club domestic league appearances and goals as of 19 February 2021

Michael Oscislawski (Polish: Michał Ościsławski; born 16 January 1987 in Bytom) is a Polish-German footballer who plays for VfL Kemminghausen.

== Career ==
Oscislawski played in the youth first for TuS Kruckel and red and white Barop before he moved to Borussia Dortmund. Here he played until the end of the 2005/06 season, mainly in the junior teams, but was already in the 2004/05 season as a substitute for first jobs to the seniors, whom he played for the reserve of Borussia in the Regionalliga Nord. In the summer of 2006 he was finally firmly integrated into the squad of the second men's team, however, remained in the following years additional players. In this role, he rose in the 2008/09 season with his team in the 3rd League on. There he was on 28 August 2009 his professional league debut in the 1:2 home defeat against SpVgg Unterhaching. He replaced while in the 72nd Minutes Julian Koch. On 22 May 2010 signed a two-year contract with Sportfreunde Lotte and joined official to his new club on 1 July 2010.
