= Johannes Meier (footballer) =

German footballer

Personal information
- Full name: Johannes Meier
- Date of birth: 24 September 1984 (age 42)
- Place of birth: Kaufbeuren, West Germany
- Height: 1.83 m (6 ft 0 in)
- Position: Defender

Youth career
- FC Memmingen
- –2003: 1860 Munich

Senior career*
Years	Team	Apps	(Gls)
2003–2006	SSV Ulm	88	(5)
2006–2011	1. FC Heidenheim	158	(7)
- * Club domestic league appearances and goals

Johannes Meier (born 24 September 1984) is a German former footballer who played as a defender.

== Career ==
Meier made his professional debut in the 3. Liga for 1. FC Heidenheim on 25 July 2009, starting in the home match against Wuppertaler SV which finished as a 2–2 draw.
