= Franck Patrick Njambe =

Cameroonian footballer

Patrick Njambe
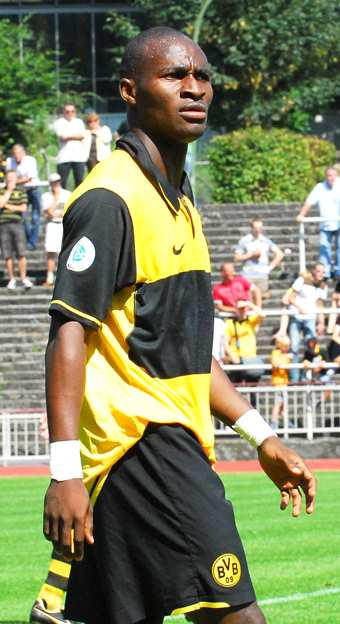

Personal information
- Full name: Franck Patrick Njambe
- Date of birth: 24 October 1987 (age 39)
- Place of birth: Douala, Cameroon
- Height: 1.77 m (5 ft 10 in)
- Position: Midfielder

Youth career
- 1999–2004: Union Douala
- 2004–2005: Borussia Dortmund

Senior career*
Years	Team	Apps	(Gls)
2005–2010	Borussia Dortmund II	48	(8)
2007–2008	Borussia Dortmund	2	(0)
2010–2012	KFC Uerdingen 05		
2013	SV Westfalia Rhynern		
2013–2014	SC Wiedenbrück 2000		

International career
2008–	Cameroon	1	(0)
- * Club domestic league appearances and goals

Frank Patrick Njambe (born 24 October 1987) is a Cameroonian former footballer who played as a midfielder. He played in the Bundesliga for Borussia Dortmund.

== Career ==
Njambe began his career with Union Douala and in the summer of 2004 joined one of Germany's top clubs, Borussia Dortmund. It would be several years before he played his first professional game, which came on 29 September 2007 against Karlsruher SC. Njambe was called to join Cameroonian Olympics team to prepare for Olympic Games 2008 in China. But unfortunately he got injured and could not attend that event. He needed several months to recover and at the end could not renew his contract with Borussia Dortmund. To keep fit, he signed a two years contract with KFC Uerdingen 05, which ended on 30 June 2012.

== Coaching career ==
Njambe went to Cameroon and founded a football school to develop young talent in Douala.

== Honours ==
- 2007: U-23 Africa Champion
