= Nedim Hasanbegović =

German footballer

Personal information
- Date of birth: 22 April 1988 (age 38)
- Place of birth: Sarajevo, SFR Yugoslavia
- Height: 1.84 m (6 ft 0 in)
- Position: Midfielder

Team information
- Current team: SpVg. Eidertal Molfsee
- Number: 8

Youth career
- –2004: Holstein Kiel
- 2004–2006: Schalke 04

Senior career*
Years	Team	Apps	(Gls)
2006–2009	Schalke 04 III	43	(1)
2009–2011	Borussia Dortmund II	44	(3)
2011–2012	Rot-Weiß Oberhausen	13	(0)
2012–2013	VfB Lübeck	28	(2)
2013–2020	Weiche Flensburg	130	(11)
2021–	SpVg. Eidertal Molfsee	34	(5)

Managerial career
- 2022–: SpVg. Eidertal Molfsee (player-assistant)
- * Club domestic league appearances and goals as of 18 May 2024

Nedim Hasanbegović (born 22 April 1988) is a German footballer who plays as a midfielder for Oberliga Schleswig-Holstein club SpVg. Eidertal Molfsee, he is also an assistant coach for the team.
