= Timo Nagy =

German footballer

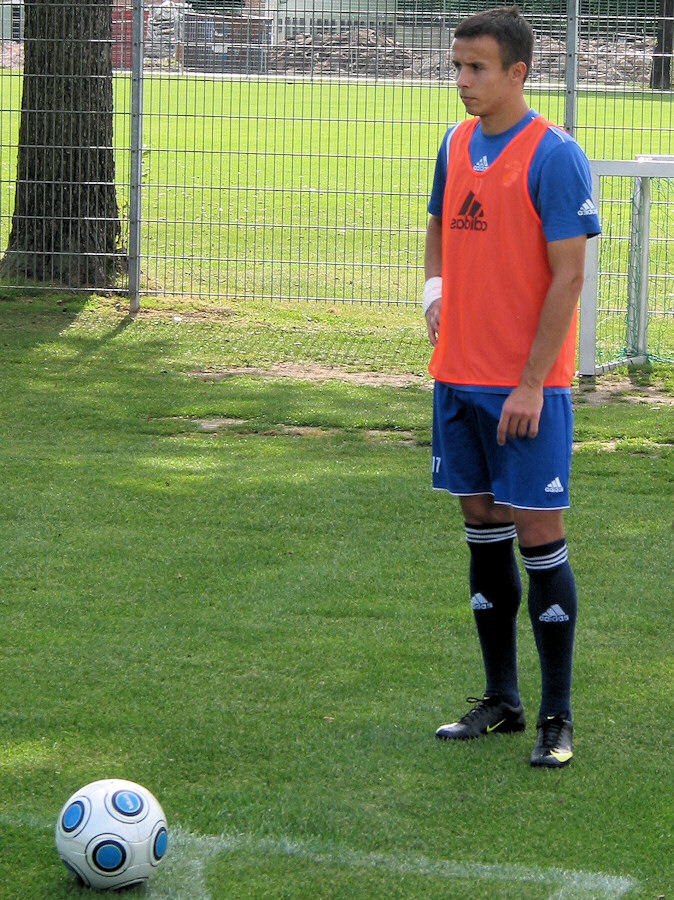

Personal information
- Full name: Timo Nagy
- Date of birth: 20 April 1983 (age 43)
- Place of birth: Altötting, West Germany
- Height: 1.79 m (5 ft 10 1/2 in)
- Position: Midfielder

Youth career
- 1989–1994: SV Gendorf-Burgkirchen
- 1994–1998: FC Bayern Munich

Senior career*
Years	Team	Apps	(Gls)
1998–2001	SV Wacker Burghausen II	54	(2)
2001–2004	SV Wacker Burghausen	13	(1)
2004–2007	Hannover 96	2	(0)
2007	→ Wacker Burghausen (loan)	14	(0)
2007–2009	SpVgg Unterhaching	47	(1)
2009–2011	Carl Zeiss Jena	34	(1)
2011–2012	SV Wehen Wiesbaden	3	(0)
- * Club domestic league appearances and goals as of 4 July 2012

Timo Nagy (born 20 April 1983) is a German football midfielder.
