= Stefan Jarosch =

German footballer

Personal information
- Full name: Stefan Jarosch
- Date of birth: 17 February 1984 (age 42)
- Place of birth: Böblingen, West Germany
- Height: 1.78 m (5 ft 10 in)
- Position: Right-back

Youth career
- 1988–1997: SpVgg Holzgerlingen
- 1997–2002: VfB Stuttgart

Senior career*
| Years | Team | Apps | (Gls) |
| 2002–2003 | VfB Stuttgart II | | |
| 2003–2004 | Wacker Burghausen | 5 | (0) |
| 2004–2011 | Jahn Regensburg | 156 | (4) |
| 2011–2012 | BC Aichach | | |

International career
| 2003–2004 | Germany U-20 | 2 | (0) |
- * Club domestic league appearances and goals

Stefan Jarosch (born 17 February 1984) is a German former professional footballer who played as a right-back. He is a former German U-20 international, made five appearances for SV Wacker Burghausen in the 2. Bundesliga and 78 for Jahn Regensburg in the 3. Liga during his playing career.
