= Cihan Kaptan =

German retired footballer (born 1989)

Personal information
- Full name: Cihan Kaan Kaptan
- Date of birth: 4 March 1989 (age 37)
- Place of birth: Wuppertal, West Germany
- Height: 1.76 m (5 ft 9 in)
- Position: Defensive midfielder

Youth career
- 1994–1996: Wuppertaler SV
- 1996–2007: Bayer 04 Leverkusen

Senior career*
Years	Team	Apps	(Gls)
2007–2010	Bursaspor	0	(0)
2010	Borussia Dortmund II	6	(0)
2011	Jahn Regensburg II	14	(0)
2011–2012	Sancaktepe		
2012–2014	Centone Karagümrük	48	(1)
2014–2015	Ofspor	35	(0)
2015	Wuppertaler SV	0	(0)
Total		103	(1)

International career
2004–2005	Germany U17	8	(0)
2007–2008	Germany U20	7	(0)
2009	Germany U20	4	(0)
- * Club domestic league appearances and goals

Cihan Kaptan (born 4 March 1989, in Wuppertal) is a German retired footballer.

== Career ==
Kaptan began his career by the Bambinis of Wuppertaler SV Borussia and signed 1996 a contract for D-Youth from Bayer 04 Leverkusen. With Bayer 04 Leverkusen he won the German A-youth Championship in 2007 (2–1 win in the final against Bayern Munich) and the youth A-German Cup in 2008 (3–1 in the final against Borussia Moenchengladbach). Kaptan won in his youth in twice the West German championship in 2007 and 2008. After twelve years at Bayer 04 Leverkusen he moved to the Süper Lig club Bursaspor. After only two Turkish Cup games in one and a half years at Bursaspor he joined in January 2010 Borussia Dortmund II, where he earned his first professional game on 7 February 2010 against Kickers Offenbach in the 3. Liga.

== International career ==
He earned his first international cap for the Germany national under-20 football team level against Turkey Under-20 football team in Kuşadası. Kaptan played as midfielder for the Germany U20 team in the 2009 FIFA U-20 World Cup.
