= Ricky Pinheiro =

Portuguese footballer

Personal information
- Full name: Ricardo Soares Pinheiro
- Date of birth: 1 February 1989 (age 37)
- Place of birth: Kaiserslautern, West Germany
- Height: 1.85 m (6 ft 1 in)
- Position: Midfielder

Team information
- Current team: SV Morlautern
- Number: 8

Youth career
- 1993–2007: 1. FC Kaiserslautern

Senior career*
Years	Team	Apps	(Gls)
2007–2011	FC Kaiserslautern II	46	(5)
2008–2010	→ FC Kaiserslautern	8	(1)
2010	→ VfL Osnabrück (loan)	14	(1)
2012	Borussia Neunkirchen	1	(0)
2012–2013	Hessen Kassel	35	(9)
2013–2014	FC Kaiserslautern II	17	(2)
2014–2015	SV Elversberg	40	(4)
2015–2018	Wormatia Worms	94	(12)
2018–2019	FK Pirmasens	31	(6)
2019–	SV Morlautern	8	(3)
- * Club domestic league appearances and goals as of 01:19, 2 November 2019 (UTC)

Ricardo "Ricky" Soares Pinheiro (born 1 February 1989 in Kaiserslautern, West Germany) is a Portuguese footballer who plays for SV Morlautern.

== Career ==
Pinheiro began his career with 1. FC Kaiserslautern and on 23 July 2009, he signed his first professional contract with the club. He made his debut on the professional league level in the 2. Bundesliga for the first team on 5 October 2008, when he came on as a substitute in the 81st minute in a game against TuS Koblenz. In December 2009, he was loaned to VfL Osnabrück until the end of the season.
