= Marko Kopilas =

Croatian footballer

Personal information
- Date of birth: 22 July 1983 (age 43)
- Place of birth: Sindelfingen, West Germany
- Height: 1.95 m (6 ft 5 in)
- Position: Defender

Youth career
- 1989–1994: SV Magstadt
- 1994–2000: VfB Stuttgart
- 2001: Stuttgarter Kickers

Senior career*
| Years | Team | Apps | (Gls) |
| 2001–2004 | SSV Reutlingen | 29 | (0) |
| 2004–2009 | Wehen Wiesbaden | 130 | (2) |
| 2009–2011 | Kickers Offenbach | 68 | (3) |
| 2012 | SV Darmstadt 98 | 7 | (0) |
| 2012–2013 | Rot-Weiß Erfurt | 16 | (0) |
| 2014–2016 | SV Wiesbaden | 75 | (1) |
| 2016–2017 | Rot-Weiss Frankfurt | 18 | (0) |
| 2017–2018 | SV Zeilsheim | 25 | (0) |
| 2018–2019 | Young Boys Reutlingen | 1 | (0) |
| Total | | 369 | (6) |

International career
| | Croatia U-21 | 11 | (0) |
- * Club domestic league appearances and goals

Marko Kopilas (born 22 July 1983) is a Croatian retired footballer. He also holds German citizenship.
