= Christopher Lamprecht =

German former footballer (born 1985)

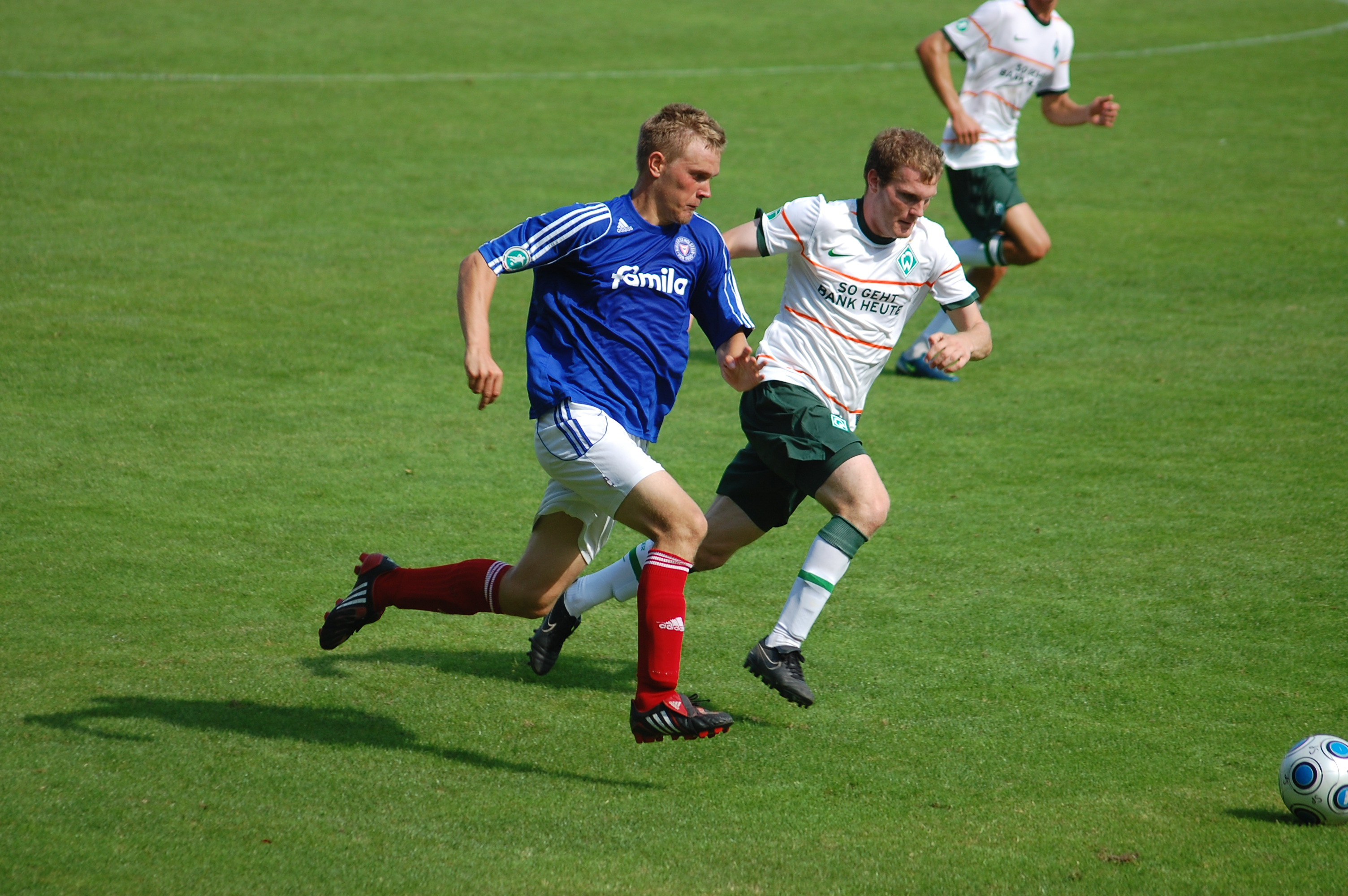

Personal information
- Date of birth: 22 April 1985 (age 41)
- Place of birth: Stendal, East Germany
- Height: 1.80 m (5 ft 11 in)
- Position: Defender

Team information
- Current team: VfR Kaiserslautern
- Number: 3

Youth career
- Rot-Weiss Arneburg
- –1999: 1. FC Lok Stendal
- 1999–2004: VfL Wolfsburg

Senior career*
Years	Team	Apps	(Gls)
2004–2008	VfL Wolfsburg II	43	(0)
2005–2008	VfL Wolfsburg	24	(3)
2008–2009	1. FC Kaiserslautern	12	(0)
2009–2010	Holstein Kiel	32	(2)
2010–2013	Kickers Offenbach	46	(2)
2014–2017	FV Weilerbach		
2017–	VfR Kaiserslautern	42	(10)

Managerial career
- 2019: VfR Kaiserslautern II
- 2019–: VfR Kaiserslautern
- * Club domestic league appearances and goals

Christopher Lamprecht (born 22 April 1985) is a German former footballer who played for VfR Kaiserslautern. He is a defender that can play right fullback as well as central defensive midfield.

== Career ==
Born in Stendal, East Germany, Lamprecht started his career as a youth player for German Bundesliga team VfL Wolfsburg, where he played since the age of 14. After joining their reserves in 2004, he signed a professional contract in July 2005. After two and a half years in the first squad, the new coach, former Bayern Munich coach Felix Magath, decided to loan him to 1. FC Kaiserslautern. He was able to impress Milan Šašić, the coach of 1. FC Kaiserslautern, at the time, who consequentially offered him a contract. However, his positive relationship with the coaching staff depleted after several mishaps, and he was transferred to Kaiserslautern's reserve squad in the Regionalliga West.

In July 2009, he was sold to Holstein Kiel where he believed to have a better perspective. On 30 July 2010, he signed a contract with Kickers Offenbach.
