= Florian Meyer (footballer) =

German footballer (born 1987)

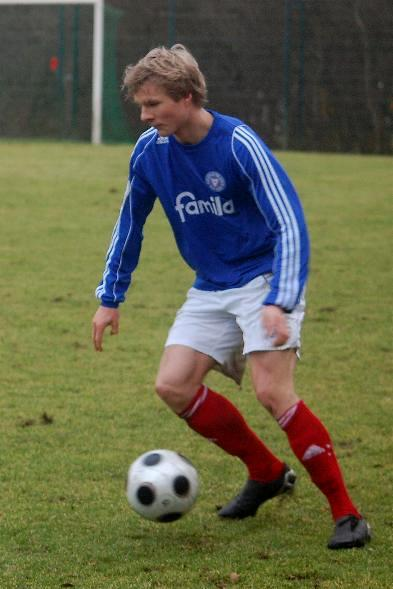
- Meyer in 2009

Personal information
- Full name: Florian Meyer
- Date of birth: 14 July 1987 (age 39)
- Place of birth: Preetz, West Germany
- Height: 1.75 m (5 ft 9 in)
- Position: Midfielder

Team information
- Current team: Weiche Flensburg
- Number: 15

Youth career
- 1994–2000: TSV Lütjenburg
- 2000–2001: Preetzer TSV
- 2001–2005: Holstein Kiel

Senior career*
| Years | Team | Apps | (Gls) |
| 2005–2013 | Holstein Kiel II | 68 | (27) |
| 2007–2013 | Holstein Kiel | 86 | (6) |
| 2013– | Weiche Flensburg | 151 | (23) |
- * Club domestic league appearances and goals as of 20:57, 8 December 2022 (UTC)

Florian Meyer (born 14 July 1987) is a German professional footballer who plays as a midfielder for Regionalliga Nord club SC Weiche Flensburg 08.
