= Florian Maier =

Austrian footballer

Personal information
- Date of birth: 7 January 1992 (age 34)
- Place of birth: Austria
- Height: 1.86 m (6 ft 1 in)
- Position: Centre back

Team information
- Current team: Hertha Wels
- Number: 5

Youth career
- 1998–2001: Union St. Marien
- 2001–2010: LASK Linz

Senior career*
Years	Team	Apps	(Gls)
2010–2011	LASK Linz II	37	(2)
2011–2012	SV Grödig II	3	(0)
2011–2012	SV Grödig	11	(0)
2012–2018	Blau-Weiß Linz	103	(9)
2018–2019	Stadl-Paura	24	(2)
2019–	Hertha Wels	25	(2)
- * Club domestic league appearances and goals as of 16:53, 26 October 2020 (UTC)

Florian Maier (born 7 January 1992) is an Austrian footballer who plays for WSC Hertha Wels.
