= Matthias Heidrich =

German footballer

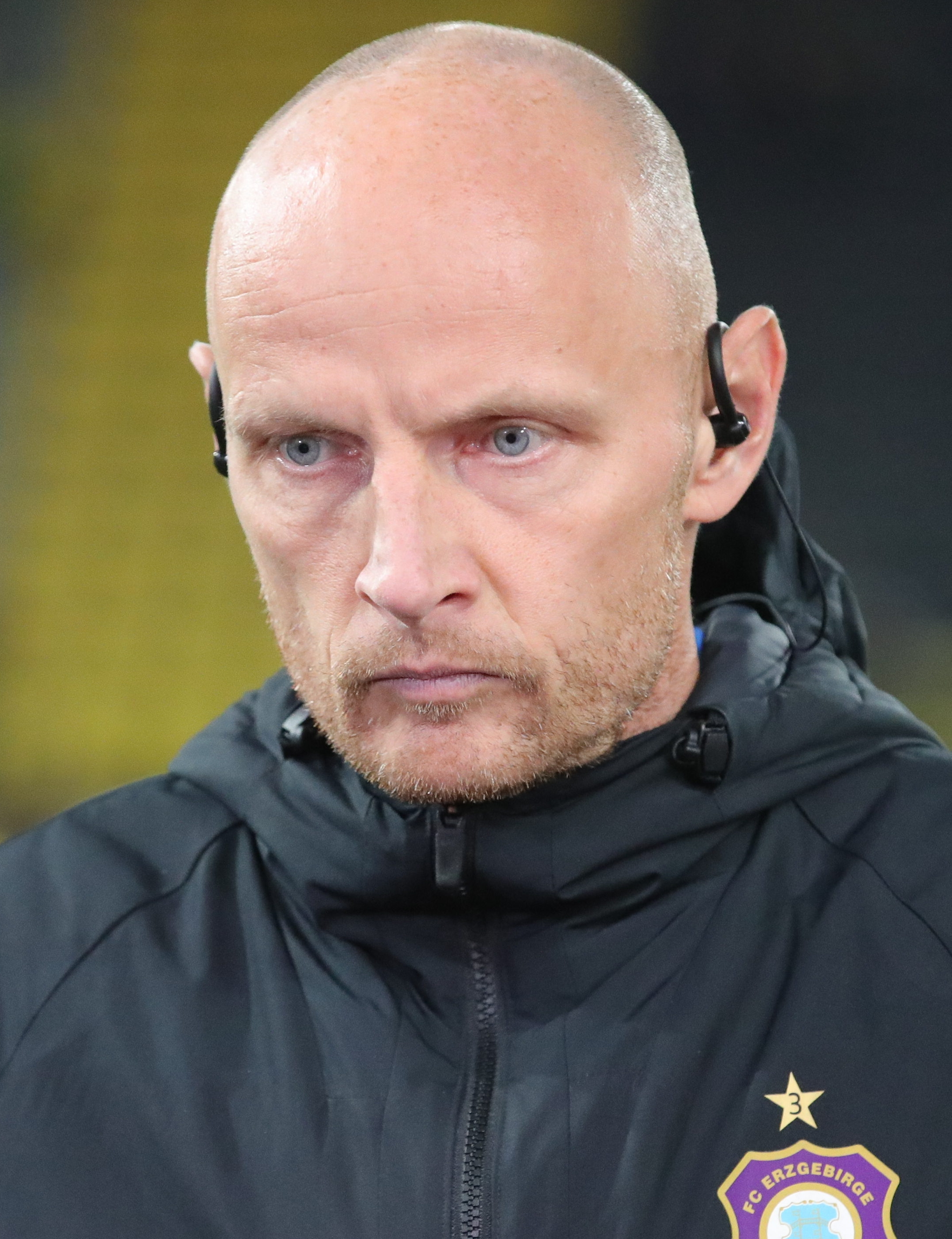
- Heidrich in 2008

Personal information
- Full name: Matthias Heidrich
- Date of birth: 10 December 1977 (age 48)
- Place of birth: Hoyerswerda, East Germany
- Height: 1.85 m (6 ft 1 in)
- Position: Defensive midfielder

Team information
- Current team: 1. FC Köln (head of youth)

Youth career
- –2000: FSV Hoyerswerda

Senior career*
Years	Team	Apps	(Gls)
2000–2005	Erzgebirge Aue	146	(18)
2005–2007	Alemannia Aachen	23	(0)
2007–2011	VfL Osnabrück	110	(12)
2011–2013	Wacker Burghausen	26	(0)
Total		305	(30)

Managerial career
- 2013–2018: Energie Cottbus (head of youth)
- 2015–2016: Energie Cottbus II
- 2018–: 1. FC Köln (head of youth)
- * Club domestic league appearances and goals

Matthias Heidrich (born 10 December 1977, in Hoyerswerda) is a German former professional footballer who played as a defensive midfielder. He works for 1. FC Köln as head of youth department.
