= Marco Riemer =

German footballer

Personal information
- Date of birth: 24 February 1988 (age 38)
- Place of birth: Apolda, East Germany
- Height: 1.81 m (5 ft 11 in)
- Position: Midfielder

Team information
- Current team: FC Einheit Rudolstadt
- Number: 10

Senior career*
Years	Team	Apps	(Gls)
2007–2011	Carl Zeiss Jena	82	(5)
2011–2012	Preußen Münster	17	(1)
2012–2014	Carl Zeiss Jena	46	(5)
2015–	FC Einheit Rudolstadt	176	(60)
- * Club domestic league appearances and goals as of 12 November 2022

Marco Riemer (born 24 February 1988) is a German football midfielder who plays for FC Einheit Rudolstadt. He played in the 2. Bundesliga for Carl Zeiss Jena.
