= David Vržogić =

German footballer

Personal information
- Full name: David Vržogić
- Date of birth: 10 August 1989 (age 37)
- Place of birth: Wuppertal, West Germany
- Height: 1.80 m (5 ft 11 in)
- Position: Left-back

Team information
- Current team: ASC GW 49 Wielen
- Number: 27

Youth career
- –1998: Grün-Weiß Wuppertal
- 1998–2006: Borussia Dortmund

Senior career*
Years	Team	Apps	(Gls)
2006–2010	Borussia Dortmund II	61	(1)
2010–2011	Rot Weiss Ahlen	34	(1)
2011–2014	Bayern Munich II	45	(1)
2014–2015	Dynamo Dresden	28	(0)
2015–2016	Alemannia Aachen	21	(1)
2016–2020	SV Meppen	59	(1)
2020–	ASC GW 49 Wielen	0	(0)

International career
	Germany U-19	11	(0)
	Germany U-20	4	(0)
- * Club domestic league appearances and goals as of 14:40, 3 August 2020 (UTC)

David Vržogić (born 10 August 1989) is a German professional footballer who plays as a left-back for ASC GW 49 Wielen.

== Club career ==
Vržogić began his career with Borussia Dortmund, and broke into the reserve team in 2006, making his debut six days before his eighteenth birthday, in a 0–0 draw with Kickers Emden in the Regionalliga Nord. He was promoted to the Dortmund first-team in 2007, but would never make an appearance, remaining with the reserves. In 2008, the Regionalliga was restructured, with Dortmund II moved to the Regionalliga West, which they won at the first attempt, although Vržogić missed much of the season through injury. The team qualified for the 3. Liga, and Vržogić made 28 appearances at this level, but the team were relegated, and he left Dortmund.

Vržogić remained in the 3. Liga, joining Rot Weiss Ahlen, where he was a first-team regular during the 2010–11 season, but the club suffered financial difficulties and were forcibly relegated. Most of the squad left the club, with Vržogić joining Bayern Munich II. He made 28 appearances for the team in his first season, but his time since then was marred by injury. He returned to the team for the 2013–14 season, as they won the Regionalliga Bayern title, but missed promotion after losing to Fortuna Köln in a playoff. At the end of the season he signed for Dynamo Dresden.

== International career ==
Vržogić played for various levels of the Germany youth team, and was in the squads for the 2006 UEFA Under-17 Championship and the 2009 FIFA U-20 World Cup.

== Personal life ==
He is of Serbian descent.
