= Marcel Höttecke =

German footballer (born 1987)

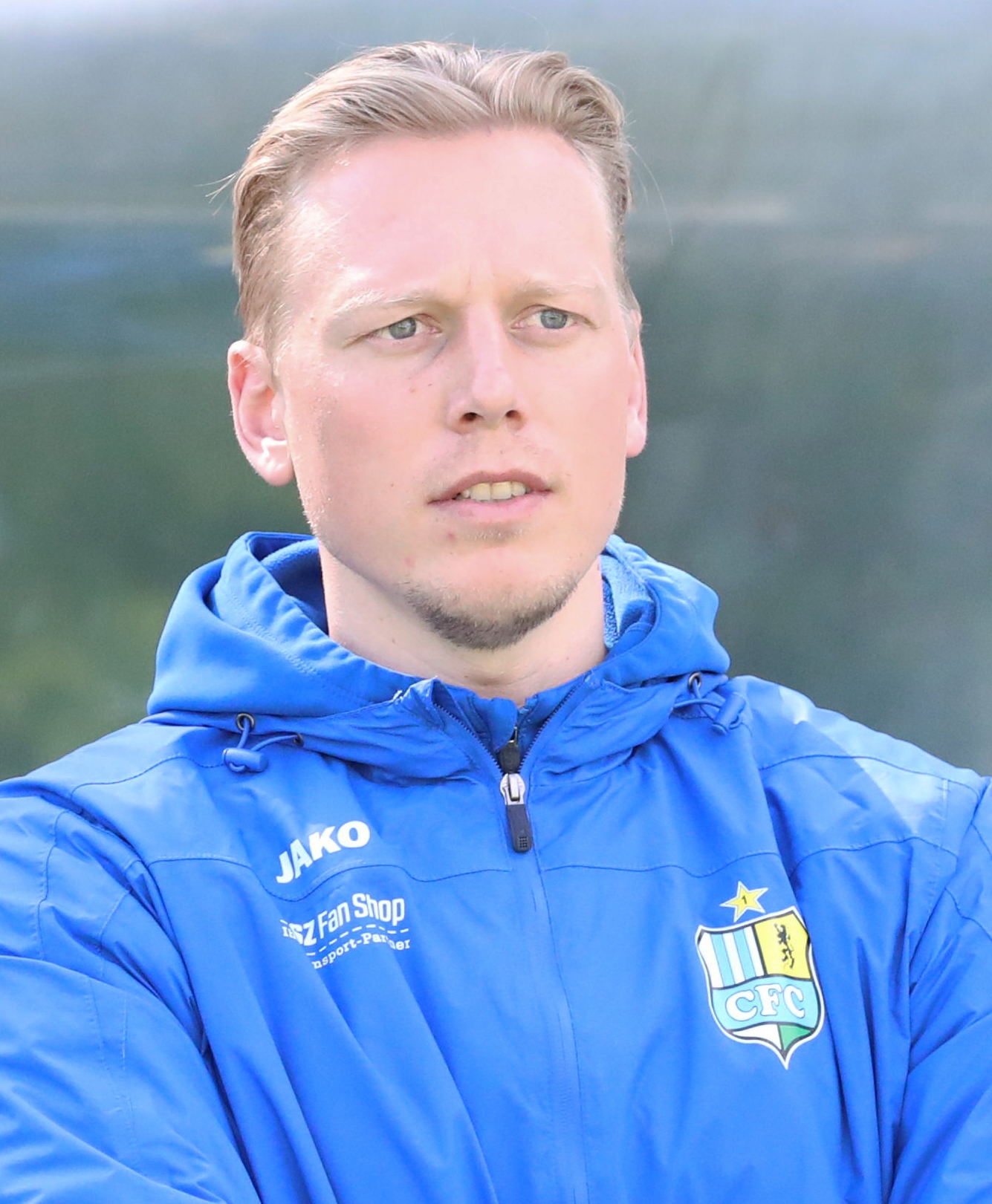
- Höttecke in 2021

Personal information
- Full name: Marcel Höttecke
- Date of birth: 25 April 1987 (age 39)
- Place of birth: Lippstadt, West Germany
- Height: 1.99 m (6 ft 6 in)
- Position: Goalkeeper

Team information
- Current team: Borussia Mönchengladbach (goalkeeping coach)
- Number: 1

Youth career
- TSV Rüthen
- SC Lippstadt
- –2003: Westfalia Erwitte
- 2004–2006: Rot Weiss Ahlen U-19

Senior career*
Years	Team	Apps	(Gls)
2006–2007	Rot Weiss Ahlen II	2	(0)
2006–2007	Rot Weiss Ahlen	0	(0)
2007–2010	Borussia Dortmund II	63	(0)
2008–2010	Borussia Dortmund	5	(0)
2010–2013	Union Berlin	19	(0)
2013–2014	Berliner AK 07	13	(0)
2014–2016	SV Lippstadt	27	(0)
Total		129	(0)

International career
	Germany U-20	3	(0)
- * Club domestic league appearances and goals

Marcel Höttecke (born 25 April 1987) is a German former professional football goalkeeper.

== Career ==
Höttecke was born in Lippstadt. He played mainly for Borussia Dortmund II but has played in the first team due to injuries of regular keepers Roman Weidenfeller and Marc Ziegler. His first match in Bundesliga was on 16 April 2008 losing to Hannover 96 3–1. On 20 April 2010, it was announced that he would transfer to 1. FC Union Berlin at the end of the season.
