= 2012–13 1. FC Saarbrücken season =

1. FC Saarbrücken
2012–13 season
- Chairman: Paul Borgard
- Manager: Jürgen Luginger
- Stadium: Ludwigsparkstadion, Saarbrücken, Saarland
- 3. Liga: TBD
- DFB-Pokal: First round
- Saarland Cup: TBD
- Highest home attendance: 28.000 (v. Schalke 04)
- Lowest home attendance: 3.402 (v. Wacker Burghausen)

The 2012–13 1. FC Saarbrücken season is the 106th season in the club's football history. In 2012–13 the club plays in the 3. Liga, the third tier of German football. It is the club's third season in this league, having been promoted from the Regionalliga in 2010. They are also participating in the DFB-Pokal and Saarland Cup.

== Review and events ==
The club also took part in the 2012–13 edition of the DFB-Pokal, the German Cup, but was knocked out in the first round by Fußball-Bundesliga side FC Schalke 04.

1. FC Saarbrücken also takes part in the 2012–13 edition of the Saarland Cup, entering the third round with a match against SV Altstadt on 18 September.

== Matches ==
=== Legend ===
Win Draw Loss Postponed

=== 3. Liga ===
Match	Date	Time	Venue	City	Opponent	Result	Attendance	Saarbrücken goalscorers	Source
1	21 July 2012	14:15	Gazi-Stadion auf der Waldau	Stuttgart	VfB Stuttgart II	1–0	1.525		
2	28 July 2012	14:00	Ludwigsparkstadion	Saarbrücken	VfL Osnabrück	0–1	5.682	—	
3	3 August 2012	19:00	Schüco Arena	Bielefeld	Arminia Bielefeld	2–3	7.423		
4	7 August 2012	19:00	Ludwigsparkstadion	Saarbrücken	Alemannia Aachen	1–2	6.377		
5	11 August 2012	14:00	Stadion Rote Erde	Dortmund	Borussia Dortmund II	2–1	3.150		
6	25 August 2012	14:00	Ludwigsparkstadion	Saarbrücken	Wacker Burghausen	3–0	3.402		
7	28 August 2012	19:00	Ludwigsparkstadion	Saarbrücken	Kickers Offenbach	2–2	4.881		
8	2 September 2012	14:00	Wildparkstadion	Karlsruhe	Karlsruher SC	0–3	14.317	—	
9	15 September 2012	14:00	Ludwigsparkstadion	Saarbrücken	Rot-Weiß Erfurt	0–2	3.705	—	
10	22 September 2012	14:00	Gazi-Stadion auf der Waldau	Stuttgart	Stuttgarter Kickers	2–1	4.100		
11	26 September 2012	19:00	Ludwigsparkstadion	Saarbrücken	SpVgg Unterhaching				
12	29 September 2012	14:00	Karl-Liebknecht-Stadion	Potsdam	Babelsberg 03				
13									
14									
15									
16									
17									
18									
19									
20									
21									
22									
23									
24									
25									
26									
27									
28									
29									
30									
31									
32									
33									
34									
35									
36									
37									
38									

=== DFB-Pokal ===
19 August 2012 1st Round	1. FC Saarbrücken	0 – 5	Schalke 04	Saarbrücken
16:00		Report		Stadium: Ludwigsparkstadion; Attendance: 28.000; Referee: Tobias Welz
