= List of German football transfers summer 2010 =

This is a list of German football transfers in the summer 2010 transfer window by club.

== Bundesliga ==
=== FC Bayern Munich ===
In:

Out:

Note: Flags indicate national team as has been defined under FIFA eligibility rules. Players may hold more than one non-FIFA nationality.

No.	Pos.	Nation	Player
2	DF	BRA	Breno (loan return from 1. FC Nürnberg)
4	DF	NED	Edson Braafheid (loan return from Celtic F.C.)
16	MF	GER	Andreas Ottl (loan return from 1. FC Nürnberg)
27	MF	AUT	David Alaba (from FC Bayern Munich II)
39	MF	GER	Toni Kroos (loan return from Bayer 04 Leverkusen)

No.	Pos.	Nation	Player
1	GK	GER	Michael Rensing (released)
9	FW	ITA	Luca Toni (to Genoa C.F.C., previously on loan at AS Roma)
13	DF	GER	Andreas Görlitz (to FC Ingolstadt)
20	MF	ARG	José Ernesto Sosa (to SSC Napoli, previously on loan at Estudiantes de la Plata)
30	DF	GER	Christian Lell (to Hertha BSC)
32	MF	GER	Mehmet Ekici (on loan to 1. FC Nürnberg)
--	DF	GER	Georg Niedermeier (to VfB Stuttgart, previously on loan)

=== FC Schalke 04 ===
In:

No.	Pos.	Nation	Player
2	DF	GHA	Hans Sarpei (from Bayer 04 Leverkusen)
3	DF	ESP	Sergio Escudero (from Real Murcia)
5	DF	FRA	Nicolas Plestan (from OSC Lille)
6	DF	GER	Tim Hoogland (from 1. FSV Mainz 05)
7	FW	ESP	Raúl (from Real Madrid)
14	DF	GRE	Kyriakos Papadopoulos (from Olympiacos F.C.)
18	MF	ESP	José Manuel Jurado (from Atlético Madrid)
21	DF	GER	Christoph Metzelder (from Real Madrid)
22	DF	JPN	Atsuto Uchida (from Kashima Antlers)
25	FW	NED	Klaas-Jan Huntelaar (from A.C. Milan)
26	FW	SVK	Erik Jendrišek (from 1. FC Kaiserslautern)
27	MF	ROU	Ciprian Deac (from CFR Cluj)
36	GK	GER	Lars Unnerstall (from FC Schalke 04 II)
38	FW	GER	Marvin Pourie (loan return from TuS Koblenz)

Out:

No.	Pos.	Nation	Player
2	DF	GER	Heiko Westermann (to Hamburger SV)
3	DF	NOR	Tore Reginiussen (on loan to U.S. Lecce)
5	DF	BRA	Marcelo Bordon (to Al-Rayyan Sports Club)
8	MF	BRA	Mineiro (released)
14	FW	GER	Gerald Asamoah (to FC St. Pauli)
15	MF	BRA	Zé Roberto (on loan to CR Vasco da Gama)
18	DF	BRA	Rafinha (to Genoa C.F.C.)
16	MF	CZE	Jan Morávek (on loan to 1. FC Kaiserslautern)
22	FW	GER	Kevin Kurányi (to Dynamo Moscow)
23	MF	TUR	Emin Yalin (Göztepe A.Ş.)
25	DF	PER	Carlos Zambrano (on loan to FC St. Pauli)
27	FW	URU	Vicente Sánchez (to CF America)
35	GK	GER	Mohamed Amsif (to FC Augsburg)
—	MF	URU	Carlos Grossmüller (released, previously on loan at FC Danubio Montevideo)
—	MF	GER	Lewis Holtby (on loan to FSV Mainz 05, previously on loan at VfL Bochum)

=== Werder Bremen ===
In:

No.	Pos.	Nation	Player
5	MF	BRA	Wesley (from Santos)
7	FW	AUT	Marko Arnautović (from FC Twente, previously on loan at Internazionale)
16	DF	FRA	Mikaël Silvestre (from Arsenal F.C.)
18	FW	GER	Felix Kroos (from F.C. Hansa Rostock)
28	MF	GER	Kevin Schindler (loan return from MSV Duisburg)
42	GK	GER	Felix Wiedwald (from Werder Bremen II)

Out:

No.	Pos.	Nation	Player
7	MF	CRO	Jurica Vranješ (to SV Werder Bremen II, previously on loan at Gençlerbirliği S.K.)
9	FW	SWE	Markus Rosenberg (on loan to Racing Santander)
11	MF	GER	Mesut Özil (to Real Madrid C.F.)
16	DF	TUN	Aymen Abdennour (loan return to Etoile du Sahel)
25	MF	GER	Peter Niemeyer (on loan to Hertha BSC)
30	FW	HUN	Márkó Futács (on loan to FC Ingolstadt 04)
31	MF	GER	Kevin Artmann (to Werder Bremen II)
34	FW	AUT	Martin Harnik (to VfB Stuttgart, previously on loan at Fortuna Düsseldorf)
47	FW	GER	Torsten Oehrl (to FC Augsburg, previously on loan at Fortuna Düsseldorf)
—	MF	BRA	Carlos Alberto (to CR Vasco da Gama, previously on loan)

=== Bayer 04 Leverkusen ===
In:

No.	Pos.	Nation	Player
13	MF	GER	Michael Ballack (from Chelsea F.C.)
14	MF	GER	Hanno Balitsch (from Hannover 96)
18	MF	GER	Sidney Sam (from Hamburger SV, previously on loan at 1. FC Kaiserslautern)
17	MF	CRO	Domagoj Vida (from NK Osijek)
31	MF	DEN	Nicolai Jørgensen (from Akademisk Boldklub)
--	MF	CRO	Zvonko Pamić (from NK Karlovac)

Out:

No.	Pos.	Nation	Player
14	MF	GER	Sascha Dum (to Fortuna Düsseldorf, previously on loan at FC Energie Cottbus)
15	MF	GHA	Hans Sarpei (to FC Schalke 04)
18	MF	POL	Tomasz Zdebel (to Alemannia Aachen)
20	DF	GER	Lukas Sinkiewicz (to FC Augsburg)
21	MF	GER	Marcel Risse (on loan to 1. FSV Mainz 05, previously on loan at 1. FC Nürnberg)
29	FW	GRE	Theofanis Gekas (to Eintracht Frankfurt, previously on loan at Hertha BSC)
39	MF	GER	Toni Kroos (loan return to FC Bayern Munich)
45	DF	GER	Jens Hegeler (on loan to 1. FC Nürnberg, previously on loan at FC Augsburg)
--	DF	GRE	Athanasios Petsos (on loan to FC Kaiserslautern)
--	MF	CRO	Zvonko Pamić (on loan to SC Freiburg)

=== Borussia Dortmund ===
In:

No.	Pos.	Nation	Player
2	DF	GER	Lasse Sobiech (from Borussia Dortmund U-19)
6	MF	GER	Florian Kringe (loan return from Hertha BSC)
7	FW	POL	Robert Lewandowski (from Lech Poznań)
20	GK	AUS	Mitchell Langerak (from Melbourne Victory)
23	MF	JPN	Shinji Kagawa (from Cerezo Osaka)
26	MF	POL	Łukasz Piszczek (from Hertha BSC)
28	FW	GER	Daniel Ginczek (from Borussia Dortmund U-19)
39	FW	GER	Marco Stiepermann (from Borussia Dortmund U-19)
44	DF	GER	Marc Hornschuh (from Borussia Dortmund U-19)
45	MF	BRA	Antônio da Silva (from Karlsruher SC)

Out:

No.	Pos.	Nation	Player
7	MF	BRA	Tinga (to Internacional)
9	FW	PAR	Nelson Valdez (to Hércules CF)
20	GK	GER	Marc Ziegler (to VfB Stuttgart)
21	DF	GER	Uwe Hünemeier (to FC Energie Cottbus)
28	MF	POL	Sebastian Tyrała (to VfL Osnabrück)
33	MF	GER	David Vržogić (to Rot-Weiss Ahlen)
34	FW	GER	Bajram Sadrijaj (released)
39	FW	GER	Christopher Kullmann (to Borussia Dortmund II)
40	GK	GER	Marcel Höttecke (to 1. FC Union Berlin)
45	MF	GER	Julian Koch (on loan to MSV Duisburg)

=== VfB Stuttgart ===
In:

No.	Pos.	Nation	Player
2	DF	SUI	Philipp Degen (on loan from Liverpool F.C.)
3	DF	ITA	Christian Molinaro (from Juventus FC, previously on loan)
6	DF	GER	Georg Niedermeier (from FC Bayern Munich, previously on loan)
7	FW	AUT	Martin Harnik (from SV Werder Bremen, previously on loan at Fortuna Düsseldorf)
11	MF	FRA	Johan Audel (from Valenciennes FC)
14	MF	GER	Patrick Funk (from VfB Stuttgart II)
16	MF	ITA	Mauro Camoranesi (from Juventus FC)
20	MF	GER	Christian Gentner (from VfL Wolfsburg)
23	GK	GER	Marc Ziegler (from Borussia Dortmund)
24	MF	GUI	Mamadou Bah (from RC Strasbourg)
25	MF	BRA	Élson (loan return from Hannover 96)
26	MF	GER	Daniel Didavi (from VfB Stuttgart II)

Out:

No.	Pos.	Nation	Player
1	GK	GER	Jens Lehmann (retired)
3	MF	MEX	Ricardo Osorio (to C.F. Monterrey)
7	DF	GER	Martin Lanig (to 1. FC Köln)
16	MF	GER	Sebastian Rudy (to TSG 1899 Hoffenheim)
19	MF	GER	Roberto Hilbert (to Beşiktaş J.K.)
23	MF	BLR	Alexander Hleb (loan return to FC Barcelona)
24	MF	AUT	Clemens Walch (to 1. FC Kaiserslautern)
28	MF	GER	Sami Khedira (to Real Madrid)
29	MF	CMR	Georges Mandjeck (to Stade Rennais F.C., previously on loan at 1. FC Kaiserslautern)
30	FW	GER	Manuel Fischer (on loan to SV Wacker Burghausen)
34	GK	GER	Frank Lehmann (to 1. FC Heidenheim, previously on loan at FC Energie Cottbus)
39	FW	GER	Julian Schieber (on loan to 1. FC Nürnberg)

=== Hamburger SV ===
In:

No.	Pos.	Nation	Player
2	DF	GER	Dennis Diekmeier (from 1. FC Nürnberg)
4	DF	GER	Heiko Westermann (from FC Schalke 04)
17	FW	CMR	Eric Maxim Choupo-Moting (loan return from 1. FC Nürnberg)
23	DF	GER	Lennard Sowah (from Portsmouth FC)
28	MF	SEN	Mickaël Tavares (loan return from 1. FC Nürnberg)
32	MF	GER	Änis Ben-Hatira (loan return from MSV Duisburg)
44	MF	SRB	Gojko Kačar (from Hertha BSC)
45	GK	CZE	Jaroslav Drobný (from Hertha BSC)

Out:

No.	Pos.	Nation	Player
3	DF	CZE	David Rozehnal (on loan to Lille OSC)
4	DF	GER	Bastian Reinhardt (retired)
12	GK	GER	Wolfgang Hesl (on loan to SV Ried)
16	FW	SWE	Marcus Berg (on loan to PSV Eindhoven)
17	DF	GER	Jérôme Boateng (to Manchester City F.C.)
19	MF	TUR	Tolgay Arslan (on loan to Alemannia Aachen)
28	MF	SEN	Mickaël Tavares (on loan to Middlesbrough F.C.)
31	FW	GER	Maximilian Beister (on loan to Fortuna Düsseldorf)
32	MF	GER	Änis Ben-Hatira (to Hamburger SV II)
34	DF	GER	Kai-Fabian Schulz (on loan to FSV Frankfurt)
—	MF	GER	Sidney Sam (to Bayer 04 Leverkusen, previously on loan at 1. FC Kaiserslautern)

=== VfL Wolfsburg ===
In:

No.	Pos.	Nation	Player
3	DF	GER	Arne Friedrich (from Hertha BSC)
11	MF	BRA	Cícero (on loan from Tombense Futebol Clube, previously on loan at Hertha BSC)
18	FW	CRO	Mario Mandžukić (from Dinamo Zagreb)
21	MF	SUI	Nassim Ben Khalifa (from Grasshopper Zürich)
28	MF	BRA	Diego (from Juventus FC)
31	FW	BRA	Caiuby (loan return from MSV Duisburg)
34	DF	DEN	Simon Kjær (from US Palermo)
--	DF	GER	Michael Thielke (from VfL Wolfsburg U-17)
--	DF	GER	Philip Hauck (from VfL Wolfsburg U-17)
--	MF	TUR	Tolga Ciğerci (from VfL Wolfsburg U-19)
--	FW	GER	Kevin Scheidhauer (from VfL Wolfsburg U-19)

Out:

No.	Pos.	Nation	Player
5	DF	BRA	Réver (to Atletico Mineiro)
6	DF	CZE	Jan Šimůnek (to 1. FC Kaiserslautern)
10	MF	BIH	Zvjezdan Misimović (to Galatasaray S.K.)
11	FW	NGR	Obafemi Martins (to Rubin Kazan)
14	MF	PAR	Jonathan Santana (to Kayserispor)
25	MF	GER	Christian Gentner (to VfB Stuttgart)
27	MF	GER	Alexander Laas (to RB Leipzig)
27	FW	GER	Alexander Esswein (to Dynamo Dresden)
33	DF	GER	Daniel Reiche (to MSV Duisburg)
36	MF	GER	Dennis Riemer (on loan to TuS Koblenz)
--	MF	GER	Daniel Adlung (to FC Energie Cottbus, previously on loan at Alemannia Aachen)
--	FW	TUR	Mahir Sağlık (to VfL Bochum, previously on loan at SC Paderborn 07)
--	MF	ROU	Vlad Munteanu (to VfL Wolfsburg II, previously on loan at FSV Frankfurt)

=== 1. FSV Mainz ===
In:

No.	Pos.	Nation	Player
1	GK	GER	Martin Pieckenhagen (from Heracles Almelo)
6	MF	GER	Marco Caligiuri (from SpVgg Greuther Fürth)
9	MF	TUN	Sami Allagui (from Greuther Fürth)
11	FW	DEN	Morten Rasmussen (on loan from Celtic F.C.)
13	MF	GER	Marcel Risse (on loan from Bayer 04 Leverkusen, previously on loan at 1. FC Nürnberg)
17	MF	NGR	Haruna Babangida (from FC Kuban Krasnodar)
18	MF	GER	Lewis Holtby (on loan from FC Schalke 04, previously on loan at VfL Bochum)
22	DF	AUT	Christian Fuchs (on loan from VfL Bochum)
28	FW	HUN	Ádám Szalai (from Real Madrid Castilla, previously on loan)
34	DF	GER	Stefan Bell (from FSV Mainz 05 U-19)
36	FW	MKD	Dragan Georgiev (on loan from FK Turnovo)
--	MF	GER	Mario Vrančić (loan return from Rot Weiss Ahlen)

Out:

No.	Pos.	Nation	Player
1	GK	GER	Dimo Wache (retired)
6	DF	GER	Tim Hoogland (to FC Schalke 04)
11	FW	CZE	Filip Trojan (on loan to MSV Duisburg)
17	DF	GER	Marco Rose (to 1. FSV Mainz II)
22	FW	ALG	Chadli Amri (to 1. FC Kaiserslautern)
22	MF	TUR	Tufan Tosunoğlu (to FSV Frankfurt)
23	FW	BFA	Aristide Bancé (to Al Ahli)
32	FW	MNE	Dragan Bogavac (released)
34	DF	GER	Stefan Bell (on loan to 1860 Munich)
36	FW	MKD	Dragan Georgiev (on loan to SC Paderborn)
--	MF	ALB	Jahmir Hyka (to Panionios)

=== Eintracht Frankfurt ===
In:

No.	Pos.	Nation	Player
20	MF	GER	Sebastian Rode (from Kickers Offenbach)
21	FW	GRE	Theofanis Gekas (from Bayer 04 Leverkusen, previously on loan at Hertha BSC)
26	GK	GER	Andreas Rössl (from Eintracht Frankfurt U23)
28	MF	GER	Sonny Kittel (from Eintracht Frankfurt U17)
31	MF	GRE	Georgios Tzavelas (from Panionios)
33	MF	GER	Markus Steinhöfer (loan return from 1. FC Kaiserslautern)

Out:

No.	Pos.	Nation	Player
3	DF	SRB	Nikola Petković (on loan to Tom Tomsk)
6	MF	GER	Selim Teber (to Kayserispor)
10	FW	GRE	Nikos Liberopoulos (to AEK Athens F.C.)
16	DF	SUI	Christoph Spycher (to BSC Young Boys)
19	DF	ALG	Habib Bellaïd (on loan to CS Sedan Ardennes, previously on loan at US Boulogne)
21	GK	GER	Markus Pröll (released)
26	FW	GER	Juvhel Tsoumou (to Alemannia Aachen)
27	DF	GER	Alexander Krük (to VfL Osnabrück, previously on loan)
28	GK	GER	Jan Zimmermann (released)
32	MF	GER	Faton Toski (to VfL Bochum)

=== 1899 Hoffenheim ===
In:

No.	Pos.	Nation	Player
6	MF	GER	Sebastian Rudy (from VfB Stuttgart)
11	MF	ISL	Gylfi Sigurðsson (from Reading F.C.)
15	FW	GER	Peniel Mlapa (from TSV 1860 Munich)
27	GK	AUT	Ramazan Özcan (loan return from Beşiktaş J.K.)
33	GK	GER	Tom Starke (from MSV Duisburg)
--	DF	DEN	Jannik Vestergaard (from Brøndby IF)

Out:

No.	Pos.	Nation	Player
7	MF	BRA	Maicosuel (to Botafogo FR)
10	MF	BRA	Carlos Eduardo (to Rubin Kazan)
12	FW	BRA	Wellington (on loan to Fortuna Düsseldorf, previously on loan at FC Twente)
22	DF	FIN	Jukka Raitala (on loan to SC Paderborn)
24	DF	SWE	Per Nilsson (to 1. FC Nürnberg)
28	GK	GER	Timo Hildebrand (released)
36	MF	ARG	Franco Zuculini (on loan to Genoa C.F.C.)

=== Borussia Mönchengladbach ===
In:

No.	Pos.	Nation	Player
2	DF	GER	Sebastian Schachten (loan return from SC Paderborn 07)
5	MF	BRA	Bamba Anderson (from Tombense Futebol Clube, previously on loan at Fortuna Düsseldorf)
10	FW	BEL	Igor de Camargo (from Standard Liège)
15	MF	GER	Patrick Herrmann (from Borussia Mönchengladbach U-19)
17	DF	AUT	Bernhard Janeczek (from Borussia Mönchengladbach U-19)
21	GK	GER	Marc-André ter Stegen (from Borussia Mönchengladbach U-19)
27	DF	GER	Jens Wissing (from Preußen Münster)
25	FW	CMR	Mohammadou Idrissou (from SC Freiburg)

Out:

No.	Pos.	Nation	Player
9	FW	ISR	Roberto Colautti (to Maccabi Tel Aviv F.C.)
15	DF	GER	Thomas Kleine (to SpVgg Greuther Fürth)
16	FW	CAN	Rob Friend (to Hertha BSC)
21	GK	GER	Frederic Löhe (on loan to SV Sandhausen)
25	FW	NGR	Moses Lamidi (to Rot-Weiß Oberhausen)
27	FW	GER	Oliver Neuville (to Arminia Bielefeld)

=== 1. FC Köln ===
In:

No.	Pos.	Nation	Player
5	MF	GER	Martin Lanig (from VfB Stuttgart)
12	DF	BRA	Andrézinho (from Vitória S.C.)
14	FW	ROU	Alexandru Ioniţă (from Rapid Bucharest)
18	DF	GRE	Kostas Giannoulis (from Iraklis)
19	MF	CRO	Mato Jajalo (on loan from AC Siena)
29	MF	GER	Christopher Buchtmann (from Fulham F.C. Reserves)
34	GK	CRO	Miro Varvodić (from Hajduk Split, previously on loan)

Out:

No.	Pos.	Nation	Player
4	DF	GER	Marvin Matip (to FC Ingolstadt 04, previously on loan at Karlsruher SC)
6	DF	CMR	Pierre Womé (released)
9	FW	NGR	Manasseh Ishiaku (released)
12	MF	POR	Maniche (released)
14	MF	SRB	Zoran Tošić (loan return to Manchester United)
18	GK	GER	Thomas Kessler (on loan to FC St. Pauli)
26	MF	GER	Lukas Nottbeck (to TuS Koblenz, previously on loan at Borussia Dortmund II)
29	FW	GER	Sebastian Zielinsky (to FC Ingolstadt 04)
30	FW	GER	Michael Gardawski (on loan to VfB Stuttgart II, previously on loan at FC Carl Zeiss Jena)

=== SC Freiburg ===
In:

No.	Pos.	Nation	Player
8	MF	GER	Jan Rosenthal (from Hannover 96)
10	MF	ROU	Maximilian Nicu (from Hertha BSC)
14	MF	CRO	Zvonko Pamić (on loan from Bayer 04 Leverkusen)
17	MF	CMR	Alain Junior Ollé Ollé (loan return from Rot Weiss Ahlen)
22	FW	JPN	Kisho Yano (from Albirex Niigata)]
28	DF	GER	Danny Williams (from SC Freiburg II)
--	GK	GER	Michael Müller (loan return from 1. FC Saarbrücken)
--	MF	BLR	Anton Putsila (from Dinamo Minsk)

Out:

No.	Pos.	Nation	Player
4	MF	TUN	Hamed Namouchi (released)
6	DF	KOR	Cha Du-Ri (to Celtic F.C.)
8	FW	CMR	Mohammadou Idrissou (to Borussia Mönchengladbach)
19	FW	GER	Andreas Glockner (to 1. FC Heidenheim, previously on loan at TuS Koblenz)
21	GK	AUT	Michael Langer (to FSV Frankfurt)
25	MF	ITA	Sandro Sirigu (to 1. FC Heidenheim)
30	MF	GEO	David Targamadze (released)
--	MF	NGR	Eke Uzoma (to TSV 1860 Munich, previously on loan)

=== Hannover 96 ===
In:

No.	Pos.	Nation	Player
4	DF	AUT	Emanuel Pogatetz (from Middlesbrough F.C.)
30	MF	POR	Carlitos (from FC Basel)
14	GK	GER	Markus Miller (from Karlsruher SC)
16	MF	USA	DaMarcus Beasley (from Rangers F.C.)
17	FW	GER	Moritz Stoppelkamp (from Rot-Weiss Oberhausen)
20	GK	GER	Ron-Robert Zieler (from Manchester United F.C.)
25	FW	NOR	Mohammed Abdellaoue (from Vålerenga)
28	MF	GER	Lars Stindl (from Karlsruher SC)
36	MF	GER	Willi Evseev (from Hannover 96 U-19)
--	DF	NGR	Christopher Avevor (from Hannover 96 U-19)

Out:

No.	Pos.	Nation	Player
2	DF	BRA	Vinícius (released)
4	DF	SVK	Ján Ďurica (loan return to Lokomotiv Moscow)
10	MF	NED	Arnold Bruggink (released)
14	MF	GER	Hanno Balitsch (to Bayer 04 Leverkusen)
16	GK	GER	Uwe Gospodarek (retired)
18	FW	CIV	Arouna Koné (loan return to Sevilla FC)
20	MF	POL	Jacek Krzynówek (retired)
24	FW	CZE	Jiří Štajner (to Slovan Liberec)
25	MF	BRA	Élson (loan return to VfB Stuttgart)
26	MF	GER	Jan Rosenthal (to SC Freiburg)
28	DF	GER	Leon Balogun (to SV Werder Bremen II)
30	GK	GER	Morten Jensen (released)
36	DF	GER	Hendrik Hahne (to SV Babelsberg 03)
37	MF	USA	Sal Zizzo (to Chivas USA)

=== 1. FC Nürnberg ===
In:

No.	Pos.	Nation	Player
2	MF	BEL	Timmy Simons (from PSV Eindhoven)
3	DF	SWE	Per Nilsson (from TSG 1899 Hoffenheim)
4	DF	GER	Jens Hegeler (on loan from Bayer 04 Leverkusen, previously on loan at FC Augsburg)
14	MF	SVK	Róbert Mak (from Manchester City Reserves)
15	MF	GER	Christoph Sauter (from FSV Mainz 05 U-19)
18	MF	ISR	Almog Cohen (from Maccabi Netanya)
21	MF	AUS	Dario Vidošić (loan return from MSV Duisburg)
23	FW	GER	Julian Schieber (on loan from VfB Stuttgart)
32	MF	AUT	Rubin Okotie (from Austria Wien)
33	DF	GER	Felicio Brown Forbes (from Hertha BSC U19)
37	MF	GER	Mehmet Ekici (on loan from FC Bayern Munich)

Out:

No.	Pos.	Nation	Player
2	DF	GER	Dennis Diekmeier (to Hamburger SV)
3	DF	BRA	Breno (loan return to FC Bayern Munich)
4	DF	NOR	Håvard Nordtveit (loan return to FC Arsenal)
7	MF	SUI	Daniel Gygax (to FC Luzern)
9	FW	GRE	Angelos Charisteas (to AC Arles-Avignon)
12	MF	GER	Marcel Risse (loan return to Bayer 04 Leverkusen)
14	FW	CMR	Eric Maxim Choupo-Moting (loan return to Hamburger SV)
15	MF	GER	Andreas Ottl (loan return to FC Bayern Munich)
21	MF	SEN	Mickaël Tavares (loan return to Hamburger SV)
26	MF	GER	Thomas Broich (to Brisbane Roar)
28	DF	GER	Dominik Reinhardt (to FC Augsburg, previously on loan)
36	MF	TUN	Jaouhar Mnari (to FSV Frankfurt)

=== 1. FC Kaiserslautern ===
In:

No.	Pos.	Nation	Player
2	DF	CZE	Jan Šimůnek (from VfL Wolfsburg)
3	DF	DEN	Leon Jessen (from FC Midtjylland)
7	MF	GER	Oliver Kirch (from Arminia Bielefeld)
8	MF	GER	Christian Tiffert (from MSV Duisburg)
10	FW	ALG	Chadli Amri (from 1. FSV Mainz 05)
11	FW	BUL	Iliyan Mitsanski (from Zagłębie Lubin)
13	DF	GRE	Athanasios Petsos (on loan from Bayer Leverkusen)
16	MF	CZE	Jan Morávek (on loan from FC Schalke 04)
20	DF	BRA	Rodnei (from Hertha BSC, previously on loan)
22	MF	CRO	Ivo Iličević (from VfL Bochum, previously on loan)
24	MF	AUT	Clemens Walch (from VfB Stuttgart)
38	MF	POL	Alan Stulin (from 1. FC Kaiserslautern II)
25	MF	CRO	Stiven Rivić (from FC Energie Cottbus)
33	FW	AUT	Erwin Hoffer (on loan form S.S.C. Napoli)
--	MF	POR	Ricky Pinheiro (loan return from VfL Osnabrück)
--	MF	GER	Anel Džaka (loan return from TuS Koblenz)

Out:

No.	Pos.	Nation	Player
8	MF	GER	Sidney Sam (loan return to Hamburger SV)
13	DF	GER	Mario Klinger (to Rot-Weiss Oberhausen)
14	DF	GER	Manuel Hornig (to TuS Koblenz)
15	MF	CMR	Georges Mandjeck (loan return to VfB Stuttgart)
18	DF	GER	Christoph Buchner (to 1. FC Saarbrücken)
24	MF	BIH	Dragan Paljić (to Wisła Kraków)
25	DF	SUI	Daniel Pavlovic (loan return to FC Schaffhausen)
26	FW	SVK	Erik Jendrišek (to FC Schalke 04)
30	DF	GER	Fabian Müller (to FC Erzgebirge Aue)
31	FW	TUR	Alper Akcam (to Gaziantepspor)
33	MF	GER	Markus Steinhöfer (loan return to Eintracht Frankfurt)

=== FC St. Pauli ===
In:

No.	Pos.	Nation	Player
5	DF	PER	Carlos Zambrano (on loan from FC Schalke 04)
13	FW	GER	Gerald Asamoah (from FC Schalke 04)
22	FW	GER	Fin Bartels (from F.C. Hansa Rostock)
26	GK	GER	Thomas Kessler (on loan from 1. FC Köln)
28	DF	GER	Moritz Volz (from Fulham F.C.)

Out:

No.	Pos.	Nation	Player
1	GK	GER	Patrik Borger (released)
3	DF	CMR	Marc Gouiffe à Goufan (released)
5	MF	CAN	Jonathan Beaulieu-Bourgault (to Preußen Münster)
10	MF	GER	Thomas Meggle (retired)
22	DF	GER	Andreas Biermann (released)
26	FW	FRA	Morike Sako (released)

== 2. Bundesliga ==
=== VfL Bochum ===
In:

No.	Pos.	Nation	Player
2	DF	GER	Björn Kopplin (from FC Bayern Munich II)
9	FW	PRK	Chong Tese (from Kawasaki Frontale)
11	FW	TUR	Mahir Sağlık (from VfL Wolfsburg, previously on loan at SC Paderborn 07)
14	MF	GER	Faton Toski (from Eintracht Frankfurt)
17	MF	GER	Oguzhan Kefkir (from VfL Bochum U-19)
18	MF	ITA	Giovanni Federico (from Arminia Bielefeld)
23	MF	GER	Marc Rzatkowski (from VfL Bochum II)
31	GK	GER	Michael Esser (from VfL Bochum II)
33	MF	GER	Philip Semlits (from VfL Bochum II)

Out:

No.	Pos.	Nation	Player
9	FW	SVK	Stanislav Sestak (on loan to Ankaragücü)
10	MF	CMR	Joël Epalle (to FK Baku)
14	FW	ARG	Diego Klimowicz (retired)
16	FW	IRI	Vahid Hashemian (released)
17	MF	GER	Lewis Holtby (loan return to FC Schalke 04)
27	DF	AUT	Christian Fuchs (on loan to 1. FSV Mainz 05)
30	GK	POR	Daniel Fernandes (on loan to Panathinaikos, previously on loan at Iraklis)
31	GK	GER	René Renno (to FC Energie Cottbus)
--	MF	CRO	Ivo Iličević (to 1. FC Kaiserslautern, previously on loan)

=== Hertha BSC ===
In:

No.	Pos.	Nation	Player
1	GK	NED	Maikel Aerts (from Willem II)
2	DF	GER	Christian Lell (from FC Bayern Munich)
4	DF	CZE	Roman Hubník (from FC Moscow, previously on loan)
5	DF	CRO	Andre Mijatović (from Arminia Bielefeld)
7	MF	AUT	Daniel Beichler (from Sturm Graz)
12	DF	BRA	Ronny (from Sporting CP, previously on loan at U.D. Leiria)
13	MF	AUS	Nikita Rukavytsya (from FC Twente, previously on loan at K.S.V. Roeselare)
14	DF	GER	Sebastian Neumann (from Hertha BSC U-19)
16	FW	CAN	Rob Friend (from Borussia Mönchengladbach)
18	MF	GER	Peter Niemeyer (on loan from Werder Bremen)
19	FW	GER	Pierre-Michel Lasogga (from Bayer 04 Leverkusen II)
22	DF	BRA	Kaká (loan return from AC Omonia)
30	MF	GER	Zecke Neuendorf (from FC Ingolstadt 04)
31	GK	GER	Marco Sejna (from FC Ingolstadt 04)

Out:

No.	Pos.	Nation	Player
1	GK	CZE	Jaroslav Drobný (to Hamburger SV)
3	DF	GER	Arne Friedrich (to VfL Wolfsburg)
4	DF	SUI	Steve von Bergen (to AC Cesena)
5	DF	SRB	Nemanja Pejčinović (loan return to FK Rad)
7	MF	BRA	Cicero (loan return to Tombense Futebol Clube)
11	MF	GER	Florian Kringe (loan return to Borussia Dortmund)
12	GK	GER	Timo Ochs (released)
13	DF	GER	Marc Stein (to FSV Frankfurt)
15	DF	BRA	Rodnei (to 1. FC Kaiserslautern, previously on loan)
17	FW	GRE	Theofanis Gekas (loan return to Bayer 04 Leverkusen)
18	FW	POL	Artur Wichniarek (to KKS Lech Poznań)
22	DF	SWE	Rasmus Bengtsson (to FC Twente)
25	MF	ROU	Maximilian Nicu (to SC Freiburg)
26	MF	POL	Łukasz Piszczek (to Borussia Dortmund)
30	GK	GER	Christopher Gäng (released)
44	MF	SRB	Gojko Kačar (to Hamburger SV)
--	MF	BRA	Lúcio (released, previously on loan at Grêmio Foot-Ball Porto Alegrense)
--	FW	TUN	Amine Chermiti (to FC Zürich, previously on loan at Al-Ittihad)

=== FC Augsburg ===
In:

No.	Pos.	Nation	Player
2	DF	NED	Paul Verhaegh (from Vitesse Arnhem)
3	DF	SLE	Gibril Sankoh (from FC Groningen)
4	DF	GER	Dominik Reinhardt (from 1. FC Nürnberg, previously on loan)
9	FW	GER	Torsten Oehrl (from SV Werder Bremen, previously on loan at Fortuna Düsseldorf)
11	FW	ANG	Nando Rafael (from AGF Aarhus, previously on loan)
17	DF	CAN	Marcel de Jong (from Roda JC)
29	MF	GER	Moritz Nebel (from FC Augsburg U-19)
30	GK	GER	Mohamed Amsif (from FC Schalke 04)
--	DF	GER	Benjamin Kern (loan return from Rot-Weiss Ahlen)
--	DF	GER	Lukas Sinkiewicz (from Bayer 04 Leverkusen)
--	MF	NED	Kees Kwakman (from NAC Breda)

Out:

No.	Pos.	Nation	Player
2	DF	GER	Jens Hegeler (loan return to Bayer 04 Leverkusen)
9	FW	HUN	Imre Szabics (to SK Sturm Graz)
7	FW	ALB	Edmond Kapllani (on loan to SC Paderborn, previously on loan at TuS Koblenz)
10	MF	BRA	Elton da Costa (to Kickers Offenbach)
14	FW	HUN	Sándor Torghelle (to Fortuna Düsseldorf)
17	DF	GER	Michael Schick (to SV Sandhausen)
18	DF	SLO	Goran Šukalo (to MSV Duisburg)
19	MF	GER	Stefan Buck (to 1860 Munich)
21	DF	GER	Roland Benschneider (to SV Sandhausen)
22	DF	MAR	Youssef El-Akchaoui (loan return to N.E.C.)
25	GK	GER	Lukas Kruse (to SC Paderborn)
28	FW	GER	Robert Strauß (to FC Erzgebirge Aue)
55	GK	BLR	Vasily Khomutovsky (released)

=== Fortuna Düsseldorf ===
In:

No.	Pos.	Nation	Player
5	DF	COD	Assani Lukimya-Mulongoti (from FC Carl Zeiss Jena)
8	MF	GER	Sascha Dum (from Bayer 04 Leverkusen, previously on loan at FC Energie Cottbus)
11	FW	GER	Maximilian Beister (on loan from Hamburger SV)
14	FW	HUN	Sándor Torghelle (from FC Augsburg)
16	FW	BRA	Wellington (on loan from TSG 1899 Hoffenheim)
18	FW	GER	Thomas Bröker (from Rot-Weiss Ahlen)
19	FW	GER	Marcel Gaus (from Fortuna Düsseldorf U19)
20	MF	BRA	Thiago Rockenbach (from Rot-Weiß Erfurt)
23	FW	GER	Marco Königs (from Fortuna Düsseldorf II)
31	DF	GER	Kai Schwertfeger (from Fortuna Düsseldorf II)
--	DF	BRA	Tiago (from MSV Duisburg)

Out:

No.	Pos.	Nation	Player
4	DF	CRO	Robert Palikuća (to TuS Bösinghoven)
11	MF	GER	Sebastian Heidinger (to Arminia Bielefeld)
13	FW	RUS	Dmitri Bulykin (loan return to RSC Anderlecht)
16	FW	GER	Torsten Oehrl (loan return to Werder Bremen)
20	DF	BRA	Bamba Anderson (loan return to Tombense Futebol Clube)
24	DF	GER	Fabian Hergesell (to Rot-Weiss Oberhausen)
25	FW	BEL	Axel Lawarée (to TuS Bösinghoven)
34	FW	AUT	Martin Harnik (loan return to Werder Bremen)

=== SC Paderborn ===
In:

No.	Pos.	Nation	Player
1	GK	GER	Lukas Kruse (from FC Augsburg)
9	FW	GER	David Jansen (from Chemnitzer FC)
16	MF	GER	Nico Klotz (from FC Erzgebirge Aue)
20	MF	GER	Adrian Jevrić (from SC Paderborn 07 II)
23	MF	LTU	Markus Palionis (from Dynamo Dresden)
--	DF	FIN	Jukka Raitala (on loan from 1899 Hoffenheim)
--	FW	ALB	Edmond Kapllani (on loan from FC Augsburg)
--	FW	MKD	Dragan Georgiev (on loan from 1. FSV Mainz 05)

Out:

No.	Pos.	Nation	Player
1	GK	DEN	Kasper Jensen (to FC Midtjylland)
2	MF	GER	Rudolf Zedi (to Rot-Weiß Erfurt)
3	DF	GER	Matthias Holst (to F.C. Hansa Rostock)
8	DF	GER	Sebastian Schachten (loan return to Borussia Mönchengladbach)
9	FW	GER	Frank Löning (to SV Sandhausen)
11	FW	TUR	Mahir Sağlık (loan return to VfL Wolfsburg)
13	MF	GER	Sebastian Schuppan (to Dynamo Dresden)
16	DF	GER	David Krecidlo (released)
20	GK	GER	Sebastian Lange (on loan to SC Wiedenbrück)
23	DF	GER	Sören Halfar (to Wacker Burghausen)
30	MF	GER	Tom Bertram (released)

=== MSV Duisburg ===
In:

No.	Pos.	Nation	Player
2	MF	GER	Julian Koch (on loan from Borussia Dortmund)
5	DF	GER	Daniel Reiche (from VfL Wolfsburg)
6	MF	GER	Benjamin Kern (from FC Augsburg, previously on loan at Rot Weiss Ahlen)
7	DF	GER	Michael Blum (from Karlsruher SC)
10	MF	CZE	Filip Trojan (on loan from 1. FSV Mainz 05)
15	MF	SLO	Goran Šukalo (from FC Augsburg)
18	GK	GER	David Yelldell (from TuS Koblenz)
19	FW	AUT	Stefan Maierhofer (on loan from Wolverhampton Wanderers)
21	DF	GER	André Hoffmann (from MSV Duisburg U-19)
22	FW	GER	Manuel Schäffler (on loan from TSV 1860 Munich)
25	MF	BIH	Branimir Bajić (from Denizlispor)
27	FW	GER	Maurice Exslager (from MSV Duisburg U-19)
29	MF	TUR	Burakcan Kunt (from MSV Duisburg U-19)
30	GK	GER	Marcel Lenz (from FC Schalke 04 U-19)
31	GK	GER	Roland Müller (from 1. FC Köln II)
32	MF	GER	Sefa Yilmaz (from VfL Wolfsburg II)
--	MF	BRA	Maicon (loan return from Figueirense Futebol Clube)

Out:

No.	Pos.	Nation	Player
1	GK	GER	Tom Starke (to TSG 1899 Hoffenheim)
2	DF	GER	Bernd Korzynietz (released)
3	DF	BRA	Tiago (to Fortuna Düsseldorf)
4	DF	GER	Björn Schlicke (to FSV Frankfurt)
7	MF	GER	Kevin Schindler (loan return to Werder Bremen)
10	MF	GER	Christian Tiffert (to 1. FC Kaiserslautern)
15	DF	GER	Frank Fahrenhorst (to FC Schalke 04 II)
19	FW	DEN	Søren Larsen (loan return to FC Toulouse)
21	FW	BRA	Caiuby (loan return to VfL Wolfsburg)
22	MF	GER	Alon Abelski (to Arminia Bielefeld)
23	FW	GER	Nicky Adler (to VfL Osnabrück)
25	DF	GER	Alexander Meyer (retired)
26	MF	AUS	Dario Vidosic (loan return to 1. FC Nürnberg)
29	DF	GER	Tobias Willi (retired)
31	GK	GER	Raphael Koczor (to Rot-Weiss Ahlen)
32	MF	GER	Änis Ben-Hatira (loan return to Hamburger SV)
34	MF	BEL	Kristoffer Andersen (to VfL Osnabrück)
--	MF	BRA	Maicon (to Figueirense Futebol Clube, previously on loan)

=== Arminia Bielefeld ===
In:

No.	Pos.	Nation	Player
20	MF	GER	Alon Abelski (from MSV Duisburg)
--	DF	GER	Benjamin Lense (from TuS Koblenz)
--	MF	TUR	Ensar Baykan (from Arminia Bielefeld U19)
--	MF	GER	Manuel Bölstler (from Rot-Weiss Erfurt)
--	MF	LBN	Ali Moslehe (from SV Wilhelmshaven)
--	MF	GER	Sebastian Heidinger (from Fortuna Düsseldorf)
--	FW	GER	Oliver Neuville (from Borussia Mönchengladbach)
--	FW	GER	Collin Quaner (from Fortuna Düsseldorf U-19)
--	FW	SUI	Orhan Mustafi (on loan from FC Basel)
--	DF	GER	Christ Kasela Mbona (from Borussia Mönchengladbach U-19)

Out:

No.	Pos.	Nation	Player
7	MF	DEN	Kasper Risgård (to Panonionos G.S.S.)
8	MF	ITA	Giovanni Federico (to VfL Bochum)
10	FW	ZAM	Christopher Katongo (to Skoda Xanthi)
11	FW	FIN	Berat Sadik (released, previously on loan at SV Zulte-Waregem)
13	MF	GER	Oliver Kirch (to 1. FC Kaiserslautern)
15	MF	BIH	Zlatko Janjić (to SV Wehen Wiesbaden)
16	DF	CRO	Andre Mijatović (to Hertha BSC)
24	MF	GER	Daniel Halfar (to TSV 1860 Munich)
28	FW	AUT	Dominik Rotter (released)
31	DF	CZE	Radim Kučera (to SK Sigma Olomouc)

=== TSV 1860 Munich ===
In:

No.	Pos.	Nation	Player
3	DF	GER	Stefan Bell (on loan from FSV Mainz)
4	MF	GER	Kai Bülow (from Hansa Rostock)
10	MF	GER	Savio Nsereko (on loan from AC Fiorentina)
16	MF	GER	Dominik Stahl (from TSV 1860 Munich II)
22	MF	NGR	Eke Uzoma (from SC Freiburg, previously on loan)
23	DF	GER	Benjamin Schwarz (loan return from SpVgg Unterhaching)
28	MF	GER	Daniel Halfar (from Arminia Bielefeld)
33	FW	USA	Kenny Cooper (loan return from Plymouth Argyle)
--	MF	GER	Stefan Buck (from FC Augsburg)
--	DF	PER	Juan Barros (on loan from Coronel Bolognesi)

Out:

No.	Pos.	Nation	Player
3	DF	BRA	Marcos Antonio (loan return to Sport Club Corinthians Alagoano)
4	DF	GER	Torben Hoffmann (to SpVgg Unterhaching)
5	DF	TUN	Radhouène Felhi (loan return to Etoile Sportive du Sahel)
9	FW	SRB	Đorđe Rakić (loan return to FC Red Bull Salzburg)
10	MF	GER	Sascha Rösler (released)
14	MF	GER	José Holebas (to Olympiacos)
25	GK	GER	Michael Hofmann (to SSV Jahn Regensburg)
26	FW	GER	Peniel Mlapa (to TSG 1899 Hoffenheim)
35	FW	GER	Mathias Fetsch (to Eintracht Braunschweig)

=== Karlsruher SC ===
In:

No.	Pos.	Nation	Player
13	MF	GER	Matthias Cuntz (from Karlsruher SC II)
28	DF	GER	Thomas Konrad (from Karlsruher SC II)
--	MF	GER	Stefan Rieß (from FC Bayern Munich II)
32	GK	USA	Luis Robles (from 1. FC Kaiserslautern)

Out:

No.	Pos.	Nation	Player
25	DF	GER	Michael Blum (to MSV Duisburg)
28	MF	GER	Lars Stindl (to Hannover 96)
31	GK	GER	Markus Miller (to Hannover 96)
33	DF	CRO	Dino Drpić (released)
37	DF	GER	Marvin Matip (loan return to 1. FC Köln)
--	MF	BRA	Antonio da Silva (to Borussia Dortmund, previously on loan at FC Basel)

=== FC Energie Cottbus ===
In:

No.	Pos.	Nation	Player
1	GK	GER	Thorsten Kirschbaum (from SV Sandhausen)
3	DF	GER	Kolja Afriyie (from FC Midtjylland)
7	MF	JPN	Takahito Soma (from C.S. Marítimo)
11	MF	AUT	Markus Obernosterer (on loan from FC Wacker Innsbruck)
21	DF	GER	Uwe Hünemeier (from Borussia Dortmund)
--	DF	BRA	Leo Bittencourt (from Energie Cottbus U-17)
--	GK	GER	René Renno (from VfL Bochum)
--	MF	GER	Daniel Adlung (from VfL Wolfsburg, previously on loan at Alemannia Aachen)
--	FW	POL	Przemyslaw Trytko (loan return from Arka Gdynia)
--	FW	GER	Maxim Banaskiewicz (from Energie Cottbus U-19)

Out:

No.	Pos.	Nation	Player
4	MF	BUL	Stanislav Angelov (released)
5	MF	GER	Sascha Dum (loan return to Bayer 04 Leverkusen)
10	MF	CRO	Stiven Rivić (to 1. FC Kaiserslautern)
11	FW	CMR	Leonard Kweuke (loan return to Dunajská Streda)
27	DF	ROU	Ovidiu Burcă (released)
30	GK	GER	Gerhard Tremmel (to FC Red Bull Salzburg)
34	GK	GER	Frank Lehmann (loan return to VfB Stuttgart)
36	DF	GER	Peter Hackenberg (to SV Wacker Burghausen)

=== SpVgg Greuther Fürth ===
In:

No.	Pos.	Nation	Player
19	DF	GER	Thomas Kleine (from Borussia Mönchengladbach)
20	FW	NGR	Kingsley Onuegbu (from Eintracht Braunschweig)
21	MF	GER	Marius Strangl (from SpVgg Greuther Fürth II)
28	FW	GER	Stefan Vogler (from Bahlinger SC)
29	FW	GER	Stefan Kolb (from FC Carl Zeiss Jena)
34	FW	GER	Tayfun Pektürk (from Eintracht Trier)
35	MF	GER	Philipp Langen (loan return from TuS Koblenz)

Out:

No.	Pos.	Nation	Player
1	GK	CIV	Stephan Loboué (to Rot-Weiß Oberhausen)
21	MF	IRI	Sebastian Ghasemi-Nobakht (to Rot Weiss Ahlen)
23	FW	GER	Marco Sailer (to SV Wehen Wiesbaden)
33	MF	GER	Marco Caligiuri (to 1. FSV Mainz 05)
31	FW	COD	Yannick Kakoko (to VfR Aalen)

=== 1. FC Union Berlin ===
In:

No.	Pos.	Nation	Player
2	FW	GER	Christopher Quiring (from Union Berlin U-19)
4	DF	ALG	Ahmed Reda Madouni (from Clermont Foot)
10	FW	NED	Santi Kolk (from Vitesse Arnhem)
13	GK	GER	Christoph Haker (from 1. FC Union Berlin II)
20	DF	GER	Jérôme Polenz (from Alemannia Aachen)
21	FW	GER	Halil Savran (from Dynamo Dresden)
26	DF	GER	Marcel Hegert (from 1. FC Union Berlin II)
28	DF	GER	Boné Uaferro (from 1. FC Union Berlin U-19)
40	GK	GER	Marcel Höttecke (from Borussia Dortmund)

Out:

No.	Pos.	Nation	Player
4	MF	GER	Marco Gebhardt (retired)
10	MF	GER	Hüzeyfe Dogan (released)
18	DF	GER	Daniel Schulz (to SV Sandhausen)
24	MF	GER	Michael Bemben (to Górnik Zabrze)
27	GK	GER	Carsten Busch (released)
28	FW	GER	Shergo Biran (to Dynamo Dresden)

=== Alemannia Aachen ===
In:

No.	Pos.	Nation	Player
5	DF	GER	Tobias Feisthammel (from VfB Stuttgart II)
7	MF	HUN	Zoltán Stieber (from TuS Koblenz)
8	MF	POL	Tomasz Zdebel (from Bayer 04 Leverkusen)
18	MF	TUR	Tolgay Arslan (on loan from Hamburger SV)
20	FW	EST	Henrik Ojamaa (from Derby County)
37	MF	GER	Marco Höger (from Alemannia Aachen II)
--	FW	GER	Juvhel Tsoumou (from Eintracht Frankfurt)

Out:

No.	Pos.	Nation	Player
5	DF	POL	Łukasz Szukała (released)
6	DF	GER	Jérôme Polenz (to 1. FC Union Berlin)
7	MF	GER	Reiner Plaßhenrich (retired)
8	FW	SVK	Szilárd Németh (released)
21	MF	GER	Cristian Fiél (released)
24	MF	GER	Daniel Adlung (loan return to VfL Wolfsburg)
26	MF	GER	Patrick Milchraum (released)
27	MF	GER	Faton Popova (released)
30	MF	AUT	Andreas Lasnik (to Willem II)

=== Rot-Weiß Oberhausen ===
In:

No.	Pos.	Nation	Player
1	GK	CIV	Stephan Loboué (from SpVgg Greuther Fürth)
2	DF	GER	Mario Klinger (from 1. FC Kaiserslautern)
7	MF	GER	Emmanuel Krontiris (from TuS Koblenz)
11	FW	NGR	Moses Lamidi (from Borussia Mönchengladbach)
14	MF	GER	Fabian Hergesell (from Fortuna Düsseldorf)
--	DF	GER	Kevin Corvers (from VfB Speldorf)

Out:

No.	Pos.	Nation	Player
2	DF	GAM	Timo Uster (retired)
7	FW	GER	Moritz Stoppelkamp (to Hannover 96)
19	FW	GER	Markus Heppke (to Wuppertaler SV Borussia)

=== FSV Frankfurt ===
In:

No.	Pos.	Nation	Player
3	DF	GER	Björn Schlicke (from MSV Duisburg)
4	DF	GER	Kai-Fabian Schulz (on loan from Hamburger SV)
5	DF	GER	Manuel Konrad (from SpVgg Unterhaching)
7	MF	TUN	Jawhar Mnari (from 1. FC Nürnberg)
8	MF	GER	Mike Wunderlich (from Rot-Weiss Essen)
11	MF	GER	Mario Fillinger (from Hansa Rostock)
16	DF	GER	Marc Heitmeier (from Kickers Offenbach)
18	DF	SWE	Andreas Dahlén (from F.C. Hansa Rostock)
20	FW	SEN	Momar N'Diaye (from Rot-Weiss Ahlen)
22	MF	GER	Samil Cinaz (from Rot-Weiß Erfurt)
23	FW	GER	Sven Müller (from FC Erzgebirge Aue)
25	GK	AUT	Michael Langer (from SC Freiburg)
--	MF	TUR	Tufan Tosunoğlu (from 1. FSV Mainz 05)
--	DF	GER	Marc Stein (from Hertha BSC)

Out:

No.	Pos.	Nation	Player
3	DF	GER	Alexander Klitzpera (to VfL Wolfsburg II)
4	DF	GER	Markus Husterer (to Kickers Offenbach)
5	DF	ESP	Kirian (released)
7	MF	CAN	Nikolas Ledgerwood (to SV Wehen Wiesbaden)
8	MF	BIH	Sead Mehić (to Kickers Offenbach)
11	FW	PER	Junior Ross (loan return to Coronel Bolognesi)
13	DF	GER	Alexander Voigt (to FC Carl Zeiss Jena)
15	FW	MLI	Bakary Diakité (released)
20	GK	GER	Daniel Ischdonat (to SV Sandhausen)
21	DF	CRO	Dajan Šimac (released)
23	MF	GAM	Pa Saikou Kujabi (released)
25	MF	FIN	Pekka Lagerblom (to VfB Stuttgart II)
26	MF	MAR	Oualid Mokhtari (released)
35	MF	ROU	Vlad Munteanu (loan return to VfL Wolfsburg)
39	FW	MNE	Sanibal Orahovac (released)

=== VfL Osnabrück ===
In:

No.	Pos.	Nation	Player
5	DF	GER	Benjamin Gorka (from Wacker Burghausen)
6	MF	GER	Alexander Krük (from Eintracht Frankfurt, previously on loan)
9	FW	SEN	Mamadou Diabang (from FK Austria Wien)
16	DF	GER	Robin Twyrdy (from VfL Osnabrück U-19)
17	FW	GER	Christian Pauli (from VfL Osnabrück U-19)
18	MF	POL	Sebastian Tyrała (from Borussia Dortmund)
21	MF	GER	Nicky Adler (from MSV Duisburg)
26	MF	GER	Daniel Latkowski (from VfL Osnabrück U-19)
33	GK	GER	Manuel Riemann (from Wacker Burghausen)
34	MF	BEL	Kristoffer Andersen (from MSV Duisburg)

Out:

No.	Pos.	Nation	Player
2	DF	GER	Patrick Herrmann (released)
5	DF	TUR	Abdullah Keseroglu (to Ankaraspor A.Ş.)
20	MF	GER	Henning Grieneisen (released)
42	MF	POR	Ricky Pinheiro (loan return to 1. FC Kaiserslautern)

=== FC Erzgebirge Aue ===
In:

No.	Pos.	Nation	Player
--	DF	GER	Tobias Kempe (from SV Werder Bremen II)
--	DF	TUN	Adli Lachheb (from Hallescher FC)
--	DF	GER	Fabian Müller (from 1. FC Kaiserslautern)
--	MF	GER	Oliver Schröder (from F.C. Hansa Rostock)
--	MF	GER	Kevin Schlitte (from F.C. Hansa Rostock)
--	FW	GER	Enrico Kern (from F.C. Hansa Rostock)
--	FW	GER	Robert Strauß (from FC Augsburg)

Out:

No.	Pos.	Nation	Player
13	FW	GER	Sven Müller (to FSV Frankfurt)
16	MF	GER	Nico Klotz (to SC Paderborn)
20	FW	GHA	Eric Agyemang (released)

=== FC Ingolstadt 04 ===
In:

No.	Pos.	Nation	Player
--	FW	HUN	Márkó Futács (on loan from Werder Bremen)
--	GK	GER	Sascha Kirschstein (from Rot Weiss Ahlen)
--	MF	GER	Manuel Hartmann (from TuS Koblenz)
--	FW	USA	Amaechi Igwe (from New England Revolution)
--	FW	GER	Sebastian Hofmann (from VfB Stuttgart II)
--	FW	GER	Sebastian Zielinsky (from 1. FC Köln)
--	DF	AUT	Ronald Gercaliu (from SC Magna Wiener Neustadt)
--	DF	GER	Andreas Görlitz (from FC Bayern Munich)
--	DF	GER	Marvin Matip (from 1. FC Köln, previously on loan at Karlsruher SC)

Out:

No.	Pos.	Nation	Player
7	FW	GER	Ersin Demir (to FC Ingolstadt 04 II)
11	MF	GER	Zecke Neuendorf (to Hertha BSC)
21	GK	GER	Marco Sejna (to Hertha BSC)
26	MF	GER	Alexander Buch (to Jahn Regensburg)
30	FW	NED	Robert Braber (to RKC Waalwijk)

== See also ==
- 2010–11 Bundesliga
- 2010–11 2. Bundesliga
