= List of Secrets episodes =

Secrets (Saladused) is an Estonian television drama series created by Tuuli Roosma. Each story is made by different producer, such as Anri Rulkov, Arbo Tammiksaar, Rando Pettai, Marianne Kõrver, Ergo Kuld, Jan-Erik Nõgisto, Rain Tolk.

The show Tuuli Roosma presented covered the Estonian people's relationship dramas and scandals.

Its premiere was on Kanal 2 on 31 March 2008.

== Episodes ==
=== Series 1 (2008) ===
No.	Title	Directed by	Written by	Original release date
1	"Onto the Muse & Domestic violence"	Arbo Tammiksaar & Rando Pettai	Aidi Vallik	31 March 2008
New TV series startin on Kanal2, presented by Tuuli Roosma
2	"Genetically suitable Dad & Everybody are gays"	Arbo Tammiksaar & Anri Rulkov	Aidi Vallik	7 April 2008
Today's show will reach us in two wildly sounding, but still the reality in Estonia direct from a true story. We see what happened in the family, where the woman's husband discover that he is actually gay. And the thing would not be that crazy, if another strange circumstance occurred ... See more on show. Another story tells us country side family, where family is having difficulties with getting child. Children are, however, surely, a great gift and a gift arrived in amazing ways. Estonian life stories directly from this true story.

=== Series 2 (2008) ===
No. overall	No. in series	Title	Directed by	Written by	Original release date
10	1	"A man falls in love with mother-in-law & Romeo & Julia"	Arbo Tammiksaar	Aidi Vallik	8 September 2008
It is said that mother for someone and daughter to other one. But what to do if one day you discover that your husband loves your mother also besides you? Seems unbelievable? But on this subject is we have received most of the letters. Today, we tell one of them – Jana's story. Do not know what felt and feels Jana's mother, watch and decide! Also, we will bring you the story, where super regardful dad tries to control his teenage daughter's love relationships. You can see what can come out there.
11	2	"Careless mother & A pioneer mother"	Arbo Tammiksaar & Ergo Kuld	Aidi Vallik	15 September 2008
What makes a young woman to abandon her own child? Is it really more important to get the contribution from men than taking care of your baby at home? You can see the secret of Raivo, who took parental rights from his leader wife. Today's second story is told as a young pioneer whose life got destroyed by boys. Or did it? Middle-aged woman looks back from now to this story which took place many years ago.
12	3	"Matchmaker & AA opened eyes"	Ergo Kuld & Arbo Tammiksaar	Aidi Vallik	22 September 2008
The show Secrets brings humorous story from the last century to viewers, where one of the women's husband managed to cuddle all his village girls. Main actors of funny and gripping story are singer Mikk Saar, rapper G-Enka and musician Jaan Pehk. It is that life is full of unexpected and confirms our second story today. You will see what happened wit woman, who sent her husband to anonym alcoholics.
13	4	"Night with stranger & Obsess sexuality"	Marianne Kõrver & Arbo Tammiksaar	Aidi Vallik	29 September 2008
Today's first story might happen to anyone of us. We bring you the Kadri and Mihkel's secrets. The story, which made them both, but especially Mihkel's, very seriously to think about their lives. Our second story is probably the most amazing, that is ever made on Secrets. Let's talk about a man who was obsessed by sexuality and he decided to get rid of it. Methods and tools, he uses are very unusual.
14	5	"Sex for money & Sand castle"	Marianne Kõrver & Ergo Kuld	Aidi Vallik	6 October 2008
Have you ever had sex for money? Ave is, hoping that no one can ever know about it. Unfortunately, past sins usually shows themselves again. You will see another true-life story, what will happen a young boy who starts a relationship with a much older boss. And what happens when boss gets bored of her toy.
15	6	"Lolita & Revelation"	Arbo Tammiksaar	Aidi Vallik & Marko Lillemägi	13 October 2008
Today's show will bring you a secret, where characters are 13-year old bride and 49-years old groom. It is a bizarre story, where the limits between friendship, love and pedophile are very blurred. In addition, we look at what happened to a young woman whose husband turned to religion over and mess up all their family life.
16	7	"Bride of the bum chief & Ghost"	Ergi Kuld & Arbo Tammiksaar	Aidi Vallik	20 October 2008
Many women prefer 'bad boys' instead of the decent and caring men. Relation with mysterious and julge man can be exciting, but it also can have quite an unexpected ending. You will see story of the bum crew operating in Tallinn, which takes advantage of young women in love. Our second story can appoint as a horror story. How big role plays fear from the perceptiont of this ghost story, let each viewer to decide.
17	8	"Father's house & Poop Poop"	Arbo Tammiksaar	Aidi Vallik	27 October 2008
Today's show is thought-provoking story of a young spirit from greed. To get inheritance they are ready to terrorize their own parents. Other story is cheerful. We see an incredibly funny secret about oblivious girl, who was without a groom.
18	9	"Headmaster & Miracle kid"	Ergo Kuld & Arbo Tammiksaar	Marko Lillemägi	3 November 2008
Today's secret is ethically highly questionable. It tells us about one Tallinn headmaster, who likes young girls. He does not hesitate to create relationships with school pupils and manipulation with them by putting girls educational success depend of the headmaster. Today's another story talks about parents, who lives on their own unfulfilled dreams out of their children.
19	10	"Senior lady keeps eye on son's friend & Own court"	Ergo Kuld & Arbo Tammiksaar	Aidi Vallik & Marko Lillemägi	10 November 2008
Do own court is the solution? Today's serial we recover seven years ago case, which had influence to all Estonia. Villagers paid back to bums crew for years terrorizing all village. Understanding pay back, villagers crossed the line. You will also see embarrassingly funny story about a senior age lady, who loves to joke, drink, and young boys. In particular, she likes her son's best friend.
20	11	"Unemployed & Grandmother"	Marianne Kõrver & Arbo Tammiksaar	Aidi Vallik & Arbo Tammiksaar	17 November 2008
Pregnant Liina worked on many fronts – she studied and took care of the household. At the same time her husband looked for a job by lying on the couch. Finally found. It appears that Liinas's husband is full of secrets. What did a man actually, when wife sent him to work every morning with a kiss? Other story is grandmother's confession, that she is no longer needed to anybody.
21	12	"Alimony & Violation of child"	Ergo Kuld	Marko Lillemägi & Aidi Vallik	24 November 2008
Today's series central theme is sneaky love. We bring you the many small girls big and terrible secret – how to live at home, where father harassed, but you can not talk to the mother about it? You'll also see a story about a girl, who want to keep rich man for herself with common child. Things are not going as she wanted and now she needs to pay for it. How? See the show!

=== Series 3 (2009) ===
No. overall	No. in series	Title	Directed by	Written by	Original release date
22	1	"Sex with boss & Parents' divorce"	Ergo Kuld & Arbo Tammiksaar	Marko Lillemägi & Aidi Vallik	14 September 2009
A young girl's life changes forever when her parents inform her that they are divorcing. The resulting situation adds fuel to the flames father's new pregnant woman. All family members lives are instantly scrambled. Whether and how they will come out of it? Today's other story you will see what happens in a small company, while new employee gets too close to the boss.
23	2	"Relationship disdurber & Youth party"	Ergo Kuld	Marko Lillemägi & Aidi Vallik	21 September 2009
Forcing for sex has already become a problem in Estonia. We will show you the story of one young party, where excessive alcohol consumption leads to irreversible consequences. The sad fact is that today shown story is one of the most frequently sent secret. We directed Kati's story, which should be a warning to all parting young people, who might want their first experience be positive. We will also show one of the sillier the story of conservative-minded mommies-daddies, who interrupt their son's relationship and made girl going crazy.
24	3	"Redundancy & Blinkers"	Arbo Tammiksaar & Kristjan Sarv	Aidi Vallik & Marko Lillemägi	28 September 2009
"Secrets" gives blazing look to love relationship between an alcoholic and drug addict. It turns out that young people are not addicted to substance abuse but also from each other. Isn't three addiction too strong a mixture for one relationship? Let's take a look into one pregnant young woman's life, who has to take responsibility of thoughtless one night stand. Did her deception becomes apparent maternity hospital? Can woman be able to live with so big lie by allowing her husband to raise another man's child?
25	4	"First robbery & Psychological terror"	Ergo Kuld & Arbo Tammiksaar	Aidi Vallik	5 October 2009
Secrets action-costume-drama in the early 90s! Russian troops left Estonia, and there was just a wolf in the laws of the time where every thief wanted scrape together as much treasure as possible. The show brings the story to audience which has been hidden for 16 years for now. Middle of criminal events are two schoolgirls. Which is worse – whether physical violence or mental terror? You'll see what happens to people who are forced to live under the mental terror.
26	5	"False love letters & Crazy fight with a weight"	Arbo Tammiksaar & Marianne Kõrver	Aidi Vallik	12 October 2009
School's most popular girl asks one nerd girl to be correspondence with boy. Young people fall in love. Unfortunately, it exists only on paper, a young man's feelings and statements are meant to be for someone much more beautiful. Do men really prefer someone relative cold soul, harsh and beautiful? The fact that outer beauty is more important than inner, is proved by another story. We will see a teenage girl's confession, which believes that she is too thick. In very good fit girl decides to lose some weight, but a little diet turns to scary weight loss.
27	6	"Dirty release & Bind dating"	Arbo Tammiksaar & Kristjan Sarv	Aidi Vallik & Marko Lillemägi	19 October 2009
Today's show will see story which has touched many of us lately – losing a job. Small-town resident Milvi starts her new job with big hope, but soon it becomes clear that the post is created only in order to take advantage of good working people and then fired them. Finally Milvi do not have other option than to start a fight for self-aggregation. In addition, you'll see an incredible story of a man and a woman who dive into secret relationship for new experiences.
28	7	"Soap operas relative bundle & Instructor"	Ergo Kuld & Kristjan Sarv	Marko Lillemägi	26 October 2009
If woman drives a car, she will crash it. Maybe it is an instructor fault? Today's first story takes us to the car school, where we meet unpleasant teachers who makes practical lessons impossible. In addition, takes place in our "Passions storm", as a young girl discovers that she have fallen by chance into relationship as in soap opera.
29	8	"Lost love & Duty assignment"	Ergo Kuld & Arbo Tammiksaar	Marko Lillemägi	2 November 2009
Today we will present stories from two guys. First of all, you will see a young man's confession, where he will move from town to big city, he gets to live in dormitory and he will lose focus from right things. His new life is full of parties and relationships. In one relationship he loses his heart and in the end even more. Another story tells about father who takes new job away from home because of financial reasons. Going away changes his family life forever. Although a loving father is ready to give up everything, it is almost impossible to patch broken family. Is the man manages to save his family?
30	9	"Suicide & Talks with embryo"	Ergo Kuld & Tuuli Roosma	Aidi Vallik	9 November 2009
Giving life and taking life. You can see the Secrets' strangest story, where a woman tried for years unsuccessfully to have children, but eventually she found support from the most incredible place – from her unborn baby. If some people are worried not to have kids, then some kids want to be unborned. The story about suicide teen, for whom suicide seems to be only sensible act of her nonsense life.
31	10	"Clueless Son & If father drank"	Arbo Tammiksaar	Aidi Vallik & Marko Lillemägi	16 November 2009
Mom treats her only son as a small kid and burke him with excessive care. Where such a type of behavior leads to? Did the boy will always be mother's boy? Our second story takes us to the countryside. You can see the family, whose welfare depends on father's drinking. Not only that young family members must act like adults and do all necessary work, they must also take care of their father.
32	11	"Dance around the money boiler & Egyptian trip"	Marianne Kõrver & Ergo Kuld	Aidi Vallik	23 November 2009
Property division after divorce becomes a real nightmare. Is money really more important than the three children and eighteen years of cohabitation? In another story, you see a successful businesswoman to whom working at home alone pays back. Instead of making the work, she spends more and more time at the bar cabinet.
33	12	"Casino Dealer & Casino addiction"	Ergo Kuld	Aidi Vallik	30 November 2009
Season last show we will get into the game hell. Let us look at game addiction life where hope to win carries him into bigger loans lies. But it turns out that the victims of the casino is not only ones who are plagued of passion of the game. Let's look to the other side of the playground, where girl works as a casino dealer, appears that the casino workers' lives is similar to lives of prostitutes.

=== Series 4 (2010) ===
No. overall	No. in series	Title	Directed by	Written by	Original release date
34	1	"Why you don't leave me alone? & Lesbian scandal"	Ergo Kuld & Arbo Tammiksaar	Aidi Vallik	6 September 2010
35	2	"Friends & Money & Honest man and cheat woman"	Arbo Tammiksaar & Marianne Kõrver	Aidi Vallik	13 September 2010
36	3	"Bulimia & Missing grandchild"	Ergo Kuld	Aidi Vallik	20 September 2010
37	4	"Young mistress? & Jeallousy above the grave"	Arbo Tammiksaar & Ergo Kuld	Aidi Vallik	27 September 2010
38	5	"Rich brother, poor brother & Esoteric"	Marianne Kõrver & Arbo Tammiksaar	Aidi Vallik	4 October 2010
39	6	"Bottle of vodka & Between two homes"	Arbo Tammiksaar & Ergo Kuld	Aidi Vallik	11 October 2010
40	7	"Greedy Mirjam & Cheeky"	& Ragne Mandri	Aidi Vallik	18 October 2010
41	8	"Bottle of vodka & Between two homes"	Arbo Tammiksaar & Ergo Kuld	Aidi Vallik	25 October 2010
42	9	"Braggart & New, caring man"	Arbo Tammiksaar & Marianne Kõrver	Aidi Vallik	1 November 2010
43	10	"Kid hater & Life with mother-in-law"	Ragne Mandri & Arbo Tammiksaar	Aidi Vallik	8 November 2010
44	11	"Family stuff & Stepmothers"	Ergo Kuld & Arbo Tammiksaar	Aidi Vallik	15 November 2010
45	12	"Woman's worry about sex & Men eater"	Marianne Kõrver & Arbo Tammiksaar	Aidi Vallik	22 November 2010
46	13	"Internet sweetheart & Life with alcoholics mother"	Ragne Mandri & Marianne Kõrver	Aidi Vallik	29 November 2010
