= Korver =

Korver and de Korver are Dutch occupational surnames derived from the ocupation "basket maker".

The surname Körver is buth a Dutch and a German surname and may be Americanized to "Korver".

Kõrver is an Estonian surname.

Notable people with the surnames include:

== Korver ==
- Boris Kõrver (1917–1994), Estonian composer
- Cher Korver, Dutch wheelchair basketball player
- Frans Körver (1937–2024), Dutch footballer
- Kelvin Korver (born 1949), American football player
- Kristjan Kõrver (born 1976), Estonian composer
- Kyle Korver (born 1981), American basketball player
- Larry Korver (born 1936), American football coach
- Marianne Kõrver, Estonian film director
- Paul Korver (born 1971), American filmmaker
- Simon Korver (1940–2009), Dutch sailor

== de Korver ==
- André de Korver, Dutch cyclist
- Bok de Korver (1883–1957), Dutch footballer
- Kees de Korver, Dutch rower

== See also ==
- Körvers
- Corver
