= Measure of a Man =

Measure of a Man may refer to:

== Film and television ==
- The Measure of a Man (1915 film), an American lost silent drama film directed by Joe De Grasse and featuring Lon Chaney
- The Measure of a Man (1916 film), an American silent drama film directed by Jack Conway
- The Measure of a Man (1924 film), an American silent drama film directed by Arthur Rosson
- The Measure of a Man (2015 film), a French film directed by Stéphane Brizé
- Measure of a Man (film), a 2018 American film
- "The Measure of a Man" (Doctors), a 2003 television episode
- "The Measure of a Man" (Star Trek: The Next Generation), a 1989 television episode

== Literature ==
- The Measure of a Man: A Spiritual Autobiography, a 2000 book by Sidney Poitier
- The Measure of a Man, a 1959 book by Martin Luther King Jr.

== Music ==
- Measure of a Man (Clay Aiken album) or the title song, 2003
- Measure of a Man (Kevin Sharp album) or the title song, 1996
- "Measure of a Man" (Jack Ingram song), 2007
- "Measure of a Man" (Sam and Mark song), 2003
- "Measure of a Man", a song by FKA Twigs, 2021
- "The Measure of a Man", a song by Elton John from the soundtrack of the film Rocky V, 1990

== See also ==
- Measure of Man a 2006 Singaporean Mandarin-language TV series
- The Measure of Man, a 2011 Estonian English-language documentary film
- The Mismeasure of Man, a 1981 book by Stephen Jay Gould
