= Corvers =

Corvers is a surname. Notable people with the surname include:

- Frank Corvers (born 1969), Belgian cyclist
- Kevin Corvers (born 1987), German footballer

== See also ==
- Corver
