= Corver =

Corver is a Dutch surname, a spelling variant of Korver. Notable people with the surname include:

- Charles Corver (1936–2020), Dutch football referee
- Jan Corver (1878–1956), Dutch radio and broadcasting pioneer and journalist
- Joan Corver (1628–1716), Dutch merchant and mayor of Amsterdam
- Han Corver (1905-2002), Dutch politician and civil servant

== See also ==
- Corvers
