= Saladused =

Estonian television series

- Also known as: Secrets
- Genre: Drama
- Created by: Tuuli Roosma
- Directed by: Anri Rulkov; Arbo Tammiksaar; Rando Pettai; Marianne Kõrver; Ergo Kuld; Jan-Erik Nõgisto; Rain Tolk
- Country of origin: Estonian
- Original language: Estonian
- No. of seasons: 4
- No. of episodes: 46 (list of episodes)

Original release
- Network: Kanal 2
- Release: 31 March 2008 – present

Secrets (Estonian: Saladused) is an Estonian television drama series created by Tuuli Roosma. Each story is made by different directors, such as Anri Rulkov, Arbo Tammiksaar, Rando Pettai, Marianne Kõrver, Ergo Kuld, Jan-Erik Nõgisto, Rain Tolk.

Show recovers the Estonian people relationship dramas and scandals.

Tuuli Roosma's presented series brings out the big mysteries of ordinary people in Estonia, and a staggering relationship dramas in sillier adventures. It is exclusively true-life stories with real people behind. Their privacy interests TV series uses real actors and actresses for big screen production.

Its premiere was on Kanal 2 on 31 March 2008.

== See also ==
- List of Secrets episodes
