= Timo Uster =

Gambian footballer

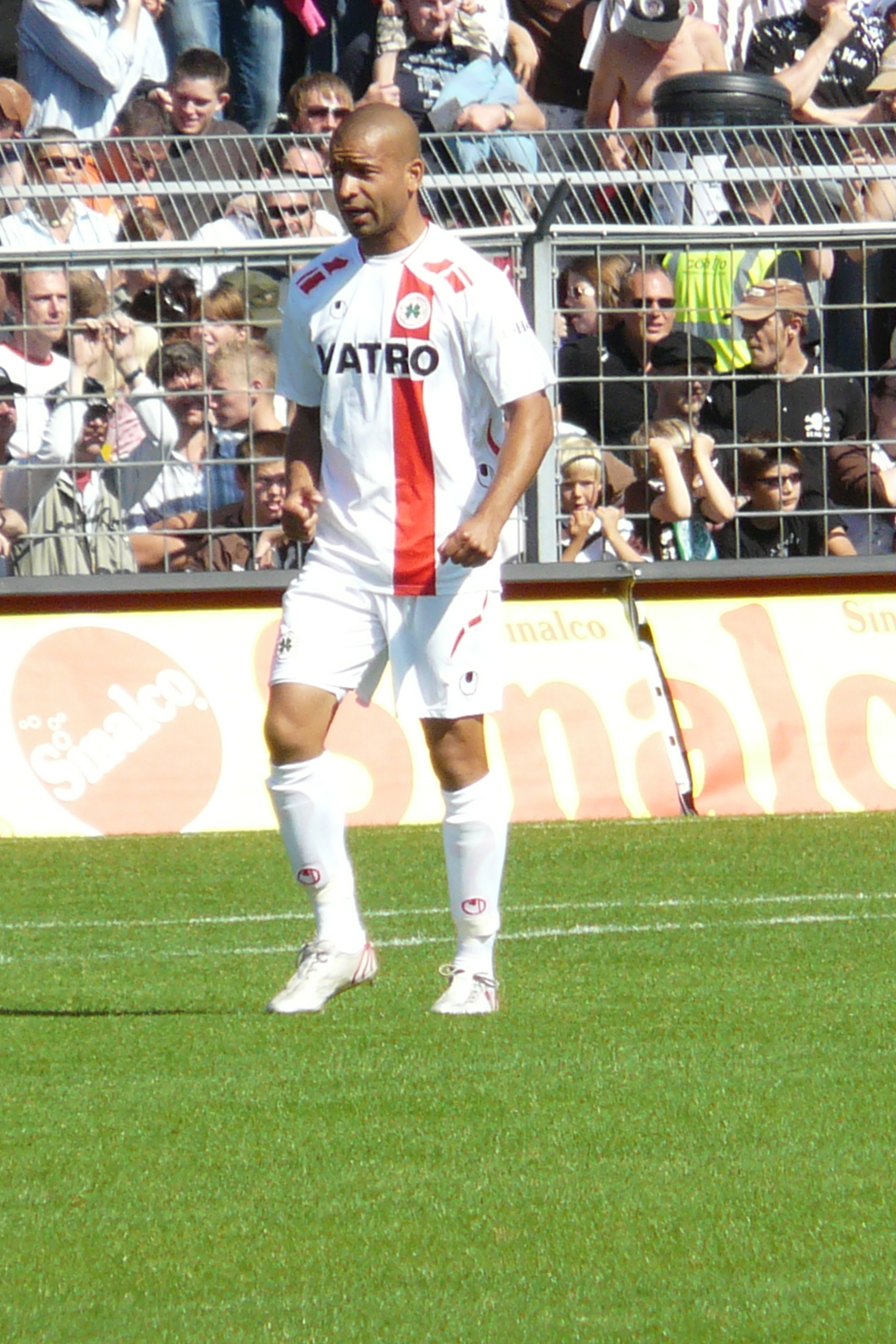
- Timo Uster (2008)

Personal information
- Full name: Timo Uster
- Date of birth: 22 October 1974 (age 52)
- Place of birth: Berlin, Germany
- Height: 1.83 m (6 ft 0 in)
- Position: Defender

Youth career
- 1989–1992: Blau-Weiß Berlin

Senior career*
Years	Team	Apps	(Gls)
1992–1993	Reinickendorfer Füchse		
1993–1994	Frohnauer SC		
1994–1997	SCC Berlin		
1997	FSV Velten		
1998	SV Tasmania 73 Neukölln	13	(2)
1998–2000	SV Meppen		
2000–2002	FC Carl Zeiss Jena	33	(1)
2002–2003	SV Wehen Wiesbaden	38	(3)
2003–2005	SV Darmstadt 98	21	(1)
2005–2010	Rot-Weiß Oberhausen	40	(0)

International career
2007	Gambia	2	(0)
- * Club domestic league appearances and goals as of 18:18, 1 August 2010 (UTC)

Timo Uster (born 22 October 1974 in Berlin) is a Gambian footballer who last played for Rot-Weiß Oberhausen.

== International career ==
Uster played two caps for the Gambian national football team in 2007.

== Personal life ==
He also holds German citizenship.
