= Kai-Fabian Schulz =

German footballer

Personal information
- Full name: Kai-Fabian Schulz
- Date of birth: 12 March 1990 (age 36)
- Place of birth: Neumünster, West Germany
- Height: 1.90 m (6 ft 3 in)
- Position: Defender

Team information
- Current team: SV Todesfelde
- Number: 5

Youth career
- TuS Garbek
- TSV Bornhöved
- –2003: FC St. Pauli
- 2003–2009: Hamburger SV

Senior career*
Years	Team	Apps	(Gls)
2008–2010	Hamburger SV II	47	(2)
2009–2011	Hamburger SV	0	(0)
2010–2011	→ FSV Frankfurt (loan)	2	(0)
2010–2011	→ FSV Frankfurt II (loan)	20	(1)
2011–2012	FC Carl Zeiss Jena	31	(0)
2012–2013	SV Babelsberg 03	2	(0)
2013–2015	Goslarer SC 08	63	(6)
2015–2016	FC Schönberg 95	17	(0)
2016–	SV Todesfelde	96	(7)

International career
2009	Germany U-20	3	(0)
- * Club domestic league appearances and goals as of 15 February 2021

Kai-Fabian Schulz (born 12 March 1990 in Neumünster) is a German footballer who plays for SV Todesfelde in the Oberliga Schleswig-Holstein.

Schulz appeared for the German team at the 2009 FIFA U-20 World Cup.
