= Alon Abelski =

German footballer (born 1989)

Personal information
- Full name: Alon Alexander Abelski
- Date of birth: 29 May 1989 (age 37)
- Place of birth: Düsseldorf, West Germany
- Height: 1.72 m (5 ft 8 in)
- Position: Midfielder

Team information
- Current team: Sportfreunde Baumberg
- Number: 14

Youth career
- 1996–2007: Fortuna Düsseldorf
- 2007–2008: MSV Duisburg

Senior career*
Years	Team	Apps	(Gls)
2008–2010	MSV Duisburg II	49	(9)
2010	MSV Duisburg	4	(0)
2010–2011	Arminia Bielefeld	15	(0)
2011–2014	Eintracht Trier	88	(14)
2014–2015	SpVgg Unterhaching	32	(4)
2015–2016	Rather SV	24	(19)
2016–2017	MSV Düsseldorf	29	(31)
2017–2018	DJK Sparta Bilk	26	(32)
2018–	Sportfreunde Baumberg	54	(9)
- * Club domestic league appearances and goals as of 14 January 2021

Alon Alexander Abelski (born 29 May 1989) is a German footballer who plays as a midfielder for Sportfreunde Baumberg.

== Career ==
Abelski made his full debut on 17 January 2010 in a 2. Bundesliga match against FSV Frankfurt.

After being released by Arminia Bielefeld in 2011, Abelski joined Hapoel Tel Aviv on trial. Abelski holds Israel citizenship.

He played for Team Germany in Israel at the 2017 Maccabiah Games.
