= Sebastian Zielinsky =

German footballer

Personal information
- Date of birth: 21 February 1988 (age 38)
- Place of birth: Cologne, West Germany
- Height: 1.83 m (6 ft 0 in)
- Positions: Midfielder; forward

Youth career
- –1995: Fortuna Köln
- 1995–2007: 1. FC Köln

Senior career*
Years	Team	Apps	(Gls)
2007–2009	1. FC Köln II	49	(3)
2009–2010	1. FC Köln	2	(0)
2010–2011	FC Ingolstadt 04	11	(0)
2012	Wacker Burghausen	10	(1)
2012–2013	SV Darmstadt 98	33	(0)
2014–2015	Lokomotive Leipzig	40	(0)
2016	1. FC Köln II	8	(0)
2016	TPSK 1925 Köln	7	(2)
Total		160	(6)
- * Club domestic league appearances and goals

Sebastian Zielinsky (born 21 February 1988) is a German retired footballer.
