= Marco Sejna =

German footballer

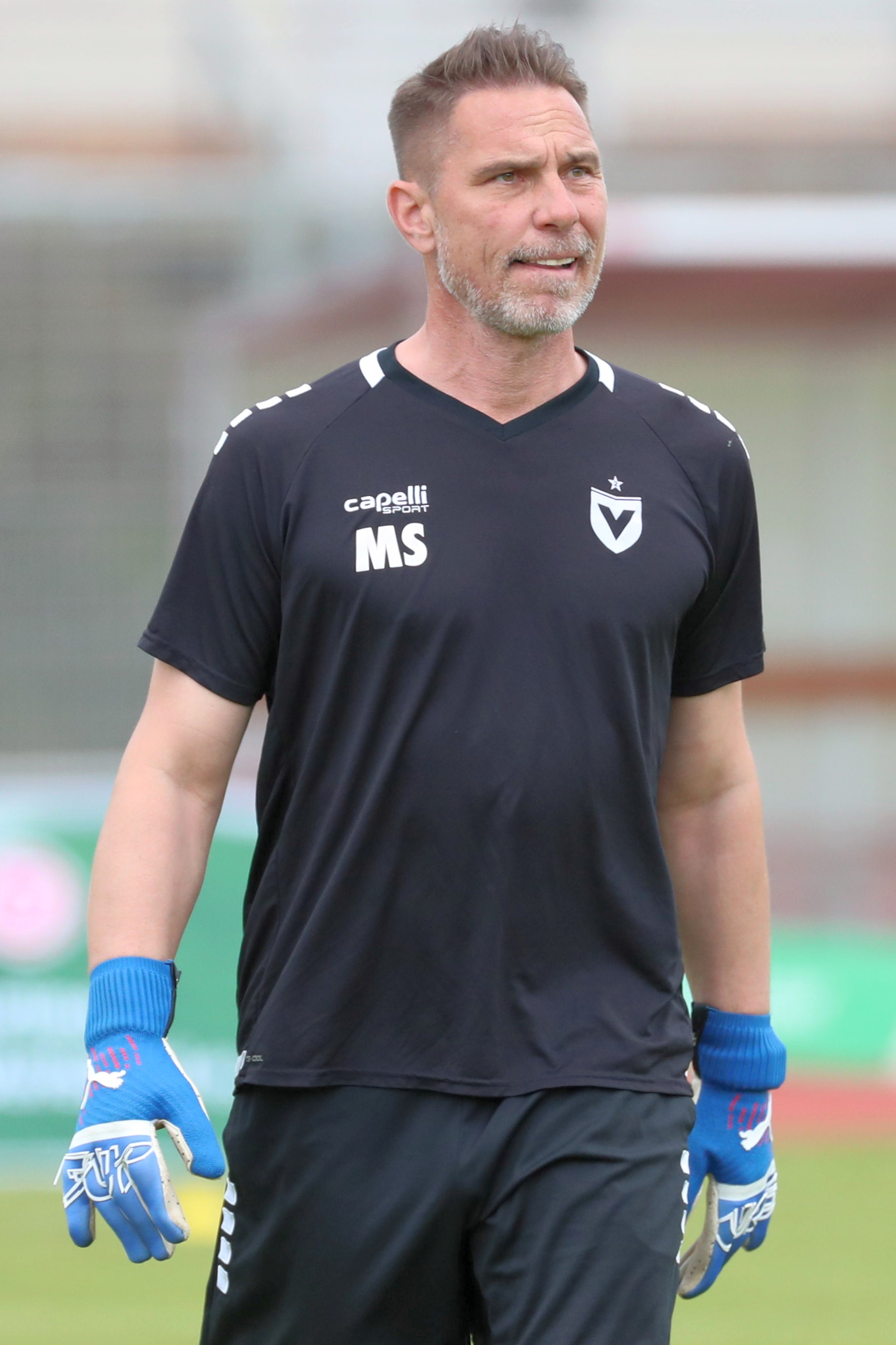

Personal information
- Full name: Marco Sejna
- Date of birth: 20 March 1972 (age 54)
- Place of birth: West Berlin, West Germany
- Height: 1.90 m (6 ft 3 in)
- Position: Goalkeeper

Youth career
- 1978–1985: Hertha BSC
- 1985–1988: 1. FC Lübars
- 1988–1991: Hertha BSC

Senior career*
Years	Team	Apps	(Gls)
1991–1995	Hertha BSC	61	(0)
1995–1997	Tennis Borussia Berlin	61	(0)
1997–1999	FC Sachsen Leipzig	55	(0)
1999–2002	Rot Weiss Ahlen	33	(0)
2000–2003	Rot-Weiss Essen	11	(0)
2003–2004	Rot Weiss Ahlen	6	(0)
2004–2005	Union Berlin	19	(0)
2005	SV Yeşilyurt	11	(0)
2006–2010	FC Ingolstadt 04	21	(0)
2009–2010	FC Ingolstadt 04 II	2	(0)
2010–2011	Hertha BSC	7	(0)
2010–2012	Hertha BSC II	5	(0)
Total		292	(0)
- * Club domestic league appearances and goals

Marco Sejna (born 20 March 1972 in West Berlin) is a German former professional footballer as a goalkeeper.
