= Rando Pettai =

Estonian film director and film producer (born 1965)

Rando Pettai (born 12 October 1965 in Otepää) is an Estonian film director, film producer, caricaturist and cartoonist.

In 2005 he founded the film studio Pulldozer Film OÜ.

== Selected filmography ==
- 1984 Naksitrallid I (animated film; illustrator)
- 2000 Vanad ja kobedad (television series; producer)
- 2003 Vanad ja kobedad saavad jalad alla (feature film; producer)
- 2003 Õpetajate tuba (television series; producer)
- 2003 Vanad ja kobedad saavad jalad alla (feature film; producer)
- 2008 Saladused (television series; producer)
- 2010 Kälimehed (television series; producer)
- 2016 Savisaare protsess (television series; producer)
