= Boris Kõrver =

Estonian composer (1917–1994)

- Born: 12 April 1917; Revel, Autonomous Governorate of Estonia, Russia
- Died: 17 August 1994 (aged 77); Tallinn, Estonia
- Education: Tallinn State Conservatory
- Occupation: Composer

Boris Kõrver (12 April 1917 – 17 August 1994) was an Estonian composer.

== Biography ==
Kõrver was born in Revel 12 April 1917.

In 1950, he graduated from Tallinn State Conservatory in composition specialty.

During World War II, he belonged to State Artistic Ensembles of the Estonian SSR in Yaroslavl.

Since 1944, he was a member of Estonian Composers' Union. From 1953 to 1966, he was deputy chairman and from 1966 to 1974 chairman of Estonian Composers' Union. His daughter is director and cinematographer Marianne Kõrver.

He died 17 August 1994 in Tallinn.

== Awards ==
- Two Estonian SSR State Prizes (1949, 1950)
- Stalin Prize, 3rd class (1951)
- Merited Art Worker of the Estonian SSR (1955)
- Two Orders of the Red Banner of Labour (1956, 1971)
- People's Artist of the Estonian SSR (1965)
- Order of the Badge of Honour (1967)
- Order of Friendship of Peoples

== Works ==
=== Operettas ===
- Cabbages and Kings [Kapsad ja kuningad] (1971)
- Man with a Goblin [Mees pisuhannaga] (1967)
- Thousand Meters of Love [Tuhat meetrit armastrust] (1965)
- You wish, Please [Teie soov, Palun] (1962)
- Forest Flower [Laanelill] (1959)
- Only a Dream [Ainult unistus] (1955)
- Following Hermes [Hermese kannul] (1946)

=== Musicals ===
- Somewhere at Montparnasse [Kuskil Montparnasse'il] (1979)
- Money Pulls All the Wires [Raha paneb rattad kaima] (1978)
- The Companion [Seltsidaam] (1945/1973)

=== Musicals for Children ===
- Toomas, The Nestling [Toomas Linnupoeg] (1984)

=== Works for symphony orchestra ===
- Poem [Poeem] (1958-1959)
- Suite [Suit]

=== Works for chamber orchestra ===
- Moldavian Dance [Moldaavla tants] (1971)

=== Works for string orchestra ===
- Suite [Suit] (1975)

=== Works for wind orchestra ===
- Welcome, Veterans [Tervist, Veteranid] (1979)
- Our Crew [Meie ekipaaz] (1961)
- Cannon Air Force Group's March [Ohukaitse Suurtukivae Grupi Marss] (1939)
- Public Festival [Rahvapidu]
- Slow waltz [Aeglane valss]

=== Works for other orchestras ===
- Suite for Folk Orchestra [Suit rahvapilliorkestrile] (1953)

=== Works for solo violin and orchestra ===
- Violin Concerto [Viiulikontsert] (1951/1973)

=== Duos ===
- Five Pieces for Cello with Piano Accompaniment [Viis pala tsellole klaveri saatel] (1949)
- Horn Piece [Sarvelugu]
- Memories [Malestused]

=== Works for large ensemble ===
- Moldavian Dance [Moldaavia tants] (1971)
