= Fabian Hergesell =

German footballer

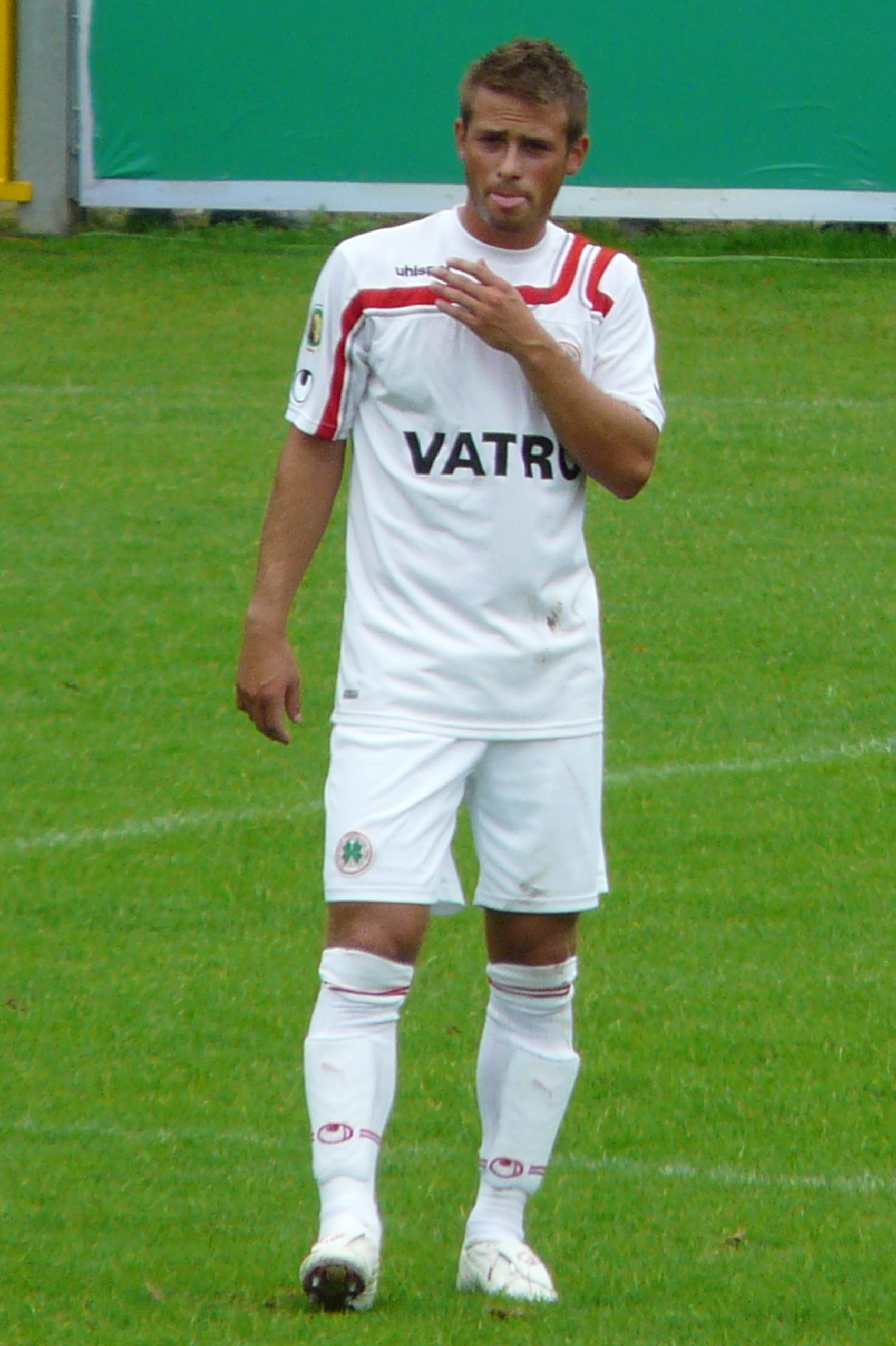
- Hergesell with Rot-Weiß Oberhausen

Personal information
- Date of birth: 25 December 1985 (age 40)
- Place of birth: Leverkusen, West Germany
- Height: 1.76 m (5 ft 9 in)
- Position: Left-back

Youth career
- –1996: BV Bergisch Neukirchen
- 1996–2004: Bayer 04 Leverkusen

Senior career*
Years	Team	Apps	(Gls)
2004–2007	Bayer Leverkusen II		
2007–2010	Fortuna Düsseldorf	69	(1)
2010–2011	Rot-Weiß Oberhausen	25	(0)
2011	Viktoria Köln	9	(0)
2012–2015	Preußen Münster	102	(1)
2015–2017	Rot-Weiß Erfurt	19	(0)
- * Club domestic league appearances and goals as of 31 July 2017

Fabian Hergesell (born 25 December 1985) is a German former professional footballer who played as a left-back.
