= The Measure of Man =

2011 film directed by Marianne Kõrver

- Directed by: Marianne Kõrver
- Written by: Kaie Kotov
- Release date: 1 April 2011 (Estonia)
- Running time: 56 Minutes
- Country: Estonia
- Language: English

The Measure of Man (Estonian: Inimese mõõt) is a documentary film about global ecological problems told via personal stories.

The documentary was produced in Estonia in 2010. Film director is Marianne Kõrver, script by Kaie Kotov and Marianne Kõrver.

The film presents stories from a well-off lawyer in the rush of Manhattan, a young barber in ancient town of Hasankeyf in Turkey, a family of fisherman on Lake Tonle Sap in Cambodia, and a publisher in the all-eco quarter Vauban in Freiburg in Germany.

This is the first Estonian film on environmental issues that presents a global problem using original shoots from all continents. Its theoretical background is taken from ecosemiotics and semiotics of landscape, not used earlier in such a way.

== Awards ==
- Audience Choice award from Cinema Planeta 2011.
- Jury's Special Prize from Matsalu Nature Film Festival 2011.

== See also ==
- The Measure of a Man (Star Trek: The Next Generation)
