= Tuuli Roosma =

Estonian television journalist and producer

Tuuli Roosma (born 26 May 1975, Tallinn) is an Estonian television journalist and producer.

Since 1995 she has worked on television as a host, editor and producer. In 2007 she founded the production company Reede.

== Selected filmography ==
- 2008 Fritsud ja blondiinid (documentary; executive producer)
- 2008 Saladused (television series; producer)
- 2008 Teie pilet, palun! (documentary; producer)
- 2010 Ühikarotid (television series; producer)
- 2012 Suletud uste taga (television series; producer)
- 2012 Ühikarotid: Õed (television series; producer)
- 2015 Kristus elab Siberis (documentary; co-producer)
- 2017 Litsid (television series; producer)
