= Kevin Corvers =

German footballer

Personal information
- Date of birth: 17 August 1987 (age 39)
- Place of birth: Oberhausen, West Germany
- Height: 1.94 m (6 ft 4 in)
- Position: Centre-back

Team information
- Current team: Jahn Hiesfeld
- Number: 19

Youth career
- Adler Osterfeld

Senior career*
| Years | Team | Apps | (Gls) |
| –2007 | Adler Osterfeld | | |
| 2007–2010 | VfB Speldorf | 76 | (5) |
| 2010–2012 | Rot-Weiß Oberhausen | 2 | (0) |
| 2010–2012 | Rot-Weiß Oberhausen II | 42 | (1) |
| 2012– | Jahn Hiesfeld | 153 | (13) |

Managerial career
- 2016–2017: Jahn Hiesfeld (assistant)
- * Club domestic league appearances and goals as of 01:42, 6 January 2019 (UTC)

Kevin Corvers (born 17 August 1987) is a German footballer who plays as a centre-back for Jahn Hiesfeld.

== Career ==
Corvers made his professional debut for Rot-Weiß Oberhausen in the 2. Bundesliga on 31 October 2010, coming on as a substitute in the 54th minute for Benjamin Reichert in the 0–3 home loss against FC Augsburg.
