= Marianne Kõrver =

Estonian film director

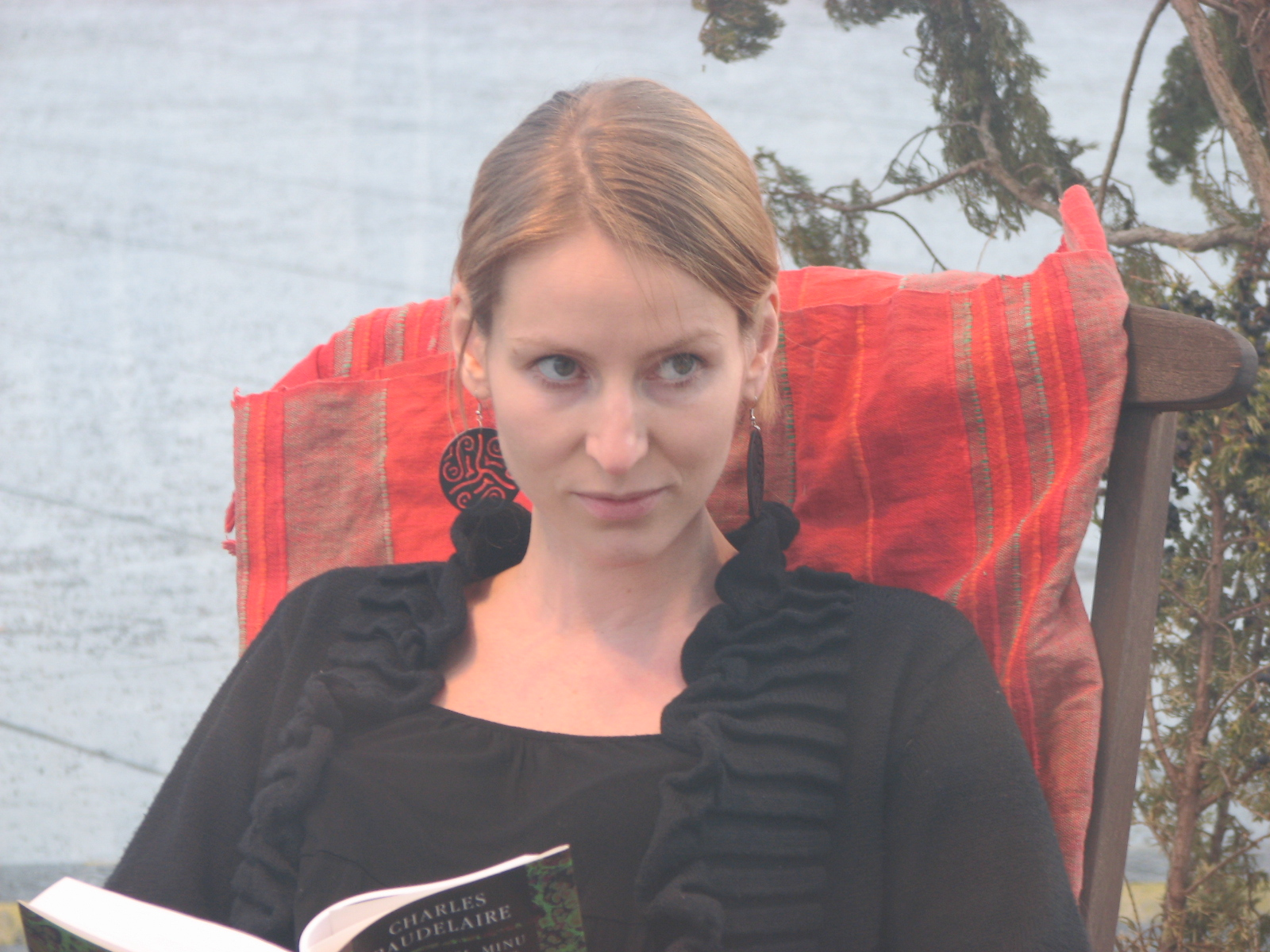
Marianne Kõrver

Marianne Kõrver (born 27 May 1980) is an Estonian film and theatrical director, and cinematographer.

She was born in Tallinn. Her father was composer Boris Kõrver. She graduated from the Tallinn English College and the Nõmme Music School, studied jazz piano and composition at the Georg Ots Tallinn Music College, and studied art at the Estonian Academy of Arts. In 2005 she graduated from Baltic Film, Media and Arts School of Tallinn University.

Since 2003, she is a freelance film and theatrical director and cinematographer.

== Selected filmography ==
- 2008– Saladused (television series; one of the directors)
- 2011 The Measure of Man (documentary film; director)
- 2017 Litsid (television series; cinematographer)
- 2018 Pank (television series; one of the directors)
- 2021 DeStudio. Pohmelus (documentary film; director, cinematographer)
- 2021 Olev Subbi. Elu kuues peatükis (documentary film; director, cinematographer, producer)
- 2025 Meie aasta Brasiilias ("Our Year in Brazil")
- 2025 Meie aasta Jaapanis (Our year in Japan")
