= 2020–21 Arminia Bielefeld season =

Arminia Bielefeld
2020–21 season
- President: Hans-Jürgen Laufer
- Head coach: Uwe Neuhaus (until 1 March); Frank Kramer (from 2 March)
- Stadium: Bielefelder Alm
- Bundesliga: 15th
- DFB-Pokal: First round
- Top goalscorer: League: Ritsu Dōan; Fabian Klos (5 each); All: Ritsu Dōan; Fabian Klos (5 each)
| Home colours | Away colours | Third colours |

The 2020–21 Arminia Bielefeld season was the club's 116th season in existence and the first season back in the top flight of German football. In addition to the domestic league, Arminia Bielefeld participated in this season's edition of the DFB-Pokal. The season covered the period from 1 July 2020 to 30 June 2021.

Arminia was the team with the lowest budget in the Bundesliga. After a defeat in the first round of the DFB-Pokal they had a quite promising start in the Bundesliga season, but from the 4th matchday onwards they could be found among the last five teams in the league table, from the 6th matchday onwards amongst the last four teams. In March, the manager Uwe Neuhaus was replaced by Frank Kramer. A 2–0 win over VfB Stuttgart on the final matchday secured the 15th rank and thus their spot in the 2021–22 Bundesliga.

== Players ==
=== First-team squad ===
As of 7 March 2021

Note: Flags indicate national team as defined under FIFA eligibility rules; some limited exceptions apply. Players may hold more than one non-FIFA nationality.

| No. | Pos. | Nation | Player |
|---|---|---|---|
| 1 | GK | GER | Stefan Ortega |
| 2 | DF | GER | Amos Pieper |
| 4 | DF | SWE | Joakim Nilsson |
| 5 | DF | DEN | Jacob Barrett Laursen |
| 6 | DF | NED | Mike van der Hoorn |
| 7 | MF | AUT | Christian Gebauer |
| 8 | MF | JPN | Ritsu Dōan (on loan from PSV) |
| 9 | FW | GER | Fabian Klos (captain) |
| 10 | MF | GER | Reinhold Yabo |
| 11 | MF | JPN | Masaya Okugawa (on loan from RB Salzburg) |
| 14 | MF | FRO | Jóan Símun Edmundsson |
| 15 | DF | BEL | Nathan de Medina |
| 16 | MF | GER | Fabian Kunze |
| 17 | MF | BEN | Cebio Soukou |

| No. | Pos. | Nation | Player |
|---|---|---|---|
| 18 | FW | VEN | Sergio Córdova (on loan from Augsburg) |
| 19 | MF | AUT | Manuel Prietl |
| 20 | MF | GER | Nils Seufert |
| 21 | FW | GER | Andreas Voglsammer |
| 23 | DF | ANG | Anderson Lucoqui |
| 27 | DF | SUI | Cédric Brunner |
| 28 | MF | NED | Michel Vlap (on loan from Anderlecht) |
| 30 | MF | GER | Marcel Hartel |
| 31 | MF | GER | Arne Maier (on loan from Hertha BSC) |
| 33 | GK | GER | Nikolai Rehnen |
| 34 | GK | SWE | Oscar Linnér |
| 36 | FW | GER | Sven Schipplock |
| 38 | MF | GER | Jomaine Consbruch |
| 40 | GK | GER | Arne Schulz |
| 41 | MF | RUS | Vladislav Cherny |
| 42 | MF | GER | Julian Frommann |

=== Out on loan ===
Note: Flags indicate national team as defined under FIFA eligibility rules; some limited exceptions apply. Players may hold more than one non-FIFA nationality.

| No. | Pos. | Nation | Player |
|---|---|---|---|
| — | DF | GER | Can Özkan (on loan to Næstved Boldklub) |
| — | MF | GER | Joey Müller (on loan to Wuppertaler SV) |
| — | FW | GER | Sebastian Müller (on loan to VfL Osnabrück) |

| No. | Pos. | Nation | Player |
|---|---|---|---|
| — | FW | GER | Mervin Kalac (on loan to SV Lippstadt 08) |
| — | FW | GER | Noel Niemann (on loan to Türkgücü München) |

== Transfers ==
=== In ===
| Date | Pos. | Name | From | Type | Ref. |
|---|---|---|---|---|---|
| 30 June 2020 | MF | (Germany) Can Özkan | Alemannia Aachen | End of Loan | |
| 30 June 2020 | GK | (Germany) Nikolai Rehnen | Alemannia Aachen | End of Loan | |
| 5 July 2020 | FW | (Germany) Prince Osei Owusu | 1860 Munich | End of Loan | |
| 17 August 2020 | FW | (Venezuela) Sergio Córdova | FC Augsburg | Loan | |
| 5 September 2020 | MF | (Japan) Ritsu Dōan | (Netherlands) PSV Eindhoven | Loan | |
| 5 October 2020 | MF | (Germany) Arne Maier | Hertha BSC | Loan | |
| 1 July 2020 | DF | (Denmark) Jacob Barrett Laursen | (Denmark) OB | Free Transfer | |
| 15 July 2020 | FW | (Austria) Christian Gebauer | (Austria) SCR Altach | Free Transfer | |
| 15 July 2020 | DF | (Belgium) Nathan de Medina | (Belgium) Mouscron | Free Transfer | |
| 15 July 2020 | FW | (Germany) Noel Niemann | 1860 Munich | Free Transfer | |
| 4 September 2020 | DF | (Netherlands) Mike van der Hoorn | (England) Swansea City | Free Transfer | |

=== Out ===
| Date | Pos. | Name | To | Type | Transfer Fee | Ref. |
|---|---|---|---|---|---|---|
| 30 June 2020 | GK | (Hungary) Ágoston Kiss | (Hungary) Szombathelyi Haladás | End of Loan | Free | |
| 1 July 2020 | FW | (Germany) Nils Quaschner | Retired | – | – | |
| 1 July 2020 | MF | (Germany) Tom Schütz | – | End of Contract | – | |
| 1 July 2020 | DF | (France) Jonathan Clauss | (France) RC Lens | Free Transfer | Free | |
| 4 August 2020 | DF | (Germany) Florian Hartherz | Fortuna Düsseldorf | Free Transfer | Free | |
| 7 August 2020 | MF | (Germany) Patrick Weihrauch | Dynamo Dresden | Free Transfer | Free | |
| 9 August 2020 | MF | (Germany) Keanu Staude | Würzburger Kickers | Free Transfer | Free | |
| 12 August 2020 | GK | (Germany) Philipp Klewin | Erzgebirge Aue | Free Transfer | Free | |
| 14 August 2020 | DF | (Spain) Álex Pérez | (Spain) UD Logroñés | Free Transfer | Free | |
| 1 September 2020 | DF | (Germany) Stephan Salger | 1860 Munich | Free Transfer | Free | |
| 18 September 2020 | FW | (Germany) Mervin Kalac | SV Lippstadt | Free Transfer | Free | |
| 5 October 2020 | FW | (Germany) Prince Osei Owusu | SC Paderborn | Transfer | | |
| 5 October 2020 | MF | (Germany) Can Özkan | (Denmark) Næstved BK | Loan | Free | |
| 1 January 2021 | DF | (Germany) Brian Behrendt | Eintracht Braunschweig | Transfer | €100K | |

== Pre-season and friendlies ==
Win Draw Loss

| 9 August 2020 Friendly | FC Preußen Espelkamp (Germany) | 0–5 | (Germany) Arminia Bielefeld | Espelkamp, Germany |
| 15:30 CEST (UTC+2) | | | Voglsammer 4'; Schipplock 18'; Soukou 58'; Niemann 82'; Consbruch 87' | Stadium: Sportpark Mittwald |

| 15 August 2020 Friendly | Arminia Bielefeld (Germany) | 1–1 | (Germany) VfL Osnabrück | Bielefeld, Germany |
| 15:30 CEST (UTC+2) | Soukou 61' | | Amenyido 38' | Stadium: Bielefelder Alm |

| 25 August 2020 Friendly | Arminia Bielefeld (Germany) | 0–0 | (Netherlands) Feyenoord | Kufstein, Austria |
| 16:00 CEST (UTC+2) | | | | Stadium: Kufstein Arena |

| 29 August 2020 Friendly | VfB Stuttgart (Germany) | 2–0 | (Germany) Arminia Bielefeld | Kufstein, Austria |
| 16:00 CEST (UTC+2) | González 20' (pen.); Didavi 45' | | | Stadium: Kufstein Arena |

| 2 September 2020 Friendly | Arminia Bielefeld (Germany) | 3–2 | (Germany) MSV Duisburg | Bielefeld, Germany |
| 15:30 CEST (UTC+2) | Klos 19' (pen.); Córdova 63', 88' | | Stoppelkamp 16'; Engin 48' | Stadium: Bielefelder Alm; Attendance: 0 Referee: Martin Thomsen |

| 6 September 2020 Friendly | FC Groningen (Netherlands) | 1–1 | (Germany) Arminia Bielefeld | Groningen, Netherlands |
| 14:30 CEST (UTC+2) | Robben 17' | | Consbruch 22' | Stadium: Euroborg |

| 9 October 2020 Friendly | VfL Bochum (Germany) | 1–1 | (Germany) Arminia Bielefeld | Bochum, Germany |
| 15:30 CEST (UTC+2) | Blum 55' | Report | Consbruch 52' | Stadium: Vonovia-Ruhrstadion |

| 25 March 2021 Friendly | Arminia Bielefeld (Germany) | 1–1 | (Germany) FC St. Pauli | Bielefeld, Germany |
| 15:00 CET (UTC+1) | Voglsammer 19' | Report | Daschner 3' | Stadium: Bielefelder Alm; Referee: Patrick Holz |

== Competitions ==
=== Overview ===
| Competition | First match | Last match | Starting round | Final position | Record | | | | | | | |
| Competition | First match | Last match | Starting round | Final position | Pld | W | D | L | GF | GA | GD | Win % |
|---|---|---|---|---|---|---|---|---|---|---|---|---|
| Bundesliga | 19 September 2020 | 22 May 2021 | Matchday 1 | 15th | 34 | 9 | 8 | 17 | 26 | 52 | −26 | 26.47 |
| DFB-Pokal | 14 September 2020 | | First round | First round | 1 | 0 | 0 | 1 | 0 | 1 | −1 | 0.00 |
| Total | | | | | 35 | 9 | 8 | 18 | 26 | 53 | −27 | 25.71 |

Source: Soccerway

=== Bundesliga ===
==== League table ====
| Pos | Team | Pld | W | D | L | GF | GA | GD | Pts | Qualification or relegation |
|---|---|---|---|---|---|---|---|---|---|---|
| 13 | FC Augsburg | 34 | 10 | 6 | 18 | 36 | 54 | −18 | 36 | |
| 14 | Hertha BSC | 34 | 8 | 11 | 15 | 41 | 52 | −11 | 35 | |
| 15 | Arminia Bielefeld | 34 | 9 | 8 | 17 | 26 | 52 | −26 | 35 | |
| 16 | 1. FC Köln (O) | 34 | 8 | 9 | 17 | 34 | 60 | −26 | 33 | Qualification for the relegation play-offs |
| 17 | Werder Bremen (R) | 34 | 7 | 10 | 17 | 36 | 57 | −21 | 31 | Relegation to 2. Bundesliga |

Source: DFB
Rules for classification: 1) Points; 2) Goal difference; 3) Goals scored; 4) Head-to-head results; 5) Head-to-head away goals scored; 6) Away goals scored; 7) Play-off.
(O) Play-off winners; (R) Relegated

==== Results summary ====
| Overall | | | | | | | | Home | | | | | | Away | | | | | |
| Pld | W | D | L | GF | GA | GD | Pts | W | D | L | GF | GA | GD | W | D | L | GF | GA | GD |
|---|---|---|---|---|---|---|---|---|---|---|---|---|---|---|---|---|---|---|---|
| 34 | 9 | 8 | 17 | 26 | 52 | −26 | 35 | 6 | 2 | 9 | 13 | 23 | −10 | 3 | 6 | 8 | 13 | 29 | −16 |

Source: DFB

==== Results by round ====
| Round | 1 | 2 | 3 | 4 | 5 | 6 | 7 | 8 | 9 | 10 | 11 | 12 | 13 | 14 | 15 | 16 | 17 | 18 | 19 | 20 | 21 | 22 | 23 | 24 | 25 | 26 | 27 | 28 | 29 | 30 | 31 | 32 | 33 | 34 |
|---|---|---|---|---|---|---|---|---|---|---|---|---|---|---|---|---|---|---|---|---|---|---|---|---|---|---|---|---|---|---|---|---|---|---|
| Ground | A | H | A | H | A | H | A | H | A | H | A | H | A | H | H | A | H | H | A | H | A | H | A | H | A | H | A | H | A | H | A | A | H | A |
| Result | D | W | L | L | L | L | L | L | L | W | L | L | W | L | W | D | W | L | L | L | D | L | L | D | W | L | D | W | D | W | L | D | D | W |
| Position | 8 | 6 | 10 | 14 | 14 | 15 | 15 | 16 | 17 | 16 | 16 | 16 | 16 | 16 | 15 | 15 | 15 | 15 | 16 | 16 | 16 | 16 | 16 | 16 | 15 | 17 | 17 | 16 | 15 | 15 | 16 | 16 | 15 | 15 |

Source: DFB
A = Away; H = Home; W = Win; D = Draw; L = Loss

==== Matches ====
The league fixtures were announced on 7 August 2020.

| 19 September 2020 1 | Eintracht Frankfurt | 1–1 | Arminia Bielefeld | Frankfurt |
| 15:30 CEST (UTC+2) | Dost (yellow card) 33'; Barkok (yellow card) 55'; Silva 62' | Report | De Medina (yellow card) 7'; Soukou 51'; Brunner (yellow card) 70' | Stadium: Waldstadion; Attendance: 6,500; Referee: Benjamin Brand |

| 26 September 2020 2 | Arminia Bielefeld | 1–0 | 1. FC Köln | Bielefeld |
| 15:30 CEST (UTC+2) | Klos (yellow card) 45'; Edmundsson 78'; Soukou (yellow card) 89'; Schipplock (yellow card) 90+1' | Report | Hector (yellow card) 17'; Czichos (yellow card) 43'; Sørensen (yellow card) 90+2' | Stadium: Bielefelder Alm; Attendance: 5,460; Referee: Patrick Ittrich |

| 3 October 2020 3 | Werder Bremen | 1–0 | Arminia Bielefeld | Bremen |
| 15:30 CEST (UTC+2) | Bittencourt 27'; Friedl (yellow card) 40'; Eggestein (yellow card) 90+1' | Report | Lucoqui (yellow card) 52'; Van der Hoorn (yellow card) 90+4' | Stadium: Weser-Stadion; Attendance: 0 Referee: Robert Schröder |

| 17 October 2020 4 | Arminia Bielefeld | 1–4 | Bayern Munich | Bielefeld |
| 18:30 CEST (UTC+2) | Dōan 58'; De Medina (yellow card) 74' | Report | Müller 8', 51'; Lewandowski 26', 45+1'; Tolisso (red card) 76' | Stadium: Bielefelder Alm; Attendance: 0 Referee: Daniel Siebert |

| 25 October 2020 5 | VfL Wolfsburg | 2–1 | Arminia Bielefeld | Wolfsburg |
| 15:30 CET (UTC+1) | Weghorst 19'; Arnold 20', (yellow card) 49'; Philipp (yellow card) 78' | Report | Klos (yellow card) 10'; Schipplock 80' | Stadium: Volkswagen Arena; Attendance: 4,519; Referee: Manuel Gräfe |

| 31 October 2020 6 | Arminia Bielefeld | 0–2 | Borussia Dortmund | Bielefeld |
| 15:30 CET (UTC+1) | Brunner (yellow card) 26' | Report | Hummels 53', 71'; Delaney (yellow card) 63' | Stadium: Bielefelder Alm; Attendance: 0 Referee: Bastian Dankert |

| 7 November 2020 7 | Union Berlin | 5–0 | Arminia Bielefeld | Berlin |
| 15:30 CET (UTC+1) | Endo 3'; Andrich 13'; Becker 45+2'; Kruse 52' (pen.); Teuchert 89' | Report | Van der Hoorn (yellow card) 59' | Stadium: Stadion An der Alten Försterei; Attendance: 0 Referee: Matthias Jöllenbeck |

| 21 November 2020 8 | Arminia Bielefeld | 1–2 | Bayer Leverkusen | Bielefeld |
| 15:30 CET (UTC+1) | Hrádecký 47' (o.g.) | Report | Bailey 27'; Dragović (yellow card) 65', (goal) 88' | Stadium: Bielefelder Alm; Attendance: 0 Referee: Felix Brych |

| 28 November 2020 9 | RB Leipzig | 2–1 | Arminia Bielefeld | Leipzig |
| 15:30 CET (UTC+1) | Angeliño 29'; Nkunku 47'; Sørloth (penalty missed) 73'; Orbán (yellow card) 85'; Kampl (yellow card) 90+1' | Report | Van der Hoorn (yellow card) 38'; Klos 75'; Lucoqui (yellow card) 77' | Stadium: Red Bull Arena; Attendance: 0 Referee: Robert Hartmann |

| 5 December 2020 10 | Arminia Bielefeld | 2–1 | Mainz 05 | Bielefeld |
| 15:30 CET (UTC+1) | Prietl 21'; Dōan 31'; Schipplock (yellow card) 74'; Hartel (yellow card) 85'; Kunze (yellow card) 90+4' | Report | Niakhaté (yellow card) 49'; St. Juste (yellow card) 66'; Stöger 82' | Stadium: Bielefelder Alm; Attendance: 0 Referee: Marco Fritz |

| 12 December 2020 11 | SC Freiburg | 2–0 | Arminia Bielefeld | Freiburg |
| 15:30 CET (UTC+1) | Höler (yellow card) 26'; Höfler (yellow card) 66'; Grifo 79' (pen.), (yellow card) 80'; Jeong 90+2' | Report | | Stadium: Schwarzwald-Stadion; Attendance: 0 Referee: Harm Osmers |

| 16 December 2020 12 | Arminia Bielefeld | 0–1 | FC Augsburg | Bielefeld |
| 20:30 CET (UTC+1) | Kunze (yellow card) 19' | Report | Framberger (yellow card) 45+1'; Gruezo (yellow card) 80'; Gouweleeuw 85' | Stadium: Bielefelder Alm; Attendance: 0 Referee: Patrick Ittrich |

| 19 December 2020 13 | Schalke 04 | 0–1 | Arminia Bielefeld | Gelsenkirchen |
| 15:30 CET (UTC+1) | Oczipka (yellow card) 26'; Serdar (yellow card) 57'; Mendyl (yellow card) 60'; Harit (yellow card) 85'; Raman (yellow card) 90'; Sané (yellow card) 90+6' | Report | Prietl (yellow card) 31'; Klos 53'; Pieper (yellow card) 55'; Brunner (yellow card) 66'; Schipplock (yellow card) 74'; Dōan (yellow card) 86' | Stadium: Veltins-Arena; Attendance: 0 Referee: Bastian Dankert |

| 2 January 2021 14 | Arminia Bielefeld | 0–1 | Borussia Mönchengladbach | Bielefeld |
| 15:30 CET (UTC+1) | De Medina (yellow card) 20'; Ortega (yellow card) 62' | Report | Neuhaus (yellow card) 40'; Embolo 58' | Stadium: Bielefelder Alm; Attendance: 0 Referee: Sascha Stegemann |

| 10 January 2021 15 | Arminia Bielefeld | 1–0 | Hertha BSC | Bielefeld |
| 18:00 CET (UTC+1) | Laursen (yellow card) 26'; Yabo 64' | Report | Pekarík (yellow card) 51' | Stadium: Bielefelder Alm; Attendance: 0 Referee: Guido Winkmann |

| 16 January 2021 16 | 1899 Hoffenheim | 0–0 | Arminia Bielefeld | Sinsheim |
| 15:30 CET (UTC+1) | John (yellow card) 37' | Report | Nilsson (yellow card) 77' | Stadium: Rhein-Neckar-Arena; Attendance: 0 Referee: Marco Fritz |

| 20 January 2021 17 | Arminia Bielefeld | 3–0 | VfB Stuttgart | Bielefeld |
| 20:30 CET (UTC+1) | Klos 27'; Kempf 47' (o.g.); Yabo (yellow card) 60'; Dōan 86' | Report | | Stadium: Bielefelder Alm; Attendance: 0 Referee: Robert Hartmann |

| 23 January 2021 18 | Arminia Bielefeld | 1–5 | Eintracht Frankfurt | Bielefeld |
| 15:30 CET (UTC+1) | Kunze (yellow card) 30'; Córdova 36'; Seufert (yellow card) 66' | Report | Silva 25', 33'; Kostić 27'; Ndicka (yellow card) 39'; Younes (yellow card) 45+2'; Nilsson 51' (o.g.); Jović 75' | Stadium: Bielefelder Alm; Attendance: 0 Referee: Robert Schröder |

| 31 January 2021 19 | 1. FC Köln | 3–1 | Arminia Bielefeld | Cologne |
| 15:30 CET (UTC+1) | Wolf 10', 28'; Jakobs (yellow card) 42'; Duda (yellow card) 54'; Rexhbeçaj 63' | Report | Soukou (yellow card) 64'; Córdova 73' | Stadium: RheinEnergieStadion; Attendance: 0 Referee: Felix Zwayer |

| 15 February 2021 21 | Bayern Munich | 3–3 | Arminia Bielefeld | Munich |
| 20:30 CET (UTC+1) | Lewandowski 48'; Tolisso 58', (yellow card) 78'; Davies 70' | Report | Vlap 9'; Pieper 37'; Gebauer 49'; Kunze (yellow card) 80' | Stadium: Allianz Arena; Attendance: 0 Referee: Florian Badstübner |

| 19 February 2021 22 | Arminia Bielefeld | 0–3 | VfL Wolfsburg | Bielefeld |
| 20:30 CET (UTC+1) | | Report | Steffen 29', 47'; Brooks (yellow card) 37'; Arnold 54'; Guilavogui (yellow card) 80' | Stadium: Bielefelder Alm; Attendance: 0 Referee: Felix Brych |

| 27 February 2021 23 | Borussia Dortmund | 3–0 | Arminia Bielefeld | Dortmund |
| 15:30 CET (UTC+1) | Dahoud 48'; Sancho 58' (pen.); Reinier 81' | Report | Pieper (yellow card) 57'; Kunze (yellow card) 72'; Prietl (yellow card) 83' | Stadium: Signal Iduna Park; Attendance: 0 Referee: Tobias Reichel |

| 7 March 2021 24 | Arminia Bielefeld | 0–0 | Union Berlin | Bielefeld |
| 18:00 CET (UTC+1) | | Report | | Stadium: Bielefelder Alm; Attendance: 0 Referee: Harm Osmers |

| 10 March 2021 20 | Arminia Bielefeld | 0–2 | Werder Bremen | Bielefeld |
| 18:30 CET (UTC+1) | De Medina (red card) 71'; Pieper (yellow card) 90+6' | Report | Friedl (yellow card) 35'; Sargent 47'; Möhwald 75'; Eggestein (yellow card) 87' | Stadium: Bielefelder Alm; Attendance: 0 Referee: Markus Schmidt |
Note: The match was originally scheduled for 7 February 2021, but was postponed due to heavy snow causing a waterlogged pitch.

| 14 March 2021 25 | Bayer Leverkusen | 1–2 | Arminia Bielefeld | Leverkusen |
| 13:30 CET (UTC+1) | Frimpong (yellow card) 49'; Schick 85'; Wendell (yellow card) 90+6' | Report | Pieper (yellow card) 16'; Dōan 18'; Okugawa 57' | Stadium: BayArena; Attendance: 0 Referee: Sascha Stegemann |

| 19 March 2021 26 | Arminia Bielefeld | 0–1 | RB Leipzig | Bielefeld |
| 20:30 CET (UTC+1) | Pieper (yellow card) 71'; Brunner (yellow card) 83' | Report | Sabitzer 46'; Kampl (yellow card) 85' | Stadium: Bielefelder Alm; Attendance: 0 Referee: Frank Willenborg |

| 3 April 2021 27 | Mainz 05 | 1–1 | Arminia Bielefeld | Mainz |
| 15:30 CEST (UTC+2) | Bell (yellow card) 13'; Brosinski 56' (pen.); Latza (yellow card) 73'; Barreiro (yellow card) 80'; Hack (yellow card) 90+4' | Report | Lucoqui (yellow card) 14'; Voglsammer 76' | Stadium: Opel Arena; Attendance: 0 Referee: Deniz Aytekin |

| 9 April 2021 28 | Arminia Bielefeld | 1–0 | SC Freiburg | Bielefeld |
| 20:30 CEST (UTC+2) | Klos (yellow card) 56'; Voglsammer (yellow card) 58'; Santamaria 68' (o.g.); De Medina (yellow card) 90+3' | Report | Santamaria (yellow card) 56'; Schmid (yellow card) 85' | Stadium: Bielefelder Alm; Attendance: 0 Referee: Martin Petersen |

| 17 April 2021 29 | FC Augsburg | 0–0 | Arminia Bielefeld | Augsburg |
| 15:30 CEST (UTC+2) | Strobl (yellow card) 27'; Khedira (yellow card) 44'; Caligiuri (yellow card) 83'; Gikiewicz (yellow card) 90+1' | Report | Schipplock (yellow card) 90+1' | Stadium: WWK Arena; Attendance: 0 Referee: Markus Schmidt |

| 20 April 2021 30 | Arminia Bielefeld | 1–0 | Schalke 04 | Bielefeld |
| 20:30 CEST (UTC+2) | Klos (yellow card) 25', (goal) 50', (penalty missed) 80'; Brunner (yellow card) 39'; Pieper (yellow card) 53' | Report | Thiaw (yellow card) 58' (yellow-red card) 71'; Stambouli (yellow card) 64'; Kolašinac (yellow card) 90+1'; Sané (yellow card) 90+4' | Stadium: Bielefelder Alm; Attendance: 0 Referee: Christian Dingert |

| 25 April 2021 31 | Borussia Mönchengladbach | 5–0 | Arminia Bielefeld | Mönchengladbach |
| 18:00 CEST (UTC+2) | Embolo 6', 69'; Thuram 15'; Bensebaini 18' (pen.); Lazaro (yellow card) 36'; Pléa 84' | Report | De Medina (yellow card) 52' | Stadium: Borussia-Park; Attendance: 0 Referee: Robert Hartmann |

| 9 May 2021 32 | Hertha BSC | 0–0 | Arminia Bielefeld | Berlin |
| 18:00 CEST (UTC+2) | Tousart (yellow card) 36'; Darida (yellow card) 90+1'; Radonjić (yellow card) 90+4' | Report | Prietl (yellow card) 37'; Brunner (yellow card) 51'; Lucoqui (yellow card) 87'; Kunze (yellow card) 90+1' | Stadium: Olympiastadion; Attendance: 0 Referee: Bastian Dankert |

| 15 May 2021 33 | Arminia Bielefeld | 1–1 | 1899 Hoffenheim | Bielefeld |
| 15:30 CEST (UTC+2) | Voglsammer 23'; Lucoqui (yellow card) 85' | Report | Kramarić 5'; Adamyan (yellow card) 12'; Gaćinović (yellow card) 90+1' | Stadium: Bielefelder Alm; Attendance: 0 Referee: Daniel Schlager |

| 22 May 2021 34 | VfB Stuttgart | 0–2 | Arminia Bielefeld | Stuttgart |
| 15:30 CEST (UTC+2) | Ahamada (yellow card) 65' | Report | Klos 66' (pen.); Dōan 72' | Stadium: Mercedes-Benz Arena; Attendance: 0 Referee: Tobias Stieler |

=== DFB-Pokal ===
| 14 September 2020 First round | Rot-Weiss Essen | 1–0 | Arminia Bielefeld | Essen |
| 18:30 CEST (UTC+2) | Engelmann 33', (yellow card) 73'; Grote (yellow card) 49'; Backszat (yellow card) 59'; Kehl-Gómez (yellow card) 67'; Condé (yellow card) 90+5' | Report | Prietl (yellow card) 74' | Stadium: Stadion Essen; Attendance: 300; Referee: Harm Osmers |

== Statistics ==
=== Appearances and goals ===
| No. | Pos | Nat | Player | Total | | Bundesliga | | DFB-Pokal | |
| No. | Pos | Nat | Player | Apps | Goals | Apps | Goals | Apps | Goals |
Goalkeepers
| 1 | GK | (Germany) GER | Stefan Ortega | 35 | 0 | 34 | 0 | 1 | 0 |
| 31 | GK | (Germany) GER | Nikolai Rehnen | 0 | 0 | 0 | 0 | 0 | 0 |
| 34 | GK | (Sweden) SWE | Oscar Linnér | 0 | 0 | 0 | 0 | 0 | 0 |
Defenders
| 2 | DF | (Germany) GER | Amos Pieper | 31 | 1 | 30 | 1 | 1 | 0 |
| 4 | DF | (Sweden) SWE | Joakim Nilsson | 27 | 0 | 25+1 | 0 | 1 | 0 |
| 5 | DF | (Denmark) DEN | Jacob Barrett Laursen | 17 | 0 | 13+3 | 0 | 1 | 0 |
| 6 | DF | (Netherlands) NED | Mike van der Hoorn | 22 | 0 | 15+7 | 0 | 0 | 0 |
| 15 | DF | (Belgium) BEL | Nathan de Medina | 16 | 0 | 7+9 | 0 | 0 | 0 |
| 23 | DF | (Angola) ANG | Anderson Lucoqui | 22 | 0 | 18+3 | 0 | 0+1 | 0 |
| 27 | DF | (Switzerland) SUI | Cédric Brunner | 32 | 0 | 30+1 | 0 | 1 | 0 |
Midfielders
| 7 | MF | (Austria) AUT | Christian Gebauer | 23 | 1 | 5+18 | 1 | 0 | 0 |
| 8 | MF | (Japan) JPN | Ritsu Dōan | 35 | 5 | 33+1 | 5 | 1 | 0 |
| 10 | MF | (Germany) GER | Reinhold Yabo | 13 | 1 | 8+5 | 1 | 0 | 0 |
| 11 | MF | (Japan) JPN | Masaya Okugawa | 13 | 1 | 11+2 | 1 | 0 | 0 |
| 14 | MF | (Faroe Islands) FRO | Jóan Símun Edmundsson | 5 | 1 | 0+5 | 1 | 0 | 0 |
| 16 | MF | (Germany) GER | Fabian Kunze | 26 | 0 | 12+14 | 0 | 0 | 0 |
| 17 | MF | (Benin) BEN | Cebio Soukou | 15 | 1 | 5+9 | 1 | 1 | 0 |
| 19 | MF | (Austria) AUT | Manuel Prietl | 29 | 1 | 28 | 1 | 1 | 0 |
| 20 | MF | (Germany) GER | Nils Seufert | 13 | 0 | 2+11 | 0 | 0 | 0 |
| 28 | MF | (Netherlands) NED | Michel Vlap | 7 | 1 | 5+2 | 1 | 0 | 0 |
| 30 | MF | (Germany) GER | Marcel Hartel | 23 | 0 | 20+2 | 0 | 1 | 0 |
| 31 | MF | (Germany) GER | Arne Maier | 18 | 0 | 13+5 | 0 | 0 | 0 |
| 38 | MF | (Germany) GER | Jomaine Consbruch | 1 | 0 | 0 | 0 | 1 | 0 |
Forwards
| 9 | FW | (Germany) GER | Fabian Klos | 35 | 5 | 32+2 | 5 | 1 | 0 |
| 18 | FW | (Venezuela) VEN | Sergio Córdova | 24 | 2 | 13+10 | 2 | 0+1 | 0 |
| 21 | FW | (Germany) GER | Andreas Voglsammer | 18 | 2 | 12+6 | 2 | 0 | 0 |
| 36 | FW | (Germany) GER | Sven Schipplock | 32 | 1 | 5+27 | 1 | 0 | 0 |
Players transferred out during the season
| 22 | FW | (Germany) GER | Noel Niemann | 1 | 0 | 0 | 0 | 0+1 | 0 |

Last updated: 22 May 2021

=== Goalscorers ===
As of 28 January 2021

| Rank | No. | Pos | Nat | Name | Bundesliga | DFB-Pokal | Total |
|---|---|---|---|---|---|---|---|
| 1 | 8 | MF | (Japan) | Ritsu Dōan | 5 | 0 | 5 |
| 1 | 9 | FW | (Germany) | Fabian Klos | 5 | 0 | 5 |
| 2 | 18 | FW | (Venezuela) | Sergio Córdova | 2 | 0 | 2 |
| 2 | 21 | FW | (Germany) | Andreas Voglsammer | 2 | 0 | 2 |
| 2 | 14 | MF | (Faroe Islands) | Jóan Símun Edmundsson | 1 | 0 | 1 |
| 2 | 29 | MF | (Benin) | Cebio Soukou | 1 | 0 | 1 |
| 2 | 19 | MF | (Austria) | Manuel Prietl | 1 | 0 | 1 |
| 2 | 10 | MF | (Germany) | Reinhold Yabo | 1 | 0 | 1 |
| 2 | 36 | FW | (Germany) | Sven Schipplock | 1 | 0 | 1 |
| 2 | 2 | DF | (Germany) | Amos Pieper | 1 | 0 | 1 |
| 2 | 7 | MF | (Austria) | Christian Gebauer | 1 | 0 | 1 |
| 2 | 11 | MF | (Japan) | Masaya Okugawa | 1 | 0 | 1 |
| 2 | 28 | MF | (Netherlands) | Michel Vlap | 1 | 0 | 1 |
| Own Goal | | | | | 3 | 0 | 3 |
| Totals | | | | | 26 | 0 | 26 |
