= 2021–22 Arminia Bielefeld season =

Arminia Bielefeld
2021–22 season
- President: Hans-Jürgen Laufer
- Head coach: Frank Kramer (until 20 April); Marco Kostmann (caretaker, from 20 April)
- Stadium: Bielefelder Alm
- Bundesliga: 17th (relegated)
- DFB-Pokal: Second round
- Top goalscorer: League: Masaya Okugawa (8); All: Masaya Okugawa (9)
Home colours	Away colours	Third colours

The 2021–22 season was the 117th season in the existence of Arminia Bielefeld and the club's second consecutive season in the top flight of German football. Arminia started the season with three draws, but at the end of October, after only two draws out of seven matches in the league (and a defeat in the second round of the DFB-Pokal) they were in danger of even losing touch to the 16th rank. They started November with 1–0 win away over VfB Stuttgart, their first win in the whole Bundesliga season. That match sort of stabilized Arminias performance. They even won 2–0 away over RB Leipzig in December, and after a 2–2 draw against SpVgg Greuther Fürth in January they climbed up to the 16th rank after having been 17th for about three months. In February they even climbed up to the 14th rank after a 1–0 win over 1. FC Union Berlin. But this match was the last win in the season. Especially two draws and a defeat against the other relegation battlers FC Augsburg, VfB Stuttgart and Hertha BSC Berlin at home and a 4–0 defeat away at VfL Wolfsburg, at least partially a relegation battler in that season, let them fall to the 17th rank. They remained on the 17th rank even after the coach Frank Kramer was dismissed on 20 April and thus were relegated to the 2. Bundesliga.

== Players ==
=== First-team squad ===
Note: Flags indicate national team as defined under FIFA eligibility rules; some limited exceptions apply. Players may hold more than one non-FIFA nationality.

No.	Pos.	Nation	Player
1	GK	GER	Stefan Ortega (vice-captain)
2	DF	GER	Amos Pieper
3	DF	POR	Guilherme Ramos
4	DF	SWE	Joakim Nilsson
5	DF	DEN	Jacob Barrett Laursen
7	MF	GER	Gonzalo Castro
8	MF	AUT	Alessandro Schöpf
9	FW	GER	Fabian Klos (co-captain)
10	FW	FRA	Bryan Lasme
11	MF	JPN	Masaya Okugawa
13	GK	GRE	Stefanos Kapino
15	DF	BEL	Nathan de Medina
16	MF	GER	Fabian Kunze

No.	Pos.	Nation	Player
17	MF	TUR	Burak İnce
18	FW	GER	Florian Krüger
19	MF	AUT	Manuel Prietl (co-captain)
20	MF	AUT	Patrick Wimmer
21	FW	GER	Robin Hack
23	FW	GER	Janni Serra
24	DF	USA	George Bello
27	DF	SUI	Cédric Brunner
30	DF	PAN	Andrés Andrade (on loan from LASK)
34	GK	SWE	Oscar Linnér
35	GK	GER	Arne Schulz
37	MF	RUS	Vladislav Cherny
39	MF	GRE	Sebastian Vasiliadis

=== Out on loan ===
Note: Flags indicate national team as defined under FIFA eligibility rules; some limited exceptions apply. Players may hold more than one non-FIFA nationality.

No.	Pos.	Nation	Player
—	DF	NED	Mike van der Hoorn (at FC Utrecht until 30 June 2022)
—	MF	GER	Jomaine Consbruch (at Eintracht Braunschweig until 30 June 2022)
—	MF	AUT	Christian Gebauer (at Ingolstadt until 30 June 2022)

No.	Pos.	Nation	Player
—	MF	GER	Noel Niemann (at TSV Hartberg until 30 June 2022)
—	FW	GER	Sebastian Müller (at Eintracht Braunschweig until 30 June 2022)

== Pre-season and friendlies ==
Win Draw Loss Fixtures

3 July 2021 Friendly	SC Verl (Germany)	3–0	(Germany) Arminia Bielefeld	Verl, Germany
15:00 CEST (UTC+2)	Rabihic 10'; Sağlık 64', 84' (pen.)	Report		Stadium: Sportclub Arena

10 July 2021 Friendly	Arminia Bielefeld (Germany)	1–0	(Germany) Hannover 96	Bielefeld, Germany
15:00 CEST (UTC+2)	Serra 48'	Report		Stadium: Trainingsgelände DSC

18 July 2021 Friendly	Krasnodar (Russia)	Cancelled	(Germany) Arminia Bielefeld	Schwaz, Austria
15:30 CEST (UTC+2)		Report		Stadium: Silberstadt Arena

23 July 2021 Friendly	VfB Stuttgart (Germany)	5–2 (a.e.t.)	(Germany) Arminia Bielefeld	Kufstein, Austria
16:15 CEST (UTC+2)	Massimo 34', 39'; Thommy 96'; Sankoh 105', 114'	Report	Krüger 40'; Nilsson 74'	Stadium: Kufstein Arena

31 July 2021 Friendly	Arminia Bielefeld (Germany)	1–1	(Netherlands) FC Twente	Bielefeld, Germany
15:30 CEST (UTC+2)	Klos (yellow card) 61', (goal) 67'; Kunze (yellow card) 69'; Brunner (yellow card) 80'	Report	Van Wolfswinkel 25' (pen.); Unnerstall (yellow card) 47'; Troupée (yellow card) 56'; Oosterwolde (yellow card) 66'	Stadium: Bielefelder Alm; Attendance: 3,713

== Competitions ==
=== Overall record ===
Competition	First match	Last match	Starting round	Final position	Record							
Competition	First match	Last match	Starting round	Final position	Pld	W	D	L	GF	GA	GD	Win %
Bundesliga	14 August 2021	14 May 2022	Matchday 1	17th	34	5	13	16	27	53	−26	14.71
DFB-Pokal	7 August 2021	26 October 2021	First round	Second round	2	1	0	1	8	6	+2	50.00
Total					36	6	13	17	35	59	−24	16.67

Source: Soccerway

=== Bundesliga ===
==== League table ====
Pos	Team	Pld	W	D	L	GF	GA	GD	Pts	Qualification or relegation
14	FC Augsburg	34	10	8	16	39	56	−17	38	
15	VfB Stuttgart	34	7	12	15	41	59	−18	33	
16	Hertha BSC (O)	34	9	6	19	37	71	−34	33	Qualification for the relegation play-offs
17	Arminia Bielefeld (R)	34	5	13	16	27	53	−26	28	Relegation to 2. Bundesliga
18	Greuther Fürth (R)	34	3	9	22	28	82	−54	18	Relegation to 2. Bundesliga

Source: DFB
Rules for classification: 1) Points; 2) Goal difference; 3) Goals scored; 4) Head-to-head results; 5) Head-to-head away goals scored; 6) Away goals scored; 7) Play-off.
(O) Play-off winners; (R) Relegated

==== Results summary ====
Overall								Home						Away					
Pld	W	D	L	GF	GA	GD	Pts	W	D	L	GF	GA	GD	W	D	L	GF	GA	GD
34	5	13	16	27	53	−26	28	2	9	5	14	22	−8	3	4	11	13	31	−18

Source: DFB

==== Results by round ====
Round	1	2	3	4	5	6	7	8	9	10	11	12	13	14	15	16	17	18	19	20	21	22	23	24	25	26	27	28	29	30	31	32	33	34
Ground	H	A	H	A	H	A	H	A	H	H	A	H	A	H	A	H	A	A	H	A	H	A	H	A	H	A	A	H	A	H	A	H	A	H
Result	D	D	D	L	D	L	L	D	L	L	W	D	L	D	L	W	W	D	D	W	D	L	W	L	L	L	L	D	L	L	L	D	L	D
Position	11	13	12	14	13	16	16	17	17	17	17	17	17	17	17	17	17	17	16	14	15	15	14	14	15	15	17	16	16	17	17	17	17	17

Source: DFB
A = Away; H = Home; W = Win; D = Draw; L = Loss

==== Matches ====
The league fixtures were announced on 25 June 2021.

14 August 2021 1	Arminia Bielefeld	0–0	SC Freiburg	Bielefeld
15:30 CEST (UTC+2)	Prietl (yellow card) 17'; Laursen (yellow card) 30'; Klos (yellow card) 89'	Report	Keitel (yellow card) 34'; Gulde (yellow card) 37'; Höfler (yellow card) 75'; Demirović (yellow card) 90+3'	Stadium: Bielefelder Alm; Attendance: 13,750; Referee: Sven Jablonski

21 August 2021 2	Greuther Fürth	1–1	Arminia Bielefeld	Fürth
15:30 CEST (UTC+2)	Seguin (yellow card) 5'; Nielsen (yellow card) 14'; Hrgota 50' (pen.); Sarpei (yellow card) 59'; Bauer (yellow card) 62'	Report	Klos 45'; Schöpf (yellow card) 54' (yellow-red card) 68'	Stadium: Sportpark Ronhof; Attendance: 5,890; Referee: Daniel Schlager

28 August 2021 3	Arminia Bielefeld	1–1	Eintracht Frankfurt	Bielefeld
18:30 CEST (UTC+2)	Wimmer 86'	Report	Ndicka (yellow card) 7'; Hauge 22'; Lenz (yellow card) 45'; Hrustic (yellow card) 90+7'	Stadium: Bielefelder Alm; Attendance: 13,750; Referee: Bastian Dankert

12 September 2021 4	Borussia Mönchengladbach	3–1	Arminia Bielefeld	Mönchengladbach
19:30 CEST (UTC+2)	Stindl 35', 69'; Scally (yellow card) 68'; Zakaria 72'	Report	Okugawa 45+2'; Hack (yellow card) 75'	Stadium: Borussia-Park; Attendance: 24,500; Referee: Sascha Stegemann

18 September 2021 5	Arminia Bielefeld	0–0	1899 Hoffenheim	Bielefeld
15:30 CEST (UTC+2)	Wimmer (yellow card) 45'; Lasme (yellow card) 68'	Report	Kramarić (yellow card) 86'	Stadium: Bielefelder Alm; Attendance: 13,750; Referee: Patrick Ittrich

25 September 2021 6	Union Berlin	1–0	Arminia Bielefeld	Berlin
15:30 CEST (UTC+2)	Becker (yellow card) 83'; Behrens 88'	Report		Stadium: Stadion An der Alten Försterei; Attendance: 11,000; Referee: Marco Fritz

3 October 2021 7	Arminia Bielefeld	0–4	Bayer Leverkusen	Bielefeld
19:30 CEST (UTC+2)	Brunner (yellow card) 10'; Wimmer (yellow card) 55'; Czyborra (yellow card) 66'; Ortega (yellow card) 90+2'	Report	Hincapié (yellow card) 7'; Diaby 18'; Schick 24', 57'; Demirbay 90+1' (pen.)	Stadium: Bielefelder Alm; Attendance: 16,250; Referee: Felix Zwayer

17 October 2021 8	FC Augsburg	1–1	Arminia Bielefeld	Augsburg
17:30 CEST (UTC+2)	Oxford 19'; Vargas (yellow card) 50'; Hahn (yellow card) 74'; Córdova (yellow card) 86'	Report	Wimmer (yellow card) 27'; Laursen 77'	Stadium: WWK Arena; Attendance: 17,500; Referee: Robert Schröder

23 October 2021 9	Arminia Bielefeld	1–3	Borussia Dortmund	Bielefeld
15:30 CEST (UTC+2)	Kunze (yellow card) 83'; Klos 87' (pen.)	Report	Can 31' (pen.); Hummels 45'; Bellingham 72'	Stadium: Bielefelder Alm; Attendance: 25,000; Referee: Benjamin Brand

30 October 2021 10	Arminia Bielefeld	1–2	Mainz 05	Bielefeld
15:30 CEST (UTC+2)	Laursen 42'; Andrade (yellow card) 52'; Prietl (yellow card) 70'	Report	Lee 25'; Kohr (yellow card) 58'; Burkardt 69'; Hack (yellow card) 77'; Bell (yellow card) 80'	Stadium: Bielefelder Alm; Attendance: 19,477; Referee: Bastian Dankert

6 November 2021 11	VfB Stuttgart	0–1	Arminia Bielefeld	Stuttgart
15:30 CET (UTC+1)		Report	Okugawa 19'; Brunner (yellow card) 54'; Kunze (yellow card) 83'; Prietl (yellow card) 90+3'	Stadium: Mercedes-Benz Arena; Attendance: 33,550; Referee: Christian Dingert

20 November 2021 12	Arminia Bielefeld	2–2	VfL Wolfsburg	Bielefeld
15:30 CET (UTC+1)	Pieper (yellow card) 2'; Okugawa 11'; Vasiliadis (yellow card) 47'; Klos 54' (pen.); De Medina (yellow card) 89'; Schöpf (yellow card) 90+1'	Report	L. Nmecha (yellow card) 22', (goal) 63'; Weghorst 62'	Stadium: Bielefelder Alm; Attendance: 19,801; Referee: Martin Petersen

27 November 2021 13	Bayern Munich	1–0	Arminia Bielefeld	Munich
18:30 CET (UTC+1)	Hernandez (yellow card) 64'; Sané 71'	Report	Lasme (yellow card) 82'	Stadium: Allianz Arena; Attendance: 12,000; Referee: Marco Fritz

4 December 2021 14	Arminia Bielefeld	1–1	1. FC Köln	Bielefeld
15:30 CET (UTC+1)	Kunze (yellow card) 20'; Lasme 60'	Report	Özcan 17'; Schindler (yellow card) 31'	Stadium: Bielefelder Alm; Attendance: 8,231; Referee: Felix Brych

11 December 2021 15	Hertha BSC	2–0	Arminia Bielefeld	Berlin
15:30 CET (UTC+1)	Darida (yellow card) 15'; Jovetić 52'; Selke 90+5'	Report	Brunner (yellow card) 88'	Stadium: Olympiastadion; Attendance: 5,000; Referee: Tobias Welz

14 December 2021 16	Arminia Bielefeld	2–0	VfL Bochum	Bielefeld
20:30 CET (UTC+1)	Okugawa 51'; Wimmer (yellow card) 62', (goal) 69'; Kunze (yellow card) 81'	Report	Polter (yellow card) 26'; Pantović (yellow card) 26'	Stadium: Bielefelder Alm; Attendance: 13,750; Referee: Benjamin Brand

18 December 2021 17	RB Leipzig	0–2	Arminia Bielefeld	Leipzig
15:30 CET (UTC+1)		Report	Andrade (yellow card) 26'; Serra 57'; Klos (red card) 70'; Okugawa 75'; Kunze (yellow card) 90'	Stadium: Red Bull Arena; Attendance: 0 Referee: Frank Willenborg

8 January 2022 18	SC Freiburg	2–2	Arminia Bielefeld	Freiburg
15:30 CET (UTC+1)	Haberer 6'; Joeng 46'; K. Schlotterbeck (yellow card) 53'; Gulde (yellow card) 76'	Report	Okugawa 60'; Hack (yellow card) 69'; Lasme 87'	Stadium: Europa-Park Stadion; Attendance: 500; Referee: Harm Osmers

16 January 2022 19	Arminia Bielefeld	2–2	Greuther Fürth	Bielefeld
17:30 CET (UTC+1)	Okugawa 8'; Vasiliadis (yellow card) 38'; Andrade (yellow card) 43'; Nilsson (yellow card) 52'; Castro 83'; Ramos (yellow card) 86'	Report	Itter (yellow card) 31'; Leweling 35'; Nielsen 67'	Stadium: Bielefelder Alm; Attendance: 750; Referee: Christian Dingert

21 January 2022 20	Eintracht Frankfurt	0–2	Arminia Bielefeld	Frankfurt
20:30 CET (UTC+1)	Rode (yellow card) 51'; Hasebe (yellow card) 80'; Kostić (yellow card) 90+4'; Paciência (yellow card) 90+4'	Report	Wimmer 5'; Schöpf 27'; Andrade (yellow card) 73'; Nilsson (yellow card) 90+4'	Stadium: Deutsche Bank Park; Attendance: 1,000; Referee: Tobias Reichel

5 February 2022 21	Arminia Bielefeld	1–1	Borussia Mönchengladbach	Bielefeld
15:30 CET (UTC+1)	Serra 19'; Kunze (yellow card) 58'; Wimmer (yellow card) 64'; Nilsson (yellow card) 74'	Report	Koné (yellow card) 28'; Pléa 38', (yellow card) 90+3'; Lainer (yellow card) 82'	Stadium: Bielefelder Alm; Attendance: 10,000; Referee: Benjamin Cortus

13 February 2022 22	1899 Hoffenheim	2–0	Arminia Bielefeld	Sinsheim
17:30 CET (UTC+1)	Hübner 22'; Geiger (yellow card) 45+1'; Rutter 51'; Grillitsch (yellow card) 90+5'	Report		Stadium: Rhein-Neckar-Arena; Attendance: 10,000; Referee: Robert Hartmann

19 February 2022 23	Arminia Bielefeld	1–0	Union Berlin	Bielefeld
15:30 CET (UTC+1)	Okugawa 53'	Report	Jaeckel (yellow card) 35'; Ryerson (yellow card) 78'	Stadium: Bielefelder Alm; Attendance: 10,000; Referee: Daniel Schlager

26 February 2022 24	Bayer Leverkusen	3–0	Arminia Bielefeld	Leverkusen
15:30 CET (UTC+1)	Alario 30'; Diaby 57', 81'	Report	Kunze (yellow card) 60'	Stadium: BayArena; Attendance: 10,000; Referee: Martin Petersen

4 March 2022 25	Arminia Bielefeld	0–1	FC Augsburg	Bielefeld
20:30 CET (UTC+1)	Vasiliadis (yellow card) 45+4'; Klos (yellow card) 54'; Brunner (yellow card) 75'	Report	Caligiuri (yellow card) 21', (goal) 50'; Gruezo (yellow card) 26'; Gregoritsch (yellow card) 73'; Valentin (yellow card) 78'; Morávek (yellow card) 90+1'	Stadium: Bielefelder Alm; Attendance: 19,460; Referee: Felix Brych

13 March 2022 26	Borussia Dortmund	1–0	Arminia Bielefeld	Dortmund
17:30 CET (UTC+1)	Wolf 21'; Can (yellow card) 46'	Report	Brunner (yellow card) 19'	Stadium: Signal Iduna Park; Attendance: 33,000; Referee: Bastian Dankert

19 March 2022 27	Mainz 05	4–0	Arminia Bielefeld	Mainz
15:30 CET (UTC+1)	Burkardt 1', 75' (pen.); Kohr (yellow card) 10'; Niakhaté 65' (pen.); Ingvartsen 79' (pen.)	Report		Stadium: Opel Arena; Attendance: 25,000; Referee: Felix Zwayer

2 April 2022 28	Arminia Bielefeld	1–1	VfB Stuttgart	Bielefeld
15:30 CEST (UTC+2)	Brunner (yellow card) 28'; Krüger 59'	Report	Kalajdžić 25' (pen.), (yellow card) 29'; Anton (yellow card) 33'; Tomás (yellow card) 47'; Karazor (yellow card) 73'; Mangala (yellow card) 90+7'	Stadium: Bielefelder Alm; Attendance: 26,011; Referee: Patrick Ittrich

9 April 2022 29	VfL Wolfsburg	4–0	Arminia Bielefeld	Wolfsburg
15:30 CEST (UTC+2)	Nmecha 11', 38'; Arnold 48'; Kruse 53'	Report	Nilsson (yellow card) 55'	Stadium: Volkswagen Arena; Attendance: 22,512; Referee: Benjamin Brand

17 April 2022 30	Arminia Bielefeld	0–3	Bayern Munich	Bielefeld
15:30 CEST (UTC+2)	Kunze (yellow card) 25'	Report	Laursen 10' (o.g.); Nianzou (yellow card) 45'; Gnabry 45+7'; Kimmich (yellow card) 65'; Musiala 85'	Stadium: Bielefelder Alm; Attendance: 26,419; Referee: Matthias Jöllenbeck

23 April 2022 31	1. FC Köln	3–1	Arminia Bielefeld	Cologne
15:30 CEST (UTC+2)	Uth 3', (yellow card) 69'; Modeste 43'; Özcan (yellow card) 67'; Thielmann 86'	Report	Pieper (yellow card) 30'; Serra (yellow card) 32'; Hübers 33' (o.g.); Wimmer (yellow card) 38'	Stadium: RheinEnergieStadion; Attendance: 50,000; Referee: Tobias Stieler

30 April 2022 32	Arminia Bielefeld	1–1	Hertha BSC	Bielefeld
15:30 CEST (UTC+2)	De Medina (yellow card) 34'; Wimmer (yellow card) 65'; Kunze (yellow card) 84'; Nilsson 90+1'	Report	Tousart 54'; Richter (yellow card) 75'	Stadium: Bielefelder Alm; Attendance: 26,021; Referee: Deniz Aytekin

6 May 2022 33	VfL Bochum	2–1	Arminia Bielefeld	Bochum
20:30 CEST (UTC+2)	Polter 22'; Bello 89' (o.g.)	Report	Nilsson 35'	Stadium: Vonovia Ruhrstadion; Attendance: 25,000; Referee: Robert Schröder

14 May 2022 34	Arminia Bielefeld	1–1	RB Leipzig	Bielefeld
15:30 CEST (UTC+2)	Serra 70'; Nilsson (yellow card) 85'	Report	Adams (yellow card) 88'; Orbán 90+3'	Stadium: Bielefelder Alm; Attendance: 22,719; Referee: Daniel Siebert

=== DFB-Pokal ===
7 August 2021 First round	SpVgg Bayreuth	3–6	Arminia Bielefeld	Bayreuth
15:30 CEST (UTC+2)	T. Weber (yellow card) 4'; Knežević 14'; Maderer 52'; Nilsson 68' (o.g.); Weimar (yellow card) 90+1'; F. Weber (yellow card) 90+1'	Report	Laursen 11', (yellow card) 67'; Klos 28', (yellow card) 90+1'; Lasme 51', 85'; Nilsson 73'; Pieper (yellow card) 78'; Kunze 79'	Stadium: Hans-Walter-Wild-Stadion; Attendance: 5,000; Referee: Robert Hartmann

26 October 2021 Second round	Mainz 05	3–2 (a.e.t.)	Arminia Bielefeld	Mainz
20:45 CEST (UTC+2)	Burkardt 53'; Onisiwo 59'; Ingvartsen 114'	Report	Okugawa 2'; Prietl (yellow card) 20'; Schöpf (yellow card) 38'; Pieper (yellow card) 48'; Klos 89'	Stadium: Mewa Arena; Attendance: 10,000; Referee: Sascha Stegemann
