= Cédric Brunner =

Swiss footballer (born 1994)

Personal information
- Full name: Cédric Brunner
- Date of birth: 17 February 1994 (age 32)
- Place of birth: Zollikon, Switzerland
- Height: 1.80 m (5 ft 11 in)
- Position: Right-back

Youth career
- –2006: FC Maur
- 2006–2014: FC Zürich

Senior career*
Years	Team	Apps	(Gls)
2014–2018	FC Zürich	82	(1)
2018–2022	Arminia Bielefeld	108	(3)
2022–2024	Schalke 04	45	(0)
2025–2026	FC Wollishofen		
Total		235	(4)
- * Club domestic league appearances and goals

Cédric Brunner (born 17 February 1994) is a Swiss professional footballer who plays as a right-back.

== Career ==
On 7 July 2022, following the expiration of his contract with Arminia Bielefeld, Brunner signed a two-year contract with Schalke 04.

On 28 January 2025, he announced his retirement from professional football and moved to FC Wollishofen in the lower divisions.

== Career statistics ==
Appearances and goals by club, season and competition
Club	Season	League			Cup		Europe		Total	
Club	Season	Division	Apps	Goals	Apps	Goals	Apps	Goals	Apps	Goals
FC Zürich	2013–14	Swiss Super League	1	0	0	0	0	0	1	0
FC Zürich	2014–15	Swiss Super League	5	0	1	0	1	0	7	0
FC Zürich	2015–16	Swiss Super League	23	0	3	0	1	0	27	0
FC Zürich	2016–17	Swiss Challenge League	28	1	3	0	6	0	37	1
FC Zürich	2017–18	Swiss Super League	25	0	4	1	—		29	1
FC Zürich	Total		82	1	11	1	8	0	101	2
Arminia Bielefeld	2018–19	2. Bundesliga	23	1	1	0	—		24	1
Arminia Bielefeld	2019–20	2. Bundesliga	27	2	0	0	—		27	2
Arminia Bielefeld	2020–21	Bundesliga	31	0	1	0	—		32	0
Arminia Bielefeld	2021–22	Bundesliga	27	0	1	0	—		28	0
Arminia Bielefeld	Total		108	3	3	0	—		111	3
Schalke 04	2022–23	Bundesliga	28	0	1	0	—		29	0
Schalke 04	2023–24	2. Bundesliga	17	0	1	0	—		18	0
Schalke 04	Total		45	0	2	0	—		47	0
Career total			235	4	16	1	8	0	259	5

== Honours ==
FC Zürich

- Swiss Cup: 2015–16, 2017–18
- Swiss Challenge League: 2016–17

Arminia Bielefeld

- 2. Bundesliga: 2019–20
