= Fabian Klos =

German association football player

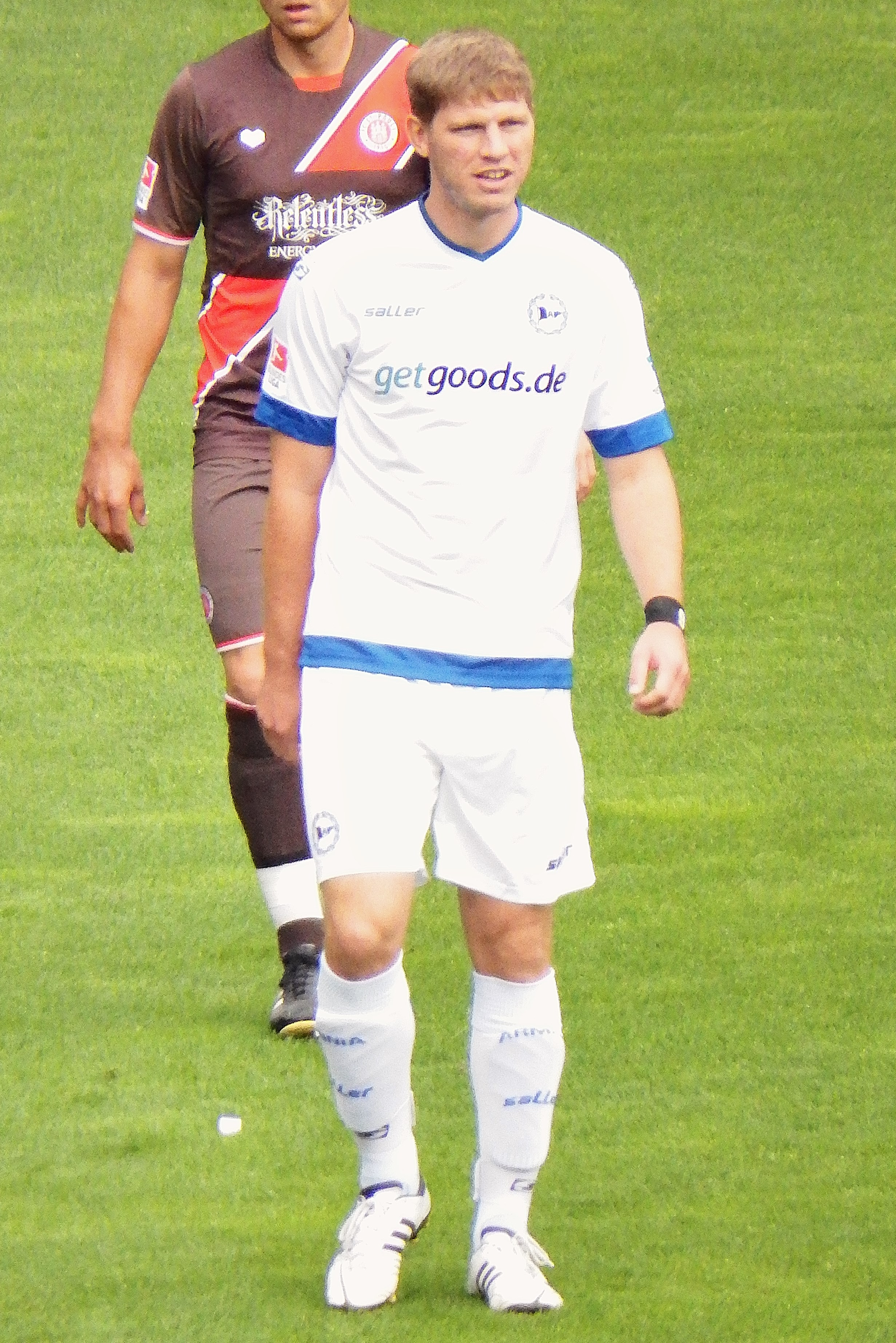
- Klos with Arminia Bielefeld in 2013

Personal information
- Date of birth: 2 December 1987 (age 38)
- Place of birth: Gifhorn, West Germany
- Height: 1.94 m (6 ft 4 in)
- Position: Forward

Senior career*
Years	Team	Apps	(Gls)
2005–2007	SV Meinersen		
2007–2009	MTV Gifhorn	58	(49)
2009–2011	VfL Wolfsburg II	65	(22)
2011–2024	Arminia Bielefeld	381	(146)
- * Club domestic league appearances and goals

Fabian Klos (born 2 December 1987) is a German former professional footballer who played as a forward.

== Career ==
Born in Gifhorn, Klos was a prolific scorer in amateur football in Lower Saxony.

In 2009, he joined VfL Wolfsburg II spending two years in the Regionalliga Nord.

In 2011, he signed for Arminia Bielefeld of the 3. Liga alongside team-mate Maximilian Ahlschwede, and made his debut on the opening day of the 2011–12 season, as a substitute for Johannes Rahn in a 2–1 defeat against VfB Stuttgart II. He scored ten goals in his first season with Bielefeld, and was named as 3. Liga player of the year. He scored 20 goals in the 2012–13 season, finishing as joint top-scorer of the 3. Liga, along with Chemnitzer FC's Anton Fink, as Bielefeld were promoted to the 2. Bundesliga as runners-up.

In October 2013, he suffered a concussion during a match, but returned to the pitch after one and half month. After the season his team got relegated to the 3. Liga again. In spite of offers from some 2. Bundesliga sides, Klos stayed with Arminia. He became the team's captain and - for the second time - the league's top-scorer. Arminia returned to the 2. Bundesliga, where they would stay for five seasons.

After Jeff Saibene had become Arminia's manager, Klos started many games on the bench. Dynamo Dresden was already interested in him after the 2016-17 season, but he decided to improve his fitness and to fight to become a part of the starting XI again. Nevertheless, Julian Börner was elected captain for the 2017-18 season.

In April 2018 he becomes Arminia Bielefeld's all-time top-scorer. In 2019, he became the team's captain again. Furthermore, he was the league's top-scorer in the 2019-20 season, scoring 21 goals. Thus, Arminia got promoted to the Bundesliga.

He scored his first goal on 28 November at RB Leipzig away. In fact, he played every match in the 2020–21 season. In February 2022, the club and him had already agreed to let his contract expire after the 2021–22 season. But in April, he suffered a serious head injury and had to end the season. Thus - and perhaps because the relegation to the 2. Bundesliga was already foreseeable - he decided to stay.

Klos retired from playing at the end of the 2023–24 season.

== Career statistics ==
As of 10 July 2023

Appearances and goals by club, season and competition
Club	Season	League			Cup		Other		Total	
Club	Season	Division	Apps	Goals	Apps	Goals	Apps	Goals	Apps	Goals
VfL Wolfsburg II	2009–10	Regionalliga Nord	32	9	—		—		32	9
VfL Wolfsburg II	2010–11	Regionalliga Nord	33	13	—		—		33	13
VfL Wolfsburg II	Total		65	22	—		—		65	22
Arminia Bielefeld	2011–12	3. Liga	33	10	1	0	—		34	10
Arminia Bielefeld	2012–13	3. Liga	33	20	2	0	—		35	20
Arminia Bielefeld	2013–14	2. Bundesliga	29	9	2	0	2 (Note: Appearances in 2. Bundesliga relegation play-offs)	0	33	9
Arminia Bielefeld	2014–15	3. Liga	35	23	5	1	—		40	24
Arminia Bielefeld	2015–16	2. Bundesliga	32	12	1	0	—		33	12
Arminia Bielefeld	2016–17	2. Bundesliga	33	13	4	2	—		37	15
Arminia Bielefeld	2017–18	2. Bundesliga	33	7	1	1	—		34	8
Arminia Bielefeld	2018–19	2. Bundesliga	33	17	2	0	—		35	17
Arminia Bielefeld	2019–20	2. Bundesliga	33	21	2	1	—		35	22
Arminia Bielefeld	2020–21	Bundesliga	34	5	1	0	—		35	5
Arminia Bielefeld	2021–22	Bundesliga	25	3	2	2	—		27	5
Arminia Bielefeld	2022–23	2. Bundesliga	28	6	1	2	2	1	31	9
Arminia Bielefeld	2023–24	3. Liga	36	9	2	0	3	0	41	9
Arminia Bielefeld	Total		381	146	24	9	4	1	409	156
Career total			446	168	24	9	4	1	474	178
