= Ritsu Dōan =

Japanese professional footballer

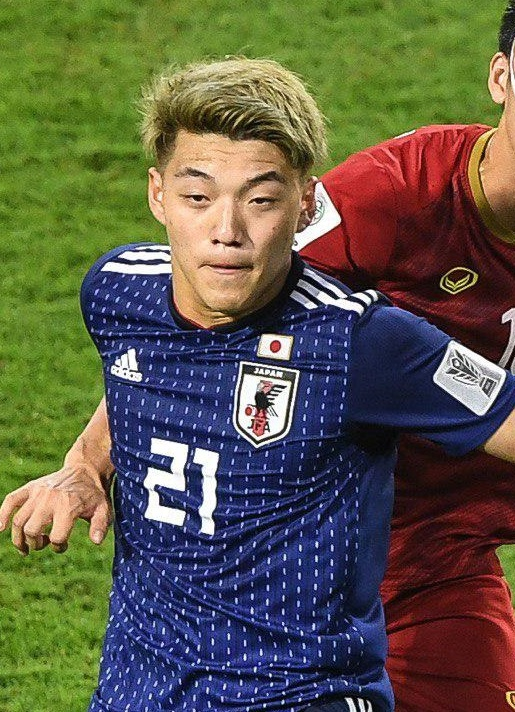
- Dōan with Japan at the 2019 AFC Asian Cup

Personal information
- Full name: Ritsu Dōan
- Date of birth: 16 June 1998 (age 28)
- Place of birth: Amagasaki, Hyogo, Japan
- Height: 1.72 m (5 ft 8 in)
- Position: Right winger

Team information
- Current team: Eintracht Frankfurt
- Number: 20

Youth career
- 2005–2010: Nishinomiya Soccer School
- 2011–2015: Gamba Osaka

Senior career*
| Years | Team | Apps | (Gls) |
| 2015–2018 | Gamba Osaka | 15 | (3) |
| 2017–2018 | → Groningen (loan) | 29 | (9) |
| 2018–2019 | Groningen | 34 | (6) |
| 2019–2022 | PSV | 43 | (10) |
| 2020–2021 | → Arminia Bielefeld (loan) | 34 | (5) |
| 2022–2025 | SC Freiburg | 97 | (22) |
| 2025– | Eintracht Frankfurt | 38 | (5) |

International career^{‡}
| 2014 | Japan U16 | 4 | (1) |
| 2016 | Japan U19 | 19 | (5) |
| 2017 | Japan U20 | 5 | (3) |
| 2019–2021 | Japan Olympic | 11 | (6) |
| 2018– | Japan | 74 | (12) |
Medal record
Representing Japan
AFC Asian Cup
| Runner-up | 2019 United Arab Emirates |
AFC U-19 Championship
| Winner | 2016 Bahrain |
- * Club domestic league appearances and goals as of 1 November 2026 ‡ National team caps and goals as of 14 November 2026

Ritsu Dōan (堂安 律, Dōan Ritsu; born 16 June 1998) is a Japanese professional footballer who plays as a right winger for Bundesliga club Eintracht Frankfurt and the Japan national team.

== Youth career ==
Dōan attended Amagasaki Municipal Urakaze Elementary School and Amagasaki Municipal Odaminami Junior High School.

During his elementary school years, he played for Urakaze FC and also honed his technical skills at the Vissel Kobe soccer school; later, he joined Nishinomiya SS. Upon entering junior high school, he received offers from the junior youth teams of Gamba Osaka, Cerezo Osaka, Vissel Kobe, and Nagoya Grampus Eight, ultimately choosing to join Gamba Osaka Junior Youth. In 2012, while with the junior youth team, he achieved an unprecedented national treble at the U-15 level.

At the Gamba youth academy, he quickly distinguished himself as an attacking midfielder capable of playing on either flank; thanks to his powerful physique and left-footed play, he was dubbed the "next Akihiro Ienaga"—a fellow Gamba youth product who shared similar characteristics.

== Club career ==
=== Gamba Osaka ===
Coming through the youth system, Dōan joined J1 League club Gamba Osaka in 2015. On 27 May, he debuted against FC Seoul in the 2015 AFC Champions League. In 2016, he mainly played for their Gamba Osaka's newly-established reserve team Gamba Osaka U-23 in the J3 League.

=== Groningen ===
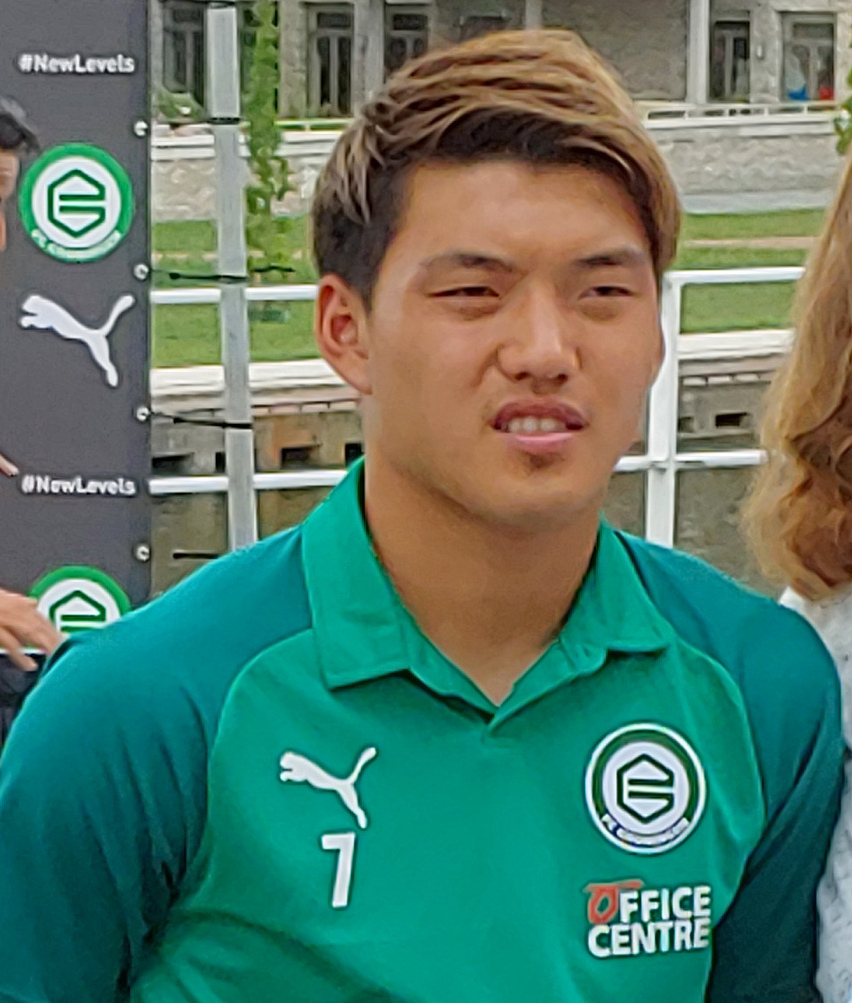
Doan with Groningen in 2019

In June 2017, Dōan moved to Eredivisie club FC Groningen on loan with an option to purchase on a three-year contract. The option was exercised on 23 April 2018, and Dōan transferred to Groningen on a permanent basis on 1 July 2018.

On 15 April 2018, against Roda, Dōan scored his eighth goal of the season, equaling the total of goals Arjen Robben scored as a teenager for Groningen.

=== PSV Eindhoven ===
Dōan joined PSV Eindhoven on a five-year contract in 2019.

==== Loan to Arminia Bielefeld ====
In September 2020, he moved on loan to Bundesliga side Arminia Bielefeld for the 2020–21 season. Dōan made his debut in the opening game of the season, a 1–1 draw against Eintracht Frankfurt. Dōan scored his first goal for Bielefeld in a 4–1 home defeat against Bayern Munich.

=== SC Freiburg ===
On 5 July 2022, SC Freiburg announced that they had signed Dōan ahead of the 2022–23 season. Later that year, he scored his first goal for the club on 6 August, in a 4–0 win versus Augsburg. In the 2024–25 season, he became his club's top scorer with 10 goals, all scored in the Bundesliga.

=== Eintracht Frankfurt ===
On 7 August 2025, Dōan joined fellow Bundesliga side Eintracht Frankfurt by signing a contract until 2030.

== International career ==
=== Youth ===
In May 2017, Dōan was elected Japan national under-20 team for the 2017 U-20 World Cup. At this tournament, he played full-time in all four matches and scored three goals.

=== Senior ===
On 30 August 2018, Dōan received his first international call-up from the Japan national team for the Kirin Challenge Cup 2018. He started his debut appearance in a friendly match against Costa Rica on 11 September 2018, and scored his debut goal in a friendly match against Uruguay on 16 October 2018.

He was called-up by Hajime Moriyasu to represent Japan in the 2022 FIFA World Cup. He featured in Japan's first match of the competition against Germany on 23 November 2022, being subbed on in the second half while Japan was 1–0 down. Dōan scored the equalizer four minutes after coming on as his side later went on to win the game 2–1. In an almost identical turn of events, he was subbed on in the second half of Japan's final group stage match against Spain on 1 December 2022 while Japan was 1–0 down, and scored the equalizer two minutes after coming on as his side later went on to win 2–1. The win ultimately qualified Japan for the tournament's knockout stages as group winners.

On 15 May 2026, Dōan was selected in the 26-man squad for the 2026 FIFA World Cup.

== Career statistics ==
=== Club ===
As of match played 1 November 2026

Appearances and goals by club, season and competition
| Club | Season | League | | | National cup (Note: Includes Emperor's Cup, KNVB Cup, DFB-Pokal) | | League cup (Note: Includes J.League Cup) | | Continental | | Other | | Total | |
| Club | Season | Division | Apps | Goals | Apps | Goals | Apps | Goals | Apps | Goals | Apps | Goals | Apps | Goals |
|---|---|---|---|---|---|---|---|---|---|---|---|---|---|---|
| Gamba Osaka | 2015 | J1 League | 2 | 0 | 0 | 0 | 1 | 0 | 0 | 0 | 1 (Note: Appearance in J1 League championship stage) | 0 | 4 | 0 |
| Gamba Osaka | 2016 | J1 League | 3 | 0 | 1 | 0 | 0 | 0 | 1 (Note: Appearance(s) in AFC Champions League) | 0 | 0 | 0 | 5 | 0 |
| Gamba Osaka | 2017 | J1 League | 10 | 3 | 0 | 0 | 0 | 0 | 6 | 1 | — | | 16 | 4 |
| Gamba Osaka | Total | | 15 | 3 | 1 | 0 | 1 | 0 | 7 | 1 | 1 | 0 | 25 | 4 |
| Groningen (loan) | 2017–18 | Eredivisie | 29 | 9 | 2 | 1 | — | | — | | — | | 31 | 10 |
| Groningen | 2018–19 | Eredivisie | 30 | 5 | 1 | 0 | — | | — | | 2 (Note: Appearances in Eredivisie European play-offs) | 0 | 33 | 5 |
| Groningen | 2019–20 | Eredivisie | 2 | 1 | — | | — | | — | | — | | 2 | 1 |
| Groningen | Total | | 32 | 6 | 1 | 0 | 0 | 0 | 0 | 0 | 2 | 0 | 35 | 6 |
| PSV Eindhoven | 2019–20 | Eredivisie | 19 | 2 | 2 | 0 | — | | 4 (Note: Appearances in UEFA Europa League) | 0 | — | | 25 | 2 |
| PSV Eindhoven | 2021–22 | Eredivisie | 24 | 8 | 5 | 2 | — | | 10 (Note: Four appearances in UEFA Europa League, six appearances and one goal in UEFA Europa Conference League) | 1 | — | | 39 | 11 |
| PSV Eindhoven | Total | | 43 | 10 | 7 | 2 | 0 | 0 | 14 | 1 | 0 | 0 | 64 | 13 |
| Arminia Bielefeld (loan) | 2020–21 | Bundesliga | 34 | 5 | 1 | 0 | — | | — | | — | | 35 | 5 |
| SC Freiburg | 2022–23 | Bundesliga | 33 | 5 | 5 | 1 | — | | 7 | 1 | — | | 45 | 7 |
| SC Freiburg | 2023–24 | Bundesliga | 30 | 7 | 2 | 0 | — | | 10 | 2 | — | | 42 | 9 |
| SC Freiburg | 2024–25 | Bundesliga | 34 | 10 | 2 | 0 | — | | — | | — | | 36 | 10 |
| SC Freiburg | Total | | 97 | 22 | 9 | 1 | 0 | 0 | 17 | 3 | 0 | 0 | 123 | 26 |
| Eintracht Frankfurt | 2025–26 | Bundesliga | 31 | 5 | 2 | 2 | — | | 7 (Note: Appearances in UEFA Champions League) | 0 | — | | 40 | 7 |
| Eintracht Frankfurt | 2026–27 | Bundesliga | 7 | 0 | 1 | 0 | — | | — | | — | | 8 | 0 |
| Eintracht Frankfurt | Total | | 38 | 5 | 3 | 2 | — | | 7 | 0 | — | | 48 | 7 |
| Career total | | | 288 | 60 | 24 | 6 | 1 | 0 | 45 | 5 | 3 | 0 | 361 | 71 |

=== International ===
As of match played 14 November 2026

Appearances and goals by national team and year
| National team | Year | Apps | Goals |
|---|---|---|---|
| Japan | 2018 | 5 | 1 |
| Japan | 2019 | 13 | 2 |
| Japan | 2020 | 2 | 0 |
| Japan | 2021 | 1 | 0 |
| Japan | 2022 | 12 | 2 |
| Japan | 2023 | 8 | 2 |
| Japan | 2024 | 14 | 3 |
| Japan | 2025 | 7 | 1 |
| Japan | 2026 | 12 | 1 |
| Total | | 74 | 12 |

Scores and results list Japan's goal tally first, score column indicates score after each Dōan goal.

List of international goals scored by Ritsu Dōan
| No. | Date | Venue | Opponent | Score | Result | Competition |
|---|---|---|---|---|---|---|
| 1. | 16 October 2018 | Saitama Stadium 2002, Saitama, Japan | Uruguay | 3–2 | 4–3 | 2018 Kirin Challenge Cup |
| 2. | 9 January 2019 | Al Nahyan Stadium, Abu Dhabi, United Arab Emirates | Turkmenistan | 3–1 | 3–2 | 2019 AFC Asian Cup |
| 3. | 24 January 2019 | Al Maktoum Stadium, Dubai, United Arab Emirates | Vietnam | 1–0 | 1–0 | 2019 AFC Asian Cup |
| 4. | 23 November 2022 | Khalifa International Stadium, Al Rayyan, Qatar | Germany | 1–1 | 2–1 | 2022 FIFA World Cup |
| 5. | 1 December 2022 | Khalifa International Stadium, Al Rayyan, Qatar | Spain | 1–1 | 2–1 | 2022 FIFA World Cup |
| 6. | 15 June 2023 | Toyota Stadium, Toyota, Japan | El Salvador | 4–0 | 6–0 | 2023 Kirin Challenge Cup |
| 7. | 16 November 2023 | Suita City Football Stadium, Suita, Japan | Myanmar | 5–0 | 5–0 | 2026 FIFA World Cup qualification |
| 8. | 31 January 2024 | Al Thumama Stadium, Doha, Qatar | Bahrain | 1–0 | 3–1 | 2023 AFC Asian Cup |
| 9. | 6 June 2024 | Thuwunna Stadium, Yangon, Myanmar | Myanmar | 2–0 | 5–0 | 2026 FIFA World Cup qualification |
| 10. | 11 June 2024 | Edion Peace Wing Hiroshima, Hiroshima, Japan | Syria | 2–0 | 5–0 | 2026 FIFA World Cup qualification |
| 11. | 14 November 2025 | Toyota Stadium, Toyota, Japan | Ghana | 2–0 | 2–0 | 2025 Kirin Challenge Cup |
| 12. | 5 October 2026 | National Stadium, Tokyo, Japan | New Zealand | 2–1 | 2–1 | 2026 Kirin Cup Soccer |

== Honours ==
PSV

- KNVB Cup: 2021–22

Japan U19

- AFC U-19 Championship: 2016

Japan

- AFC Asian Cup runner-up: 2019

Individual

- AFC U-19 Championship Most Valuable Player: 2016
- AFC Youth Player of the Year: 2016
- Japan Pro-Footballers Association Best XI: 2022
- Bundesliga Fantasy Team of the Season: 2024–25
- IFFHS Asian Men's Team of the Year: 2025
