= Masaya Okugawa =

Japanese footballer

Masaya Okugawa 奥川 雅也
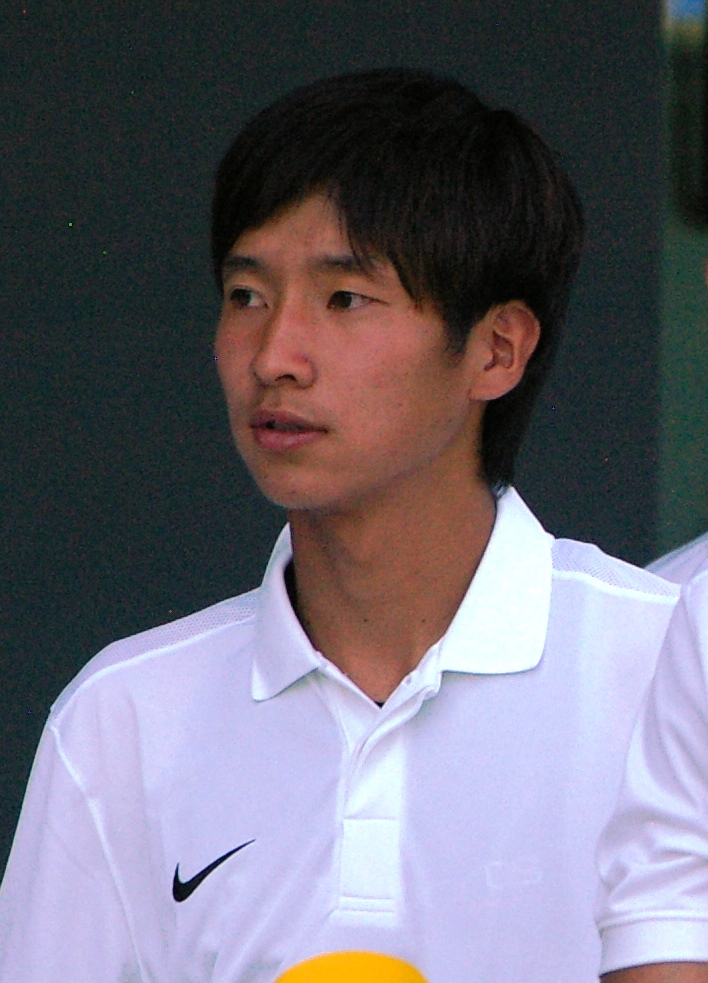
- Okugawa in 2015

Personal information
- Date of birth: 14 April 1996 (age 30)
- Place of birth: Koga, Shiga, Japan
- Height: 1.76 m (5 ft 9 in)
- Position: Midfielder

Team information
- Current team: Kyoto Sanga
- Number: 29

Youth career
- 2012–2014: Kyoto Sanga

Senior career*
Years	Team	Apps	(Gls)
2015	Kyoto Sanga	5	(1)
2015–2021	Red Bull Salzburg	30	(9)
2015–2017	→ FC Liefering (loan)	64	(8)
2017–2018	→ Mattersburg (loan)	27	(5)
2018–2019	→ Holstein Kiel (loan)	19	(5)
2021	→ Arminia Bielefeld (loan)	13	(1)
2021–2023	Arminia Bielefeld	63	(13)
2023–2025	FC Augsburg	2	(0)
2024	→ Hamburger SV (loan)	8	(0)
2024	FC Augsburg II	8	(1)
2025–	Kyoto Sanga	47	(8)

International career
2013	Japan U17		
2013–2014	Japan U20	3	(1)
- * Club domestic league appearances and goals as of 1 August 2026

Masaya Okugawa (奥川 雅也, Okugawa Masaya; born 14 April 1996) is a Japanese professional footballer who plays as a midfielder for Kyoto Sanga.

== Club career ==
=== Kyoto Sanga ===
Okugawa joined Kyoto Sanga's youth setup in 2009 from local youth side Ayano Boys Club. He progressed through the youth system of the Sanga and in September 2014, he signed a professional contract with them. He made his first team debut in the J2 League on 5 May 2015, in a 1–1 draw against Gifu, replacing Takumi Miyayoshi after 59 minutes.

=== Red Bull Salzburg ===
On 5 June 2015, Red Bull Salzburg announced the signing of Okugawa from Kyoto Sanga, for an undisclosed fee rumoured to be in the region of ¥100 million. He would be developed for the first team via FC Liefering.

On 31 August 2018, it was announced that Okugawa would join Holstein Kiel on loan until the end of 2018–19 season.

On 3 November 2020, Okugawa scored his first UEFA Champions League goal in a 6–2 defeat against Bayern Munich in the 2020–21 season.

Okugawa joined German club Arminia Bielefeld on loan for the remainder of the season on 31 January 2021. The deal contained an option to buy.

=== Arminia Bielefeld ===
On 26 July 2021, it was announced by Arminia Bielefeld that Okugawa has signed a permanent contract with the club until the summer of 2024. In his first season after signing, he scored in four Bundesliga matches in a row between matchdays 16 and 19.

=== FC Augsburg ===
On 5 July 2023, FC Augsburg announced that Okugawa signed a three-year contract with the club on a free transfer.

==== Loan to Hamburger SV ====
On 14 January 2024, Okugawa joined Hamburger SV in 2. Bundesliga on loan for the rest of the season.

=== Return to Kyoto Sanga ===
On 23 January 2025, Augsburg announced Okugawa's transfer to Kyoto Sanga.

== Career statistics ==
As of match played 5 May 2023

Club	Season	League			National Cup		Continental		Total	
Club	Season	Division	Apps	Goals	Apps	Goals	Apps	Goals	Apps	Goals
Kyoto Sanga	2015	J2 League	5	1	0	0	—		5	1
FC Liefering (loan)	2015–16	Erste Liga	30	3	—		—		30	3
FC Liefering (loan)	2016–17	Erste Liga	34	5	—		—		34	5
FC Liefering (loan)	Total		64	8	0	0	0	0	64	8
Mattersburg (loan)	2017–18	Austrian Bundesliga	27	5	3	3	—		30	8
Holstein Kiel (loan)	2018–19	2. Bundesliga	19	5	2	0	—		21	5
Red Bull Salzburg	2018–19	Austrian Bundesliga	0	0	0	0	0	0	0	0
Red Bull Salzburg	2019–20	Austrian Bundesliga	23	9	5	2	5 (Note: Four appearances in UEFA Champions League, one appearance in UEFA Europa League)	0	33	11
Red Bull Salzburg	2020–21	Austrian Bundesliga	7	0	2	1	5 (Note: Appearances in UEFA Champions League)	2	14	3
Red Bull Salzburg	Total		30	9	7	3	10	2	47	14
Arminia Bielefeld (loan)	2020–21	Bundesliga	13	1	0	0	—		13	1
Arminia Bielefeld	2021–22	Bundesliga	33	8	2	1	—		35	9
Arminia Bielefeld	2022–23	2. Bundesliga	30	5	2	1	—		32	6
Arminia Bielefeld	Total		76	14	4	2	0	0	80	16
FC Augsburg	2023–24	Bundesliga	0	0	0	0	—		0	0
Career total			221	42	16	8	10	2	247	52

== Honours ==
Red Bull Salzburg

- Austrian Bundesliga: 2019–20
- Austrian Cup: 2019–20
