= Amos Pieper =

German footballer (born 1998)

Personal information
- Full name: Amos Pieper
- Date of birth: 17 January 1998 (age 28)
- Place of birth: Lüdinghausen, Germany
- Height: 1.92 m (6 ft 4 in)
- Position: Centre-back

Team information
- Current team: Werder Bremen
- Number: 5

Youth career
- FC Nordkirchen
- –2010: Union Lüdinghausen
- 2010–2017: Borussia Dortmund

Senior career*
| Years | Team | Apps | (Gls) |
| 2017–2019 | Borussia Dortmund II | 34 | (1) |
| 2019–2022 | Arminia Bielefeld | 96 | (1) |
| 2022– | Werder Bremen | 86 | (2) |

International career
| 2015 | Germany U18 | 3 | (0) |
| 2020–2021 | Germany U21 | 10 | (0) |
| 2021 | Germany Olympic | 2 | (0) |
Medal record
Representing Germany
UEFA European Under-21 Championship
| Winner | 2021 |
- * Club domestic league appearances and goals as of 17:30, 31 October 2026 (UTC)

Amos Pieper (born 17 January 1998) is a German professional footballer who plays as a centre-back for Bundesliga club Werder Bremen.

== Career ==
On 28 January 2019, Pieper moved from Borussia Dortmund II to 2. Bundesliga club Arminia Bielefeld. He made his professional debut for Bielefeld in the 2. Bundesliga on 8 February 2019, coming on as a half-time substitute for Brian Behrendt in the 3–0 away win against Jahn Regensburg. In the 2021–22 season, he was relegated from the Bundesliga with Arminia Bielefeld.

In May 2022 it was announced that Pieper would join Werder Bremen, newly promoted to the Bundesliga, for the 2022–23 season. He moved on a free transfer.

== Career statistics ==
As of 31 October 2026

Appearances and goals by club, season and competition
| Club | Season | League | | | DFB-Pokal | | Other | | Total | | Ref. |
| Club | Season | Division | Apps | Goals | Apps | Goals | Apps | Goals | Apps | Goals | Ref. |
|---|---|---|---|---|---|---|---|---|---|---|---|
| Borussia Dortmund II | 2017–18 | Regionalliga West | 16 | 0 | – | | — | | 16 | 0 | |
| Borussia Dortmund II | 2018–19 | Regionalliga West | 18 | 1 | — | | — | | 18 | 1 | |
| Borussia Dortmund II | Total | | 34 | 1 | 0 | 0 | 0 | 0 | 34 | 1 | — |
| Arminia Bielefeld | 2018–19 | 2. Bundesliga | 8 | 0 | — | | — | | 8 | 0 | |
| Arminia Bielefeld | 2019–20 | 2. Bundesliga | 31 | 0 | 2 | 0 | — | | 33 | 0 | |
| Arminia Bielefeld | 2020–21 | Bundesliga | 30 | 1 | 1 | 0 | — | | 31 | 1 | |
| Arminia Bielefeld | 2021–22 | Bundesliga | 27 | 0 | 2 | 0 | — | | 29 | 0 | |
| Arminia Bielefeld | Total | | 96 | 1 | 5 | 0 | 0 | 0 | 101 | 1 | — |
| Werder Bremen | 2022–23 | Bundesliga | 29 | 2 | 2 | 0 | — | | 31 | 2 | |
| Werder Bremen | 2023–24 | Bundesliga | 7 | 0 | 1 | 0 | — | | 8 | 0 | |
| Werder Bremen | 2024–25 | Bundesliga | 23 | 0 | 1 | 0 | — | | 24 | 0 | |
| Werder Bremen | 2025–26 | Bundesliga | 19 | 0 | 0 | 0 | — | | 19 | 0 | |
| Werder Bremen | 2026–27 | Bundesliga | 8 | 0 | 2 | 0 | — | | 10 | 0 | |
| Werder Bremen | Total | | 86 | 2 | 6 | 0 | 0 | 0 | 92 | 2 | — |
| Career total | | | 216 | 4 | 11 | 0 | 0 | 0 | 227 | 4 | |

== Honours ==
Arminia Bielefeld

- 2. Bundesliga: 2019–20

Germany U21

- UEFA European Under-21 Championship: 2021
