= Mike van der Hoorn =

Dutch footballer (born 1992)

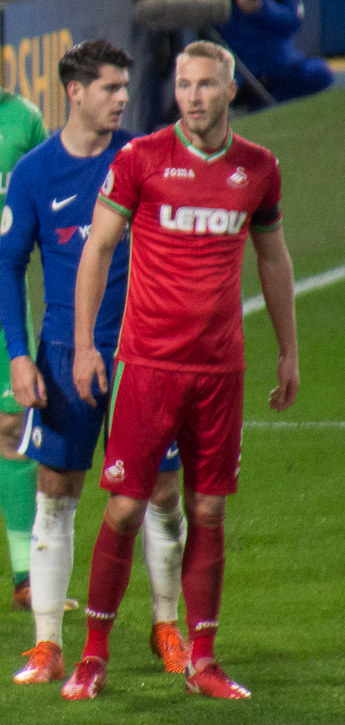
- Van der Hoorn (right) playing for Swansea City in 2017

Personal information
- Full name: Mike Adrianus Wilhelmus van der Hoorn
- Date of birth: 15 October 1992 (age 34)
- Place of birth: Almere, Netherlands
- Height: 1.90 m (6 ft 3 in)
- Position: Centre back

Team information
- Current team: AEK Larnaca
- Number: 3

Youth career
- 2000–2001: SC Buitenboys
- 2001–2006: Omniworld
- 2006–2010: Utrecht

Senior career*
| Years | Team | Apps | (Gls) |
| 2011–2013 | Utrecht | 48 | (6) |
| 2013–2016 | Ajax | 33 | (3) |
| 2013–2016 | Jong Ajax | 22 | (1) |
| 2016–2020 | Swansea City | 106 | (6) |
| 2020–2022 | Arminia Bielefeld | 23 | (0) |
| 2021–2022 | → Utrecht (loan) | 31 | (2) |
| 2022–2026 | Utrecht | 108 | (7) |
| 2026– | AEK Larnaca | 4 | (0) |

International career^{‡}
| 2012 | Netherlands U20 | 2 | (0) |
| 2013–2014 | Netherlands U21 | 13 | (1) |
- * Club domestic league appearances and goals as of 12 November 2026 ‡ National team caps and goals as of 13:44, 9 February 2025 (UTC)

Mike Adrianus Wilhelmus van der Hoorn (born 15 October 1992) is a Dutch professional footballer who plays as a centre back for the Cypriot First Division club AEK Larnaca. He made thirteen appearances for the Netherlands U-21 team.

== Club career ==
=== Utrecht ===
Van der Hoorn was born in Almere, Flevoland where he first joined local club SC Buitenboys, followed by FC Omniworld before being recruited into the youth ranks of FC Utrecht in 2006. He made his league debut for the first team on 15 May 2011, during the club's 2010–11 campaign, in a home match against AZ. The match ended in a 5–1 victory, with Van der Hoorn coming on as a substitute in the 77th minute for Mark van der Maarel. The following season saw Van der Hoorn appear in 12 league matches while scoring twice. His first two goals for Utrecht came in the same fixture. In a match against SBV Excelsior from Rotterdam on 30 March 2012. The match ended a 3–2 win at the Stadion Galgenwaard for Utrecht, with Van der Hoorn scoring in the 22' and in the 75th minute for his club.

The 2012–13 campaign saw Van der Hoorn breakthrough as he became the first choice centre back under head coach Jan Wouters, appearing in 31 Eredivisie matches and scoring four goals. He helped his side to 5th-place finish in the league table, qualifying for the UEFA Europa League through the Eredivisie Playoff rounds, where they beat SC Heerenveen 3–1 on aggregate, and FC Twente 3–2 on aggregate, thus qualifying for the UEFA Europa League qualifying rounds. That year Van der Hoorn was pronounced the FC Utrecht Player of the Year, winning the David Di Tommaso Trophy, receiving his award after the home match against Heracles Almelo on 12 May 2013. The trophy was awarded by none other than Audrey, David Di Tommaso's widow to a loud and warm applause from the audience. His teammates Robbin Ruiter and Jens Toornstra came in second and third place for the trophy that season.

=== Ajax ===
On 5 July 2013 it was announced that Van der Hoorn had transferred from Utrecht to Amsterdam for a reported fee of €3.8 million, signing a four-year contract binding him to Ajax until the Summer of 2017. He made his first appearance for Ajax on 13 July 2013, in a pre-season friendly encounter against RKC Waalwijk. The match ended in a 1–5 victory for Ajax, with Van der Hoorn playing the full second half of the match, having replaced Toby Alderweireld at half-time. He scored his first goal for his new club on 28 July 2013 in a pre-season friendly encounter against Willem II, scoring in the 22nd minute in the 3–1 win at the Sportpark De Toekomst. His first official match of the season for Ajax was against arch-rivals Feyenoord on the third match day of the season. Making his league debut for his new club in the Klassieker match in the Amsterdam Arena, Van der Hoorn came on in the 88th minute for Ruben Ligeon, with the match ending in a 2–1 win for the Amsterdammers.

=== Swansea City ===
In July 2016, Van der Hoorn joined Swansea City on a three-year deal for a fee rumored to be around £2 million. He was made to wait for his first appearance for the Swans, coming into the side for the 3–1 home defeat to Manchester City in late September. Van der Hoorn scored his first Swansea goal in a 3–1 defeat to Manchester United, heading in from a Gylfi Sigurðsson free kick.

Van der Hoorn's Swansea appearances continued to be sporadic throughout the rest of the season, before a change of manager in December 2017 saw him becoming a first team regular for the first time since his arrival in South Wales. He scored the second goal in the 4–1 win over West Ham in March 2018 as Swansea climbed out of the relegation zone.

In July 2019 Swansea opened contract negotiations with Van der Hoorn.

On 5 August 2020, Van der Hoorn was released by Swansea at the end of his contract, ending a four-year stay with the South Wales club.

=== Arminia Bielefeld ===
In September 2020, free agent Van der Hoorn joined Arminia Bielefeld, newly promoted to the Bundesliga, on a three-year contract.

=== Return to Utrecht ===
On 18 August 2021, Van der Hoorn returned to Utrecht. The transfer was structured as a loan for the 2021–22 season, with Van der Hoorn committing to a subsequent permanent transfer with a contract until 2024.

=== AEK Larnaca ===
On 23 June 2026, Van der Hoorn agreed to a two-season contract with AEK Larnaca in Cyprus.

== International career ==
Van der Hoorn made his debut for the Netherlands U-21 team on 5 February 2013, in a friendly match against Croatia U-21 which ended in a 3–2 win for the Dutch. With the national under-21 team qualifying for the 2013 UEFA European Under-21 Football Championship, Van der Hoorn was selected by head coach Cor Pot to play in the tournament. Van der Hoorn made two appearances during the tournament, which saw the Dutch eliminated in the semi-finals losing to Italy U-21.

On 6 March 2013, he received his first call up for the Netherlands national team from head coach Louis van Gaal, appearing in the team's preliminary squad ahead of their trip to Asia to play scheduled friendlies with China and Indonesia. Van der Hoorn however did not make the final squad for the trip, and has yet to make his debut for the Netherlands first team.

== Career statistics ==
As of match played 21 May 2026

Appearances and goals by club, season and competition
| Club | Season | League | | | National cup (Note: Includes KNVB Cup, FA Cup, DFB-Pokal) | | League cup (Note: Includes EFL Cup) | | Europe | | Other | | Total | |
| Club | Season | Division | Apps | Goals | Apps | Goals | Apps | Goals | Apps | Goals | Apps | Goals | Apps | Goals |
|---|---|---|---|---|---|---|---|---|---|---|---|---|---|---|
| Utrecht | 2010–11 | Eredivisie | 1 | 0 | 0 | 0 | — | | — | | — | | 1 | 0 |
| Utrecht | 2011–12 | Eredivisie | 12 | 2 | 0 | 0 | — | | — | | — | | 12 | 2 |
| Utrecht | 2012–13 | Eredivisie | 31 | 4 | 1 | 0 | — | | — | | 4 (Note: Appearance in Eredivisie European Competition play-offs) | 0 | 36 | 4 |
| Utrecht | Total | | 44 | 6 | 1 | 0 | — | | — | | 4 | 0 | 49 | 6 |
| Ajax | 2013–14 | Eredivisie | 3 | 0 | 1 | 0 | — | | 5 (Note: Four appearances in UEFA Champions League, one appearance in UEFA Europa League) | 0 | 0 | 0 | 9 | 0 |
| Ajax | 2014–15 | Eredivisie | 15 | 2 | 2 | 0 | — | | 4 (Note: One appearance in UEFA Champions League, three appearances and one goal in UEFA Europa League) | 1 | 1 (Note: Appearance in Johan Cruyff Shield) | 0 | 22 | 2 |
| Ajax | 2015–16 | Eredivisie | 15 | 1 | 2 | 0 | — | | 1 (Note: Appearances in UEFA Europa League) | 0 | 0 | 0 | 18 | 1 |
| Ajax | Total | | 33 | 2 | 4 | 0 | — | | 10 | 1 | 1 | 0 | 48 | 3 |
| Jong Ajax | 2013–14 | Eerste Divisie | 12 | 0 | — | | — | | — | | — | | 12 | 0 |
| Jong Ajax | 2014–15 | Eerste Divisie | 6 | 0 | — | | — | | — | | — | | 6 | 0 |
| Jong Ajax | 2015–16 | Eerste Divisie | 4 | 1 | — | | — | | — | | — | | 4 | 1 |
| Jong Ajax | Total | | 22 | 1 | — | | — | | — | | — | | 22 | 1 |
| Swansea City | 2016–17 | Premier League | 8 | 1 | 1 | 0 | 3 | 0 | — | | — | | 11 | 1 |
| Swansea City | 2017–18 | Premier League | 24 | 1 | 6 | 0 | 3 | 0 | — | | — | | 33 | 1 |
| Swansea City | 2018–19 | Championship | 46 | 3 | 4 | 0 | 0 | 0 | — | | — | | 50 | 3 |
| Swansea City | 2019–20 | Championship | 28 | 1 | 0 | 0 | 1 | 0 | — | | 2 (Note: Appearances in EFL Championship play-offs) | 0 | 31 | 1 |
| Swansea City | Total | | 106 | 6 | 11 | 0 | 6 | 0 | — | | 2 | 0 | 125 | 6 |
| Arminia Bielefeld | 2020–21 | Bundesliga | 22 | 0 | 0 | 0 | — | | — | | — | | 22 | 0 |
| Arminia Bielefeld | 2021–22 | Bundesliga | 1 | 0 | 1 | 0 | — | | — | | — | | 2 | 0 |
| Arminia Bielefeld | Total | | 23 | 0 | 1 | 0 | — | | — | | — | | 24 | 0 |
| Utrecht (loan) | 2021–22 | Eredivisie | 31 | 1 | 1 | 1 | — | | — | | 2 (Note: Appearances in European playoffs) | 0 | 34 | 2 |
| Utrecht | 2022–23 | Eredivisie | 25 | 1 | 3 | 0 | — | | — | | 1 | 0 | 29 | 1 |
| Utrecht | 2023–24 | Eredivisie | 21 | 1 | 1 | 0 | — | | — | | 1 | 0 | 23 | 1 |
| Utrecht | 2024–25 | Eredivisie | 31 | 3 | 3 | 0 | — | | — | | — | | 34 | 3 |
| Utrecht | 2025–26 | Eredivisie | 29 | 2 | 2 | 0 | — | | 13 | 1 | 1 (Note: Appearance in European play-offs) | 1 | 45 | 4 |
| Utrecht | Total | | 108 | 7 | 9 | 0 | — | | 13 | 1 | 3 | 1 | 133 | 9 |
| Career total | | | 364 | 23 | 27 | 1 | 6 | 0 | 23 | 2 | 12 | 1 | 433 | 27 |

== Honours ==
Ajax

- Eredivisie: 2013–14

The Netherlands U21

- UEFA European Under-21 Championship bronze: 2013

Individual

- David Di Tommaso Trophy: 2012–13
