= Sergio Córdova =

Venezuelan footballer (born 1997)

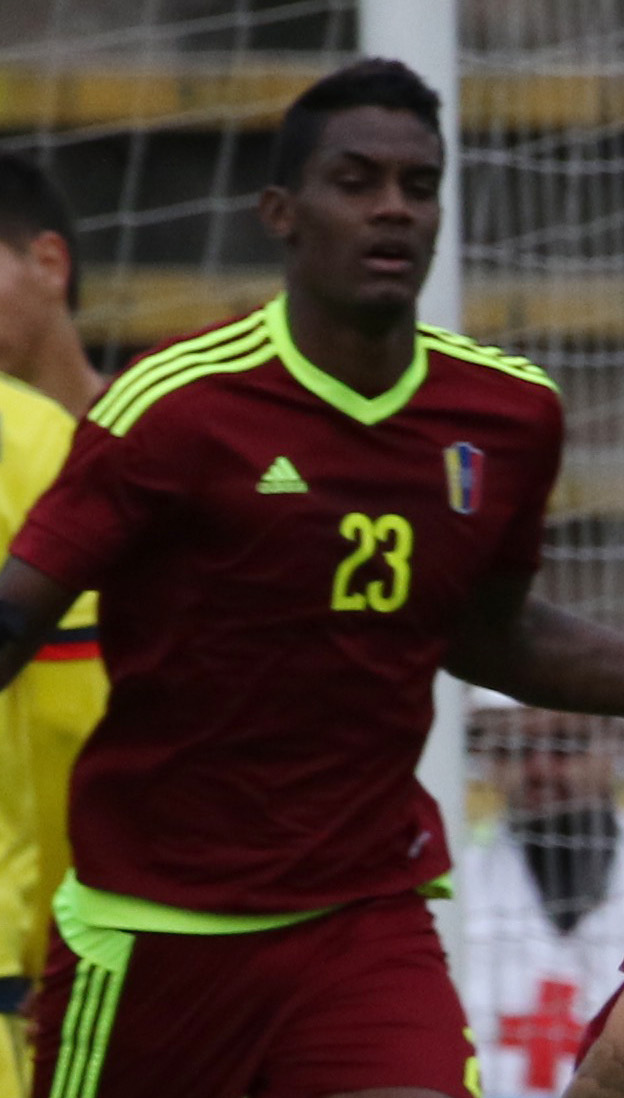
- Córdova with Venezuela U20 in 2017

Personal information
- Full name: Sergio Duvan Córdova Lezama
- Date of birth: 9 August 1997 (age 29)
- Place of birth: Calabozo, Venezuela
- Height: 1.88 m (6 ft 2 in)
- Positions: Striker; winger

Team information
- Current team: Batman Petrolspor (on loan from Young Boys)
- Number: 9

Youth career
- 2013–2015: Caracas

Senior career*
Years	Team	Apps	(Gls)
2015–2017	Caracas	36	(4)
2017–2023	FC Augsburg	75	(7)
2020–2021	→ Arminia Bielefeld (loan)	23	(2)
2022	→ Real Salt Lake (loan)	33	(9)
2023	Vancouver Whitecaps FC	19	(2)
2023–2025	Alanyaspor	53	(12)
2024	→ Sochi (loan)	10	(0)
2025–	Young Boys	21	(2)
2026	→ St. Louis City (loan)	10	(1)
2026–	→ Batman Petrolspor (loan)	8	(1)

International career^{‡}
2017	Venezuela U20	17	(5)
2019	Venezuela U23	1	(0)
2017–	Venezuela	19	(0)
Medal record
Men's football
Representing Venezuela
FIFA U-20 World Cup
Runner-up	2017
South American U-20 Championship
Third place	2017
- * Club domestic league appearances and goals as of 18 October 2026 ‡ National team caps and goals as of 21:24, 27 January 2022 (UTC)

Sergio Duvan Córdova Lezama (born 9 August 1997), known as Sergio Córdova (Spanish pronunciation: [ˈseɾxjo ˈkoɾðoβa]), is a Venezuelan professional footballer who plays as a forward for Turkish TFF 1. Lig club Batman Petrolspor on loan from Swiss club Young Boys. He also represents the Venezuela national team.

Córdova is an academy graduate of Venezuelan side Caracas and scored on his professional debut in 2015. He spent two and a half season's in the club's first team, scoring five goals in 38 appearances, before signing for Augsburg in 2017. Internationally, he represented Venezuela at U20 level and featured for the nation at the South American Youth Football Championship and U-20 World Cup in 2017, winning the Goal of the Tournament award at the latter competition. Later that year, he made his debut for the senior side.

== Club career ==
=== Caracas ===
Having previously represented the club at youth level following his arrival in 2013, Córdova made a goal scoring debut for Caracas on 12 July 2015, starting and scoring the opening goal in a 4–0 league victory over Tucanes. He repeated the feat in his Copa Venezuela debut the following month when he broke the deadlock in the 78th minute of a 3–0 win over second division side Petroleros de Anzoátegui. On 31 October, he became the youngest ever player to score a Primera División brace for the club when he scored twice in a 3–1 win over Metropolitanos. He ended his debut season having amassed 13 appearances across all competitions with a return of four goals.

In the following year's campaign, Córdova was marred by injury and had to undergo surgery after breaking the fifth metatarsal in his left foot. Despite the injury, he managed to make 20 appearances as Caracas ended fourth in the Venezuelan Primera División, thereby qualifying for the 2017 Copa Sudamericana. He made only four more appearances for the club, taking his overall tally to 38 with a return of five goals, before being signed by FC Augsburg following his impressive form with Venezuela at the FIFA U-20 World Cup.

=== FC Augsburg ===
On the evening of 4 July 2017, Córdova completed a transfer to German Bundesliga side Augsburg for a reported fee of €1m, signing a five-year contract with the club. He made his debut on 13 August, coming on as a second–half substitute for fellow debutante Marcel Heller in a 2–0 DFB Pokal loss to third division side Magdeburg. He scored his first goal for the club on 26 August, netting an 89th-minute equalizer from an assist by Heller in a 2–2 draw with Borussia Mönchengladbach. In October, whilst on international duty with Venezuela, Córdova suffered a fractured ankle and torn ligaments which him ruled out for part of the Hinrunde. He made his first Bundesliga start for the club the following year, starting in a 1–0 win over Hamburg on 13 January.

==== Loan to Arminia Bielefeld ====
On 17 August 2020, he signed a five-year contract extension with Augsburg before joining newly promoted Bundesliga side Arminia Bielefeld on a season-long loan.

==== Loan to Real Salt Lake ====
On 3 February 2022, it was announced Córdova had joined Major League Soccer side Real Salt Lake on a season-long loan.

=== Vancouver Whitecaps FC ===
On 20 February 2023, Córdova returned to Major League Soccer, signing as a designated player with Canadian side Vancouver Whitecaps FC on a 3-year deal.

=== Alanyaspor ===
On September 15, 2023, it was announced that Córdova had been transferred to Turkish Süper Lig side Alanyaspor for an undisclosed fee.

==== Loan to Sochi ====
On 5 February 2024, Córdova joined Russian Premier League club Sochi on loan, with an option to buy.

=== Young Boys ===
On 31 July 2025, It was announced that Córdova had signed a contract with Swiss Super League side Young Boys until 2029.

=== St. Louis City ===
On 24 February 2026, Córdova joined MLS club St. Louis City SC on loan on a Designated Player contract through June 2026 with an option to buy.

== International career ==
=== Youth ===
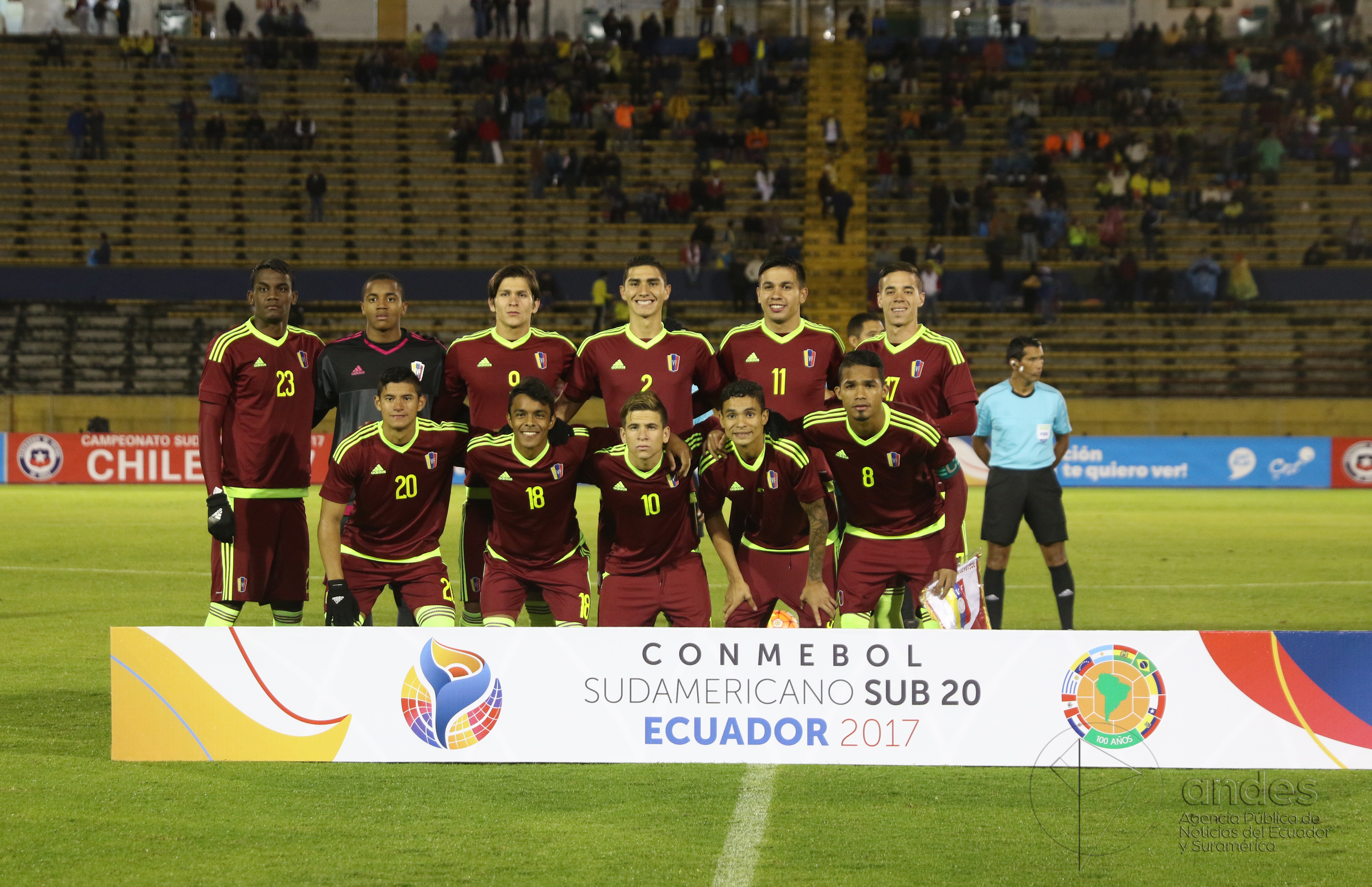
Córdova (far left) at the 2017 South American U-20 Championship.

Córdova has represented Venezuela at U20 level and featured at the 2016 Copa de los Andes tournament held in Peru. He scored twice in a 5–1 win over Paraguay which saw Venezuela claim the gold medal, and was named Player of the Tournament, with teammate Ronaldo Peña claiming the top goalscorer award. In February 2017, Córdova took part in the U20 Campeonato Sudamericano with the Venezuela squad. He scored once during the course of the tournament, in a 4–2 win over Ecuador, as Venezuela qualified for the 2017 FIFA U-20 World Cup in South Korea by securing a third-place finish.

The World Cup took place in May the same year and he opened his account with the second goal in a 2–0 win over Germany in the tournament's opening match. Three days later, he added two goals to his tally when he netted a brace in a 7–0 victory over Vanuatu which saw Venezuela become the first team to qualify for the knockout stages of the competition. Córdova scored again in a 1–0 win over Mexico on 26 May which helped Venezuela progress from their group without losing or conceding. His four goals saw him end as the tournament's joint-second top goal scorer alongside Fashion Sakala, Dominic Solanke, Jean-Kévin Augustin and Joshua Sargent, and one behind Golden Boot winner Riccardo Orsolini, as Venezuela were ultimately beaten by England in the final. Córdova's goal against Mexico in the group stages was also voted Goal of the Tournament.

=== Senior ===
Córdova received his first call-up to the senior side on 25 August 2017 when he was named in Rafael Dudamel's squad for World Cup qualifiers against Colombia and Argentina. He made his debut on 31 August against the former, starting in a 0–0 draw before registering his first senior assist in a 1–1 draw with the latter on 5 September.

== Personal life ==
Córdova is a practicing Christian and, during a 2018 interview, revealed that his faith in God had helped him overcome the early challenges he faced with the language and cold weather during his time in Germany.

== Career statistics ==
=== Club ===
As of match played 11 February 2026.

Appearances and goals by club, season and competition
Club	Season	League			National cup (Note: Includes Copa Venezuela and DFB Pokal matches)		Continental		Other		Total	
Club	Season	League	Apps	Goals	Apps	Goals	Apps	Goals	Apps	Goals	Apps	Goals
Caracas	2015	Primera División	12	3	1	1	0	0	0	0	13	4
Caracas	2016	Primera División	20	1	0	0	0	0	0	0	20	1
Caracas	2017	Primera División	4	0	0	0	1 (Note: Appearance in Copa Sudamericana)	0	–		5	0
Caracas	Total		36	4	1	1	1	0	0	0	38	5
FC Augsburg	2017–18	Bundesliga	26	2	1	0	–		–		27	2
FC Augsburg	2018–19	Bundesliga	20	3	2	0	–		–		22	3
FC Augsburg	2019–20	Bundesliga	16	2	0	0	–		–		16	2
FC Augsburg	2021–22	Bundesliga	13	0	1	0	–		–		14	0
FC Augsburg	Total		75	7	4	0	–		—		79	7
Arminia Bielefeld (loan)	2020–21	Bundesliga	23	2	0	0	–		–		23	2
Real Salt Lake (loan)	2022	MLS	33	9	1	0	–		1 (Note: Appearances in MLS Cup Playoffs)	2	35	11
Vancouver Whitecaps	2023	MLS	19	2	0	0	2 (Note: Appearances in CONCACAF Champions Cup)	0	5 (Note: Appearances in Canadian Soccer Championship and Leagues Cup)	2	26	4
Alanyaspor	2023–24	Süper Lig	18	3	3	0	–		–		21	3
Sochi (loan)	2023–24	Russian Premier League	10	0	1	0	–		–		11	0
Young Boys	2025-26	Swiss Super League	21	2	2	0	10 (Note: Appearances in UEFA Europa League)	0	–		33	2
Career total			235	29	12	1	14	2	5	2	266	37

=== International ===
As of match played 7 October 2021.

National team	Year	Apps	Goals
Venezuela	2017	4	0
Venezuela	2018	4	0
Venezuela	2020	2	0
Venezuela	2021	5	0
Total		15	0

== Honours ==
Vancouver Whitecaps FC

- Canadian Championship: 2023

Venezuela U20

- U-20 Copa de los Andes: 2016
- FIFA U-20 World Cup runner-up: 2017
- South American Youth Football Championship third place: 2017

Individual

- 2016 Copa de los Andes: Player of the Tournament
- FIFA U-20 World Cup 2017 Goal of the Tournament: 1–0 (1–0) vs. Mexico

Records

- Youngest player to score a Primera División brace (with Caracas FC): 18 years, 2 months and 22 days
