= Nikolai Rehnen =

German footballer

Personal information
- Date of birth: 4 February 1997 (age 29)
- Place of birth: Cologne, Germany
- Height: 1.91 m (6 ft 3 in)
- Position: Goalkeeper

Team information
- Current team: SV Sandhausen
- Number: 1

Youth career
- SpVg Steinhagen
- 2007–2015: Arminia Bielefeld

Senior career*
Years	Team	Apps	(Gls)
2015–2021	Arminia Bielefeld	0	(0)
2015–2017	Arminia Bielefeld II	41	(0)
2018–2019	→ Fortuna Köln (loan)	37	(0)
2019–2020	→ Alemannia Aachen (loan)	0	(0)
2021–	SV Sandhausen	50	(0)

International career
2016–2017	Germany U20	2	(0)
- * Club domestic league appearances and goals as of 24 May 2025

Nikolai Rehnen (born 4 February 1997) is a German professional footballer who plays as a goalkeeper for 3. Liga side SV Sandhausen.
