= Can Özkan =

German footballer

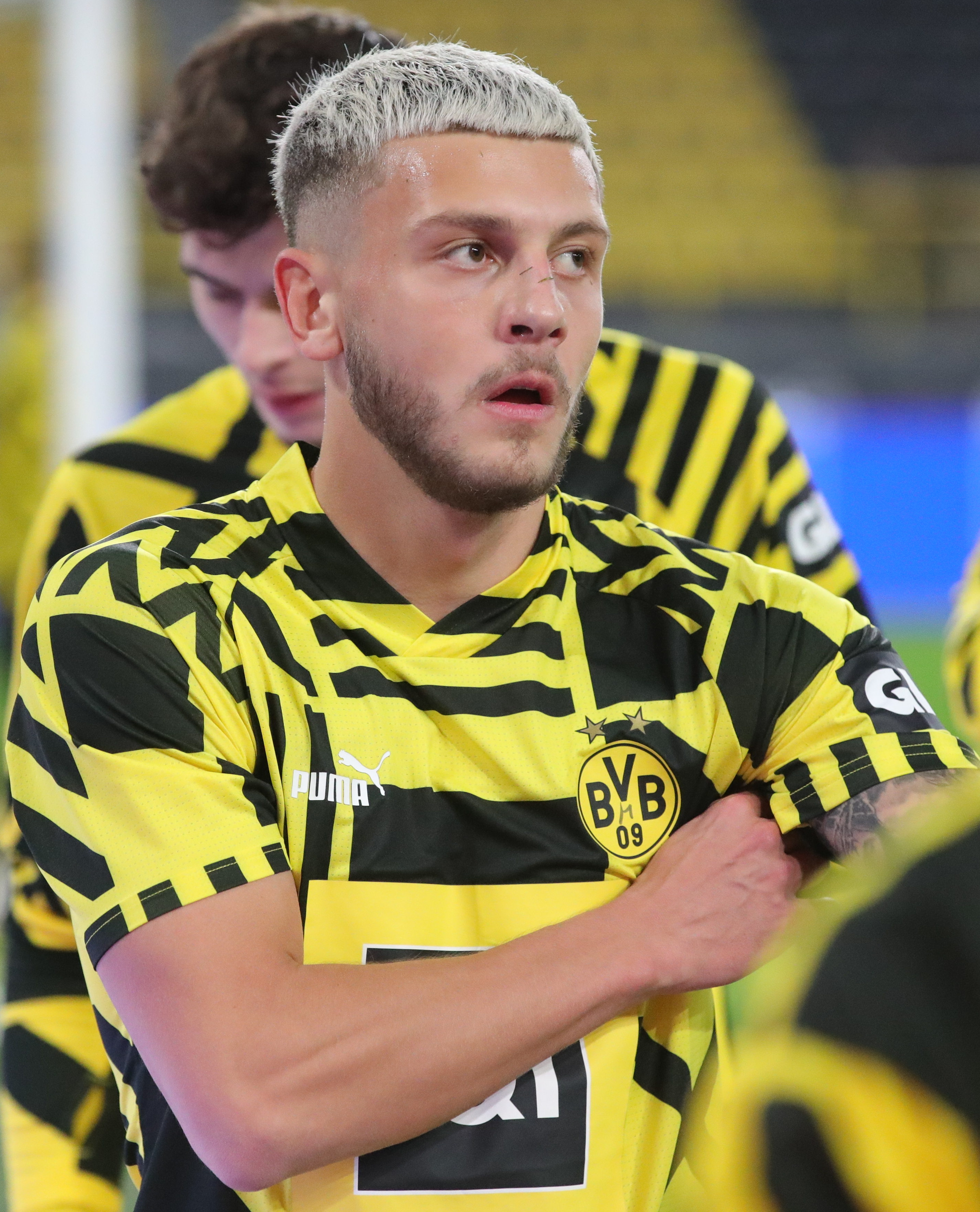
- Özkan in 2022

Personal information
- Full name: Can Hayri Özkan
- Date of birth: 2 December 1999 (age 26)
- Place of birth: Bielefeld, Germany
- Height: 1.82 m (6 ft 0 in)
- Position: Right-back

Youth career
- –2012: VfL Theesen
- 2012–: Arminia Bielefeld

Senior career*
Years	Team	Apps	(Gls)
2018–2021	Arminia Bielefeld	2	(0)
2019–2020	→ Alemannia Aachen (loan)	10	(0)
2020–2021	→ Næstved BK (loan)	0	(0)
2021–2022	Fortuna Düsseldorf II	27	(0)
2022–2023	Borussia Dortmund II	28	(1)
2023–2024	Arminia Bielefeld	21	(0)
2024–2026	Erzgebirge Aue	1	(0)
Total		89	(1)
- * Club domestic league appearances and goals

Can Hayri Özkan (born 2 December 1999) is a former German professional footballer who played as a right-back.
