= Joakim Nilsson (footballer, born 1994) =

Swedish footballer

Personal information
- Full name: Jörgen Joakim Nilsson
- Date of birth: 6 February 1994 (age 32)
- Place of birth: Härnösand, Sweden
- Height: 1.85 m (6 ft 1 in)
- Position: Centre-back

Youth career
- –2009: IF Älgarna
- 2011–2012: GIF Sundsvall

Senior career*
Years	Team	Apps	(Gls)
2009–2010	IF Älgarna	19	(0)
2012–2015	GIF Sundsvall	30	(2)
2016–2019	IF Elfsborg	84	(5)
2019–2022	Arminia Bielefeld	85	(3)
2023	St. Louis City 2	2	(2)
2023–2025	St. Louis City SC	33	(1)
Total		253	(13)

International career
2013	Sweden U19	6	(0)
2015–2017	Sweden U21/O	11	(0)
2016–2022	Sweden	14	(0)
- * Club domestic league appearances and goals

Jörgen Joakim Nilsson (born 6 February 1994) is a Swedish former professional footballer who played as a centre-back.

== Career ==
In November 2012 Nilsson was handed his first professional contract by GIF Sundsvall.

In February 2016 he signed a five-year contract with IF Elfsborg for a fee around €500,000 (5 million SEK).

In July 2019, Nilsson joined 2. Bundesliga side Arminia Bielefeld having agreed a three-year contract. The transfer fee paid to Elfsborg was estimated at €400,000.

In June 2022, Nilsson agreed to a free transfer to St. Louis City SC. He joined the club in July 2022 and the club itself will begin playing in the MLS in 2023.

On August 5 2025, St. Louis announce that they're part away with Joakim Nilsson. After three seasons injury.

== Personal life ==
He is younger brother to the former Sweden national team player Per Nilsson.

== Career statistics ==
=== International ===
Appearances and goals by national team and year
National team	Year	Apps	Goals
Sweden	2016	1	0
Sweden	2017	2	0
Sweden	2018	1	0
Sweden	2019	0	0
Sweden	2020	0	0
Sweden	2021	6	0
Sweden	2022	4	0
Total		14	0

== Honors ==
St. Louis City SC

- Western Conference (regular season): 2023
