= Fabian Kunze =

German footballer

Personal information
- Date of birth: 14 June 1998 (age 28)
- Place of birth: Bielefeld, Germany
- Height: 1.90 m (6 ft 3 in)
- Position: Midfielder

Team information
- Current team: 1. FC Kaiserslautern
- Number: 6

Youth career
- 2008–2014: VfL Theesen
- 2014–2015: Schalke 04
- 2015–2016: SV Rödinghausen

Senior career*
Years	Team	Apps	(Gls)
2016–2019	SV Rödinghausen	105	(3)
2019–2022	Arminia Bielefeld	63	(0)
2022–2025	Hannover 96	92	(2)
2025–	1. FC Kaiserslautern	31	(0)
- * Club domestic league appearances and goals as of 18 May 2026

Fabian Kunze (born 14 June 1998) is a German professional footballer who plays as a midfielder for 1. FC Kaiserslautern.

== Personal life ==
He is the twin brother of fellow professional footballer Lukas Kunze, who plays in the 3. Liga for Arminia Bielefeld.
