= Manuel Prietl =

Austrian footballer

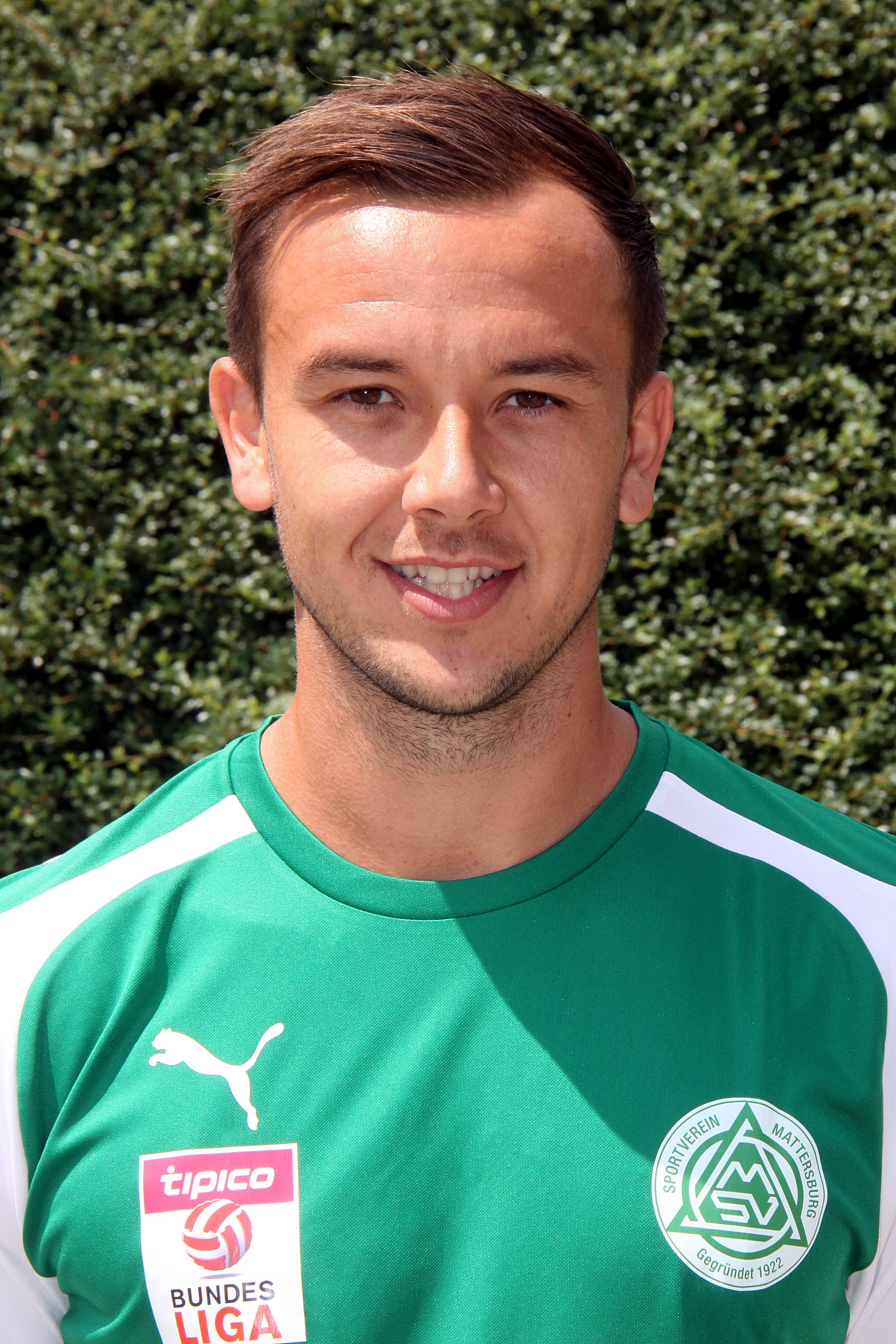
- Prietl with SV Mattersburg in 2015

Personal information
- Date of birth: 3 August 1991 (age 35)
- Place of birth: Deutschlandsberg, Austria
- Height: 1.87 m (6 ft 2 in)
- Position: Midfielder

Team information
- Current team: TSV Hartberg II (assistant coach)

Senior career*
Years	Team	Apps	(Gls)
2007–2011	SV Gleinstätten	71	(10)
2011–2012	TSV Hartberg	33	(0)
2012–2016	SV Mattersburg	112	(2)
2016–2023	Arminia Bielefeld	195	(7)
2023–2024	Rheindorf Altach	3	(0)

International career
2012	Austria U21	2	(0)

Managerial career
- 2024–: TSV Hartberg II (assistant)
- * Club domestic league appearances and goals

Manuel Prietl (born 3 August 1991) is an Austrian professional football coach and a former player. He is an assistant coach with TSV Hartberg II.

== Club career ==
Prietl joined Arminia Bielefeld in summer 2016. In December 2017, he agreed a contract extension until 2021 with the club.

On 2 October 2023, after his contract with Arminia had expired at the end of the 2022–23 season, Prietl returned to his homeland, signing a one-year deal with Austrian Football Bundesliga club Rheindorf Altach.

== International career ==
Prietl is a youth international having played for the Austria U21 national team.
