= Noel Niemann =

German footballer

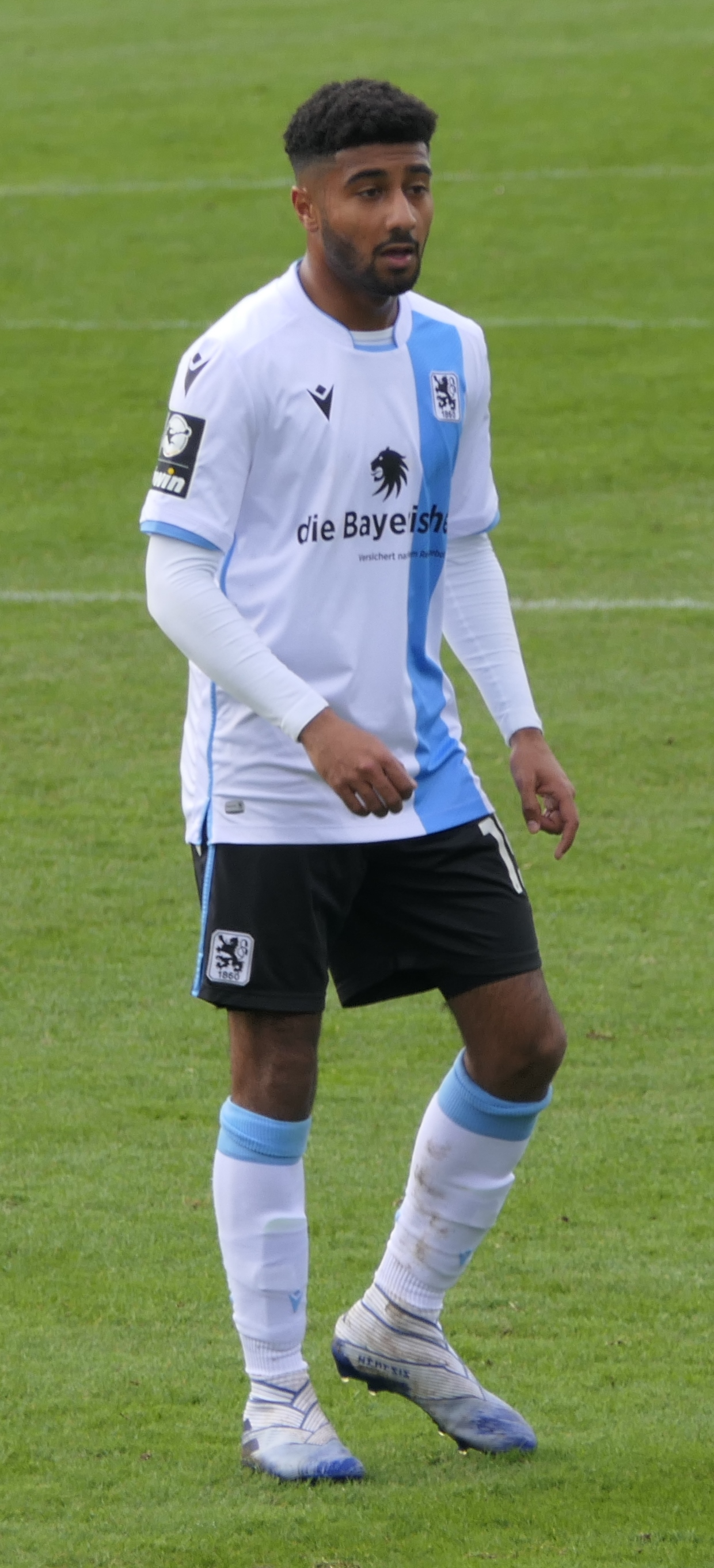
- Niemann with 1860 Munich in 2020

Personal information
- Date of birth: 14 November 1999 (age 27)
- Place of birth: Munich, Germany
- Height: 1.71 m (5 ft 7 in)
- Position: Right winger

Team information
- Current team: GKS Tychy
- Number: 7

Youth career
- SV 1880 München
- –2016: FC Ismaning
- 2016–2017: FC Memmingen

Senior career*
| Years | Team | Apps | (Gls) |
| 2017–2018 | 1860 Munich II | 24 | (5) |
| 2018–2020 | 1860 Munich | 13 | (2) |
| 2020–2022 | Arminia Bielefeld | 1 | (0) |
| 2021 | → Türkgücü München (loan) | 14 | (2) |
| 2021–2022 | → TSV Hartberg (loan) | 29 | (4) |
| 2022–2024 | VfL Osnabrück | 59 | (2) |
| 2024–2025 | Iğdır | 7 | (0) |
| 2025–2026 | GKS Tychy | 15 | (3) |
| 2026– | GKS Tychy | 0 | (0) |
- * Club domestic league appearances and goals as of 15:41, 26 May 2026 (UTC)

Noel Niemann (born 14 November 1999) is a German professional footballer who plays as a right winger for II liga club GKS Tychy.

== Career ==
Born in Munich, Niemann started playing football with local SV 1880 München. In June 2020, Munich-based blog sechzger.de reported Niemann would not renew his expiring contract at 3. Liga club 1860 Munich and had instead signed for Arminia Bielefeld, who at the time were leading the table of the 2. Bundesliga. In July 2020, Arminia confirmed the move, with Niemann signing a contract until summer 2024.

On 30 August 2022, Niemann signed with VfL Osnabrück.

== Personal life ==
Niemann was born in Germany and is of Afghan and Liberian descent.
