= Jacob Barrett Laursen =

Danish footballer (born 1994)

Jacob Laursen
Personal information
- Full name: Jacob Barrett Laursen
- Date of birth: 17 November 1994 (age 31)
- Place of birth: Arden, Denmark
- Height: 1.80 m (5 ft 11 in)
- Position: Left-back

Youth career
- –2012: AaB
- 2012–2014: Juventus

Senior career*
Years	Team	Apps	(Gls)
2013–2014	Juventus	0	(0)
2013–2014	→ OB (loan)	6	(0)
2014–2020	OB	112	(8)
2020–2022	Arminia Bielefeld	41	(2)
2022–2023	Standard Liège	22	(0)
2023–2025	BK Häcken	27	(0)
Total		208	(10)

International career
2010	Denmark U16	1	(0)
2011	Denmark U17	4	(0)
2012	Denmark U18	6	(0)
2013	Denmark U19	1	(0)
2013	Denmark U20	3	(0)
2016	Denmark U21	1	(0)
- * Club domestic league appearances and goals

Jacob Barrett Laursen (born 17 November 1994) is a Danish former professional footballer who played as a left-back.

== Club career ==
Juventus signed Laursen in 2012 for €1 million from Aalborg BK. After spending one season in Juventus Primavera team without playing for the first team, Laursen joined Danish side OB on loan for the 2013–14 season. He made his competitive debut at 10 November 2013 in a 3–1 home defeat against FC Vestsjælland. He appeared as a 65th-minute substitute.

On 3 July 2014, Laursen joined Odense Boldklub permanently, originally signing a three-year deal.

During his six seasons with the club, their highest finish was fifth in 2018-19. Having finished third in the regular season, Odense fell back in the title play-offs, missing out on Europe. Laursen would not get to play European competition at all during his time there, but was selected for the Danish squad for the 2016 Olympics in Rio, losing 2–0 to Nigeria in the quarter-finals.

In June 2020, it was announced Laursen would join Arminia Bielefeld, newly promoted to the Bundesliga, on a three-year contract.

After two seasons Arminia were relegated, leading to Laursen moving to Ronny Deila-coached Standard Liège in Belgium on 23 July 2022 with a contract for three years with an option for a fourth year. He left the club on 21 August 2023 to join Swedish side BK Häcken.

In March 2026, Barrett Laursen decided to retire, due to injuries.
