= Nathan de Medina =

Belgian footballer

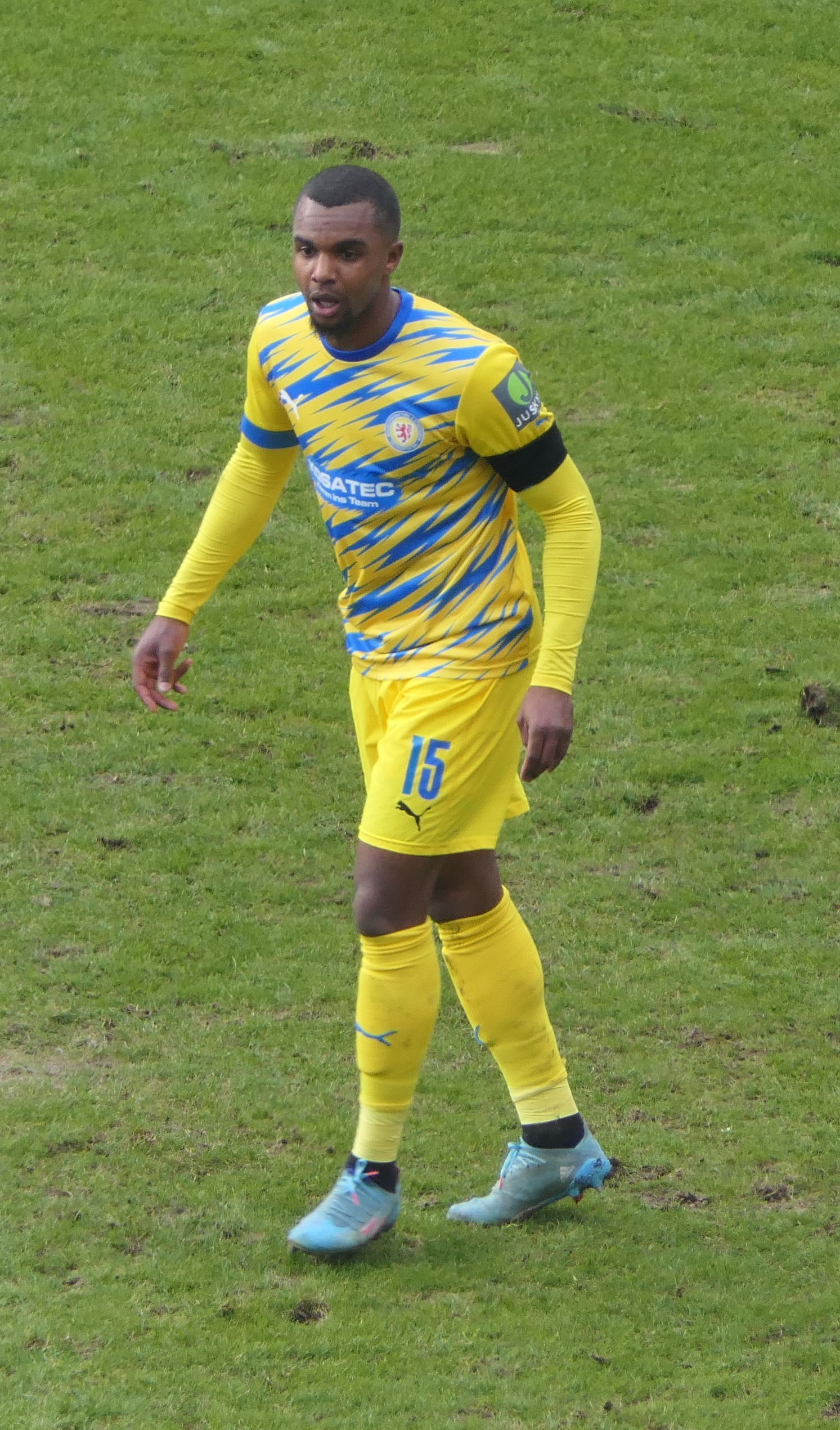
- De Medina with Eintracht Braunschweig in 2023

Personal information
- Date of birth: 8 October 1997 (age 29)
- Place of birth: Mouscron, Belgium
- Height: 1.80 m (5 ft 11 in)
- Position: Defender

Team information
- Current team: Würzburger Kickers
- Number: 4

Youth career
- Anderlecht

Senior career*
Years	Team	Apps	(Gls)
2016–2017	Anderlecht	2	(0)
2016–2017	→ OH Leuven (loan)	17	(0)
2017–2020	Mouscron	39	(3)
2020–2022	Arminia Bielefeld	36	(0)
2022–2023	Eintracht Braunschweig	17	(0)
2023–2025	Partizan	0	(0)
2026	Olympic Charleroi	10	(1)
2026–	Würzburger Kickers	0	(0)

International career^{‡}
2016	Belgium U19	3	(0)
2017	Belgium U21	1	(0)
- * Club domestic league appearances and goals as of 20 April 2026 ‡ National team caps and goals as of 22 May 2024

Nathan de Medina (born 8 October 1997) is a Belgian professional footballer who plays as a defender for German 3. Liga club Würzburger Kickers.

== Club career ==
=== Early career and Anderlecht ===
De Medina joined the youth academy of Anderlecht in 2004. He was a key part of the squad that reached the semi-finals of the UEFA Youth League in 2015 and 2016. He made his senior professional debut for Anderlecht on 19 May 2016 in a 5–2 away defeat against Genk. To gain first-team experience, he was loaned to OH Leuven for the 2016–17 season, where he made 15 league appearances.

=== Mouscron ===
In August 2017, De Medina moved to Mouscron. He spent three seasons with the club, establishing himself as a reliable top-flight defender. One of his highlights during this period was scoring twice against Antwerp in a 2–2 draw on 29 October 2017.

=== Bundesliga and 2. Bundesliga ===
In July 2020, De Medina signed a three-year contract with Arminia Bielefeld, newly promoted to the German Bundesliga. He made 35 appearances in the German top flight over two seasons. He was sent off for a reckless challenge on Niclas Füllkrug in a 2–0 loss to Werder Bremen in March 2021.

Following Bielefeld's relegation, he transferred to Eintracht Braunschweig in the 2. Bundesliga in September 2022, contributing 17 league appearances during the 2022–23 season.

=== Partizan Belgrade ===
On 13 September 2023, De Medina joined Serbian side Partizan on a free transfer. His tenure in Belgrade was difficult; he later described it as the "worst chapter" of his career due to administrative issues, injuries (including a serious eye injury caused by his own dog), and disputes over unpaid wages. While he featured in qualifying rounds for the Champions League and Conference League, he made zero appearances in the Serbian domestic league.

=== Olympic Charleroi ===
On 30 January 2026, after six months as a free agent following his departure from Partizan, De Medina returned to Belgium to sign with Olympic Charleroi in the Challenger Pro League. He made his debut for the club on 7 February 2026, starting as a centre-back against Lokeren.

=== Würzburger Kickers ===
On 11 July 2026, De Medina signed with Würzburger Kickers in German 3. Liga, reuniting with Michael Schiele, who previously coached De Medina at Eintracht Braunschweig.

== Personal life ==
De Medina was born in Belgium and is of Cape Verdean descent.
