= Christian Gebauer =

Austrian footballer

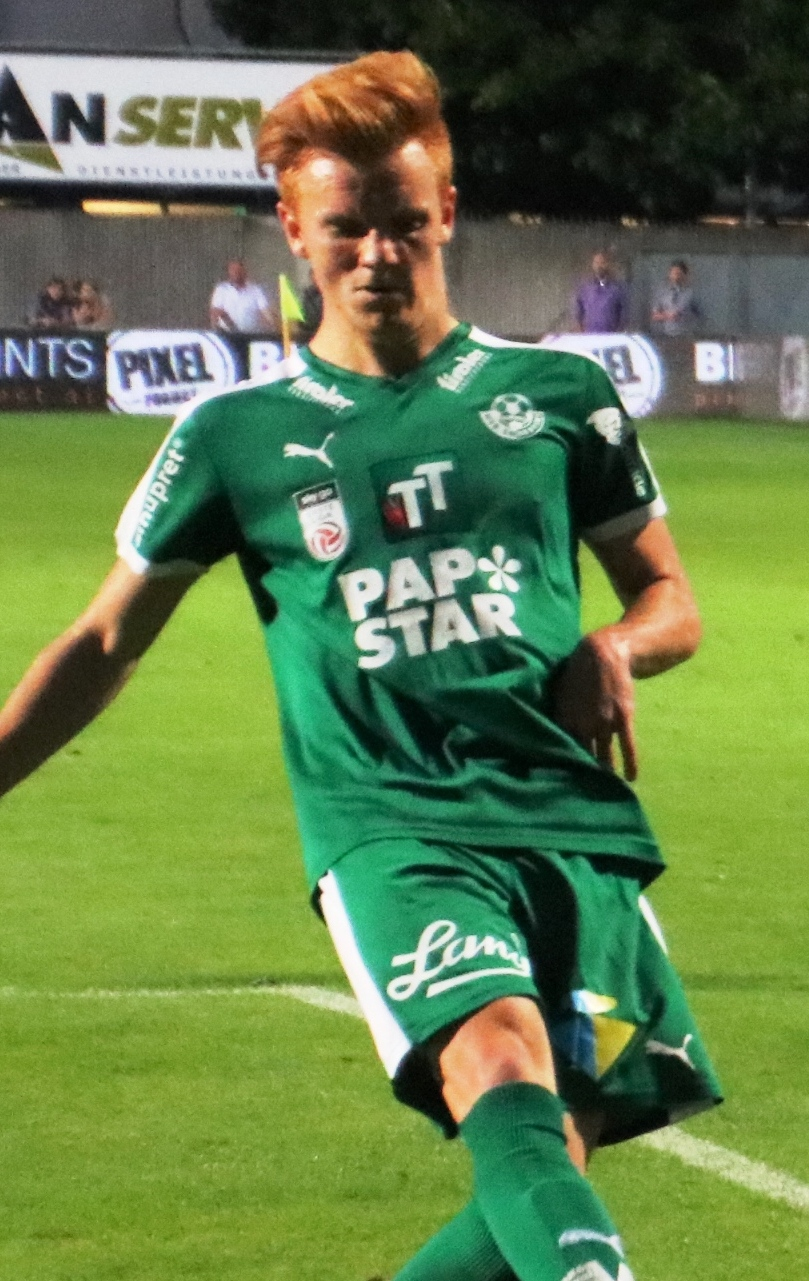
- Gebauer playing for WSG Wattens in 2016

Personal information
- Date of birth: 24 December 1993 (age 32)
- Place of birth: Austria
- Height: 1.87 m (6 ft 2 in)
- Position: Right winger

Team information
- Current team: Austria Salzburg
- Number: 71

Senior career*
Years	Team	Apps	(Gls)
2010–2011	SV Navis		
2011–2013	SV Matrei		
2013–2014	SVG Reichenau	28	(5)
2014–2017	WSG Wattens	93	(18)
2017–2020	Rheindorf Altach	93	(13)
2020–2023	Arminia Bielefeld	40	(2)
2021–2022	→ FC Ingolstadt (loan)	22	(1)
2023–2025	Rheindorf Altach	47	(3)
2026–	Austria Salzburg	11	(3)
- * Club domestic league appearances and goals as of 17 May 2026

Christian Gebauer (born 20 December 1993) is an Austrian professional footballer who plays as a right winger for Austria Salzburg.

== Club career ==
In June 2023, Gebauer returned to Rheindorf Altach on a two-year contract.
