= 2002–03 Arminia Bielefeld season =

Arminia Bielefeld
2002–03 season
- Manager: Benno Möhlmann
- Bundesliga: 16th (relegated)
- DFB-Pokal: Second Round
- Top goalscorer: League: Artur Wichniarek (12); All: Artur Wichniarek (13)

Arminia Bielefeld played the 2002–03 season in the Bundesliga. They finished in 16th place, and were relegated from the Bundesliga for the sixth time in their history.

== Player details ==
=== First team ===
Note: Flags indicate national team as defined under FIFA eligibility rules; some limited exceptions apply. Players may hold more than one non-FIFA nationality.

No.	Pos.	Nation	Player
1	GK	GER	Mathias Hain
2	DF	NOR	Torjus Hansén
3	DF	BRA	Márcio Borges
4	DF	GER	Bastian Reinhardt
5	MF	GER	Christoph Dabrowski
6	MF	GER	Detlev Dammeier
7	FW	KOR	Cha Doo-Ri (on loan from Bayer Leverkusen)
8	DF	POL	Maciej Murawski
9	FW	SCG	Rade Bogdanovic
10	MF	ALB	Fatmir Vata
11	MF	COL	Jésus Sinisterra (on loan from Banfield)
12	MF	GER	Rüdiger Kauf
13	MF	GER	Michael Sternkopf
14	FW	CRO	Ilija Aračić

No.	Pos.	Nation	Player
15	DF	POL	Daniel Bogusz
16	DF	GER	Benjamin Lense
17	MF	BEL	Bernd Rauw
18	FW	POL	Artur Wichniarek
19	FW	SEN	Mamadou Diabang
21	MF	GER	Massimilian Porcello
23	GK	GER	Dennis Eilhoff
24	FW	CZE	Marek Heinz (on loan from Hamburger SV)
25	MF	CRO	Saša Janić
27	DF	GER	Martin Amedick
28	MF	GER	Dirk Flock
29	GK	GER	Simon Henzler
30	MF	GER	Ansgar Brinkmann
33	MF	BIH	Mirnel Sadović

=== Reserve team ===
Note: Flags indicate national team as defined under FIFA eligibility rules; some limited exceptions apply. Players may hold more than one non-FIFA nationality.

No.	Pos.	Nation	Player
—	GK	GER	Oliver Nestmann
—	GK	GER	Sebastian Völzow
—	DF	TUR	Cetin Cakar
—	DF	GER	Norman Klausch
—	DF	GER	Matthias Langkamp
—	DF	GER	Ivan Rako
—	DF	GER	Carsten Rump
—	DF	GER	David Schicht
—	DF	GER	Nils-Christian Schmidt
—	DF	GER	Sebastian Veith
—	DF	GER	Dominik Werling
—	MF	GER	Sebastian Block
—	MF	TUR	Engin Baytar
—	MF	GER	Henning Grieneisen
—	MF	GER	Finn Holsing
—	MF	GER	Kai Heidenreich

No.	Pos.	Nation	Player
—	MF	GER	Pascal Hofbüker
—	MF	GER	Jonnie Klausch
—	MF	GER	Matthias Klein
—	MF	GER	Daniel Kurth
—	MF	GER	Wojtek Kwasniok
—	MF	GER	Rafael Psyk
—	MF	TUR	Firat Sansar
—	MF	GER	Marco Schlobinski
—	MF	GER	Christian Schnitker
—	MF	GER	Jan-Christopher Smith
—	FW	SCG	Arsenije Klirusic
—	FW	GER	Lars Mettenbrink
—	FW	GER	Stefan Studtrucker
—	FW	BIH	Amir Spahić
—	FW	GER	Salih Yavuz

== Transfers ==
=== In ===
Player	From	Fee	Date	Notes
(Federal Republic of Yugoslavia) Rade Bogdanović	(Germany) Werder Bremen	Free	July 2002	
(Croatia) Saša Janić	(Germany) SSV Reutlingen	Free	July 2002	
(Germany) Benjamin Lense	(Germany) Darmstadt 98	€200,000	July 2002	
(Poland) Maciej Murawski	(Poland) Legia Warsaw	Free	July 2002	
(Belgium) Bernd Rauw	(Germany) Alemannia Aachen	€180,000	July 2002	
(Colombia) Jésus Sinisterra	(Argentina) Banfield	Loan	July 2002	
(Bosnia and Herzegovina) Mirnel Sadović	Austria Vienna	Free	July 2002	
(Norway) Torjus Hansén	(Norway) Lillestrøm	€150,000	August 2002	
(South Korea) Cha Doo-Ri	(Germany) Bayer Leverkusen	Loan	August 2002	
(Czech Republic) Marek Heinz	(Germany) Hamburger SV	Loan	January 2003	
(Germany) Simon Henzler	(Germany) FC St. Pauli		January 2003	

=== Out ===
Player	To	Fee	Date	Notes
(Ghana) Lawrence Adjei	(Germany) Eintracht Trier	Free	July 2002	
(Germany) Jörg Bode	(Germany) FC Augsburg	Free	July 2002	
(Germany) Arne Friedrich	(Germany) Hertha BSC	€1,800,000	July 2002	
(Germany) André Hofschneider	(Germany) FC Augsburg	Free	July 2002	
(Germany) Alexander Klitzpera	(Germany) Alemannia Aachen	Free	July 2002	
(Croatia) Zdenko Miletić	(Germany) FC Augsburg	Free	July 2002	
(Poland) Bartosz Partyka	(Poland) Pogoń Szczecin	Free	July 2002	
(Germany) Tobias Schäper	(Germany) BV Cloppenburg	Free	July 2002	
(Germany) Christian Wück	Retired		July 2002	
(Germany) Dirk van der Ven	(Japan) Yokohama FC	Free	January 2003	
(Turkey) Erhan Albayrak	(Turkey) Fenerbahçe S.K.	Undisclosed	January 2003	
(Germany) Heinz Müller	(Germany) FC St. Pauli		January 2003	
