= List of Arminia Bielefeld internationals =

This is a list of past and present football players who were capped by their country whilst playing for Arminia Bielefeld.

Name	Country	Pld.	Gls.
Karim Bagheri	Iran	28	12
Isaac Boakye	Ghana	4	2
Daniel Bogusz	Poland	1	0
Delron Buckley	South Africa	8	0
Cha Du-ri	South Korea	4	0
Walter Claus-Oehler	Germany	2	1
Ali Daei	Iran	15	3
Mamadou Diabang	Senegal	5	0
Klodian Duro	Albania	10	0
Rowen Fernandez	South Africa	8	0
Torjus Hansén	Norway	3	0
Olli Isoaho	Finland	2	0
Jonas Kamper	Denmark	1	0
Stefan Kuntz	Germany	2	1
Ronald Maul	Germany	2	0
Maciej Murawski	Poland	1	0
Siyabonga Nkosi	South Africa	4	0
Billy Ohlsson	Sweden	1	1
Patrick Owomoyela	Germany	6	0
Jacky Peeters	Belgium	6	0
Pasi Rautiainen	Finland	8	0
Jesus Sinisterra	Colombia	2	0
Ervin Skela	Albania	11	1
Jens Steffensen	Denmark	4	0
Vanco Trajanov	North Macedonia	4	0
Fatmir Vata	Albania	4	0
Markus Weissenberger	Austria	7	0
Artur Wichniarek	Poland	9	1
Adalbert Zafirov	Bulgaria	1	0
Sibusiso Zuma	South Africa	20	10
