= List of Arminia Bielefeld managers =

This is a list of Arminia Bielefeld managers. Although the club was formed in 1905, it wasn't until 1922 when František Zoubek became the first manager of the club. The club had 48 managers in their history. Among these men were famous managers like Otto Rehhagel, who led the Greece national football team to win the Euro 2004. Ernst Middendorp, the club's manager of the century, holds the record with 93 games in the Bundesliga. The current manager is Michael Frontzeck, who was appointed on 1 January 2008.

== Managers ==
Name	Nationality	From	To	Events
František Zoubek	Czechoslovakia	1922	1923	West German champion 1923
Gerd Wellhöfer	Germany	1923	1924	Westfalian champion 1924
František Zoubek; Gerd Wellhöfer	Czechoslovakia; Germany	1924	1925	Westfalian champion 1925
Gerd Wellhöfer	Germany	1925	1926	Westfalian champion 1926
František Zoubek	Czechoslovakia	1926	1933	Westfalian champion 1927, 1933; Westfalian cupwinner 1932
Otto Faist	Germany	1933	1935	Relegation from Gauliga 1934
Wellnecker	Germany	1935	1938	Promotion to Gauliga 1938
Erich Brochmeyer	Germany	1938	1939	
Ferdinand Swatosch	Austria	1939	1940	Runners-up in Gauliga
Otto Kranefeld	Germany	1940	1942	
Karl Wunderlich	Germany	1942	1945	
Erich Brochmeyer	Germany	1945	1946	Relegation
Ferdinand Swatosch	Germany	1946	1947	
Karl Wunderlich	Germany	1947	1948	Promotion to Landesliga
Alois Münstermann	Germany	1948	1949	Promotion to Oberliga
Friedrich Otto	Germany	1949	1950	Relegation to 2nd Oberliga West
Fritz Kaiser	Germany	1950	1951	
Hellmut Maidt	Germany	1951	1953	
Donndorf	Germany	1953	1955	Relegation to Landesliga 1954
Otto Westphal	Germany	1955	1958	
Arthur Gruber	Germany	1958	19 March 1961	first manager to be sacked
Josef Rasselnberg	Germany	20 March 1961	1961	
Jakob Wimmer	Germany	1961	April 1963	Promotion to 2nd Oberliga West 1962
Hellmut Maidt	Germany	April 1963	1965	Qualification for Regionalliga West 1963
Robert Gebhardt	Germany	1965	1966	West German cup winner Westfalian cup winner
Hans Wendtland	Germany	1966	November 1969	
Egon Piechaczek	Poland	November 1969	December 1971	Promotion to Bundesliga 1970
Hellmut Maidt	Germany	January 1972	January 1972	
Jan Notermans	Netherlands	February 1972	October 1972	Relegation to Regionalliga 1972
Willi Nolting	Germany	October 1972	February 1973	
Norbert Lessle	Germany	February 1973	September 1973	
H. Garstecki	Germany	September 1973	October 1973	
Willi Nolting	Germany	October 1973	January 1974	
Rudi Faßnacht	Germany	January 1974	1974	Qualification for 2. Bundesliga; Westfalian cup winner
Erhard Ahmann	Germany	1974	1976	
Karl-Heinz Feldkamp	Germany	1976	1978	Promotion to Bundesliga
Milovan Beljin	Yugoslavia	1978	October 1978	
Otto Rehhagel	Germany	October 1978	October 1979	Relegation to 2. Bundesliga 1978
Willi Nolting	Germany	October 1979	October 1979	
Hans-Dieter Tippenhauer	Germany	October 1979	September 1980	Promotion to Bundesliga
Willi Nolting	Germany	September 1980	December 1980	
Horst Franz	Germany	December 1980	1982	
Horst Köppel	Germany	1982	1983	
Karl-Heinz Feldkamp	Germany	1983	March 1984	
Gerd Roggensack	Germany	March 1984	February 1986	Relegation to 2. Bundesliga 1985
Horst Franz	Germany	February 1986	November 1986	
Fritz Fuchs	Germany	November 1986	December 1987	
Joachim Krug	Germany	December 1987	April 1988	
Ernst Middendorp	Germany	April 1988	October 1990	Relegation to Oberliga Westfalen 1988; Champions of Oberliga Westfalen 1990
Franz Raschid	Germany	October 1990	1991	
Fritz Grösche	Germany	1991	1992	
Ingo Peter	Germany	1992	February 1994	
Theo Schneider	Germany	February 1994	1994	Qualification for Regionalliga West/Südwest
Wolfgang Sidka	Germany	1994	September 1994	
Ernst Middendorp	Germany	September 1994	16 August 1998	Promotion to 2. Bundesliga 1995; Promotion to Bundesliga 1996; Relegation to 2. Bundesliga 1998
Thomas von Heesen	Germany	17 August 1998	1999	Promotion to Bundesliga
Hermann Gerland	Germany	1999	October 2000	Relegation to 2. Bundesliga
Benno Möhlmann	Germany	October 2000	16 February 2004	Promotion to Bundesliga 2002; Relegation to 2. Bundesliga 2003
Thomas von Heesen	Germany	17 February 2004	29 February 2004	
Uwe Rapolder	Germany	1 March 2004	10 May 2005	Promotion to Bundesliga
Frank Geideck	Germany	11 May 2005	2005	
Thomas von Heesen	Germany	2005	11 February 2007	
Frank Geideck	Germany	11 February 2007	13 March 2007	
Ernst Middendorp	Germany	14 March 2007	9 December 2007	
Detlev Dammeier	Germany	10 December 2007	31 December 2007	
Michael Frontzeck	Germany	1 January 2008		

== Sources ==
- Kirschneck, Jens (2005). Arminia Bielefeld – 100 Jahre Leidenschaft. Göttingen: Verlag Die Werkstatt. ISBN 3-89533-479-0.
- "Die Trainer seit 1922" (in German). Blaue Daten. Archived from the original on 26 October 2007.
