= List of Arminia Bielefeld seasons =

Coordinates: 52.032495°N 8.515713°E

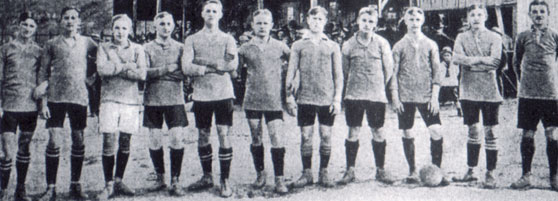
Arminia´s first team in 1911.

This is a list of seasons played by Arminia Bielefeld in German football, from their first competitive to the most recent completed season. It details the club's achievements in major competitions, and the top scorers for each season.

The club was formed on 3 May 1905 as 1. Bielefelder Fußballclub (BFC) Arminia. The Fußballclub Siegfried Bielefeld joined Arminia two years later. On 7 July 1919, Arminia merged with the Bielefelder Turngemeinde 1848 and became known as Turngemeinde Arminia Bielefeld. However, this merger was not successful and had to declare bankruptcy on 20 October 1922. The 1. BFC Arminia was reestablished on 6 November 1922 and was renamed into the current name, Deutscher Sportclub Arminia Bielefeld, on 30 January 1926.

== Key ==
- W = Matches won
- D = Matches drawn
- L = Matches lost
- GF = Goals for
- GA = Goals against
- Pts = Points
- Pos = Final position

Promoted	Relegated

Name in **bold** indicates the league's top scorer.

- NH = Not held
- DNQ = Did not qualify
- R1 = Round 1
- R2 = Round 2
- R3 = Round 3
- R4 = Round 4
- QF = Quarter-finals
- SF = Semi-finals

== Seasons ==
=== until 1933 ===
Season	League	Pos	Level	Goals	Points	Note
1906–07	1. Klasse	3.	I	7:7	6:6	
1907–08	1. Klasse, Abt. B	1.	I	9:4	6:2	Westfalian championship: Lost vs. Teutonia Osnabrück (1:4)
1908–09	A-Klasse	2.	I	35:21	18:6	
1909–10	A-Klasse	5.	I	19:26	6:18	
1910–11	A-Klasse, Gr. Ost	2.	II	29:17	9:7	
1911–12	A-Klasse, Gr. Ost	7.	II	28:33	10:18	
1912–13	A-Klasse, Gr. Ost	1.	II	40:12	22:6	Westfalian championship: Won vs. BV Dortmund 04 (5:1); West German championship: Lost in semi-finals vs. Union Düsseldorf (0:1)
1913–14	Kreisliga Westfalen	2.	I	34:16	20:8	
1914–15	Bezirk Ravensberg-Lippe	2.	I	?.?	14:2	
1915–16	Bezirk Ravensberg-Lippe	1.	I	24:3	12:0	
1916–17	Bezirk Ravensberg-Lippe	1.	I	40:16	20:4	
1917–18	Bezirk Ravensberg-Lippe	2.	I	20:10	11:5	
1918–19	Championship abandoned					
1919–20	Bezirksklasse Westfalen	2.	I	39:22	23:11	
1920–21	Kreisliga Westfalen, Gr. Ost	1.	I	51:11	28:6	Westfalian championship: disqualified
1921–22	Bezirksklasse Westfalen	1.	I	57:10	36:0	West German championship: winner German championship: Lost quarter-finals vs. FC Wacker München (0:5)
1922–23	Bezirksklasse Westfalen, Gr. Ost	1.	I	32:12	14:0	Westfalian championship: Won vs. Preußen Münster (7:0); West German championship: Won vs. TuRU Düsseldorf (4:3 aet); German championship: Lost quarter-finals vs. Union Oberschöneweide (0:0 aet, 1:2 aet)
1923–24	Bezirksklasse Westfalen	1.	I	75:20	34:4	Westfalian championship: Won vs. Westfalia Scherlebeck (9:0); West German championship: third place
1924–25	Bezirksklasse Westfalen	1.	I	52:8	24:4	West German championship: third place
1925–26	Bezirksklasse Westfalen	1.	I	108:18	50:6	West German championship: fifth place
1926–27	Bezirksliga Westfalen, Gr. Ost	1.	I	68:14	28:0	Westfalian championship: Won vs. Borussia Rheine (4:0, 5:0); West German championship: fifth place
1927–28	Bezirksliga Westfalen, Gr. Ost	2.	I	67:17	22:6	
1928–29	Bezirksliga Westfalen, Gr. Ost	1.	I	28:12	20:18	Westfalian championship: Lost vs. SpVgg Herten (1:1, 1:3)
1929–30	Sonderliga Gesamtwestfalen	5.	I	26:33	12:16	
1930–31	Bezirksliga Westfalen, Gr. Ost	2.	I	50:23	26:10	
1931–32	Bezirksliga Westfalen, Gr. Ost	4.	I	45:33	23:17	Westfalian cup: Won vs. VfL Osnabrück (3:1)
1932–33	Bezirksliga Westfalen, Gr. Ost	1.	I	55:22	30:6	Westfalian championship: Won vs. SpVgg Herten (2:2, 2:2, 4:2); West German championship: Lost quarter-finals vs. SuS Hüsten 09 (0:4)

=== from 1933 ===
Season	League									German Cup	Top goalscorer(s)	
Season	Division	Lev	Pos	W	D	L	GF	GA	Pts	German Cup	Name(s)	Goals
1933–34	Gauliga Westfalen	I	10th	2	2	14	23	60	6:30			
1934–35	Bezirksliga Ostwestfalen	II	2nd				100	25	33:7	DNQ		
1935–36	Bezirksliga Ostwestfalen	II	2nd				58	27	31:13	R1		
1936–37	Bezirksliga Ostwestfalen	II	1st				83	24	39:5	DNQ		
1937–38	Bezirksliga Ostwestfalen	II	1st				95	17	38:6	DNQ		
1938–39	Gauliga Westfalen	I	6th	6	5	7	29	28	17:19	R2		
1939–40	Gauliga Westfalen	I	2nd	10	1	7	49	42	21:15	DNQ		
1940–41	Gauliga Westfalen	I	6th	10	3	9	56	52	23:21	DNQ		
1941–42	Gauliga Westfalen	I	6th	8	3	7	44	48	19:17	R2		
1942–43	Gauliga Westfalen	I	7th	8	1	9	41	43	17:19	DNQ		
1943–44	Gauliga Westfalen	I	10th	2	6	10	23	50	10:26	DNQ		
1944–45	Kriegsgauklasse, Gr. 3	I	Championship abandoned.									
1945–46	Landesliga Westfalen, Gr. 2	I	8th	4	6	6	21	34	14:18	NH		
1946–47	Bezirksliga, Gr. Bielefeld/Lippe	II	5th				37	34	19:17	NH		
1947–48	Bezirksliga, Gr. Bielefeld/Lippe	III	1st				119	29	41:3	NH		
1948–49	Landesliga Westfalen, Gr. 3	II	1st				75	29	38:14	NH		
1949–50]	Oberliga West	I	15th	5	7	18	32	72	17:43	NH		
1950–51	II. Division West, Gr. 1	II	9th	10	7	13	64	68	27:33	NH		
1951–52	II. Division West, Gr. 1	II	4th	15	6	11	53	40	36:28	NH		
1952–53	II. Division West	II	6th	15	3	12	45	52	33:27	DNQ		
1953–54	II. Division West	II	16th	8	6	16	37	64	22:38	DNQ		
1954–55	Landesliga Ostwestfalen	III	3rd	19	2	9	64	37	40:20	DNQ		
1955–56	Landesliga Ostwestfalen	III	4th	17	4	7	64	35	38:18	DNQ		
1956–57	Verbandsliga, Gr. Nordost	III	3rd	15	6	9	44	38	36:24	DNQ		
1957–58	Verbandsliga, Gr. Nordost	III	2nd	21	4	5	89	38	43:17	DNQ		
1958–59	Verbandsliga, Gr. Nordost	III	3rd	14	10	6	43	25	38:22	DNQ		
1959–60	Verbandsliga, Gr. Nordost	III	5th	14	8	8	60	40	36:24	DNQ		
1960–61	Verbandsliga, Gr. Nordost	III	2nd	16	3	9	62	37	35:21	DNQ		
1961–62	Verbandsliga, Gr. Nordost	III	1st	17	6	5	64	27	40:16	DNQ		
1962–63	II. Division West	II	7th	14	4	12	51	44	32:28	DNQ		
1963–64	Regionalliga West	II	11th	14	10	14	65	74	38:38	DNQ	Gerd Roggensack	21
1964–65	Regionalliga West	II	5th	15	9	10	68	52	39:29	DNQ		
1965–66	Regionalliga West	II	10th	13	6	15	60	58	32:36	R1		
1966–67	Regionalliga West	II	3rd	17	11	6	72	39	45:23	DNQ	**Ernst Kuster**	23
1967–68	Regionalliga West	II	4th	19	8	7	77	44	46:22	R1	**Ernst Kuster**	28
1968–69	Regionalliga West	II	7th	14	10	10	63	47	38:30	DNQ	**Ernst Kuster**	23
1969–70	Regionalliga West	II	2nd	20	8	6	61	30	48:20	DNQ	Ernst Kuster	29
1970–71	Bundesliga	I	14th	12	5	17	39	56	29:39	R1	Ernst Kuster	8
1971–72	Bundesliga	I	18th	6	7	21	47	75	19:49	R1	Karl-Heinz Brücken Jürgen Jendrossek	7
1972–73	Regionalliga West	II	11th	9	12	13	46	66	30:38	DNQ	Karl-Heinz Brücken	8
1973–74	Regionalliga West	II	14th	9	9	16	41	52	27:41	R2		
1974–75	2. Bundesliga Nord	II	4th	18	14	6	68	47	50:26	R1	**Volker Graul**	30
1975–76	2. Bundesliga Nord	II	9th	14	14	10	49	46	42:34	R4	Volker Graul Roland Peitsch	11
1976–77	2. Bundesliga Nord	II	2nd	19	12	7	72	39	50:26	R4	Harry Erhart	11
1977–78	2. Bundesliga Nord	II	1st	23	5	10	74	40	51:25	R1	Norbert Eilenfeldt	16
1978–79	Bundesliga	I	16th	9	8	17	43	56	26:42	R2	Norbert Eilenfeldt	10
1979–80	2. Bundesliga Nord	II	1st	30	6	2	120	31	66:10	R3	**Christian Sackewitz**	35
1980–81	Bundesliga	I	15th	10	6	18	46	65	26:42	R1	Gerd-Volker Schock	16
1981–82	Bundesliga	I	12th	12	6	16	46	50	30:38	R2	Gerd-Volker Schock	7
1982–83	Bundesliga	I	8th	12	7	15	46	71	31:37	R3	Frank Pagelsdorf	11
1983–84	Bundesliga	I	8th	12	9	13	40	49	33:35	R2	Frank Pagelsdorf	10
1984–85	Bundesliga	I	16th	8	13	13	46	61	29:39	R1	Siegfried Reich	18
1985–86	2. Bundesliga	II	4th	18	9	11	60	47	45:31	R1	Stefan Kohn	14
1986–87	2. Bundesliga	II	9th	12	14	12	58	55	38:38	R2	Matthias Westerwinter	11
1987–88	2. Bundesliga	II	20th	6	10	22	29	67	22:54	R1	Matthias Westerwinter	5
1988–89	Oberliga Westfalen	III	2nd	19	8	3	58	21	46:14	R1	Manfred Lonnemann	11
1989–90	Oberliga Westfalen	III	1st	20	9	1	68	17	49:11	DNQ	Gerrit Meinke	16
1990–91	Oberliga Westfalen	III	5th	15	3	12	55	39	33:27	DNQ	Gerrit Meinke	13
1991–92	Oberliga Westfalen	III	4th	17	10	3	48	18	44:16	R2	Gerrit Meinke	15
1992–93	Oberliga Westfalen	III	3rd	18	7	9	69	42	43:25	DNQ	Theo Schneider	15
1993–94	Oberliga Westfalen	III	3rd	14	11	5	48	28	39:21	DNQ	Markus Wuckel	12
1994–95	Regionalliga West/Südwest	III	1st	20	10	4	65	28	50:18	DNQ	Markus Wuckel	13
1995–96	2. Bundesliga	II	2nd	16	9	9	55	45	57	R2	**Fritz Walter**	21
1996–97	Bundesliga	I	14th	11	7	16	46	54	40	R2	Stefan Kuntz	14
1997–98	Bundesliga	I	18th	8	8	18	43	56	32	R3	Stefan Kuntz	11
1998–99	2. Bundesliga	II	1st	20	7	7	62	32	67	R3	**Bruno Labbadia**	28
1999–2000	Bundesliga	I	17th	7	9	18	40	61	30	R4	Bruno Labbadia	11
2000–01	2. Bundesliga	II	13th	10	11	13	53	46	41	R2	**Artur Wichniarek**	18
2001–02	2. Bundesliga	II	2nd	19	8	7	68	38	65	R2	**Artur Wichniarek**	20
2002–03	Bundesliga	I	16th	8	12	14	35	46	36	R2	Artur Wichniarek	12
2003–04	2. Bundesliga	II	2nd	16	8	10	50	37	56	R1	Isaac Boakye	14
2004–05	Bundesliga	I	13th	11	7	16	37	49	40	SF	Delron Buckley	15
2005–06	Bundesliga	I	13th	10	7	17	32	47	37	SF	Isaac Boakye	8
2006–07	Bundesliga	I	12th	11	9	14	47	49	42	R1	Artur Wichniarek	10
2007–08	Bundesliga	I	15th	8	10	16	35	60	34	R3	Artur Wichniarek	10
2008–09	Bundesliga	I	18th	4	16	14	29	56	28	R2	Artur Wichniarek	13
2009–10	2. Bundesliga	II	7th	16	5	13	48	41	49	R2	Giovanni Federico	12
2010–11	2. Bundesliga	II	18th	4	8	22	17	28	65	R2	Sebastian Heidinger Josip Tadić	5
2011–12	3. Liga	III	13th	12	14	12	51	57	50	R1	Fabian Klos	10
2012–13	3. Liga	III	2nd	22	10	6	59	32	76	R2	**Fabian Klos**	20
2013–14	2. Bundesliga	II	16th	9	8	17	40	58	35	R2	Fabian Klos	9
2014–15	3. Liga	III	1st	22	8	2	75	41	74	SF	**Fabian Klos**	23
2015–16	2. Bundesliga	II	12th	8	18	8	38	39	42	R1	Fabian Klos	12
2016–17	2. Bundesliga	II	15th	8	13	13	50	54	37	QF	Fabian Klos	13
2017–18	2. Bundesliga	II	4th	12	12	10	51	47	48	R1	Andreas Voglsammer	13
2018–19	2. Bundesliga	II	7th	13	10	11	52	50	49	R2	Fabian Klos	17
2019–20	2. Bundesliga	II	1st	18	14	2	65	30	68	R2	**Fabian Klos**	21
2020–21	Bundesliga	I	15th	9	8	17	26	52	35	R1	Ritsu Dōan Fabian Klos	5
2021–22	Bundesliga	I	17th	5	13	16	27	53	28	R2	Masaya Okugawa	8
2022–23	2. Bundesliga	II	16th	9	7	18	50	62	34	R2	Robin Hack	13
2023–24	3. Liga	III	14th	11	13	14	48	47	46	R2	Fabian Klos	10
2024–25	3. Liga	III	1st	21	9	8	64	36	72	RU	Julian Kania	14
2025–26	2. Bundesliga	II	14th	10	9	15	53	51	39	R2	Joel Grodowski	12

== Sources ==
- Kirschneck, Jens (2005). Arminia Bielefeld - 100 Jahre Leidenschaft. Göttingen: Verlag Die Werkstatt. ISBN 3-89533-479-0.
- "Alle Ligaplazierungen seit Gründung des Vereins" (in German). Blaue Daten. Archived from the original on October 21, 2007.
