= Sascha Franz =

German football manager (born 1974)

Personal information
- Date of birth: 16 January 1974
- Place of birth: Germany

Managerial career
- Years: Team
- 2006–2007: Sportfreunde Siegen (assistant)
- 2007–2009: FC Augsburg (assistant)
- 2011: FC Astana
- 2012–2016: SV Darmstadt 98 (assistant)
- 2016: FC Augsburg (assistant)
- 2017–2019: SV Darmstadt 98 (assistant)
- 2019–2021: FC Erzgebirge Aue (assistant)
- 2022–2023: 1. FC Kaiserslautern (assistant)

Sascha Franz (born 16 January 1974) is a German football manager who was last assistant manager of 1. FC Kaiserslautern.

== Early life ==
Franz was born in 1974 in Germany. He attended Humboldtgymnasium Solingen in Germany.

== Career ==
In 2006, Franz was appointed assistant manager of German side Sportfreunde Siegen. In 2007, he was appointed assistant manager of German side FC Augsburg. In 2011, he managed Kazakhstani side FC Astana. He helped the club win the 2011 Kazakhstan Super Cup. In 2012, he was appointed assistant manager of German side SV Darmstadt 98. He was described as "played a key role in the success of SV Darmstadt 98". In 2016, he returned to German side FC Augsburg. In 2017, he returned to German side SV Darmstadt 98. In 2019, he was appointed assistant manager of German side FC Erzgebirge Aue. In 2022, he was appointed assistant manager of German side 1. FC Kaiserslautern.

== Personal life ==
Franz has been married. He is the son of German football manager Horst Franz.
