= Benjamin Lense =

German footballer

Personal information
- Date of birth: 30 November 1978 (age 47)
- Place of birth: Lich, West Germany
- Height: 1.90 m (6 ft 3 in)
- Position: Defender

Youth career
- 1982–: SV Harbach
- –1997: VfR Lich
- 1997–1999: Eintracht Frankfurt

Senior career*
Years	Team	Apps	(Gls)
1999–2001	Dynamo Dresden	32	(1)
2001–2002	Darmstadt 98	20	(0)
2002–2005	Arminia Bielefeld	56	(2)
2005–2006	1. FC Nürnberg	11	(0)
2006–2007	VfL Bochum	8	(0)
2007–2009	Hansa Rostock	22	(2)
2009–2010	TuS Koblenz	24	(3)
2010–2011	Arminia Bielefeld	2	(0)
Total		175	(8)

International career
2006	Germany Team 2006	1	(0)
- * Club domestic league appearances and goals

Benjamin Lense (born 30 November 1978) is a German former professional footballer who played as a defender. Lense made 64 appearances in the Bundesliga during his playing career.
