= Zdenko Miletić =

Croatian footballer and coach

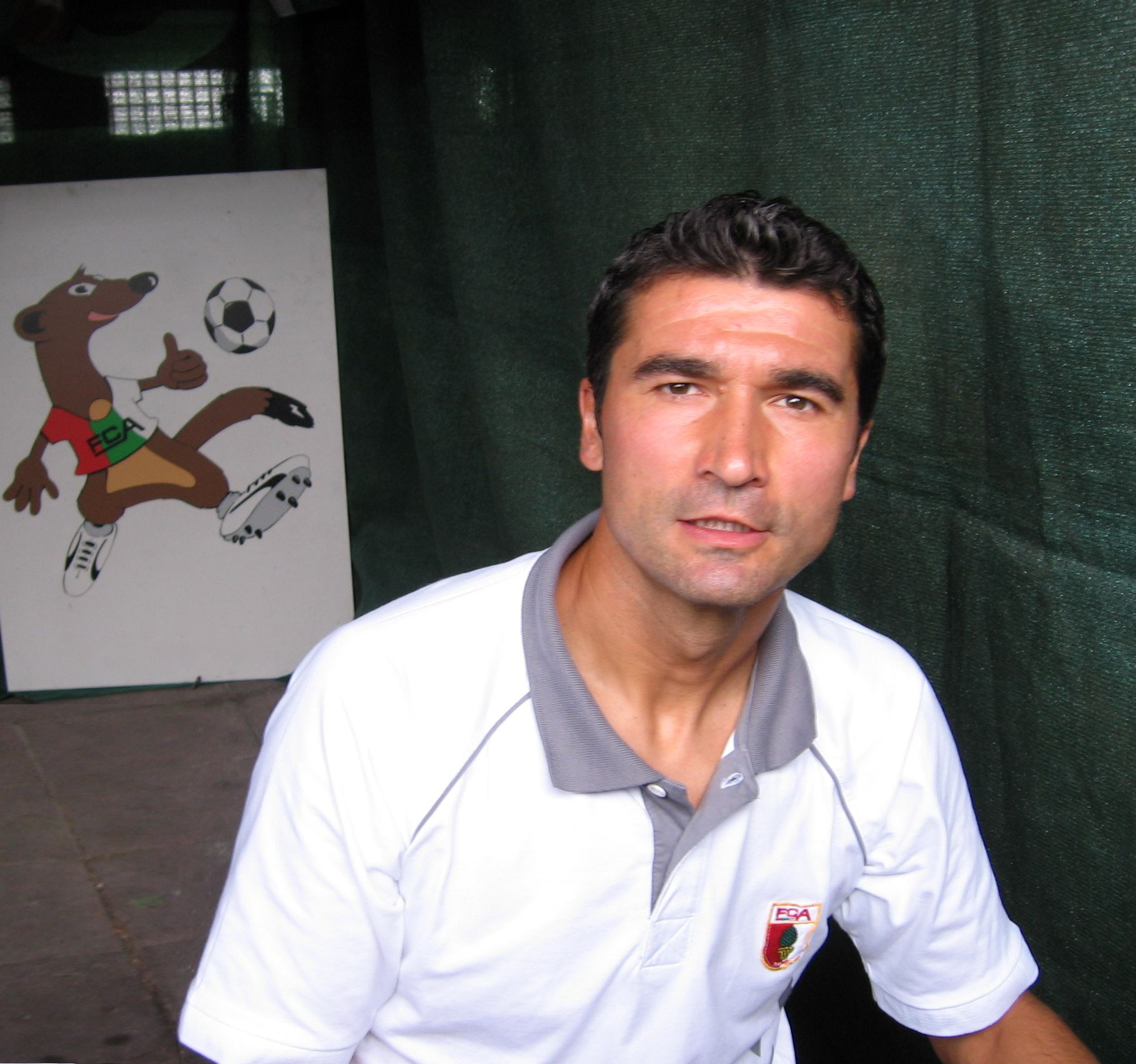
- Miletić in 2006

Personal information
- Date of birth: 23 April 1968 (age 58)
- Place of birth: Sarajevo, SFR Yugoslavia
- Height: 1.91 m (6 ft 3 in)
- Position: Goalkeeper

Youth career
- Dinamo Zagreb

Senior career*
Years	Team	Apps	(Gls)
–1990	NK Zagreb		
1990–1991	Maribor		
1991–1993	Preußen Münster		
1993–1995	SC Verl	22	(0)
1995–2002	Arminia Bielefeld	36	(0)
2002–2007	FC Augsburg	117	(0)
- * Club domestic league appearances and goals

Zdenko Miletić (born 23 April 1968) is a Croatian former professional footballer who played as a goalkeeper, primarily in the German leagues.

He works as goalkeeper coach for FC Augsburg.
