= Finn Holsing =

German footballer

Personal information
- Date of birth: 9 August 1983 (age 43)
- Place of birth: Lübbecke, West Germany
- Height: 1.76 m (5 ft 9 in)
- Position: Midfielder

Senior career*
Years	Team	Apps	(Gls)
2002–2005	Arminia Bielefeld II	72	(9)
2004–2005	Arminia Bielefeld	3	(0)
2005–2007	Eintracht Braunschweig	29	(2)
2005–2007	→ Eintracht Braunschweig II	12	(3)
2007–2009	Werder Bremen II	43	(0)
2009–2010	Rot-Weiss Essen	5	(0)
Total		184	(15)
- * Club domestic league appearances and goals

Finn Holsing (born 9 August 1983) is a German former professional footballer who played as a midfielder.
