= Hans-Dieter Tippenhauer =

German football manager (1943–2021)

Personal information
- Date of birth: 16 October 1943
- Place of birth: Mieruniszki, East Prussia, Germany
- Date of death: 1 April 2021
- Place of death: Hamburg, Germany

Managerial career
- Years: Team
- 1977–1978: Fortuna Düsseldorf (assistant)
- 1978–1979: Fortuna Düsseldorf
- 1979–1980: Arminia Bielefeld
- 1983: Bayer Uerdingen
- 1983: Borussia Dortmund

Hans-Dieter Tippenhauer (16 October 1943 – 1 April 2021) was a German football manager.

== Career ==
Hans-Dieter Tippenhauer was born on 16 October 1943 in Merunen in East Prussia, the second son of Gertrud (nee Faltin) and Wilhelm Tippenhauer. His older brother Ulrich Tippenhauer (1942–1983) became a professor of mathematics at the Technical University of Kaiserslautern. After attending elementary school in Dortmund, Hans-Dieter Tippenhauer passed his examination as an industrial clerk in 1961 at the age of 17 and subsequently worked in this field. After completing 18 months of military service, in March 1967 he received his entrance qualification for a technical college in Essen and graduated from the Fachhochschule Dortmund in autumn 1969 with a degree in business administration.In the course of the reorganization and restructuring of the technical colleges and universities, he was awarded the diploma in business administration and thus the general higher education entrance qualification.

After his own career as a footballer in midfield for Eintracht Duisburg, which had brought him to the then second-class Regionalliga West in the 1966–67 season, he was able to start studying sports at the German Sport University Cologne thanks to the upgrade he had achieved. Here he acquired the teaching qualification for vocational schools and also the highest coaching licenses in football (1974 the A license and 1975 the football teacher's license), both of which he completed with a grade of 1.0. During his final year at the sports academy, he coached the sports academy's football team on behalf of the two chief trainers, Gero Bisanz and Karl-Heinz Heddergott, and at the same time coached the third-division club Godesberger FV. In 1974 he married. The marriage produced two children.

He started his coaching career in the Bundesliga in 1975 as an assistant coach at Eintracht Frankfurt alongside Dietrich Weise, which he remained under his successors Roos and Lóránt in the 1976–77 season. In 1977 he became assistant coach to Weise, who was now training Fortuna Düsseldorf. A year later he was promoted to head coach himself; under him the club finished seventh in the Bundesliga in 1978–79. Fortuna Düsseldorf achieved one of the best-known Bundesliga victories in their history when they defeated FC Bayern Munich 7–1 on 9 December 1978, inflicting their heaviest away defeat to date. On 16 September 1978 in Darmstadt, under Tippenhauer, the Flingerans also achieved the highest Bundesliga away win in their history with a 6–1 win. The team was also able to win the DFB Cup for the first time on 23 June 1979 with a 1-0 final victory over Hertha BSC. Fortuna led Tippen even played in the final of the European Cup Winners' Cup on 16 May 1979 in Basel's St. Jakob Stadium, which they lost 4–3 after extra time against FC Barcelona. The 1979–80 season began for Fortuna with five losses in their first eight Bundesliga games, leading to Tippenhauer being replaced by Otto Rehhagel in October.

Then he managed with the second division Arminia Bielefeld as the first in 1980 direct promotion to the Bundesliga. After ten days of play he was there with Arminia but in last place, which is why he was replaced in October by Willi Nolting, who himself soon had to give way to Horst Franz, under whom he managed to stay up. For the 1980–81 season, Tippenhauer became manager of the second division club Bayer Uerdingen. In the spring of 1983, after the dismissal of Werner Biskup, he was also coach of the team for the last 15 league games and achieved promotion to the Bundesliga in the relegation games against Schalke 04. After promotion to the Bundesliga, Friedhelm Konietzka became the coach of Bayer Uerdingen and Tippenhauer was only the club's manager.

In the 1983–84 season he became manager in October 1983 and, as successor to the dismissed Uli Maslo, coach of Borussia Dortmund at the same time until Horst Franz began as coach in November 1983. At the beginning of the 1984–85 season he was dismissed from Borussia Dortmund as manager in October 1984 together with the coach Timo Konietzka who had been hired by him.

After his coaching career, Tippenhauer lived for about 20 years in the Westphalian municipality of Ladbergen in the Tecklenburger Land. Against the background of holding sporting events, he founded several agencies and was, among other things, the managing director of an advertising agency in Hamburg, which has been publishing the book Der Große Restaurant & Hotel Guide in cooperation with Bertelsmann AG since 1997 and whose management he gave up in 2013.

He received his doctorate in 2010 at the Westfälische Wilhelms-University of Münster on the "perceived influence of leading players in the Bundesliga" in the subject of sports psychology, on which he had worked for three and a half years. Intensive discussions with Bernd Strauss, whom he had met in 2003–04, gave him the idea of a study on the Bundesliga.

Tippenhauer died on 1 April 2021 in Hamburg, at the age of 77.

== Sporting successes ==
- 1979 with Fortuna Düsseldorf – finalist in the European Cup Winners' Cup
- 1979 with Fortuna Düsseldorf – German Cup Winner
- 1980 with Arminia Bielefeld – promotion to the Bundesliga (first place 2. Bundesliga North)
- 1983 with Bayer Uerdingen – promotion to the Bundesliga (relegation against Schalke 04 3–1/1–1)
