= Mirnel Sadović =

Bosnian-Herzegovinian footballer (born 1984)

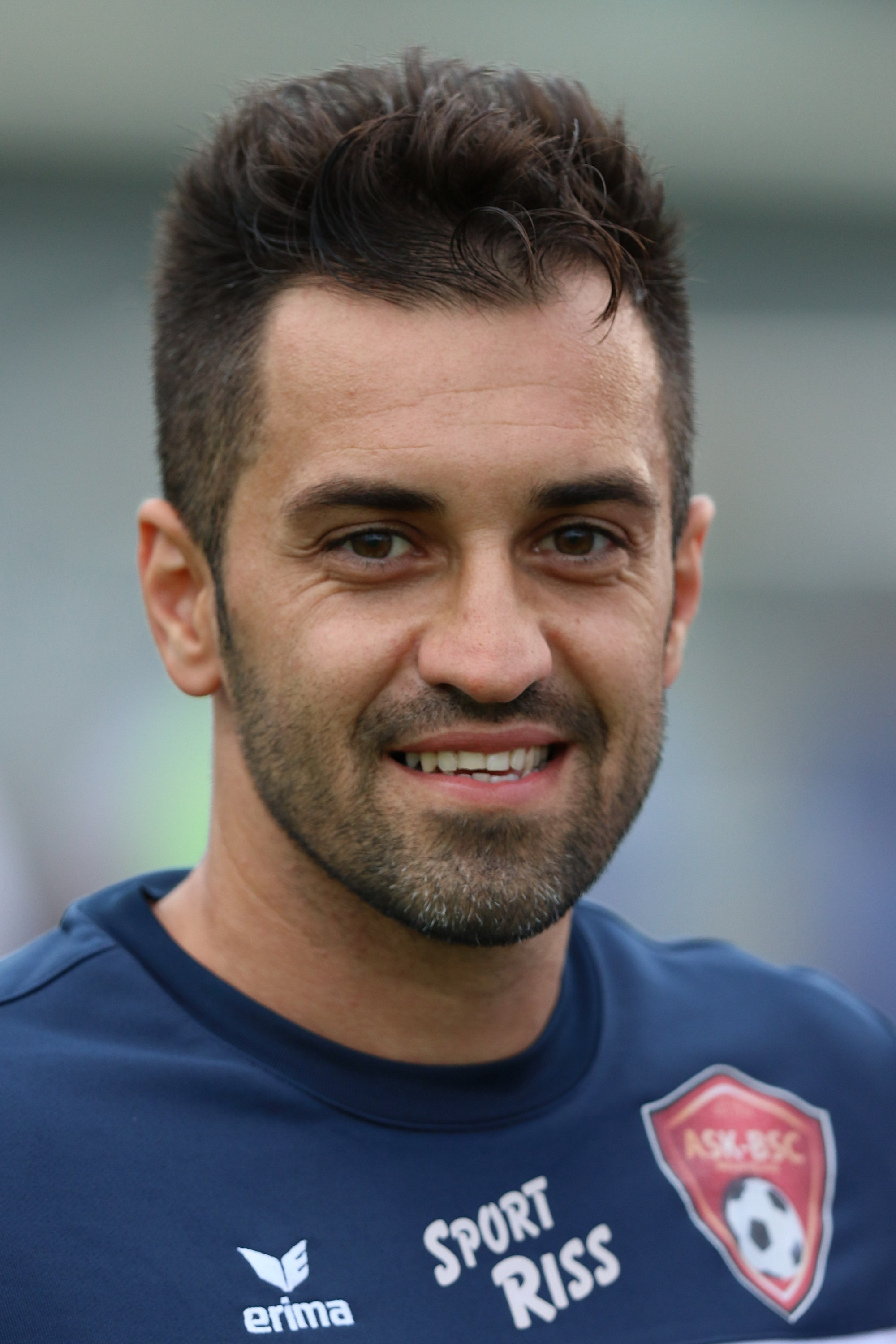
- Sadović in 2017

Personal information
- Date of birth: 25 May 1984 (age 42)
- Place of birth: Sarajevo, SFR Yugoslavia
- Height: 1.75 m (5 ft 9 in)
- Position: Striker

Youth career
- FAC Team für Wien
- Admira Wacker
- Austria Wien

Senior career*
Years	Team	Apps	(Gls)
2000–2002	Austria Wien	0	(0)
2002–2004	Arminia Bielefeld	2	(0)
2004	FK Sarajevo	4	(0)
2005	SC Untersiebenbrunn	15	(1)
2005	Austria Lustenau II		(1)
2006	Kremser SC	12	(4)
2006	Admira Wacker II	13	(3)
2007–2009	SKN St. Pölten	61	(39)
2009–2011	Wiener Neustadt	44	(13)
2011–2012	Rheindorf Altach	10	(3)
2012–2014	SKN St. Pölten	68	(17)
2014–2016	FAC	45	(4)
2017–2018	Bruck/Leitha	40	(17)

International career
2004	Bosnia and Herzegovina U21	1	(0)
- * Club domestic league appearances and goals as of 4 July 2016

Mirnel Sadović (born 25 May 1984 in Sarajevo, SR Bosnia, SFR Yugoslavia) is a Bosnian retired footballer.

== Club career ==
Sadović played the large part of his career in the Austrian leagues.
