= Simon Henzler =

German footballer (born 1976)

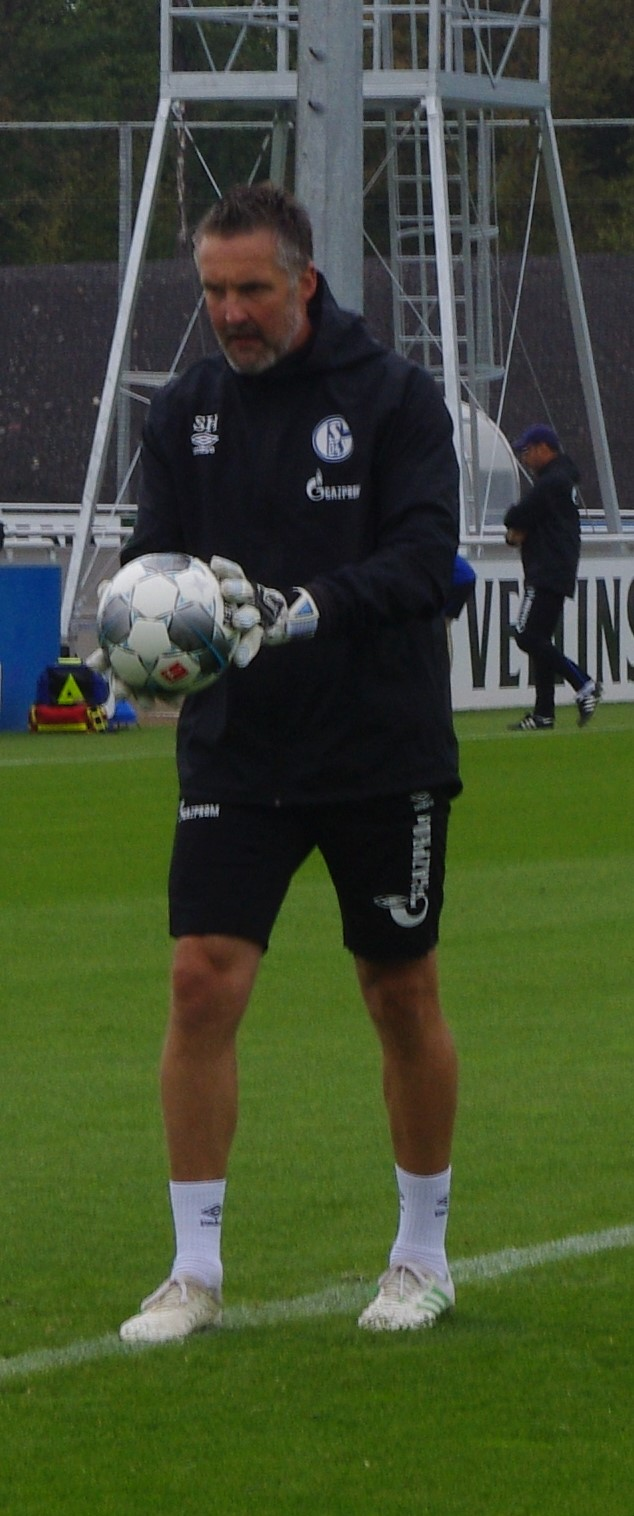
- Henzler in 2019

Personal information
- Date of birth: 1 December 1976 (age 49)
- Place of birth: Ravensburg, West Germany
- Height: 1.88 m (6 ft 2 in)
- Position: Goalkeeper

Team information
- Current team: Schalke 04 (goalkeeper coach)

Youth career
- SV Weingarten
- SSV Ulm
- VfB Stuttgart

Senior career*
| Years | Team | Apps | (Gls) |
| 1995–1996 | VfB Stuttgart II | 13 | (0) |
| 1996–1997 | FC Tirol Innsbruck | 0 | (0) |
| 1997–2000 | SV Meppen | 16 | (0) |
| 2000–2002 | FC St. Pauli | 25 | (0) |
| 2003 | Arminia Bielefeld | 0 | (0) |
| 2003–2004 | Union Berlin | 2 | (0) |
| 2004–2011 | Holstein Kiel | 90 | (0) |
| Total | | 146 | (0) |

Managerial career
- 2011–2014: Holstein Kiel (goalkeeper coach)
- 2014–2015: SC Paderborn (goalkeeper coach)
- 2015–: Schalke 04 (goalkeeping coach)
- * Club domestic league appearances and goals

Simon Henzler (born 1 December 1976) is a German football coach and former player. He works as goalkeeping coach for Schalke 04.

== Career ==
Henzler was born in Ravensburg. He spent two seasons in the Bundesliga with FC St. Pauli and Arminia Bielefeld.
