= Mieruniszki =

- Village
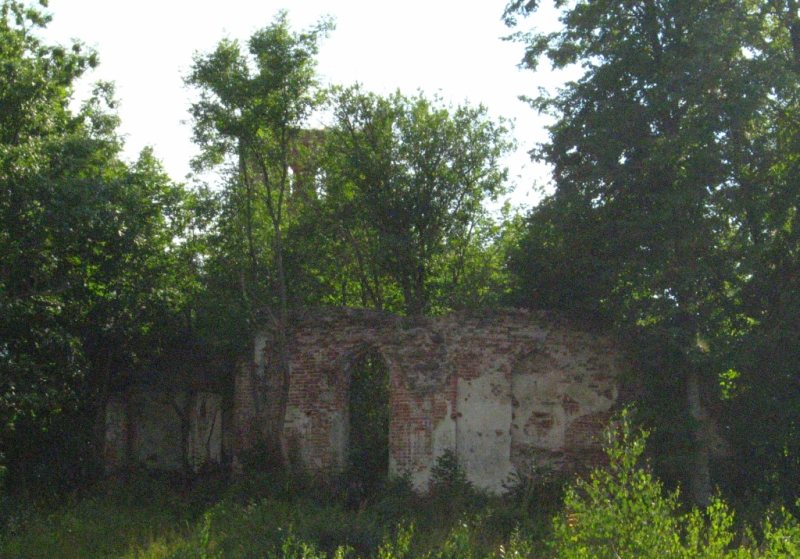
- Church ruins in Mieruniszki

- Location within Poland
- Coordinates: 54°10′N 22°34′E
- Country: Poland
- Voivodeship: Podlaskie
- County: Suwałki
- Gmina: Filipów
- Population: 170

Mieruniszki [mjɛruˈniʂki] is a village in the administrative district of Gmina Filipów, within Suwałki County, Podlaskie Voivodeship, in north-eastern Poland.

The now-ruined village church was built in 1545.

== Notable residents ==
- Hans-Dieter Tippenhauer (1943–2021), German football manager
