= Hans Wendlandt =

German footballer and manager

Personal information
- Date of birth: 18 January 1918
- Date of death: 20 February 1978 (aged 60)
- Position: Midfielder

Senior career*
Years	Team	Apps	(Gls)
1937–1948	SC Victoria Hamburg		
1948–1949	Wedeler TSV		

Managerial career
- 1951–1954: Waldhof Mannheim
- 1954–1957: Freiburger FC
- 1959–1961: Schwarz-Weiß Essen
- 1961–1964: Freiburger FC
- 1964–1966: Schwarz-Weiß Essen
- 1966–1969: Arminia Bielefeld
- 1969–1970: Waldhof Mannheim
- 1970–1973: Freiburger FC
- 1973: Waldhof Mannheim
- * Club domestic league appearances and goals

Hans Wendlandt (18 January 1918 – 20 February 1978) was a German football player and manager. He managed Arminia Bielefeld from 1966 to 1969.
