= Saša Janić =

Croatian German footballer

Personal information
- Date of birth: 7 May 1975 (age 51)
- Place of birth: Ulm, West Germany
- Height: 1.76 m (5 ft 9 in)
- Position: Defender

Youth career
- SSV Ulm 1846
- VfB Stuttgart

Senior career*
Years	Team	Apps	(Gls)
1994–1995	SpVgg Ludwigsburg		
1995–1996	Stuttgarter Kickers		
1996–2002	SSV Reutlingen		
2002–2003	Arminia Bielefeld	1	(0)
2003	SpVgg Unterhaching	7	(0)
2004–2006	FC Augsburg	18	(1)
2006–2008	SSV Reutlingen	58	(2)
2008–2009	Stuttgarter Kickers	6	(0)
- * Club domestic league appearances and goals

Saša Janić (born 7 May 1975) is a Croatian German former football player. He spent one season in the Bundesliga with Arminia Bielefeld.
