= Torjus Hansén =

Norwegian footballer (born 1973)

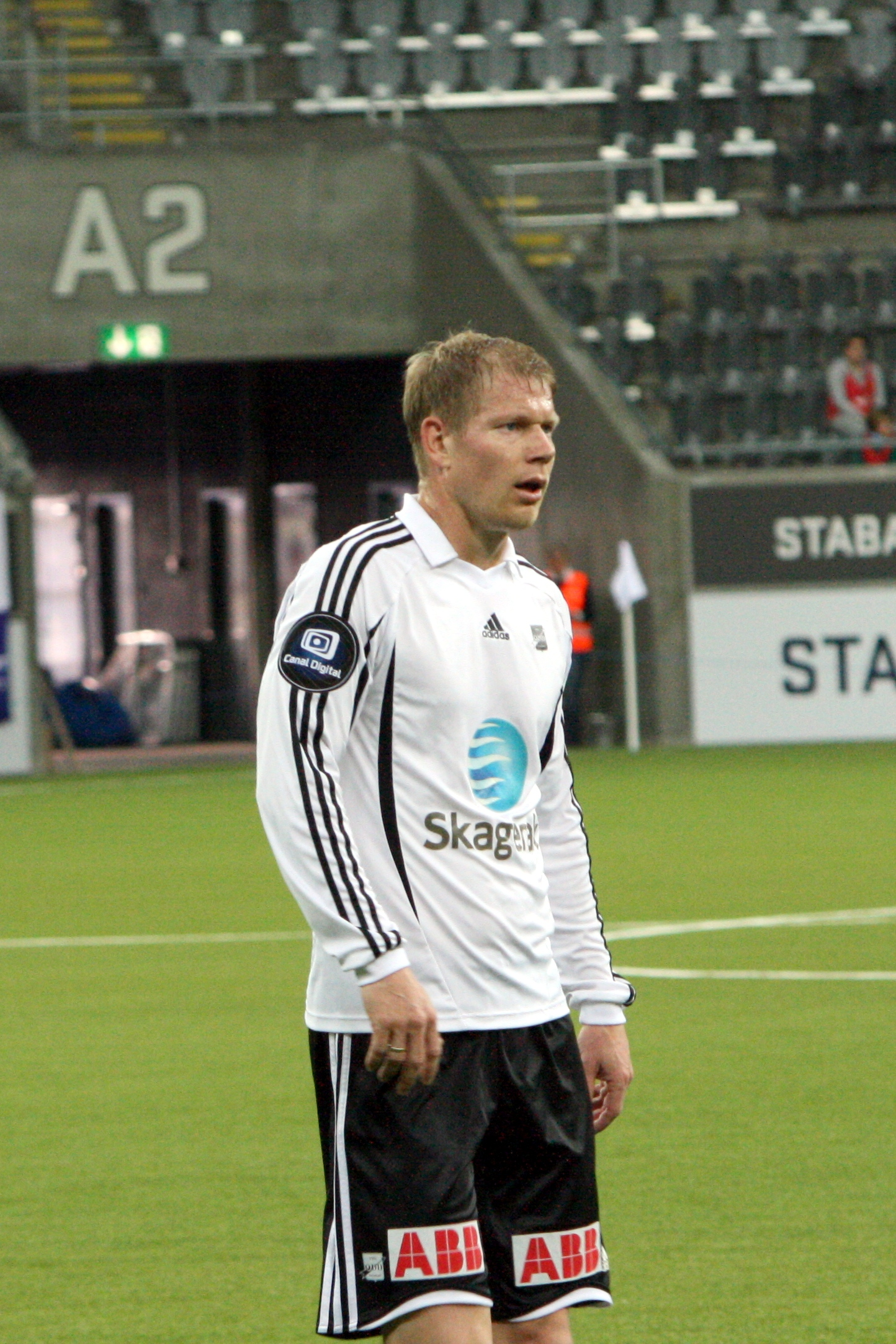

Personal information
- Date of birth: 29 October 1973 (age 53)
- Place of birth: Skien, Norway
- Height: 1.88 m (6 ft 2 in)
- Position: Defender

Youth career
- –1991: Gulset

Senior career*
Years	Team	Apps	(Gls)
1992–1998	Odd Grenland	123	(6)
1999–2002	Lillestrøm	86	(4)
2002–2003	Arminia Bielefeld	31	(0)
2003–2004	Rosenborg	11	(0)
2005–2011	Odd Grenland	123	(0)
2012-2019	Storm	10	(0)
Total		384	(10)

International career
	Norway U-21	3	(0)
2002–2003	Norway	3	(0)
- * Club domestic league appearances and goals

Torjus Hansén (born 29 October 1973) is a Norwegian former professional footballer who played as a defender.

== Club career ==
Hansén was born in Skien. He formerly played for Gulset, Lillestrøm, Arminia Bielefeld, and Rosenborg. For his last club Odd Grenland, has played total eleven seasons, and 267 matches and scoring 6 goals. He retired after the 2010 season. On 8 February 2011, he sign a contract until 1 August 2011. On 1 August 2011, he retired from football.

== International career ==
He also played three matches for the national team, and three for the under-21.
