= Jésus Sinisterra =

Colombian footballer (born 1975)

Jesús Sinisterra
Personal information
- Full name: Jesús Brahaman Sinisterra Arias
- Date of birth: December 9, 1975 (age 50)
- Place of birth: Quibdó, Colombia
- Height: 1.75 m (5 ft 9 in)
- Position: Defensive midfielder

Youth career
- –1995: Millonarios

Senior career*
| Years | Team | Apps | (Gls) |
| 1995–1996 | América de Cali | 2 | (0) |
| 1996–1997 | Deportivo Pereira | 39 | (7) |
| 1998 | Deportes Quindío | 30 | (0) |
| 1999 | Millonarios | 11 | (1) |
| 1999–2000 | Almagro | 54 | (4) |
| 2001–2002 | Banfield | 28 | (1) |
| 2002 | Arminia Bielefeld II | 5 | (0) |
| 2002–2004 | Arminia Bielefeld | 21 | (1) |
| 2005 | Eintracht Trier | 12 | (0) |
| 2006 | LR Ahlen | 8 | (0) |
| 2006–2007 | Nueva Chicago | 5 | (0) |
| 2007 | Deportes Tolima | 17 | (1) |
| 2007 | Deportivo Pasto | 13 | (1) |
| 2008 | Boyacá Chicó | 17 | (0) |
| 2008 | Deportivo Pereira | 22 | (0) |
| 2009 | Envigado | 5 | (0) |
| 2011 | Almagro | 1 | (1) |

International career
| 1996–2003 | Colombia | 3 | (0) |
- * Club domestic league appearances and goals

Jesús Brahaman Sinisterra Arias or simply Jesús Sinisterra or Brahaman Sinisterra (born December 9, 1975) is a Colombian former footballer who played as a defensive midfielder. He spent one season in the Bundesliga with Arminia Bielefeld.
