= Eckes-Granini Group =

European corporate group producing fruit juice

Eckes-Granini Group GmbH
- Industry: Beverage industry
- Founded: 1857
- Headquarters: Nieder-Olm, Germany
- Key people: Lars Wagener (CEO) Sidney Coffeng (CFO) German Heil (COO)
- Revenue: € 983 million (2023)
- Number of employees: 1,636 (FTE) (2023)
- Website: www.eckes-granini.com

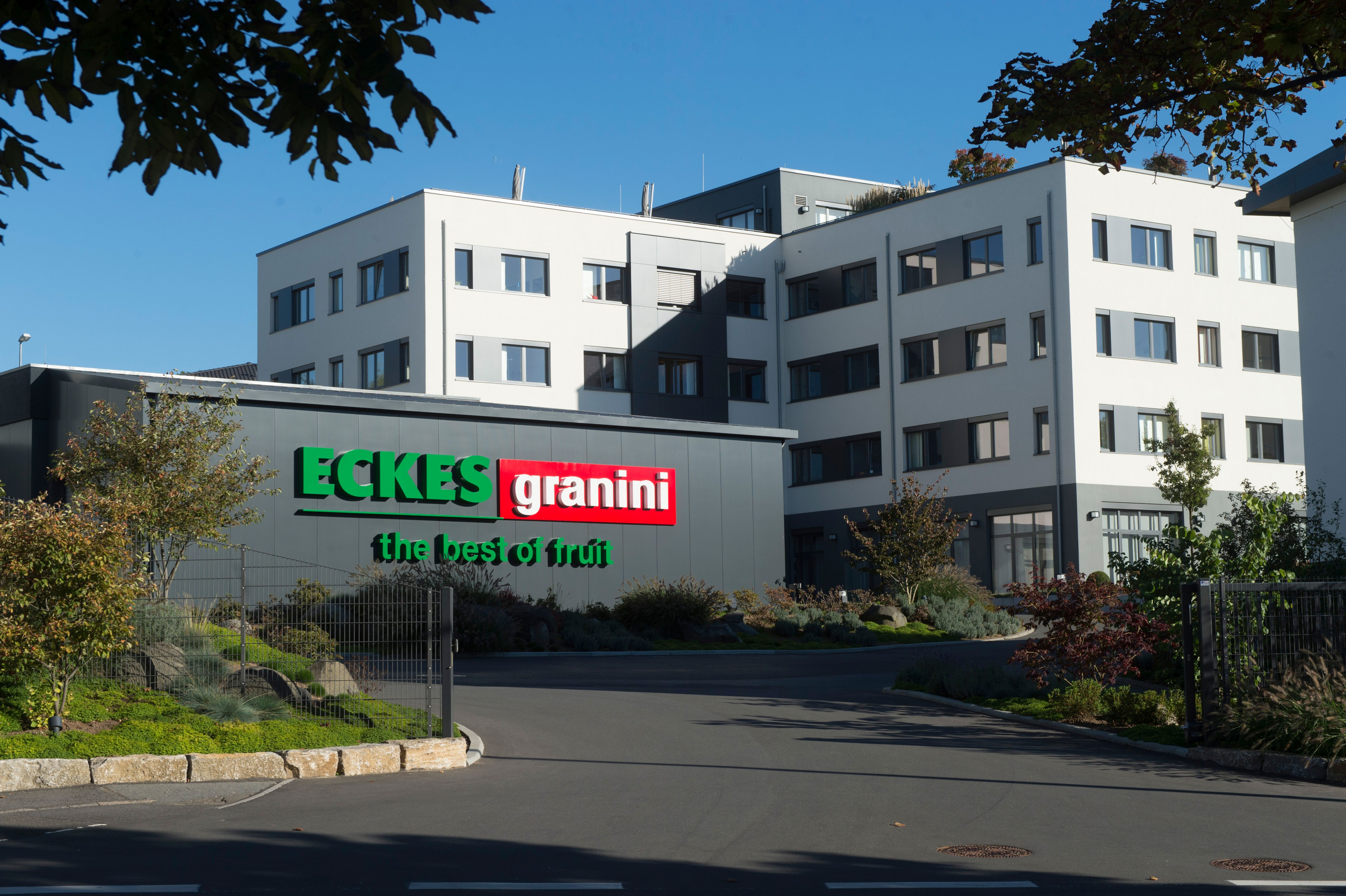
Eckes-Granini headquarters in Nieder-Olm, Germany (2018)

The Eckes-Granini Group GmbH is the largest corporate group specialized in the production of fruit juice in Europe. Eckes AG is based in Nieder-Olm in the Rhine-Hesse region and was once actively involved in beverage production, now serves as the group's financial holding company. Founded as a family-owned enterprise in 1857, Eckes AG has since sold off its German and international spirits business and focused exclusively on the production and sale of fruit beverages through the Eckes-Granini Group. Following the acquisition of the international brand Granini in 1994, Eckes-Granini GmbH & Co. KG was established as an independent producer and distributor of juices and fruit beverages.

== Corporate structure ==
The Eckes-Granini Group GmbH offers fruit juices, fruit beverages, fruit syrups, smoothies and fruit-based refreshment drinks for the food and beverage trade and the gastronomy sector in over 80 countries worldwide. In addition to Eckes-Granini Deutschland GmbH in Nieder-Olm, the group now has subsidiaries in France, Denmark, Sweden, Finland, Spain, Austria, Hungary, Lithuania and Switzerland, and also maintains sales partnerships in many other European and non-European countries. Its brand portfolio includes such globally popular brands as Granini and Pago as well as numerous leading national and regional brands, such as Joker in France and Sió in Hungary, to name only two. Eckes-Granini introduced Hohes C, the first ready-to-drink orange juice to Germany in the 1950s and a brand that is now familiar to consumers in Germany, Austria, Switzerland and Hungary.

== Origin and history ==
The history of the Eckes-Granini Group began in Nieder-Olm in the Rhineland-Palatinate, where the haulier and farmer Peter Eckes (1804-1873) founded a distillery for wine by-products in 1857.

The descendants of Peter Eckes proceeded to expand the existing farming and distillery activities. Spirits, grapevine oil and pure tartar production operations were complemented in 1922 by sales of semi-finished products for further processing. Inspired by the idea of introducing the American culture of orange juice consumption to Germany, the company also began producing and marketing fruit juices in the 1920s. In support of that goal, Ludwig Eckes recruited Julius Koch, the Director of the Institut für Obst- und Gemüseverwertung at the Forschungsanstalt Geisenheim, and established a beverage research institute for him in Nieder-Olm. The hohes C brand was entered in the Trademark Register in November 1957, and introduced to the market as the first ready-to-drink orange juice in bottles in 1958.

The company continued its production of spirits as well. One of the most well-known German brandies was sold under the name of Ludwig Eckes' wife, Marianne Eckes-Chantré. In 1961, the company also introduced Zinn 40, a clear spirit made from wine. Another innovation was the launch of Criss in 1974, which paved the way for a new market segment. After the reunification of Germany, Eckes acquired the traditional Nordhäuser distillery (Nordbrand Nordhausen) and relocated part of its spirits production facility.

International expansion became an important element of the group's business strategy in the 1990s. The Eckes-Granini Group GmbH took over SIÓ-Eckes (Hungary) in 1993. A year later, the Group acquired 74 per cent interest in the Melitta Group, and in 2006, the Group took over the company entirely. and acquired 74-percent interest in granini from the Melitta Group a year later, before completing the buyout in 2006. In 1995, Eckes purchased its Italian competitor, Stock Spa. The subsidiary, Eckes & Stock GmbH, was among the leading producers of branded spirits in Germany, Austria, Slovakia, the Czech Republic and Italy, with a portfolio of brands including Chantré, Mariacron, Grappa Julia and Stroh Inländer Rum.

In subsequent years, the company leveraged these familiar brand names to support the introduction of various international branded wine lines, including Collection de Chantré (French wines), Mederano de Freixenet (Spanish wines) and Passione di JULIA (Italian wines). The group marketed Cava in Germany through a joint venture with Freixenet until 2006.

During this period, several prominent juice producers from different regions of Europe joined the Eckes-Granini Group. In 2001, Marli, producer of Finland’s leading fruit juice brand, became a subsidiary of Eckes-Granini. In 1998, Eckes-Granini acquired the French fruit beverage producer Joker and Les Vergers d’Alsace, which merged in 2002 to form Eckes-Granini France, featuring the granini, Joker and Réa brands. That same year, Eckes-Granini Austria was founded as a fully owned subsidiary of the Eckes-Granini Group.

Eckes-Granini reoriented its business in 2006, and has since focused exclusively on fruit juices and fruit beverages. The German spirits division was sold to Rotkäppchen-Mumm Sektkellereien and thus remains in part a family enterprise, as majority interest in Rotkäppchen-Mumm is held by the Harald Eckes-Chantré family, one of the four branches of the Eckes family. The acquisition of fruit beverage producer Elmenhorster of Lithuania followed in 2006. In 2007, Eckes-Granini sold the remaining international segment of its spirits business to the investor Oaktree Capital Management. That marked the complete withdrawal of the Eckes-Granini Group from the spirits business under the direction of Eckes AG and the Eckes-Granini Group GmbH. Eckes-Granini acquired Brämhults Juice AB, a Swedish producer of fruit juices, that same year.

The group purchased the Austrian fruit juice producer Pago from Brau Union Österreich AG in 2012 and Rynkeby Food A/S of Denmark in 2016.[10] Eckes-Granini also acquired 35% interest in the smoothie producer True Fruits in 2018.

== Brands & products ==
The Eckes-Granini Group offers only fruit juices and fruit-based products today. The portfolio includes (share of total revenue in 2021 in brackets):

- Granini (20 %) – international
- Pago (7 %) – international
- Hohes C (20 %) – Austria, Hungary, Germany, Spain and Switzerland
- Joker (13 %) – France
- Yo (3 %) – Austria, Czech Republic, Germany
- God Morgon (8 %) – Denmark, Finland and Sweden
- Brämhults (3 %) – Denmark, Finland and Sweden
- Rynkeby (6 %) – Denmark and Sweden
- Marli (3 %) – Finland
- Sió (3 %) – Hungary
- Elmenhorster (1 %) – Lithuania
- Mehukatti ( < 1 %) – Finland
