= Walter Claus-Oehler =

German footballer

Personal information
- Date of birth: 7 May 1897
- Place of birth: Gera, Germany
- Date of death: 8 November 1941 (aged 44)
- Place of death: Rennes, German-occupied France
- Position: Midfielder

Senior career*
Years	Team	Apps	(Gls)
1918–1935	Arminia Bielefeld		

International career
1923	Germany	2	(1)
- * Club domestic league appearances and goals

Walter Claus-Oehler (7 May 1897 – 8 November 1941) was a German footballer who played as a midfielder for Arminia Bielefeld and the Germany national team.

== Personal life ==
Claus-Oehler served as a Hauptmann (captain) in the German Army during the Second World War and died on active service on 8 November 1941. He is buried in Mont-de-Huisnes German war cemetery.
