= Maciej Murawski =

Polish footballer (born 1974)

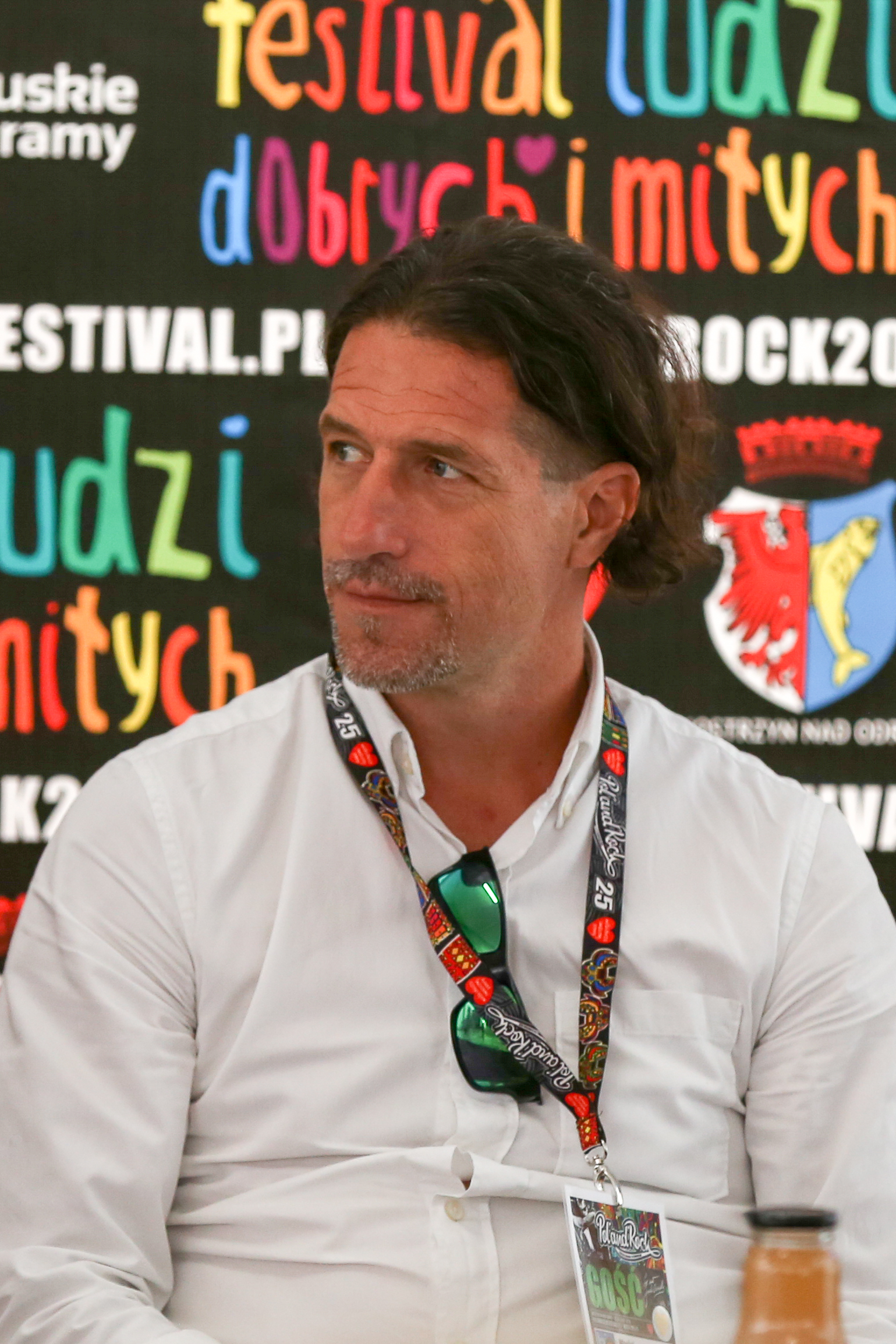
- Murawski in 2019

Personal information
- Date of birth: 20 February 1974 (age 52)
- Place of birth: Zielona Góra, Poland
- Height: 1.84 m (6 ft 0 in)
- Position: Defender

Senior career*
Years	Team	Apps	(Gls)
1991–1992	Zryw Zielona Góra		
1992–1996	Ślęza Wrocław		
1996–1997	Polonia Bytom		
1997–1998	Lech Poznań	30	(1)
1998–2002	Legia Warsaw	112	(1)
2002–2004	Arminia Bielefeld	22	(0)
2004–2005	Aris	23	(2)
2005–2009	Apollon Kalamarias	47	(1)
2009	Cracovia	1	(0)

International career
1998–2002	Poland	6	(0)

Managerial career
- 2009–2010: Lechia Zielona Góra
- 2010–2011: Zawisza Bydgoszcz
- * Club domestic league appearances and goals

Maciej Murawski (Polish pronunciation: [ˈmat͡ɕɛj muˈrafskʲi]) (born 20 February 1974) is a Polish former professional footballer who played as a defender and midfielder. He is currently the chairman of Lechia Zielona Góra.

== Club career ==
Born in Zielona Góra, Murawski began his playing career with hometown club Zryw, before moving to Śląsk Wrocław in 1992. He subsequently played for Polonia Bytom before joining Lech Poznań in 1997. Primarily playing as a midfielder at the time, he made 30 appearances and scored one goal for Lech Poznań during the 1997–98 season.

In 1998, he moved to Legia Warsaw. Murawski spent four seasons at Legia, making 146 appearances in official competitions and scoring one goal. Although he was primarily deployed as a defender, he also played as a defensive midfielder. On 25 July 1998, he made his debut for Legia in a match against Zagłębie Lubin. During the 2001–02 season, he helped the club win the Ekstraklasa title and the Polish League Cup.

In the summer of 2002, he moved to Germany to join Bundesliga club Arminia Bielefeld. He spent two seasons in Germany, playing in the Bundesliga during his first season before experiencing the club's relegation to the 2. Bundesliga in the following campaign. In 2004, he moved to Greece, joining Aris Thessaloniki F.C., where he spent one season.

In 2005, he joined fellow Greek club Apollon Kalamarias F.C.. He played for the club for several seasons and also served as its captain. After spending around four years in Greece, he returned to Poland in 2009 and joined Cracovia. However, he made only one appearance for the club and retired from professional football at the end of the 2009 season.

== International career ==
Murawski was first called up to the Poland national team in 1998 and made one appearance that year. He subsequently played in a friendly against the Netherlands in June 2000 and made four appearances in 2002, bringing his total to six international appearances.

Murawski was included in Poland's 23-man squad for the 2002 FIFA World Cup. He did not feature in Poland's opening group-stage match against the South Korea or their second match against the Portugal, but started the final group-stage match against the United States, playing the full 90 minutes. Poland won the match 3–1.

He continued to represent Poland after the World Cup. In a friendly against the Belgium on 21 August 2002, he started the match and played until the 21st minute of the second half. The match ended in a 1–1 draw.

Murawski made no further appearances for the national team after 2002, finishing his international career with six caps and no goals.

== Post-playing career ==
Following retirement, he worked as a manager for clubs Lechia Zielona Góra and Zawisza Bydgoszcz. From 2012, he is a TV analyst and pundit, mostly known for his work for Polish Canal+.

== Career statistics ==
=== International ===
Appearances and goals by national team and year
National team	Year	Apps	Goals
Poland
Poland	1998	1	0
Poland	2001	1	0
Poland	2002	4	0
Total		6	0

== Honours ==
Legia Warsaw

- Ekstraklasa: 2001–02
- Polish League Cup: 2001–02
