= Frank Geideck =

German footballer and coach

Personal information
- Date of birth: 2 April 1967 (age 59)
- Place of birth: Bielefeld, West Germany
- Height: 1.78 m (5 ft 10 in)
- Position: Midfielder

Team information
- Current team: Bournemouth (assistant coach)

Youth career
- Arminia Bielefeld

Senior career*
Years	Team	Apps	(Gls)
–1988	VfR Wellensiek		
1988–1996	Arminia Bielefeld	157	(10)

Managerial career
- 1994–2005: Arminia Bielefeld (assistant)
- 2005: Arminia Bielefeld (caretaker)
- 2005–2007: Arminia Bielefeld (assistant)
- 2007: Arminia Bielefeld
- 2007–2009: Arminia Bielefeld (assistant)
- 2009–2022: Borussia Mönchengladbach (assistant)
- 2022–2025: RB Leipzig (assistant)
- 2026–: Bournemouth (assistant)
- * Club domestic league appearances and goals

Frank Geideck (born 2 April 1967) is a German football coach and a former player. He is the assistant coach of Marco Rose at Bournemouth.
