= Steffen Süßner =

German footballer (born 1977)

Personal information
- Date of birth: 26 September 1977 (age 49)
- Place of birth: Germany
- Position: Goalkeeper

Youth career
- Chemnitzer FC

Senior career*
Years	Team	Apps	(Gls)
2006	Chemnitzer FC		
2006–2008	FC Sachsen Leipzig		
2008	Erzgebirge Aue		
2008–2009	Floriana FC		

Managerial career
- 2012-: FSV Zwickau (goalkeeper coach)
- * Club domestic league appearances and goals

Steffen Süßner (born 26 September 1977) is a German former professional football goalkeeper who works as goalkeeper coach at FSV Zwickau.

== Career ==
Süßner started his senior career with Chemnitzer FC. After that, he played for German clubs Sachsen Leipzig and Erzgebirge Aue and Maltese club Floriana before retiring in 2009.
