= Fatmir Vata =

Albanian footballer

Personal information
- Full name: Fatmir Vata
- Date of birth: 20 September 1971 (age 55)
- Place of birth: Macukull, Mat, Albania
- Height: 1.70 m (5 ft 7 in)
- Position: Attacking midfielder

Youth career
- KF Reshen

Senior career*
Years	Team	Apps	(Gls)
1990–1991	31 Korriku		
1991–1993	Tirana		
1993–1995	Orijent		
1995–1998	Samobor	26+	(5+)
1998–1999	Slaven Belupo	11	(1)
1999	Vukovar '91	13	(2)
2000–2001	Waldhof Mannheim	47	(14)
2001–2007	Arminia Bielefeld	128	(19)
2007–2009	TuS Koblenz	44	(5)
2009–2010	Wuppertaler SV	15	(1)
2013–2014	FC 08 Boffzen		

International career
1996–2002	Albania	17	(0)

Managerial career
- 2016–2018: FC Gütersloh
- * Club domestic league appearances and goals

Fatmir Vata (born 20 September 1971) is an Albanian former professional footballer who played primarily as an attacking midfielder. He began his footballing career with local side 31 Korriku, before moving to Tirana in 1991 where he would remain for two seasons before moving abroad. He joined Croatian club Orijent before moving to Samobor two years later in 1995, where he'd remain for three seasons. Vata joined Prva HNL side Slaven Belupo and spent one season with the club before moving to Vukovar '91. He joined newly promoted 2. Bundesliga and German side Waldhof Mannheim in January 2000 where he established himself in the first team and helped the side to a fourth-place finish in the 2000–01 2. Bundesliga, just one point behind automatic promotion.

Vata is best known for his time at Arminia Bielefeld, which he joined in 2001 and helped the club promotion to the Bundesliga in 2002. Despite suffering relegation back to 2. Bundesliga, he helped his side achieve promotion once again the following year. He left the club at the end of the 2006–07 season after 140 games and 20 goals, making him the current third-highest foreign appearance maker for the club. Vata moved to 2. Bundesliga side TuS Koblenz where he spent two years before joining 3. Liga side Wuppertaler SV in 2009, where he retired at the end of the 2009–10 season.

He came out of retirement to play for amateur side FC 08 Boffzen in 2013.

== Club career ==
Vata was born in Rrëshen, Albania to a Catholic family.

In 2004, he became Albania's Footballer of the Year.

In August 2009, Vata joined Wuppertaler SV from TuS Koblenz for the 2009–10 season on a free transfer.

== International career ==
He made his debut for Albania in an April 1996 friendly match against Bosnia and earned a total of 17 caps, scoring no goals. His final international was an October 2002 European Championship qualification match against Russia.

=== International statistics ===
Albania national team
Year	Apps	Goals
1996	4	0
1997	2	0
1998	0	0
1999	0	0
2000	2	0
2001	7	0
2002	2	0
Total	17	0

== Post-playing career ==
Following his retirement Vata worked as a coach for Hannover 96 and VfL Bochum.

== Honours ==
Individual

- Albania's Footballer of the Year: 2004
