= Horst Franz =

German football manager

Personal information
- Date of birth: 17 June 1940 (age 86)

Managerial career
- Years: Team
- 1972–1973: First Vienna
- 1973–1974: FC Wacker Innsbruck
- 1974–1975: SC Eisenstadt
- 1975–1976: VÖEST Linz
- 1977–1980: Union Solingen
- 1980–1982: Arminia Bielefeld
- 1982–1983: Karlsruher SC
- 1983–1984: Borussia Dortmund
- 1986: Arminia Bielefeld
- 1987: Rot-Weiss Essen
- 1987–1988: Schalke 04
- 1995: Mainz 05
- 2002: SV Babelsberg 03

Horst Franz (born 17 June 1940) is a German football manager. His son Sascha Franz is also a football coach.

He began his coaching career in Austria.
