= Arminia Bielefeld =

Association football club in Germany

- Full name: Deutscher Sportclub Arminia Bielefeld e. V.
- Nicknames: Die Arminen, Die Blauen (The Blues)
- Founded: 3 May 1905; 121 years ago as 1. Bielefelder FC Arminia
- Stadium: SchücoArena
- Capacity: 27,332
- President: Rainer Kobusch
- Head coach: Oliver Kirch
- League: 2. Bundesliga
- 2025–26: 2. Bundesliga, 13th of 18
- Website: www.arminia.de
Home colours	Away colours

Deutscher Sportclub Arminia Bielefeld e. V. (pronounced [ˌdeːʔɛsˈtseː ʔaʁˈmiːni̯a ˈbiːləfɛlt]; full name: Deutscher Sportclub Arminia Bielefeld e.V. [ˈdɔʏtʃɐ ˈʃpɔʁtklʊp ʔaʁˈmiːni̯a ˈbiːləfɛlt]; commonly known as Arminia Bielefeld (German pronunciation: [aʁˌmiːnia ˈbiːləfɛlt]), also known as Die Arminen [diː ˈʔaʁmiːnən] or Die Blauen [diː ˈblaʊən]), or just Arminia (pronounced [aʁˌmiːnia]), is a German sports club from Bielefeld, North Rhine-Westphalia. Arminia is best known as a professional football club, having competed in the first-tier Bundesliga for a total of 19 seasons. It currently plays in the 2. Bundesliga after winning promotion in the 2024–25 3. Liga season. The club also operates field hockey, figure skating and cue sports departments.

Arminia won two West German Championships, in 1922 and 1923. They were also successful in the 1980s and 2000s, having played five consecutive years in the Bundesliga in each of those decades. Arminia have earned a reputation as a yo-yo club (Fahrstuhlmannschaft) for their frequent promotions and relegations. They had prolonged spells in regional third-tier football in the 1950s and early 1990s, but have also been promoted to the Bundesliga eight times, and most recently played in the Bundesliga in 2021–22. The team reached the final of the DFB-Pokal for the first time in 2025, but lost 4–2 to Stuttgart.

Arminia's colours are black, white and blue. They have played home games at the Bielefelder Alm Stadium since 1926. The stadium's current capacity of 27,332 includes 7,940 as terracing and 19,392 seats. Since 2004, Bielefelder Alm has been named SchücoArena through a sponsorship deal. The club's supporters primarily originate from the Ostwestfalen-Lippe region, and supporters' groups primarily congregate in Bielefelder Alm's south stand during matches. Arminia's longest-standing rivalry is with SC Preußen Münster, a club from western Westphalia.

== History ==
Logo of founding side 1. FC Arminia Bielefeld

=== Founding and early years (1905–1918) ===
Arminia Bielefeld was founded on 3 May 1905 as 1. Bielefelder FC Arminia. The fourteen men who founded the club were from the local bourgeoisie. Arminia's name derives from the Cheruscan chieftain Arminius, who defeated a Roman army in the Battle of the Teutoburg Forest. Two weeks later, the club played its first match against a team from Osnabrück. Neither the name of the opponent nor the result are known. The club was admitted to the German Football Association in the same year and started to play in a league (in one consisting only of Arminia and three teams from Osnabrück, at first) in 1906. In 1907, local rivals FC Siegfried joined Arminia, a move which strengthened Arminia's squad. Soon other clubs from Bielefeld joined League football.

After playing on various grounds, Arminia moved to a new home at the Pottenau in 1910. Their first league championship came during the 1912–13 season, when they won the Westphalian championship beating BV 04 Dortmund 5–1 in the final. The outbreak of World War I interrupted Arminia's rise, and between 1914 and 1918 the club played at the district level.

=== West German Champions and "The Alm" (1918–1933) ===
In 1919, Arminia merged with Bielefelder Turngemeinde 1848 to form TG Arminia Bielefeld. However, the two merged teams dissolved the merger in 1922 and both parent clubs were formed again. Arminia won the West German championship in 1922. Originally, they were level on points with Kölner BC 01, but Köln fielded an ineligible player in one match. Arminia played for the first time in the German Championships, but were eliminated in the quarter-finals after losing 5–0 to FC Wacker München. In 1923, Arminia won their second West German championship in a dramatic way. They trailed TuRU Düsseldorf 3–1 at half time of the final, but came from behind to win 4–3 after extra time. Arminia faced Union Oberschöneweide in the quarter-finals of the German championships. The match ended goalless, so a replay was held. Arminia led 1–0 and conceded the equalizer in injury time. The Berlin side won the match after extra time. Walter Claus-Oehler became Arminia's first player to win a cap in the German national team. Arminia won further Westphalian titles from 1924 to 1927, but were unable to repeat their success in the West German Championships. An away match against SC Preußen Münster in November 1925, which Arminia won 5–0, was the first football match to be broadcast on German Radio. On 30 January 1926, the club took its current name Deutscher Sportclub Arminia Bielefeld. Their next piece of silverware was won in 1932 by winning the Westphalian cup.

=== Arminia during the Nazi regime (1933–1945) ===
In 1933, Arminia qualified for the Gauliga Westfalen, from which they were relegated after the inaugural season. Three attempts of gaining promotion failed before their return to the top flight was won in 1938. Their best performance in the Gauliga was the 1939–40 campaign, where Arminia finished second. Two years later, Arminia was one of only two teams to win a match at Schalke 04. On 25 July 1943 Arminia merged with local rivals VfB 03 Bielefeld. The merger finished the 1943–44 season in last place.

=== Post World War II years (1945–1962) ===
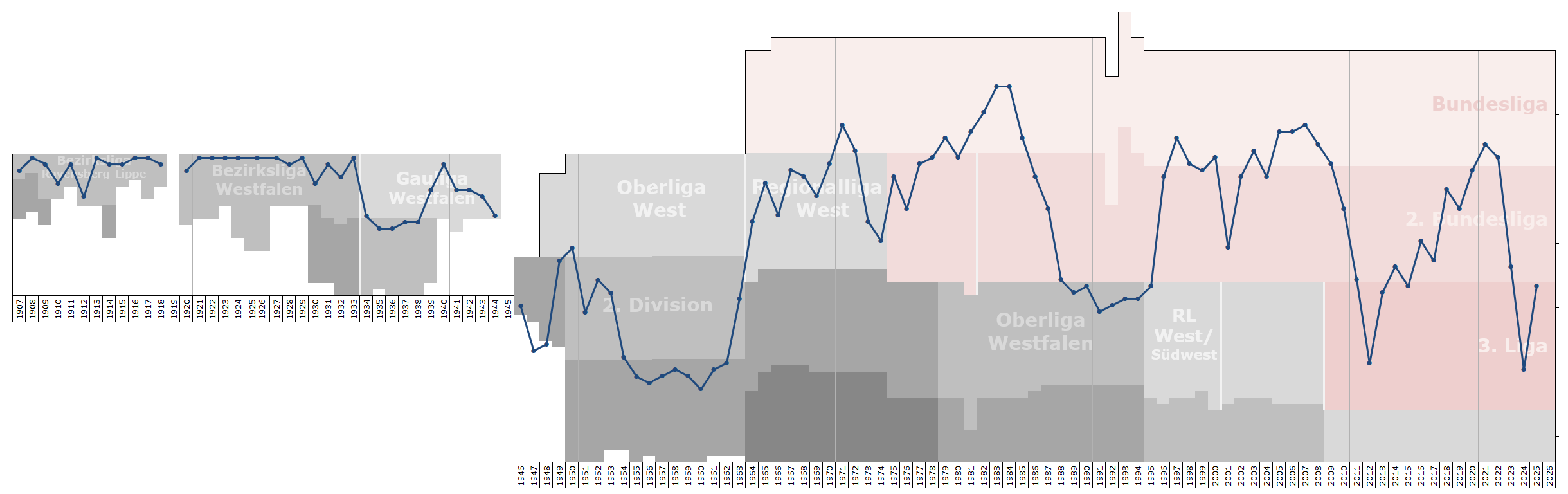
Historical chart of Arminia Bielefeld league performance

After World War II, a new league with all teams who competed in the Gauliga Westfalen was formed. Arminia were relegated and were unable to win re-promotion. In 1947–48, Arminia were a third division side for the first time in their history. After a dominating season in the Bezirksklasse, Arminia was docked 14 points because they fielded an ineligible player. The next season was already under way when the Landesliga (II) was expanded by two teams. Arminia took their chance, won the league and gained promotion to the Oberliga West.

Arminia's time in the Oberliga lasted only one season. Arminia beat Schalke 04 4–2 at home but finished only second from the bottom. In 1954, Arminia were even relegated to the third tier, the "Landesliga Westfalen, Gruppe Ostwestfalen", a league only covering the north-eastern part of Westphalia. In 1956, Arminia qualified for a new third tier, the "Verbandsliga Westfalen, Gruppe Ostwestfalen", which encompassed a slightly larger area.

=== Promotion to the Bundesliga (1962–1970) ===
In 1962 Arminia become a second division side again (then: 2. Liga West, covering the whole of North Rhine-Westphalia). In 1962–63 they finished in seventh place to secure a spot in the newly formed Regionalliga West, which was situated directly below the new Bundesliga.

Arminia finished their first season in mid-table, but recorded a top-half finish in four of the following five seasons. In 1966, Arminia beat Alemannia Aachen to win the West German Cup for the first time. The following year, the forward Ernst Kuster joined the team. He went on to become the club's all-time leading goalscorer, until Fabian Klos beat his record more than half a century later. A 1–0 loss to Wuppertaler SV on the last day of the 1966–67 season stopped Arminia entering the Bundesliga promotion play-offs. Arminia were runners-up in the 1969–70 season, and won their first promotion to the Bundesliga after a 2–0 win at Tennis Borussia Berlin in the play-offs.

=== Bundesliga scandal and return (1970–1980) ===
Halfway through their first Bundesliga season, Arminia were in 17th place, a relegation position, but went on to finish the season in 14th. However, near the end of the season, the president of Kickers Offenbach, Horst-Gregorio Canellas, revealed that Arminia and several other clubs had engaged in match-fixing. Three of the ten Bundesliga games proven by the DFB to have been manipulated through bribery directly involved Arminia. Two players at the club were banned from football for life (Waldemar Słomiany and Jürgen Neumann). Arminia participated in the 1971–72 Bundesliga season while the investigation was ongoing, and finished in last place, but were found guilty of match-fixing by the DFB and were denied a licence and forcibly relegated at the end of the season. Arminia finished mid-table in the following seasons, but did qualify for the newly formed 2. Bundesliga in 1974.

After returning to the 2. Bundesliga in 1974, Arminia became Herbstmeister during the 1976–77 2. Bundesliga season, but finished as runners-up behind St. Pauli and faced 1860 Munich in a two-legged promotion play-off. Arminia won the first match at home 4–0, but lost the second leg in Munich, also 4–0. A third match had to be played in Frankfurt, which Munich won 2–0.

The team recovered to win promotion to the Bundesliga for the 1978–79 season. Under the management of Otto Rehhagel, they won 4–0 at Bayern Munich on 10 March 1979, but finished in 16th place, unable to avoid relegation. The club kept the team together and were immediately promoted back to the Bundesliga after a record-breaking 1979–80 season. They won 30 of 38 matches, scored 120 goals, had a 28 match unbeaten streak and set a league record by beating Arminia Hannover 11–0.

=== Establishment in the Bundesliga (1980–1985) ===
Arminia had difficulty avoiding relegation, but stayed in the Bundesliga for five years. This period included two eighth-place finishes at the end of the 1982–83 and 1983–84 seasons, which remain Arminia's best finishes in the Bundesliga. Arminia also took part in the UEFA Intertoto Cup three times.

In August 1981, the Arminia Bielefeld midfielder Ewald Lienen was the victim of what the press referred to as "the most brutal foul in Bundesliga history". Werder Bremen's defender Norbert Siegmann slashed Lienen's right thigh in a tackle, exposing his muscles and femur. Attendances declined in the mid-1980s, increasing the club's financial problems. In 1984–85, Arminia finished third from bottom, and lost a relegation play-off against 1. FC Saarbrücken.

=== Decline to the Oberliga (1985–1994) ===
By the autumn of 1987, Arminia had debts of 4.5 million Marks. In 1987–88 they finished in last place in the 2. Bundesliga and were relegated into the Oberliga Westfalen. Ernst Middendorp became the new manager and assembled a young team for the next season. Arminia finished second in the Oberliga in 1988–89. They won the Oberliga a year later, but failed to advance after promotion play-offs against VfB Oldenburg and TSV Havelse. Four seasons of not qualifying for the 2. Bundesliga promotion play-offs followed, in which the team started well, but were unable to compete for the championship. In 1991, Arminia won the Westphalian Cup, the regional qualification cup for the DFB-Pokal, and beat FSV Mainz 05 in the first round of the 1991–92 DFB-Pokal.

=== Resurgence and yo-yo era (1994–2004) ===
In the spring of 1994, Arminia signed the veteran Bundesliga players Thomas von Heesen, Armin Eck and Fritz Walter. Arminia struggled at first but went on to become champions of the newly formed Regionalliga West/Südwest to end a run of seven seasons in local league football. They were then runners-up in the 1995–96 2. Bundesliga. Arminia signed Stefan Kuntz for the 1996–97 Bundesliga season, their first in 11 years and finished in 14th position.

In 1997, the club signed the first two Iranian Bundesliga players, Ali Daei and Karim Bagheri. The former SK Brann player Geirmund Brendesæter was also signed, and played 13 matches for the club. However, after a poor run after the winter break, Arminia were relegated shortly after Brendesæter had left the club. Bruno Labbadia became the league's top scorer with 28 goals during the 1998–99 season and the club immediately regained promotion to the Bundesliga by winning the 2. Bundesliga. The club entered the 1999–2000 season with a smaller budget due to financial problems and was subsequently relegated after becoming the third team in history to lose ten matches in a row.

Arminia struggled against relegation again the next season but avoided dropping into the Regionalliga with a 13th-place finish. The following year, Arminia they won their sixth promotion to the Bundesliga in 2001–02 by finishing second behind Hannover 96, with Artur Wichniarek scoring 18 goals. Arminia were unable to avoid relegation the following season, earning only two points from the last six matches. Arminia's tendency to move frequently between divisions during and since this period has led to them being described as a Fahrstuhlmannschaft, or yo-yo club.

=== Bundesliga reestablishment (2004–2009) ===
The team earned promotion to the Bundesliga again in 2003–04, with the Ghanaian striker Isaac Boakye scoring 14 goals in his debut season. They stayed in the top flight until 2009. In 2004–05, Patrick Owomoyela became Arminia's most capped German player with his third appearance for the national team. Owomoyela went on to appear in six internationals while at Bielefeld, a club record. Owomoyela and Delron Buckley, who scored of 15 Bundesliga goals during the 2004–05 season, left the club in 2005. Arminia reached the semi-finals of the DFB-Pokal in both 2005 and 2006, losing to Bayern Munich and Eintracht Frankfurt respectively. The campaign "Aktion 5000 +" began to increase club membership beyond their 5,000th member, after reaching this milestone at the end of 2005.

Arminia finished 13th in the Bundesliga in both 2004–05 and 2005–06. Players from this team subsequently left the club, including Fatmir Vata and Heiko Westermann in 2007, and Mathias Hain, Sibusiso Zuma and Petr Gabriel in 2008. Under Ernst Middendorp, Arminia avoided relegation during the 2006–07 season after winning four consecutive matches towards the end of the season. The 2007 demolition of the East Stand drew the attention of fans and the local media, with the club establishing a webcam to follow the project, as well as a daily attendance of roughly 300 fans to witness the works. The East Stand was notable at the time as being the last touchline terraced stand.

The 2007–08 season began with three wins in the first five matches, but three matches later Arminia recorded their second largest Bundesliga defeat when they lost 8–1 away to Werder Bremen. Relegation was avoided on the final day of the season as 1. FC Nürnberg lost at home while Arminia drew against VfB Stuttgart. The following season, Arminia finished in last place and were relegated to the 2. Bundesliga.

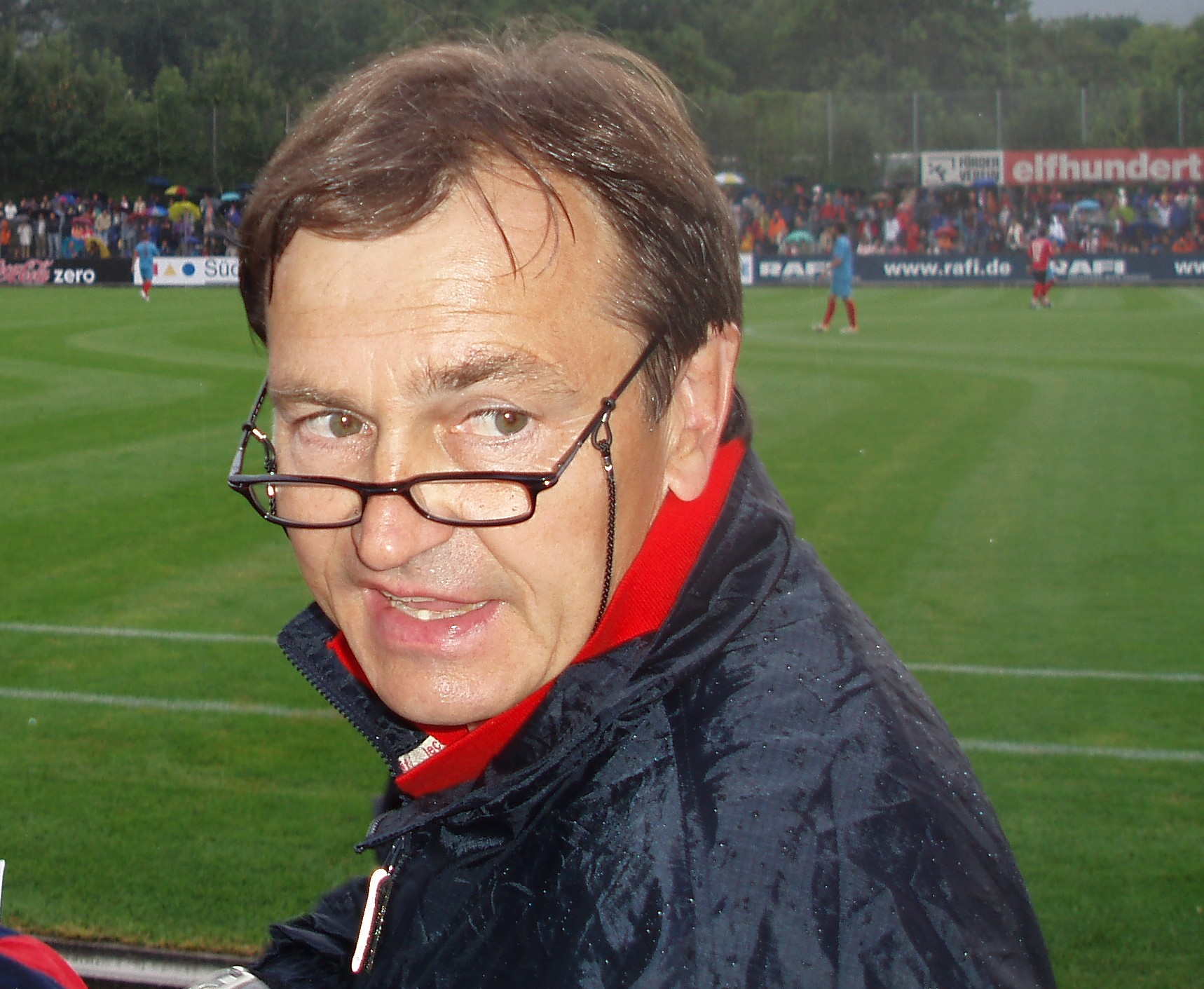
Ewald Lienen coached the team for most parts of the 2010–11 season.

=== Financial trouble and 3. Liga (2009–2015) ===
Rüdiger Kauf, Dennis Eilhoff, Jonas Kamper and Radim Kučera remained a part of the squad for the 2009–10 2. Bundesliga season. On 16 March 2010, Arminia were deducted four points for breaching the DFL's licensing regulations, and finished the season in seventh place. The financial situation worsened, especially as costs for constructing the East Stand had proven to be much higher than originally planned. The coach, the managing director and the president were replaced in the summer. The 2010–11 season started with Arminia in last place after 11 matches, with only four points. In November, their manager Christian Ziege was replaced by Ewald Lienen, the former Bielefeld player and member of the fan-voted "Best XI" of all time. However, Arminia picked up 16 points and won only four games all season, resulting in a last-place finish and relegation to the 3. Liga.

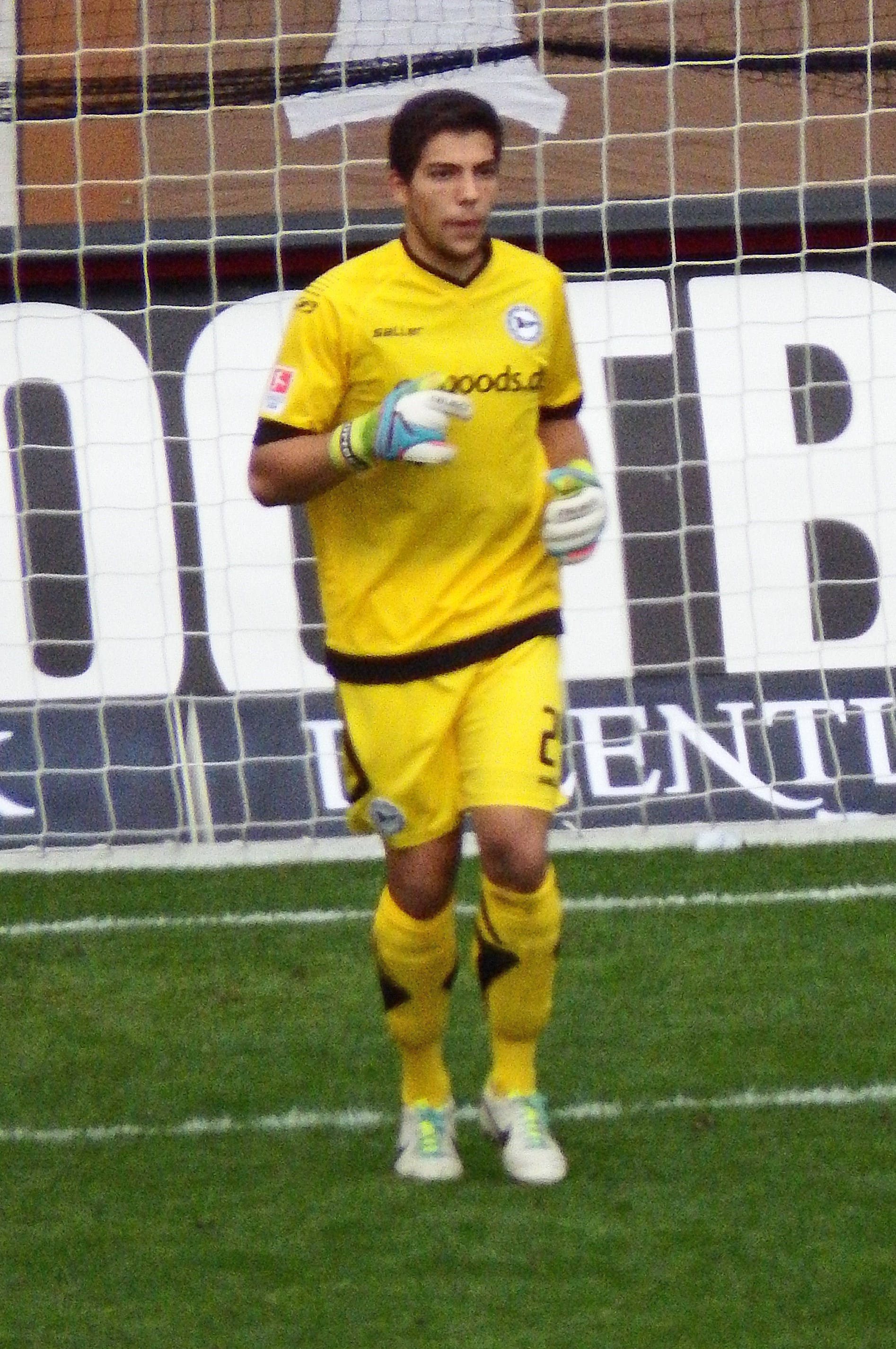
Stefan Ortega Moreno in the 2013–14 season

For the 2011–12 season, a new team was formed with players including Patrick Platins, Manuel Hornig, Tom Schütz, Sebastian Hille, Thomas Hübener, Patrick Schönfeld, Johannes Rahn and Fabian Klos. Stefan Ortega Moreno joined from the club's youth team. After a poor start, they finished 13th but won the Westphalia Cup, beating Preußen Münster in the final. This qualified Arminia for the 2012–13 DFB-Pokal, where they beat the 2. Bundesliga team SC Paderborn 07, but lost in the second round against Bayer Leverkusen. On 11 May 2013, Bielefeld beat VfL Osnabrück 1–0 to guarantee a top two finish and promotion back to the 2. Bundesliga for the 2013–14 season.

In 2013–14, Arminia qualified for the second round of the DFB-Pokal again, but declining league form led their coach Stefan Krämer – the first manager to have held office for more than two years since 2004 – to depart. Under his successor, Norbert Meier, Arminia finished 16th, and lost a relegation play-off against SV Darmstadt 98 on away goals after a late extra-time goal.

In the 2014–15 DFB-Pokal, as a 3. Liga club, Arminia defeated three Bundesliga teams (Hertha Berlin, Werder Bremen and Borussia Mönchengladbach) to reach the semi-finals, where they lost to Wolfsburg. They also gained promotion back to the 2. Bundesliga after a 2–2 draw against Jahn Regensburg and went on to secure the title in their last match.

=== Sporting and financial recovery (2015–2020) ===
In 2015–16 Arminia lost in the first round of the DFB-Pokal and recorded 18 draws in the league. Their 4–2 win over Greuther Fürth, only their third win at home that season, ensured survival in a season when they finished 12th and drew away against the league's top three teams. After the season, the coach Norbert Meier was bought by SV Darmstadt 98. Two managers were sacked in the 2016–17 season but Arminia avoided relegation as they finished in 15th after a 6–0 win over promotion candidates Eintracht Braunschweig and a 1–1 draw against Dynamo Dresden in their last two matches. They reached the quarter-finals of the DFB-Pokal where they lost to Eintracht Frankfurt.

The 2017–18 season turned out easier as Arminia finished fourth. The club also lowered its debts through an alliance of sponsors and Fabian Klos replaced Ernst Kuster as the club's all-time top scorer. In November 2018, the club sold its stadium. In the 2018–19 season Arminia finished seventh in the league after their coach Jeff Saibene was replaced by Uwe Neuhaus, but lost 3–0 at home against MSV Duisburg in the second round of the DFB-Pokal.

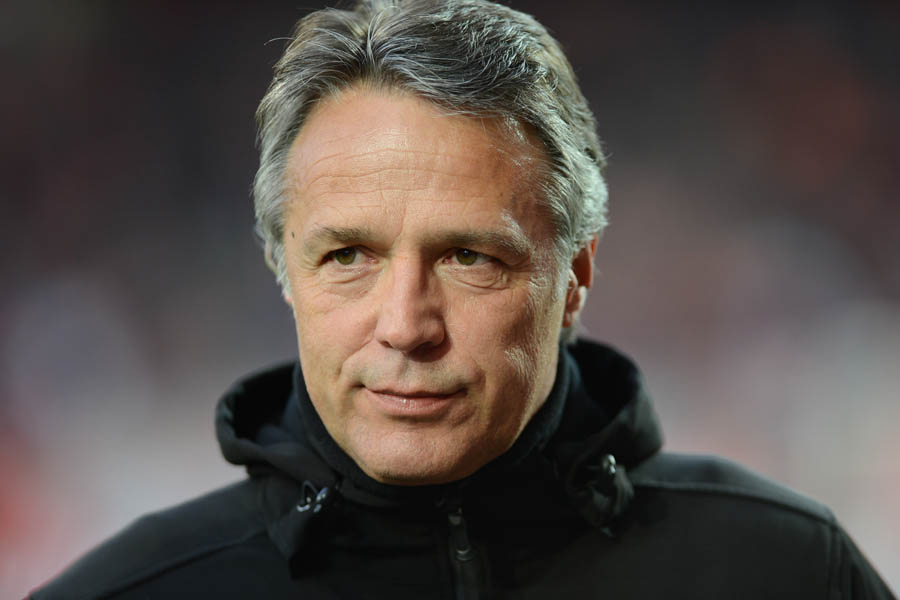
Uwe Neuhaus brought Arminia back into the Bundesliga.

The 2019–20 season saw an improvement, as the club won the 2. Bundesliga and equalled the record for most promotions to the Bundesliga with their eighth promotion, a record they hold jointly with 1. FC Nürnberg. An early-season 2–0 victory away against Hannover 96 moved them to third in the table, and they occupied the second promotion place when they met Schalke in the second round of the DFB-Pokal in October 2019. After Schalke led by three goals, Arminia scored twice in the last twenty minutes and almost forced extra time but eventually lost 3–2. They moved top of the league in December, ahead of other promotion candidates including Hamburger SV and VfB Stuttgart. After Arminia's 1–1 draw in Stuttgart on 9 March 2020, the season was interrupted because of the COVID-19 pandemic, but they finished as champions with 68 points, ten more than second-placed Stuttgart, having lost only two league matches all season.

=== Bundesliga return and double relegation (2020–present) ===
In the 2020–21 season, Arminia were the team with the lowest budget in the Bundesliga. In March 2021, their manager Uwe Neuhaus was replaced by Frank Kramer. A 2–0 win over VfB Stuttgart in the final match secured their spot in the 2021–22 Bundesliga, but they finished that season in 17th place and were relegated to the 2. Bundesliga. In the 2022–23 season, Arminia finished 16th and lost the relegation play-off to Wehen Wiesbaden, recording consecutive relegations. In their fourth season in the 3. Liga in 2023–24, the captain Fabian Klos announced his retirement from professional football to end his 13-year career with the club.

In 2025, the team reached the final of the DFB-Pokal for the first time after defeating the holders Bayer Leverkusen 2–1. They were the first third division club to reach the final since 2001, and the first such team to knock out four higher ranked Bundesliga teams in one season. Their American captain Mael Corboz in particular received international attention. In May 2025, Arminia secured the 3. Liga title by beating Waldhof Mannheim 1–0 in their final fixture, but the following week they lost the DFB-Pokal final 4–2 to Stuttgart.

== Colours and crest ==
Arminia took the club colours blue, white and black upon their foundation in 1905, but they played their first match in an orange kit. Arminia's home kit was blue for most of the time, while their shorts and socks were white. The team that played in the Bundesliga in the 1970s wore a blue shirt with thick white stripes. The away kit was mostly all white, while green shirts were worn in the 1990s. The club's current colours are black, white and blue.

The crest consists of a flag with the club's colours, black, white and blue. The white part of the flag includes the letter A for Arminia. The flag is surrounded by a laurel wreath.

=== Crest ===
1. FC Arminia Bielefeld
1905–1922

1922–1949

1975–2000

=== Crest variations ===
Crest inside Shield
1975–1985

=== Kit suppliers and shirt sponsors ===
Period	Kit manufacturer	Shirt sponsor (chest)	Shirt sponsor (sleeve)	Shirt sponsor (back)
Prior to 1975	None (In-House)	None	None	None
1975–1979	Adidas	granini	None	None
1979–1985	Adidas	Seidensticker	None	None
1985–1988	Adidas	granini	None	None
1988–1991	Adidas	Schüco	None	None
1991–1993	Lotto	Sportlepp	None	None
1993–1994	Lotto	Forum Jahnplatz/NaturoKork	None	None
1994–1996	Lotto	Westfalen Blatt	None	None
1996–1998	Reusch	Gerry Weber	None	None
1998–2000	Reusch	Herforder Pils	None	None
2000–2001	Uhlsport	Herforder Pils	None	None
2001–2002	Uhlsport	Real	None	None
2002–2004	Uhlsport	KiK	None	None
2004–2005	Uhlsport	Krombacher	None	None
2005–2010	Saller	Krombacher	None	None
2010–2011	Saller	Schüco	None	None
2011–2014	Saller	getgoods.de	None	None
2014–2017	Saller	Alpecin	JAB Anstoetz Group	None
2017–2020	Joma	Schüco	JAB Anstoetz Group	None
2020–2025	Macron	Schüco	JAB Anstoetz Group	None
2023–2024	Macron	Schüco	JAB Anstoetz Group	holz4home
since 2025	Umbro	Schüco	JAB Anstoetz Group	None

== Stadium ==
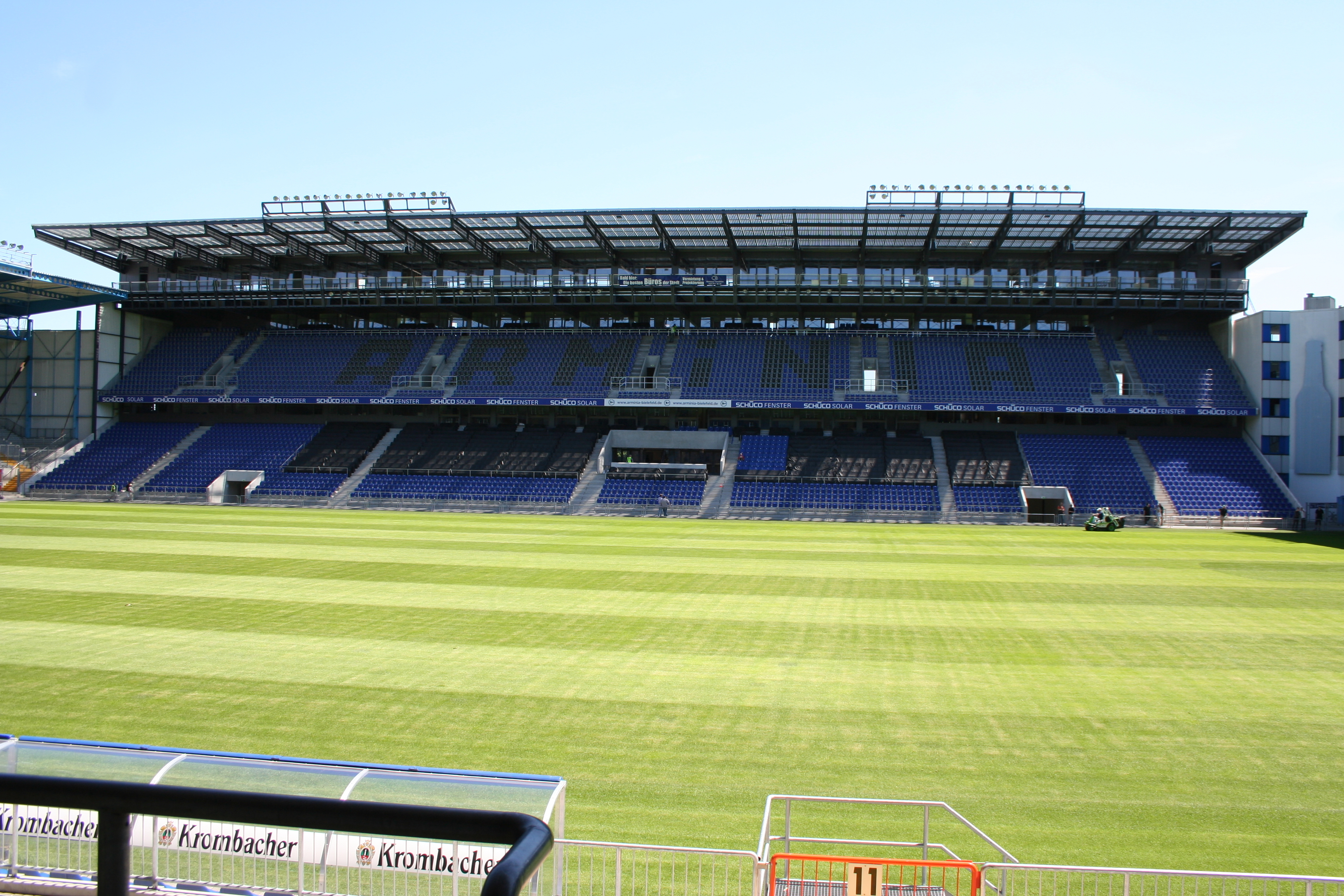
The new eastern stand

Arminia played their first home matches at the Kesselbrink in downtown Bielefeld. They moved to a new ground at the Kaiserstraße (today: August-Bebel-Straße) in 1907, and to the Pottenau in 1910. In 1926, Arminia leased a ground from a farmer named Lohmann. The ground did not look like a football pitch. The club member Heinrich Pahl said that the area looks like an Alm (German for alpine grassland), so the stadium was known as the Alm. Arminia played its first match against Victoria Hamburg on 1 May 1926. The first grandstands were constructed in 1954. When Arminia won promotion to the Bundesliga in 1970, the Alm underwent a general development. A main stand with seats was built and the northern and eastern stands were enlarged. The Alm had a capacity of 30,000 and floodlights were installed. In 1978, a roof was added to the main stands and the other stands were enlarged again. The stadium had a capacity of 35,000 then.

When Arminia was relegated to the Oberliga in 1988, the northern and the southern stand were torn down because both stands did not match the new safety regulations. The eastern stand was also made smaller and a roof was added. The capacity was reduced to about 15,000. After Arminia won promotion to the Bundesliga in 1996, the main and northern stands were demolished and completely rebuilt. The same happened to the south stand in 1999. In 2004, Arminia signed a sponsorship deal with Schüco and the stadium was named SchücoArena. The latest redevelopment saw the Eastern Stand rebuilt in 2008.

The stadium has a capacity of 27,332, including 7,940 terraced spaces and 19,392 seats. Bielefelder Alm was a candidate to host matches of the 2011 FIFA Women's World Cup.

== Supporters ==
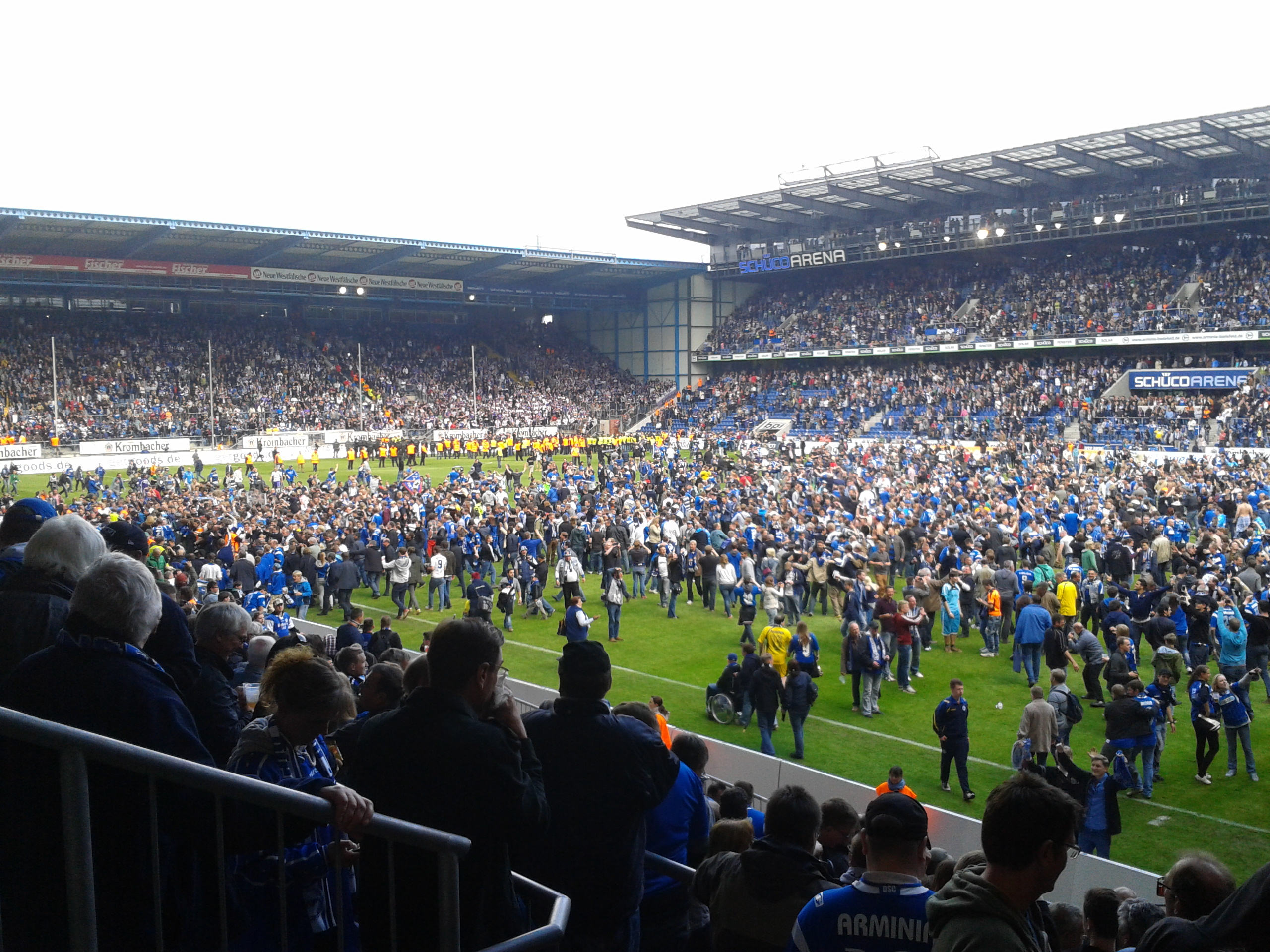
Pitch invasion after securing promotion at Bielefelder Alm in 2013

Arminia have a large number of loyal supporters. Even in 2011–12, Arminia had an average attendance of 8,930, which was the highest in the 3. Liga. In 2014–15, Arminia had an average attendance of 14,540, which was the second highest in that 3. Liga season. The numbers also show the risen popularity of the 3. Liga. Arminia's matches during the 2013–14 2. Bundesliga were attended by 16,890 on average. These numbers only count league matches. Arminia's matches in the 2014–15 DFB-Pokal were attended by 21,763 on average. The core of the fans can be found on the terraces of the Southern Stand.

Arminia's fans come primarily from the Ostwestfalen-Lippe region, itself comprising two distinct cultural regions (eastern Westphalia and Lippe), with a catchment area of about 100 kilometers around Bielefeld. There are around 140 fan clubs, mostly from Ostwestfalen-Lippe. However, there are fan clubs in Berlin, Stuttgart, London, Birmingham, Taunton, Austria and the Netherlands.

The team's games are regularly broadcast by local radio station Radio Bielefeld and commentator Ulrich Zwetz.

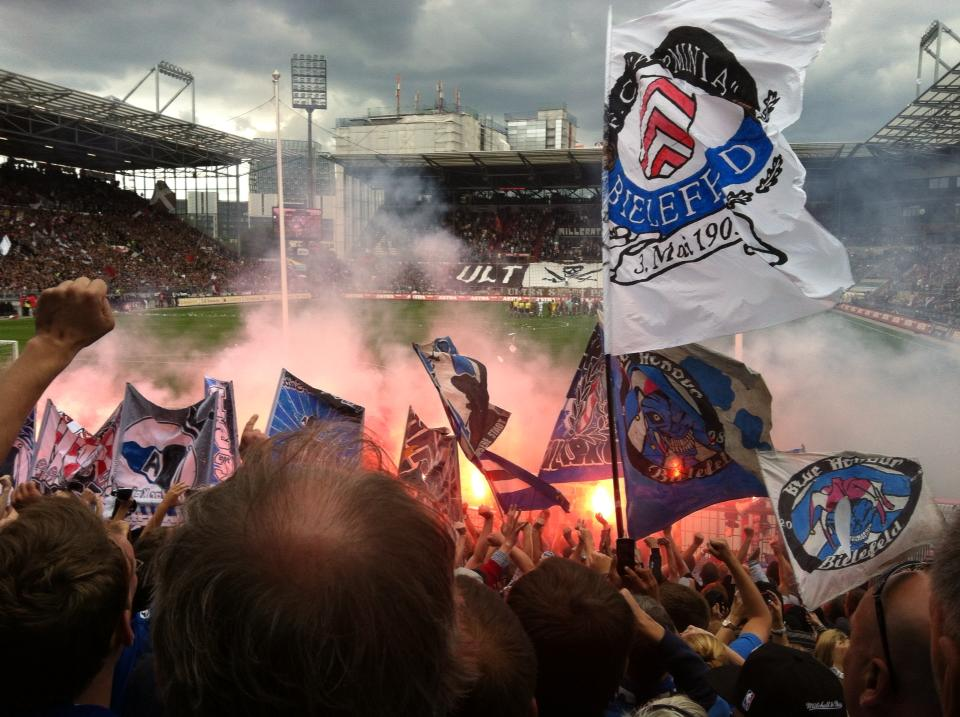
Arminia supporters backing their team during an away game at Millerntor-Stadion

=== Rivalries ===
There is a traditional rivalry with SC Preußen Münster. The match against them in March 2012, which was the first one taking place in Bielefeld after nearly 20 years, was attended by 21,203 spectators. No other match in the 3. Liga had such a high attendance. One year later, the stadium was nearly sold out in that derby. An earlier rival was VfB 03 Bielefeld from the east of Bielefeld, but the rivalry lessened, and, nowadays, friendly matches between Arminia and VfB Fichte Bielefeld, as the club nowadays is called, take place every year. Another rival is VfL Bochum, especially since the late 90s, and there were "fashion rivalries" with other clubs from the Ruhr, because that area also belongs to Westphalia. Many SC Paderborn 07 supporters consider Arminia as their main rival, but Arminia fans generally do not feel the same about them. Also the matches against VfL Osnabrück are a small derby (somehow oscillating between friendship and rivalry). There are friendly relations to the supporters of the Hamburger SV, with both clubs sharing the same colours (black, white and blue), resulting in the chant "Schwarz, weiß, blau – Arminia und der HSV" (Black, white, blue – Arminia and HSV) among supporters of both clubs. For many fans this friendship also involves friendly ties to Hannover 96, whose fans share a friendship with Hamburg as well. The three clubs are sometimes dubbed the "Nordallianz" (Northern Alliance), despite Bielefeld not being located in what is considered northern Germany.

== Players ==
=== Current squad ===
As of 2 September 2026

Note: Flags indicate national team as defined under FIFA eligibility rules; some limited exceptions apply. Players may hold more than one non-FIFA nationality.

No.	Pos.	Nation	Player
1	GK	GER	Jonas Kersken
2	DF	GER	Felix Hagmann
3	DF	DEN	Joel Felix
5	DF	GER	Maximilian Bauer (captain)
6	MF	GER	Marvin Mehlem
7	DF	TOG	Henri Koudossou
8	MF	GER	Sam Schreck
9	FW	NED	David Min (on loan from Utrecht)
10	MF	GER	Jannik Rochelt
11	FW	GER	Joel Grodowski
13	MF	GER	Lukas Kunze
14	FW	GER	Thaddäus-Monju Momuluh
17	DF	GER	Arne Sicker
18	GK	GER	Leo Oppermann

No.	Pos.	Nation	Player
19	DF	GER	Maximilian Großer
21	MF	GER	Stefano Russo
23	DF	GER	Leon Schneider
27	MF	GER	Benjamin Boakye
28	FW	LAT	Roberts Uldriķis
29	DF	GER	Tim Handwerker
30	FW	USA	Isaiah Young
31	MF	GER	Leon Jensen
38	MF	GER	Marius Wörl
42	MF	GER	Till Wegener
43	MF	GER	Daniel Richter
44	MF	TUR	Eyyüb Yasar
47	GK	GER	Philip Hildesheim
50	GK	GER	Mino Jäger

=== Former players ===
- (Australia) Hayden Foxe

== 100 year team ==
To celebrate the 100th anniversary of the club's formation, a fan poll was taken to determine the club's greatest starting XI, as well as seven substitutes and a manager. The following players were chosen:

Starting XI

- Uli Stein
- Günther Schäfer
- Dieter Schulz
- Thomas Stratos
- Walter Claus-Oehler
- Frank Pagelsdorf
- Thomas von Heesen
- Norbert Eilenfeldt
- Bernd Kirchner
- Bruno Labbadia
- Ewald Lienen

Substitutes

- Wolfgang Kneib
- Thomas Helmer
- Arne Friedrich
- Helmut Schröder
- Silvio Meißner
- Giuseppe Reina
- Fritz Walter

Manager

- Ernst Middendorp

== Arminia players in national teams ==
The player who has won the most international caps while at the club (from 1997 to 2000) is Karim Bagheri with 28 for Iran. He and his team-mate Ali Daei were important Iranian players in the 1998 FIFA World Cup. They are the only footballers having taken part in a World Cup's final tournament while playing for Arminia. Other remarkable Arminia players who represented foreign countries while at the club are Pasi Rautiainen, Artur Wichniarek, Markus Weissenberger, Fatmir Vata, Isaac Boakye, Delron Buckley, Sibusiso Zuma, Rowen Fernández, Christopher Katongo, Jonas Kamper, Ritsu Dōan and Alessandro Schöpf.

Four players were capped by Germany during their time with Arminia: Walter Claus-Oehler in 1923, Stefan Kuntz in 1996, Ronald Maul in 1999 and Patrick Owomoyela in 2004 and 2005. He played six matches for Germany in this time and thus holds the record. Some of the most famous former Arminia players played for their national teams only between their times with Arminia (Uli Stein and Jörg Böhme) or after their years with Arminia (Dieter Burdenski, Thomas Helmer, Arne Friedrich, Heiko Westermann and Jonathan Clauss).

== Honours ==
- Arminia Bielefeld has never won any major trophies, but they have won some silverware on a minor level.

=== League titles ===
- 2. Bundesliga: (II)
  - Champions: 1977–78, 1979–80, 1998–99, 2019–20
- 3. Liga: (III)
  - Champions: 2014–15, 2024–25
- Regionalliga West/Südwest: (III)
  - Champions: 1994–95
- Oberliga Westfalen: (III)
  - Champions: 1989–90

=== Regional titles ===
- Western German football championship
  - Winners: 1922, 1923

=== Cups ===
- West German Cup
  - Winners: 1966, 1974
- Westphalian Cup
  - Winners: 1908, 1932, 1991, 2012, 2013, 2024, 2025
- DFB-Pokal
  - Runners-up: 2024–25

== Management and staff ==
=== Current staff ===
As of 19 March 2024

Coaching staff
(Germany) Mitch Kniat	Head coach
(Spain) Daniel Jara	Assistant coach
(Germany) Janik Steringer	Assistant coach
(Germany) Luis Allmeroth	Assistant coach and video analyst
(Germany) Steffen Süßner	Goalkeeper coach
(Germany) Niklas Klasen	Fitness coach
(Germany) Malte Hornemann	Rehabilitation coach
Functional team
(Germany) Prof. Dr. Stefan Budde	Team doctor
(Germany) PD Dr. Tim Niedergassel	Team doctor
(Germany) Dr. Andreas Elsner	Team doctor
(Germany) Michael Schweika	MSc. ost physiotherapist & osteopath
(Germany) Arne Böker	Physiotherapist
(Germany) Rainer Schonz	Equipment manager & supervisor
(Germany) Sebastian Wolf	Equipment manager & supervisor
Team management
(Germany) Katrin Meyer	Team manager

=== Managers since 1922 ===
Coach	Nationality	from	to	Significant events
František Zoubek	Czechoslovakia	1922	1923	West German Champion 1923
Gerd Wellhöfer	Germany	1923	1924	Westfalen Champion 1924
František Zoubek; Gerd Wellhöfer	Czechoslovakia Germany	1924	1925	Westfalen Champion 1925
Gerd Wellhöfer	Germany	1925	1926	Westfalen Champion 1926
František Zoubek	Czechoslovakia	1926	1933	Westfalen Champion 1923, 1933; Westfälischer Cup Winner 1932; Qualification to the Gauliga Westfalen 1933
Otto Faist	Germany	1933	1935	Relegation from Gauliga 1934
Karl Willnecker	Germany	1935	1938	Promotion to Gauliga 1938
Erich Brochmeyer	Germany	1938	1939	
Ferdinand Swatosch	Austria	1939	1940	Vice Champion of the Gauliga
Otto Kranefeld	Germany	1940	1942	
Karl Wunderlich	Germany	1942	1945	
Erich Brochmeyer	Germany	1945	1946	Relegation to the Landesliga
Ferdinand Swatosch	Austria	1946	1947	
Karl Wunderlich	Germany	1947	1948	Promotion to the Landesliga
Alois Münstermann	Germany	1948	1949	Promotion to the Oberliga
Friedrich Otto	Germany	1949	1950	Relegation to the 2. Liga West
Fritz Kaiser	Germany	1950	1951	
Hellmut Meidt	Germany	1951	1953	
Donndorf	Germany	1953	1955	Relegation to the Landesliga 1954
Otto Westphal	Germany	1955	1958	
Arthur Gruber	Germany	1958	19 March 1961	first Coach sacking
Josef Rasselnberg	Germany	20 March 1961	1961	
Jakob Wimmer	Germany	1961	April 1963	Promotion to the 2. Liga West 1962
Hellmut Meidt	Germany	April 1963	1965	Qualification to the Regionalliga 1963
Robert Gebhardt	Germany	1965	1966	Westdeutscher Cup Winner; Westfälischer Cup Winner
Hans Wendlandt	Germany	1966	November 1969	
Egon Piechaczek	Poland	November 1969	December 1971	Promotion to the Bundesliga 1970
Hellmut Meidt	Germany	January 1972	January 1972	
Jan Notermans	Netherlands	February 1972	October 1972	Relegation to the Regionalliga
Willi Nolting	Germany	October 1972	February 1973	
Norbert Lessle	Germany	February 1973	September 1973	
Karl-Heinz "Harry" Garstecki	Germany	September 1973	October 1973	
Willi Nolting	Germany	October 1973	Januar 1974	
Rudi Faßnacht	Germany	January 1974	1974	Qualification to the 2. Bundesliga; Westfälischer Cup Winner
Erhard Ahmann	Germany	1974	1976	
Karl-Heinz Feldkamp	Germany	1976	1978	Promotion to the Bundesliga
Milovan Beljin	Yugoslavia	1978	October 1978	
Otto Rehhagel	Germany	October 1978	October 1979	Relegation to the 2. Bundesliga 1978
Willi Nolting	Germany	October 1979	October 1979	
Hans-Dieter Tippenhauer	Germany	October 1979	September 1980	Promotion to the Bundesliga
Willi Nolting	Germany	September 1980	December 1980	
Horst Franz	Germany	December 1980	1982	
Horst Köppel	Germany	1982	1983	8th in the Bundesliga
Karl-Heinz Feldkamp	Germany	1983	March 1984	
Gerd Roggensack	Germany	March 1984	February 1986	8th in the Bundesliga 1984; Relegation to the 2. Bundesliga 1985
Horst Franz	Germany	February 1986	November 1986	
Fritz Fuchs	Germany	November 1986	December 1987	
Joachim Krug	Germany	December 1987	April 1988	
Ernst Middendorp	Germany	April 1988	October 1990	Relegation to the Oberliga 1988; Champion of the Oberliga Westfalen 1990
Franz Raschid	Germany	October 1990	1991	
Fritz Grösche	Germany	1991	1992	
Ingo Peter	Germany	1 July 1992	1 February 1994	
Theo Schneider	Germany	2 February 1994	30 June 1994	Qualification for the Regionalliga West/Südwest
Wolfgang Sidka	Germany	1994	September 1994	
Ernst Middendorp	Germany	September 1994	16 August 1998	Promotion to the 2. Bundesliga (1995); Promotion to the Bundesliga (1996); Relegation to the 2. Bundesliga
Thomas von Heesen	Germany	17 August 1998	1999	Promotion to the Bundesliga
Hermann Gerland	Germany	1999	October 2000	Relegation to the 2. Bundesliga
Benno Möhlmann	Germany	October 2000	16 February 2004	Promotion to the Bundesliga; Relegation to the 2. Bundesliga
Thomas von Heesen	Germany	17 February 2004	29 February 2004	
Uwe Rapolder	Germany	1 March 2004	10 May 2005	Promotion to the Bundesliga
Frank Geideck	Germany	11 May 2005	2005	
Thomas von Heesen	Germany	2005	11 February 2007	
Frank Geideck	Germany	11 February 2007	13 March 2007	
Ernst Middendorp	Germany	14 March 2007	9 December 2007	
Detlev Dammeier	Germany	10 December 2007	31 December 2007	
Michael Frontzeck	Germany	1 January 2008	17 May 2009	
Jörg Berger	Germany	19 May 2009	24 June 2009	Relegation to the 2. Bundesliga
Thomas Gerstner	Germany	24 June 2009	11 March 2010	
Frank Eulberg & Jörg Böhme	Germany	11 March 2010	26 May 2010	
Christian Ziege	Germany	26 May 2010	6 November 2010	
Ewald Lienen	Germany	7 November 2010	30 June 2011	Relegation to the 3. Liga
Markus von Ahlen	Germany	1 July 2011	20 September 2011	
Stefan Krämer	Germany	21 September 2011	23 February 2014	Promotion to the 2. Bundesliga
Norbert Meier	Germany	24 February 2014	10 June 2016	Promotion to the 2. Bundesliga; Semi-final of the DFB-Pokal (2014–15)
Rüdiger Rehm	Germany	15 June 2016	22 October 2016	
Carsten Rump	Germany	23 October 2016	15 November 2016	
Jürgen Kramny	Germany	15 November 2016	14 March 2017	
Jeff Saibene	Luxembourg	19 March 2017	10 December 2018	
Uwe Neuhaus	Germany	10 December 2018	1 March 2021	Promotion to the Bundesliga
Frank Kramer	Luxembourg	2 March 2021	20 April 2022	
Marco Kostmann	Germany	20 April 2022	3 June 2022	
Uli Forte	Italy	3 June 2022	17 August 2022	
Daniel Scherning	Germany	18 August 2022	7 March 2023	
Uwe Koschinat	Germany	9 March 2023	30 June 2023	Relegation to the 3. Liga
Mitch Kniat	Germany	1 July 2023		Promotion to the 2. Bundesliga; Final of the DFB-Pokal (2024–25)
