= 1937 Tschammerpokal final =

- Event: 1937 Tschammerpokal
Schalke 04	Fortuna Düsseldorf
2	1
- Date: 9 January 1938
- Venue: Müngersdorfer Stadion, Cologne
- Referee: Hans Grabler (Regensburg)
- Attendance: 72,000

The 1937 Tschammerpokal final decided the winner of the 1937 Tschammerpokal, the 3rd season of Germany's knockout football cup competition. It was played on 9 January 1938 at the Müngersdorfer Stadion in Cologne. Schalke 04 won the match 2–1 against Fortuna Düsseldorf, to claim their 1st cup title.

With their win, Schalke completed the first double in the history of German football, having previously won the 1937 German football championship with a 2–0 win over 1. FC Nürnberg in the final.

== Route to the final ==
The Tschammerpokal began the final stage with 61 teams in a single-elimination knockout cup competition. There were a total of five rounds leading up to the final. Teams were drawn against each other, and the winner after 90 minutes would advance. If still tied, 30 minutes of extra time was played. If the score was still level, a replay would take place at the original away team's stadium. If still level after 90 minutes, 30 minutes of extra time was played. If the score was still level, a second replay would take place at the original home team's stadium. If still level after 90 minutes, 30 minutes of extra time was played. If the score was still level, a drawing of lots would decide who would advance to the next round.

Note: In all results below, the score of the finalist is given first (H: home; A: away).

Schalke 04		Round	Fortuna Düsseldorf
Opponent	Result	1937 Tschammerpokal	Opponent	Result
Kickers Frankenthal (A)	3–1	Round 1	Bye
Rot-Weiß Oberhausen (H)	2–1	Round 2	Karlsruher FV (A)	2–0
Eintracht Braunschweig (A)	1–0 (a.e.t.)	Round of 16	Holstein Kiel (H)	2–1
Berliner SV (H)	3–1	Quarter-finals	BC Hartha (H)	4–1
Waldhof Mannheim (H)	2–1	Semi-finals	Dresdner SC (H)	5–2

== Match ==
=== Details ===
9 January 1938

Schalke 04	2–1	Fortuna Düsseldorf
Kalwitzki 46'; Szepan 47'	Report	Janes 84' (pen.)

Müngersdorfer Stadion, Cologne
Attendance: 72,000
Referee: Hans Grabler (Regensburg)

Schalke 04	Fortuna Düsseldorf

GK	1	(Germany) Hans Klodt
RB		(Germany) Ernst Sontow
LB		(Germany) Hans Bornemann
RH		(Germany) Rudolf Gellesch
CH		(Germany) Otto Tibulski
LH		(Germany) Walter Berg
OR		(Germany) Ernst Kalwitzki
IR		(Germany) Fritz Szepan
CF		(Germany) Ernst Poertgen
IL		(Germany) Ernst Kuzorra (c)
OL		(Germany) Adolf Urban
Manager:
(Germany) Hans Schmidt

GK	1	(Germany) Willi Pesch (c)
RB		(Germany) Paul Janes
LB		(Germany) Bernhard Kluth
RH		(Germany) Paul Mehl
CH		(Germany) Jakob Bender
LH		(Germany) Edmund Czaika
OR		(Germany) Ernst Albrecht
IR		(Germany) Willi Wigold
CF		(Germany) Hans Heibach
IL		(Germany) Felix Zwolanowski
OL		(Germany) Stanislaus Kobierski
Manager:
(Germany) Karl Flink

Match rules

- 90 minutes.
- 30 minutes of extra time if necessary.
- Replay if scores still level.
- No substitutions.
