= 1932–33 Eintracht Frankfurt season =

Eintracht Frankfurt
1932–33 season
- Chairman: Egon Graf von Beroldingen
- Manager: Paul Oßwald
- Bezirksliga Main-Hessen (Main division): 2nd / Runners-Up
- South German Championship round: 2nd / Runners-Up
- German Championship knockout stage: Semi-finals
- Domestic cup competition: Not established yet
- Top goalscorer: League: August Möbs (10); All: Karl Ehmer (26)
- Highest home attendance: 17,000 27 November 1932 v FSV Frankfurt (league)
- Lowest home attendance: 1,000 25 September 1932 v Hanauer FC 93 (league)
- Average home league attendance: 4,611

The 1932–33 Eintracht Frankfurt season was the 33rd season in the club's football history.

In 1932–33 the club played in the Bezirksliga Main-Hessen (Main division), the top tier of German football. It was the club's 7th season in the Bezirksliga Main-Hessen (Main division).

The season ended up with Eintracht finishing as runners-up in the Bezirksliga Main-Hessen (Main division). In the South German Championship round finished as runners-up. In the semi-finals of the German Championship knockout stage lost to Fortuna Düsseldorf.

== Matches ==
=== Legend ===
Win Draw Loss Postponed

=== Friendlies ===
7 August 1932	Hertha BSC (Germany)	2–4	(Germany) Eintracht Frankfurt	Berlin, Germany
	Krisei 30'; Sobek	Report	Ehmer 8'; Möbs 25'; Schaller	Stadium: Stadion am Gesundbrunnen; Attendance: 14,000

5 August 1932	Schalke 04 (Germany)	2–0	(Germany) Eintracht Frankfurt	Germany
	Szepan; Schütz o.g.'	Report		Attendance: 15,000

20 November 1932	Preußen Münster (Germany)	0–2	(Germany) Eintracht Frankfurt	Münster, Germany
		Report	Ehmer 30'; Leis 50'	Attendance: 4,000

12 March 1933	Borussia Fulda (Germany)	4–3	(Germany) Eintracht Frankfurt	Fulda, Germany
	Leugers 8', 17'; Meisel 19'; Kamerl 66'	Report	Ehmer 59'; Mantel	Attendance: 3,000; Referee: Lohren

14 May 1933	Eintracht Bad Kreuznach (Germany)	0–9	(Germany) Eintracht Frankfurt	Bad Kreuznach, Germany
		Report	Lindner 2'; Ehmer; Mantel; Möbs; Tiefel

3 June 1933	Eintracht Frankfurt / FSV Frankfurt (Germany)	7–3	(Hungary) Újpest	Frankfurt, Germany
	Möbs; Knapp; Lindner	Report	Goal	Stadium: Waldstadion; Attendance: 7,000

11 June 1933	TSV 1860 München (Germany)	3–1	(Germany) Eintracht Frankfurt	Germany
	Kronzucker; Kiener	Report	Leis	Attendance: 7,000; Referee: Walterberger

17 June 1933	Mainz 05 (Germany)	1–3	(Germany) Eintracht Frankfurt	Mainz, Germany
	Scherm 76'	Report	Möbs 61'; Leis 68'; Hemmerich 82'	Attendance: 1,000; Referee: Becker

25 June 1933	Eintracht Frankfurt / FSV Frankfurt (Germany)	2–4	Germany B	Frankfurt, Germany
	Möbs 35'; Heldmann	Report	Hohmann; Hausmann; Heidemann	Stadium: Waldstadion; Attendance: 35,000; Referee: Weingärtner

30 June 1933	Eintracht Frankfurt (Germany)	3–3	(Germany) FSV Frankfurt	Frankfurt, Germany
	Möbs; Leis	Report	Knapp; Schweinhardt	Stadium: Riederwaldstadion; Attendance: 2,500; Referee: Müller

=== Bezirksliga Main-Hessen (Main division) ===
==== League fixtures and results ====
31 July 1932 1	VfL Neu-Isenburg	0–2	Eintracht Frankfurt	Neu-Isenburg, Germany
		Report	Trumpler; Ehmer	Attendance: 3,000; Referee: List

14 August 1932 2	Eintracht Frankfurt	9–1	VfB Friedberg	Frankfurt, Germany
	Schaller 21' 85'; Stubb 23', 70'; Trumpler; Möbs 62'; Ehmer pen.'	Report	Baumann 3'	Stadium: Riederwaldstadion; Attendance: 1,500; Referee: Hack

21 August 1932 3	Rot-Weiss Frankfurt	2–2	Eintracht Frankfurt	Frankfurt, Germany
	Rockenfeller; Dietzel	Report	Ehmer; Sand o.g.'	Stadium: Waldstadion; Attendance: 2,000

28 August 1932 4	Eintracht Frankfurt	3–0	Union Niederrad	Frankfurt, Germany
	Möbs 37'; Ehmer; Kolter o.g.'	Report		Attendance: 5,000; Referee: Speidel

4 September 1932 5	Germania Bieber	1–1	Eintracht Frankfurt	Bieber, Germany
	Stahlheber	Report	Ehmer	Attendance: 2,500; Referee: Schneid

11 September 1932 6	Eintracht Frankfurt	3–0	Frankfurter FV Sportfreunde 04	Germany
	Möbs; Hemmerich	Report		Attendance: 2,500; Referee: Kaiser

18 September 1932 7	FSV Frankfurt	3–1	Eintracht Frankfurt	Frankfurt, Germany
	Goal	Report	Schaller	Stadium: Waldstadion; Attendance: 25,000; Referee: Heß

25 September 1932 8	Eintracht Frankfurt	1–0	Hanauer FC 93	Germany
	Ehmer 16'	Report		Attendance: 1,000; Referee: Unverfehrt

2 October 1932 9	Kickers Offenbach	2–4	Eintracht Frankfurt	Bieber, Germany
	Grebe pen.'; Eckardt	Report	Schaller 5'; Gramlich 70'	Stadium: Stadion am Bieberer Berg; Attendance: 10,000; Referee: Kreichauf

9 October 1932 10	Eintracht Frankfurt	2–0	VfL Neu-Isenburg	Frankfurt, Germany
	Ehmer; Hemmerich	Report		Stadium: Riederwaldstadion; Attendance: 2,000; Referee: Maul

16 October 1932 11	VfB Friedberg	1–1	Eintracht Frankfurt	Friedberg, Germany
	Schmidt 80'	Report	Monz; Kron (red card)	Stadium: Burgfeld; Attendance: 3,000; Referee: Kratzenberg

23 October 1932 12	Eintracht Frankfurt	5–1	Rot-Weiss Frankfurt	Germany
	Leis; Möbs; Mantel pen.'; H Berger	Report	Scheuermann 89'	Attendance: 6,000; Referee: Krotz

30 October 1932 13	Union Niederrad	1–1	Eintracht Frankfurt	Frankfurt, Germany
	Gebhard	Report	Möbs	Attendance: 4,000; Referee: Selzam

6 November 1932 14	Eintracht Frankfurt	1–0	Germania Bieber	Germany
	Möbs	Report	Korf (red card)	Attendance: 4,000; Referee: Glöckner

13 November 1932 15	Frankfurter FV Sportfreunde 04	0–2	Eintracht Frankfurt	Frankfurt, Germany
		Report	Möbs 20'; Ehmer 47'	Stadium: Sportplatz Mainzer Landstraße; Attendance: 2,000; Referee: Schehl

27 November 1932 16	Eintracht Frankfurt	3–1	FSV Frankfurt	Frankfurt, Germany
	Möbs; Behning	Report	Schlagbauer	Stadium: Waldstadion; Attendance: 17,000; Referee: Kläger

11 December 1932 17	Eintracht Frankfurt	2–2	Kickers Offenbach	Frankfurt, Germany
	E Berger 43', 62'	Report	Stein 15'; Meid 48' (pen.)	Stadium: Waldstadion; Attendance: 2,500; Referee: Multer

18 December 1932 18	Hanauer FC 93	1–2	Eintracht Frankfurt	Germany
	Goal	Report	Möbs; Behning	Attendance: 1,200

==== League table ====
Pos	Team	Pld	W	D	L	GF	GA	GD	Pts	Promotion, qualification or relegation
1	FSV Frankfurt	18	15	1	2	49	16	+33	31	Qualification to Qualifier to the championship
2	Eintracht Frankfurt	18	12	5	1	45	16	+29	29	Qualification to Qualifier to the championship
3	Kickers Offenbach	18	11	4	3	52	24	+28	26	
4	Union Niederrad	18	9	2	7	39	37	+2	20	
5	VfL Neu-Isenburg	18	7	3	8	36	33	+3	17	
6	Germania Bieber	18	6	3	9	29	32	−3	15	
7	Rot-Weiss Frankfurt	18	6	2	10	42	44	−2	14	
8	Frankfurter FV Sportfreunde 04	18	6	1	11	28	52	−24	13	
9	Hanauer FC 93	18	2	4	12	19	40	−21	8	Relegation to the second tier
10	VfB Friedberg	18	2	3	13	21	66	−45	7	Relegation to the second tier

Source: RSSSF.com
Rules for classification: 1) Points

==== Results summary ====
Overall								Home						Away					
Pld	W	D	L	GF	GA	GD	Pts	W	D	L	GF	GA	GD	W	D	L	GF	GA	GD
18	12	5	1	45	16	+29	29	8	1	0	29	5	+24	4	4	1	16	11	+5

Source: Bundesliga

==== Results by round ====
Round	1	2	3	4	5	6	7	8	9	10	11	12	13	14	15	16	17	18
Ground	A	H	A	H	A	H	A	H	A	H	A	H	A	H	A	H	H	A
Result	W	W	D	W	D	W	L	W	W	W	D	W	D	W	W	W	D	W
Position	1	1	2	1	2	1	3	3	2	2	2	2	3	3	2	2	2	2

A = Away; H = Home; W = Win; D = Draw; L = Loss

=== South German championship round ===
==== League fixtures and results ====
26 December 1932 1	Union Böckingen	2–0	Eintracht Frankfurt	Böckingen, Germany
	Hofmann 13'; Schadt 30'	Report		Stadium: Stadion am See; Attendance: 4,000; Referee: Kriechauf

8 January 1933 2	Eintracht Frankfurt	2–1	Mainz 05	Frankfurt, Germany
	Behning 53'; Trumpler 63'	Report	Scherm 38'	Stadium: Riederwaldstadion; Attendance: 3,000; Referee: Freiländer

15 January 1933 3	Stuttgarter Kickers	3–2	Eintracht Frankfurt	Stuttgart, Germany
	Cozza 47', 49'; Strauß 87'	Report	Behning	Stadium: Kickers-Platz; Attendance: 9,000; Referee: Port

22 January 1933 4	Eintracht Frankfurt	1–1	Karlsruher FV	Frankfurt, Germany
	Ehmer	Report	Schneider	Stadium: Riederwaldstadion; Attendance: 4,000; Referee: Maul

29 January 1933 5	Eintracht Frankfurt	4–2	Wormatia Worms	Frankfurt, Germany
	Behning; Trumpler; Lindner	Report	Winkler	Stadium: Waldstadion; Attendance: 1,000; Referee: Panzer

12 February 1933 6	FSV Frankfurt	1–3	Eintracht Frankfurt	Frankfurt, Germany
	Hensel	Report	Lindner 20', 75', 78'	Stadium: Waldstadion; Attendance: 18,000; Referee: Gröschel

19 February 1933 7	Eintracht Frankfurt	1–0	Phönix Karlsruhe	Frankfurt, Germany
	Lindner 3'	Report		Stadium: Riederwaldstadion; Attendance: 4,000; Referee: Hack

26 February 1933 8	Eintracht Frankfurt	5–0	Union Böckingen	Frankfurt, Germany
	Trumpler 9', 43'; Lindner 26', 42' (pen.); Hemmerich 60'	Report		Stadium: Riederwaldstadion; Attendance: 5,000; Referee: Reichel

5 March 1933 9	Mainz 05	1–2	Eintracht Frankfurt	Germany
	Burkhardt 87'	Report	Ehmer 30'; Lindner 60'	Attendance: 5,500; Referee: Bauer

19 March 1933 10	Eintracht Frankfurt	4–0	Stuttgarter Kickers	Frankfurt, Germany
	Ehmer	Report		Attendance: 4,000; Referee: Walter

26 March 1933 11	Karlsruher FV	2–3	Eintracht Frankfurt	Karlsruhe, Germany
	Müller 12'; Gaßmann	Report	Behning 10'; Dietrich; Lindner	Stadium: KFV-Platz; Attendance: 4,500; Referee: Freiländer

2 April 1933 12	Wormatia Worms	3–1	Eintracht Frankfurt	Worms, Germany
	Gölz 2'; Bitter 28', 41'	Report	Ehmer	Stadium: Wormatia-Stadion; Attendance: 6,000; Referee: Glöckner

9 April 1933 13	Eintracht Frankfurt	0–0	FSV Frankfurt	Frankfurt, Germany
		Report		Stadium: Waldstadion; Attendance: 20,000; Referee: Sackenreuter

16 April 1933 14	Phönix Karlsruhe	1–3	Eintracht Frankfurt	Karlsruhe, Germany
	Fürst	Report	Möbs 23'; Ehmer 65'	Stadium: FC-Phönix-Sportplatz; Attendance: 3,000; Referee: Scheel

==== League table ====
Pos	Team	Pld	W	D	L	GF	GA	GD	Pts	Promotion, qualification or relegation
1	FSV Frankfurt	14	10	1	3	33	17	+16	21	Qualification to Qualifier to the championship
2	Eintracht Frankfurt	14	9	2	3	31	17	+14	20	Qualification to Qualifier to the championship
3	Wormatia Worms	14	8	1	5	36	37	−1	17	
4	Stuttgarter Kickers	14	6	3	5	35	27	+8	15	
5	Karlsruher FV	14	6	1	7	24	29	−5	13	
6	Phönix Karlsruhe	14	6	0	8	28	29	−1	12	
7	Mainz 05	14	3	2	9	35	38	−3	8	
8	Union Böckingen	14	2	2	10	24	52	−28	6	

Source: RSSSF.com
Rules for classification: 1) Points

==== Results summary ====
Overall								Home						Away					
Pld	W	D	L	GF	GA	GD	Pts	W	D	L	GF	GA	GD	W	D	L	GF	GA	GD
14	9	2	3	31	17	+14	20	5	2	0	17	4	+13	4	0	3	14	13	+1

Source: Bundesliga

==== Results by round ====
Round	1	2	3	4	5	6	7	8	9	10	11	12	13	14
Ground	A	H	A	H	H	A	H	H	A	H	A	A	H	A
Result	L	W	L	D	W	W	W	W	W	W	W	L	D	W
Position	7	5	5	5	4	2	2	1	1	1	1	2	2	2

A = Away; H = Home; W = Win; D = Draw; L = Loss

=== Qualification for the German Championship knockout stage ===
23 April 1933	Eintracht Frankfurt	2–0	VfB Stuttgart	Frankfurt, Germany
	Ehmer; Lindner	Report		Stadium: Waldstadion; Attendance: 7,000; Referee: Walter

30 April 1933	Eintracht Frankfurt	1–0	SpVgg Fürth	Saarbrücken, Germany
	Trumpler 78'	Report		Stadium: Kieselhumes; Attendance: 15,000; Referee: Heß

=== German Championship knockout stage ===
7 May 1933 Round of 16	Hamburger SV	1–4	Eintracht Frankfurt	Hamburg, Germany
	Sveistrup 55'	Report	Ehmer 1'; Lindner 30'; Möbs	Stadium: Stadion Hoheluft; Attendance: 15,000; Referee: Dondelinger

21 May 1933 Quarter-final	Eintracht Frankfurt	12–2	Hindenburg Allenstein	Frankfurt, Germany
	Lindner 4'; Trumpler 6', 33'; Möbs 8', 25', 79'; Ehmer 28', 35', 56', 61', 62'; Tiefel 78'	Report	Ewald 77'; Kopitzki	Stadium: Waldstadion; Attendance: 12,000; Referee: Wingenfeld

28 May 1933 Semi-final	Fortuna Düsseldorf	4–0	Eintracht Frankfurt	Berlin, Germany
	Wigold 38'; Mehl 60', 87'; Hochgesang 79'	Report		Stadium: Platz des BFC Preussen; Attendance: 30,000; Referee: Röhrbein

== Squad ==
=== Squad and statistics ===
No.	Pos	Nat	Player	Total		Bezirksliga		South German Championship round		All German championship round	
No.	Pos	Nat	Player	Apps	Goals	Apps	Goals	Apps	Goals	Apps	Goals
	GK	(Germany) GER	Ludwig Schmitt	37	0	18	0	16	0	3	0
	DF		Bölp	1	0	1	0	0	0	0	0
	DF	(Germany) GER	Bruno Goldammer	1	0	1	0	0	0	0	0
	DF	(Germany) GER	Franz Schütz	30	0	11	0	16	0	3	0
	DF	(Germany) GER	Hans Stubb	26	3	13	3	12	0	1	0
	MF	(Switzerland) SUI	Walter Dietrich	30	1	16	0	11	1	3	0
	MF	(Germany) GER	Rudolf Gramlich	32	1	15	1	15	0	2	0
	MF	(Germany) GER	Joseph Kron	15	0	11	0	4	0	0	0
	MF	(Germany) GER	Bernhard Leis	37	2	18	2	16	0	3	0
	MF	(Germany) GER	Hugo Mantel	32	1	16	1	13	0	3	0
	MF	(Germany) GER	Willi Tiefel	11	1	3	0	6	0	2	1
	FW	(Germany) GER	Behning	13	6	3	2	10	4	0	0
	FW	(Germany) GER	Ernst Berger	8	2	3	2	5	0	0	0
	FW	(Germany) GER	Heinz Berger	8	1	6	1	2	0	0	0
	FW	(Germany) GER	Karl Ehmer	26	26	12	9	11	11	3	6
	FW	(Germany) GER	Stefan Hemmerich	9	4	6	3	2	1	1	0
	FW	(Germany) GER	Willi Lindner	20	14	2	0	15	11	3	3
	FW		Mayer	1	0	1	0	0	0	0	0
	FW	(Germany) GER	August Möbs	25	15	16	10	6	1	3	4
	FW	(Germany) GER	Karl Monz	7	1	4	1	3	0	0	0
	FW	(Germany) GER	Fritz Schaller	9	6	9	6	0	0	0	0
	FW	(Germany) GER	Franz Sobanski	1	0	1	0	0	0	0	0
	FW	(Germany) GER	Theodor Trumpler	28	9	12	2	13	5	3	2

=== Transfers ===
In:

No.	Pos.	Nation	Player
—	MF	(Germany) GER	Behning (from Preußen Münster)
—	FW	(Germany) GER	Ernst Berger (from Eintracht Frankfurt academy)
—	DF		Bölp (from unknown)
—	FW	(Germany) GER	Stefan Hemmerich (from unknown)
—	FW	(Germany) GER	Willi Lindner (from Tennis Borussia Berlin)
—	FW		Mayer (from unknown)
—	FW	(Germany) GER	Karl Monz (from Eintracht Frankfurt academy)
—	MF	(Germany) GER	Willi Tiefel (from Union Niederrad)

Out:

No.	Pos.	Nation	Player
—	FW		Kampschmieder (to unknown)
—	FW	(Germany) GER	Bernhard Kellerhoff (retired)
—	DF	(Germany) GER	Willi Pfeiffer (as player-manager to Union Niederrad)
—	GK		Pfister (to unknown)

== See also ==
- 1933 German football championship

== Sources ==
- Matheja, Ulrich (2011). Unsere Eintracht - Eintracht Frankfurt - Die Chronik. Die Werkstatt. ISBN 978-3-89533-750-5.
