= 1933 German football championship =

1933 German championship
Deutsche Fußballmeisterschaft
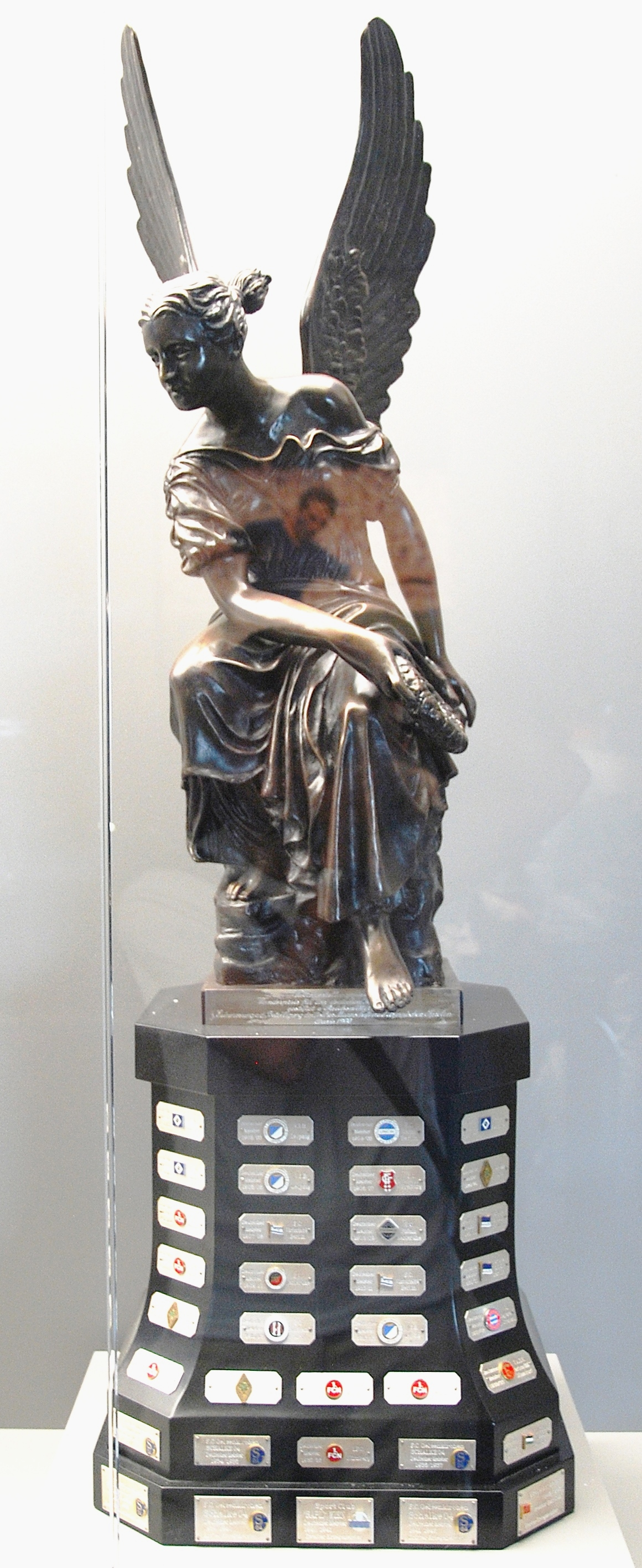
- Replica of the Viktoria trophy

Tournament details
- Country: Germany
- Dates: 7 May – 11 June
- Teams: 16

Final positions
- Champions: Fortuna Düsseldorf; 1st German title
- Runners-up: Schalke 04

Tournament statistics
- Matches played: 15
- Goals scored: 76 (5.07 per match)
- Top goal scorer: Karl Ehmer (6 goals)

The 1933 German football championship, the 26th edition of the competition, ended with the first national title for Fortuna Düsseldorf. The title was won with a 3–0 win over Schalke 04. It was a replay of the Western German championship final, in which Schalke had defeated Fortuna 1–0 on 30 April 1933.

For both clubs it was their first appearance in the German final. While Fortuna only played one more after this, in 1936, for Schalke it was the first in its golden era, playing in every final until 1942, except the 1936 one. Fortuna became the first Champion from the industrial western part of Germany.

The 1933 final was played after the rise of the Nazis to power in Germany. After this season, the German league system was overhauled and instead of the regional championships as qualifying competitions, the 16 Gauligas were introduced.

To qualify for the national championship, a team needed to win or finish runners-up in one of the seven regional championships. On top of those 14 clubs, the two strongest regions, West and South were allowed to send a third team each. In the West, this was the local cup winner while in the South, the third placed team of the championship received this place.

== Qualified teams ==
The teams qualified through the regional football championships:

| Club | Qualified from |
| SV Prussia-Samland Königsberg | Baltic champions |
| SV Hindenburg Allenstein | Baltic runners-up |
| Beuthener SuSV | South Eastern German champions |
| Vorwärts RaSpo Gleiwitz | South Eastern German runners-up |
| Hertha BSC | Brandenburg champions |
| BFC Viktoria 89 | Brandenburg runners-up |
| Dresdner SC | Central German champions |
| PSV Chemnitz | Central German runners-up |
| Hamburger SV | Northern German champions |
| SV Arminia Hannover | Northern German runners-up |
| Schalke 04 | Western German champions |
| Fortuna Düsseldorf | Western German runners-up |
| VfL Benrath | Western German Cup winner |
| FSV Frankfurt | Southern German champions |
| TSV 1860 München | Southern German runners-up |
| SG Eintracht Frankfurt | Southern German 3rd placed team |

== Competition ==
=== Round of 16 ===
| Date | Match | | | Result | Stadium |
| 7 May 1933 | Hamburger SV | – | Eintracht Frankfurt | 1–4 (0–2) | Hamburg, Stadion Hoheluft |
| 7 May 1933 | VfL Benrath | – | TSV 1860 München | 0–2 (0–2) | Cologne, Müngersdorfer Stadion |
| 7 May 1933 | Fortuna Düsseldorf | – | Vorwärts RaSpo Gleiwitz | 9–0 (3–0) | Düsseldorf, Rheinstadion |
| 7 May 1933 | Dresdner SC | – | SV Arminia Hannover | 1–2 aet (0–1, 1–1) | Dresden, Stadion am Ostragehege |
| 7 May 1933 | Beuthener SuSV | – | SV Prussia-Samland Königsberg | 7–1 (3–1) | Beuthen, Hindenburg-Stadion |
| 7 May 1933 | FSV Frankfurt | – | PSV Chemnitz | 6–1 (1–1) | Frankfurt am Main, Riederwaldstadion |
| 7 May 1933 | Hindenburg Allenstein | – | Hertha BSC | 4–1 (2–0) | Allenstein, Waldstadion |
| 14 May 1933 | FC Schalke 04 | – | BFC Viktoria 1889 | 4–1 (1–0) | Dortmund, Kampfbahn Rothe Erde |

=== Quarter-finals ===
| Date | Match | | | Result | Stadium |
| 21 May 1933 | SV Arminia Hannover | – | Fortuna Düsseldorf | 0–3 (0–2) | Hanover, Hindenburg-Kampfbahn |
| 21 May 1933 | Eintracht Frankfurt | – | Hindenburg Allenstein | 12–2 (7–0) | Frankfurt am Main, Waldstadion |
| 21 May 1933 | FC Schalke 04 | – | FSV Frankfurt | 1–0 (0–0) | Essen, Stadion Uhlenkrug |
| 21 May 1933 | TSV 1860 München | – | Beuthener SuSV | 3–0 (2–0) | Nuremberg, Städtisches Stadion |

=== Semi-finals ===
| Date | Match | | | Result | Stadium |
| 28 May 1933 | Fortuna Düsseldorf | – | Eintracht Frankfurt | 4–0 (1–0) | Berlin, Platz des BFC Preussen |
| 28 May 1933 | FC Schalke 04 | – | TSV 1860 München | 4–0 (1–0) | Leipzig, Stadion Probstheida |

=== Final ===
The 1933 final saw Schalke as the favorite for the title, having already beaten Fortuna in the Western German championship in late April. In front of 60,000 – 20,000 of those Fortuna supporters – the club, who had not conceded a goal in the previous three rounds and scored 16, scored the first goal in the tenth minute. Schalke never got into their rhythm and when Fortuna scored the third goal five minutes from the end, the game was decided.

It was the third time that the final was held in Cologne, after 1912 and 1931 and had the second-best attendance until then, only surpassed by the 1923 final, held in Hamburg in front of 64,000.

| Date | Match | | | Result | Stadium | Attendance |
| 11 June 1933 | Fortuna Düsseldorf | – | FC Schalke 04 | 3–0 (1–0) | Cologne, Müngersdorfer Stadion | 60,000 |

Fortuna Düsseldorf:
| GK | (Nazi Germany) Willi Pesch |
| RB | (Nazi Germany) Kurt Trautwein |
| LB | (Nazi Germany) Paul Bornefeld |
| RH | (Nazi Germany) Paul Janes |
| CH | (Nazi Germany) Jakob Bender |
| LH | (Nazi Germany) Theo Breuer (c) |
| OR | (Nazi Germany) Paul Mehl 70' |
| IR | (Nazi Germany) Willi Wigold |
| CF | (Nazi Germany) Georg Hochgesang 85' |
| IL | (Nazi Germany) Felix Zwolanowski 10' |
| OL | (Nazi Germany) Stanislaus Kobierski |
Manager:
(Austria) Heinz Körner

FC Schalke 04:
| GK | (Nazi Germany) Hermann Mellage |
| RB | (Nazi Germany) Fritz Wohlgemuth |
| LB | (Nazi Germany) Ferdinand Zajons |
| RH | (Nazi Germany) Otto Tibulsky |
| CH | (Nazi Germany) Hans Bornemann |
| LH | (Nazi Germany) Valentin Przybylski |
| IR | (Nazi Germany) Fritz Szepan |
| IL | (Nazi Germany) Ernst Kuzorra (c) |
| OR | (Nazi Germany) Hans Rosen |
| CF | (Nazi Germany) Hermann Nattkämper |
| OL | (Nazi Germany) Emil Rothardt |
Manager:
(Nazi Germany) Kurt Otto

== Top scorers ==
The top scorer of the competition:

| | Name | Club | Goals |
|---|---|---|---|
| 1st | Karl Ehmer | Eintracht Frankfurt | 6 |
| 2nd | Georg Hochgesang | Fortuna Düsseldorf | 5 |
| 2nd | Paul Mehl | Fortuna Düsseldorf | 5 |
| 2nd | Felix Zwolanowski | Fortuna Düsseldorf | 5 |
| 5th | August Möbs | Eintracht Frankfurt | 4 |
