= 2010–11 2. Bundesliga =

37th season of the second-tier football league in Germany

2. Bundesliga
- Season: 2010–11
- Champions: Hertha BSC
- Promoted: Hertha BSC; FC Augsburg
- Relegated: VfL Osnabrück (via play-off); Rot-Weiß Oberhausen; Arminia Bielefeld
- Matches: 306
- Goals: 835 (2.73 per match)
- Top goalscorer: Nils Petersen (25 goals)
- Biggest home win: E. Cottbus 6–0 E. Aue; F. D'dorf 6–0 FSV F'furt
- Biggest away win: A. Aachen 0–5 Hertha; Paderborn 0–5 E. Cottbus
- Highest scoring: E. Cottbus 5–5 Karlsruhe
- Average attendance: 14,539

The 2010–11 2. Bundesliga was the 37th season of the 2. Bundesliga, Germany's second tier of its football league system. The season started on the weekend of 21 August 2010 and ended with the last games on 15 May 2011. The winter break was in effect between weekends around 18 December 2010 and 15 January 2011.

== Team information ==
As in the previous year, the league comprise the teams placed fourth through fifteenth of the 2009–10 season, the worst two teams from the 2009–10 Bundesliga, the best two teams from the 2009–10 3. Liga, the losers of the Bundesliga relegation play-off between the 16th-placed Bundesliga team and the third-placed 2. Bundesliga team and the winners of the 2. Bundesliga relegation play-off between the 16th-placed 2. Bundesliga team and the third-placed 3. Liga team.

2009–10 2. Bundesliga champions 1. FC Kaiserslautern, and runners-up FC St. Pauli were promoted to the Bundesliga. They were replaced by VfL Bochum and Hertha BSC who finished 17th and 18th respectively in the 2009–10 Bundesliga season.

TuS Koblenz and Rot-Weiß Ahlen were relegated after the 2009–10 season. They were replaced by 2009–10 3. Liga champions VfL Osnabrück and runners-up FC Erzgebirge Aue.

Two further spots were available through relegation/promotion play-offs and taken by FC Augsburg and FC Ingolstadt 04. Augsburg lost in their promotion play-off against 16th placed Bundesliga team 1. FC Nürnberg and thus retained their 2. Bundesliga spot, while Ingolstadt earned promotion from the 3. Liga by defeating FC Hansa Rostock.

=== Stadiums and locations ===
FC Ingolstadt 04 moved into the newly built Audi Sportpark for this season after spending their previous seasons at Tuja-Stadion. Fortuna Düsseldorf increased the capacity of their Esprit Arena from 51,500 to 54,400 by converting some seating areas into standing terraces. Also, the stadia of SpVgg Greuther Fürth and MSV Duisburg were renamed due to new naming rights contracts.

Location of teams in the 2010–11 2. Bundesliga

| Team | Location | Stadium | Stadium capacity |
|---|---|---|---|
| TSV 1860 Munich | Munich | Allianz Arena | 69,000 |
| Alemannia Aachen | Aachen | Tivoli | 32,960 |
| Arminia Bielefeld | Bielefeld | Schüco-Arena | 27,300 |
| FC Augsburg | Augsburg | Impuls Arena | 30,660 |
| VfL Bochum | Bochum | rewirPower-Stadion | 30,748 |
| MSV Duisburg | Duisburg | Schauinsland-Reisen-Arena | 31,500 |
| FC Energie Cottbus | Cottbus | Stadion der Freundschaft | 22,528 |
| FC Erzgebirge Aue | Aue | Erzgebirgsstadion | 16,000 ^{Note 1} |
| Fortuna Düsseldorf | Düsseldorf | Esprit Arena; Lena-Arena | 54,400; 20,055 ^{Note 2} |
| FSV Frankfurt | Frankfurt am Main | Frankfurter Volksbank Stadion | 10,826 |
| SpVgg Greuther Fürth | Fürth | Trolli Arena | 15,200 |
| Hertha BSC | Berlin | Olympiastadion | 74,244 |
| FC Ingolstadt 04 | Ingolstadt | Audi Sportpark | 15,445 |
| Karlsruher SC | Karlsruhe | Wildparkstadion | 29,699 |
| VfL Osnabrück | Osnabrück | Osnatel-Arena | 16,130 |
| SC Paderborn 07 | Paderborn | Energieteam Arena | 15,000 |
| Rot-Weiß Oberhausen | Oberhausen | Niederrheinstadion | 21,318 |
| 1. FC Union Berlin | Berlin | Alte Försterei | 19,000 |

Notes:

1. Erzgebirgsstadion is undergoing reconstruction. The capacity is thus estimated, with the exact number not to be known until work has been completed.
2. Fortuna Düsseldorf's home ground Esprit Arena was unavailable for the last three games of the season as it staged the Eurovision Song Contest 2011. A temporary stadium, the Lena-Arena, was constructed adjacent to the Esprit Arena to host the final home games of the season.

=== Personnel and sponsorship ===
| Team | Head coach | Team captain | Kitmaker | Shirt sponsor |
|---|---|---|---|---|
| Alemannia Aachen | (Germany) Peter Hyballa | (Germany) Benjamin Auer | Nike | AachenMünchener |
| FC Augsburg | (Netherlands) Jos Luhukay | (Germany) Uwe Möhrle | Jako | AL-KO |
| 1. FC Union Berlin | (Germany) Uwe Neuhaus | (Germany) Torsten Mattuschka | Do You Football | kfzteile24 |
| Arminia Bielefeld | (Germany) Ewald Lienen | (Germany) Rüdiger Kauf | Saller | Schüco |
| VfL Bochum | (Germany) Friedhelm Funkel | (Germany) Christoph Dabrowski | Do You Football | Netto |
| FC Energie Cottbus | (Germany) Claus-Dieter Wollitz | (Germany) Marc Andre Kruska | Umbro | Penny Market |
| MSV Duisburg | (Croatia) Milan Šašić | (Serbia) Srđan Baljak | uhlsport | Rheinpower |
| FC Erzgebirge Aue | (Germany) Rico Schmitt | (Poland) Tomasz Kos | Puma | Spar mit! Reisen |
| Fortuna Düsseldorf | (Germany) Norbert Meier | (Germany) Andreas Lambertz | Puma | Sparkasse Düsseldorf |
| FSV Frankfurt | (Germany) Hans-Jürgen Boysen | (Germany) Björn Schlicke | Saller | Hyundai |
| SpVgg Greuther Fürth | (Germany) Michael Büskens | (Germany) Thomas Kleine | Jako | Ergo Direkt Versicherungen |
| Hertha BSC | (Germany) Markus Babbel | (Croatia) Andre Mijatović | Nike | Deutsche Bahn |
| FC Ingolstadt 04 | (Germany) Benno Möhlmann | (Germany) Moritz Hartmann | Adidas | Audi |
| Karlsruher SC | (Germany) Rainer Scharinger | (Georgia (country)) Alexander Iashvili | Nike | Klaiber Markisen |
| TSV 1860 Munich | (Germany) Reiner Maurer | (Germany) Daniel Bierofka | Erima | Comarch |
| Rot-Weiß Oberhausen | (Germany) Theo Schneider | (Germany) Benjamin Reichert | uhlsport | Vatro |
| VfL Osnabrück | (Germany) Heiko Flottmann | (Germany) Angelo Barletta | Puma | Sparkasse Osnabrück |
| SC Paderborn 07 | (Germany) Andre Schubert | (Germany) Markus Krösche | Puma | Möbelhaus Finke |

=== Managerial changes ===
| Team | Outgoing manager(s) | Manner of departure | Date of vacancy | Position in table | Replaced by | Date of appointment |
|---|---|---|---|---|---|---|
| Hertha BSC | (Germany) Friedhelm Funkel | End of contract | 30 June 2010 | Off-season | (Germany) Markus Babbel | 1 July 2010 |
| VfL Bochum | (Germany) Dariusz Wosz | End of tenure as caretaker | 30 June 2010 | Off-season | (Germany) Friedhelm Funkel | 1 July 2010 |
| Arminia Bielefeld | (Germany) Detlev Dammeier (Germany) Frank Eulberg (Germany) Jörg Böhme | End of tenure as caretakers | 30 June 2010 | Off-season | (Germany) Christian Ziege | 1 July 2010 |
| TSV 1860 Munich | (Germany) Ewald Lienen | Mutual Consent | 30 June 2010 | Off-season | (Germany) Reiner Maurer | 1 July 2010 |
| Karlsruher SC | (Germany) Markus Schupp | Sacked | 31 October 2010 | 15th | (Germany) Uwe Rapolder | 22 November 2010 |
| FC Ingolstadt 04 | (Germany) Michael Wiesinger | Sacked | 6 November 2010 | 17th | (Germany) Benno Möhlmann | 7 November 2010 |
| Arminia Bielefeld | (Germany) Christian Ziege | Sacked | 6 November 2010 | 18th | (Germany) Ewald Lienen | 7 November 2010 |
| Rot-Weiß Oberhausen | (Germany) Hans-Günter Bruns | Sacked | 22 February 2011 | 16th | (Germany) Theo Schneider | 24 February 2011 |
| Karlsruher SC | (Germany) Uwe Rapolder | Sacked | 1 March 2011 | 16th | (Germany) Rainer Scharinger | 2 March 2011 |
| VfL Osnabrück | (Germany) Karsten Baumann | Sacked | 21 March 2011 | 16th | (United States) Joe Enochs | 21 March 2011 |
| VfL Osnabrück | (United States) Joe Enochs | End of tenure as caretaker | 11 April 2011 | 16th | (Germany) Heiko Flottmann | 11 April 2011 |

== League table ==
| Pos | Team | Pld | W | D | L | GF | GA | GD | Pts | Promotion, qualification or relegation |
|---|---|---|---|---|---|---|---|---|---|---|
| 1 | Hertha BSC (C, P) | 34 | 23 | 5 | 6 | 69 | 28 | +41 | 74 | Promotion to Bundesliga |
| 2 | FC Augsburg (P) | 34 | 19 | 8 | 7 | 58 | 27 | +31 | 65 | Promotion to Bundesliga |
| 3 | VfL Bochum | 34 | 20 | 5 | 9 | 49 | 35 | +14 | 65 | Qualification for promotion play-offs |
| 4 | Greuther Fürth | 34 | 17 | 10 | 7 | 47 | 27 | +20 | 61 | |
| 5 | Erzgebirge Aue | 34 | 16 | 8 | 10 | 40 | 37 | +3 | 56 | |
| 6 | Energie Cottbus | 34 | 16 | 7 | 11 | 65 | 52 | +13 | 55 | |
| 7 | Fortuna Düsseldorf | 34 | 16 | 5 | 13 | 49 | 39 | +10 | 53 | |
| 8 | MSV Duisburg | 34 | 15 | 7 | 12 | 53 | 38 | +15 | 52 | |
| 9 | 1860 Munich | 34 | 14 | 10 | 10 | 50 | 36 | +14 | 50 (Note: 1860 Munich were deducted two points because of providing insufficient information during the licensing process previous to this season.) | |
| 10 | Alemannia Aachen | 34 | 13 | 9 | 12 | 58 | 60 | −2 | 48 | |
| 11 | Union Berlin | 34 | 11 | 9 | 14 | 39 | 45 | −6 | 42 | |
| 12 | SC Paderborn | 34 | 10 | 9 | 15 | 32 | 47 | −15 | 39 | |
| 13 | FSV Frankfurt | 34 | 11 | 5 | 18 | 42 | 54 | −12 | 38 | |
| 14 | FC Ingolstadt | 34 | 9 | 10 | 15 | 40 | 46 | −6 | 37 | |
| 15 | Karlsruher SC | 34 | 8 | 9 | 17 | 46 | 72 | −26 | 33 | |
| 16 | VfL Osnabrück (R) | 34 | 8 | 7 | 19 | 40 | 62 | −22 | 31 | Qualification for relegation play-offs |
| 17 | Rot-Weiß Oberhausen (R) | 34 | 7 | 7 | 20 | 30 | 65 | −35 | 28 | Relegation to 3. Liga |
| 18 | Arminia Bielefeld (R) | 34 | 4 | 8 | 22 | 28 | 65 | −37 | 17 (Note: Arminia Bielefeld were deducted three points because of accessing league security funds worth €1.25M.) | Relegation to 3. Liga |

Source: bundesliga.de
Rules for classification: 1) points; 2) goal difference; 3) number of goals scored.
(C) Champions; (P) Promoted; (R) Relegated

== Results ==
| Home \ Away | AAC | AUE | FCA | BSC | UNB | DSC | BOC | FCE | DUI | F95 | FSV | SGF | FCI | KSC | M60 | RWO | OSN | SCP |
|---|---|---|---|---|---|---|---|---|---|---|---|---|---|---|---|---|---|---|
| Alemannia Aachen | — | 1–5 | 1–3 | 0–5 | 2–2 | 1–1 | 1–3 | 2–3 | 2–2 | 0–0 | 2–1 | 2–2 | 2–1 | 4–2 | 2–1 | 4–0 | 2–1 | 2–0 |
| Erzgebirge Aue | 2–1 | — | 3–2 | 0–2 | 0–0 | 3–0 | 1–0 | 1–2 | 1–0 | 1–0 | 3–1 | 0–0 | 1–1 | 1–1 | 1–0 | 2–0 | 0–1 | 1–0 |
| FC Augsburg | 1–2 | 2–1 | — | 1–1 | 2–1 | 3–0 | 0–1 | 4–0 | 0–0 | 5–2 | 2–1 | 0–0 | 2–0 | 3–1 | 1–2 | 2–0 | 2–2 | 1–0 |
| Hertha BSC | 0–0 | 2–0 | 2–1 | — | 1–2 | 3–1 | 2–0 | 2–2 | 0–2 | 4–2 | 3–1 | 2–0 | 3–1 | 4–0 | 1–2 | 3–2 | 4–0 | 2–0 |
| Union Berlin | 2–1 | 1–1 | 0–0 | 1–1 | — | 2–2 | 0–1 | 4–2 | 2–0 | 1–0 | 2–0 | 1–2 | 1–1 | 3–1 | 0–1 | 2–1 | 3–3 | 0–2 |
| Arminia Bielefeld | 1–3 | 0–1 | 0–2 | 1–3 | 1–2 | — | 2–2 | 1–2 | 1–3 | 0–2 | 1–1 | 1–4 | 1–0 | 2–1 | 0–3 | 3–3 | 2–1 | 1–1 |
| VfL Bochum | 1–1 | 2–0 | 0–2 | 0–2 | 3–0 | 3–1 | — | 1–0 | 3–1 | 2–0 | 1–0 | 0–2 | 1–4 | 1–1 | 3–2 | 2–1 | 2–1 | 3–0 |
| Energie Cottbus | 3–3 | 6–0 | 1–1 | 0–1 | 0–0 | 2–1 | 2–1 | — | 3–1 | 2–0 | 2–1 | 2–0 | 1–2 | 5–5 | 0–0 | 3–1 | 2–0 | 3–1 |
| MSV Duisburg | 3–2 | 3–1 | 1–0 | 0–1 | 0–1 | 1–2 | 0–1 | 2–2 | — | 1–0 | 1–3 | 2–0 | 4–1 | 3–0 | 2–1 | 3–0 | 4–1 | 3–1 |
| Fortuna Düsseldorf | 3–1 | 3–0 | 1–0 | 1–2 | 3–0 | 2–0 | 0–1 | 3–1 | 1–0 | — | 6–0 | 1–0 | 3–1 | 1–0 | 1–2 | 3–0 | 2–1 | 0–0 |
| FSV Frankfurt | 1–3 | 0–2 | 1–2 | 0–1 | 2–1 | 2–1 | 0–1 | 3–2 | 0–4 | 1–0 | — | 0–0 | 1–2 | 1–2 | 2–1 | 4–0 | 4–1 | 2–0 |
| Greuther Fürth | 1–1 | 1–2 | 1–1 | 0–2 | 1–0 | 1–0 | 1–1 | 3–1 | 2–1 | 1–1 | 1–0 | — | 1–0 | 4–1 | 1–0 | 0–0 | 3–0 | 2–0 |
| FC Ingolstadt | 2–1 | 0–0 | 1–4 | 1–1 | 1–0 | 1–0 | 3–0 | 1–2 | 1–1 | 3–0 | 0–1 | 0–2 | — | 1–1 | 1–1 | 1–2 | 0–1 | 1–2 |
| Karlsruher SC | 3–0 | 1–1 | 0–1 | 2–6 | 3–2 | 1–0 | 0–2 | 1–0 | 3–1 | 2–2 | 0–2 | 1–1 | 1–4 | — | 2–4 | 4–0 | 2–2 | 2–1 |
| 1860 Munich | 2–1 | 0–0 | 0–2 | 1–0 | 1–0 | 0–0 | 1–3 | 4–0 | 1–1 | 1–1 | 3–3 | 3–0 | 1–1 | 5–1 | — | 1–1 | 3–1 | 0–1 |
| Rot-Weiß Oberhausen | 1–2 | 1–2 | 0–3 | 1–3 | 0–2 | 3–0 | 3–1 | 0–4 | 0–0 | 1–2 | 1–0 | 1–4 | 1–1 | 2–1 | 0–0 | — | 1–0 | 2–0 |
| VfL Osnabrück | 1–3 | 3–2 | 0–2 | 2–0 | 4–1 | 0–0 | 1–3 | 2–0 | 1–3 | 2–3 | 1–1 | 0–2 | 2–1 | 0–0 | 0–1 | 3–1 | — | 2–2 |
| SC Paderborn | 1–3 | 0–1 | 1–1 | 1–0 | 2–0 | 3–1 | 0–0 | 0–5 | 0–0 | 3–0 | 2–2 | 0–4 | 1–1 | 3–0 | 3–2 | 0–0 | 1–0 | — |

Source: DFB
Legend: Blue = home team win; Yellow = draw; Red = away team win.

== Promotion/relegation play-offs ==
VfL Osnabrück, having finished the season in 16th place, faced 3rd-placed 3. Liga side Dynamo Dresden for a two-legged play-off. Dresden, who played at home first, won 4–2 on aggregate.

20 May 2011
20:30 CEST

| Dynamo Dresden | 1–1 | VfL Osnabrück |
|---|---|---|
| Koch 76' | Report (in German) | 66' (o.g.) Jungnickel |

Glücksgas-Stadion, Dresden
Attendance: 28,760
Referee: Manuel Gräfe (Berlin)

24 May 2011
20:30 CEST

| VfL Osnabrück | 1–3 (a. e. t.) | Dynamo Dresden |
|---|---|---|
| Mauersberger 45' | Report (in German) | 61' Fiel; 94' Schahin; 119' Koch |

Osnatel-Arena, Osnabrück
Attendance: 16,600
Referee: Thorsten Kinhöfer (Herne)

Dynamo Dresden won 4–2 on aggregate; Dynamo promoted, Osnabrück relegated

== Statistics ==
=== Top goalscorers ===
Source: kicker (German)

25 goals

- (Germany) Nils Petersen (Energie Cottbus)

20 goals

- (Germany) Benjamin Auer (Alemannia Aachen)

16 goals

- (Germany) Benjamin Lauth (1860 Munich)

15 goals

- (Germany) Sascha Mölders (FSV Frankfurt)
- (Colombia) Adrián Ramos (Hertha BSC)

14 goals

- (Angola) Nando Rafael (FC Augsburg)

13 goals

- (Germany) Pierre-Michel Lasogga (Hertha BSC)
- (Germany) Stefan Leitl (FC Ingolstadt 04)

10 goals

- (Germany) Stephan Hain (FC Augsburg)
- (North Korea) Jong Tae-Se (VfL Bochum)
- (Romania) Emil Jula (Energie Cottbus)
- (Brazil) Raffael (Hertha BSC)
- (Hungary) Zoltán Stieber (Alemannia Aachen)

=== Top assistants ===
Source: kicker (German)

17 assists

- (Hungary) Zoltán Stieber (Alemannia Aachen)

12 assists

- (Australia) Nikita Rukavytsya (Hertha BSC)

10 assists

- (Colombia) Adrián Ramos (Hertha BSC)

9 assists

- (Germany) Daniel Halfar (1860 Munich)
- (Romania) Emil Jula (Energie Cottbus)
- (Germany) Stefan Leitl (FC Ingolstadt 04)
- (Germany) Michael Thurk (FC Augsburg)

8 assists

- (Albania) Skerdilaid Curri (Erzgebirge Aue)
- (Germany) Jürgen Gjasula (FSV Frankfurt)
- (Georgia (country)) Alexander Iashvili (Karlsruher SC)
- (Germany) Sascha Rösler (Fortuna Düsseldorf)
- (Germany) Timo Staffeldt (Karlsruher SC)
