= Borussia Dortmund II =

German football club

- Full name: Ballspielverein Borussia 09 e.V. Dortmund
- Nicknames: Die Borussen (The Borussians); Die Schwarzgelben (The Black and Yellows); Der BVB (The BVB)
- Founded: 1909; 117 years ago
- Ground: Stadion Rote Erde
- Capacity: 9,999
- President: Reinhard Rauball
- Head coach: Daniel Ríos
- League: Regionalliga West (IV)
- 2025–26: Regionalliga West, 5th of 18
Home colours	Away colours	Third colours

Borussia Dortmund II are the reserve team of Borussia Dortmund, currently playing in the Regionalliga West, at Stadion Rote Erde. Until 2005, the team played as Borussia Dortmund Amateure. The team won the Regionalliga West in 2009 and became the second reserve team to play in the third tier, after Bayern Munich II. They were immediately relegated back to the fourth level, but won the Regionalliga West again in 2011–12. They were relegated in 2015 and did not return until the 2021–22 season.

== History ==
=== From Ambasi to Oberliga (until 1997) ===
The second team of Borussia Dortmund initially played at the Kreisliga and was promoted to the Bezirksliga in 1957. After a third-place finish in 1957, they were promoted into the Landesliga Westfalen in 1964. In 1969, Borussia Dortmund II won the Landesliga Westfalen eight points clear of Teutonia Lippstadt, gaining promotion into the Westfalenliga, the highest amateur league in Westphalia at the time. Three years later, the team got relegated into the Landesliga, and even into the Bezirksliga in 1974.

In 1977, the team gained promotion again into the Landesliga. In the 1977–78 season, the team finished fifth, missing out the promotion play-off by just two points. The team returned to the Westfalenliga in 1983 and went on to become one of the leading teams in the league. In 1987, Borussia Dortmund II finished three points ahead of SV Langendreer 04 and gained promotion into the Oberliga Westfalen. The team finished fourth on the table in 1989, 1991 and 1993, before finishing eighth in 1994, missing out promotion into the then newly established Regionalliga West/Südwest.

Meanwhile, the team reached the final of the 1991 Westphalia Cup, losing 1–6 against Arminia Bielefeld. Because of that, the team was eligible for the first and only time for the DFB Cup. The team met 1. FC Saarbrucken in the first round of the 1991/92 season, with the Saarland club going through at 5–2 in front of 1,800 fans at the Stadion Rote Erde.

=== Between Regionalliga and Oberliga (1994 to 2007) ===
Borussia Dortmund continued to play in the Oberliga Westfalen and was runner-up behind FC Gütersloh in 1995. In 1998, under the guidance of coach Michael Skibbe, the team were crowned champions of Oberliga Westfalen with a ten-point advantage ahead of FC Schalke 04 II. In the following season in the Regionalliga, the team finished fourth last, but avoided the drop as Wuppertaler SV and FC 08 Homburg were relegated for failing to pay dues to the league. In 2000, under coach Edwin Boekamp, the team managed a mid-table finish and qualified for the newly created two-tier Regionalliga.

The team was relegated at the end of the 2000–01 season, finishing second last, but won promotion back into the league under coach Horst Köppel the following year. After a fifth-place finish in the 2002–03 season, the team stayed in the Regionalliga for a further two years and was relegated back to the Oberliga at the end of the 2004–05 campaign on goal difference behind Chemnitzer FC. The team again returned after one year, this time under Theo Schneider, and avoided relegation on goal difference ahead of Holstein Kiel in the 2006–07 Regionalliga West season.

=== 2007–present ===
In 2008, Borussia Dortmund II finished thirteenth in the Regionalliga and failed to qualify for the new 3. Liga by four points. A year later, the team won the Regionalliga West three points ahead of Kaiserslautern under their coach Theo Schneider. Finishing third from bottom in the 2009–10 season, the team was relegated. In summer 2011, David Wagner took over as coach. With a 5–3 win at Wuppertaler SV on the final day of the 2011–12 season, the team gained promotion into the 3. Liga again.

On 9 August 2014, the Stadion Rote Erde was sold out with 9,999 spectators for the first time in its history at a home match of Borussia Dortmund II, for a match against SSV Jahn Regensburg in the 2014–15 3. Liga season. The game was part of a family day and the inauguration of a fan shop near the stadium.

On 5 June 2021, Borussia Dortmund II confirmed their promotion back to the 3. Liga, as they won the 2020–21 Regionalliga West with a 2–1 win over Wuppertaler SV.

== Honours ==
- Regionalliga West
  - Winners: 2008–09, 2011–12, 2020–21
- Oberliga Westfalen
  - Winners: 1997–98, 2001–02, 2005–06
  - Runners-up: 1994–95
- Westphalia Cup
  - Runners-up: 1990–91

== Recent seasons ==
The recent season-by-season performance of the club:

Year	Division	Tier	Position
1999–2000	Regionalliga West/Südwest	III	10th
2000–01	Regionalliga Nord	III	16th ↓
2001–02	Oberliga Westfalen	IV	1st ↑
2002–03	Regionalliga Nord	III	5th
2003–04	Regionalliga Nord	III	10th
2004–05	Regionalliga Nord	III	16th ↓
2005–06	Oberliga Westfalen	IV	1st ↑
2006–07	Regionalliga Nord	III	14th
2007–08	Regionalliga Nord	III	13th
2008–09	Regionalliga West	IV	1st ↑
2009–10	3. Liga	III	18th ↓
2010–11	Regionalliga West	IV	6th
2011–12	Regionalliga West	IV	1st ↑
2012–13	3. Liga	III	16th
2013–14	3. Liga	III	14th
2014–15	3. Liga	III	18th ↓
2015–16	Regionalliga West	IV	4th
2016–17	Regionalliga West	IV	2nd
2017–18	Regionalliga West	IV	4th
2018–19	Regionalliga West	IV	5th
2019–20	Regionalliga West	IV	9th
2020–21	Regionalliga West	IV	1st ↑
2021–22	3. Liga	III	9th
2022–23	3. Liga	III	13th
2023–24	3. Liga	III	11th
2024–25	3. Liga	III	17th ↓
2025–26	Regionalliga West	IV	5th

- With the introduction of the Regionalligas in 1994 and the 3. Liga in 2008 as the new third tier, below the 2. Bundesliga, all leagues below dropped one tier. In 2000 all clubs from the disbanded Regionalliga West/Südwest from North Rhine-Westphalia joined the Regionalliga Nord, in 2008 these clubs left the league again to join the new Regionalliga West.

↑ Promoted	↓ Relegated

== Stadium ==
Borussia Dortmund II plays their matches at the Stadion Rote Erde, which has a capacity of 9,999 for league matches. The stadium belongs to the City of Dortmund. The stadium came under criticism several times due to inadequate space, lack of soil heating and the poor condition of the infrastructure. Because of this, Borussia Dortmund is considering the purchase of the stadium.

== Players ==
=== Current squad ===
The team currently competes in the Regionalliga West. It also participates in the Premier League International Cup. Daniel Ríos has been the head coach since August 2025. Players in bold are those who have been called-up and/or featured with the senior squad.

As of 1 August 2026

Note: Flags indicate national team as defined under FIFA eligibility rules; some limited exceptions apply. Players may hold more than one non-FIFA nationality.

No.	Pos.	Nation	Player
1	GK	TUR	Yılmaz Aktaş
3	DF	GER	Finn Fuchs
4	DF	NED	Jesper Verlaat
6	MF	MAR	**Ayman Azhil**
8	MF	GER	Felix Paschke
9	FW	GER	Bennedikt Wüstenhagen
10	FW	GER	Joseph Boyamba
11	FW	GER	Arne Wessels
13	MF	GER	Connor Krempicki
18	MF	GER	**Mussa Kaba**
19	FW	GER	Pharell Kegni
20	MF	GER	Luke Fahrenhorst
21	DF	AUT	Mario Pejazic

No.	Pos.	Nation	Player
22	FW	BEL	Diego Ngambia
23	DF	GER	Malik Hodroj
27	DF	GER	Beni Ngyombo
28	DF	GER	Ismael Mansaray
29	FW	GER	Kevin Mutove
31	GK	GER	**Silas Ostrzinski**
33	GK	GER	Aaron Held
34	MF	GER	Tim Degener
36	MF	GER	Fadi Zarqelain
37	DF	GER	Nanitonda Quiala
43	MF	JPN	Takato Yamamoto (on loan from Gamba Osaka)
45	FW	ANG	Daniel Sumbu (on loan from Sturm Graz)

== Current staff ==
Position	Name
Manager	(Germany) Daniel Ríos
Assistant managers	(Germany) Patrick Fritsch (Portugal) Miguel Moreira
Goalkeeping coach	(Germany) Thomas Feldhoff
Athletic coach	(Germany) Benjamin Schüßler
Video analysts	(Germany) Jan-Frederik Luig (Germany) Alexander Cerny
Team manager	(Germany) Ingo Preuß
Scout	(Germany) Jan Winking
Physiotherapist	(Germany) Markus Langer
Educational assistant	(Germany) Matthias Röben

== Head coaches ==
Duration	Head coach
1986–1992	(Germany) Lothar Huber
1992–1994	(Germany) Michael Henke
1994–1997	(Germany) Edwin Boekamp
1997–1998	(Germany) Michael Skibbe
1998–1999	(Germany) Theo Schneider
1999–2001	(Germany) Edwin Boekamp
2001–2004	(Germany) Horst Köppel

Duration	Head coach
2004–2005	(Germany) Uwe Neuhaus
2005–2011	(Germany) Theo Schneider
2011	(Germany) Hannes Wolf
2011–2015	(Germany) David Wagner
2015–2017	(Germany) Daniel Farke
2017–2019	(Germany) Jan Siewert
2019	(Croatia) Alen Terzic

Duration	Head coach
2019–2020	(Denmark) Mike Tullberg
2020–2022	(Germany) Enrico Maaßen
2022–2023	(Germany) Christian Preußer
2023–2025	(Germany) Jan Zimmermann
2025	(Denmark) Mike Tullberg
2025–	(Germany) Daniel Ríos
