= Lena-Arena =

Football stadium

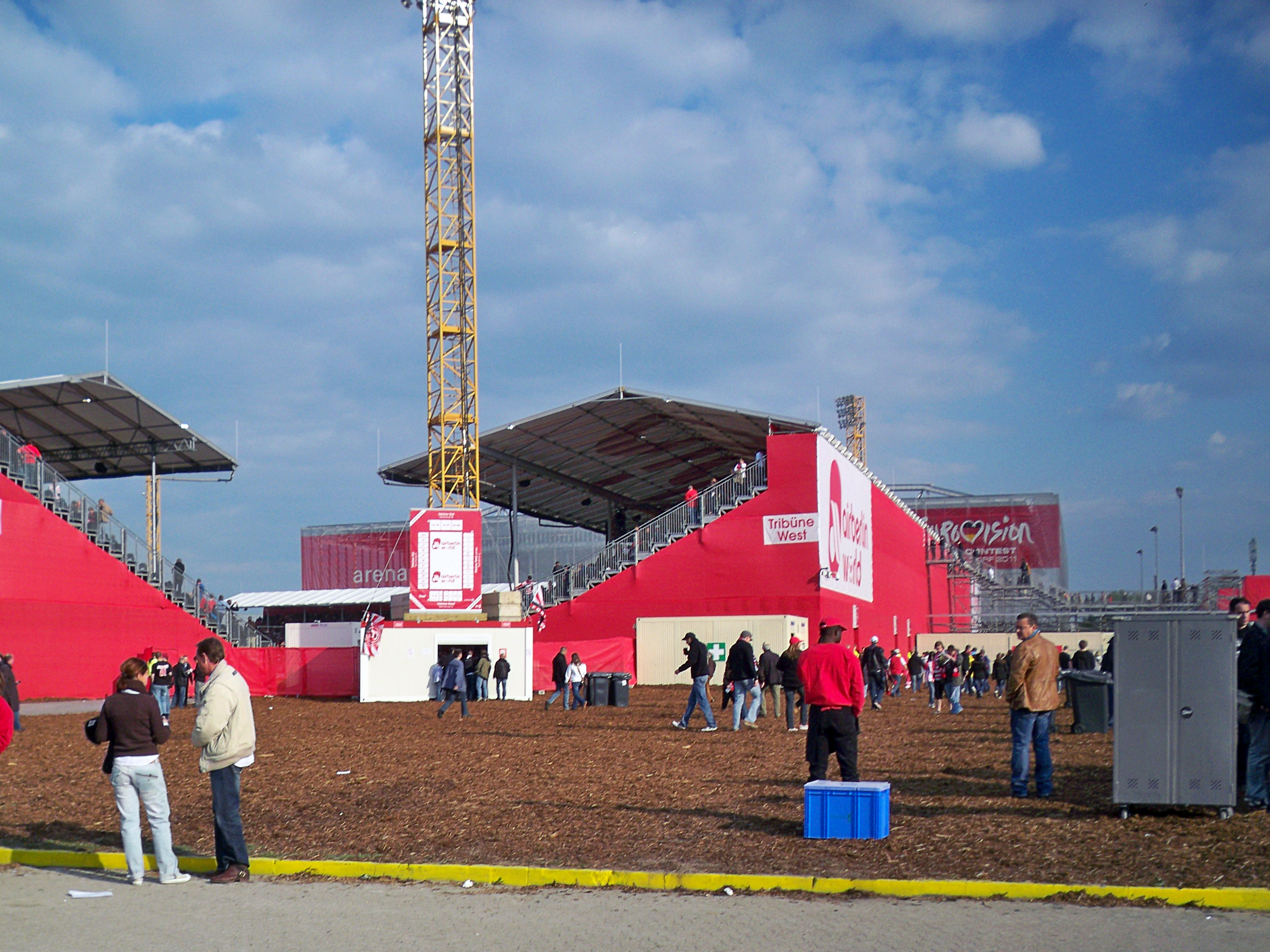
- Exterior view of the Lena-Arena
- Interactive map of Lena-Arena
- Location: Düsseldorf, Germany
- Coordinates: 51°15′49.27″N 6°43′47.79″E
- Capacity: 20,168
- Record attendance: 20,100

Construction
- Built: January–March 2011
- Opened: 26 March 2011
- Closed: May 2011
- Demolished: 2011
- Cost: €2.8 million
- Architect: Nussli Group

Tenant
- Fortuna Düsseldorf (April–May 2011)

The Lena-Arena, also known as the airberlin world for sponsorship purposes, was Fortuna Düsseldorf's temporary stadium during the hosting of the Eurovision Song Contest 2011 at Fortuna's ESPRIT Arena.

== History ==
The stadium was named for Lena Meyer-Landrut, after her win representing Germany at the Eurovision Song Contest 2010. The 2011 edition of the contest was held in Düsseldorf in Fortuna Düsseldorf's ESPRIT Arena. As a result of this, Fortuna's stadium was rendered unusable for football for the final three home games of the 2010–11 2. Bundesliga season. Moves to the neighbouring cities of Mönchengladbach, Köln, Bochum, and Leverkusen were ruled out, as well as an expansion Fortuna Düsseldorf's previous stadium, the Paul-Janes-Stadion, for security reasons. Constructed by the Swiss-based Nussli Group in under 50 days, construction began in January 2011 on a budget of €2.8 million on Fortuna's training ground.

With a capacity of 20,168 and sponsored by Air Berlin and stylised as airberlin world, the stadium hosted its first game on 26 March 2011, with Germany under-17 beating Ukraine U17 2–0. Fortuna Düsseldorf won all three of their games hosted at the Lena-Arena, with Sascha Rösler scoring in every game hosted at the stadium. The club hold the unique record of winning every game in their home stadium. The stadium was dismantled at the end of May 2011.

== List of games ==
26 March 2011 2011 UEFA European U17 Championship elite round	Germany U17	2–0	Ukraine U17	Düsseldorf
14:00	Perrey 10'; Yeşil 31'	Report		Stadium: Lena-Arena; Attendance: 6,300; Referee: Padraigh Sutton (Ireland)

15 April 2011 2. Bundesliga	Fortuna Düsseldorf	3–0	1. FC Union Berlin	Düsseldorf
17:00	Rösler 17'; Lambertz 36'; Ilsø 67'	Report		Stadium: Lena-Arena; Attendance: 18,900; Referee: Christian Fischer

24 April 2011 2. Bundesliga	Fortuna Düsseldorf	2–0	Arminia Bielefeld	Düsseldorf
12:30	Rösler 41'; Lambertz 70'	Report		Stadium: Lena-Arena; Attendance: 18,100; Referee: Thorsten Schriever

8 May 2011 2. Bundesliga	Fortuna Düsseldorf	3–1	Alemannia Aachen	Düsseldorf
12:30	Langeneke 14'; Rösler 22'; Beister 70'	Report	Stehle 45'	Stadium: Lena-Arena; Attendance: 20,100; Referee: Peter Sippel
