= Neuschäfer =

Neuschäfer is a surname. Notable people with the surname include:

- Carl Neuschäfer (1879–1946), German Baptist priest
- Hans Neuschäfer (1931–2020), German footballer
- Kirsten Neuschäfer (born 1982), South African sailor
- Wilfried Neuschäfer (born 1970), German footballer
