= Kurt Krüger (footballer) =

German footballer

Personal information
- Date of birth: 4 October 1920
- Date of death: 19 January 2003 (aged 82)
- Position: Midfielder

Senior career*
Years	Team	Apps	(Gls)
- Fortuna Düsseldorf

International career
1940	Germany	1	(0)
- * Club domestic league appearances and goals

Kurt Krüger (4 October 1920 – 19 January 2003) was a German international footballer.
