= Christoph Semmler =

German footballer

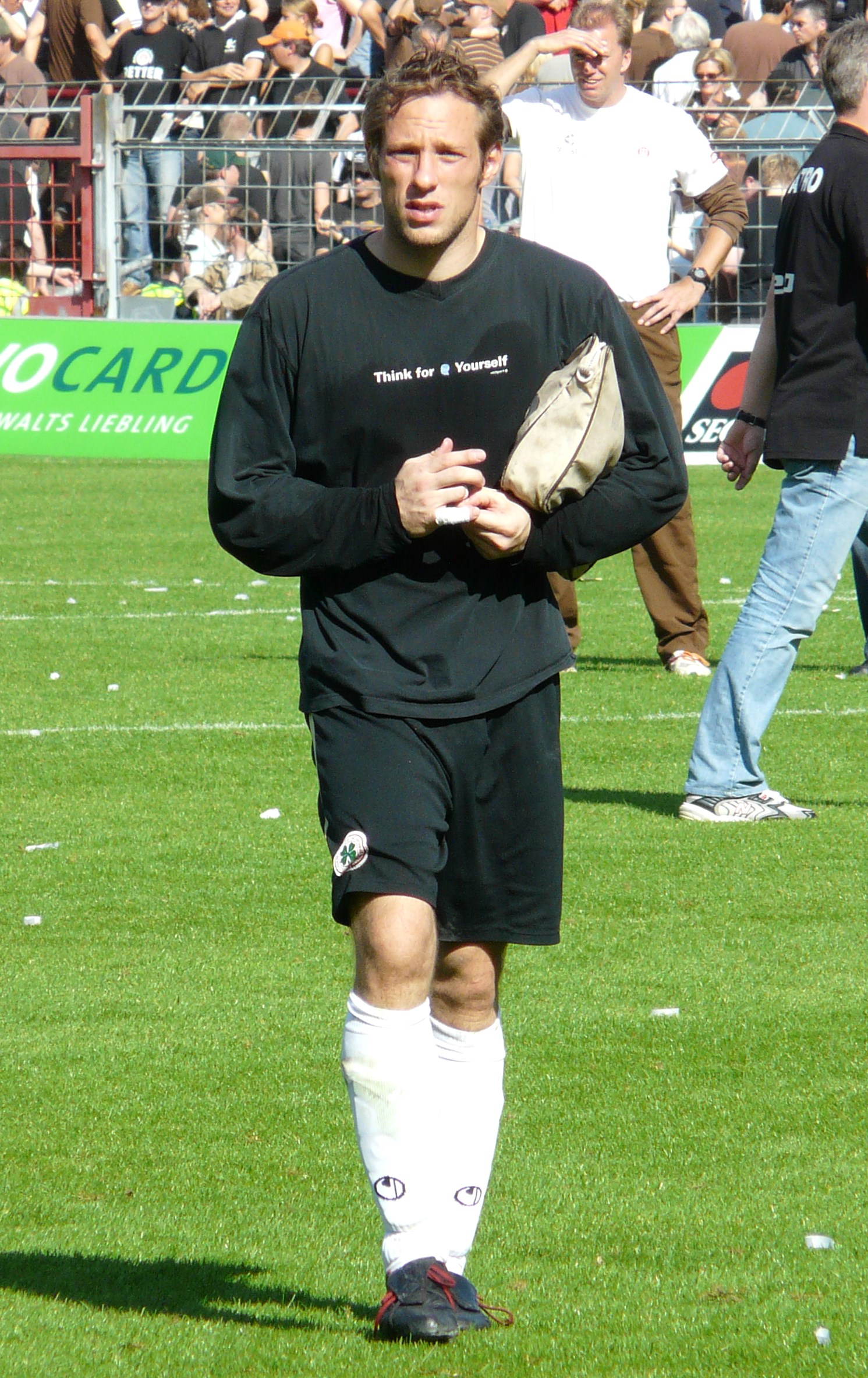
- Semmler in 2008

Personal information
- Date of birth: 3 March 1980 (age 46)
- Place of birth: Wilhelmshaven, West Germany
- Height: 1.84 m (6 ft 0 in)
- Position: Goalkeeper

Team information
- Current team: Fortuna Düsseldorf (goalkeeper coach)

Youth career
- Suchsdorfer SV
- Holstein Kiel
- 1997–2000: Borussia Mönchengladbach

Senior career*
| Years | Team | Apps | (Gls) |
| 2000–2001 | Schwarz-Weiß Essen | 10 | (0) |
| 2001–2002 | Rheydter SV | 34 | (0) |
| 2002–2003 | Germania Ratingen | 5 | (0) |
| 2003–2005 | Borussia Mönchengladbach II | 11 | (0) |
| 2005–2010 | Rot-Weiß Oberhausen | 94 | (0) |
| 2010–2011 | Os Belenenses | 26 | (0) |
| 2011–2013 | Wuppertaler SV | 58 | (0) |
| 2014–2015 | Borussia Mönchengladbach II | 0 | (0) |
| Total | | 238 | (0) |
- * Club domestic league appearances and goals

Christoph Semmler (born 3 March 1980) is a German former professional footballer who played as a goalkeeper. He works as goalkeeper coach of Fortuna Düsseldorf.

== Playing career ==
Semmler made his professional league level debut in the 2. Bundesliga for Rot-Weiß Oberhausen on 17 August 2008 when he started a game against TuS Koblenz.

== Coaching career ==
From the summer 2013 until the summer 2018, Semmler worked as a goalkeeper coach for Borussia Mönchengladbach II and the club's youth teams. In May 2015, Semmler held a training camp for goalkeepers in Addis Ababa, Ethiopia.

On 26 June 2018, Semmler was appointed goalkeeper coach of Belgian club K.A.S. Eupen. He left the club again at the end of the season. On 4 January 2020, he was hired goalkeeper coach of Bundesliga club Fortuna Düsseldorf.
