= Kurt Borkenhagen =

German footballer

Personal information
- Date of birth: 30 December 1919
- Place of birth: Germany
- Date of death: May 2012 (aged 92)
- Position: Defender

Senior career*
Years	Team	Apps	(Gls)
1944–1946	Düsseldorfer SV 04		
1946–1956	Fortuna Düsseldorf		

International career
1952	West Germany	1	(0)
- * Club domestic league appearances and goals

Kurt Borkenhagen (30 December 1919 – May 2012) was a German international footballer who played for Fortuna Düsseldorf. Once he played in the National Team (1952).
