= Theo Schneider =

German footballer

Personal information
- Date of birth: 23 August 1960 (age 66)
- Place of birth: Dortmund, West Germany
- Height: 1.74 m (5 ft 9 in)
- Position: Midfielder

Youth career
- Borussia Dortmund

Senior career*
Years	Team	Apps	(Gls)
1978–1982	Borussia Dortmund	44	(6)
1982–1983	1. FC Nürnberg	27	(1)
1983–1986	Rot-Weiß Oberhausen	98	(23)
1986–1988	1. FC Saarbrücken	59	(13)
1988–1992	VfR Sölde		
1992–1993	Arminia Bielefeld		

International career
1979–1981	West Germany U-21	10	(0)

Managerial career
- 1994–1998: Arminia Bielefeld
- 1998–2004: Borussia Dortmund (youth team director)
- 2004–2011: Borussia Dortmund II
- 2011: Rot-Weiß Oberhausen
- 2012–2014: SC Wiedenbrück 2000
- 2015–: Ferencváros (youth advisor)
- * Club domestic league appearances and goals

Theo Schneider (born 23 August 1960 in Dortmund) is a German former footballer who became a coach. He was manager of SC Wiedenbrück 2000 until April 2014.
