= Theo Breuer (footballer) =

German footballer (1909–1980)

Personal information
- Date of birth: 15 March 1909
- Place of birth: Düsseldorf
- Date of death: 8 December 1980 (aged 71)
- Position: Forward

Senior career*
Years	Team	Apps	(Gls)
1925−1938	Fortuna Düsseldorf		

International career
1933	Germany	2	(0)

Managerial career
- 1949: Fortuna Düsseldorf
- 1960: Fortuna Düsseldorf
- * Club domestic league appearances and goals

Theo Breuer (15 March 1909 – 8 December 1980) was a German footballer who played as a forward for Fortuna Düsseldorf. He made two appearances for the Germany national team in 1933. He later had two stints as a manager of Fortuna Düsseldorf.
