= Willi Lindner =

German footballer and manager

Personal information
- Full name: Willi Lindner
- Date of birth: 27 June 1910
- Place of birth: Frankfurt, Germany
- Date of death: 5 March 1944 (aged 33)
- Place of death: Eastern Front
- Position: Midfielder

Youth career
- 1921–1928: Union Niederrad

Senior career*
Years	Team	Apps	(Gls)
1928–1931	Rot-Weiss Frankfurt		
1932	Tennis Borussia Berlin		
1932–1935	Eintracht Frankfurt	39	(23)
1935	Tura Leipzig		
1935–1938	Reichsbahn/Rot-Weiss Frankfurt		
1938–1944	Eintracht Frankfurt	14	(4)

International career
1933	Germany	1	(0)

Managerial career
- 1941: Eintracht Frankfurt (caretaker manager)
- * Club domestic league appearances and goals

Willi Lindner (27 June 1910 – 5 March 1944) was a German footballer.

The Frankfurter began playing football in 1921 at Union Niederrad before moving to Rot-Weiß Frankfurt in 1928. He played there until 1931. From July 1931 to September 1932 he was active at Tennis Borussia Berlin until he joined Eintracht Frankfurt in September 1932. He played 53 championship games for Eintracht until 1943, in which he scored 27 goals.

While signed at Eintracht Frankfurt he gained his only cap for the Germany national football team in Berlin against France. Then manager Otto Nerz substituted him for Richard Hofmann in the half time break since the crowd wanted to see Hofmann play.

Lindner fought in World War II, and died on the Eastern Front in 1944.
