= Hans Neuschäfer =

German footballer (1931–2020)

Personal information
- Full name: Hans Neuschäfer
- Date of birth: 23 November 1931
- Place of birth: Düsseldorf, Germany
- Date of death: 9 September 2020 (aged 88)
- Position: Midfielder

Senior career*
Years	Team	Apps	(Gls)
1950–1953	TuRu Düsseldorf		
1953–1956	Viktoria Aschaffenburg		
1956–1958	Fortuna Düsseldorf		
1963–1964	FC Biel-Bienne		
1965–1966	Viktoria Köln		

International career
1956	West Germany	1	(1)

Managerial career
- 1963: FC Biel-Bienne
- 1969–1971: Viktoria Köln
- * Club domestic league appearances and goals

Hans Neuschäfer (23 November 1931 – 9 September 2020) was a German footballer who played as a midfielder for TuRu Düsseldorf, Viktoria Aschaffenburg, Fortuna Düsseldorf, FC Biel-Bienne and Viktoria Köln. He also played once for the Germany national team in 1956.
