= Benjamin Schüßler =

German footballer

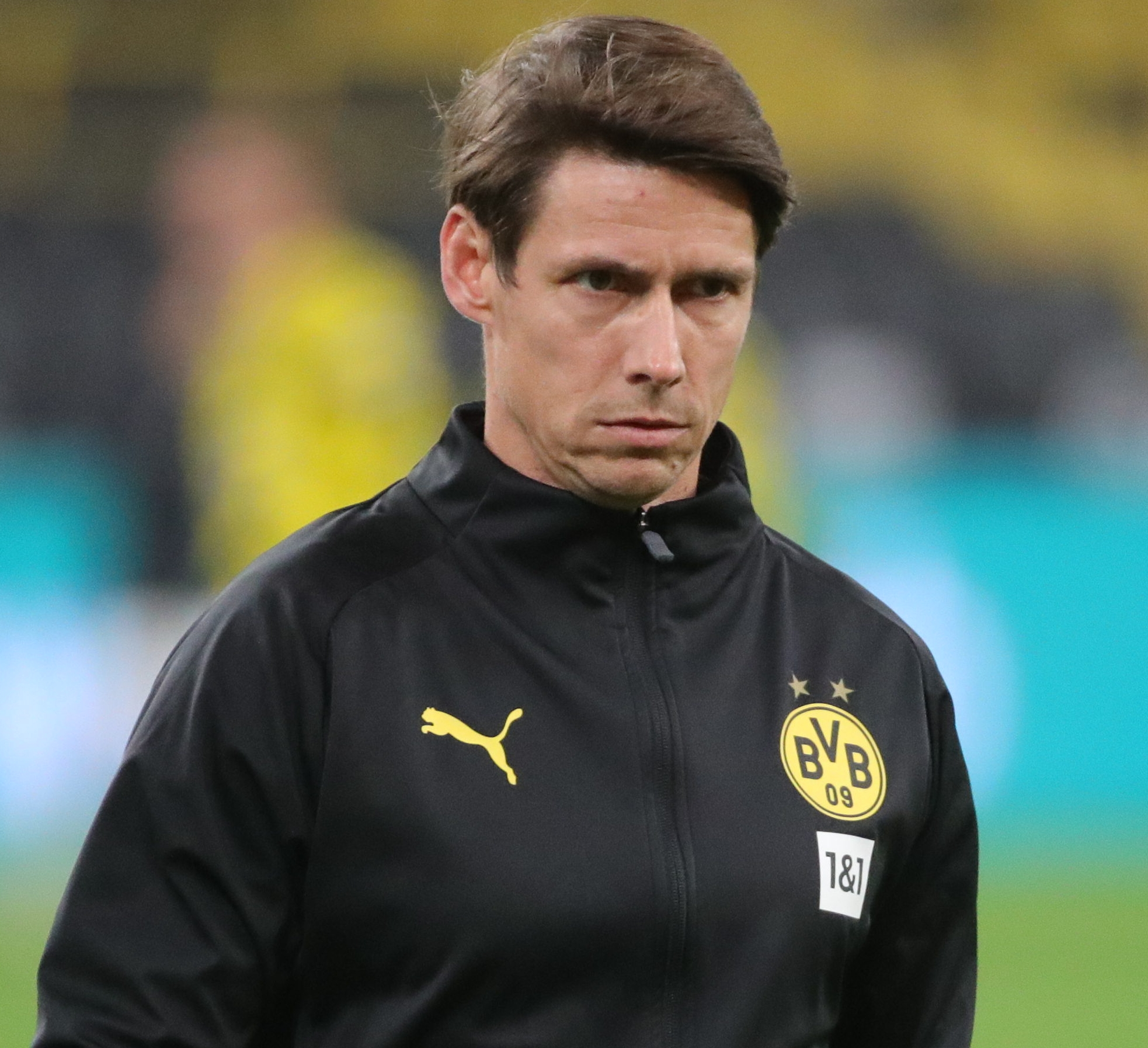
- Schüßler in 2022

Personal information
- Date of birth: 4 May 1981 (age 45)
- Place of birth: Magdeburg, East Germany
- Height: 1.76 m (5 ft 9 1/2 in)
- Position: Midfielder

Team information
- Current team: SV Hönnepel-Niedermörmter
- Number: 21

Youth career
- 1. FC Magdeburg

Senior career*
Years	Team	Apps	(Gls)
1999–2000	1. FC Magdeburg	14	(1)
2000–2002	Borussia Mönchengladbach	0	(0)
2003–2004	VfL Osnabrück (loan)	41	(8)
2004–2008	SC Paderborn 07	119	(12)
2008–2009	Rot-Weiß Oberhausen	10	(0)
2010–2011	Holstein Kiel		
2012–2013	SSVg Velbert		
2013–	SV Hönnepel-Niedermörmter		
- * Club domestic league appearances and goals as of 13:55, 27 January 2009 (UTC)

Benjamin Schüßler (born 4 May 1981 in Magdeburg, East Germany) is a German footballer who plays for SV Hönnepel-Niedermörmter.

== Career ==
He made his debut on the professional league level in the 2. Bundesliga for VfL Osnabrück on 3 August 2003, when he started a game against LR Ahlen.
