= Hans Heibach =

German footballer

Personal information
- Date of birth: 1 December 1918
- Date of death: 6 March 1970 (aged 51)
- Position: Midfielder

Senior career*
Years	Team	Apps	(Gls)
- Fortuna Düsseldorf

International career
1938	Germany	1	(0)
- * Club domestic league appearances and goals

Hans Heibach (1 December 1918 – 6 March 1970) was a German international footballer. Heibach played for Fortuna Düsseldorf prior to his retirement.
