= Ernst Albrecht (footballer) =

German footballer

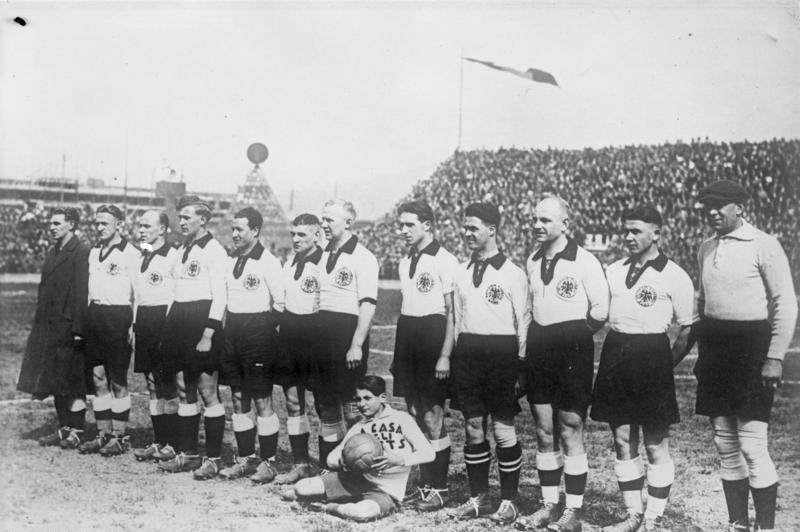
- Ernst Albrecht with Team Mates

Personal information
- Date of birth: 12 November 1907
- Place of birth: Düsseldorf, German Empire
- Date of death: 26 March 1976 (aged 68)
- Place of death: Düsseldorf, West Germany
- Position: Midfielder

Senior career*
Years	Team	Apps	(Gls)
1924–1944	Fortuna Düsseldorf	36	(7)

International career
1928–1934	Germany	17	(4)
Medal record
Men's football
Representing Germany
FIFA World Cup
Third place	1934 Italy
- * Club domestic league appearances and goals

Ernst Albrecht (12 November 1907 – 26 March 1976) was a German footballer. He was part of Germany's team for the 1928 Summer Olympics.

== Career ==
He played for Fortuna Düsseldorf in the team that won the 1933 German football championship.

Between 1928 and 1934, Albrecht appeared 17 times for the Germany national team, scoring four goals. Though he did not participate in the tournament, he was part of the German team which came third in the 1934 FIFA World Cup in Italy.

== International goals ==
#	Date	Venue	Opponent	Score	Result	Competition
1.	15 April 1928	Wankdorf Stadium, Bern, Switzerland	Switzerland	3–0	3–2	Friendly
2.	22 October 1933	Wedaustadion, Duisburg, Germany	Belgium	5–0	8–1	Friendly
3.	5 November 1933	Stadion am Königsweg, Magdeburg, Germany	Norway	1–0	2–2	Friendly
4.	11 March 1934	Josy Barthel Stadium, Luxembourg	Luxembourg	3–0	9–1	1934 FIFA World Cup qualification
