= Matthias Heidemann =

German footballer (1912–1970)

Personal information
- Date of birth: 7 February 1912
- Place of birth: Cologne, German Empire
- Date of death: 30 November 1970 (aged 58)
- Height: 1.73 m (5 ft 8 in)
- Position: Striker

Senior career*
Years	Team	Apps	(Gls)
1932–1934	Bonner FV		
1934–1941	Werder Bremen		

International career
1933–1935	Germany	3	
Medal record
Men's football
Representing Germany
FIFA World Cup
Third place	1934 Italy
- * Club domestic league appearances and goals

Matthias Heidemann (7 February 1912 – 30 November 1970) was a German footballer who played as a striker.

During his club career he played for Werder Bremen and Bonner FV. He earned three caps for the Germany national team between 1933 and 1935, and played in the 1934 FIFA World Cup where Germany finished third.
