= Willi Tiefel =

German footballer

Personal information
- Full name: Wilhelm Tiefel
- Date of birth: 14 July 1911
- Place of birth: Frankfurt, German Empire
- Date of death: 28 August 1941 (aged 30)
- Place of death: Narva, German-occupied Estonia
- Position: Midfielder

Senior career*
| Years | Team | Apps | (Gls) |
| 1920–1932 | Union Niederrad | | |
| 1932–1936 | Eintracht Frankfurt | 51 | (4) |
| 1936–1940 | Berliner SV 92 | | |
| 1940–1941 | BSC Brandenburg | | |

International career
| 1935–1936 | Germany | 7 | (0) |
- * Club domestic league appearances and goals

Wilhelm Tiefel (14 July 1911 – 28 August 1941), nicknamed Willi, was a German footballer.

He played for the teams Union Niederrad, Eintracht Frankfurt, Berliner SV 92 and BSC Brandenburg. He also played 7 times for Germany, starting in 1935.

== Personal life ==
Tiefel was born in Frankfurt on 14 July 1911. He fought in World War II as a private in the German army, and died of wounds on 28 August 1941 in Narva on the Eastern Front at the age of 30.
