= Jakob Bender =

German footballer

Personal information
- Date of birth: 23 March 1910
- Place of birth: Düsseldorf, German Empire
- Date of death: 8 February 1981 (aged 70)
- Position: Midfielder

Senior career*
Years	Team	Apps	(Gls)
1927–1939	Fortuna Düsseldorf	9	(0)

International career
1933–1935	Germany		
Medal record
Men's football
Representing Germany
FIFA World Cup
Third place	1934 Italy
- * Club domestic league appearances and goals

Jakob Bender (23 March 1910 – 8 February 1981) was a German footballer who played as a midfielder. In the 1930s, he was a squad member of Fortuna Düsseldorf, who in 1933 became German League champions.

Between 1933 and 1935, Bender played for the Germany national team. He was part of the squad selected for the 1934 FIFA World Cup.
