= Stanislaus Kobierski =

German footballer (1910–1972)

Personal information
- Full name: Stanislaus Kobierski
- Date of birth: 15 November 1910
- Place of birth: Düsseldorf, Germany
- Date of death: 18 November 1972 (aged 62)
- Position: Forward

Senior career*
Years	Team	Apps	(Gls)
1929–1930	TuRu Düsseldorf		
1930–1941	Fortuna Düsseldorf		
1941–1942	SG Ordnungspolizei Berlin		

International career
1931–1941	Germany	26	(9)
Medal record
Men's football
Representing Germany
FIFA World Cup
Third place	1934 Italy
- * Club domestic league appearances and goals

Stanislaus "Tau" Kobierski (15 November 1910 in Düsseldorf – 18 November 1972) was a German footballer.

Kobierski's parents were Poles who emigrated to Germany from Poznań. Between 1931 and 1941, he played 26 times and scored 9 goals for the Germany national football team. He participated in the 1934 FIFA World Cup, and scored Germany's first ever World Cup goal, in the first round 5–2 win over Belgium. His home team was Fortuna Düsseldorf.

In autumn 1941 he was delegated to the sports club of the SS and German police in occupied Warsaw. At the end of the Second World War, he became a Soviet prisoner of war. He had to do forced labour in a mine in the Arctic Circle. He was released from captivity in 1949 and was able to return to West Germany.
