= Sascha Rösler =

German footballer

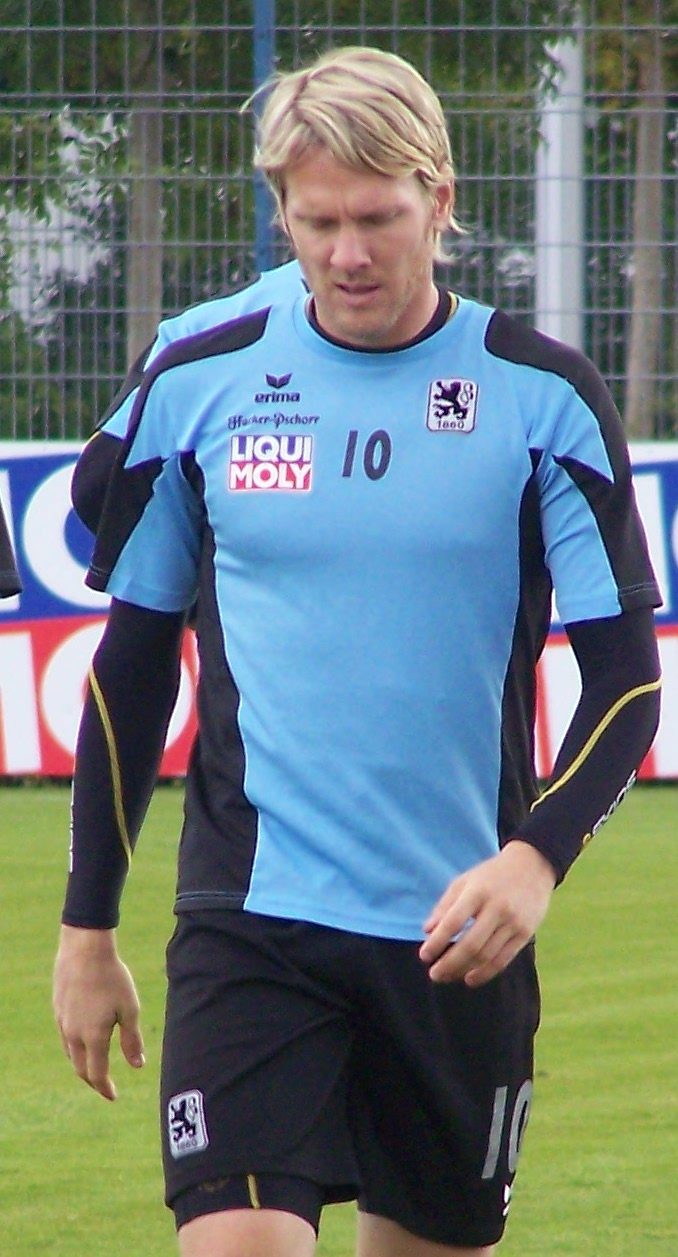

Personal information
- Full name: Sascha Rösler
- Date of birth: 28 October 1977 (age 49)
- Place of birth: Tettnang, West Germany
- Height: 1.85 m (6 ft 1 in)
- Position: Striker

Youth career
- 1982–1990: TSV Meckenbeuren
- 1990–1992: VfB Friedrichshafen
- 1992–1995: SSV Ulm 1846

Senior career*
Years	Team	Apps	(Gls)
1995–2001	SSV Ulm 1846	143	(24)
2001	TSV 1860 München	0	(0)
2001–2002	→ Rot-Weiß Oberhausen (loan)	21	(5)
2002–2005	SpVgg Greuther Fürth	74	(29)
2005–2007	Alemannia Aachen	62	(13)
2007–2008	Borussia Mönchengladbach	34	(9)
2009–2010	TSV 1860 München	38	(5)
2010–2012	Fortuna Düsseldorf	57	(19)
2012–2013	Alemannia Aachen	7	(1)
Total		436	(106)

International career
1997–1999	Germany U-21	8	(2)
2003	Germany Team 2006	1	(0)
- * Club domestic league appearances and goals

Sascha Rösler (born 28 October 1977) is a German retired footballer who played as a midfielder.

== Career ==
=== Youth ===
Born in Tettnang, Rösler first played football in 1982 for TSV Meckenbeuren. Via VfB Friedrichshafen, for which he played from 1990, he moved on to SSV Ulm 1846 in 1992.

=== SSV Ulm ===
In 1996, he was promoted to SSV Ulm's first team in the German Regionalliga Süd. Between 1996 and 1998, Rösler played 54 games and scored 13 goals. In 1998, the club was promoted to the second German League (2. Bundesliga). He scored three goals in 27 games and the club was promoted to the Bundesliga at the end of the season. In the first league season 1999–2000, Rösler played 26 times, he only played two entire 90-minute games and did not score a goal. Ulm was relegated that year. In the following season, Rösler played 29 times scoring eight goals in total. Ulm was relegated once more at the end of the season. In his three years as professional player with SSV Ulm, he also played five games in the DFB-Pokal, scoring one goal.

=== 1860 München und Rot-Weiß Oberhausen ===
In 2001, Rösler joined the Bundesliga club TSV 1860 München. He played for them once in the UI-Cup and had no further appearance in the following months. In November 2001, he was loaned second league club Rot-Weiß Oberhausen where he played 21 games and scored five goals.

=== Greuther Fürth ===
For the 2002–03 season, he moved to 2. Bundesliga club SpVgg Greuther Fürth. In his first season with Fürth, Rösler scored 13 goals in 32 games.

=== Borussia Mönchengladbach ===
On 4 November 2008, he was suspended and called up for the second team of Borussia Mönchengladbach. He was released by the club in December 2008.

=== TSV 1860 München ===
On 8 January 2009, he moved to TSV 1860 München.

=== Fortuna Düsseldorf ===
After the end of his contract in Munich on 30 June 2010, he signed up with Fortuna Düsseldorf in October 2010. Rösler helped the Fortuna to get back to the Bundesliga and announced he was planning to retire after spending two seasons in Düsseldorf.

=== Alemannia Aachen ===
On 30 May 2012, it was announced that Rösler would return to 3. Liga side Alemannia Aachen for the 2012–13 season. He retired at the end of the season after Alemannia was relegated.
