= Willi Wigold =

German footballer

Personal information
- Date of birth: 10 December 1909
- Place of birth: Düsseldorf, Germany
- Date of death: 28 November 1944 (aged 34)
- Position: Forward

Senior career*
Years	Team	Apps	(Gls)
- Fortuna Düsseldorf

International career
1932–1934	Germany	4	(3)
- * Club domestic league appearances and goals

Willi Wigold (10 December 1909 – 28 November 1944) was a German footballer who played as a forward for Fortuna Düsseldorf and the Germany national team. He joined Fortuna Düsseldorf in 1930 and was part of the team that won the 1933 German football championship. He played four matches for Germany between 1932 and 1934.

Wigold was a corporal in the German army in World War II and died at Lake Ilmen during the Russian campaign. The exact date of his death is disputed, with some sources listing 12 August 1943. The German war graves commission states he died in a military hospital on 28 November 1944 and was buried at Lodz Doly in Poland.
