= Fortuna Düsseldorf =

German association football club

- Full name: Düsseldorfer Turn- und Sportverein; Fortuna 1895 e.V.
- Nicknames: Flingeraner, Fortunen, F95
- Founded: 5 May 1895; 131 years ago
- Ground: Merkur Spiel-Arena
- Capacity: 54,600
- Board members: Chairman - Alexander Jobst; Sporting Director - Samir Arabi; CFO - Vacant
- Head coach: Jens Langeneke (interim)
- League: 3. Liga
- 2025–26: 2. Bundesliga, 17th of 18 (relegated)
- Website: f95.de
Home colours	Away colours	Third colours

Düsseldorfer Turn- und Sportverein Fortuna 1895 e.V., commonly known as Fortuna Düsseldorf (pronounced [fɔʁˈtuːna ˈdʏsl̩dɔʁf]) or Fortuna 95, is a German football club based in Düsseldorf, North Rhine-Westphalia that competes in the German 3. Liga.

Founded in 1895, Fortuna entered the league in 1913 and was a fixture in the top flight from the early 1920s up to the creation of the Bundesliga in 1963, where they competed in 25 seasons. Fortuna captured one German championship in 1933 and two German cup DFB-Pokal wins in 1979 and 1980. Their greatest feat in European competition was a Cup Winners Cup final in 1979 where they lost to Barcelona.

== History ==
=== Foundation to World War II ===
The earliest roots of the association go back to the establishment of the gymnastics club Turnverein Flingern on 5 May 1895 in the village of Flingern, today one of the eastern quarters of Düsseldorf. Two other sides figure in the club's early history: Düsseldorfer Fußballklub Spielverein, founded in 1908, and FK Alemania 1911, which was founded in 1911 and became Fortuna 1911 the following year. In mid-1912, these two clubs merged to form Düsseldorfer Fußball-Club Fortuna 1911, which played its debut season in the Westdeutschen Spielverband in 1913–14. TV Flingern joined Fortuna to create Düsseldorfer Turn- und Sportverein Fortuna on 15 November 1919.

In the late 1920s, Fortuna won its first honours as a first tier side; it captured a district level Bezirksliga title in 1927, sent its first representative to the Germany national team in 1928 (Ernst Albrecht), and took a second Bezirksliga title in 1929. The team continued to perform well into the 1930s, winning its third and fourth district titles en route to a Western German football championship in 1931 and its greatest success, a German football championship in 1933 against Schalke 04, which was on the verge of becoming the era's dominant side in Germany. Fortuna was the first team to win the title without conceding a goal in the final rounds of the tournament. It beat Vorwärts-Rasensport Gleiwitz (9–0), Arminia Hannover (3–0), Eintracht Frankfurt (4–0) and finally Schalke 04 (3–0) en route to becoming the first national champion from the industrial Rhine-Ruhr area.

In the following season, the club began playing in Gauliga Niederrhein, 1 of 16 top-flight divisions formed in the re-organization of German football under the Third Reich. Düsseldorf dominated the division through the 1930s as five-time champions between 1936 and 1940, and made losing appearances in the national championship final in 1936 (1–2 to 1. FC Nürnberg) and the final of the Tschammerpokal, the predecessor of today's DFB-Pokal, in 1937 (1–2 against Schalke 04). The club was relegated in 1942, but returned to the top flight the following season. In 1944–45, it began play as the combined wartime side Kriegsspielgemeinschaft TSV Fortuna/SC 99 Düsseldorf with partner Düsseldorfer Sport Club 1899, but took part in only two matches as Nazi Germany fell before the advance of Allied armies.

The most notable players of that era were Paul Janes, Germany's most capped player from 1942 to 1970 (71 caps), German team captain (1939–1942) and member of the Breslau Eleven that beat Denmark 8–0 in Breslau in 1937 and went on to win 10 of 11 games played during that year; Stanislaus Kobierski, who earned 26 caps and scored Germany's first ever FIFA World Cup goal; Ernst Albrecht; and Jakob Bender.

=== Post War era ===
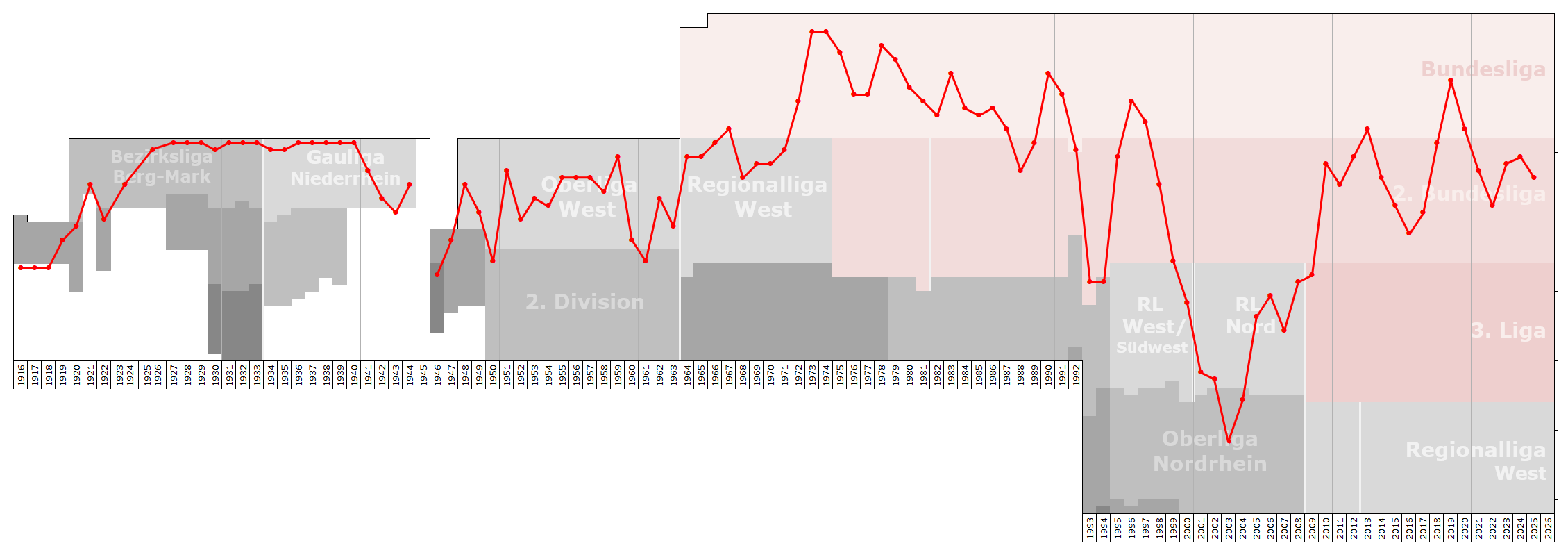
Historical chart of Fortuna league performance

After World War II, Allied occupation authorities ordered the dissolution of all sports organizations in Germany. Fortuna was re-formed in 1945 and then played most of their football in the Oberliga West (I) in the years between 1947 and the creation of the Bundesliga, West Germany's professional football league, in 1963. It played as a lower-to-mid-table side, though it also made three appearances in the DFB-Pokal final in – 1957, 1958 and 1962 – but did not win the prize, losing each of those matches to Bayern Munich, VfB Stuttgart and 1. FC Nürnberg. It was also during this era that Toni Turek, goalkeeper for West Germany's "Miracle of Bern" side at the 1954 World Cup; Erich Juskowiak (30 caps and World Cup player in 1958); and later national team coach Jupp Derwall all represented Fortuna.

=== 1960s and 1970s ===
Fortuna's performance was not good enough to earn them a place among the original 16 teams chosen for the newly founded Bundesliga in 1963, but the club played its way into the premier division three years later for a cameo appearance in 1966–67. Despite a sensational 2–1 away win at recent European Cup Winners' Cup winners Borussia Dortmund on its Bundesliga debut, Fortuna was immediately relegated, though only to return in 1971 for a stay that lasted 16 seasons and included two third-place league finishes (in 1972–73 and 1973–74).

On 9 December 1978, Fortuna recorded a 7–1 victory against Bayern Munich, to date the highest away defeat for Bayern in its entire Bundesliga history. In addition, Fortuna continued its prosperous play in the DFB-Pokal, making another three appearances. After losing in its fifth appearance in the final in 1978 against local rivals 1. FC Köln (0–2), the club finally broke through and came away as champions in 1979, prevailing 1–0 against Hertha BSC, then repeating as champions 1980 with 2–1 victory against 1. FC Köln. During this period, the club established a record for consecutive DFB-Pokal match victories, with 18-straight between 1978 and 1981.

Fortuna is among a group of four teams which have made frequent appearances in the DFB-Pokal final only to come away empty-handed. Like 1. FC Kaiserslautern, Fortuna has just two wins against five losses. 1. FC Köln has four wins and six losses in the Cup final, while Schalke 04 has been frustrated most often, with five wins and seven losses. Four of the Düsseldorfer's losses were by a single goal and two of those were in extra time.

The club's best turn in European competition was in the 1979 European Cup Winners' Cup Final, where it finished as runners-up to Barcelona, losing 4–3 in extra time in an exciting finale at Basel. It was the first of four occasions that the Catalan club won the tournament.

Fortuna achieved its success mostly with hometown players like the famous Allofs brothers (Klaus Allofs and Thomas Allofs) or players like Gerd Zewe (440 games in the Bundesliga), Dieter Herzog, Reiner Geye, Wolfgang Seel and Rudi Bommer who joined the team as nearly unknown players and ended as internationals. Between 1960 and 1967, Peter Meyer scored 119 goals in 174 games.

=== 1980s to the new century ===
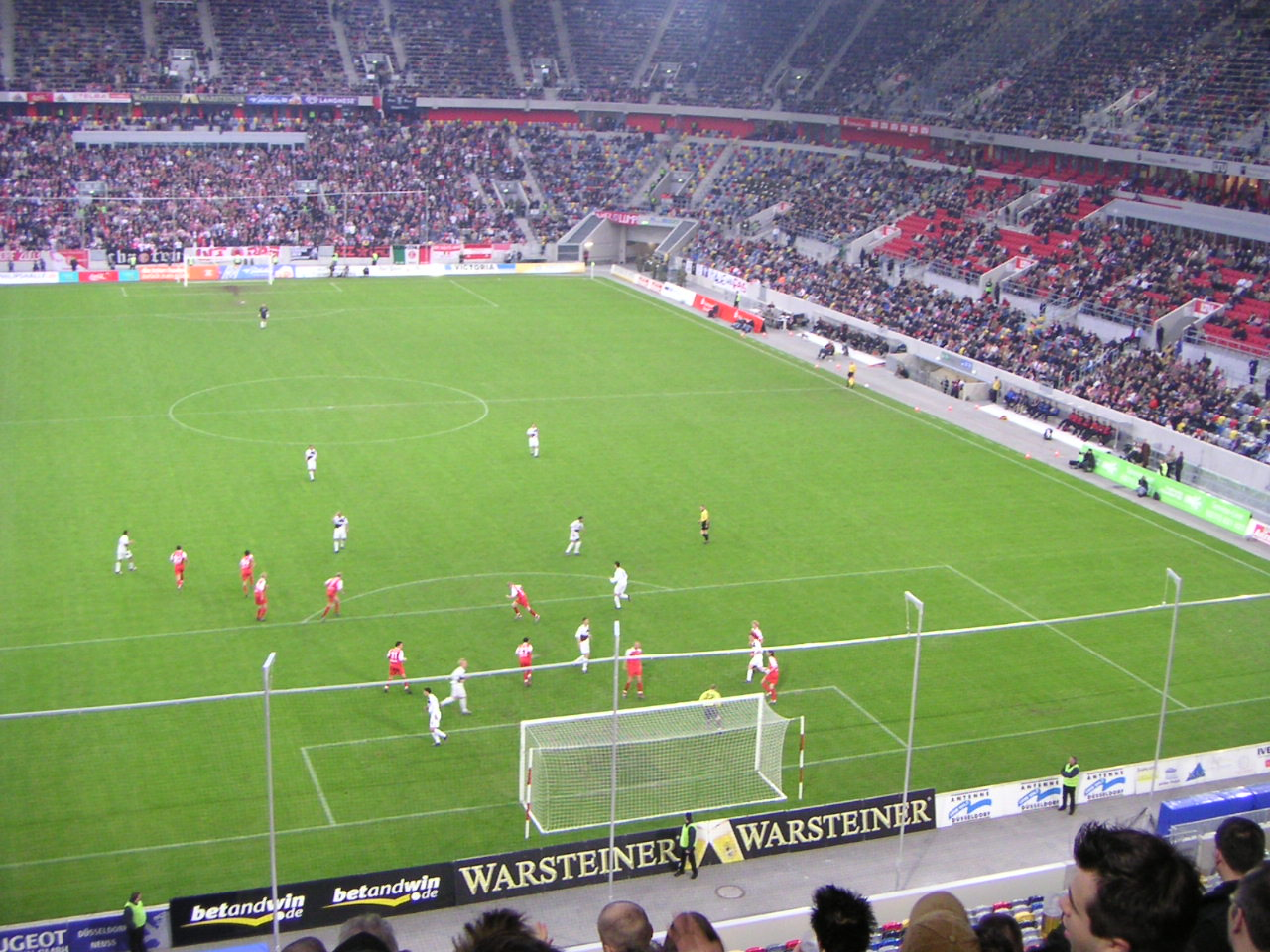
Esprit arena in Düsseldorf. View from the Warsteiner Tribüne. Match: Fortuna Düsseldorf vs. FC St. Pauli.

Since its relegation in 1987, Fortuna has bounced back and forth between leagues, spending five more seasons in the Bundesliga in 1989–1992 (after winning the 1988–89 2nd Bundesliga championship) and 1995–1997 and slipping as low as Oberliga Nordrhein (IV) in 2002–2004. In 2001, the club escaped relegation to tier IV only because two other clubs were denied licenses to play in tier III for financial reasons. Fortuna had its own money problems at the time but have since managed to arrange its finances more or less back into order. Between 2001 and 2003, the club was sponsored by German punk rock band Die Toten Hosen.

=== Recent seasons ===
In 2008–09, Fortuna competed in the newly established 3. Liga, finishing second and gaining automatic promotion to the 2. Bundesliga, where it finished fourth in its comeback season, 2009–10.

After a promising 2009–10 season, the 2010–11 season began poorly for Fortuna. After the first six games of the season, the club was in last place, having lost every match. During these first six matches, the club scored only two goals – one of which was an own-goal by the other side. Despite this discouraging start, Fortuna bounced back and finished the season in seventh place. 2011–12 began very differently: after the first half of the season, Fortuna was in first place in the table with a remarkable record of 12 wins, 5 draws and 0 losses. The "Herbstmeister" title gave the team and the fans hope that this could be the year Fortuna returned to the Bundesliga. The second half of the season was more challenging, as Fortuna was unable to maintain its pace: it suffered four losses and a number of draws, slipping to third place in the final standings. Nonetheless, this was sufficient for them to qualify for the two-game relegation playoff against the third-last place team in the Bundesliga – Hertha BSC. The first game of the relegation was played on 10 May 2012 in Berlin, with Fortuna winning 2–1. Fortuna drew the deciding game which was played on 15 May in Düsseldorf. Hertha fans, however, threw firecrackers at the field and the players, and one minute before the match ended, overexcited Fortuna fans stormed the field.

The promotion to the Bundesliga represented an extraordinary personal achievement for team captain Andreas Lambertz, as he became the first player in German football history to be promoted three times with the same club, from the then fourth-tier Oberliga to the Bundesliga. For striker Sascha Rösler, it marked the fourth time in his career that he was promoted from the Second Division into the Bundesliga.

Coming with the recent promotion, the club achieved a new record in German football history, becoming the only German club that has been relegated from the Bundesliga to a fourth-tier league (time period of downfall: 1997–2002) and promoted again to the Bundesliga afterwards (time period of ascent: 2004–2012).

Fortuna started the 2012–13 Bundesliga season strongly, ranking fifth after five games and concerns about relegation seemed to have been put to rest. However, Fortuna's 1–0 home win over Greuther Fürth on 16 February would prove to be the club's final victory of the season. The season concluded with Fortuna playing in Hannover 96, a match Fortuna lost 0–3. This defeat, combined with an Augsburg win over Greuther Fürth and a bizarre and unlikely victory by Hoffenheim over second-place Borussia Dortmund, resulted in Fortuna dropping two places. Fortuna finished 17th and were again relegated to the 2. Bundesliga.

Fortuna's relegation was the result not only of this unlikely series of occurrences on the final day of the season, but also a poor conclusion to the year. Of its final eight matches, it did not win a single one; just one win would have secured its position for the following season's Bundesliga. This poor performance contributed to the dismissal of head coach Norbert Meier.

Relegation to the 2. Bundesliga led to a period of generally disappointing performance. Fortuna spent the years between 2013 and 2017 in the middle of the table, often battling against relegation and rarely challenging for promotion back to the Bundesliga. During these years, the club went through a series of coaching changes, with Oliver Reck, Frank Kramer, and former player Mike Buskens among others leading the club at various points. Success however remained elusive.

In March 2016, Friedhelm Funkel – a native of Neuss – took over as coach of Fortuna Düsseldorf. In his first game as coach, Funkel led the club to a 4–3 win against 1. FC Kaiserslautern, ending a month-long winless streak.

At the start of the 2017–18 season, two of Fortuna's strongest performers from the previous year, goalkeeper Michael Rensing and forward Ihlas Bebou, were both lost from the club with Rensing suffering two broken ribs and Bebou transferring to Bundesliga side Hannover 96. A further setback was that Funkel's assistant Peter Hermann asked to be released from his contract with Fortuna in order to rejoin his mentor Jupp Heynckes upon his return to Bayern. With these three losses, it appeared that the 2017–18 season could be difficult for Fortuna. However, the club started extremely strongly: on the fourth day of the season, Fortuna had climbed to first place in the table, with a draw and three wins. For the remainder of the year, they would not drop below third place, benefitting from particularly strong play by Rensing's replacement in goal, Raphael Wolf, newly acquired Belgian forward Benito Raman, striker Rouwen Hennings, and midfielder Florian Neuhaus. A late-season slump saw Fortuna lose three games in succession in early April, but Fortuna won their next two matches, securing promotion to the Bundesliga. In the final game of the season, with promotion already secured, Fortuna defeated 1. FC Nürnberg 3–2 with a last-minute goal thereby securing first place and the 2. Bundesliga Championship, their second title after 1988–89.

Fortuna Düsseldorf's return to first-division football in 2018–19 was greeted with great enthusiasm by their supporters. The first half of the season was marked by inconsistent play. Fortuna played remarkably well against top Bundesliga sides, taking a point from Leipzig and defeating Hoffenheim and first-place Borussia Dortmund. Most encouraging was an away draw against the defending champions Bayern Munich, when Fortuna came back after trailing 2–0 and 3–1, to secure a 3–3 draw in the 93rd minute, with Dodi Lukebakio scored all three of Fortuna's goals. However, Fortuna failed to play well against clubs lower in the table, losing to Augsburg, Nürnberg and Mainz, and only managing a draw against Stuttgart. Fortuna Düsseldorf entered the mid-winter break in 14th place in the table, concluding the first half of the season with three successive wins against Freiburg, Dortmund and Hannover. Fortuna Düsseldorf enjoyed a better second half of the season, with away wins over Augsburg, Hertha Berlin and one of their best performances in recent times, in a 0–4 win at Schalke 04. A 4–1 win at home to Werder Bremen and a 3–1 victory over Borussia Mönchengladbach were highlights at home, whilst other home wins over VfB Stuttgart, Nürnberg and a final day defeat of Hannover 96 ensured a 10th-place finish in the Bundesliga. This achieved Fortuna Düsseldorf's highest league finish since the 1989–90 Bundesliga season, where they finished 9th.

== Sponsorship ==
For the 2017–18 season, online sports betting website Tipbet renewed its agreement as Premium Partners of Fortuna. The deal involves marketing campaigns to raise brand awareness, while regular promotions are organised.

== Players ==
=== Current squad ===
As of 3 September 2026

Note: Flags indicate national team as defined under FIFA eligibility rules; some limited exceptions apply. Players may hold more than one non-FIFA nationality.

No.	Pos.	Nation	Player
1	GK	GER	Lasse Rieß (on loan from Mainz 05)
2	DF	NED	Steven van der Sloot
3	DF	GER	Dominique Heintz
4	DF	GER	Lukas Bornschein (on loan from VfL Osnabrück)
5	MF	GER	Yassine Bouchama
6	MF	GER	Andreas Müller (on loan from Karlsruher SC)
7	DF	GER	Erik Wekesser
8	MF	NED	Jorrit Hendrix (captain)
9	FW	GER	Eric Hottmann
10	MF	GER	Philipp Förster
11	FW	GER	Lukas Eixler
14	MF	GER	Jomaine Consbruch
15	DF	GER	Tim Oberdorf
16	MF	GER	Marcel Benger
18	MF	LUX	Miguel Fernandes Gonçalves

No.	Pos.	Nation	Player
20	DF	GER	Felix Meiser
22	GK	GER	Louis Lord
23	FW	ERI	Filimon Gerezgiher
24	FW	GER	Fabian Schleusener
25	DF	GER	Matthias Zimmermann
27	FW	CUW	Jordi Paulina
28	DF	GER	Sascha Risch
29	FW	GER	Kilian Sauck
34	MF	MAR	Anas Slimani
38	MF	GER	Elias Arden
39	DF	GER	Kaden Amaniampong
40	MF	MAR	Hamza Anhari
41	GK	HUN	Milán Czakó
43	DF	GER	Noah Egouli
44	DF	GER	Elias Egouli

=== Out on loan ===
Note: Flags indicate national team as defined under FIFA eligibility rules; some limited exceptions apply. Players may hold more than one non-FIFA nationality.

No.	Pos.	Nation	Player
—	DF	GER	Levi Mentzel (at TSV Steinbach Haiger until 30 June 2027)
—	FW	GER	Mechak Quiala Tito (at Rot-Weiß Erfurt until 30 June 2027)

=== Reserve team – Fortuna Düsseldorf II ===
As of 30 August 2026

Note: Flags indicate national team as defined under FIFA eligibility rules; some limited exceptions apply. Players may hold more than one non-FIFA nationality.

No.	Pos.	Nation	Player
1	GK	GER	Linus Langenbruch
2	DF	GER	Moritz Montag
3	DF	GER	Darin Quiala Tito
4	DF	GER	Aidan Chikeme
5	DF	GER	Kaspar Harbering
7	MF	GER	Noah Nikolaou
8	MF	UKR	Andriy Honcharenko
9	FW	MAR	Mohammed Berrahou
10	FW	GER	Conor Tönnies
11	DF	GER	Leo Mirgartz

No.	Pos.	Nation	Player
14	DF	TUR	Berkant Gedikli
17	MF	GER	Giovanni Nkowa
18	DF	GER	Ben Eze
20	MF	CRO	Adrijan Peša
21	MF	UKR	Maksym Len
22	GK	GER	Florian Dimmer
23	MF	GER	Tobias Peitz
24	MF	GER	Simon Vu (captain)
27	FW	GER	Dadou Mossi-Sezene
35	FW	CUW	Charlison Benschop

== Honours ==
The club's honours are as follows:

=== Domestic ===
- German championship: 1933
  - Runners-up: 1936
- 2. Bundesliga (II): 1988–89, 2017–18
- Regionalliga West (II): 1965–66
- Oberliga Nordrhein (III): 1993–94

=== Cup ===
- DFB-Pokal: 1978–79, 1979–80
  - Runners-up: 1936–37, 1956–57, 1957–58, 1961–62, 1977–78

=== International ===
- European Cup Winners' Cup
  - Runners-up: 1978–79
- Intertoto Cup: 1967, 1984, 1986
- Trophy Ciudad de Palma: 1989

=== Regional ===
- Western German championship (I): 1930–31
- Gauliga Niederrhein/Berg-Mark (I): 1926–27, 1927–28, 1928–29, 1930–31, 1931–32, 1932–33, 1935–36, 1936–37, 1937–38, 1938–39, 1939–40, 1946–47
- Western German Cup (I–II): 1955–56, 1956–57, 1957–58, 1961–62, 1970–71 (II)

=== Reserve team ===
- German amateur football championship (III): 1976–77

== League history ==
- 1913–1914 C-Klasse (3rd tier) – Champions: 1914
- 1914–1918 B-Klasse (2nd tier) – Champions: 1915, 1916, 1917, 1918
- 1918–1919 A-Klasse (1st tier)
- 1919–1920 A-Klasse (2nd tier) – Champions: 1920
- 1920–1921 Gauliga Berg Mark (1st tier)
- 1921–1922 A-Klasse (2nd tier)
- 1922–1933 Gauliga Berg Mark (1st tier) – Champions: 1927, 1928, 1929, 1931, 1932, 1933
- 1933–1942 Gauliga Niederrhein (1st tier) – Champions: 1936, 1937, 1938, 1939, 1940
- 1942–1943 Bezirksklasse (2nd tier) – Champions: 1943
- 1943–1944 Gauliga Niederrhein (1st tier)
- 1944–1946 no contests (WW II)
- 1946–1947 Bezirksliga Berg Mark (1st tier) – Champions: 1947
- 1947–1949 Oberliga West (1st tier)
- 1949–1950 2. Liga West (2nd tier)
- 1950–1960 Oberliga West (1st tier)
- 1960–1961 2. Liga West (2nd tier)
- 1961–1963 Oberliga West (1st tier)
- 1963–1966 Regionalliga West (2nd tier) – Champions: 1966
- 1966–1967 Bundesliga (1st tier)
- 1967–1971 Regionalliga West (2nd tier)
- 1971–1987 Bundesliga (1st tier)
- 1987–1989 2. Bundesliga (2nd tier) – Champions: 1989
- 1989–1992 Bundesliga (1st tier)
- 1992–1993 2. Bundesliga (2nd tier)
- 1993–1994 Oberliga Nordrhein (3rd tier) – Champions: 1994
- 1994–1995 2. Bundesliga (2nd tier)
- 1995–1997 Bundesliga (1st tier)
- 1997–1999 2. Bundesliga (2nd tier)
- 1999–2000 Regionalliga West/Südwest (3rd tier)
- 2000–2002 Regionalliga Nord (3rd tier)
- 2002–2004 Oberliga Nordrhein (4th tier)
- 2004–2008 Regionalliga Nord (3rd tier)
- 2008–2009 3. Liga (3rd tier)
- 2009–2012 2. Bundesliga (2nd tier)
- 2012–2013 Bundesliga (1st tier)
- 2013–2018 2. Bundesliga (2nd tier) – Champions: 2018
- 2018–2020 Bundesliga (1st tier)
- 2020–2026 2. Bundesliga (2nd tier)
- 2026–present 3. Liga (3rd tier)

=== Recent seasons ===
The last five seasons are shown.

Season	League	Tier	Position	DFB-Pokal	Av. Home Attendance	Top Scorer(s)
2021–22	2. Bundesliga	2	10th	Round 2	17,526	(Germany) Rouwen Hennings (13)
2022–23	2. Bundesliga	2	4th	Round of 16	29,420	(Poland) Dawid Kownacki (14)
2023–24	2. Bundesliga	2	3rd	Semifinals	39,672	(Greece) Christos Tzolis (22)
2024–25	2. Bundesliga	2	6th	Round 1	41,431	(Poland) Dawid Kownacki (13)
2025–26	2. Bundesliga	2	17th	Round 2	42,210	(Switzerland) Cedric Itten (15)

== Notable players ==
=== Internationals for the Germany national team ===
Twenty-five Fortuna players have made appearances with the national side earning 240 caps between them. With the exception of Erich Juskowiak, all players debuted as Fortuna players:

- Ernst Albrecht (1928–1934) 17 caps
- Klaus Allofs (1978–1981) 21 caps (56 caps overall)
- Jakob Bender (1933–1935) 9 caps
- Manfred Bockenfeld (1984) 1 cap
- Rudi Bommer (1984) 6 caps
- Kurt Borkenhagen (1952) 1 cap
- Theo Breuer (1933) 2 caps
- Jupp Derwall (1954) 2 caps
- Reiner Geye (1972–1974) 4 caps
- Hans Heibach (1938) 1 cap
- Dieter Herzog (1974) 5 caps
- Günter Jäger (1958) 1 cap
- Paul Janes (1932–1942) 71 caps
- Erich Juskowiak (1953–1959) 30 caps (31 caps overall)
- Stanislaus Kobierski (1931–1941) 26 caps
- Kurt Krüger (1940) 1 cap
- Matthias Mauritz (1959) 1 cap
- Paul Mehl (1936) 2 caps
- Hans Neuschäfer (1956) 1 cap
- Wolfgang Seel (1974–1977) 6 caps
- Bernhard Steffen (1958–1960) 2 caps
- Anton Turek (1950–1954) 20 caps
- Willi Wigold (1932–1934) 4 caps
- Gerd Zewe (1978–79) 4 caps
- Felix Zwolanowski (1940) 2 caps

== Coaching staff ==
Position	Name
Head coach	(Germany) Jens Langeneke
Assistant coach	(Bulgaria) Ilia Gruev
Goalkeeper coach	(Germany) Christoph Semmler
Mental coach	(Germany) Axel Zehle
Athletic coach	(Germany) Andreas Gross (Germany) Engin Cicem
Video analyst	(Germany) Benjamin Fischer (Germany) Jonas Bergerhoff
Head of licensed players department	(Germany) Sascha Rösler
Equipment manager	(Germany) Oliver Paashaus (Germany) Tom Wirtz
Team doctor	(Germany) Dr. Ulf Blecker
Team radiologist	(Germany) Dr. Ioannis Anastasiou
Team cardiologist	(Germany) Dr. Michael Berr
Team neurologist	(Germany) Dr. Rafael Löbbert
Physiotherapist	(Germany) Mathias Eckl (Germany) Fais Al Mami (Germany) Jonathan Hoppe

== Coaches ==
- (Germany) Kuno Klötzer (July 1963 – June 1967)
- (Germany) Otto Knefler (July 1968 – June 1970)
- (Germany) Heinz Lucas (July 1970 – April 1975)
- (Germany) Manfred Krafft (April 1975 – April 1976)
- (Germany) Sepp Piontek (July 1975 – April 1976)
- (Germany) Dietrich Weise (July 1976 – June 1978)
- (Germany) Hans-Dieter Tippenhauer (July 1978 – October 1979)
- (Germany) Otto Rehhagel (October 1979 – December 1980)
- (Germany) Heinz Höher (December 1980 – June 1981)
- (Germany) Jörg Berger (July 1981 – October 1982)
- (Germany) Willibert Kremer (October 1982 – April 1985)
- (Germany) Dieter Brei (April 1985 – April 1987)
- (Germany) Gerd Meyer (April 1987 – June 1987)
- (Bosnia and Herzegovina) Aleksandar Ristić (July 1987 – December 1990)
- (Austria) Josef Hickersberger (December 1990 – August 1991)
- (Germany) Rolf Schafstall (August 1991 – January 1992)
- (Germany) Hans-Jürgen Gede (January 1992 – March 1992)
- (Germany) Horst Köppel (January 1992 – August 1992)
- (Poland) Rudolf Wojtowicz (interim) (August 1992)
- (Bosnia and Herzegovina) Aleksandar Ristić (August 1992 – November 1996)
- (Poland) Rudolf Wojtowicz (November 1996 – September 1997)
- (Germany) Uli Maslo (September 1997 – April 1998)
- (Bosnia and Herzegovina) Enver Marić (interim) (April 1998 – June 1998)
- (Germany) Klaus Allofs (July 1998 – April 1999)
- (Germany) Peter Neururer (April 1999 – June 1999)
- (Germany) Jürgen Gelsdorf (July 1999 – May 2000)
- (Romania) Tim Kamp (interim) (May 2000 – June 2000)
- (Bosnia and Herzegovina) Aleksandar Ristić (July 2000 – January 2001)
- (Germany) Uwe Fuchs (January –April 2001)
- (Romania) Tim Kamp (April 2001 – April 2002)
- (Germany) Stefan Emmerling (April –June 2002)
- (Serbia) Slavko Petrović (July 2002 – May 2003)
- (Germany) Uwe Weidemann (May –June 2003)
- (Italy) Massimo Morales (July 2003 – November 2004)
- (Germany) Uwe Weidemann (November 2004 – November 2007)
- (Germany) Wolf Werner (interim) (November –December 2007)
- (Germany) Norbert Meier (January 2008 – June 2013)
- (Germany) Mike Büskens (June – November 2013)
- (Germany) Oliver Reck (interim) (November and December 2013)
- (Germany) Lorenz-Günther Köstner (January 2014 – June 2014)
- (Germany) Oliver Reck (June 2014 – February 2015)
- (Turkey) Taşkın Aksoy (interim) (April 2015 – June 2015)
- (Germany) Frank Kramer (July 2015 – November 2015)
- (Germany) Peter Hermann (interim) (November 2015 – December 2015)
- (Germany) Marco Kurz (December 2015 – March 2016)
- (Germany) Friedhelm Funkel (March 2016 – January 2020)
- (Germany) Uwe Rösler (January 2020 – June 2021)
- (Germany) Christian Preußer (July 2021 – February 2022)
- (Germany) Daniel Thioune (February 2022 – October 2025)
- (Germany) Markus Anfang (October 2025 – April 2026)
- (Germany) Alexander Ende (April 2026 – October 2026)
- (Germany) Jens Langeneke (interim) (October 2026 – present)

== Stadiums ==
- Lichtplatz (1908–19)
- Vennhauser Straße (1919–30)
- Paul-Janes-Stadion (1930–53, 1970–72, 1975–76 (Evasive), 2002–05, 2005–07 (Evasive))
- Rheinstadion (1953–70, 1972–2002)
- LTU Arena/Esprit Arena/Merkur Spiel-Arena (since 2005)
- Lena-Arena (April–May 2011)

== Records and firsts ==
- 1928: first German team to visit Africa for friendly competition
- 1960: first German team to sign an African player (Charles Gyamfi)
- 1978 – 7 Dec.: Fortuna obtained a 7–1 victory against Bayern Munich, to date the worst away defeat for Bayern in its entire Bundesliga history.
- 1978–1981: consecutive DFB-Pokal match victories (18)
- 2009: Fortuna set an all-time attendance record for third-level football in Germany: 50,095 visitors saw a 1–0 victory against Werder Bremen U23 that meant promotion into the 2. Bundesliga.

== Rivalries and fan culture ==
Fortuna's fiercest rivalry is with 1. FC Köln, which stems from the geographic proximity of Düsseldorf and Cologne as well as the historic rivalry between the two cities. However, in recent seasons, the clubs have rarely played in the same division, meaning that head-to-head encounters have become rarer. The 2013–14 season marked the last time the two clubs met in competitive matches when both played in the Second Division. For the 2018–19 season, Fortuna was promoted to the 1. Bundesliga precisely as 1. FC Köln was demoted from the Bundesliga to the Second Division, again avoiding the "Rheinland Derby".

Fortuna's other historic rivals are Rot-Weiss Essen, Bayer 04 Leverkusen, and Wuppertaler SV. During the 1970s, all four clubs played in the Bundesliga. Both Essen and Wuppertal have since dropped to lower leagues. Bayer Leverkusen, on the other hand, has emerged as a powerful force in the Bundesliga. Leverkusen's financial support from the Bayer chemical conglomerate has led to many Düsseldorf fans criticizing the club as "plastic" and inauthentic, without any real tradition. During the seasons when they both played in the Second Division, Fortuna's matches against MSV Duisburg and Borussia Mönchengladbach were hotly contested and were often referred to as "Lower Rhein Derbys". Fortuna Düsseldorf and Rot-Weiss Essen have played one another 59 times, and many fans still regard this as a heated rivalry, but direct matches have been rare in recent years. Fortuna also has inter-city rivalries with Düsseldorf SC99 and TuRU Düsseldorf, yet these have also lost their intensity. During the post-war years, no other club within the Düsseldorf city limits has ever played in a higher division than Fortuna.

Because of the dominance of FC Bayern München in recent decades, Fortuna also has a competitive rivalry with the Bavarians. Although Düsseldorf has not mounted a serious challenge for the Bundesliga championship since the early 1970s, matches between Fortuna and FC Bayern have been fiercely contested. In a 1975 match, Bayern led at halftime 4–2, but Fortuna came back to win 6–5. On 9 December 1978, Fortuna defeated FC Bayern 7–1, an outcome which, to this day, remains FC Bayern's worst-ever away loss. During the 1985–86 season, Fortuna was the only team to win both of its games against the eventual champions from Munich, winning 4–0 and 3–2. The band Die Toten Hosen, many of whose members are enthusiastic fans of Fortuna Düsseldorf, have celebrated the team's success against FC Bayern in their song "Bayern", which appears on their album Immortal. The last Bundesliga game was a draw after Munich had led 3–1. Fortuna scored two goals to make it 3–3 in the last 10 minutes.

The club has a particularly strong affiliation with English Championship side Ipswich Town, with their supporters making annual visits to see them at their home ground, Portman Road, since 2006. Ipswich fans have also done the same, with some coming to cheer Düsseldorf on at the Merkur Spiel-Arena.

The club also has a dedicated ultra fanbase that is known for their choreographed presentations, or what's called a "tifo." The ultras include social activism for perceived injustices, which sets their identity apart from other fanbases.

Members of the band Die Toten Hosen, including lead singer Campino, are often present at Fortuna matches at home and on the road, and when Fortuna celebrated its recent 2. Division championship in front of thousands of fans at Düsseldorf's city hall on 14 May 2018, the band appeared with them. The band is also highly regarded by the club for serving as sponsors during the 2001–02 and 2002–03 seasons, when the club had been relegated to the Regional League and faced financial difficulty.

== Futsal ==
Since 1 June 2015, Fortuna Düsseldorf has its futsal department. Since then, the Futsal department has developed into one of the strongest in Germany. They took part in the Deutsche Futsal Meisterschaft 2021 of the DFB as the winner of the Futsalliga West in the 2020–21 season and is one of the founding members of the Futsal Bundesliga.
