= Felix Zwolanowski =

German footballer

Personal information
- Date of birth: 12 July 1912
- Date of death: 26 November 1998 (aged 86)
- Position: Forward

Senior career*
Years	Team	Apps	(Gls)
- Fortuna Düsseldorf

International career
1940	Germany	2	(0)
- * Club domestic league appearances and goals

Felix Zwolanowski (12 July 1912 – 26 November 1998) was a German international footballer.
