= Paul Mehl =

German footballer

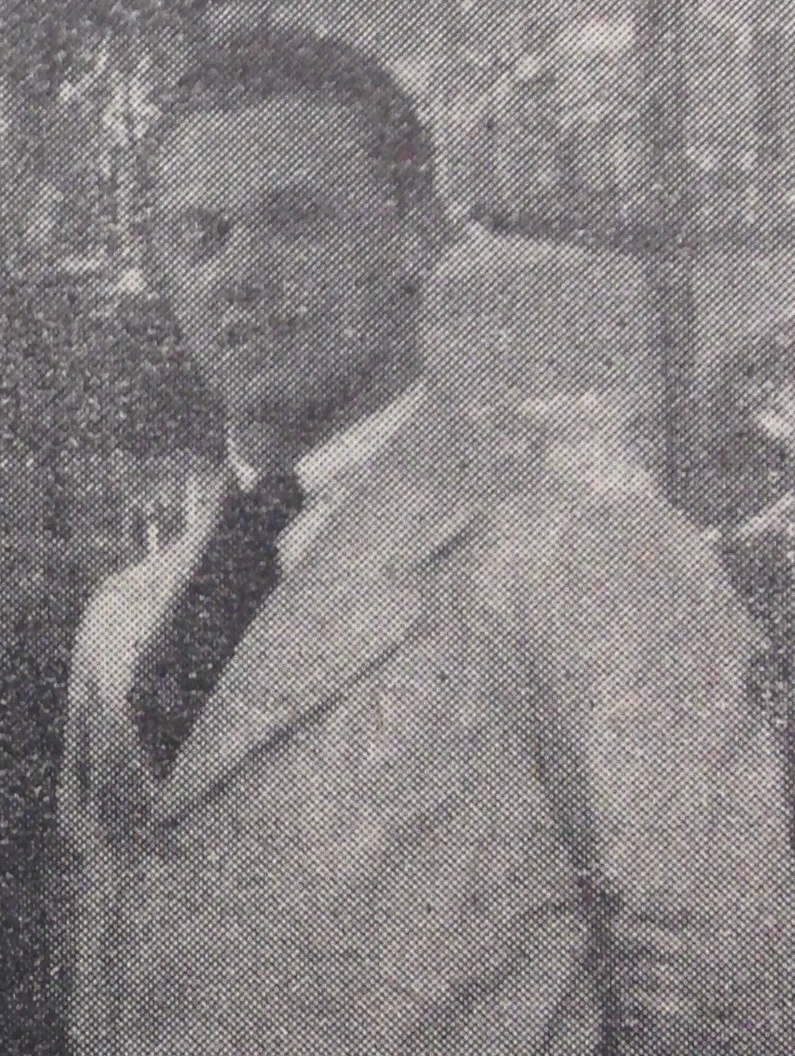

Personal information
- Full name: Peter Paul Mehl
- Date of birth: 21 April 1912
- Date of death: 6 May 1972 (aged 60)
- Position: Midfielder

Senior career*
Years	Team	Apps	(Gls)
- Fortuna Düsseldorf

International career
1936	Germany	2	(0)
- * Club domestic league appearances and goals

Peter Paul Mehl (21 April 1912 – 6 May 1972) was a German international footballer. He was part of Germany's squad at the 1936 Summer Olympics.
