= 2019–20 Arminia Bielefeld season =

Arminia Bielefeld
2019–20 season
- President: Hans-Jürgen Laufer
- Head coach: Uwe Neuhaus
- Stadium: Bielefelder Alm
- 2. Bundesliga: 1st
- DFB-Pokal: Second round
- Top goalscorer: League: Fabian Klos (21); All: Fabian Klos (22)
- Highest home attendance: 26,515 vs Hamburger SV, 2. Bundesliga, 21 October 2019
- Lowest home attendance: 15,021 vs Erzgebirge Aue, 2. Bundesliga, 17 August 2019
Home colours	Away colours

The 2019–20 Arminia Bielefeld season was the 115th season in the football club's history. The season covers a period from 1 July 2019 to 28 June 2020. On 16 June, the club was promoted to the 2020–21 Bundesliga, returning to Germany's top tier for the first time since 2008–09.

== Background ==
The 2018–19 season was Arminia's 4th consecutive season in the 2. Bundesliga, following promotion from the 3. Liga in the 2014–15 season. On 10 December 2018, manager Jeff Saibene was sacked with the club 14th in the 2. Bundesliga. Bielefeld appointed Uwe Neuhaus as their new head coach. He led them to a 7th-placed finish on 49 points.

== Season summary ==
Bielefeld began the season with a 1–1 draw at St. Pauli, thanks to a 90th minute Manuel Prietl header rescuing a point for Bielefeld. They also drew their second game, a 3–3 draw at home to VfL Bochum, before recording their first win of the season with a 3–1 victory at home to Erzgebirge Aue. Bielefeld picked up 10 points from their next 4 league games before, their unbeaten run was broken with a 1–0 defeat at home to VfB Stuttgart, with a 91st minute Hamadi Al Ghaddioui strike consigning Arminia Bielefeld to their first league defeat of the season. However, Bielefeld bounced back from this defeat with a 1–0 away victory at VfL Osnabrück. Following a draw at home to Hamburger SV, They won their next three league games against Dynamo Dresden, Holstein Kiel and 1. FC Nürnberg to move to the top of the 2. Bundesliga. Though a 1–1 draw at home to SV Sandhausen meant Hamburger SV returned to the top of the table, Bielefeld returned to the top of the league with two goals from Fabian Klos and one from Andreas Voglsammer securing a 3–1 win at SV Darmstadt 98. Arminia Bielefeld entered the winter break top of the 2. Bundesliga on 34 points. During the January transfer window, Bielefeld signed goalkeeper Oscar Linnér from AIK Fotboll and young forward Sebastian Müller from 1. FC Köln, whilst no players left the club.

Following the winter break, Bielefeld beat VfL Bochum 2–0 at home on 28 January 2020, before drawing 0–0 at Erzgebirge Aue on 31 January 2020. Bielefeld scored 10 goals in their following two games, recording a 6–0 win at home to Jahn Regensburg with six different goalscorers, followed by a 4–2 victory away at Greuther Fürth. Bielefeld's next two matches were both 1–0 home victories, first against Hannover 96 and then against Wehen Wiesbaden. Despite going 1–0 down to 2nd placed VfB Stuttgart, a left-footed goal from Cebio Soukou in the 76th minute ensured Bielefeld retain their 6-point league at the top of the 2. Bundesliga. However, the 2. Bundesliga season was postponed later in March due to fears over the COVID-19 pandemic, leaving Bielefeld's chances of promotion in doubt.

After two months without football, it was announced on 7 May 2020 that German football could resume behind closed doors from 16 May 2020, meaning Bielefeld's promotion prospects were strong. Bielefeld returned to action on 17 May 2020, and took the lead against VfL Osnabrück through a 17th minute Fabian Klos penalty before conceding a 94th-minute equaliser, though still extended their lead over second place to 7 points. Bielefeld's form was inconsistent, with the club winning one and drawing three of their following four matches. A 4–0 win at home to Dynamo Dresden on 15 June 2020 meant that Bielefeld would secure promotion to the Bundesliga if either Hamburger SV or VfB Stuttgart failed to win in their matches on 16 and 17 June respectively. On 16 June 2020, Bielefeld's promotion to the 2020–21 Bundesliga was secured after second-placed Hamburger SV drew 1–1 at home to VfL Osnabrück, rendering it impossible for Bielefeld to finish below second place. Two days later, on 18 June 2020, Bielefeld won the 2. Bundesliga title following a 1–0 win over SV Darmstadt 98. Their final two matches saw a 3–3 draw away at Karlsruher SC followed by a 3–0 victory at home to 1. FC Heidenheim.

== First-team squad ==
As of 31 January 2020

Note: Flags indicate national team as defined under FIFA eligibility rules; some limited exceptions apply. Players may hold more than one non-FIFA nationality.

No.	Pos.	Nation	Player
1	GK	GER	Stefan Ortega Moreno
2	DF	GER	Amos Pieper
3	DF	GER	Brian Behrendt
4	DF	SWE	Joakim Nilsson
6	MF	GER	Tom Schütz
7	MF	GER	Patrick Weihrauch
8	DF	GER	Florian Hartherz
9	FW	GER	Fabian Klos
10	MF	GER	Reinhold Yabo
11	DF	GER	Stephan Salger
13	FW	GER	Sebastian Müller
14	MF	FRO	Jóan Símun Edmundsson
16	MF	GER	Fabian Kunze
18	FW	GER	Nils Quaschner
19	MF	AUT	Manuel Prietl

No.	Pos.	Nation	Player
20	MF	GER	Nils Seufert
21	FW	GER	Andreas Voglsammer
23	DF	GER	Anderson Lucoqui
24	DF	ESP	Alejandro Pérez Navarro
25	DF	FRA	Jonathan Clauss
27	DF	SUI	Cédric Brunner
29	MF	BEN	Cebio Soukou
30	MF	GER	Marcel Hartel
31	GK	HUN	Ágoston Kiss
32	MF	GER	Keanu Staude
34	GK	SWE	Oscar Linnér
36	FW	GER	Sven Schipplock
38	MF	GER	Jomaine Consbruch
40	GK	GER	Philipp Klewin

== Transfers ==
=== Transfers in ===
Date	Position	Player	From	Type	Ref.
1 July 2019	MF	(Benin) Cebio Soukou	Hansa Rostock	Transfer	
1 July 2019	MF	(Germany) Fabian Kunze	SV Rödinghausen	Transfer	
5 July 2019	GK	(Hungary) Ágoston Kiss	Haladás Szombathely	Loan	
11 July 2019	DF	(Sweden) Joakim Nilsson	IF Elfsborg	Transfer	
27 July 2019	MF	(Germany) Marcel Hartel	Union Berlin	Transfer	
31 August 2019	DF	(Spain) Alejandro Pérez Navarro	Sporting Gijón	Transfer	
7 January 2020	GK	(Sweden) Oscar Linnér	AIK	Transfer	
9 January 2020	FW	(Germany) Sebastian Müller	1. FC Köln	Transfer	

=== Transfers out ===
Date	Position	Player	To	Type	Ref.
20 May 2019	FW	(Germany) Christopher Nöthe	N/A	Released	
30 June 2019	MF	(Sweden) Sören Brandy	N/A	Retired	
30 June 2019	MF	(Germany) Can Özkan	Alemannia Aachen	Loan	
8 July 2019	GK	(Germany) Nikolai Rehnen	Alemannia Aachen	Loan	
10 July 2019	DF	(Germany) Julian Börner	Sheffield Wednesday	Transfer	
21 July 2019	GK	(The Gambia) Baboucarr Gaye	SG Wattenscheid 09	Transfer	
24 July 2019	MF	(Germany) Cerruti Siya	FC Differdange 03	Transfer	
26 July 2019	MF	(Germany) Max Christiansen	SV Waldhof Mannheim	Transfer	
6 August 2019	MF	(Turkey) Semir Ucar	Adanaspor	Transfer	
31 August 2019	FW	(Germany) Prince Osei Owusu	TSV 1860 Munich	Loan	

== Competitions ==
=== 2. Bundesliga ===
==== League table ====
Pos	Team	Pld	W	D	L	GF	GA	GD	Pts	Promotion, qualification or relegation
1	Arminia Bielefeld (C, P)	34	18	14	2	65	30	+35	68	Promotion to Bundesliga
2	VfB Stuttgart (P)	34	17	7	10	62	41	+21	58	Promotion to Bundesliga
3	1. FC Heidenheim	34	15	10	9	45	36	+9	55	Qualification for promotion play-offs
4	Hamburger SV	34	14	12	8	62	46	+16	54	
5	Darmstadt 98	34	13	13	8	48	43	+5	52	

Source: DFB
Rules for classification: 1) Points; 2) Goal difference; 3) Goals scored; 4) Head-to-head points; 5) Head-to-head goal difference; 6) Head-to-head away goals scored; 7) Away goals scored; 8) Play-off.
(C) Champions; (P) Promoted

==== Results summary ====
Overall								Home						Away					
Pld	W	D	L	GF	GA	GD	Pts	W	D	L	GF	GA	GD	W	D	L	GF	GA	GD
34	18	14	2	65	30	+35	68	9	7	1	32	12	+20	9	7	1	33	18	+15

Last updated: 29 June 2020.

==== Results by matchday ====
Matchday	1	2	3	4	5	6	7	8	9	10	11	12	13	14	15	16	17	18	19	20	21	22	23	24	25	26	27	28	29	30	31	32	33	34
Ground	H	A	H	A	H	A	A	H	A	H	A	H	A	H	A	H	A	A	H	A	H	A	H	H	A	H	A	H	A	H	A	H	A	H
Result	D	D	W	W	D	W	W	L	W	D	W	W	W	D	W	D	D	L	W	D	W	W	W	W	D	D	D	W	W	D	D	W	D	W
Position	7	11	7	2	5	3	3	3	3	3	2	2	1	2	1	1	1	1	1	1	1	1	1	1	1	1	1	1	1	1	1	1	1	1

Updated to match(es) played on 15 June 2020. Source: Kicker.de
A = Away; H = Home; W = Win; D = Draw; L = Loss

==== Matches ====
29 July 2019 1	Arminia Bielefeld	1–1	FC St. Pauli	Bielefeld
20:30 CEST	Prietl 90'	Report	Conteh 32'	Stadium: Bielefelder Alm; Attendance: 23,857; Referee: Bastian Dankert

2 August 2019 2	VfL Bochum	3–3	Arminia Bielefeld	Bochum
18:30 CEST	Blum 74' (pen.); Ganvoula 79'; Zoller 85'	Report	Voglsammer 54'; Klos 56'; Losilla 90+1' (o.g.)	Stadium: Ruhrstadion; Attendance: 21,708; Referee: Martin Petersen

17 August 2019 3	Arminia Bielefeld	3–1	Erzgebirge Aue	Bielefeld
13:00 CEST	Nilsson 21'; Klos 60'; Voglsammer 85' (pen.)	Report	Daferner 76'	Stadium: Bielefelder Alm; Attendance: 15,021; Referee: Martin Thomsen

24 August 2019 4	Jahn Regensburg	1–3	Arminia Bielefeld	Regensburg
13:00 CEST	Besuschkow 46'	Report	Edmundsson 43'; Prietl 63'; Yabo 83'	Stadium: Arena Regensburg; Attendance: 9,514; Referee: Pascal Müller

31 August 2019 5	Arminia Bielefeld	2–2	SpVgg Greuther Fürth	Bielefeld
13:00 CEST	Klos 28' (pen.); Edmundsson 62'	Report	Hrgota 4'; Nielsen 22'	Stadium: Bielefelder Alm; Attendance: 15,820; Referee: Tobias Reichel

14 September 2019 6	Hannover 96	0–2	Arminia Bielefeld	Hanover
13:00 CEST	Anton (red card) 80'	Report	Klos 32'; Voglsammer 64' (pen.)	Stadium: HDI-Arena; Attendance: 37,200; Referee: Patrick Ittrich

21 September 2019 7	Wehen Wiesbaden	2–5	Arminia Bielefeld	Wiesbaden
13:00 CEST	Schäffler 4', 56'; Röcker (red card) 79'	Report	Soukou 20'; Klos 34', 73'; Edmundsson 43'; Voglsammer 52'	Stadium: Brita-Arena; Attendance: 4,621; Referee: Patrick Alt

27 September 2019 8	Arminia Bielefeld	0–1	VfB Stuttgart	Bielefeld
18:30 CEST	Klos (red card) 61'	Report	Al Ghaddioui 90+1'	Stadium: Bielefelder Alm; Attendance: 26,124; Referee: Timo Gerach

7 October 2019 9	VfL Osnabrück	0–1	Arminia Bielefeld	Osnabrück
20:30 CEST	Amenyido (red card) 90+4'	Report	Voglsammer 57'	Stadium: Stadion an der Bremer Brücke; Attendance: 15,800; Referee: Markus Schmidt

21 October 2019 10	Arminia Bielefeld	1–1	Hamburger SV	Bielefeld
20:30 CEST	Klos 50'	Report	Hinterseer 15'	Stadium: Bielefelder Alm; Attendance: 26,515; Referee: Frank Willenborg

26 October 2019 11	Dynamo Dresden	0–1	Arminia Bielefeld	Dresden
13:00 CEST		Report	Voglsammer 63'	Stadium: Rudolf-Harbig-Stadion; Attendance: 25,197; Referee: Felix Zwayer

3 November 2019 12	Arminia Bielefeld	2–1	Holstein Kiel	Bielefeld
13:30 CET	Klos 33' (pen.); Voglsammer 73'	Report	Iyoha 68'	Stadium: Bielefelder Alm; Attendance: 19,007; Referee: Robert Kempter

10 November 2019 13	1. FC Nürnberg	1–5	Arminia Bielefeld	Nuremberg
13:30 CET	Sørensen 59'	Report	Clauss 10'; Voglsammer 13'; Klos 15', 60'; Yabo 73'	Stadium: Max-Morlock-Stadion; Attendance: 28,624; Referee: Patrick Ittrich

23 November 2019 14	Arminia Bielefeld	1–1	SV Sandhausen	Bielefeld
13:00 CET	Clauss 19'	Report	Behrens 31'	Stadium: Bielefelder Alm; Attendance: 21,012; Referee: Winkmann

1 December 2019 15	Darmstadt 98	1–3	Arminia Bielefeld	Darmstadt
13:30 CET	Kempe 71'	Report	Klos 48', 49'; Voglsammer 90+2'	Stadium: Merck-Stadion am Böllenfalltor; Attendance: 13,900; Referee: Florian Heft

6 December 2019 16	Arminia Bielefeld	2–2	Karlsruher SC	Bielefeld
18:30 CET	Klos 81' (pen.); Edmundsson 90+3'	Report	Lorenz 25'; Wanitzek 90+1'	Stadium: Bielefelder Alm; Attendance: 20,426; Referee: Martin Petersen

14 December 2019 17	1. FC Heidenheim	0–0	Arminia Bielefeld	Heidenheim an der Brenz
13:00 CET		Report		Stadium: Voith-Arena; Attendance: 11,200; Referee: Tobias Stieler

21 December 2019 18	FC St. Pauli	3–0	Arminia Bielefeld	Hamburg
13:00 CET	Veerman 3', 25'; Gyökeres 54'	Report		Stadium: Millerntor-Stadion; Attendance: 29,546; Referee: Manuel Gräfe

28 January 2020 19	Arminia Bielefeld	2–0	VfL Bochum	Bielefeld
18:30 CET	Voglsammer 27'; Klos 90+3'	Report	Riemann (red card) 83'	Stadium: Bielefelder Alm; Attendance: 19,685; Referee: Robert Kempter

31 January 2020 20	Erzgebirge Aue	0–0	Arminia Bielefeld	Aue
18:30 CET		Report		Stadium: Erzgebirgsstadion; Attendance: 8,000; Referee: Guido Winkmann

9 February 2020 21	Arminia Bielefeld	6–0	Jahn Regensburg	Bielefeld
13:30 CET	Soukou 15'; Edmundsson 35'; Prietl 65'; Correia 86' (o.g.); Yabo 87'; Brunner 90'	Report		Stadium: Bielefelder Alm; Attendance: 18,160; Referee: Sascha Stegemann

15 February 2020 22	SpVgg Greuther Fürth	2–4	Arminia Bielefeld	Fürth
13:00 CET	Nielsen 73'; Redondo 90+2'	Report	Brunner 13'; Klos 35'; Soukou 68' (pen.); Jaeckel 78' (o.g.)	Stadium: Sportpark Ronhof Thomas Sommer; Attendance: 8,770; Referee: Tobias Stieler

23 February 2020 23	Arminia Bielefeld	1–0	Hannover 96	Bielefeld
14:00 CET	Yabo 83'	Report		Stadium: Bielefelder Alm; Attendance: 26,285; Referee: Robert Hartmann

1 March 2020 24	Arminia Bielefeld	1–0	Wehen Wiesbaden	Bielefeld
13:30 CET	Klos 74'	Report		Stadium: Bielefelder Alm; Attendance: 22,373; Referee: Felix Brych

9 March 2020 25	VfB Stuttgart	1–1	Arminia Bielefeld	Stuttgart
20:30 CET	Gómez 53'	Report	Soukou 74'	Stadium: Mercedes-Benz Arena; Attendance: 54,302; Referee: Bastian Dankert

13 March 2020	Arminia Bielefeld	v	VfL Osnabrück	Bielefeld
18:30 CET		Report		Stadium: Bielefelder Alm
Note: Match postponed on 13 March 2020 due to outbreak of SARS-CoV-2.

21 March 2020	Hamburger SV	v	Arminia Bielefeld	Hamburg
13:00 CET		Report		Stadium: Volksparkstadion
Note: Match postponed on 16 March 2020 due to outbreak of SARS-CoV-2.

3 April 2020	Arminia Bielefeld	v	Dynamo Dresden	Bielefeld
18:30 CEST				Stadium: Bielefelder Alm
Note: Match postponed on 24 March 2020 due to fears over the COVID-19 pandemic. It was rescheduled for the 27 May 2019, but was again postponed due to confirmed cases of COVID-19 within Dynamo Dresden's squad.

12 April 2020	Holstein Kiel	v	Arminia Bielefeld	Kiel
				Stadium: Holstein-Stadion
Note: Match postponed on 24 March 2020 due to fears over the COVID-19 pandemic.

19 April 2020	Arminia Bielefeld	v	1. FC Nürnberg	Bielefeld
				Stadium: Bielefelder Alm
Note: Match postponed on 24 March 2020 due to fears over the COVID-19 pandemic.

26 April 2020	SV Sandhausen	v	Arminia Bielefeld	Sandhausen
				Stadium: BWT-Stadion am Hardtwald
Note: Match postponed on 24 March 2020 due to fears over the COVID-19 pandemic.

3 May 2020	Arminia Bielefeld	v	Darmstadt 98	Bielefeld
				Stadium: Bielefelder Alm
Note: Match postponed on 24 March 2020 due to fears over the COVID-19 pandemic.

10 May 2020	Karlsruher SC	v	Arminia Bielefeld	Karlsruhe
				Stadium: Wildparkstadion
Note: Match postponed on 24 March 2020 due to fears over the COVID-19 pandemic.

17 May 2020 26	Arminia Bielefeld	1–1	VfL Osnabrück	Bielefeld
13:30 CEST	Klos 17' (pen.)	Report	Álvarez 90+4'	Stadium: Bielefelder Alm; Attendance: 0 (Note: Match played behind closed doors); Referee: Harm Osmers

24 May 2020 27	Hamburger SV	0–0	Arminia Bielefeld	Hamburg
13:30 CEST		Report		Stadium: Volksparkstadion; Attendance: 0 Referee: Felix Zwayer

30 May 2020 29	Holstein Kiel	1–2	Arminia Bielefeld	Kiel
13:00 CEST	Mühling 51'	Report	Clauss 23'; Schipplock 90+2'	Stadium: Holstein-Stadion; Attendance: 0 Referee: Patrick Ittrich

6 June 2020 30	Arminia Bielefeld	1–1	1. FC Nürnberg	Bielefeld
13:00 CEST	Klos 14'	Report	Erras 43'	Stadium: Bielefelder Alm; Attendance: 0 Referee: René Rohde

12 June 2020 31	SV Sandhausen	0–0	Arminia Bielefeld	Sandhausen
18:30 CEST		Report		Stadium: BWT-Stadion am Hardtwald; Attendance: 0 Referee: Arne Aarnink

15 June 2020 28	Arminia Bielefeld	4–0	Dynamo Dresden	Bielefeld
20:30 CEST	Clauss 10'; Voglsammer 62'; Klos 65'; Soukou 87'	Report		Stadium: Bielefelder Alm; Attendance: 0 Referee: Johann Pfeifer

18 June 2020 32	Arminia Bielefeld	1–0	SV Darmstadt 98	Bielefeld
20:30 CEST	Prietl 52'	Report		Stadium: Bielefelder Alm; Attendance: 0 Referee: Benedikt Kempkes

21 June 2020 33	Karlsruher SC	3–3	Arminia Bielefeld	Karlsruhe
15:30 CEST	Hofmann 25', 70' (pen.), 88' (pen.)	Report	Hartel 3'; Klos 10'; Kobald 20' (o.g.)	Stadium: Wildparkstadion; Attendance: 0 Referee: Benjamin Brand

28 June 2020 34	Arminia Bielefeld	3–0	1. FC Heidenheim	Bielefeld
15:30 CEST	Klos 13'; Voglsammer 17'; Clauss 53'	Report		Stadium: Bielefelder Alm; Attendance: 0 Referee: Manuel Gräfe

=== DFB-Pokal ===
10 August 2019 1st round	Viktoria Berlin	0–1	Arminia Bielefeld	Berlin (Note: The Viktoria Berlin v Arminia Bielefeld match took place at the Friedrich-Ludwig-Jahn-Sportpark in Berlin instead of Viktoria Berlin's home stadium.)
15:30 CEST		Report	Voglsammer 15'	Stadium: Friedrich-Ludwig-Jahn-Sportpark; Attendance: 4,503; Referee: Franz Bokop

29 October 2019 2nd round	Arminia Bielefeld	2–3	Schalke 04	Bielefeld
20:45 CET	Klos 72'; Soukou 77'	Report	Schöpf 16'; Raman 25', 31'	Stadium: Bielefelder Alm; Attendance: 26,203; Referee: Manuel Gräfe

== Statistics ==
=== Appearances and goals ===
No.	Pos	Nat	Player	Total		Bundesliga		DFB-Pokal	
No.	Pos	Nat	Player	Apps	Goals	Apps	Goals	Apps	Goals
Goalkeepers
1	GK	(Germany) GER	Stefan Ortega	36	0	34	0	2	0
31	GK	(Hungary) HUN	Ágoston Kiss	0	0	0	0	0	0
34	GK	(Sweden) SWE	Oscar Linnér	0	0	0	0	0	0
40	GK	(Germany) GER	Philipp Klewin	0	0	0	0	0	0
Defenders
2	DF	(Germany) GER	Amos Pieper	33	0	29+2	0	1+1	0
3	DF	(Germany) GER	Brian Behrendt	8	0	6+1	0	1	0
4	DF	(Sweden) SWE	Joakim Nilsson	31	1	29	1	2	0
8	DF	(Germany) GER	Florian Hartherz	33	0	31+1	0	1	0
11	DF	(Germany) GER	Stephan Salger	17	0	3+14	0	0	0
23	DF	(Germany) GER	Anderson Lucoqui	5	0	3+1	0	1	0
24	DF	(Spain) ESP	Alex Pérez	3	0	1+2	0	0	0
25	DF	(France) FRA	Jonathan Clauss	36	5	30+4	5	2	0
27	DF	(Switzerland) SUI	Cédric Brunner	27	2	26+1	2	0	0
Midfielders
6	MF	(Germany) GER	Tom Schütz	14	0	1+12	0	0+1	0
7	MF	(Germany) GER	Patrick Weihrauch	5	0	1+4	0	0	0
10	MF	(Germany) GER	Reinhold Yabo	25	4	16+8	4	1	0
14	MF	(Faroe Islands) FRO	Jóan Símun Edmundsson	23	5	17+5	5	1	0
16	MF	(Germany) GER	Fabian Kunze	16	0	4+11	0	0+1	0
19	MF	(Austria) AUT	Manuel Prietl	33	4	31	4	2	0
20	MF	(Germany) GER	Nils Seufert	17	0	8+7	0	1+1	0
29	MF	(Benin) BEN	Cebio Soukou	32	6	15+16	5	1	1
30	MF	(Germany) GER	Marcel Hartel	35	1	32+1	1	2	0
32	MF	(Germany) GER	Keanu Staude	5	0	1+4	0	0	0
38	MF	(Germany) GER	Jomaine Consbruch	1	0	0+1	0	0	0
Forwards
9	FW	(Germany) GER	Fabian Klos	35	22	32+1	21	2	1
13	FW	(Germany) GER	Sebastian Müller	0	0	0	0	0	0
18	FW	(Germany) GER	Nils Quaschner	0	0	0	0	0	0
21	FW	(Germany) GER	Andreas Voglsammer	31	13	23+6	12	2	1
36	FW	(Germany) GER	Sven Schipplock	9	1	1+8	1	0	0
Players transferred out during the season

Last updated: 28 June 2020
