= 2017–18 Arminia Bielefeld season =

Arminia Bielefeld
2017–18 season
- Chairman: Hans-Jürgen Laufer
- Manager: Jeff Saibene
- Stadium: Bielefelder Alm
- 2. Bundesliga: 4th
- DFB-Pokal: First round
Home colours	Away colours
- All statistics correct as of 28 January 2018.

The 2017–18 Arminia Bielefeld season was the 113th season in the football club's history. The season covered a period from 1 July 2017 to 30 June 2018.

Arminia Bielefeld finished 4th in the 2017–18 2. Bundesliga and were eliminated in the first round of the 2017–18 DFB-Pokal.

== Players ==
=== Squad information ===
As of 23 February 2018

Note: Flags indicate national team as defined under FIFA eligibility rules; some limited exceptions apply. Players may hold more than one non-FIFA nationality.

No.	Pos.	Nation	Player
1	GK	GER	Stefan Ortega
3	DF	GER	Brian Behrendt
5	MF	FRA	David Ulm
6	MF	GER	Tom Schütz
7	MF	GER	Patrick Weihrauch
9	FW	GER	Fabian Klos (captain)
10	FW	GER	Christopher Nöthe
11	DF	GER	Stephan Salger
13	DF	GER	Julian Börner (Captain)
16	FW	GER	Sören Brandy
17	MF	GER	Christoph Hemlein
19	MF	AUT	Manuel Prietl

No.	Pos.	Nation	Player
21	FW	GER	Andreas Voglsammer
22	FW	GHA	Roberto Massimo
23	DF	GER	Florian Dick
27	MF	AUT	Konstantin Kerschbaumer (on loan from Brentford)
28	DF	GER	Florian Hartherz
29	FW	GER	Leandro Putaro
31	DF	GER	Henri Weigelt
32	MF	GER	Keanu Staude
33	GK	GER	Nikolai Rehnen
34	MF	GER	Can Özkan
40	GK	GAM	Baboucarr Gaye

== Friendly matches ==
Friendly match details
Date	Time	Opponent	Venue	Result F–A	Scorers	Ref.
29 June 2017	19:00	Hiddenhausen	Away	10–0	Unknown	
2 July 2017	16:00	Fichte Bielefeld	Away	10–0	Unknown	
8 July 2017	15:00	Rubin Kazan	Away	4–0	Klos 6' pen., 23', Prietl 14', Hemlein 31' pen.	
9 July 2017	15:00	FC Ufa	Home	0–1		
12 July 2017	18:00	1. FK Příbram	Home	5–1	Unknown	
12 July 2017	18:00	Wuppertaler SV	Away	1–0	Kerschbaumer 56'	
21 July 2017	19:00	Norwich City	Home	1–3	Voglsammer 39'	
8 November 2017	16:00	Borussia Mönchengladbach	Away	1–4	Staude 75'	

== Competitions ==
Win Draw Loss

=== 2. Bundesliga ===
==== League table ====
Pos	Team	Pld	W	D	L	GF	GA	GD	Pts	Promotion, qualification or relegation
2	1. FC Nürnberg (P)	34	17	9	8	61	39	+22	60	Promotion to Bundesliga
3	Holstein Kiel	34	14	14	6	71	44	+27	56	Qualification for promotion play-offs
4	Arminia Bielefeld	34	12	12	10	51	47	+4	48	
5	Jahn Regensburg	34	14	6	14	53	53	0	48	
6	VfL Bochum	34	13	9	12	37	40	−3	48	

Source: DFB
Rules for classification: 1) Points; 2) Goal difference; 3) Goals scored
(P) Promoted

==== Matches ====
2. Bundesliga match details
Match	Date	Time	Opponent	Venue	Result F–A	Scorers	Attendance	Ref.
1	29 July 2017	15:30	Jahn Regensburg	Home	2–1	Staude 39', Šporar 90'	17,333	
2	6 August 2017	15:30	Greuther Fürth	Away	2–1	Staude 38', Klos 42' pen.	9,070	
3	21 August 2017	20:30	VfL Bochum	Home	2–0	Voglsammer 21', Kerschbaumer 35'	20,663	
4	27 August 2017	13:30	Union Berlin	Away	1–1	Voglsammer 46'	21,034	
5	9 September 2017	13:00	MSV Duisburg	Home	0–4		18,537	
6	17 September 2017	13:30	Darmstadt 98	Away	3–4	Voglsammer 30', Klos 35', Brandy 90+3	15,700	
7	20 September 2017	18:30	Dynamo Dresden	Away	2–0	Voglsammer 80', Weihrauch 90+2'	26,864	
8	23 September 2017	13:00	1. FC Heidenheim	Home	1–1	Börner 78'	15,184	
9	30 September 2017	13:00	1. FC Nürnberg	Away	2–1	Šporar 61', Kerschbaumer 86'	26,186	
10	14 October 2017	13:00	Fortuna Düsseldorf	Home	0–2		21,554	
11	21 October 2017	13:00	Holstein Kiel	Away	1–2	Czichos 85' o.g.	11,224	
12	27 October 2017	18:30	FC Ingolstadt 04	Home	1–3	Börner 29'	15,005	
13	5 November 2017	13:30	Erzgebirge Aue	Away	1–1	Voglsammer 90+1'	7,500	
14	17 November 2017	18:30	Eintracht Braunschweig	Home	2–2	Schütz 7', Putaro 90'	16,367	
15	26 November 2017	13:30	1. FC Kaiserslautern	Away	2–0	Voglsammer 27', Kerschbaumer 90+5'	20,464	
16	1 December 2017	18:30	FC St. Pauli	Home	5–0	Putaro 38', Dick 53', Hartherz 62', Kerschbaumer 77', Klos 85'	22,826	
17	10 December 2017	13:30	SV Sandhausen	Away	1–3	Voglsammer 36'	4,354	
18	16 December 2017	13:00	Jahn Regensburg	Away	2–3	Voglsammer 12', Kerschbaumer 90+2'	7,137	
19	24 January 2018	20:30	Greuther Fürth	Home	0–0		12,512	
20	29 January 2018	20:30	VfL Bochum	Away	1–0	Hartherz 68'	12,417	
21	5 February 2018	20:30	Union Berlin	Home	1–1	Kerschbaumer 53'	13,542	
22	10 February 2018	13:00	MSV Duisburg	Away	2–2	Schütz 39', Weihrauch 67'	16,213	
23	17 February 2018	13:00	Darmstadt 98	Home	2–0	Weihrauch 33', Kerschbaumer 90+3'	15,236	
24	23 February 2018	18:30	Dynamo Dresden	Home	2–3	Hartherz 28', Voglsammer 76' pen.	17,503	
25	4 March 2018	13:30	1. FC Heidenheim	Away	2–2	Börner 66', Voglsammer 90+1'	10,300	
26	9 March 2018	18:30	1. FC Nürnberg	Home	1–0	Kerschbaumer 90'	18,542	
27	16 March 2018	18:30	Fortuna Düsseldorf	Away	2–4	Börner 25', Schütz 50'	29,567	
28	1 April 2018	13:30	Holstein Kiel	Home	1–1	Behrendt 21'	20,150	
29	8 April 2018	13:30	FC Ingolstadt 04	Away	2–2	Klos 60', Voglsammer 77'	10,213	
30	14 April 2018	13:00	Erzgebirge Aue	Home	2–0	Voglsammer 42', Klos 69'	16,605	
31	20 April 2018	18:30	Eintracht Braunschweig	Away	0–0		22,285	
32	27 April 2018	18:30	1. FC Kaiserslautern	Home	3–2	Klos 62' pen., 90+3', Voglsammer 70'	21,404	
33	6 May 2018	15:30	FC St. Pauli	Away	0–1		29,546	
34	13 May 2018	15:30	SV Sandhausen	Home	0–0		23,070	

=== DFB-Pokal ===
DFB-Pokal match details
Round	Date	Time	Opponent	Venue	Result F–A	Scorers	Attendance	Ref.
First round	12 August 2017	18:30	Fortuna Düsseldorf	Home	1–3 (a.e.t.)	Klos 55'	19,825	
