= Sebastian Müller =

German footballer (born 2001)

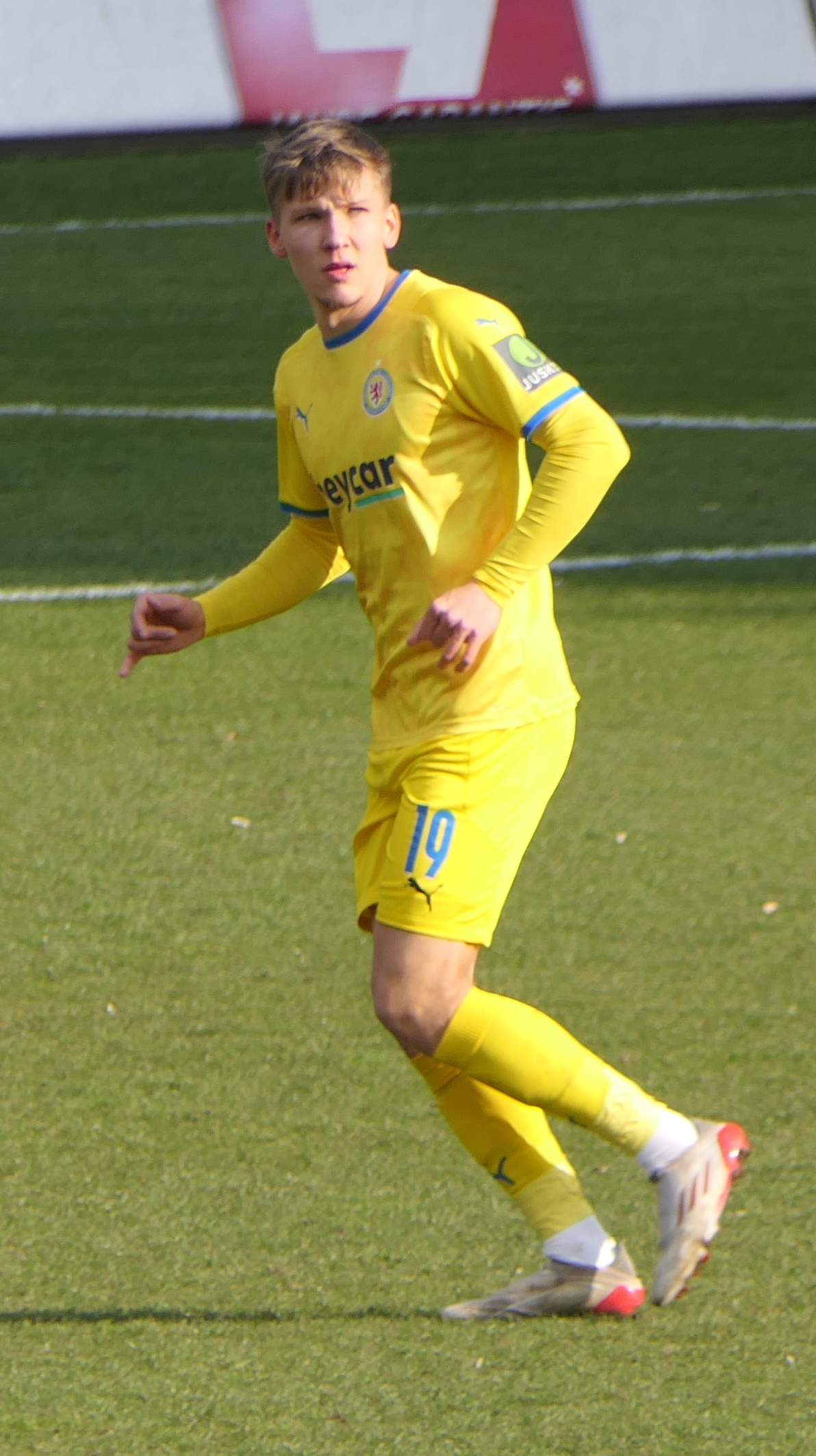
- Müller with Eintracht Braunschweig in 2022

Personal information
- Date of birth: 23 January 2001 (age 25)
- Place of birth: Schwalmstadt, Germany
- Height: 1.80 m (5 ft 11 in)
- Position: Forward

Team information
- Current team: Stuttgarter Kickers
- Number: 9

Youth career
- 2009–2012: 1. FC Schwalmstadt
- 2012: SV 06 Alsfeld
- 2013–2016: TSG Wieseck
- 2016–2020: 1. FC Köln
- 2020: Arminia Bielefeld

Senior career*
Years	Team	Apps	(Gls)
2020–2023	Arminia Bielefeld	2	(0)
2021	→ VfL Osnabrück (loan)	8	(0)
2021–2022	→ Eintracht Braunschweig (loan)	24	(3)
2022–2023	→ Hallescher FC (loan)	31	(2)
2023–2024	SpVgg Greuther Fürth II	30	(9)
2024–2026	1. FC Schweinfurt 05	59	(15)
2026–	Stuttgarter Kickers	8	(1)

International career^{‡}
2019	Germany U19	6	(0)
2020	Germany U20	2	(0)
- * Club domestic league appearances and goals as of 24 September 2026 ‡ National team caps and goals as of 16:35, 12 December 2020 (UTC)

Sebastian Müller (born 23 January 2001) is a German professional footballer who plays as a forward for Regionalliga Südwest club Stuttgarter Kickers.

== Career ==
Müller played for the youth teams of 1. FC Schwalmstadt, SV 06 Alsfeld, TSG Wieseck and 1. FC Köln.

In January 2020, Müller joined 2. Bundesliga club Arminia Bielefeld, who were promoted to the Bundesliga at the end of the season. He made his professional debut for Arminia Bielefeld in the Bundesliga on 12 December 2020, coming on as a substitute in the 89th minute for Anderson Lucoqui against SC Freiburg. The away match finished as a 2–0 loss for Bielefeld.

On 1 February 2021, the last day of the 2020–21 winter transfer window, Müller moved to 2. Bundesliga side VfL Osnabrück on loan until summer 2022.

On 15 June 2022, Müller moved on a new loan to Hallescher FC in 3. Liga.

In July 2023, Müller left Arminia Bielefeld and joined Regionalliga Bayern club SpVgg Greuther Fürth II on a permanent deal.

== Honours ==
- 2. Bundesliga: 2019–20
- Regionalliga Bayern: 2024–25
- Saxony-Anhalt Cup: 2022–23
