= Tom Schütz =

German footballer

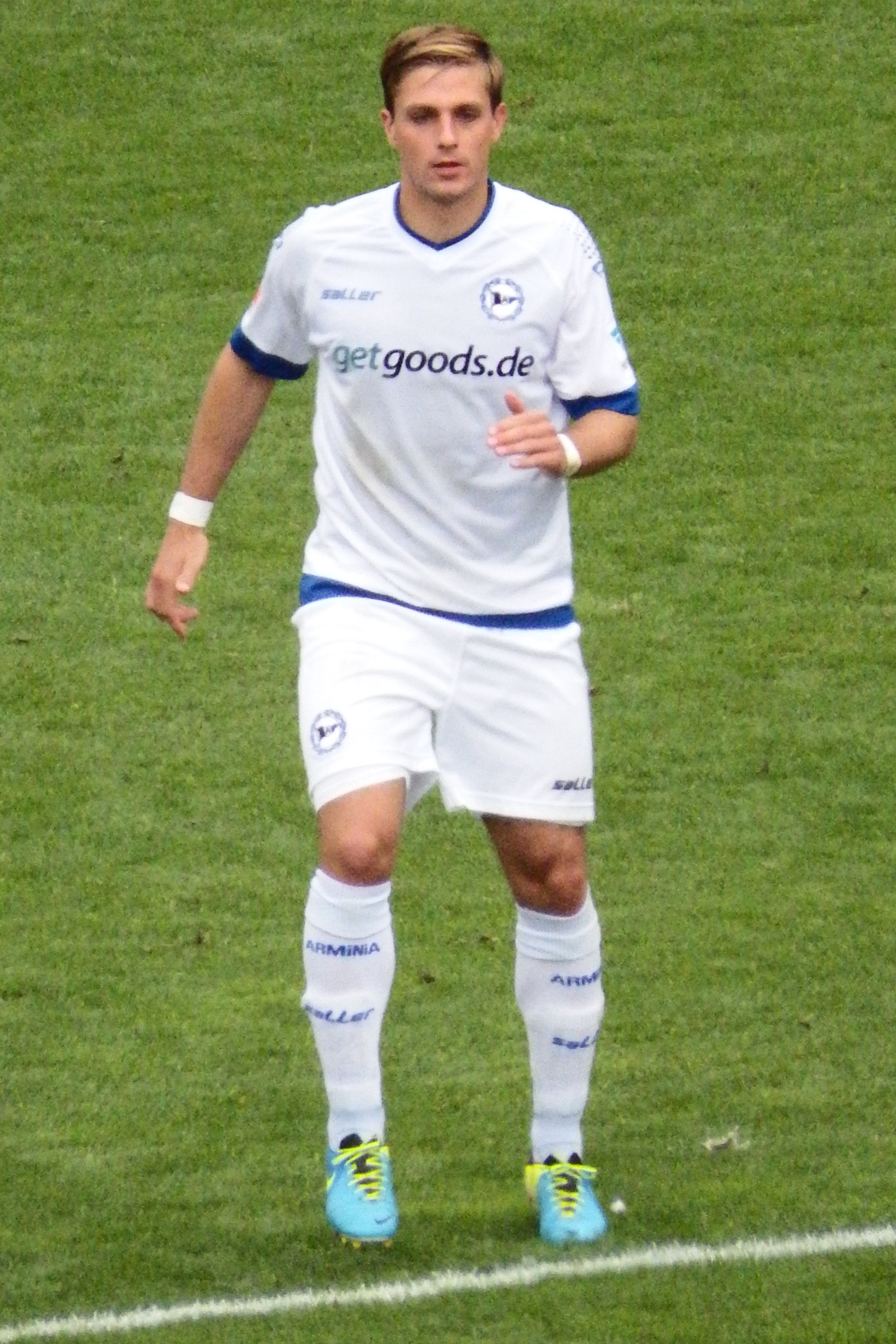
- Schütz with Arminia Bielefeld in 2013

Personal information
- Date of birth: 20 January 1988 (age 38)
- Place of birth: Bamberg, West Germany
- Height: 1.81 m (5 ft 11 in)
- Positions: Defensive midfielder; centre-back

Team information
- Current team: Arminia Bielefeld (U17 assistant)

Youth career
- –2005: 1. FC Haßfurt

Senior career*
Years	Team	Apps	(Gls)
2005–2010	Bayern Munich II	111	(1)
2010–2011	SV Babelsberg 03	36	(1)
2011–2020	Arminia Bielefeld	243	(16)
Total		390	(18)

International career
2007	Germany U-20	1	(0)

Managerial career
- 2020–2021: Arminia Bielefeld (U17 assistant)
- 2022–: Arminia Bielefeld (U17 assistant)
- * Club domestic league appearances and goals

Tom Schütz (born 20 January 1988) is a former German professional footballer who played as a defensive midfielder or centre-back.

== Cocaching career ==
In the summer of 2020, alongside his playing career, Schütz began working as an assistant coach for Arminia Bielefeld's U-17 team. Schütz then retired from professional football in November 2020. Starting with his retirement as a player, Schütz also began working in various roles in the club's offices. He also held this role in the 2021–22 season, before becoming assistant coach of the club's U-17 team again from the 2022–23 season.

== Career statistics ==
Appearances and goals by club, season and competition
Club	Season	League			Cup		Other		Total	
Club	Season	Division	Apps	Goals	Apps	Goals	Apps	Goals	Apps	Goals
Bayern Munich II	2005–06	Regionalliga Süd	1	0	—		—		1	0
Bayern Munich II	2006–07	Regionalliga Süd	22	0	—		—		22	0
Bayern Munich II	2007–08	Regionalliga Süd	23	0	—		—		23	0
Bayern Munich II	2008–09	3. Liga	34	0	—		—		34	0
Bayern Munich II	2009–10	3. Liga	31	1	—		—		31	1
Bayern Munich II	Total		111	1	0	0	0	0	111	1
SV Babelsberg 03	2010–11	3. Liga	36	1	1	0	—		37	1
Arminia Bielefeld	2011–12	3. Liga	38	2	1	0	—		39	2
Arminia Bielefeld	2012–13	3. Liga	35	1	2	2	—		37	3
Arminia Bielefeld	2013–14	2. Bundesliga	27	1	2	0	2 (Note: Appearances in relegation play-offs)	0	31	1
Arminia Bielefeld	2014–15	3. Liga	31	5	4	0	—		35	5
Arminia Bielefeld	2015–16	2. Bundesliga	24	1	1	0	—		25	1
Arminia Bielefeld	2016–17	2. Bundesliga	31	2	4	1	—		35	3
Arminia Bielefeld	2017–18	2. Bundesliga	27	3	0	0	—		27	3
Arminia Bielefeld	2018–19	2. Bundesliga	17	1	1	1	—		18	2
Arminia Bielefeld	2019–20	2. Bundesliga	13	0	1	0	—		14	0
Arminia Bielefeld	Total		243	16	16	4	2	0	261	20
Career total			390	18	17	4	2	0	409	22
