= Philipp Klewin =

German footballer (born 1993)

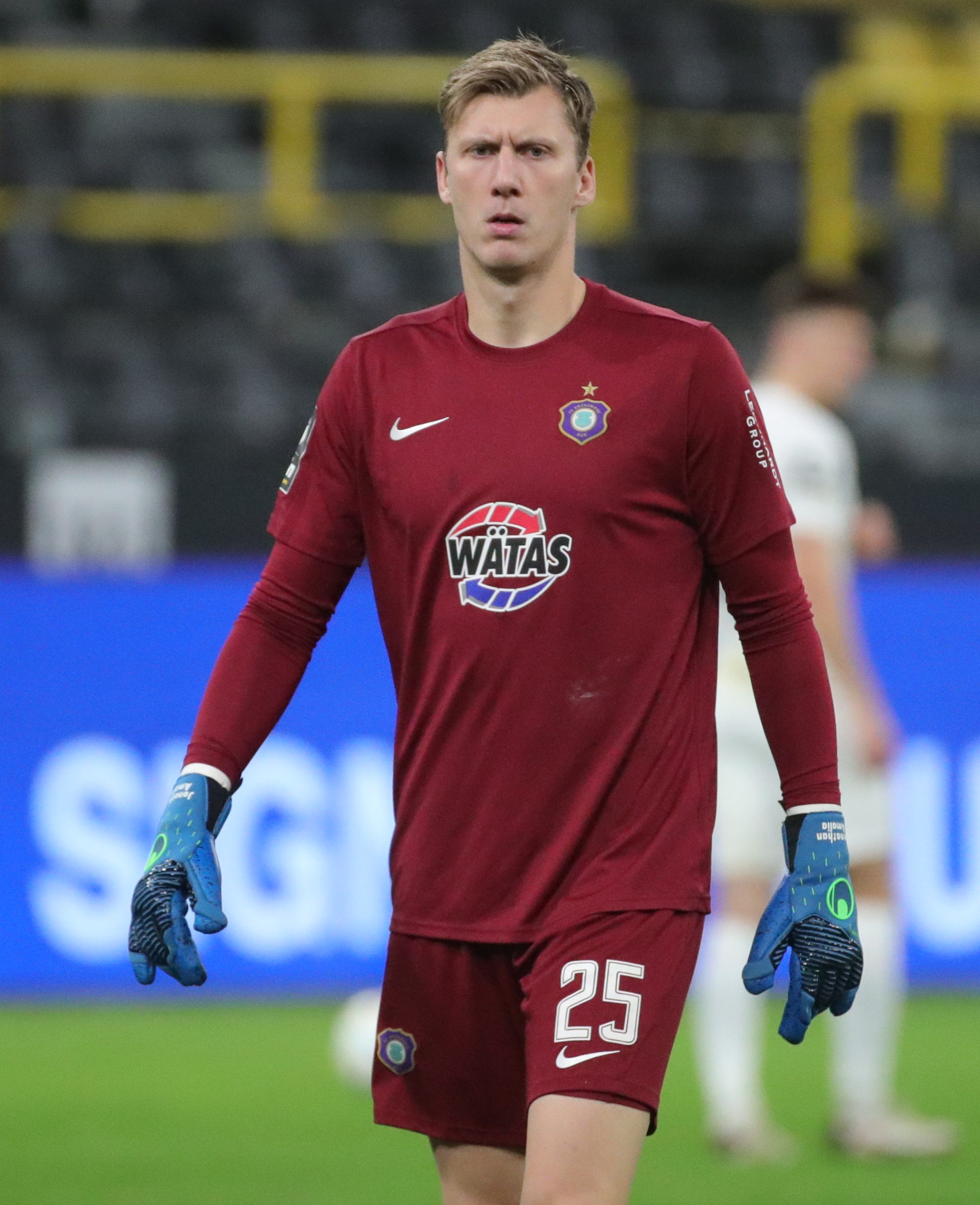
- Klewin in 2022

Personal information
- Full name: Philipp Mickel Klewin
- Date of birth: 30 September 1993 (age 33)
- Place of birth: Friedrichroda, Germany
- Height: 1.92 m (6 ft 4 in)
- Position: Goalkeeper

Team information
- Current team: Hansa Rostock
- Number: 25

Youth career
- SV Grün-Weiss Schönstedt
- –2012: Rot-Weiß Erfurt

Senior career*
Years	Team	Apps	(Gls)
2011–2015	Rot-Weiß Erfurt II	18	(0)
2013–2018	Rot-Weiß Erfurt	177	(0)
2018–2020	Arminia Bielefeld	3	(0)
2020–2023	Erzgebirge Aue	19	(0)
2023–2024	VfB Lübeck	33	(0)
2024–	Hansa Rostock	0	(0)
- * Club domestic league appearances and goals as of 22 May 2024

Philipp Mickel Klewin (born 30 September 1993) is a German professional footballer who plays for 3. Liga club Hansa Rostock as a goalkeeper.

== Club career ==
He made his debut for FC Rot-Weiß Erfurt in April 2013, in a 1–0 defeat against VfB Stuttgart II.

On 5 June 2023, Klewin signed a two-year contract with VfB Lübeck.

On 13 July 2024, Klewin moved to Hansa Rostock.

== Career statistics ==
As of match played 18 May 2024

Appearances and goals by club, season and competition
Club	Season	League			National cup		Total	
Club	Season	Division	Apps	Goals	Apps	Goals	Apps	Goals
Rot-Weiß Erfurt II	2011–12	NOFV-Oberliga Süd	5	0	—		20	0
Rot-Weiß Erfurt II	2012–13	NOFV-Oberliga Süd	11	0	—		1	0
Rot-Weiß Erfurt II	2013–14	NOFV-Oberliga Süd	1	0	—		18	0
Rot-Weiß Erfurt II	2015–16	NOFV-Oberliga Süd	1	0	—		18	0
Rot-Weiß Erfurt II	Total		18	0	—		18	0
Rot-Weiß Erfurt	2011–12	3. Liga	0	0	—		0	0
Rot-Weiß Erfurt	2012–13	3. Liga	7	0	—		7	0
Rot-Weiß Erfurt	2013–14	3. Liga	37	0	—		37	0
Rot-Weiß Erfurt	2014–15	3. Liga	38	0	—		38	0
Rot-Weiß Erfurt	2015–16	3. Liga	21	0	—		21	0
Rot-Weiß Erfurt	2016–17	3. Liga	38	0	—		38	0
Rot-Weiß Erfurt	2017–18	3. Liga	36	0	1	0	37	0
Rot-Weiß Erfurt	Total		177	0	1	0	178	0
Arminia Bielefeld	2018–19	2. Bundesliga	3	0	2	0	5	0
Arminia Bielefeld	2019–20	2. Bundesliga	0	0	0	0	0	0
Arminia Bielefeld	Total		3	0	2	0	5	0
Erzgebirge Aue	2020–21	2. Bundesliga	1	0	0	0	1	0
Erzgebirge Aue	2021–22	2. Bundesliga	7	0	0	0	7	0
Erzgebirge Aue	2022–23	3. Liga	11	0	1	0	12	0
Erzgebirge Aue	Total		19	0	1	0	20	0
VfB Lübeck	2023–24	3. Liga	33	0	1	0	34	0
Hansa Rostock	2024–25	3. Liga	0	0	0	0	0	0
Hansa Rostock	2025–26	3. Liga	0	0	0	0	0	0
Hansa Rostock	Total		0	0	0	0	0	0
Career total			250	0	5	0	255	0
