= Jóan Símun Edmundsson =

Faroese footballer (born 1991)

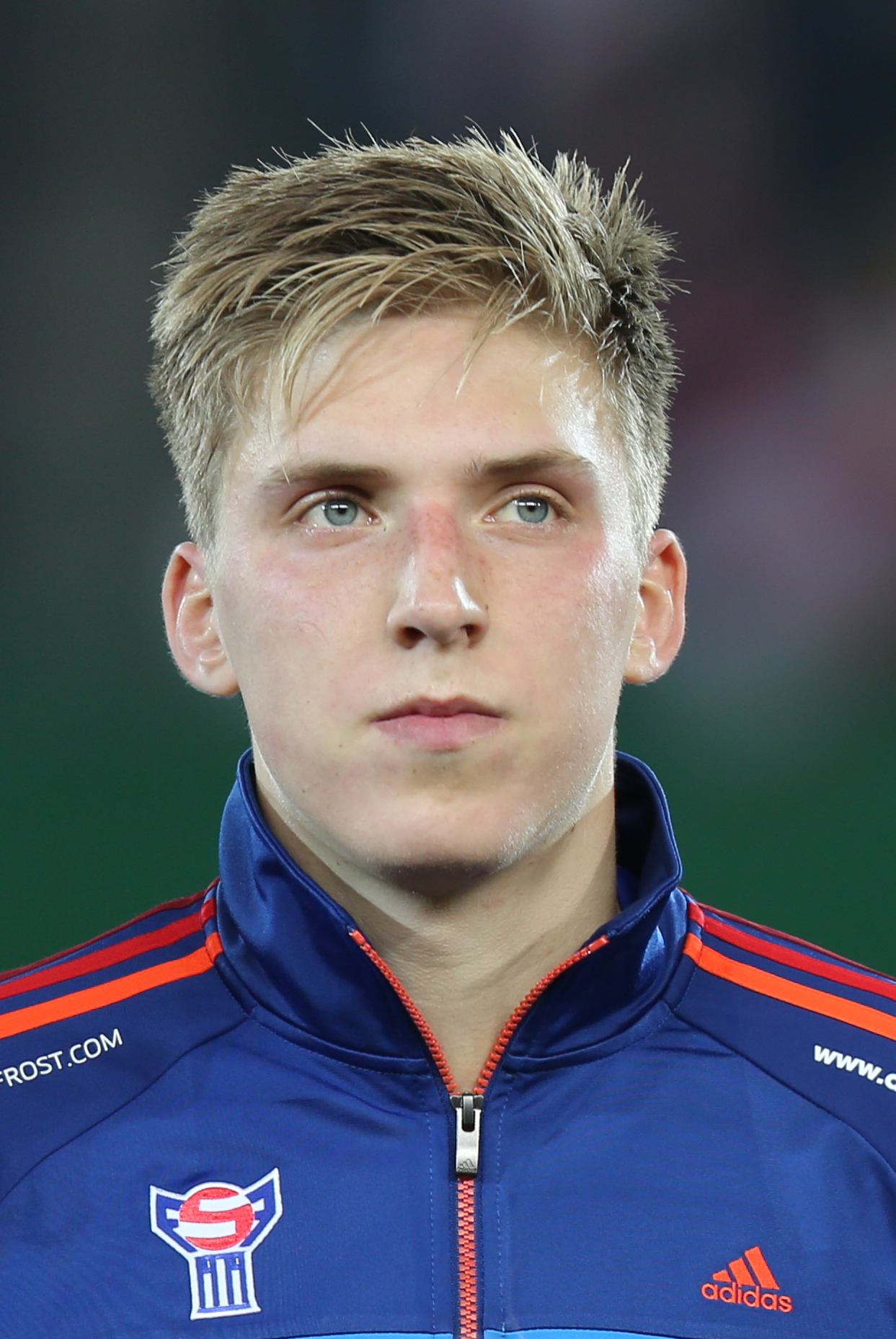
- Edmundsson lining up for the Faroe Islands in 2013

Personal information
- Full name: Jóan Símun Edmundsson
- Date of birth: 26 July 1991 (age 35)
- Place of birth: Toftir, Faroe Islands
- Height: 1.84 m (6 ft 0 in)
- Position: Forward

Team information
- Current team: KA Akureyri
- Number: 7

Youth career
- B68 Toftir

Senior career*
Years	Team	Apps	(Gls)
2008–2010	B68 Toftir	49	(10)
2010	→ Newcastle United (loan)	0	(0)
2010–2012	Newcastle United	0	(0)
2011	→ Gateshead (loan)	5	(0)
2012–2013	Viking	8	(0)
2012	→ Fredericia (loan)	8	(0)
2014	AB	9	(2)
2014–2015	HB	11	(6)
2015	Vejle Boldklub	26	(10)
2016–2018	OB	58	(11)
2018–2021	Arminia Bielefeld	51	(10)
2021–2023	Beveren	17	(2)
2023–2024	KA Akureyri	10	(2)
2024–2025	KF Shkupi	14	(1)
2025–	KA Akureyri	28	(4)

International career^{‡}
2006–2007	Faroe Islands U17	9	(0)
2008	Faroe Islands U19	3	(0)
2009–2012	Faroe Islands U21	9	(3)
2009–	Faroe Islands	99	(8)
- * Club domestic league appearances and goals as of 10 July 2026 ‡ National team caps and goals as of 19:58, 18 November 2025 (UTC)

Jóan Símun Edmundsson (born 26 July 1991) is a Faroese professional footballer who plays for Icelandic club KA Akureyri and the Faroe Islands national team.

He is Faroe Islands national team most capped player.

== Club career ==
=== B68 Toftir ===
Edmundsson started his career with B68 Toftir.

=== Newcastle United ===
In December 2009, Edmundsson joined Newcastle United on loan until the end of the season, with a view to a permanent deal, after a successful trial during a reserve friendly against Hibernian. He signed a permanent deal in June as a hot prospect for the future. He made his first team debut for Newcastle in a friendly against Norwich City on 25 July 2010.

On 7 January 2011, Edmundsson joined Gateshead on a 28-day loan. He made his Gateshead debut on 8 January 2011 against Kidderminster Harriers. He scored his first goal for Gateshead on 15 January 2011 in the FA Trophy in a 6–0 win against Hampton & Richmond Borough.

He featured regularly for the reserves between 2010 and 2012; however, he failed to reach first team football for Newcastle.

=== Viking and return to Faroe Islands ===
Edmundsson signed for Viking Stavanger on 15 February 2012.

Following his stint at Viking he returned to the Faroe Islands playing for AB and HB.

=== Vejle and OB in Denmark ===
In December 2014 Edmundsson signed a two-year contract with Vejle Boldklub.

In January 2016 Edmundsson signed a 2.5-year contract with Danish Superliga club Odense Boldklub.

On 28 November 2015, Edmundsson scored what Danish TV3+ commentators later dubbed as "The Goal of the Century" in Danish football, and made comparisons with high-profile players such as Lionel Messi, George Best and Diego Maradona. In a 1–3 loss against Silkeborg IF in the Danish 1st Division, Edmundsson shook off most of the Silkeborg midfielders, and danced through the middle into the box, evading three more challenges, before hitting a placed shot in the back of the net.

In December 2015, Edmundsson won the TV3+ "Best Goal of the Year award", beating notable players such as Neymar and Lionel Messi.

=== Arminia Bielefeld ===
In May 2018, it was announced Edmundsson would join 2. Bundesliga side Arminia Bielefeld from Odense BK for the 2018–19 season having agreed a contract until summer 2020. On 6 August 2018, Edmundsson became the first Faroese goalscorer in German professional football when he scored in his debut against FC Heidenheim.

On 26 September 2020, Edmundsson made his debut in the Bundesliga against 1. FC Köln. Having come from the bench for Sergio Córdova in the second half, he scored the winning goal, becoming the first Faroese to ever play and score in the Bundesliga.

On 30 June 2021, Edmundsson was released by Arminia Bielefeld after reaching the end of his contract.

=== Beveren ===
On 26 June 2021, he joined Belgian side Beveren.

== International career ==
Edmundsson was capped at under-19, under-21, during which he scored a memorable goal in a shock 1–0 win over Russia, and full international level while playing in his homeland, making his debut for the Faroe Islands against France in August 2009. He scored his first senior goal in the 2–1 defeat to Estonia on 11 August 2010, this was the first goal of the UEFA Euro 2012 qualifying.

On 14 November 2014, he scored the only goal of the game to defeat Greece in Piraeus, the Faroes' first competitive victory since June 2011.

On 9 June 2025, he made his 95th appearance with the Faroe Islands in a 2–1 win over Gibraltar, equalling the tally of Fróði Benjaminsen to become with the latter Faroe Islands' joint most capped player.

On 5 September 2025, he played his 96th international game in a 1–0 defeat against Croatia in a 2026 FIFA World Cup qualification game, becoming the Faroe Islands sole most capped player. Later that year, on 18 November, he became the first player to have made 100 international caps for the Faroe Islands in a non-competitive 1–0 win over Kazakhstan.

== Career statistics ==
=== Club ===
As of 7 August 2021

Appearances and goals by club, season and competition
Club	Season	League			National cup		Other		Total	
Club	Season	Division	Apps	Goals	Apps	Goals	Apps	Goals	Apps	Goals
B68 Toftir	2008	Effodeildin	23	4	1	0	0	0	24	4
B68 Toftir	2009	Effodeildin	25	6	1	0	0	0	26	6
B68 Toftir	2010	Effodeildin	0	0	0	0	0	0	0	0
B68 Toftir	Total		48	10	2	0	0	0	50	10
Newcastle United (loan)	2009–10	Championship	0	0	0	0	—		0	0
Newcastle United	2010–11	Premier League	0	0	0	0	—		0	0
Gateshead (loan)	2010–11	Conference Premier	5	0	0	0	1 (Note: Appearance in the FA Trophy)	1	6	1
Viking	2012	Tippeligaen	2	0	1	0	0	0	3	0
Viking	2013	Tippeligaen	6	0	1	1	0	0	7	1
Viking	Total		8	0	2	1	0	0	10	1
Fredericia (loan)	2012–13	1. Division	8	0	0	0	—		8	0
AB	2014	Effodeildin	9	2	0	0	0	0	9	2
HB	2015	Effodeildin	11	6	0	0	4 (Note: Appearances in the Champions League)	1	15	7
Vejle	2014–15	1. Division	12	3	0	0	—		12	3
Vejle	2015–16	1. Division	14	7	0	0	—		14	7
Vejle	Total		26	10	2	0	0	0	26	10
OB	2015–16	Superligaen	5	0	0	0	0	0	5	0
OB	2016–17	Superligaen	29	9	1	0	0	0	30	9
OB	2017–18	Superligaen	24	2	2	0	0	0	26	2
OB	Total		58	11	3	0	0	0	61	11
Arminia Bielefeld	2018–19	2. Bundesliga	24	4	1	0	0	0	25	4
Arminia Bielefeld	2019–20	2. Bundesliga	22	5	1	0	0	0	23	5
Arminia Bielefeld	2020–21	Bundesliga	5	1	0	0	0	0	5	1
Arminia Bielefeld	Total		51	10	2	0	0	0	53	10
Career total			223	49	9	1	5	2	238	52

=== International ===
As of match played 18 November 2025

Appearances and goals by national team and year
National team	Year	Apps	Goals
Faroe Islands	2009	1	0
Faroe Islands	2010	8	1
Faroe Islands	2011	4	0
Faroe Islands	2012	4	0
Faroe Islands	2013	8	0
Faroe Islands	2014	5	2
Faroe Islands	2015	5	1
Faroe Islands	2016	5	2
Faroe Islands	2017	5	0
Faroe Islands	2018	6	1
Faroe Islands	2019	6	0
Faroe Islands	2020	3	0
Faroe Islands	2021	12	0
Faroe Islands	2022	5	1
Faroe Islands	2023	8	0
Faroe Islands	2024	8	0
Faroe Islands	2025	7	0
Total		99	8

Scores and results list Faroe Islands' goal tally first, score column indicates score after each Edmundsson goal.

List of international goals scored by Jóan Símun Edmundsson
No.	Date	Venue	Opponent	Score	Result	Competition
1	11 August 2010	A. Le Coq Arena, Tallinn, Estonia	Estonia	1–0	1–2	UEFA Euro 2012 qualification
2	1 March 2014	Victoria Stadium, Gibraltar	Gibraltar	1–1	4–1	Friendly
3	14 November 2014	Karaiskakis Stadium, Piraeus, Greece	Greece	1–0	1–0	UEFA Euro 2016 qualification
4	4 September 2015	Tórsvøllur, Tórshavn, Faroe Islands	Northern Ireland	1–1	1–3	UEFA Euro 2016 qualification
5	28 March 2016	Estadio Municipal de Marbella, Marbella, Spain	Liechtenstein	2–0	3–2	Friendly
6	7 October 2016	Skonto Stadium, Riga, Latvia	Latvia	2–0	2–0	2018 FIFA World Cup qualification
7	7 September 2018	Tórsvøllur, Tórshavn, Faroe Islands	Malta	1–0	3–1	2018–19 UEFA Nations League D
8	25 September 2022	Tórsvøllur, Tórshavn, Faroe Islands	Turkey	2–0	2–1	2022–23 UEFA Nations League C

== See also ==
- List of men's footballers with 100 or more international caps
