= Patrick Weihrauch =

German footballer (born 1994)

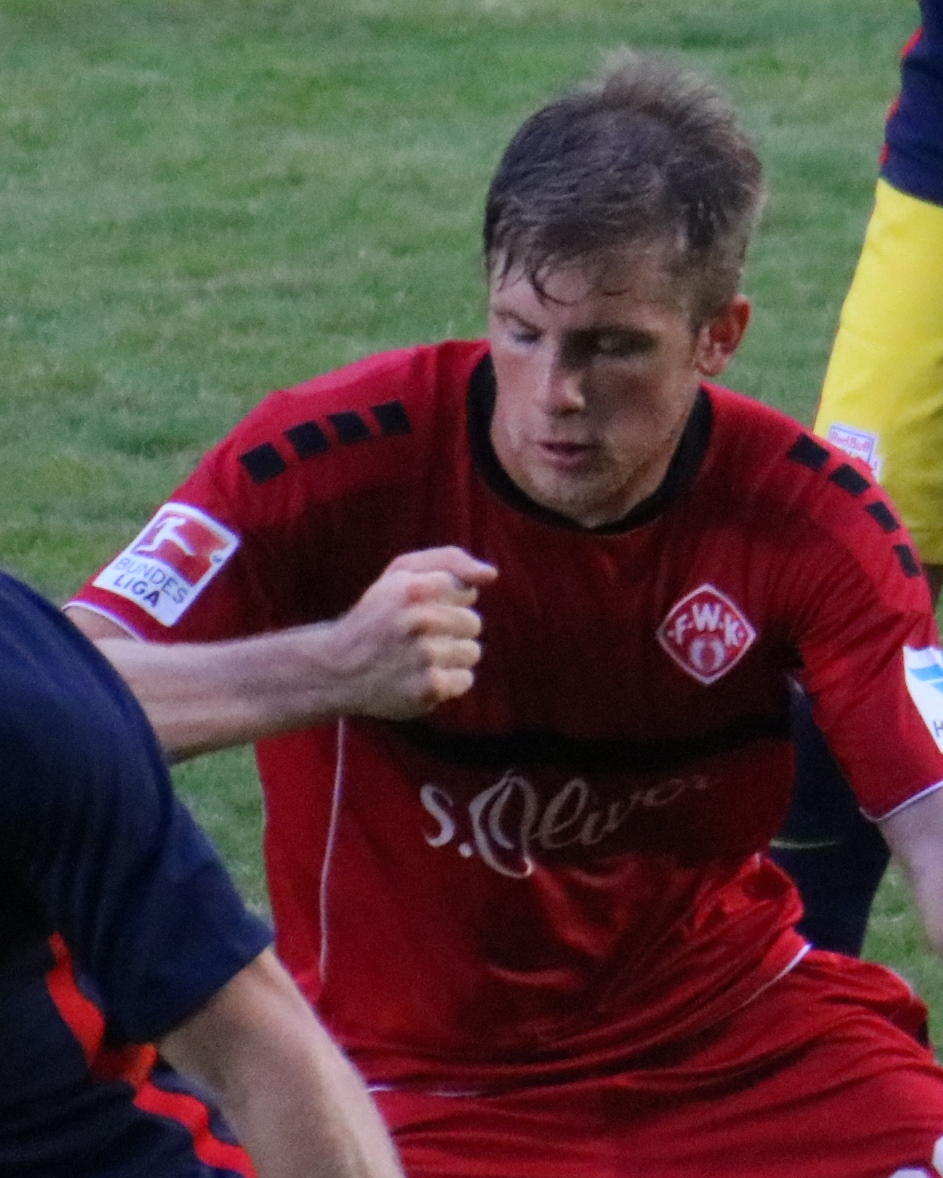
- Weihrauch in 2016

Personal information
- Date of birth: 3 March 1994 (age 32)
- Place of birth: Gräfelfing, Germany
- Height: 1.81 m (5 ft 11 in)
- Position: Winger

Team information
- Current team: FC Pipinsried
- Number: 7

Youth career
- 2006–2007: SC Fürstenfeldbruck
- 2007–2010: 1860 Munich
- 2010–2012: Bayern Munich

Senior career*
Years	Team	Apps	(Gls)
2012–2016	Bayern Munich II	117	(33)
2012–2016	Bayern Munich	0	(0)
2016–2017	Würzburger Kickers	20	(2)
2017–2020	Arminia Bielefeld	62	(4)
2020–2023	Dynamo Dresden	45	(5)
2023–2025	FC Homburg	53	(4)
2025–2026	Carl Zeiss Jena	30	(1)
2026–	FC Pipinsried	11	(1)

International career^{‡}
2008–2009	Germany U15	2	(2)
2009–2010	Germany U16	8	(4)
2010–2011	Germany U17	8	(1)
2011–2012	Germany U18	4	(1)
2012–2013	Germany U19	5	(1)
- * Club domestic league appearances and goals as of 27 September 2026 ‡ National team caps and goals as of 14:17, 29 August 2016 (UTC)

Patrick Weihrauch (born 3 March 1994) is a German professional footballer who plays as a winger for FC Pipinsried. He previously played for the reserve team of Bayern Munich, Würzburger Kickers, Arminia Bielefeld and Dynamo Dresden.

== Career ==
=== Early career ===
Born in Gräfelfing, Germany, his youth career included SC Fürstenfeldbruck from 1 July 2006 to 30 June 2007, the youth academy for 1860 Munich from 1 July 2007 to 30 June 2010, and the youth academy for Bayern Munich from 1 July 2010 to 30 June 2012. In the 2011–12 season, in the Regionalliga Süd, he made two appearances for Bayern Munich II against the reserve teams of FSV Frankfurt and Ingolstadt 04. He then scored eight goals in 34 matches in the 2012–13 season in the Regionalliga Bayern. He also went on to score seven goals in 24 matches in the 2013–14 season. Bayern Munich II qualified for the promotion playoff where he made two appearances. He managed four goals in 26 matches for the 2014–15 season. During the 2015–16 season, he scored 14 goals in 31 matches. He was part of the first team squad for Bayern Munich but did not make any first team appearances.

=== Würzburger Kickers ===
On 2 June 2016, Weihrauch signed a four–year contract for Würzburger Kickers. On 14 August 2016, Weihrauch came on as a substitute in the 33rd minute of Würzburg's 1–1 draw against 1. FC Kaiserslautern on matchday two of the 2016–17 2. Bundesliga season. This was his first appearance of the season. His first start for Würzburger Kickers was on 19 August 2016 in a 1–0 win against Eintracht Braunschweig in the first round of the German Cup.

=== Arminia Bielefeld ===
On 9 June 2017, it was announced that Weihrauch signed with 2. Bundesliga club Arminia Bielefeld on a contract until 2020. He arrived on a free transfer, after his Würzburg contract had been invalidated by the club's relegation. He finished the 2017–18 season with three goals in 33 appearances.

=== Dynamo Dresden ===
In the summer of 2020, Weihrauch joined 3. Liga side Dynamo Dresden on a free transfer, signing a two-year contract.

=== Homburg ===
On 24 August 2023, Weihrauch signed a one-year contract with FC Homburg.

=== Carl Zeiss Jena ===
On 24 June 2025, Weihrauch signed a contract with FC Carl Zeiss Jena.

== Career statistics ==
As of match played 19 September 2020

Appearances and goals by club, season and competition
Club	Season	League			DFB-Pokal		Other		Total	
Club	Season	Division	Apps	Goals	Apps	Goals	Apps	Goals	Apps	Goals
Bayern Munich II	2011–12	Regionalliga Süd	2	0	—		0	0	2	0
Bayern Munich II	2012–13	Regionalliga Bayern	34	8	—		0	0	34	8
Bayern Munich II	2013–14	Regionalliga Bayern	24	7	—		2 (Note: Appearances in 3. Liga relegation play-offs)	0	26	7
Bayern Munich II	2014–15	Regionalliga Bayern	26	4	—		0	0	26	4
Bayern Munich II	2015–16	Regionalliga Bayern	31	14	—		0	0	31	14
Bayern Munich II	Total		117	33	0	0	2	0	119	33
Würzburger Kickers	2016–17	2. Bundesliga	20	2	2	0	0	0	22	2
Arminia Bielefeld	2017–18	2. Bundesliga	32	3	1	0	0	0	33	3
Arminia Bielefeld	2018–19	2. Bundesliga	25	1	1	0	0	0	26	1
Arminia Bielefeld	2019–20	2. Bundesliga	5	0	0	0	0	0	5	0
Arminia Bielefeld	Total		62	4	2	0	0	0	64	4
Dynamo Dresden	2020–21	3. Liga	1	0	1	0	0	0	2	0
Career total			200	39	5	0	2	0	207	39
