= Andreas Voglsammer =

German professional footballer (born 1992)

Personal information
- Full name: Andreas Voglsammer
- Date of birth: 9 January 1992 (age 34)
- Place of birth: Rosenheim, Germany
- Height: 1.77 m (5 ft 10 in)
- Position: Forward

Team information
- Current team: Hansa Rostock
- Number: 9

Youth career
- 2001–2003: TSV Haag
- 2003–2005: TSV Dorfen
- 2005–2008: 1860 Rosenheim
- 2008–2010: Bayern Munich

Senior career*
Years	Team	Apps	(Gls)
2010–2011	Karlsruher SC	1	(0)
2011–2012	1860 Rosenheim	32	(12)
2012–2015	SpVgg Unterhaching	95	(21)
2015–2016	1. FC Heidenheim	24	(0)
2016–2021	Arminia Bielefeld	156	(48)
2021–2022	Union Berlin	32	(2)
2022–2023	Millwall	43	(3)
2023–2025	Hannover 96	56	(11)
2025–	Hansa Rostock	30	(7)

International career^{‡}
2008	Germany U16	2	(0)
2010	Germany U18	3	(0)
- * Club domestic league appearances and goals as of 28 May 2026 ‡ National team caps and goals as of 25 January 2017

Andreas Voglsammer (born 9 January 1992) is a German professional footballer who plays as a forward for 3. Liga club Hansa Rostock.

== Club career ==
After playing in Bayern Munich's youth team, Voglsammer signed for Karlsruher SC in 2010, and made one 2. Bundesliga appearance for the club, as a substitute for Aleksandr Iashvili in a 2–0 defeat to VfL Bochum in October 2010. He left KSC at the end of the season, to sign for his hometown club, TSV 1860 Rosenheim, of fifth tier Bayernliga. After a fairly successful season there, he signed for 3. Liga side SpVgg Unterhaching in July 2012.

In January 2015, half a year before his contract with Unterhaching would have expired, he moved to 2. Bundesliga club 1. FC Heidenheim, signing until 2017. The transfer fee was believed to be about €200,000.

He was released on 19 January 2016 and moved to Arminia Bielefeld. In 2021, Voglsammer joined Union Berlin.

On 12 August 2022, Voglsammer signed for EFL Championship club Millwall for an undisclosed fee. He scored his first goal for the club in a 2-0 win over Watford on 26 December 2022.

On 31 August 2023, Voglsammer left Millwall by mutual consent. He joined Hannover 96 on a free transfer.

Voglsammer joined Hansa Rostock ahead of the 2025–26 season.

== International career ==
During April 2010 he earned three caps for Germany U-18, coming on as a substitute in all matches.

== Career statistics ==
As of matches played on 18 May 2025

Appearances and goals by club, season and competition
Club	Season	League			National Cup		League Cup		Europe		Total	
Club	Season	Division	Apps	Goals	Apps	Goals	Apps	Goals	Apps	Goals	Apps	Goals
Karlsruher SC	2010–11	2. Bundesliga	1	0	0	0	—		—		1	0
SpVgg Unterhaching	2012–13	3. Liga	38	6	1	1	—		—		39	7
SpVgg Unterhaching	2013–14	3. Liga	35	10	—		—		—		35	10
SpVgg Unterhaching	2014–15	3. Liga	22	6	—		—		—		22	6
SpVgg Unterhaching	Total		95	16	1	1	—		—		96	17
1. FC Heidenheim	2014–15	2. Bundesliga	11	0	0	0	—		—		11	0
1. FC Heidenheim	2015–16	2. Bundesliga	13	0	1	0	—		—		14	0
1. FC Heidenheim	Total		24	0	1	0	—		—		25	0
Arminia Bielefeld	2015–16	2. Bundesliga	9	0	0	0	—		—		9	0
Arminia Bielefeld	2016–17	2. Bundesliga	32	8	3	0	—		—		35	8
Arminia Bielefeld	2017–18	2. Bundesliga	34	13	1	0	—		—		35	13
Arminia Bielefeld	2018–19	2. Bundesliga	34	13	1	0	—		—		35	13
Arminia Bielefeld	2019–20	2. Bundesliga	29	12	2	1	—		—		31	13
Arminia Bielefeld	2020–21	Bundesliga	18	2	0	0	—		—		18	2
Arminia Bielefeld	Total		156	48	7	1	—		—		163	49
Union Berlin	2021–22	Bundesliga	32	2	5	2	—		8 (Note: Appearance in the UEFA Europa Conference League.)	2	45	6
Union Berlin	2022–23	Bundesliga	0	0	1	0	—		—		1	0
Union Berlin	Total		32	2	6	2	—		8	2	46	6
Millwall	2022–23	Championship	41	3	1	0	0	0	—		42	3
Millwall	2023–24	Championship	2	0	0	0	1	0	—		3	0
Millwall	Total		43	3	1	0	1	0	—		45	3
Hannover 96	2023–24	2. Bundesliga	27	8	0	0	—		—		27	8
Hannover 96	2024–25	2. Bundesliga	29	3	1	0	—		—		30	3
Hannover 96	Total		56	11	1	0	—		—		57	11
Hansa Rostock	2025–26	3. Liga	0	0	0	0	—		—		0	0
Career total			407	80	17	4	1	0	8	2	433	86

== Honours ==
Arminia Bielefeld

- 2. Bundesliga Champions: 2019–20
