= Cebio Soukou =

German-born Beninese footballer (born 1992)

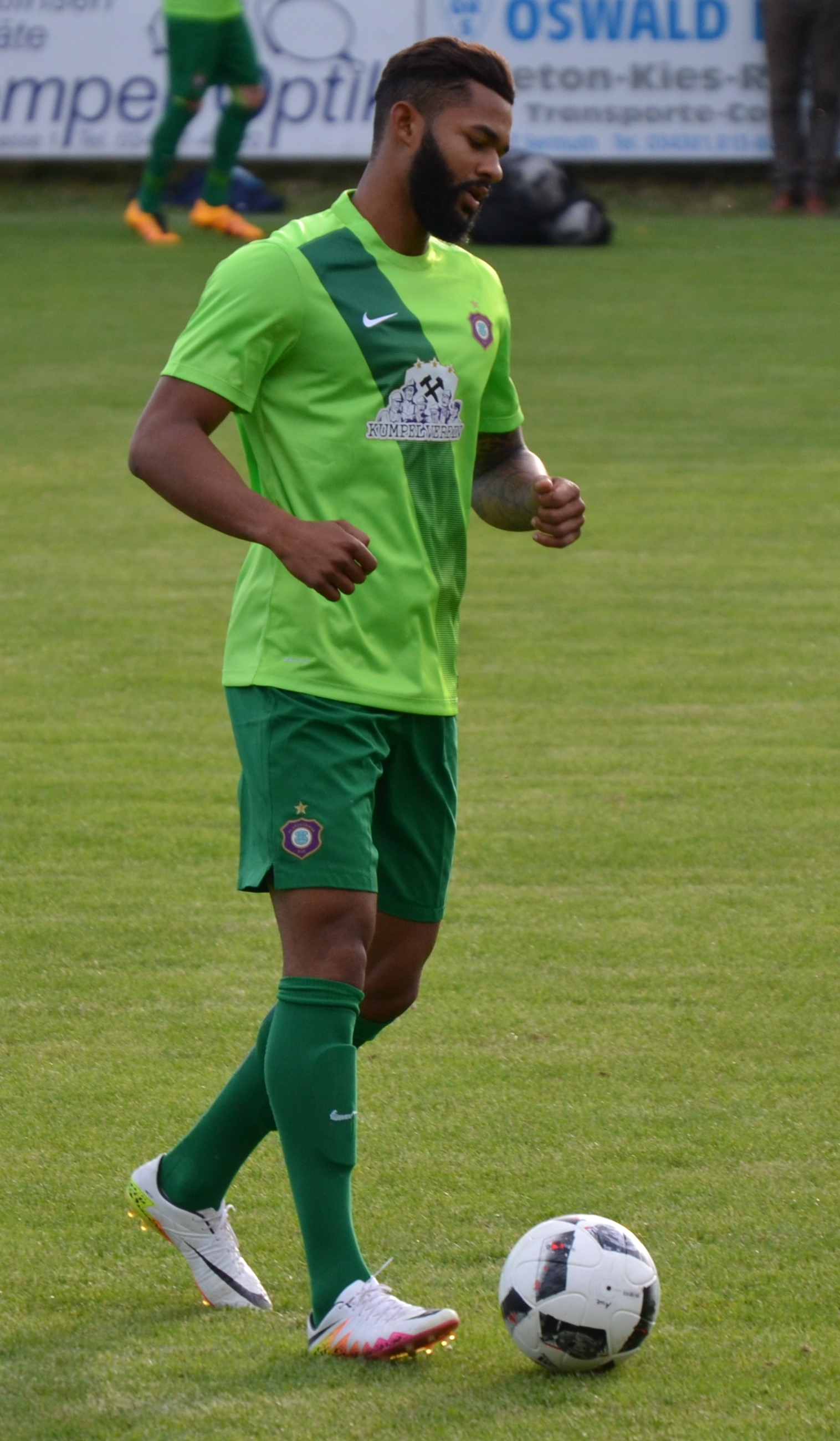
- Soukou playing for Erzgebirge Aue in 2016

Personal information
- Full name: Cebio Soukou
- Date of birth: 2 October 1992 (age 34)
- Place of birth: Bochum, Germany
- Height: 1.85 m (6 ft 1 in)
- Position: Midfielder

Team information
- Current team: Ümraniyespor
- Number: 27

Youth career
- 1998–2008: TuS Querenburg
- 2008–2011: VfL Bochum

Senior career*
| Years | Team | Apps | (Gls) |
| 2011–2012 | VfL Bochum II | 11 | (0) |
| 2012–2015 | Rot-Weiss Essen | 56 | (11) |
| 2016–2018 | Erzgebirge Aue | 58 | (8) |
| 2018–2019 | Hansa Rostock | 33 | (10) |
| 2019–2021 | Arminia Bielefeld | 45 | (6) |
| 2021–2023 | SV Sandhausen | 40 | (5) |
| 2023–2024 | Bandırmaspor | 42 | (7) |
| 2024– | Ümraniyespor | 56 | (9) |

International career^{‡}
| 2019– | Benin | 21 | (4) |
- * Club domestic league appearances and goals as of 6 May 2026 ‡ National team caps and goals as of 8 June 2022

Cebio Soukou (born 2 October 1992) is a professional footballer who plays as a midfielder for TFF First League club Ümraniyespor. Born in Germany, he plays for the Benin national team internationally.

Soukou started his career at VfL Bochum II, making his debut in the Regionalliga West in 2011. He signed for fellow Regionalliga West side Rot-Weiss Essen in summer 2012, before signing for Erzgebirge Aue of the 3. Liga in January 2016. Soukou was promoted to the 2. Bundesliga with Erzgebirge Aue at the end of the 2015–16 season, but returned to the 3. Liga in summer 2018 after signing for Hansa Rostock. After one season at Hansa Rostock, he signed for Arminia Bielefeld of the 2. Bundesliga. He was promoted to the Bundesliga with Arminia Bielefeld after the club finished the 2019–20 season as 2. Bundesliga champions. He scored Bielefeld's first goal of their return to the Bundesliga, but was released by the club at the end of the season and signed for SV Sandhausen of the 2. Bundesliga.

Soukou made his international debut for Benin in March 2019. He represented Benin at the 2019 Africa Cup of Nations, playing in all five of their matches as they reached the quarter-finals.

== Early life ==
Soukou was born and raised in Bochum to a Beninese father and a German mother.

== Club career ==
=== VfL Bochum ===
After playing youth football for TuS Querenburg (1998–2008), Soukou joined VfL Bochum's academy in 2008. He started his senior career with VfL Bochum II in 2011, making his debut on 20 August 2011 as a substitute in a 0–0 Regionalliga West draw with 1. FC Köln II. Soukou received the first red card of his career on 31 August 2011 in a 3–3 draw with TuS Koblenz for violent conduct. He made 11 appearances for Bochum II across the 2011–12 season.

=== Rot-Weiss Essen ===
In June 2012, Soukou signed for Regionalliga West club Rot-Weiss Essen on a one-year deal with the option for a second season. He made his debut for the club on 25 August 2012 in a 3–1 defeat to Fortuna Köln and scored his first goal for the club on 8 December 2012 in a 2–1 win over Rot-Weiß Oberhausen. He scored 4 goals in 25 appearances across the 2012–13 season. In August 2013, shortly before the start of the 2013–14 season, Soukou suffered a torn cruciate ligament in a pre-season friendly against Werder Bremen and did not return to playing until pre-season for the following campaign. He appeared in 18 of the club's 19 matches in the first half of the season, scoring 4 goals, but he tested positive for the banned substance methylhexanamine on 6 December 2014 after the 1–1 draw against Sportfreunde Lotte, with Soukou suspended in January 2015 until 29 May and Rot-Weiss Essen's point from the match against Sportfreunde Lotte deducted from them. The 2015–16 season saw Soukou make 13 appearances in the league for Essen without scoring, whilst he made his first appearance in the DFB-Pokal as Essen lost 3–1 to Fortuna Düsseldorf in the first round on 13 August 2015.

=== Erzgebirge Aue ===
On 30 December 2015, it was announced that Soukou had signed for 3. Liga side Erzgebirge Aue on a contract until the end of June 2018, with the transfer going at the start of the following month. He made his debut for the club on 22 January 2016 in a 1–1 draw with Stuttgarter Kickers, and scored his first goal for the club on 5 February 2016 with a 60th minute lob over the goalkeeper in a 2–0 win over VfR Aalen. He scored twice in 16 appearances for Aue across the 2015–16 season as they were promoted to the 2. Bundesliga with a second-placed 3. Liga finish. He made his 2. Bundesliga debut in a 1–1 draw with 1. FC Heidenheim in the opening game of the season, and scored his first second-tier goal on 28 October 2016 in a 6–2 defeat to 1860 Munich. He scored twice in 28 appearances in his debut 2. Bundesliga season. He scored 4 goals in 14 matches for Erzgebirge Aue across the 2017–18 season.

=== Hansa Rostock ===
In May 2018, it was announced that Soukou had signed for 3. Liga side Hansa Rostock on a one-year contract with the option of a further year. He debuted for the club in a 3–0 defeat to Energie Cottbus on 29 July 2018 and scored a brace for the club in his second appearance, a 2–0 win over Eintracht Braunschweig on 3 August. He scored 11 goals in 34 appearances across the 2018–19 season.

=== Arminia Bielefeld ===
In June 2019, it was announced Soukou would join 2. Bundesliga side Arminia Bielefeld on a two-year contract on a free transfer for the 2019–20 season. He made his debut for the club on 29 July 2019 in a 1–1 draw with FC St. Pauli, and scored his first goal for the club in a 5–2 win over Wehen Wiesbaden on 21 September 2019. He scored 6 goals in 32 appearances across the 2019–20 season as Bielefeld finished top of the 2. Bundesliga and were promoted to the Bundesliga. Soukou scored Bielefeld's first goal of their return to the Bundesliga with the opening goal of a 1–1 draw with Eintracht Frankfurt. His goal against Eintracht Frankfurt remained his only goal of the season as he played another 13 league matches without scoring. He left the club at the end of the 2020–21 season following the expiry of his contract.

=== SV Sandhausen ===
Soukou signed for 2. Bundesliga side SV Sandhausen in summer 2021 following the expiry of his contract at Arminia Bielefeld.

== International career ==
Born in Germany to a Beninese father, Soukou is eligible to represent both Germany and Benin internationally. He was called up to the Benin national team for the first time in November 2018 for an Africa Cup of Nations qualifier against Gambia on 17 November, but was injured and unable to play in that match.

He made his debut for Benin on 24 March 2019 in an Africa Cup of Nations qualifier against Togo, as a starter, with Soukou providing an assist in a 2–1 victory which qualified Benin for the 2019 Africa Cup of Nations. He was part of Benin's squad for the 2019 Africa Cup of Nations, where Benin were drawn into Group F alongside Cameroon, Ghana and Guinea-Bissau. He played in all 5 of Benin's matches at the competition as they reached the quarter-finals before being eliminated by Senegal. He scored his first goal for Benin on 11 October 2020 with the opening goal of a 2–0 friendly win over Gabon.

== Career statistics ==
=== International ===
As of match played 15 June 2021

Appearances and goals by national team and year
| National team | Year | Apps | Goals |
|---|---|---|---|
| Benin | 2019 | 11 | 0 |
| Benin | 2020 | 1 | 1 |
| Benin | 2021 | 3 | 1 |
| Total | | 15 | 2 |

As of match played 15 June 2021. Benin score listed first, score column indicates score after each Benin goal.

List of international goals scored by Cebio Soukou
| No. | Date | Venue | Opponent | Score | Result | Competition | Ref. |
|---|---|---|---|---|---|---|---|
| 1 | 11 October 2020 | Estádio Pina Manique, Lisbon, Portugal | Gabon | 1–0 | 2–0 | Friendly | |
| 2 | 8 June 2021 | Stade de l'Amitié, Cotonou, Benin | Zambia | 1–0 | 2–2 | Friendly | |
