= Anderson Lucoqui =

Angolan footballer (born 1997)

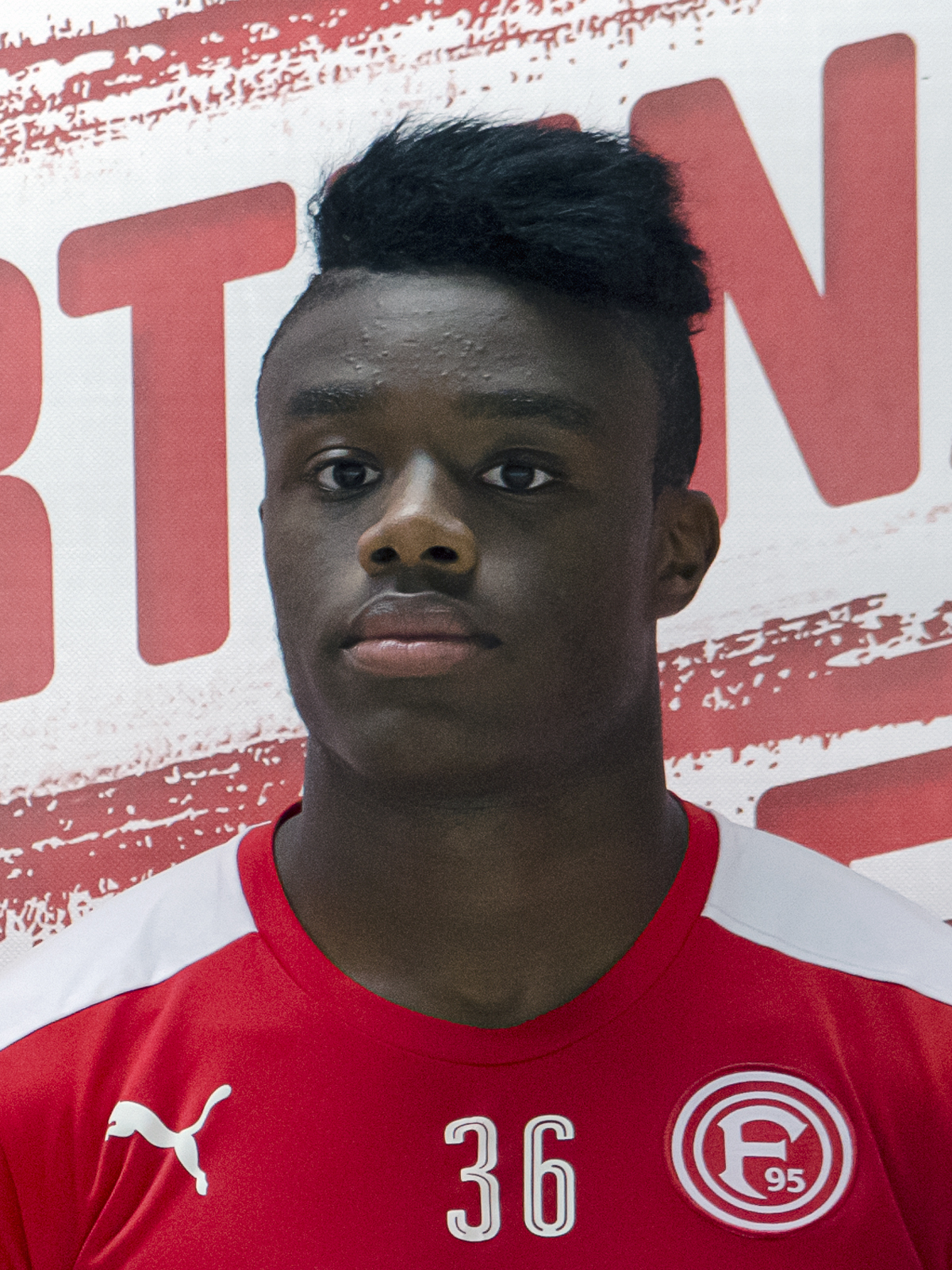
- Lucoqui with Fortuna Düsseldorf in 2016

Personal information
- Full name: Anderson-Lenda Lucoqui
- Date of birth: 6 July 1997 (age 29)
- Place of birth: Zweibrücken, Germany
- Height: 1.80 m (5 ft 11 in)
- Position: Defender

Team information
- Current team: Energie Cottbus
- Number: 24

Youth career
- –2004: SSV Lützenkirchen
- 2004–2011: Bayer Leverkusen
- 2011–2014: 1. FC Köln
- 2014–2016: Fortuna Düsseldorf

Senior career*
Years	Team	Apps	(Gls)
2016–2018	Fortuna Düsseldorf II	42	(1)
2016–2018	Fortuna Düsseldorf	3	(0)
2018–2021	Arminia Bielefeld	42	(0)
2021–2023	Mainz 05	13	(1)
2022–2023	→ Hansa Rostock (loan)	15	(0)
2023–2024	Hertha BSC	1	(0)
2023–2024	Hertha BSC II	4	(0)
2024–2025	Eintracht Braunschweig	10	(0)
2025	1860 Munich	12	(0)
2025–	Energie Cottbus	25	(1)

International career^{‡}
2016–2018	Germany U20	6	(0)
2020–	Angola	1	(0)
- * Club domestic league appearances and goals as of 28 May 2026 ‡ National team caps and goals as of 13 October 2020

Anderson-Lenda Lucoqui (born 6 July 1997) is a professional footballer who plays as a defender for 2. Bundesliga club Energie Cottbus. Born in Germany, he plays for the Angola national team.

== Club career ==
In August 2018, Lucoqui transferred to Arminia Bielefeld for an undisclosed fee. He was part of the Bielefeld team that earned promotion to the Bundesliga in the 2019–20 season. In May 2021, he declined an extension offer for his contract with Arminia Bielefeld and signed a three-year deal with 1. FSV Mainz 05.

On 1 September 2022, he joined Hansa Rostock on loan until the end of the season.

On 25 July 2023, Lucoqui signed a one-year contract with Hertha BSC in 2. Bundesliga.

On 1 February 2024, Lucoqui moved to Eintracht Braunschweig and signed a contract until 30 June 2025.

On 3 February 2025, Lucoqui joined 1860 Munich in 3. Liga.

On 1 September 2025, Lucoqui joined FC Energie Cottbus.

== International career ==
Lucoqui was born in Zweibrücken, Germany and is of Angolan descent. He was raised in Leverkusen and has been a youth international for Germany.

On 22 September 2020, Lucoqui was called up by the senior Angola national football team. He made his debut on 13 October 2020 as a 78th minute substitution during a friendly match against Mozambique.

== Personal life ==
Outside of football, Lucoqui is a musician and has released music under the moniker "LUCO".

== Career statistics ==
As of matches played on 11 July 2019.

Club	Season	League			Cup		Total	
Club	Season	Division	Apps	Goals	Apps	Goals	Apps	Goals
Fortuna Düsseldorf	2016–17	2. Bundesliga	3	0	0	0	3	0
Fortuna Düsseldorf	2017–18	2. Bundesliga	0	0	1	0	1	0
Fortuna Düsseldorf	Totals		3	0	1	0	4	0
Fortuna Düsseldorf II	2016–17	Regionalliga West	20	0	—		20	0
Fortuna Düsseldorf II	2017–18	Regionalliga West	22	1	—		22	1
Fortuna Düsseldorf II	Totals		42	1	—		42	1
Arminia Bielefeld	2018–19	2. Bundesliga	17	0	0	0	17	0
Career totals			62	1	1	0	63	1
