= Keanu Staude =

German footballer

Personal information
- Date of birth: 26 January 1997 (age 29)
- Place of birth: Bielefeld, Germany
- Height: 1.76 m (5 ft 9 in)
- Position: Midfielder

Team information
- Current team: Kickers Offenbach
- Number: 11

Youth career
- 2002–2005: FTuS Ost Bielefeld
- 2005–2016: Arminia Bielefeld

Senior career*
Years	Team	Apps	(Gls)
2016–2020	Arminia Bielefeld	83	(6)
2020	Würzburger Kickers	3	(0)
2021–2022	1860 Munich	22	(1)
2023–	Kickers Offenbach	58	(10)

International career^{‡}
2016–2017	Germany U20	2	(0)
- * Club domestic league appearances and goals as of 24 September 2026 ‡ National team caps and goals as of 21:36, 3 December 2020 (UTC)

Keanu Staude (born 26 January 1997) is a German professional footballer who plays as a midfielder for Kickers Offenbach in Regionalliga Südwest.

== Club career ==
Staude started playing football at FTuS Ost Bielefeld at the age of five and joined Arminia Bielefeld's youth department in 2005. As a 13-year-old, he completed a trial practice at Bayern Munich. For the Arminia U17 team he made 24 appearances in the Under 17 Bundesliga and scored seven goals. He then moved to the U19 side of Arminia, but could not prevent their relegation as bottom of the table from the Under 19 Bundesliga.

On 15 May 2016, Staude made his professional debut for Arminia Bielefeld in the 2. Bundesliga. He came on as a substitute for David Ulm in the last matchday at Karlsruher SC and a provided an assist a few minutes after coming on for the equaliser from Christopher Nöthe. Staude then caused a stir with his two goals in the last two matches of the 2016–17 season. He was also able to build on this performance in the following season. In the meantime he succeeded in asserting himself as an integral part of the squad. On 20 April 2018, Staude made his 50th 2. Bundesliga appearance for Arminia.

On 9 August 2020, after his contract with Arminia had expired as the club had won promotion to the Bundesliga, Staude signed a one-year contract with an option of an extra season with recently promoted 2. Bundesliga club Würzburger Kickers. On 2 January 2021, Staude was released by Würzburger Kickers.

== International career ==
Staude debuted for the Germany U20s in a 1–0 friendly loss to the Italy U20s on 1 September 2016.

== Career statistics ==
As of match played 18 October 2020

Appearances and goals by club, season and competition
Club	Season	League			DFB-Pokal		Other		Total	
Club	Season	Division	Apps	Goals	Apps	Goals	Apps	Goals	Apps	Goals
Arminia Bielefeld	2015–16	2. Bundesliga	1	0	0	0	—		1	0
Arminia Bielefeld	2016–17	2. Bundesliga	23	2	1	0	—		24	3
Arminia Bielefeld	2017–18	2. Bundesliga	28	2	1	0	—		29	2
Arminia Bielefeld	2018–19	2. Bundesliga	26	2	1	0	—		27	2
Arminia Bielefeld	2019–20	2. Bundesliga	5	0	0	0	—		5	0
Arminia Bielefeld	Total		83	6	3	0	0	0	86	6
Würzburger Kickers	2020–21	2. Bundesliga	3	0	1	0	—		4	0
Career total			86	7	3	0	0	0	90	6

== Honours ==
Arminia Bielefeld

- 2. Bundesliga: 2019–20
