= 2017–18 Hertha BSC season =

Hertha BSC
2017–18 season
- President: Werner Gegenbauer
- Sporting director: Michael Preetz
- Manager: Pál Dárdai
- Stadium: Olympiastadion Berlin
- Bundesliga: 10th
- DFB-Pokal: Second round
- Europa League: Group stage
- Top goalscorer: League: Salomon Kalou (12 goals); All: Davie Selke (14 goals)
- Biggest win: Frankfurt 0–3 Hertha
- Biggest defeat: Hertha 2–6 Leipzig
| Home colours | Away colours | Third colours |

The 2017–18 Hertha BSC season was the 126th season in the football club's history and 5th consecutive and 35th overall season in the top flight of German football, the Bundesliga, having been promoted from the 2. Bundesliga in 2013. In addition to the domestic league, Hertha BSC also participated in this season's editions of the domestic cup, the DFB-Pokal, and the second-tier continental cup, the UEFA Europa League. This was the 50th season for Hertha in the Olympiastadion Berlin, located in Berlin, Germany. The season covered a period from 1 July 2017 to 30 June 2018.

== Players ==
=== Squad information ===
As of 31 January 2018

Note: Flags indicate national team as defined under FIFA eligibility rules; some limited exceptions apply. Players may hold more than one non-FIFA nationality.

| No. | Pos. | Nation | Player |
|---|---|---|---|
| 1 | GK | GER | Thomas Kraft |
| 2 | DF | SVK | Peter Pekarík (Vice-captain) |
| 3 | MF | NOR | Per Ciljan Skjelbred |
| 4 | DF | NED | Karim Rekik |
| 5 | DF | GER | Niklas Stark |
| 6 | MF | CZE | Vladimír Darida |
| 7 | MF | GER | Alexander Esswein |
| 8 | FW | CIV | Salomon Kalou |
| 10 | MF | SVK | Ondrej Duda |
| 11 | FW | AUS | Mathew Leckie |
| 16 | FW | GER | Julian Schieber |
| 17 | DF | GER | Maximilian Mittelstädt |
| 18 | MF | GER | Sinan Kurt |

| No. | Pos. | Nation | Player |
|---|---|---|---|
| 19 | FW | BIH | Vedad Ibišević (captain) |
| 20 | MF | AUT | Valentino Lazaro |
| 21 | DF | GER | Marvin Plattenhardt |
| 22 | GK | NOR | Rune Jarstein |
| 23 | DF | GER | Mitchell Weiser |
| 25 | DF | GER | Jordan Torunarigha |
| 26 | MF | GER | Arne Maier |
| 27 | FW | GER | Davie Selke |
| 28 | DF | SUI | Fabian Lustenberger |
| 29 | DF | GER | Florian Baak |
| 30 | MF | GER | Julius Kade |
| 32 | MF | GER | Palkó Dárdai |
| 33 | GK | USA | Jonathan Klinsmann |

== Competitions ==
Win Draw Loss

=== Overview ===
| Competition | First match | Last match | Starting round | Final position | Record | | | | | | | |
| Competition | First match | Last match | Starting round | Final position | Pld | W | D | L | GF | GA | GD | Win % |
|---|---|---|---|---|---|---|---|---|---|---|---|---|
| Bundesliga | 19 August 2017 | 12 May 2018 | Matchday 1 | 10th | 34 | 10 | 13 | 11 | 43 | 46 | −3 | 29.41 |
| DFB-Pokal | 14 August 2017 | 25 October 2017 | First round | Second round | 2 | 1 | 0 | 1 | 3 | 3 | +0 | 50.00 |
| Europa League | 14 September 2017 | 7 December 2017 | Group stage | Group stage | 6 | 1 | 2 | 3 | 6 | 7 | −1 | 16.67 |
| Total | | | | | 42 | 12 | 15 | 15 | 52 | 56 | −4 | 28.57 |

Last updated: 21 May 2018
Source: Competitions

=== Bundesliga ===
==== League table ====
| Pos | Team | Pld | W | D | L | GF | GA | GD | Pts | Qualification or relegation |
|---|---|---|---|---|---|---|---|---|---|---|
| 8 | Eintracht Frankfurt | 34 | 14 | 7 | 13 | 45 | 45 | 0 | 49 | Qualification for the Europa League group stage (Note: Eintracht Frankfurt qualified for the Europa League group stage by winning the 2017–18 DFB-Pokal.) |
| 9 | Borussia Mönchengladbach | 34 | 13 | 8 | 13 | 47 | 52 | −5 | 47 | |
| 10 | Hertha BSC | 34 | 10 | 13 | 11 | 43 | 46 | −3 | 43 | |
| 11 | Werder Bremen | 34 | 10 | 12 | 12 | 37 | 40 | −3 | 42 | |
| 12 | FC Augsburg | 34 | 10 | 11 | 13 | 43 | 46 | −3 | 41 | |

Source: DFB
Rules for classification: 1) Points; 2) Goal difference; 3) Goals scored; 4) Head-to-head results; 5) Head-to-head away goals scored; 6) Away goals scored; 7) Play-off.

==== Results summary ====
| Overall | | | | | | | | Home | | | | | | Away | | | | | |
| Pld | W | D | L | GF | GA | GD | Pts | W | D | L | GF | GA | GD | W | D | L | GF | GA | GD |
|---|---|---|---|---|---|---|---|---|---|---|---|---|---|---|---|---|---|---|---|
| 34 | 10 | 13 | 11 | 43 | 46 | −3 | 43 | 5 | 7 | 5 | 23 | 27 | −4 | 5 | 6 | 6 | 20 | 19 | +1 |

Last updated: 21 May 2018.
Source: Bundesliga

==== Results by round ====
| Round | 1 | 2 | 3 | 4 | 5 | 6 | 7 | 8 | 9 | 10 | 11 | 12 | 13 | 14 | 15 | 16 | 17 | 18 | 19 | 20 | 21 | 22 | 23 | 24 | 25 | 26 | 27 | 28 | 29 | 30 | 31 | 32 | 33 | 34 |
|---|---|---|---|---|---|---|---|---|---|---|---|---|---|---|---|---|---|---|---|---|---|---|---|---|---|---|---|---|---|---|---|---|---|---|
| Ground | H | A | H | A | H | A | H | H | A | H | A | H | A | H | A | H | A | A | H | A | H | A | H | A | A | H | A | H | A | H | A | H | A | H |
| Result | W | L | D | D | W | L | D | L | D | W | D | L | W | L | D | W | W | L | D | D | D | W | L | D | L | D | W | D | L | W | W | D | L | L |
| Position | 3 | 9 | 9 | 11 | 8 | 8 | 10 | 13 | 11 | 11 | 11 | 14 | 11 | 12 | 12 | 11 | 10 | 11 | 11 | 11 | 11 | 11 | 11 | 11 | 12 | 11 | 11 | 11 | 10 | 9 | 9 | 10 | 10 | 10 |

Updated to match(es) played on 21 May 2018. Source: Bundesliga
A = Away; H = Home; W = Win; D = Draw; L = Loss

==== Matches ====
| 19 August 2017 1 | Hertha BSC | 2–0 | VfB Stuttgart | Berlin |
| 15:30 CEST (UTC+2) | Leckie 46', 62' | Report | | Stadium: Olympiastadion Berlin; Attendance: 44,751; Referee: Sascha Stegemann |

| 26 August 2017 2 | Borussia Dortmund | 2–0 | Hertha BSC | Dortmund |
| 18:30 CEST (UTC+2) | Aubameyang 15'; Şahin 57' | Report | | Stadium: Signal Iduna Park; Attendance: 80,860; Referee: Marco Fritz |

| 10 September 2017 3 | Hertha BSC | 1–1 | Werder Bremen | Berlin |
| 15:30 CEST (UTC+2) | Leckie 38' | Report | Delaney 59' | Stadium: Olympiastadion Berlin; Attendance: 49,118; Referee: Bibiana Steinhaus |

| 17 September 2017 4 | 1899 Hoffenheim | 1–1 | Hertha BSC | Sinsheim |
| 13:30 CEST (UTC+2) | Wagner 6' | Report | Esswein 55' | Stadium: Wirsol Rhein-Neckar-Arena; Attendance: 27,243; Referee: Markus Schmidt |

| 20 September 2017 5 | Hertha BSC | 2–1 | Bayer Leverkusen | Berlin |
| 20:30 CEST (UTC+2) | Leckie 16'; Kalou 24' | Report | Brandt 84' | Stadium: Olympiastadion Berlin; Attendance: 32,825; Referee: Deniz Aytekin |

| 23 September 2017 6 | Mainz 05 | 1–0 | Hertha BSC | Mainz |
| 15:30 CEST (UTC+2) | de Blasis 54' (pen.) | Report | | Stadium: Opel Arena; Attendance: 23,517; Referee: Tobias Stieler |

| 1 October 2017 7 | Hertha BSC | 2–2 | Bayern Munich | Berlin |
| 15:30 CEST (UTC+2) | Duda 51'; Kalou 56' | Report | Hummels 10'; Lewandowski 49' | Stadium: Olympiastadion Berlin; Attendance: 71,212; Referee: Harm Osmers |

| 14 October 2017 8 | Hertha BSC | 0–2 | Schalke 04 | Berlin |
| 15:30 CEST (UTC+2) | | Report | Goretzka 54' (pen.); Burgstaller 78' | Stadium: Olympiastadion Berlin; Attendance: 50,590; Referee: Benjamin Brand |

| 22 October 2017 9 | SC Freiburg | 1–1 | Hertha BSC | Freiburg |
| 15:30 CEST (UTC+2) | Haberer 52' (pen.) | Report | Kalou 81' (pen.) | Stadium: Schwarzwald-Stadion; Attendance: 23,800; Referee: Guido Winkmann |

| 28 October 2017 10 | Hertha BSC | 2–1 | Hamburger SV | Berlin |
| 15:30 CEST (UTC+2) | Stark 17'; Rekik 50' | Report | Arp 73' | Stadium: Olympiastadion Berlin; Attendance: 52,131; Referee: Felix Brych |

| 5 November 2017 11 | VfL Wolfsburg | 3–3 | Hertha BSC | Wolfsburg |
| 18:00 CET (UTC+1) | Mallı 41'; Gómez 44'; Origi 60' | Report | Ibišević 1'; Rekik 53'; Selke 83' | Stadium: Volkswagen Arena; Attendance: 25,214; Referee: Robert Kampka |

| 18 November 2017 12 | Hertha BSC | 2–4 | Borussia Mönchengladbach | Berlin |
| 18:30 CET (UTC+1) | Ibišević 28'; Weiser 71' | Report | Stindl 5'; Hazard 14' (pen.); Raffael 20', 77' | Stadium: Olympiastadion Berlin; Attendance: 48,304; Referee: Bastian Dankert |

| 26 November 2017 13 | 1. FC Köln | 0–2 | Hertha BSC | Cologne |
| 18:00 CET (UTC+1) | | Report | Ibišević 17', 64' (pen.) | Stadium: RheinEnergieStadion; Attendance: 47,800; Referee: Bibiana Steinhaus |

| 3 December 2017 14 | Hertha BSC | 1–2 | Eintracht Frankfurt | Berlin |
| 15:30 CET (UTC+1) | Selke 15' | Report | Wolf 26'; Boateng 80' | Stadium: Olympiastadion Berlin; Attendance: 38,781; Referee: Sören Storks |

| 10 December 2017 15 | FC Augsburg | 1–1 | Hertha BSC | Augsburg |
| 18:00 CET (UTC+1) | Caiuby 74' | Report | Kalou 90+1' | Stadium: WWK Arena; Attendance: 26,641; Referee: Martin Petersen |

| 13 December 2017 16 | Hertha BSC | 3–1 | Hannover 96 | Berlin |
| 20:30 CET (UTC+1) | Kalou 18', 45'; Torunarigha 83' | Report | Bebou 65' | Stadium: Olympiastadion Berlin; Attendance: 29,231; Referee: Robert Hartmann |

| 17 December 2017 17 | RB Leipzig | 2–3 | Hertha BSC | Leipzig |
| 18:00 CET (UTC+1) | Orbán 68'; Halstenberg 90+2' | Report | Selke 5', 51'; Kalou 31' | Stadium: Red Bull Arena; Attendance: 36,109; Referee: Frank Willenborg |

| 13 January 2018 18 | VfB Stuttgart | 1–0 | Hertha BSC | Stuttgart |
| 15:30 CET (UTC+1) | Stark 78' (o.g.) | Report | | Stadium: Mercedes-Benz Arena; Attendance: 57,181; Referee: Felix Brych |

| 19 January 2018 19 | Hertha BSC | 1–1 | Borussia Dortmund | Berlin |
| 20:30 CET (UTC+1) | Selke 46' | Report | Kagawa 71' | Stadium: Olympiastadion Berlin; Attendance: 65,893; Referee: Christian Dingert |

| 27 January 2018 20 | Werder Bremen | 0–0 | Hertha BSC | Bremen |
| 18:30 CET (UTC+1) | | Report | | Stadium: Weser-Stadion; Attendance: 40,030; Referee: Bastian Dankert |

| 3 February 2018 21 | Hertha BSC | 1–1 | 1899 Hoffenheim | Berlin |
| 15:30 CET (UTC+1) | Kalou 58' | Report | Kramarić 38' (pen.) | Stadium: Olympiastadion Berlin; Attendance: 32,598; Referee: Deniz Aytekin |

| 10 February 2018 22 | Bayer Leverkusen | 0–2 | Hertha BSC | Leverkusen |
| 15:30 CET (UTC+1) | | Report | Lazaro 43'; Kalou 58' | Stadium: BayArena; Attendance: 25,601; Referee: Patrick Ittrich |

| 16 February 2018 23 | Hertha BSC | 0–2 | Mainz 05 | Berlin |
| 20:30 CET (UTC+1) | | Report | Quaison 40', 65' | Stadium: Olympiastadion Berlin; Attendance: 30,908; Referee: Martin Petersen |

| 24 February 2018 24 | Bayern Munich | 0–0 | Hertha BSC | Munich |
| 15:30 CET (UTC+1) | | Report | | Stadium: Allianz Arena; Attendance: 75,000; Referee: Guido Winkmann |

| 3 March 2018 25 | Schalke 04 | 1–0 | Hertha BSC | Gelsenkirchen |
| 15:30 CET (UTC+1) | Pjaca 37' | Report | | Stadium: Veltins-Arena; Attendance: 61,578; Referee: Sascha Stegemann |

| 10 March 2018 26 | Hertha BSC | 0–0 | SC Freiburg | Berlin |
| 15:30 CET (UTC+1) | | Report | | Stadium: Olympiastadion Berlin; Attendance: 38,625; Referee: Sven Jablonski |

| 17 March 2018 27 | Hamburger SV | 1–2 | Hertha BSC | Hamburg |
| 15:30 CET (UTC+1) | Douglas Santos 25' | Report | Lazaro 56'; Kalou 63' | Stadium: Volksparkstadion; Attendance: 52,159; Referee: Robert Kampka |

| 31 March 2018 28 | Hertha BSC | 0–0 | VfL Wolfsburg | Berlin |
| 20:30 CEST (UTC+2) | | Report | | Stadium: Olympiastadion Berlin; Attendance: 34,765; Referee: Deniz Aytekin |

| 7 April 2018 29 | Borussia Mönchengladbach | 2–1 | Hertha BSC | Mönchengladbach |
| 15:30 CEST (UTC+2) | Hazard 75', 79' (pen.) | Report | Kalou 40' | Stadium: Borussia-Park; Attendance: 51,417; Referee: Bibiana Steinhaus |

| 14 April 2018 30 | Hertha BSC | 2–1 | 1. FC Köln | Berlin |
| 15:30 CEST (UTC+2) | Selke 49', 52' | Report | Bittencourt 29' | Stadium: Olympiastadion Berlin; Attendance: 49,253; Referee: Sören Storks |

| 21 April 2018 31 | Eintracht Frankfurt | 0–3 | Hertha BSC | Frankfurt |
| 15:30 CEST (UTC+2) | | Report | Selke 57' (pen.); Leckie 77'; Esswein 90+1' | Stadium: Commerzbank-Arena; Attendance: 51,000; Referee: Sascha Stegemann |

| 28 April 2018 32 | Hertha BSC | 2–2 | FC Augsburg | Berlin |
| 15:30 CEST (UTC+2) | Ibišević 84' (pen.); Selke 87' | Report | Gregoritsch 32'; Córdova 61' | Stadium: Olympiastadion Berlin; Attendance: 40,935; Referee: Marco Fritz |

| 5 May 2018 33 | Hannover 96 | 3–1 | Hertha BSC | Hanover |
| 15:30 CEST (UTC+2) | Harnik 4'; Sané 40'; Füllkrug 42' | Report | Selke 73' | Stadium: HDI-Arena; Attendance: 49,000; Referee: Sören Storks |

| 12 May 2018 34 | Hertha BSC | 2–6 | RB Leipzig | Berlin |
| 15:30 CEST (UTC+2) | Ibišević 4'; Kalou 64' | Report | Upamecano 2'; Lookman 8'; Augustin 22', 54'; Werner 49'; Bruma 82' | Stadium: Olympiastadion Berlin; Attendance: 60,502; Referee: Sven Jablonski |

=== DFB-Pokal ===
| 14 August 2017 First round | Hansa Rostock | 0–2 | Hertha BSC | Rostock |
| 20:45 CEST (UTC+2) | | Report | Weiser 86'; Ibišević 90+2' | Stadium: Ostseestadion; Attendance: 22,400; Referee: Robert Hartmann |

| 25 October 2017 Second round | Hertha BSC | 1–3 | 1. FC Köln | Berlin |
| 18:30 CEST (UTC+2) | Stark 69' | Report | Zoller 35'; Maroh 43'; Clemens 64' | Stadium: Olympiastadion; Attendance: 33,459; Referee: Marco Fritz |

=== UEFA Europa League ===
==== Group stage ====
| Pos | Team | Pld | W | D | L | GF | GA | GD | Pts | Qualification | ATH | OST | ZOR | HRT |
|---|---|---|---|---|---|---|---|---|---|---|---|---|---|---|
| 1 | (Spain) Athletic Bilbao | 6 | 3 | 2 | 1 | 8 | 5 | +3 | 11 (Note: Head-to-head results: Östersund 2–2 Athletic Bilbao, Athletic Bilbao 1–0 Östersund.) | Advance to knockout phase | — | 1–0 | 0–1 | 3–2 |
| 2 | (Sweden) Östersunds FK | 6 | 3 | 2 | 1 | 8 | 4 | +4 | 11 | Advance to knockout phase | 2–2 | — | 2–0 | 1–0 |
| 3 | (Ukraine) Zorya Luhansk | 6 | 2 | 0 | 4 | 3 | 9 | −6 | 6 | | 0–2 | 0–2 | — | 2–1 |
| 4 | (Germany) Hertha BSC | 6 | 1 | 2 | 3 | 6 | 7 | −1 | 5 | | 0–0 | 1–1 | 2–0 | — |

Source: UEFA
Rules for classification: Group stage tiebreakers
Notes:

| 14 September 2017 1 | Hertha BSC (Germany) | 0–0 | (Spain) Athletic Bilbao | Berlin, Germany |
| 21:05 CEST (UTC+2) | | Report | | Stadium: Olympiastadion Berlin; Attendance: 28,832; Referee: Ivan Kružliak (Slovakia) |

| 28 September 2017 2 | Östersund (Sweden) | 1–0 | (Germany) Hertha BSC | Östersund, Sweden |
| 19:00 CEST (UTC+2) | Nouri 22' (pen.) | Report | | Stadium: Jämtkraft Arena; Attendance: 8,009; Referee: Luca Banti (Italy) |

| 19 October 2017 3 | Zorya Luhansk (Ukraine) | 2–1 | (Germany) Hertha BSC | Lviv, Ukraine |
| 20:00 EEST (UTC+3); 19:00 CEST (UTC+2) | Silas 42'; Svatok 79' | Report | Selke 56' | Stadium: Arena Lviv; Attendance: 9,521; Referee: Liran Liany (Israel) |

| 2 November 2017 4 | Hertha BSC (Germany) | 2–0 | (Ukraine) Zorya Luhansk | Berlin, Germany |
| 21:05 CET (UTC+1) | Selke 16', 73' | Report | | Stadium: Olympiastadion Berlin; Attendance: 20,358; Referee: John Beaton (Scotland) |

| 23 November 2017 5 | Athletic Bilbao (Spain) | 3–2 | (Germany) Hertha BSC | Bilbao, Spain |
| 19:00 CET (UTC+1) | Aduriz 35' (pen.), 66' (pen.); Williams 82' | Report | Leckie 26'; Selke 36' | Stadium: San Mamés; Attendance: 38,928; Referee: Paolo Tagliavento (Italy) |

| 7 December 2017 6 | Hertha BSC (Germany) | 1–1 | (Sweden) Östersund | Berlin, Germany |
| 21:05 CET (UTC+1) | Pekarík 61' | Report | Papagiannopoulos 58' | Stadium: Olympiastadion Berlin; Attendance: 15,686; Referee: Tiago Martins (Portugal) |

== Statistics ==
=== Appearances and goals ===
| No. | Pos | Nat | Player | Total | | Bundesliga | | DFB-Pokal | | Europa League | |
| No. | Pos | Nat | Player | Apps | Goals | Apps | Goals | Apps | Goals | Apps | Goals |
Goalkeepers
| 1 | GK | (Germany) GER | Thomas Kraft | 7 | 0 | 3 | 0 | 0 | 0 | 4 | 0 |
| 22 | GK | (Norway) NOR | Rune Jarstein | 34 | 0 | 31 | 0 | 2 | 0 | 1 | 0 |
| 33 | GK | (United States) USA | Jonathan Klinsmann | 1 | 0 | 0 | 0 | 0 | 0 | 1 | 0 |
Defenders
| 2 | DF | (Slovakia) SVK | Peter Pekarík | 23 | 1 | 17 | 0 | 1 | 0 | 5 | 1 |
| 4 | DF | (Netherlands) NED | Karim Rekik | 31 | 2 | 26 | 2 | 2 | 0 | 3 | 0 |
| 5 | DF | (Germany) GER | Niklas Stark | 31 | 2 | 25+1 | 1 | 1 | 1 | 4 | 0 |
| 17 | DF | (Germany) GER | Maximilian Mittelstädt | 14 | 0 | 5+6 | 0 | 0 | 0 | 3 | 0 |
| 21 | DF | (Germany) GER | Marvin Plattenhardt | 38 | 0 | 33 | 0 | 2 | 0 | 3 | 0 |
| 23 | DF | (Germany) GER | Mitchell Weiser | 31 | 2 | 23+1 | 1 | 2 | 1 | 4+1 | 0 |
| 25 | DF | (Germany) GER | Jordan Torunarigha | 15 | 1 | 7+5 | 1 | 0 | 0 | 3 | 0 |
| 28 | DF | (Switzerland) SUI | Fabian Lustenberger | 29 | 0 | 18+5 | 0 | 1 | 0 | 5 | 0 |
| 29 | DF | (Germany) GER | Florian Baak | 0 | 0 | 0 | 0 | 0 | 0 | 0 | 0 |
Midfielders
| 3 | MF | (Norway) NOR | Per Ciljan Skjelbred | 33 | 0 | 24+4 | 0 | 2 | 0 | 1+2 | 0 |
| 6 | MF | (Czech Republic) CZE | Vladimír Darida | 24 | 0 | 18+3 | 0 | 1 | 0 | 1+1 | 0 |
| 7 | MF | (Germany) GER | Alexander Esswein | 22 | 2 | 6+10 | 2 | 1 | 0 | 4+1 | 0 |
| 10 | MF | (Slovakia) SVK | Ondrej Duda | 23 | 1 | 9+8 | 1 | 0+2 | 0 | 3+1 | 0 |
| 18 | MF | (Germany) GER | Sinan Kurt | 0 | 0 | 0 | 0 | 0 | 0 | 0 | 0 |
| 20 | MF | (Austria) AUT | Valentino Lazaro | 31 | 2 | 19+7 | 2 | 1 | 0 | 4 | 0 |
| 26 | MF | (Germany) GER | Arne Maier | 21 | 0 | 14+3 | 0 | 0+1 | 0 | 3 | 0 |
| 30 | MF | (Switzerland) SUI | Julius Kade | 1 | 0 | 0 | 0 | 0 | 0 | 0+1 | 0 |
| 32 | MF | (Germany) GER | Palkó Dárdai | 4 | 0 | 0+2 | 0 | 0 | 0 | 1+1 | 0 |
Forwards
| 8 | FW | (Ivory Coast) CIV | Salomon Kalou | 36 | 12 | 27+4 | 12 | 2 | 0 | 2+1 | 0 |
| 11 | FW | (Australia) AUS | Mathew Leckie | 29 | 6 | 19+7 | 5 | 1 | 0 | 1+1 | 1 |
| 16 | FW | (Germany) GER | Julian Schieber | 3 | 0 | 0+3 | 0 | 0 | 0 | 0 | 0 |
| 19 | FW | (Bosnia and Herzegovina) BIH | Vedad Ibišević | 33 | 7 | 18+9 | 6 | 1+1 | 1 | 2+2 | 0 |
| 27 | FW | (Germany) GER | Davie Selke | 31 | 14 | 19+8 | 10 | 1 | 0 | 3 | 4 |
Players transferred out during the season
| 15 | DF | (Germany) GER | Sebastian Langkamp | 16 | 0 | 11+1 | 0 | 1 | 0 | 3 | 0 |
| 27 | MF | (Switzerland) SUI | Valentin Stocker | 5 | 0 | 0+3 | 0 | 0 | 0 | 1+1 | 0 |
| 24 | FW | (Japan) JPN | Genki Haraguchi | 11 | 0 | 2+5 | 0 | 0+1 | 0 | 1+2 | 0 |

Last updated: 12 May 2018
Source: Competitions
