= 2018–19 Hertha BSC season =

Hertha BSC
2018–19 season
- President: Werner Gegenbauer
- Sporting director: Michael Preetz
- Manager: Pál Dárdai
- Stadium: Olympiastadion Berlin
- Bundesliga: 11th
- DFB-Pokal: Round of 16
- Top goalscorer: League: Ondrej Duda (11 goals); All: Vedad Ibišević (12 goals)
- Biggest win: Gladbach 0–3 Hertha
- Biggest defeat: Leipzig 5–0 Hertha
Home colours	Away colours	Third colours

The 2018–19 Hertha BSC season was the 127th season in the football club's history and 6th consecutive and 36th overall season in the top flight of German football, the Bundesliga, having been promoted from the 2. Bundesliga in 2013. In addition to the domestic league, Hertha BSC also participated in this season's editions of the domestic cup, the DFB-Pokal. This was the 51st season for Hertha in the Olympiastadion Berlin, located in Berlin, Germany. Hertha BSC drew an average of 49,320 spectators per home game at the Olympiastadion during the 2018–19 Bundesliga season, filling approximately 66.1% of the stadium's 74,669 capacity. The season covered a period from 1 July 2018 to 30 June 2019.

== Friendly matches ==
Win Draw Loss

24 May 2019 Friendly	Forward Madison FC	0–4	Hertha BSC	Madison, Wisconsin, United States
19:00 CDT (UTC−5)			25', 45', 57', 80'	Stadium: Breese Stevens Field

== Competitions ==
Win Draw Loss

=== Overview ===
Competition	First match	Last match	Starting round	Final position	Record							
Competition	First match	Last match	Starting round	Final position	Pld	W	D	L	GF	GA	GD	Win %
Bundesliga	25 August 2018	18 May 2019	Matchday 1	11th	34	11	10	13	49	57	−8	32.35
DFB-Pokal	20 August 2018	6 February 2019	First round	Round of 16	3	2	0	1	6	4	+2	66.67
Total					37	13	10	14	55	61	−6	35.14

Last updated: 25 May 2019
Source: Competitions

=== Bundesliga ===
==== League table ====
Pos	Team	Pld	W	D	L	GF	GA	GD	Pts
9	1899 Hoffenheim	34	13	12	9	70	52	+18	51
10	Fortuna Düsseldorf	34	13	5	16	49	65	−16	44
11	Hertha BSC	34	11	10	13	49	57	−8	43
12	Mainz 05	34	12	7	15	46	57	−11	43
13	SC Freiburg	34	8	12	14	46	61	−15	36

Source: DFB
Rules for classification: 1) Points; 2) Goal difference; 3) Goals scored; 4) Head-to-head results; 5) Head-to-head away goals scored; 6) Away goals scored; 7) Play-off

==== Results summary ====
Overall								Home						Away					
Pld	W	D	L	GF	GA	GD	Pts	W	D	L	GF	GA	GD	W	D	L	GF	GA	GD
34	11	10	13	49	57	−8	43	6	6	5	26	27	−1	5	4	8	23	30	−7

Last updated: 25 May 2019.
Source: Bundesliga

==== Results by round ====
Round	1	2	3	4	5	6	7	8	9	10	11	12	13	14	15	16	17	18	19	20	21	22	23	24	25	26	27	28	29	30	31	32	33	34
Ground	H	A	A	H	A	H	A	H	A	H	A	H	A	H	A	H	A	A	H	H	A	H	A	H	A	H	A	H	A	H	A	H	A	H
Result	W	W	D	W	L	W	D	D	D	L	L	D	W	W	L	D	L	W	D	L	W	D	L	W	L	L	L	L	L	D	D	W	W	L
Position	7	3	4	2	4	3	5	6	9	8	8	8	7	6	7	8	8	7	7	9	8	9	10	8	10	10	10	11	11	11	11	11	10	11

Updated to match(es) played on 25 May 2019. Source: DFB
A = Away; H = Home; W = Win; D = Draw; L = Loss

==== Matches ====
25 August 2018 1	Hertha BSC	1–0	1. FC Nürnberg	Berlin
15:30 CEST (UTC+2)	Ibišević 27'	Report		Stadium: Olympiastadion Berlin; Attendance: 52,729; Referee: Tobias Welz

2 September 2018 2	Schalke 04	0–2	Hertha BSC	Gelsenkirchen
18:00 CEST (UTC+2)		Report	Duda 15', 90+6'	Stadium: Veltins-Arena; Attendance: 60,181; Referee: Sascha Stegemann

15 September 2018 3	VfL Wolfsburg	2–2	Hertha BSC	Wolfsburg
15:30 CEST (UTC+2)	Mallı 87' (pen.); Mehmedi 90+3'	Report	Dilrosun 61'; Duda 90+1'	Stadium: Volkswagen Arena; Attendance: 25,090; Referee: Christian Dingert

22 September 2018 4	Hertha BSC	4–2	Borussia Mönchengladbach	Berlin
15:30 CEST (UTC+2)	Ibišević 31', 63'; Lazaro 34'; Duda 73'	Report	Hazard 29' (pen.); Pléa 67'	Stadium: Olympiastadion Berlin; Attendance: 51,852; Referee: Markus Schmidt

25 September 2018 5	Werder Bremen	3–1	Hertha BSC	Bremen
18:30 CEST (UTC+2)	Harnik 11'; Veljković 45'; Kruse 66' (pen.)	Report	Dilrosun 53'	Stadium: Weser-Stadion; Attendance: 39,100; Referee: Guido Winkmann

28 September 2018 6	Hertha BSC	2–0	Bayern Munich	Berlin
20:30 CEST (UTC+2)	Ibišević 23' (pen.); Duda 44'	Report		Stadium: Olympiastadion Berlin; Attendance: 74,669; Referee: Marco Fritz

6 October 2018 7	Mainz 05	0–0	Hertha BSC	Mainz
15:30 CEST (UTC+2)		Report		Stadium: Opel Arena; Attendance: 22,405; Referee: Daniel Schlager

21 October 2018 8	Hertha BSC	1–1	SC Freiburg	Berlin
15:30 CEST (UTC+2)	Duda 7'	Report	Koch 36'	Stadium: Olympiastadion Berlin; Attendance: 53,716; Referee: Benjamin Cortus

27 October 2018 9	Borussia Dortmund	2–2	Hertha BSC	Dortmund
15:30 CEST (UTC+2)	Sancho 27', 61'	Report	Kalou 41', 90+1' (pen.)	Stadium: Signal Iduna Park; Attendance: 81,000; Referee: Sascha Stegemann

3 November 2018 10	Hertha BSC	0–3	RB Leipzig	Berlin
18:30 CET (UTC+1)		Report	Werner 7', 53'; Cunha 75'	Stadium: Olympiastadion Berlin; Attendance: 50,382; Referee: Deniz Aytekin

10 November 2018 11	Fortuna Düsseldorf	4–1	Hertha BSC	Düsseldorf
15:30 CET (UTC+1)	Usami 50'; Hennings 63'; Raman 84', 90+2'	Report	Selke 88'	Stadium: Merkur Spiel-Arena; Attendance: 38,743; Referee: Robert Hartmann

24 November 2018 12	Hertha BSC	3–3	1899 Hoffenheim	Berlin
15:30 CET (UTC+1)	Ibišević 13'; Leckie 71'; Lazaro 87'	Report	Demirbay 1'; Kramarić 10'; Bičakčić 55'	Stadium: Olympiastadion Berlin; Attendance: 44,508; Referee: Tobias Welz

1 December 2018 13	Hannover 96	0–2	Hertha BSC	Hanover
15:30 CET (UTC+1)		Report	Torunarigha 44'; Ibišević 73'	Stadium: HDI-Arena; Attendance: 35,800; Referee: Felix Brych

8 December 2018 14	Hertha BSC	1–0	Eintracht Frankfurt	Berlin
18:30 CET (UTC+1)	Grujić 40'	Report		Stadium: Olympiastadion Berlin; Attendance: 42,578; Referee: Daniel Schlager

15 December 2018 15	VfB Stuttgart	2–1	Hertha BSC	Stuttgart
15:30 CET (UTC+1)	Gómez 64', 76'	Report	Mittelstädt 38'	Stadium: Mercedes-Benz Arena; Attendance: 47,680; Referee: Sascha Stegemann

18 December 2018 16	Hertha BSC	2–2	FC Augsburg	Berlin
20:30 CET (UTC+1)	Leckie 28'; Duda 31'	Report	Hinteregger 8'; Koo 39'	Stadium: Olympiastadion Berlin; Attendance: 27,939; Referee: Frank Willenborg

22 December 2018 17	Bayer Leverkusen	3–1	Hertha BSC	Leverkusen
15:30 CET (UTC+1)	Volland 5'; Havertz 23', 49'	Report	Torunarigha 26'	Stadium: BayArena; Attendance: 27,647; Referee: Tobias Stieler

20 January 2019 18	1. FC Nürnberg	1–3	Hertha BSC	Nuremberg
15:30 CET (UTC+1)	Behrens 42'	Report	Ibišević 15'; Duda 50', 70'	Stadium: Max-Morlock-Stadion; Attendance: 36,112; Referee: Guido Winkmann

25 January 2019 19	Hertha BSC	2–2	Schalke 04	Berlin
20:30 CET (UTC+1)	Grujić 39'; Ibišević 45+4'	Report	Konoplyanka 17'; Uth 44'	Stadium: Olympiastadion Berlin; Attendance: 43,027; Referee: Felix Brych

2 February 2019 20	Hertha BSC	0–1	VfL Wolfsburg	Berlin
15:30 CET (UTC+1)		Report	Weghorst 65'	Stadium: Olympiastadion Berlin; Attendance: 39,259; Referee: Bastian Dankert

9 February 2019 21	Borussia Mönchengladbach	0–3	Hertha BSC	Mönchengladbach
15:30 CET (UTC+1)		Report	Kalou 30'; Duda 56', 76'	Stadium: Borussia-Park; Attendance: 48,232; Referee: Martin Petersen

16 February 2019 22	Hertha BSC	1–1	Werder Bremen	Berlin
18:30 CET (UTC+1)	Selke 25'	Report	Pizarro 90+6'	Stadium: Olympiastadion Berlin; Attendance: 49,627; Referee: Sören Storks

23 February 2019 23	Bayern Munich	1–0	Hertha BSC	Munich
15:30 CET (UTC+1)	Martínez 62'	Report		Stadium: Allianz Arena; Attendance: 75,000; Referee: Harm Osmers

2 March 2019 24	Hertha BSC	2–1	Mainz 05	Berlin
15:30 CET (UTC+1)	Grujić 50'; Stark 60'	Report	Stark 46' (o.g.)	Stadium: Olympiastadion Berlin; Attendance: 33,981; Referee: Deniz Aytekin

9 March 2019 25	SC Freiburg	2–1	Hertha BSC	Freiburg
15:30 CET (UTC+1)	Petersen 27'; Ibišević 80' (o.g.)	Report	Ibišević 76'	Stadium: Schwarzwald-Stadion; Attendance: 24,000; Referee: Robert Schröder

16 March 2019 26	Hertha BSC	2–3	Borussia Dortmund	Berlin
18:30 CET (UTC+1)	Kalou 4', 35' (pen.)	Report	Delaney 14'; Zagadou 47'; Reus 90+2'	Stadium: Olympiastadion Berlin; Attendance: 74,667; Referee: Tobias Welz

30 March 2019 27	RB Leipzig	5–0	Hertha BSC	Leipzig
18:30 CET (UTC+1)	Forsberg 17'; Poulsen 27', 56', 62'; Haidara 64'	Report		Stadium: Red Bull Arena; Attendance: 41,939; Referee: Sören Storks

6 April 2019 28	Hertha BSC	1–2	Fortuna Düsseldorf	Berlin
15:30 CEST (UTC+2)	Grujić 41'	Report	Raman 35', 61'	Stadium: Olympiastadion Berlin; Attendance: 51,604; Referee: Christian Dingert

14 April 2019 29	1899 Hoffenheim	2–0	Hertha BSC	Sinsheim
13:30 CEST (UTC+2)	Amiri 29'; Nelson 76'	Report		Stadium: PreZero Arena; Attendance: 28,010; Referee: Martin Petersen

21 April 2019 30	Hertha BSC	0–0	Hannover 96	Berlin
18:00 CEST (UTC+2)		Report		Stadium: Olympiastadion Berlin; Attendance: 38,916; Referee: Sascha Stegemann

27 April 2019 31	Eintracht Frankfurt	0–0	Hertha BSC	Frankfurt
15:30 CEST (UTC+2)		Report		Stadium: Commerzbank-Arena; Attendance: 51,500; Referee: Sven Jablonski

4 May 2019 32	Hertha BSC	3–1	VfB Stuttgart	Berlin
15:30 CEST (UTC+2)	Ibišević 40'; Duda 45+1'; Kalou 67'	Report	Gómez 70'	Stadium: Olympiastadion Berlin; Attendance: 48,668; Referee: Daniel Schlager

11 May 2019 33	FC Augsburg	3–4	Hertha BSC	Augsburg
15:30 CEST (UTC+2)	Hahn 10'; Gregoritsch 50' (pen.), 70'	Report	Plattenhardt 47'; Grujić 66'; Kalou 75', 90+3' (pen.)	Stadium: WWK Arena; Attendance: 29,307; Referee: Guido Winkmann

18 May 2019 34	Hertha BSC	1–5	Bayer Leverkusen	Berlin
15:30 CEST (UTC+2)	Lazaro 34'	Report	Havertz 28'; Alario 38', 72', 88'; Brandt 54'	Stadium: Olympiastadion Berlin; Attendance: 59,287; Referee: Marco Fritz

=== DFB-Pokal ===
20 August 2018 First round	Eintracht Braunschweig	1–2	Hertha BSC	Braunschweig
18:30 CEST (UTC+2)	Fejzullahu 81'	Report	Plattenhardt 38'; Ibišević 83'	Stadium: Eintracht-Stadion; Attendance: 16,710; Referee: Guido Winkmann

30 October 2018 Second round	Darmstadt 98	0–2	Hertha BSC	Darmstadt
18:45 CET (UTC+1)		Report	Ibišević 64'; Mittelstädt 88'	Stadium: Merck-Stadion am Böllenfalltor; Attendance: 15,000; Referee: Robert Kampka
Note: The Darmstadt 98 v Hertha BSC match, originally scheduled for 18:30 CET, was delayed to 18:45 CET due to a traffic jam around the stadium.

6 February 2019 Round of 16	Hertha BSC	2–3 (a.e.t.)	Bayern Munich	Berlin
20:45 CET (UTC+1)	Mittelstädt 3'; Selke 67'	Report	Gnabry 7', 49'; Coman 98'	Stadium: Olympiastadion Berlin; Attendance: 74,667; Referee: Markus Schmidt

== Statistics ==
=== Appearances and goals ===
No.	Pos	Nat	Player	Total		Bundesliga		DFB-Pokal	
No.	Pos	Nat	Player	Apps	Goals	Apps	Goals	Apps	Goals
Goalkeepers
1	GK	(Germany) GER	Thomas Kraft	5	0	3+1	0	1	0
12	GK	(Germany) GER	Dennis Smarsch	0	0	0	0	0	0
22	GK	(Norway) NOR	Rune Jarstein	33	0	31	0	2	0
33	GK	(United States) USA	Jonathan Klinsmann	0	0	0	0	0	0
35	GK	(Germany) GER	Marius Gersbeck	0	0	0	0	0	0
Defenders
2	DF	(Slovakia) SVK	Peter Pekarík	3	0	2+1	0	0	0
4	DF	(Netherlands) NED	Karim Rekik	27	0	24	0	3	0
5	DF	(Germany) GER	Niklas Stark	25	1	22	1	3	0
13	DF	(Germany) GER	Lukas Klünter	11	0	7+3	0	0+1	0
17	DF	(Germany) GER	Maximilian Mittelstädt	28	3	20+5	1	2+1	2
21	DF	(Germany) GER	Marvin Plattenhardt	25	2	22	1	3	1
25	DF	(Germany) GER	Jordan Torunarigha	16	2	13+1	2	1+1	0
29	DF	(Germany) GER	Florian Baak	1	0	0+1	0	0	0
31	DF	(Netherlands) NED	Derrick Luckassen	4	0	2+2	0	0	0
Midfielders
3	MF	(Norway) NOR	Per Ciljan Skjelbred	17	0	12+4	0	1	0
6	MF	(Czech Republic) CZE	Vladimír Darida	11	0	3+7	0	1	0
10	MF	(Slovakia) SVK	Ondrej Duda	35	11	30+2	11	3	0
11	MF	(Australia) AUS	Mathew Leckie	19	2	10+8	2	0+1	0
15	MF	(Serbia) SRB	Marko Grujić	23	5	20+2	5	1	0
16	MF	(Netherlands) NED	Javairô Dilrosun	18	2	7+10	2	1	0
20	MF	(Austria) AUT	Valentino Lazaro	34	3	31	3	3	0
23	MF	(Germany) GER	Arne Maier	26	0	23+1	0	2	0
28	MF	(Switzerland) SUI	Fabian Lustenberger	30	0	24+5	0	0+1	0
30	MF	(Germany) GER	Julius Kade	0	0	0	0	0	0
34	MF	(Germany) GER	Maurice Covic	0	0	0	0	0	0
Forwards
8	FW	(Ivory Coast) CIV	Salomon Kalou	33	8	27+3	8	3	0
14	FW	(Germany) GER	Pascal Köpke	8	0	0+7	0	0+1	0
19	FW	(Bosnia and Herzegovina) BIH	Vedad Ibišević	31	12	24+4	10	2+1	2
24	FW	(Germany) GER	Palkó Dárdai	8	0	1+6	0	0+1	0
27	FW	(Germany) GER	Davie Selke	32	4	16+14	3	1+1	1
32	FW	(Germany) GER	Dennis Jastrzembski	6	0	0+5	0	0+1	0
36	FW	(Germany) GER	Muhammed Kiprit	0	0	0	0	0	0
Players transferred out during the season
7	MF	(Germany) GER	Alexander Esswein	0	0	0	0	0	0
18	MF	(Germany) GER	Sinan Kurt	0	0	0	0	0	0
26	MF	(Germany) GER	Sidney Friede	0	0	0	0	0	0

Last updated: 18 May 2019
Source: Competitions
