= 2016–17 Hertha BSC season =

Hertha BSC
2016–17 season
- General manager: Michael Preetz
- President: Werner Gegenbauer
- Manager: Pál Dárdai
- Stadium: Olympiastadion Berlin
- Bundesliga: 6th
- DFB-Pokal: Round of 16
- Europa League: Third qualifying round
- Top goalscorer: League: Vedad Ibišević (12 goals); All: Vedad Ibišević (14 goals)
- Biggest win: Hertha 3–0 Gladbach
- Biggest defeat: Hertha 2–6 Leverkusen
Home colours	Away colours	Third colours

The 2016–17 Hertha BSC season was the 125th season in the football club's history and fourth consecutive and 34th overall season in the top flight of German football, the Bundesliga, having been promoted from the 2. Bundesliga in 2013. Hertha BSC also participated in this season's edition of the domestic cup, the DFB-Pokal. It was the 49th overall season for Hertha BSC in the Olympiastadion, located in Berlin, Germany. The season covered a period from 1 July 2016 to 30 June 2017.

== Background ==
Hertha finished seventh in the 2015–16 Bundesliga, earning them qualification to the 2016–17 Europa League third qualifying round.

== Players ==
=== Squad ===
Note: Flags indicate national team as defined under FIFA eligibility rules; some limited exceptions apply. Players may hold more than one non-FIFA nationality.

No.	Pos.	Nation	Player
1	GK	GER	Thomas Kraft
2	DF	SVK	Peter Pekarík (Vice-captain)
3	MF	NOR	Per Ciljan Skjelbred
5	DF	GER	Niklas Stark
6	MF	CZE	Vladimír Darida
7	MF	GER	Alexander Esswein
8	FW	CIV	Salomon Kalou
9	MF	GER	Alexander Baumjohann
10	MF	SVK	Ondrej Duda
11	FW	TUN	Sami Allagui
13	DF	GER	Jens Hegeler
14	MF	SUI	Valentin Stocker
15	DF	GER	Sebastian Langkamp
16	FW	GER	Julian Schieber
18	MF	GER	Sinan Kurt

No.	Pos.	Nation	Player
19	FW	BIH	Vedad Ibišević (Captain)
20	MF	BRA	Allan (on loan from Liverpool)
21	DF	GER	Marvin Plattenhardt
22	GK	NOR	Rune Jarstein
23	DF	GER	Mitchell Weiser
24	MF	JPN	Genki Haraguchi
25	DF	USA	John Brooks
28	DF	SUI	Fabian Lustenberger
29	GK	GER	Nils Körber
31	MF	GER	Florian Kohls
34	DF	GER	Maximilian Mittelstädt
36	MF	GER	Julius Kade
39	DF	GER	Florian Baak
40	DF	GER	Jordan Torunarigha

=== Transfers ===
==== In ====
No.	Pos.	Nat.	Name	Age	EU	Moving from	Type	Transfer window	Ends	Transfer fee	Source
19	MF	(Bosnia and Herzegovina)	Vedad Ibišević	31	Non-EU	VfB Stuttgart	Transfer	Summer	2017	Free	
35	GK	(Germany)	Marius Gersbeck	21	EU	Chemnitzer FC	End of loan	Summer	2017	Free	
7	FW	(Japan)	Hajime Hosogai	30	Non-EU	Bursaspor (Turkey)	End of loan	Summer	2017	Free	
10	MF	(Slovakia)	Ondrej Duda	21	EU	Legia Warsaw (Poland)	Transfer	Summer	2020	Undisclosed	

==== Out ====
No.	Pos.	Nat.	Name	Age	EU	Moving to	Type	Transfer window	Transfer fee	Source
23	DF	(Germany)	Johannes van den Bergh	29	EU	Getafe (Spain)	Transfer	Summer	Free	
30	GK	(Germany)	Sascha Burchert	26	EU	SpVgg Greuther Fürth	Transfer	Summer	Free	
35	GK	(Germany)	Marius Gersbeck	21	EU	Chemnitzer FC	Loan	Summer	Free	
27	MF	(Netherlands)	Roy Beerens	28	EU	Reading (England)	Transfer	Summer	Undisclosed	
19	MF	(Bosnia and Herzegovina)	Vedad Ibišević	31	Non-EU	VfB Stuttgart	End of loan	Summer	Free	

== Friendly matches ==
Win Draw Loss

3 July 2016 Friendly	FC Schwedt 02 (Germany)	0–10	(Germany) Hertha BSC	Schwedt/Oder, Germany
15:00 CEST (UTC+2)		Report	Maier 14'; Covic 16'; Schieber 23'; Allagui 44'; Ibišević 63', 69', 72', 75', 87'; Baumjohann 79'	Stadium: Stadion Heinrichslust

8 July 2016 Friendly	FSV Luckenwalde (Germany)	0–5; Abandoned	(Germany) Hertha BSC	Luckenwalde, Germany
18:00 CEST (UTC+2)		Report	Langkamp 7'; Lustenberger 12'; Kalou 33'; Ibišević 65', 70'	Stadium: Werner-Seelenbinder-Stadion; Attendance: 2,804
Note: The match ended in the 81st minute due to a thunderstorm.

23 July 2016 Friendly	AZ (Netherlands)	3–0	(Germany) Hertha BSC	Alkmaar, Netherlands
16:00 CEST (UTC+2)	Weghorst 35', 54' (pen.); Henriksen 38'	Report		Stadium: AFAS Stadion; Attendance: 7,000; Referee: Danny Makkelie (Netherlands)

30 July 2016 Friendly	Eintracht Braunschweig (Germany)	1–2	(Germany) Hertha BSC	Salzgitter, Germany
14:30 CEST (UTC+2)	Ademi 17'	Report	Haraguchi 10'; Allagui 81' (pen.)	Stadium: Stadion am Salzgittersee; Attendance: 1,892

6 August 2016 Friendly	Hertha BSC (Germany)	3–2	(United Arab Emirates) Al-Jazira	Berlin, Germany
15:30 CEST (UTC+2)	Schieber 17'; Haraguchi 80', 81'	Report	Boussoufa 33'; Boussoufa 37' (pen.)	Stadium: Stadion auf dem Wurfplatz; Attendance: 566

13 August 2016 Friendly	Hertha BSC (Germany)	1–4	(Italy) Napoli	Berlin, Germany
18:00 CEST (UTC+2)	Ibišević 24'	Report	Hamšík 36'; Callejón 54'; Milik 71'; Mertens 83'	Stadium: Friedrich-Ludwig-Jahn-Sportpark; Attendance: 5,829

=== Schauinsland-Reisen-Cup ===
17 July 2016 Semi-finals	Nantes (France)	1–1 (5–6 p)	(Germany) Hertha BSC	Duisburg, Germany
14:00 CEST (UTC+2)	Sala 8'	Report	Langkamp 19'	Stadium: Schauinsland-Reisen-Arena; Attendance: 5,026
	Penalties
	Lucas Lima (penalty scored); Rongier (penalty scored); Thomasson (penalty scored); Sala (penalty scored); Gillet (penalty scored); Thomsen (penalty missed); Diego Carlos (penalty missed)		(penalty scored) Lustenberger; (penalty scored) Ibišević; (penalty scored) Ciğerci; (penalty missed) Weiser; (penalty scored) Kalou; (penalty scored) Baumjohann; (penalty scored) Skjelbred
Note: The match was only 45 minutes.

17 July 2016 Final	MSV Duisburg (Germany)	2–2 (2–3 p)	(Germany) Hertha BSC	Duisburg, Germany
17:10 CEST (UTC+2)	Janjić 17', 32'	Report	Schieber 38', 44'	Stadium: Schauinsland-Reisen-Arena; Attendance: 5,026
	Penalties
	Janjić (penalty scored); Dausch (penalty missed); Wolze (penalty scored); Wiegel (penalty missed); Özbek (penalty missed)		(penalty scored) Darida; (penalty scored) Hegeler; (penalty scored) Kohls; (penalty missed) Stark
Note: The match was only 45 minutes.

== Competitions ==
Win Draw Loss

=== Overview ===
Competition	First match	Last match	Starting round	Final position	Record							
Competition	First match	Last match	Starting round	Final position	Pld	W	D	L	GF	GA	GD	Win %
Bundesliga	28 August 2016	20 May 2017	Matchday 1	6th	34	15	4	15	43	47	−4	44.12
DFB-Pokal	21 August 2016	8 February 2017	First round	Round of 16	3	1	2	0	4	2	+2	33.33
Europa League	28 July 2016	4 August 2016	Third qualifying round	Third qualifying round	2	1	0	1	2	3	−1	50.00
Total					39	17	6	16	49	52	−3	43.59

Last updated: 27 May 2017
Source: Competitions

=== Bundesliga ===
==== League table ====
Pos	Team	Pld	W	D	L	GF	GA	GD	Pts	Qualification or relegation
4	1899 Hoffenheim	34	16	14	4	64	37	+27	62	Qualification for the Champions League play-off round
5	1. FC Köln	34	12	13	9	51	42	+9	49	Qualification for the Europa League group stage (Note: Since the winners of the 2016–17 DFB-Pokal, Borussia Dortmund, qualified for the Champions League based on league position, the Europa League group stage spot was passed to the sixth-placed team, Hertha BSC; and the Europa League third qualifying round spot was passed to the seventh-placed team, SC Freiburg.)
6	Hertha BSC	34	15	4	15	43	47	−4	49	Qualification for the Europa League group stage
7	SC Freiburg	34	14	6	14	42	60	−18	48	Qualification for the Europa League third qualifying round
8	Werder Bremen	34	13	6	15	61	64	−3	45	

Source: DFB
Rules for classification: 1) Points; 2) Goal difference; 3) Goals scored; 4) Head-to-head points; 5) Head-to-head goal difference; 6) Head-to-head away goals scored; 7) Away goals scored; 8) Play-off.

==== Results summary ====
Overall								Home						Away					
Pld	W	D	L	GF	GA	GD	Pts	W	D	L	GF	GA	GD	W	D	L	GF	GA	GD
34	15	4	15	43	47	−4	49	12	1	4	28	19	+9	3	3	11	15	28	−13

Last updated: 27 May 2017.
Source: Bundesliga

==== Results by round ====
Round	1	2	3	4	5	6	7	8	9	10	11	12	13	14	15	16	17	18	19	20	21	22	23	24	25	26	27	28	29	30	31	32	33	34
Ground	H	A	H	A	A	H	A	H	A	H	A	H	A	H	A	H	A	A	H	A	H	H	A	H	A	H	A	H	A	H	A	H	A	H
Result	W	W	W	L	D	W	D	W	L	W	D	W	W	L	L	W	L	L	W	L	D	W	L	W	L	L	L	W	L	W	L	L	W	L
Position	4	2	2	5	6	2	4	3	5	4	6	3	3	3	4	3	5	6	6	6	6	5	5	5	5	5	6	5	5	5	5	6	5	6

Updated to match(es) played on 27 May 2017. Source: Bundesliga
A = Away; H = Home; W = Win; D = Draw; L = Loss

==== Matches ====
28 August 2016 1	Hertha BSC	2–1	SC Freiburg	Berlin
15:30 CEST (UTC+2)	Darida 62'; Schieber 90+5'	Report	Gulde (yellow card) 34'; Niederlechner (yellow card) 83'; Höfler 90+3', (yellow card) 90+7'	Stadium: Olympiastadion Berlin; Attendance: 41,648; Referee: Benjamin Brand

10 September 2016 2	FC Ingolstadt	0–2	Hertha BSC	Ingolstadt
15:30 CEST (UTC+2)	Morales (yellow card) 6'; Levels (yellow card) 63'; Suttner (yellow card) 88'	Report	Ibišević 8'; Esswein (yellow card) 74'; Schieber 86'	Stadium: Audi Sportpark; Attendance: 14,100; Referee: Jochen Drees

18 September 2016 3	Hertha BSC	2–0	Schalke 04	Berlin
17:30 CEST (UTC+2)	Pekarík (yellow card) 63'; Weiser 64'; Stocker 74'	Report	Fährmann (yellow card) 63'	Stadium: Olympiastadion Berlin; Attendance: 49,251; Referee: Deniz Aytekin

21 September 2016 4	Bayern Munich	3–0	Hertha BSC	Munich
20:00 CEST (UTC+2)	Ribéry 16'; Thiago 68'; Robben 72'; Vidal (yellow card) 80'	Report		Stadium: Allianz Arena; Attendance: 75,000; Referee: Marco Fritz

24 September 2016 5	Eintracht Frankfurt	3–3	Hertha BSC	Frankfurt
15:30 CEST (UTC+2)	Huszti (yellow card) 17'; Fabián 39'; Meier 45'; Oczipka (yellow card) 71'; Mascarell (yellow card) 76'; Rebić (yellow card) 85'; Hector 90+2'	Report	Ibišević 19' (pen.), 58'; Pekarík (yellow card) 42'; Esswein 65'; Schieber (yellow card) 85'	Stadium: Commerzbank-Arena; Attendance: 45,000; Referee: Felix Brych

1 October 2016 6	Hertha BSC	2–0	Hamburger SV	Berlin
15:30 CEST (UTC+2)	Plattenhardt (yellow card) 16'; Ibišević 29', 70' (pen.); Haraguchi (yellow card) 31'	Report	Douglas Santos (yellow card) 3'; Holtby (yellow card) 27'; Ekdal (yellow card) 32'; Müller (yellow card) 48'; Cléber (yellow card) 78'; Lasogga (yellow card) 90+2'	Stadium: Olympiastadion Berlin; Attendance: 57,656; Referee: Guido Winkmann

14 October 2016 7	Borussia Dortmund	1–1	Hertha BSC	Dortmund
20:30 CEST (UTC+2)	Dembélé (yellow card) 64'; Aubameyang 80'; Mor (red card) 84'	Report	Stark (yellow card) 19'; Stocker 51', (red card) 90'; Brooks (yellow card) 53'; Esswein (yellow card) 64'; Langkamp (yellow card) 84'; Allagui (yellow card) 88'	Stadium: SIGNAL IDUNA PARK; Attendance: 80,800; Referee: Patrick Ittrich

22 October 2016 8	Hertha BSC	2–1	1. FC Köln	Berlin
15:30 CEST (UTC+2)	Ibišević 13'; Langkamp (yellow card) 44'; Stark 74'; Brooks (yellow card) 90+3'	Report	Modeste 65'; Heintz (yellow card) 73'	Stadium: Olympiastadion Berlin; Attendance: 60,576; Referee: Frank Willenborg

30 October 2016 9	1899 Hoffenheim	1–0	Hertha BSC	Sinsheim
15:30 CET (UTC+1)	Süle 31'	Report	Weiser (yellow card) 62'; Stark (yellow card) 69'; Allan (yellow card) 75'; Schieber (yellow card) 84'	Stadium: WIRSOL Rhein-Neckar-Arena; Attendance: 28,015; Referee: Benjamin Cortus

4 November 2016 10	Hertha BSC	3–0	Borussia Mönchengladbach	Berlin
20:30 CET (UTC+1)	Kalou 18', 33', 84'; Stark (yellow card) 45+1'; Mittelstädt (yellow card) 64'	Report	Kramer (yellow card) 8' (yellow-red card) 39'; Wendt (yellow card) 29'; Strobl (yellow card) 43'	Stadium: Olympiastadion Berlin; Attendance: 51,934; Referee: Tobias Stieler

19 November 2016 11	FC Augsburg	0–0	Hertha BSC	Augsburg
15:30 CET (UTC+1)	Kohr (yellow card) 28'; Baier (yellow card) 71'; Ji (yellow card) 85'	Report	Ibišević (yellow card) 84'	Stadium: WWK ARENA; Attendance: 27,007; Referee: Bastian Dankert

27 November 2016 12	Hertha BSC	2–1	Mainz 05	Berlin
17:30 CET (UTC+1)	Ibišević 36', 67', (yellow card) 58' (yellow-red card) 74'; Darida (yellow card) 88'	Report	Seydel 25'; Gbamin (yellow card) 30' (yellow-red card) 62'	Stadium: Olympiastadion Berlin; Attendance: 37,852; Referee: Guido Winkmann

3 December 2016 13	VfL Wolfsburg	2–3	Hertha BSC	Wolfsburg
15:30 CET (UTC+1)	Mayoral 12'; Seguin 18', (yellow card) 76' (yellow-red card) 87'; Guilavogui (yellow card) 28'; Caligiuri (yellow card) 31'; Arnold (yellow card) 62'	Report	Plattenhardt 16', (yellow card) 59'; Esswein 69'; Kalou 90+1' (pen.); Schieber (yellow card) 90+2'	Stadium: VOLKSWAGEN ARENA; Attendance: 25,317; Referee: Jochen Drees

10 December 2016 14	Hertha BSC	0–1	Werder Bremen	Berlin
18:30 CET (UTC+1)		Report	Kruse 41', (yellow card) 81'; Bargfrede (yellow card) 62'; Fritz (yellow card) 64'	Stadium: Olympiastadion Berlin; Attendance: 51,337; Referee: Harm Osmers

17 December 2016 15	RB Leipzig	2–0	Hertha BSC	Leipzig
15:30 CET (UTC+1)	Werner 40', (yellow card) 59'; Orban 62'	Report	Stark (yellow card) 73'; Lustenberger (yellow card) 78'; Darida (yellow card) 82'	Stadium: Red Bull Arena; Attendance: 42,558; Referee: Marco Fritz

21 December 2016 16	Hertha BSC	2–0	Darmstadt 98	Berlin
20:00 CET (UTC+1)	Plattenhardt (yellow card) 42', (goal) 53'; Kalou 66'	Report	Fedetskyi (yellow card) 65'; Sulu (yellow card) 71'; Niemeyer (yellow card) 90'	Stadium: Olympiastadion Berlin; Attendance: 31,912; Referee: Robert Hartmann

22 January 2017 17	Bayer Leverkusen	3–1	Hertha BSC	Leverkusen
15:30 CET (UTC+1)	Toprak 12'; Çalhanoğlu 36' (pen.), 88'	Report	Stocker 44', (yellow card) 55'; Ibišević (yellow card) 53'	Stadium: BayArena; Attendance: 26,904; Referee: Tobias Stieler

29 January 2017 18	SC Freiburg	2–1	Hertha BSC	Freiburg im Breisgau
15:30 CET (UTC+1)	Haberer 39'; Petersen 87'	Report	Stark (yellow card) 10'; Kalou (yellow card) 34'; Schieber 88'	Stadium: Schwarzwald-Stadion; Attendance: 23,800; Referee: Günter Perl

4 February 2017 19	Hertha BSC	1–0	FC Ingolstadt	Berlin
15:30 CET (UTC+1)	Haraguchi 1'; Ibišević (yellow card) 47'; Darida (yellow card) 89'	Report	Groß (yellow card) 39'; Morales (yellow card) 58'	Stadium: Olympiastadion Berlin; Attendance: 33,425; Referee: Frank Willenborg

11 February 2017 20	Schalke 04	2–0	Hertha BSC	Gelsenkirchen
18:30 CET (UTC+1)	Burgstaller 41'; Goretzka 62'; Bentaleb (yellow card) 85'	Report	Haraguchi (yellow card) 54'; Ibišević (yellow card) 60'	Stadium: VELTINS-Arena; Attendance: 61,981; Referee: Markus Schmidt

18 February 2017 21	Hertha BSC	1–1	Bayern Munich	Berlin
15:30 CET (UTC+1)	Ibišević 21'; Pekarík (yellow card) 90+6'; Jarstein (yellow card) 90+7'	Report	Hummels (yellow card) 64'; Lewandowski (yellow card) 66', (goal) 90+6'; Alonso (yellow card) 68'	Stadium: Olympiastadion Berlin; Attendance: 74,667; Referee: Patrick Ittrich

25 February 2017 22	Hertha BSC	2–0	Eintracht Frankfurt	Berlin
18:30 CET (UTC+1)	Brooks (yellow card) 4'; Haraguchi (yellow card) 40'; Ibišević 52'; Darida 83'	Report	Gaćinović (yellow card) 58'; Hector (yellow card) 75'; Seferovic (red card) 78'	Stadium: Olympiastadion Berlin; Attendance: 43,323; Referee: Sascha Stegemann

5 March 2017 23	Hamburger SV	1–0	Hertha BSC	Hamburg
17:30 CET (UTC+1)	Papadopoulos (yellow card) 55'; Ekdal 77'	Report	Stark (yellow card) 41'; Darida (yellow card) 64'	Stadium: Volksparkstadion; Attendance: 44,445; Referee: Felix Brych

11 March 2017 24	Hertha BSC	2–1	Borussia Dortmund	Berlin
15:30 CET (UTC+1)	Kalou 11'; Langkamp (yellow card) 61'; Plattenhardt 71'; Weiser (yellow card) 90'	Report	Aubameyang 55'; Ginter (yellow card) 70'; Bartra (yellow card) 80'; Dembélé (yellow card) 90'; Pulisic (yellow card) 90+3'	Stadium: Olympiastadion Berlin; Attendance: 74,667; Referee: Robert Hartmann

18 March 2017 25	1. FC Köln	4–2	Hertha BSC	Cologne
15:30 CET (UTC+1)	Osako 6'; Modeste 35', 37', 63'; Maroh (yellow card) 48'; Lehmann (yellow card) 52'	Report	Haraguchi (yellow card) 32'; Langkamp (yellow card) 41'; Ibišević 50' (pen.); Brooks 69'; Allagui (yellow card) 76'	Stadium: RheinEnergieSTADION; Attendance: 49,500; Referee: Marco Fritz

31 March 2017 26	Hertha BSC	1–3	1899 Hoffenheim	Berlin
20:30 CEST (UTC+2)	Pekarík 32'; Mittelstädt (yellow card) 38' (yellow-red card) 58'; Ibišević (yellow card) 42'; Skjelbred (yellow card) 82'	Report	Kramarić 39' (pen.), 86'; Amiri (yellow card) 61'; Süle 76'	Stadium: Olympiastadion Berlin; Attendance: 42,401; Referee: Benjamin Brand

5 April 2017 27	Borussia Mönchengladbach	1–0	Hertha BSC	Mönchengladbach
20:00 CEST (UTC+2)	Bénes 16'; Hazard (yellow card) 89'	Report	Torunarigha (yellow card) 68'	Stadium: BORUSSIA-PARK; Attendance: 44,347; Referee: Günter Perl

9 April 2017 28	Hertha BSC	2–0	FC Augsburg	Berlin
15:30 CEST (UTC+2)	Brooks 12'; Stocker 37'; Darida (yellow card) 79'	Report	Kohr (yellow card) 42'; Janker (yellow card) 82'	Stadium: Olympiastadion Berlin; Attendance: 43,451; Referee: Tobias Stieler

15 April 2017 29	Mainz 05	1–0	Hertha BSC	Mainz
15:30 CEST (UTC+2)	Brooks 45+1' (o.g.); Donati (yellow card) 71'	Report	Mittelstädt (yellow card) 45+2'; Esswein (yellow card) 63'; Brooks (yellow card) 90'	Stadium: OPEL ARENA; Attendance: 30,579; Referee: Deniz Aytekin

22 April 2017 30	Hertha BSC	1–0	VfL Wolfsburg	Berlin
15:30 CEST (UTC+2)	Ibišević 59'; Allan (yellow card) 81'; Darida (yellow card) 90'; Esswein (yellow card) 90+3'	Report	Arnold (yellow card) 39'; Guilavogui (yellow card) 53'; Luiz Gustavo (yellow card) 73'; Mayoral (yellow card) 75'; Gerhardt (yellow card) 90+1'	Stadium: Olympiastadion Berlin; Attendance: 42,521; Referee: Bastian Dankert

29 April 2017 31	Werder Bremen	2–0	Hertha BSC	Bremen
15:30 CEST (UTC+2)	Bartels 9'; Kruse 15'; Moisander (yellow card) 23'	Report	Mittelstädt (yellow card) 28'	Stadium: Weser-Stadion; Attendance: 42,100; Referee: Patrick Ittrich

6 May 2017 32	Hertha BSC	1–4	RB Leipzig	Berlin
18:30 CEST (UTC+2)	Langkamp (yellow card) 52'; Ibišević (yellow card) 74'; Brooks (yellow card) 78'; Khedira 85' (o.g.)	Report	Werner 11', 54'; Compper (yellow card) 34'; Ilsanker (yellow card) 70'; Upamecano (yellow card) 84'; Selke 89', 90+2'	Stadium: Olympiastadion Berlin; Attendance: 62,301; Referee: Robert Hartmann

13 May 2017 33	Darmstadt 98	0–2	Hertha BSC	Darmstadt
15:30 CEST (UTC+2)	Sulu (yellow card) 67'; Rosenthal (yellow card) 84'; Gondorf (yellow card) 86'	Report	Kalou 14'; Torunarigha 28'	Stadium: Jonathan-Heimes-Stadion am Böllenfalltor; Attendance: 17,400; Referee: Benjamin Brand

20 May 2017 34	Hertha BSC	2–6	Bayer Leverkusen	Berlin
15:30 CEST (UTC+2)	Allan (yellow card) 12'; Ibišević (yellow card) 36'; Darida (yellow card) 63'; Weiser 71'; Allagui 86' (pen.)	Report	Hernández 5'; Havertz 31', 45+1'; Wendell (yellow card) 60'; Kießling 64' (pen.); Aránguiz 81' (pen.); Pohjanpalo 90'	Stadium: Olympiastadion Berlin; Attendance: 55,617; Referee: Deniz Aytekin

=== DFB-Pokal ===
21 August 2016 First round	Jahn Regensburg	1–1 (a.e.t.) (3–5 p)	Hertha BSC	Regensburg
18:30 CEST (UTC+2)	Kopp (yellow card) 35'; Pusch 40'; Nandzik 51'; Lais (yellow card) 53'; Geipl (yellow card) 76'	Report	Langkamp (yellow card) 41'; Brooks (yellow card) 41'; Weiser 83', (yellow card) 103'; Darida (yellow card) 90+3'	Stadium: Continental Arena; Attendance: 12,526; Referee: Robert Kampka
	Penalties
	Thommy (penalty scored); Džalto (penalty scored); Hein (penalty scored); Hofrath (penalty missed)		(penalty scored) Ibišević; (penalty scored) Darida; (penalty scored) Weiser; (penalty scored) Plattenhardt; (penalty scored) Kalou

25 October 2016 Second round	FC St. Pauli	0–2	Hertha BSC	Hamburg
20:45 CEST (UTC+2)	Sobota (yellow card) 67'; Nehrig (yellow card) 80'	Report	Weiser 42'; Kalou (yellow card) 48'; Ibišević (yellow card) 53'; Stocker 54'	Stadium: Millerntor-Stadion; Attendance: 29,123; Referee: Deniz Aytekin

8 February 2017 Round of 16	Borussia Dortmund	1–1 (a.e.t.) (3–2 p)	Hertha BSC	Dortmund
20:45 CET (UTC+1)	Weigl (yellow card) 33'; Reus 47'; Bartra (yellow card) 78'; Castro (yellow card) 108'; Papastathopoulos (yellow card) 119' (yellow-red card) 119'	Report	Brooks (yellow card) 13'; Kalou 27'; Pekarík (yellow card) 31'; Skjelbred (yellow card) 34'; Stark (yellow card) 39'; Darida (yellow card) 52'; Mittelstädt (yellow card) 62'	Stadium: Signal Iduna Park; Attendance: 80,500; Referee: Deniz Aytekin
	Penalties
	Dembélé (penalty scored); Pulisic (penalty missed); Aubameyang (penalty scored); Castro (penalty scored)		(penalty missed) Lustenberger; (penalty missed) Darida; (penalty scored) Esswein; (penalty scored) Allagui; (penalty missed) Kalou

=== UEFA Europa League ===
==== Third qualifying round ====
28 July 2016 First leg	Hertha BSC (Germany)	1–0	(Denmark) Brøndby	Berlin, Germany
20:15 CEST (UTC+2)	Ibišević 28'	Report	Larsson (yellow card) 23'; Austin (yellow card) 85'	Stadium: Friedrich-Ludwig-Jahn-Sportpark; Attendance: 18,454; Referee: Kevin Blom (Netherlands)

4 August 2016 Second leg	Brøndby (Denmark)	3–1 (3–2 agg.)	(Germany) Hertha BSC	Brøndby, Denmark
20:15 CEST (UTC+2)	Pukki 3', 34', 52'	Report	Plattenhardt (yellow card) 24'; Ibišević 30'; Langkamp (yellow card) 66'; Darida (yellow card) 86'; Brooks (yellow card) 90+3'	Stadium: Brøndby Stadion; Attendance: 17,102; Referee: Paweł Gil (Poland)

== Statistics ==
=== Appearances and goals ===
No.	Pos	Nat	Player	Total		Bundesliga		DFB-Pokal		Europa League	
No.	Pos	Nat	Player	Apps	Goals	Apps	Goals	Apps	Goals	Apps	Goals
Goalkeepers
1	GK	(Germany) GER	Thomas Kraft	1	0	0	0	0	0	1	0
22	GK	(Norway) NOR	Rune Jarstein	38	0	34	0	3	0	1	0
29	GK	(Germany) GER	Nils Körber	0	0	0	0	0	0	0	0
Defenders
2	DF	(Slovakia) SVK	Peter Pekarík	36	1	30+1	1	3	0	2	0
15	DF	(Germany) GER	Sebastian Langkamp	32	0	26+1	0	3	0	2	0
21	DF	(Germany) GER	Marvin Plattenhardt	31	3	27	3	2	0	2	0
25	DF	(United States) USA	John Brooks	29	2	24	2	3	0	2	0
34	DF	(Germany) GER	Maximilian Mittelstädt	13	0	5+7	0	1	0	0	0
39	DF	(Germany) GER	Florian Baak	2	0	0+2	0	0	0	0	0
40	DF	(Germany) GER	Jordan Torunarigha	8	1	5+3	1	0	0	0	0
Midfielders
3	MF	(Norway) NOR	Per Ciljan Skjelbred	31	0	25+1	0	3	0	2	0
5	MF	(Germany) GER	Niklas Stark	32	1	27	1	2+1	0	0+2	0
6	MF	(Czech Republic) CZE	Vladimír Darida	29	2	21+4	2	2	0	2	0
7	FW	(Germany) GER	Alexander Esswein	30	2	15+14	2	0+1	0	0	0
9	MF	(Germany) GER	Alexander Baumjohann	0	0	0	0	0	0	0	0
10	MF	(Slovakia) SVK	Ondrej Duda	3	0	0+3	0	0	0	0	0
14	MF	(Switzerland) SUI	Valentin Stocker	20	5	14+3	4	2	1	0+1	0
18	MF	(Germany) GER	Sinan Kurt	3	0	0+2	0	0+1	0	0	0
20	MF	(Brazil) BRA	Allan	16	0	8+7	0	0+1	0	0	0
23	MF	(Germany) GER	Mitchell Weiser	21	4	12+5	2	1+1	2	2	0
24	MF	(Japan) JPN	Genki Haraguchi	34	1	23+8	1	2	0	0+1	0
28	MF	(Switzerland) SUI	Fabian Lustenberger	22	0	17+2	0	0+1	0	2	0
31	MF	(Germany) GER	Florian Kohls	0	0	0	0	0	0	0	0
33	MF	(Germany) GER	Arne Maier	1	0	0+1	0	0	0	0	0
36	MF	(Germany) GER	Julius Kade	1	0	0+1	0	0	0	0	0
Forwards
8	FW	(Ivory Coast) CIV	Salomon Kalou	31	7	25+1	6	3	1	2	0
11	FW	(Tunisia) TUN	Sami Allagui	13	1	0+12	1	0	0	0+1	0
16	FW	(Germany) GER	Julian Schieber	22	3	2+16	3	0+3	0	0+1	0
19	FW	(Bosnia and Herzegovina) BIH	Vedad Ibišević	37	14	32	12	3	0	2	2
Players transferred out during the season
13	MF	(Germany) GER	Jens Hegeler	6	0	2+4	0	0	0	0	0

Last updated: 20 May 2017
Source: Competitions

=== Goalscorers ===
Rank	No.	Pos	Nat	Name	Bundesliga	DFB-Pokal	UEFA EL	Total
1	19	FW	(Bosnia and Herzegovina)	Vedad Ibišević	12	0	2	14
2	8	FW	(Ivory Coast)	Salomon Kalou	7	1	0	8
3	14	MF	(Switzerland)	Valentin Stocker	4	1	0	5
4	23	MF	(Germany)	Mitchell Weiser	2	2	0	4
5	16	FW	(Germany)	Julian Schieber	3	0	0	3
5	21	DF	(Germany)	Marvin Plattenhardt	3	0	0	3
7	6	MF	(Czech Republic)	Vladimír Darida	2	0	0	2
7	7	MF	(Germany)	Alexander Esswein	2	0	0	2
7	25	DF	(United States)	John Brooks	2	0	0	2
10	2	DF	(Slovakia)	Peter Pekarík	1	0	0	1
10	5	MF	(Germany)	Niklas Stark	1	0	0	1
10	11	FW	(Tunisia)	Sami Allagui	1	0	0	1
10	24	MF	(Japan)	Genki Haraguchi	1	0	0	1
10	40	DF	(Germany)	Jordan Torunarigha	1	0	0	1
Own goal					1	0	0	1
Totals					43	4	2	49

Last updated: 20 May 2017

=== Clean sheets ===
Rank	No.	Pos	Nat	Name	Bundesliga	DFB-Pokal	UEFA EL	Total
1	22	GK	(Norway)	Rune Jarstein	11	1	1	13
Totals					11	1	1	13

Last updated: 13 May 2017

=== Disciplinary record ===
No.	Pos	Nat	Player	Bundesliga			DFB-Pokal			UEFA EL			Total		
No.	Pos	Nat	Player	Yellow card	(yellow card) (yellow-red card)	Red card	Yellow card	(yellow card) (yellow-red card)	Red card	Yellow card	(yellow card) (yellow-red card)	Red card	Yellow card	(yellow card) (yellow-red card)	Red card
2	DF	(Slovakia)	Peter Pekarík	3	0	0	1	0	0	0	0	0	4	0	0
3	MF	(Norway)	Per Ciljan Skjelbred	2	0	0	1	0	0	0	0	0	3	0	0
5	MF	(Germany)	Niklas Stark	6	0	0	1	0	0	0	0	0	7	0	0
6	MF	(Czech Republic)	Vladimír Darida	6	0	0	2	0	0	1	0	0	9	0	0
7	MF	(Germany)	Alexander Esswein	4	0	0	0	0	0	0	0	0	4	0	0
8	FW	(Ivory Coast)	Salomon Kalou	1	0	0	1	0	0	0	0	0	2	0	0
11	FW	(Tunisia)	Sami Allagui	2	0	0	0	0	0	0	0	0	2	0	0
14	MF	(Switzerland)	Valentin Stocker	1	0	1	0	0	0	0	0	0	1	0	1
15	DF	(Germany)	Sebastian Langkamp	5	0	0	1	0	0	1	0	0	7	0	0
16	FW	(Germany)	Julian Schieber	3	0	0	0	0	0	0	0	0	3	0	0
19	FW	(Bosnia and Herzegovina)	Vedad Ibišević	7	1	0	1	0	0	0	0	0	8	1	0
20	MF	(Brazil)	Allan	3	0	0	0	0	0	0	0	0	3	0	0
21	DF	(Germany)	Marvin Plattenhardt	3	0	0	0	0	0	1	0	0	4	0	0
22	GK	(Norway)	Rune Jarstein	1	0	0	0	0	0	0	0	0	1	0	0
23	MF	(Germany)	Mitchell Weiser	2	0	0	1	0	0	0	0	0	3	0	0
24	MF	(Japan)	Genki Haraguchi	4	0	0	0	0	0	0	0	0	4	0	0
25	DF	(United States)	John Brooks	6	0	0	1	0	0	1	0	0	8	0	0
28	DF	(Switzerland)	Fabian Lustenberger	1	0	0	0	0	0	0	0	0	1	0	0
34	DF	(Germany)	Maximilian Mittelstädt	3	1	0	1	0	0	0	0	0	4	1	0
40	DF	(Germany)	Jordan Torunarigha	1	0	0	0	0	0	0	0	0	1	0	0
Totals				63	2	1	12	0	0	4	0	0	79	2	1

Last updated: 20 May 2017
