= 2013–14 1. FC Nürnberg season =

1. FC Nürnberg
2013–14 season
- Manager: Michael Wiesinger / Gertjan Verbeek / Roger Prinzen
- Stadium: Frankenstadion
- Bundesliga: 17th (relegation)
- DFB-Pokal: 1st Round (knocked out)
- Top goalscorer: League: Drmić (17); All: Drmić (17)
- Highest home attendance: 50,000 vs Dortmund, FC Bayern and Gladbach
- Lowest home attendance: 31,084 vs Mainz
Home colours	Away colours	Third colours

The 2013–14 1. FC Nürnberg season is the 114th season in the club's football history.

== Review and events ==
In 2013–14 the club plays in the Bundesliga, the top tier of German football. It is the clubs fifth consecutive season in this league, having been promoted from the 2. Bundesliga in 2009.

The club also took part in the 2013–14 edition of the DFB-Pokal, the German Cup, where it was knocked out by 2. Bundesliga side SV Sandhausen, losing 4–3 on penalties.

== Matches ==
=== Legend ===
Win Draw Loss Postponed

=== Friendly matches ===
28 June 2013	SV Raika Längenfeld	0–9	1. FC Nürnberg	Längenfeld, Austria
				Attendance: 100

3 July 2013	1. FC Lichtenfels	0–12	1. FC Nürnberg	Lichtenfels
				Attendance: 2,700

7 July 2013	SV Seligenporten	0–2	1. FC Nürnberg	Seligenporten
				Stadium: MAR Arena; Attendance: 2,500

10 July 2013	SpVgg Bayreuth	0–4	1. FC Nürnberg	Weismain
				Stadium: Waldstadion Weismain; Referee: 2,872

13 July 2013	SpVgg Unterhaching	2–2	1. FC Nürnberg	Unterhaching
				Stadium: Generali Sportpark; Attendance: 1,500

17 July 2013	Borussia Mönchengladbach	3–0	1. FC Nürnberg	Grassau
				Attendance: 2,500

20 July 2013	Gençlerbirliği	0–1	1. FC Nürnberg	Grassau

27 July 2013	Leeds United	0–2	1. FC Nürnberg	Leeds, United Kingdom
				Stadium: Elland Road; Attendance: 9,455

7 September 2013	Rapid Wien	1–3	1. FC Nürnberg	Vienna, Austria
16:00 CEST (UTC+02)				Stadium: Gerhard Hanappi Stadium; Attendance: 6,200

=== DFB-Pokal ===
4 August 2013 1	SV Sandhausen	1–1 (a.e.t.) (4–3 p)	1. FC Nürnberg	Sandhausen
20:30 CEST (UTC+02)	Schauerte 58' (pen.)	Match report	27' Ginczek	Stadium: Hardtwaldstadion; Attendance: 7.300; Referee: Norbert Grudzinski
	Penalties
	Schauerte (penalty scored); Löning (penalty scored); Achenbach (penalty scored); Blum (penalty scored)		(penalty scored) Kiyotake; (penalty missed) Balitsch; (penalty scored) Ginczek; (penalty scored) Nilsson; (penalty missed) Plattenhardt

=== Bundesliga ===
==== League table ====
Pos	Team	Pld	W	D	L	GF	GA	GD	Pts	Qualification or relegation
14	SC Freiburg	34	9	9	16	43	61	−18	36	
15	VfB Stuttgart	34	8	8	18	49	62	−13	32	
16	Hamburger SV (O)	34	7	6	21	51	75	−24	27	Qualification for the relegation play-offs
17	1. FC Nürnberg (R)	34	5	11	18	37	70	−33	26	Relegation to 2. Bundesliga
18	Eintracht Braunschweig (R)	34	6	7	21	29	60	−31	25	Relegation to 2. Bundesliga

Source: DFB
Rules for classification: 1) points; 2) goal difference; 3) number of goals scored.
(O) Play-off winners; (R) Relegated

==== League results and fixtures ====
10 August 2013 1	1899 Hoffenheim	2–2	1. FC Nürnberg	Sinsheim
15:30 CEST (UTC+02)	Abraham 34'; Modeste 51'	Match Report	54' Frantz; 57' Ginczek	Stadium: Rhein-Neckar Arena; Attendance: 25,730; Referee: Thorsten Kinhöfer; Man of the Match: Volland

18 August 2013 2	1. FC Nürnberg	2–2	Hertha BSC	Nuremberg
15:30 CEST (UTC+02)	Drmić 40'; Kiyotake 89'	Match Report	61' Allagui; 79' (pen.) Ronny	Stadium: Frankenstadion; Attendance: 37,068; Referee: Guido Winkmann; Man of the Match: Ginczek

24 August 2013 3	Bayern Munich	2–0	1. FC Nürnberg	Munich
15:30 CEST (UTC+02)	Ribéry 69'; Robben 78'	Match Report		Stadium: Allianz Arena; Attendance: 71,000 (sell-out); Referee: Christian Dingert; Man of the Match: Ribéry

31 August 2013 4	1. FC Nürnberg	0–1	FC Augsburg	Nuremberg
15:30 CEST (UTC+02)		Match Report	84' Vogt	Stadium: Frankenstadion; Attendance: 37,239; Referee: Michael Weiner; Man of the Match: Schäfer

15 September 2013 5	Eintracht Braunschweig	1–1	1. FC Nürnberg	Braunschweig
17:30 CEST (UTC+02)	Elabdellaoui 70'	Match Report	28' Hloušek	Stadium: Eintracht-Stadion; Attendance: 22,570; Referee: Marco Fritz; Man of the Match: Schäfer

21 September 2013 6	1. FC Nürnberg	1–1	Borussia Dortmund	Nuremberg
15:30 CEST (UTC+02)	Nilsson 50'	Match Report	37' Schmelzer	Stadium: Frankenstadion; Attendance: 50,000 (sell-out); Referee: Knut Kircher; Man of the Match: Nilsson

29 September 2013 7	Werder Bremen	3–3	1. FC Nürnberg	Bremen
15:30 CEST (UTC+02)	Dabanli 8' (o.g.); Elia 34', 66'	Match Report	44' Kiyotake; 53' Drmić; 70' Hloušek	Stadium: Weserstadion; Attendance: 40,048; Referee: Tobias Stieler; Man of the Match: Elia

6 October 2013 8	1. FC Nürnberg	0–5	Hamburger SV	Nuremberg
15:30 CEST (UTC+02)		Match Report	17' Van der Vaart; 59', 63', 67' Lasogga; 74' Arslan	Stadium: Frankenstadion; Attendance: 38,042; Referee: Markus Schmidt; Man of the Match: Lasogga

19 October 2013 9	Eintracht Frankfurt	1–1	1. FC Nürnberg	Frankfurt
15:30 CEST (UTC+02)	Kadlec 50'	Match Report	86' Drmić	Stadium: Commerzbank-Arena; Attendance: 50,200; Referee: Christian Dingert; Man of the Match: Kadlec

25 October 2013 10	VfB Stuttgart	1–1	1. FC Nürnberg	Stuttgart
20:30 CEST (UTC+02)	Ibišević 3' (pen.)	Match Report	6' Drmić	Stadium: Mercedes-Benz Arena; Attendance: 48,460; Referee: Guido Winkmann; Man of the Match: Maxim

2 November 2013 11	1. FC Nürnberg	0–3	SC Freiburg	Nuremberg
15:30 CET (UTC+01)		Match Report	57' Klaus; 79' Darida; 88' Mehmedi	Stadium: Frankenstadion; Attendance: 37,069; Referee: Manuel Gräfe; Man of the Match: Baumann

9 November 2013 12	Borussia Mönchengladbach	3–1	1. FC Nürnberg	Mönchengladbach
18:30 CET (UTC+01)	Arango 72'; Stark 75' (o.g.); Herrmann 87'	Match Report	21' Drmić	Stadium: Borussia-Park; Attendance: 53,235; Referee: Christian Dingert; Man of the Match: Arango

23 November 2013 13	1. FC Nürnberg	1–1	VfL Wolfsburg	Nuremberg
15:30 CET (UTC+01)	Ginczek 72'	Match Report	39' Arnold	Stadium: Frankenstadion; Attendance: 35,678; Referee: Tobias Welz; Man of the Match: Arnold

30 November 2013 14	Bayer Leverkusen	3–0	1. FC Nürnberg	Leverkusen
15:30 CET (UTC+01)	Son 36', 76'; Kießling 47'	Match Report		Stadium: BayArena; Attendance: 27,395; Referee: Jochen Drees; Man of the Match: Son

6 December 2013 15	1. FC Nürnberg	1–1	Mainz 05	Nuremberg
20:30 CET (UTC+01)	Nilsson 5'	Match Report	75' Okazaki	Stadium: Frankenstadion; Attendance: 31,084; Referee: Manuel Gräfe; Man of the Match: Schäfer

14 December 2013 16	Hannover 96	3–3	1. FC Nürnberg	Hannover
15:30 CET (UTC+01)	Bittencourt 60'; Diouf 87', 90'	Match Report	30' Hloušek; 38' Drmić; 41' Nilsson	Stadium: Niedersachsenstadion; Attendance: 38,100; Referee: Thorsten Kinhöfer; Man of the Match: Diouf

21 December 2013 17	1. FC Nürnberg	0–0	Schalke 04	Nuremberg
18:30 CET (UTC+01)		Match Report		Stadium: Frankenstadion; Attendance: 42,687; Referee: Florian Meyer; Man of the Match: Frantz

25 January 2014 18	1. FC Nürnberg	4–0	1899 Hoffenheim	Nuremberg
15:30 CET (UTC+01)	Chandler 23'; Drmić 41', 70'; Ginczek 49'	Match Report		Stadium: Frankenstadion; Attendance: 36,079; Referee: Knut Kircher; Man of the Match: Pinola

2 February 2014 19	Hertha BSC	1–3	1. FC Nürnberg	Berlin
15:30 CET (UTC+01)	Ramos 4'	Match Report	20' Feulner; 68', 90' (pen.) Drmić	Stadium: Olympiastadion; Attendance: 37,438; Referee: Michael Weiner; Man of the Match: Drmić

8 February 2014 20	1. FC Nürnberg	0–2	Bayern Munich	Nuremberg
15:30 CET (UTC+01)		Match Report	18' Mandžukić; 49' Lahm	Stadium: Frankenstadion; Attendance: 50,000 (sell-out); Referee: Tobias Welz; Man of the Match: Mandžukić

16 February 2014 21	FC Augsburg	0–1	1. FC Nürnberg	Augsburg
15:30 CET (UTC+01)		Match Report	65' Drmić	Stadium: SGL arena Attendance: 30,660 (sell-out); Referee: Felix Brych; Man of the Match: Drmić

22 February 2014 22	1. FC Nürnberg	2–1	Eintracht Braunschweig	Nuremberg
15:30 CET (UTC+01)	Kiyotake 46'; Pekhart 47'	Match Report	34' Kumbela	Stadium: Frankenstadion; Attendance: 36,657; Referee: Daniel Siebert; Man of the Match: Schäfer

1 March 2014 23	Borussia Dortmund	3–0	1. FC Nürnberg	Dortmund
15:30 CET (UTC+01)	Hummels 51'; Lewandowski 64'; Mkhitaryan 83'	Match Report		Stadium: Westfalenstadion; Attendance: 80,645 (sell-out); Referee: Christian Dingert; Man of the Match: Mkhitaryan

8 March 2014 24	1. FC Nürnberg	0–2	Werder Bremen	Nuremberg
18:30 CET (UTC+01)		Match Report	39' Di Santo; 68' Bargfrede	Stadium: Frankenstadion; Attendance: 40,608; Referee: Manuel Gräfe; Man of the Match: Di Santo

16 March 2014 25	Hamburger SV	2–1	1. FC Nürnberg	Hamburg
15:30 CET (UTC+01)	Çalhanoğlu 80'; Frantz 86' (o.g.)	Match Report	90' Drmić	Stadium: Volksparkstadion; Attendance: 52,183; Referee: Marco Fritz; Man of the Match: Çalhanoğlu

23 March 2014 26	1. FC Nürnberg	2–5	Eintracht Frankfurt	Nuremberg
15:30 CET (UTC+01)	Drmić 64'; Campaña 72'	Match Report	21' Barnetta; 49', 88' Joselu; 53' Madlung; 90' Kadlec	Stadium: Frankenstadion; Attendance: 40,079; Referee: Knut Kircher; Man of the Match: Aigner

26 March 2014 27	1. FC Nürnberg	2–0	VfB Stuttgart	Nuremberg
20:00 CET (UTC+01)	Drmić 43', 54'	Match Report		Stadium: Frankenstadion; Attendance: 38,188; Referee: Tobias Welz; Man of the Match: Drmić

29 March 2014 28	SC Freiburg	3–2	1. FC Nürnberg	Freiburg
18:30 CET (UTC+01)	Krmaš 23'; Mehmedi 53' (pen.); Klaus 65'	Match Report	7' Pogatetz; 45' (pen.) Drmić	Stadium: Dreisamstadion; Attendance: 24,000 (sell-out); Referee: Jochen Drees; Man of the Match: Klaus

5 April 2014 29	1. FC Nürnberg	0–2	Borussia Mönchengladbach	Nuremberg
15:30 CEST (UTC+02)		Match Report	18' Arango; 79' (pen.) Kruse	Stadium: Frankenstadion; Attendance: 50,000 (sell-out); Referee: Tobias Stieler; Man of the Match: Schäfer

12 April 2014 30	VfL Wolfsburg	4–1	1. FC Nürnberg	Wolfsburg
15:30 CEST (UTC+02)	Olić 19'; Perišić 22', 82'; Malanda 69'	Match Report	8' Feulner	Stadium: Volkswagen-Arena; Attendance: 28,431; Referee: Bastian Dankert; Man of the Match: De Bruyne

20 April 2014 31	1. FC Nürnberg	1–4	Bayer Leverkusen	Nuremberg
15:30 CEST (UTC+02)	Plattenhardt 26'	Match Report	16', 80' Spahić; 48' Boenisch; 87' Hilbert	Stadium: Frankenstadion; Attendance: 40,514; Referee: Marco Fritz; Man of the Match: Spahić

26 April 2014 32	Mainz 05	2–0	1. FC Nürnberg	Mainz
15:30 CEST (UTC+02)	Okazaki 30'; Moritz 44'	Match Report		Stadium: Coface Arena; Attendance: 33,507; Referee: Knut Kircher; Man of the Match: Okazaki

3 May 2014 33	1. FC Nürnberg	0–2	Hannover 96	Nuremberg
15:30 CEST (UTC+02)		Match Report	5' Huszti; 51' Schmiedebach	Stadium: Frankenstadion; Attendance: 46,014; Referee: Manuel Gräfe; Man of the Match: Schmiedebach

10 May 2014 34	Schalke 04	4–1	1. FC Nürnberg	Gelsenkirchen
15:30 CEST (UTC+02)	J. Matip 6'; Neustädter 45'; Draxler 75'; Obasi 90'	Match Report	90' Drmić	Stadium: Veltins-Arena; Attendance: 61,973 (sell-out); Referee: Felix Zwayer; Man of the Match: M. Meyer

=== Overall ===
Matches played	34
Matches won	5
Matches drawn	11
Matches lost	18
Goals scored	37
Goals conceded	70
Goal difference	−33
Clean sheets	4
Yellow cards	
Red cards	4
Best result(s)	4–0 vs Hoffenheim
Worst result(s)	0–5 vs Hamburg
Points earned	26/102
