= Niklas Stark =

German footballer (born 1995)

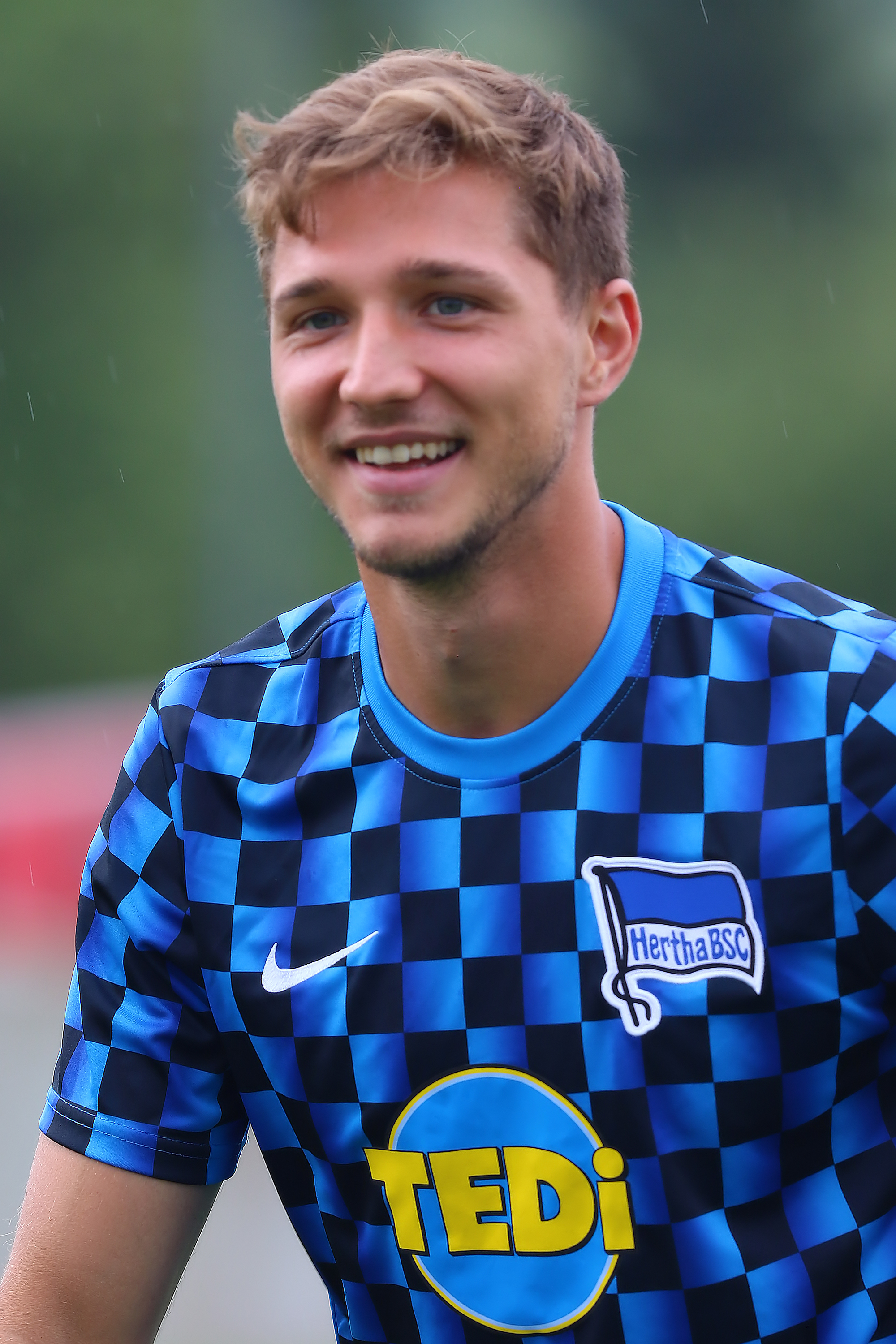
- Stark with Hertha BSC in 2019

Personal information
- Birth name: Niklas Stark
- Date of birth: 14 April 1995 (age 31)
- Place of birth: Neustadt an der Aisch, Germany
- Height: 1.90 m (6 ft 3 in)
- Positions: Centre-back; defensive midfielder

Team information
- Current team: Werder Bremen
- Number: 4

Youth career
- 1998–2002: FSV Ipsheim
- 2002–2004: TSV Neustadt/Aisch
- 2004–2013: 1. FC Nürnberg

Senior career*
Years	Team	Apps	(Gls)
2013–2015	1. FC Nürnberg	54	(3)
2014–2015	1. FC Nürnberg II	3	(0)
2015–2022	Hertha BSC	176	(7)
2022–	Werder Bremen	85	(2)

International career^{‡}
2011–2012	Germany U17	3	(0)
2012–2013	Germany U18	3	(0)
2013–2014	Germany U19	13	(3)
2015	Germany U20	7	(3)
2014–2017	Germany U21	18	(2)
2019–2020	Germany	2	(0)
Medal record
Men's football
Representing Germany
UEFA European Under-21 Championship
Winner	2017 Poland
UEFA European Under-19 Championship
Winner	2014 Hungary
- * Club domestic league appearances and goals as of 26 April 2026 (UTC) ‡ National team caps and goals as of 21:03, 7 October 2020 (UTC)

Niklas Stark (German pronunciation: [ˈnɪklas ʃtaʁk]; born 14 April 1995) is a German professional footballer who plays as a centre-back or defensive midfielder for Bundesliga club Werder Bremen.

== Club career ==
=== 1. FC Nürnberg ===
Stark made his Bundesliga debut on 27 April 2013 in a 2–1 loss to 1899 Hoffenheim. He made two more appearances for 1. FC Nürnberg in the 2012–13 season. In the 2013–14 season, Stark made appearances for both the first team and second team. He made 21 appearances for the first team and two appearances. He did not score for either team. Again, during the 2014–15 season, Stark made appearances for both the first and second teams. He scored two goals in 26 appearances for the first team. He failed to score in one appearance for the second team. His final match in a Nürnberg jersey proved to be a 2–1 loss to VfL Bochum on 23 August 2015 as he transferred to Hertha BSC the following day. He had scored a goal in four league appearances for Nürnberg in the 2015–16 season. He had also made a German Cup appearance prior to the transfer.

=== Hertha BSC ===
Stark signed a four-year contract for Hertha BSC on 24 August 2015. He made his debut on 12 September in a 2–1 win over VfB Stuttgart, when he came off the bench for Salomon Kalou in the 73rd minute. He was able to quickly establish himself as a starter, but suffered a setback in October 2015 due to injury, only returning to the starting eleven in February 2016. He scored his first Bundesliga goal for Hertha on 11 March 2016 in a 2–0 victory against Schalke 04.

In the following seasons he was also part of the regular team and also made his first European appearances, as Hertha were able to qualify twice for the UEFA Europa League, but both times eliminated from the competition early. At Hertha, he mostly appeared as a centre-back but also as a defensive midfielder.

On 31 March 2022, it was announced that Stark's expiring contract would not be renewed, and that he would leave Hertha as a free agent after the 2021–22 season.

=== Werder Bremen ===
On 28 May 2022, Werder Bremen, newly promoted to the Bundesliga, announced the signing of Stark for the 2022–23 season. He reportedly signed a four-year contract.

== International career ==
On 15 March 2019, Stark was called up for the Germany national team for the first time in his career by national team coach Joachim Löw. He made his debut on 19 November 2019 in a Euro 2020 qualifier against Northern Ireland. He substituted Lukas Klostermann in the 65th minute.

== Career statistics ==
=== Club ===
As of match played 26 April 2026

Appearances and goals by club, season and competition
Club	Season	League			Cup		Continental		Other		Total	
Club	Season	Division	Apps	Goals	Apps	Goals	Apps	Goals	Apps	Goals	Apps	Goals
1. FC Nürnberg	2012–13	Bundesliga	3	0	0	0	—		—		3	0
1. FC Nürnberg	2013–14	Bundesliga	21	0	0	0	–		—		21	0
1. FC Nürnberg	2014–15	2. Bundesliga	26	2	1	0	–		—		27	2
1. FC Nürnberg	2015–16	2. Bundesliga	4	1	1	0	–		—		5	1
1. FC Nürnberg	Total		54	3	2	0	0	0	0	0	56	3
1. FC Nürnberg II	2013–14	Regionalliga Bayern	2	0	–		–		—		2	0
1. FC Nürnberg II	2014–15	Regionalliga Bayern	1	0	–		–		—		1	0
1. FC Nürnberg II	Total		3	0	0	0	0	0	0	0	3	0
Hertha BSC	2015–16	Bundesliga	21	2	2	0	—		—		23	2
Hertha BSC	2016–17	Bundesliga	27	1	3	0	2	0	—		32	1
Hertha BSC	2017–18	Bundesliga	26	1	1	1	4	0	—		31	2
Hertha BSC	2018–19	Bundesliga	22	1	3	0	—		—		25	1
Hertha BSC	2019–20	Bundesliga	21	1	3	0	–		—		24	1
Hertha BSC	2021–22	Bundesliga	33	0	1	0	–		—		34	0
Hertha BSC	2021–22	Bundesliga	26	1	2	0	–		2 (Note: Appearances in relegation play-offs)	0	34	0
Hertha BSC	Total		176	7	15	1	6	0	2	0	199	8
Werder Bremen	2022–23	Bundesliga	27	0	1	0	—		—		28	0
Werder Bremen	2023–24	Bundesliga	17	2	1	0	—		—		18	2
Werder Bremen	2024–25	Bundesliga	26	0	3	0	—		—		29	0
Werder Bremen	2025–26	Bundesliga	14	0	1	0	—		—		15	0
Werder Bremen	Total		85	2	6	0	—		—		91	2
Career total			318	12	23	1	6	0	2	0	348	13

=== International ===
As of 7 October 2020

Appearances and goals by national team and year
National team	Year	Apps	Goals
Germany	2019	1	0
Germany	2020	1	0
Total		2	0

== Honours ==
Germany

- UEFA European Under-19 Championship: 2014
- UEFA European Under-21 Championship: 2017

Individual

- Fritz Walter Medal U19 Gold: 2014
- 2014 UEFA European Under-19 Championship: Team of the Tournament
- UEFA European Under-21 Championship Team of the Tournament: 2017
