= Maximilian Mittelstädt =

German footballer

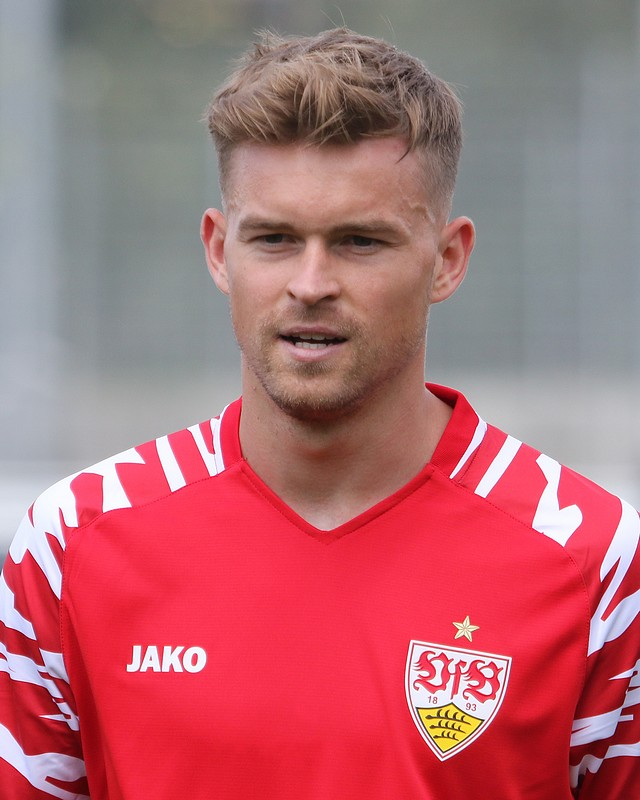
- Mittelstädt with VfB Stuttgart in 2023

Personal information
- Full name: Maximilian Mittelstädt
- Date of birth: 18 March 1997 (age 29)
- Place of birth: Berlin, Germany
- Height: 1.80 m (5 ft 11 in)
- Positions: Left-back; centre-back

Team information
- Current team: VfB Stuttgart
- Number: 7

Youth career
- SC Staaken
- –2012: Hertha Zehlendorf
- 2012–2015: Hertha BSC

Senior career*
Years	Team	Apps	(Gls)
2015	Hertha BSC II	24	(4)
2015–2023	Hertha BSC	145	(2)
2023–	VfB Stuttgart	101	(10)

International career^{‡}
2014–2015	Germany U18	5	(0)
2015–2016	Germany U19	8	(0)
2016–2018	Germany U20	6	(1)
2018–2019	Germany U21	5	(1)
2024–	Germany	18	(1)
Medal record
Representing Germany
UEFA European Under-21 Championship
Runner-up	2019
- * Club domestic league appearances and goals as of 17:31, 31 October 2026 (UTC) ‡ National team caps and goals as of 21:50, 16 November 2026 (UTC)

Maximilian Mittelstädt (German pronunciation: [maksiˈmiːli̯aːn ˈmɪtl̩ˌʃtɛːt]; born 18 March 1997) is a German professional footballer who plays as a left-back or centre-back for Bundesliga club VfB Stuttgart and the Germany national team.

== Club career ==
Mittelstädt made his first footballing steps at the age of five in the youth team of SC Staaken before moving to Hertha 03 Zehlendorf. In 2012, he transferred to the youth team of Hertha BSC.

Mittelstädt made his professional league debut on 2 March 2016 against Eintracht Frankfurt, coming as a substitute in the 90th minute for Salomon Kalou. On 30 October 2018, he scored his first competitive goal for Hertha BSC in a 2–0 away victory in the DFB-Pokal against SV Darmstadt 98.

On 7 June 2023, Mittelstädt signed for VfB Stuttgart on a three-year contract. In the 2023–24 season, he achieved the highest dribbling success rate in the Bundesliga at 61%, playing a crucial role in his club's qualification for the UEFA Champions League. On 31 August 2024, Mittelstädt extended his contract with VfB Stuttgart until June 2028.

== International career ==
Mittelstädt was in the squad of the Germany U19 during the 2015–16 season. In March 2024, Julian Nagelsmann called him up for the German national team ahead of the friendly matches against France and the Netherlands. Mittelstädt made his debut on 23 March against the former. Three days later, he scored his first goal in a 2–1 victory against the Netherlands. Mittelstädt was named in Germany's squad for UEFA Euro 2024.

== Career statistics ==
=== Club ===
As of match played 3 November 2026

Appearances and goals by club, season and competition
Club	Season	League			DFB-Pokal		Europe		Other		Total	
Club	Season	Division	Apps	Goals	Apps	Goals	Apps	Goals	Apps	Goals	Apps	Goals
Hertha BSC II	2015–16	Regionalliga Nordost	10	3	—		—		—		10	3
Hertha BSC II	2016–17	Regionalliga Nordost	7	0	—		—		—		7	0
Hertha BSC II	2017–18	Regionalliga Nordost	6	1	—		—		—		6	1
Hertha BSC II	2018–19	Regionalliga Nordost	1	0	—		—		—		1	0
Hertha BSC II	Total		24	4	—		—		—		24	4
Hertha BSC	2015–16	Bundesliga	3	0	0	0	—		—		3	0
Hertha BSC	2016–17	Bundesliga	12	0	1	0	0	0	—		13	0
Hertha BSC	2017–18	Bundesliga	11	0	0	0	3 (Note: Appearances in UEFA Europa League)	0	—		14	0
Hertha BSC	2018–19	Bundesliga	25	1	3	2	—		—		28	3
Hertha BSC	2019–20	Bundesliga	26	1	2	1	—		—		28	2
Hertha BSC	2020–21	Bundesliga	27	0	1	0	—		—		28	0
Hertha BSC	2021–22	Bundesliga	24	0	1	0	—		—		25	0
Hertha BSC	2022–23	Bundesliga	17	0	0	0	—		—		17	0
Hertha BSC	Total		145	2	9	3	3	0	—		157	5
VfB Stuttgart	2023–24	Bundesliga	31	2	3	0	—		—		34	2
VfB Stuttgart	2024–25	Bundesliga	31	1	4	0	8 (Note: Appearances in UEFA Champions League)	0	1 (Note: Appearance in DFL/Franz Beckenbauer Supercup)	0	44	1
VfB Stuttgart	2025–26	Bundesliga	32	6	6	0	11	1	1	0	50	7
VfB Stuttgart	2026–27	Bundesliga	7	1	2	0	3	0	—		12	1
VfB Stuttgart	Total		101	10	15	0	22	1	2	0	140	11
Career total			270	16	24	3	25	1	2	0	321	20

=== International ===
As of match played 16 November 2026

Appearances and goals by national team and year
National team	Year	Apps	Goals
Germany	2024	11	1
Germany	2025	4	0
Germany	2026	3	0
Total		18	1

As of match played 23 March 2025
Scores and results list Germany's goal tally first.

List of international goals scored by Maximilian Mittelstädt
No.	Date	Venue	Cap	Opponent	Score	Result	Competition
1	26 March 2024	Waldstadion, Frankfurt, Germany	2	Netherlands	1–1	2–1	Friendly

== Honours ==
- VfB Stuttgart: 2024–25 DFB-Pokal
- Individual: Fritz Walter Medal U19 Bronze (2016)
