= Marvin Plattenhardt =

German footballer (born 1992)

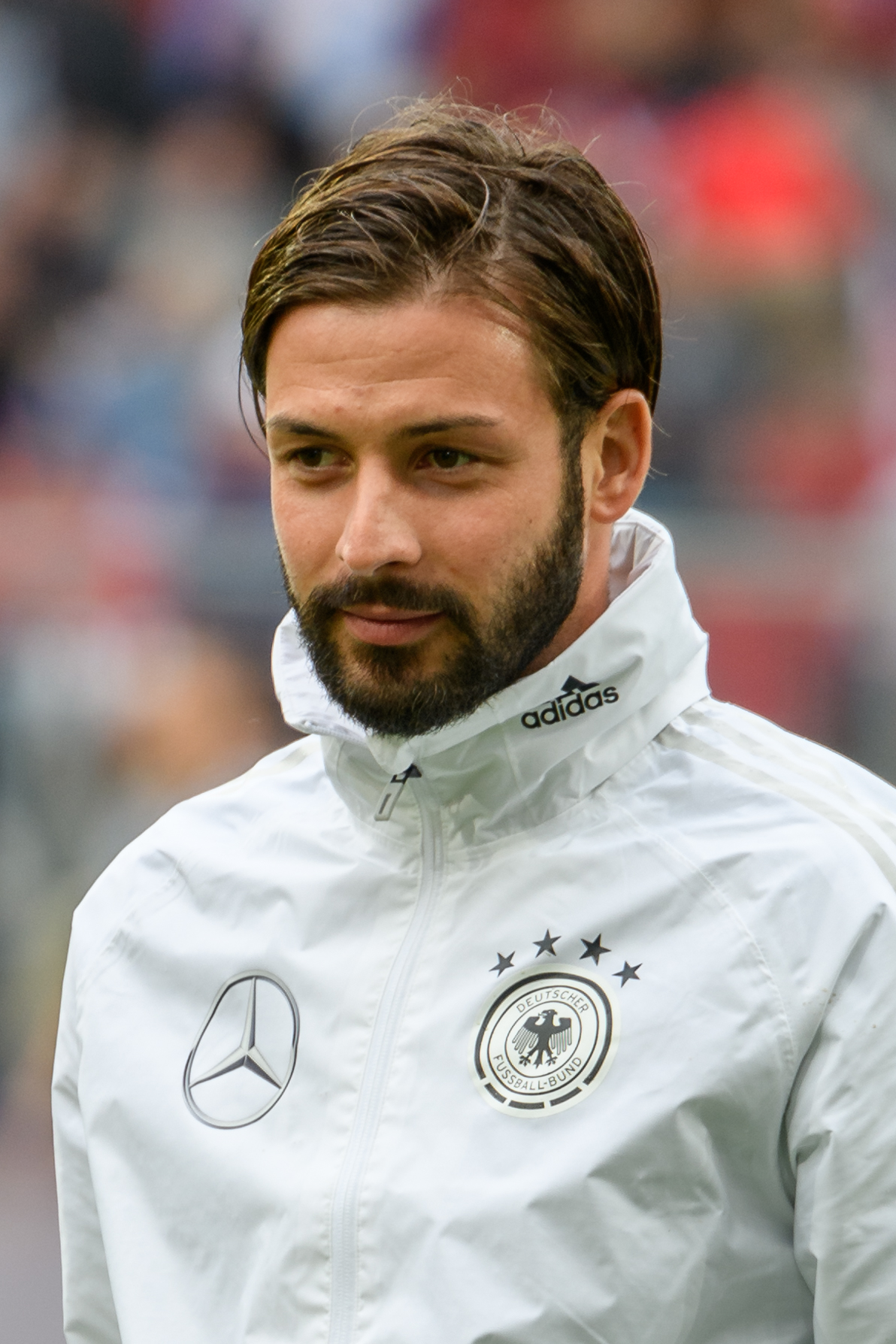
- Plattenhardt with Germany at the 2018 FIFA World Cup

Personal information
- Full name: Marvin Plattenhardt
- Date of birth: 26 January 1992 (age 34)
- Place of birth: Filderstadt, Germany
- Height: 1.81 m (5 ft 11 in)
- Position: Left-back

Youth career
- 1999–2005: 1. FC Frickenhausen
- 2005–2006: FV Nürtingen
- 2006–2008: SSV Reutlingen
- 2008–2010: 1. FC Nürnberg

Senior career*
Years	Team	Apps	(Gls)
2010–2013	1. FC Nürnberg II	46	(0)
2010–2014	1. FC Nürnberg	63	(2)
2014–2023	Hertha BSC	215	(6)
2014	Hertha BSC II	2	(0)
Total		326	(8)

International career
2008–2009	Germany U17	24	(0)
2009–2010	Germany U18	6	(0)
2010–2011	Germany U19	12	(0)
2011–2013	Germany U20	7	(0)
2012–2014	Germany U21	7	(0)
2017–2018	Germany	7	(0)
Medal record
Representing Germany
UEFA European Under-17 Championship
Winner	2009
FIFA Confederations Cup
Winner	2017
- * Club domestic league appearances and goals

Marvin Plattenhardt (born 26 January 1992) is a German former professional footballer who played as a left-back, spending most of his career with Hertha BSC.

== Club career ==
=== 1. FC Nürnberg ===
Plattenhardt started playing for 1. FC Nürnberg II during the 2009–10 season in the Regionalliga Süd. He made nine appearances during the 2009–10 season. He went on to make 21 appearances during the 2010–11 season, eight appearances during the 2011–12 season, and eight appearances during the 2012–13 season. He also played for the first team. He made nine appearances during the 2010–11 season, 11 appearances during the 2011–12 season, 14 appearances during the 2012–13, and 32 appearances during the 2013–14 season.

=== Hertha BSC ===
On 20 May 2014, he signed a three-year contract with Hertha BSC. During the 2014–15 season, he made 15 appearances for the first team and two appearances for reserve team. He scored his first goal for the club on 12 December 2015, scoring a free kick in a 4–0 win away to Darmstadt 98. He finished the 2015–16 season with 37 appearances. On 11 March 2017, Plattenhardt scored the winning goal in a 2–1 win over Borussia Dortmund, his seventh competitive league goal, all of which came from free kicks. He finished the 2016–17 season with 31 appearances. He finished the 2017–18 season with 38 appearances. Plattenhardt scored the winning goal in Hertha's 2022 relegation playoff with Hamburger SV, rescuing the team from demotion to the 2. Bundesliga.

Plattenhardt announced his retirement from playing in September 2024.

== International career ==
Plattenhardt was first called up to the senior national team in 2017, for the friendly against Denmark on 6 June 2017, for the 2018 World Cup qualification match against San Marino on 10 June 2017 and for the 2017 Confederations Cup to be held from 17 June to 2 July 2017, making his debut in a friendly match against Denmark on 6 June 2017. Plattenhardt was named in Germany's final 23-man squad for the 2018 FIFA World Cup by Germany manager Joachim Löw on 4 June 2018. On 17 June, he made his World Cup debut during their 1–0 defeat in the opening match against Mexico and played for 78 minutes as he was replaced by Mario Gómez in 79th minute.

== Career statistics ==
=== Club ===
Appearances and goals by club, season and competition
Club	Season	League			National cup		Europe		Other		Total		Ref.
Club	Season	Division	Apps	Goals	Apps	Goals	Apps	Goals	Apps	Goals	Apps	Goals	Ref.
1. FC Nürnberg II	2009–10	Regionalliga Süd	9	0	—		—		—		9	0	
1. FC Nürnberg II	2010–11	Regionalliga Süd	21	0	—		—		—		21	0	
1. FC Nürnberg II	2011–12	Regionalliga Süd	8	0	—		—		—		8	0	
1. FC Nürnberg II	2012–13	Regionalliga Bayern	8	0	—		—		—		8	0	
1. FC Nürnberg II	Total		46	0	0	0	0	0	0	0	46	0	—
1. FC Nürnberg	2010–11	Bundesliga	9	0	0	0	—		—		9	0	
1. FC Nürnberg	2011–12	Bundesliga	9	0	2	0	—		—		11	0	
1. FC Nürnberg	2012–13	Bundesliga	14	1	0	0	—		—		14	1	
1. FC Nürnberg	2013–14	Bundesliga	31	1	1	0	—		—		32	1	
1. FC Nürnberg	Total		63	2	3	0	0	0	0	0	66	2	—
Hertha BSC II	2014–15	Regionalliga Nordost	2	0	—		—		—		2	0	
Hertha BSC	2014–15	Bundesliga	15	0	0	0	—		—		15	0	
Hertha BSC	2015–16	Bundesliga	33	2	4	0	—		—		37	2	
Hertha BSC	2016–17	Bundesliga	27	3	2	0	2 (Note: Appearances in UEFA Europa League)	0	—		31	3	
Hertha BSC	2017–18	Bundesliga	33	0	2	0	3	0	—		38	0	
Hertha BSC	2018–19	Bundesliga	22	1	3	1	—		—		25	2	
Hertha BSC	2019–20	Bundesliga	17	0	2	0	—		—		19	0	
Hertha BSC	2020–21	Bundesliga	16	0	1	0	—		—		17	0	
Hertha BSC	2021–22	Bundesliga	21	0	2	0	—		2 (Note: Appearances in Bundesliga relegation play-offs)	1	25	1	
Hertha BSC	2022–23	Bundesliga	31	0	1	0	—		—		32	0	
Hertha BSC	Total		215	6	17	1	5	0	2	1	239	8	—
Career total			326	8	20	1	5	0	2	1	353	10	—

=== International ===
As of match played 17 June 2018

Appearances and goals by national team and year
National team	Year	Apps	Goals
Germany	2017	5	0
Germany	2018	2	0
Total		7	0

== Honours ==
Germany U17

- UEFA European Under-17 Championship: 2009

Germany

- FIFA Confederations Cup: 2017
