= Rune Jarstein =

Norwegian footballer (born 1984)

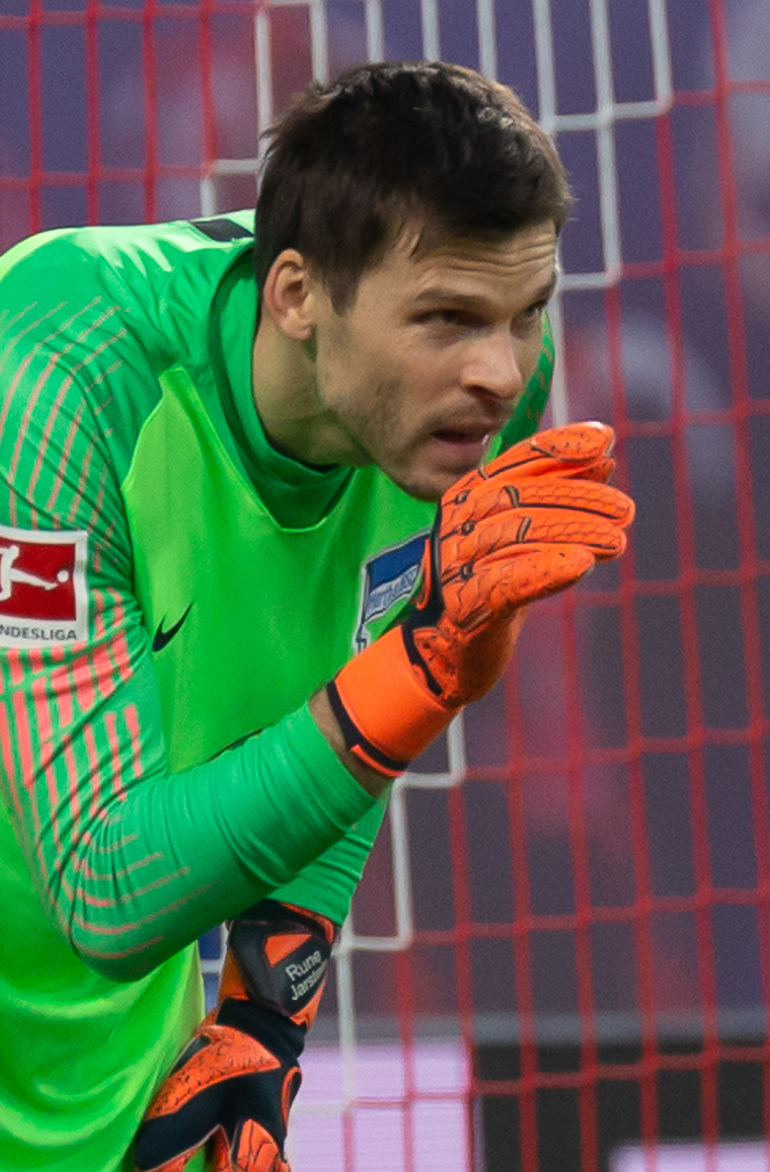
- Jarstein playing for Hertha BSC in 2019

Personal information
- Full name: Rune Almenning Jarstein
- Date of birth: 29 September 1984 (age 42)
- Place of birth: Porsgrunn, Norway
- Height: 1.92 m (6 ft 4 in)
- Position: Goalkeeper

Team information
- Current team: Herkules

Youth career
- Herkules

Senior career*
Years	Team	Apps	(Gls)
2002–2007	Odd Grenland	72	(0)
2007–2010	Rosenborg	51	(0)
2010–2013	Viking	116	(0)
2014–2023	Hertha BSC	164	(0)
2015	Hertha BSC II	1	(0)
2024–	Herkules	16	(56)

International career
2007–2021	Norway	72	(0)
- * Club domestic league appearances and goals as of 19:14, 18 June 2024 (UTC)

Rune Almenning Jarstein (born 29 September 1984) is a Norwegian professional footballer who plays as a goalkeeper for Herkules.

== Club career ==
=== Early career ===
Jarstein was born in Porsgrunn. He started his career playing for local team Herkules in Skien. During his teens, he had trials at several European top clubs, including Manchester United and Bayern Munich.

Jarstein made his debut in the Norwegian top division, aged 18, playing for Odd in 2002. In 2007, after Odd Grenland had been relegated to the Norwegian First Division, he was transferred to Rosenborg.

On 8 March 2010, Jarstein signed for Viking, after losing his starting position to Daniel Örlund. His contract with Viking expired after the 2013 season.

=== Hertha BSC ===
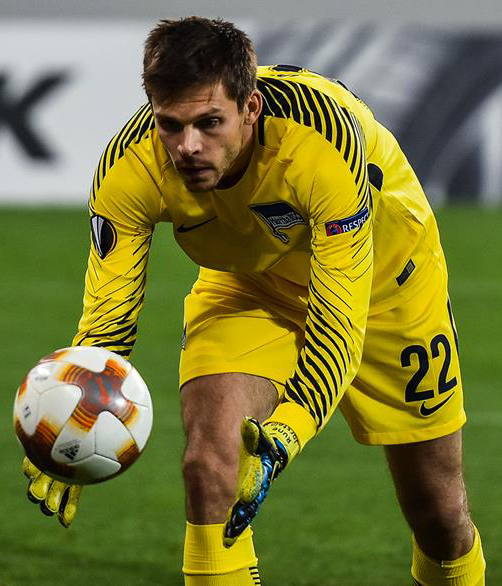
Jarstein playing for Hertha BSC in 2017

On 17 December 2013, he signed a two-year contract for German club Hertha BSC. Throughout the 2015–16 season, he was the first-choice goalkeeper as Thomas Kraft was injured after sustaining a shoulder injury. This gave second-choice goalkeeper Jarstein the chance to show his ability, and he took the keeper spot for the rest of the season. On 18 December 2015, after his successful spell, he was rewarded with a contract extension of three and a half years at Hertha to the end of the 2018–19 season.

Jarstein remained Hertha's first choice goalkeeper over Kraft. Only during the UEFA Europa League qualification round, did Kraft and Jarstein switch positions, with Jarstein in goal for the home leg and Kraft in goal for the away leg. In an away match against Borussia Dortmund, Jarstein's performance was met with high praise after several outstanding saves and after saving a penalty from Dortmund striker Pierre-Emerick Aubameyang, earning Hertha a point with a 1–1 draw.

On 12 April 2018, Jarstein signed a new deal, keeping him at the club beyond 2019 when his current contract was about to expire. On the opening day of the 2018–19 season, Jarstein saved an 83rd-minute penalty from Mikael Ishak, in a 1–0 win over 1. FC Nürnberg.

Ahead of the 2020–21 season, Alexander Schwolow was signed as the new starter in goal under head coach Bruno Labbadia. When manager Pál Dárdai returned to relegation-threatened Hertha in January 2021, Jarstein regained his starting position in goal. He played eight league games before being sidelined in April 2021 after contracting COVID-19, which required medical treatment in a hospital.

On 1 July 2023, Jarstein left Hertha BSC due to arguments between him and the club. On 28 November 2023, he announced his retirement from football.

=== Return to Herkules ===
On 23 April 2024, Jarstein came out of retirement and announced that he would rejoin his boyhood club Herkules.

== International career ==
Jarstein was capped 30 times at youth level for Norway.

On 23 August 2007, he made his debut for the Norway national team, playing 45 minutes in a 2–1 win over Argentina. When Jon Knudsen was injured in 2011, Jarstein became the new first-choice goalkeeper at the national team, and was the first choice until the 2014 FIFA World Cup qualification started in September 2012, when Espen Bugge Pettersen played the match against Iceland. Jarstein was however back in the starting line-up in the next match against Slovenia, and in January 2013 the goalkeeper coach on the national team Frode Grodås stated that Jarstein was the first-choice goalkeeper.

== Career statistics ==
=== Club ===
Appearances and goals by club, season and competition
Club	Season	League			National cup (Note: Includes Norwegian Cup and German Cup.)		Continental (Note: Includes UEFA Europa League and UEFA Intertoto Cup.)		Total	
Club	Season	Division	Apps	Goals	Apps	Goals	Apps	Goals	Apps	Goals
Odd Grenland	2002	Tippeligaen	2	0	2	0	—		4	0
Odd Grenland	2003	Tippeligaen	4	0	3	0	—		7	0
Odd Grenland	2004	Tippeligaen	0	0	0	0	—		0	0
Odd Grenland	2005	Tippeligaen	16	0	4	0	—		20	0
Odd Grenland	2006	Tippeligaen	25	0	1	0	—		26	0
Odd Grenland	2007	Tippeligaen	25	0	4	0	—		29	0
Odd Grenland	Total		72	0	14	0	—		86	0
Rosenborg	2008	Tippeligaen	23	0	0	0	9	0	32	0
Rosenborg	2009	Tippeligaen	28	0	4	0	4	0	36	0
Rosenborg	Total		51	0	4	0	13	0	68	0
Viking	2010	Tippeligaen	26	0	5	0	—		31	0
Viking	2011	Tippeligaen	30	0	5	0	—		35	0
Viking	2012	Tippeligaen	30	0	2	0	—		32	0
Viking	2013	Tippeligaen	30	0	1	0	—		31	0
Viking	Total		116	0	13	0	—		129	0
Hertha BSC	2013–14	Bundesliga	1	0	0	0	—		1	0
Hertha BSC	2014–15	Bundesliga	1	0	0	0	—		1	0
Hertha BSC	2015–16	Bundesliga	29	0	4	0	—		33	0
Hertha BSC	2016–17	Bundesliga	34	0	3	0	1	0	38	0
Hertha BSC	2017–18	Bundesliga	31	0	2	0	1	0	34	0
Hertha BSC	2018–19	Bundesliga	31	0	2	0	0	0	33	0
Hertha BSC	2019–20	Bundesliga	29	0	2	0	0	0	31	0
Hertha BSC	2020–21	Bundesliga	8	0	0	0	0	0	8	0
Hertha BSC	Total		164	0	13	0	2	0	179	0
Hertha BSC II	2015–16	Regionalliga Nordost	1	0	—		—		1	0
Career total			404	0	44	0	15	0	463	0

=== International ===
Appearances and goals by national team and year
National team	Year	Apps	Goals
Norway	2007	1	0
Norway	2008	4	0
Norway	2009	2	0
Norway	2010	2	0
Norway	2011	8	0
Norway	2012	9	0
Norway	2013	10	0
Norway	2014	2	0
Norway	2015	0	0
Norway	2016	6	0
Norway	2017	6	0
Norway	2018	8	0
Norway	2019	7	0
Norway	2020	4	0
Norway	2021	3	0
Total		72	0

== Honours ==
Rosenborg

- Tippeligaen: 2009
- Superfinalen: 2010

Individual

- Gullballen: 2018
