= Per Ciljan Skjelbred =

Norwegian footballer (born 1987)

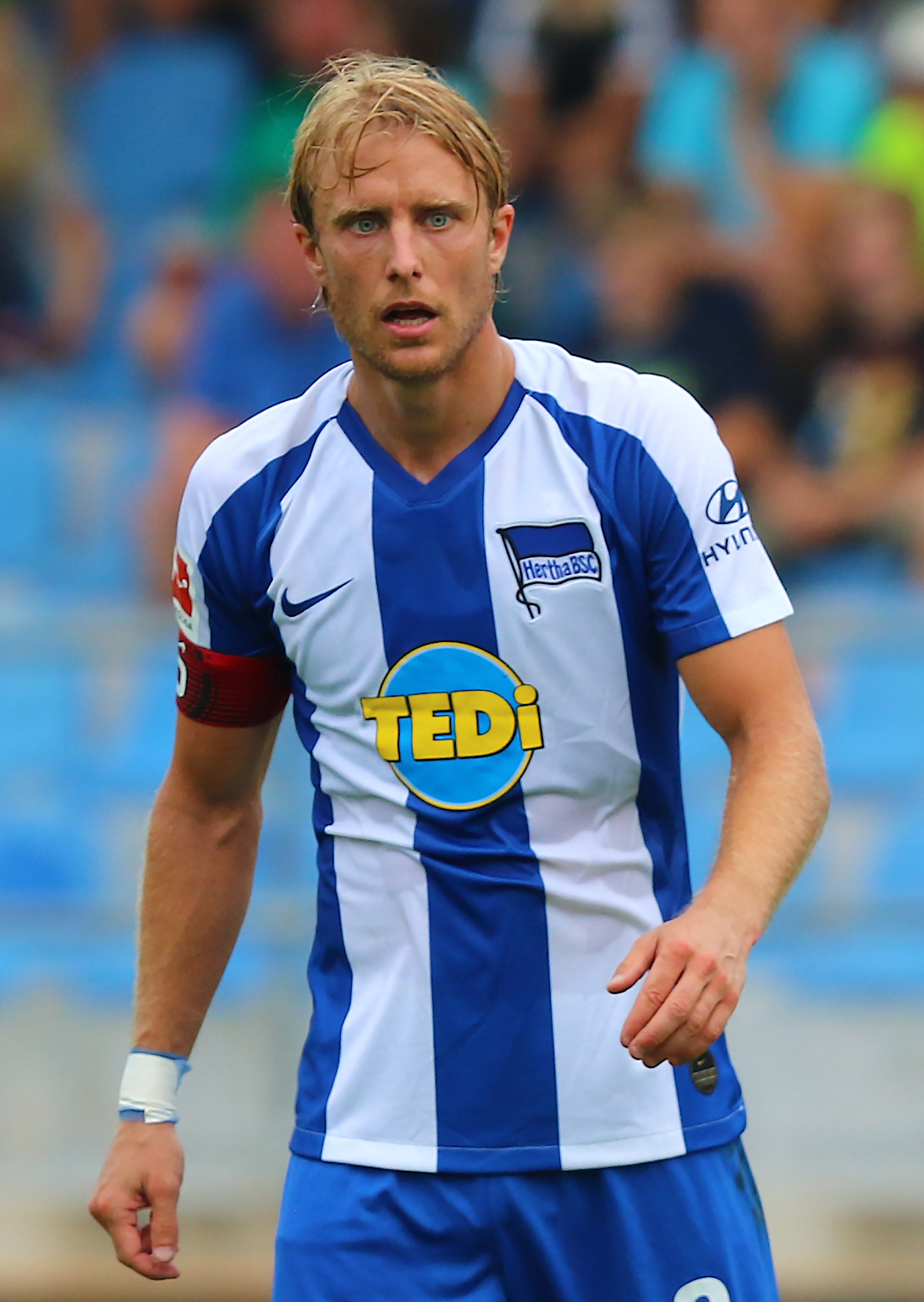
- Skjelbred playing for Hertha BSC in 2019

Personal information
- Full name: Per Ciljan Skjelbred
- Date of birth: 16 June 1987 (age 39)
- Place of birth: Trondheim, Norway
- Height: 1.76 m (5 ft 9 in)
- Position: Midfielder

Youth career
- Trygg/Lade

Senior career*
Years	Team	Apps	(Gls)
2004–2011	Rosenborg	156	(9)
2011–2014	Hamburger SV	26	(0)
2013–2014	→ Hertha BSC (loan)	28	(2)
2014–2020	Hertha BSC	151	(0)
2020–2023	Rosenborg	68	(2)
2024–2025	Ranheim	46	(1)

International career^{‡}
2003	Norway U16	9	(0)
2004	Norway U17	12	(0)
2005	Norway U18	4	(0)
2005	Norway U19	12	(1)
2005–2008	Norway U21	12	(1)
2007–2016	Norway	43	(1)
- * Club domestic league appearances and goals as of 8 November 2025 ‡ National team caps and goals as of 23 February 2017

Per Ciljan Skjelbred (born 16 June 1987) is a former Norwegian footballer who played as a midfielder. He has previously played for Hertha Berlin and Hamburger SV, and has been capped 43 times playing for Norway, but as of 2017, retired from international football.

== Club career ==
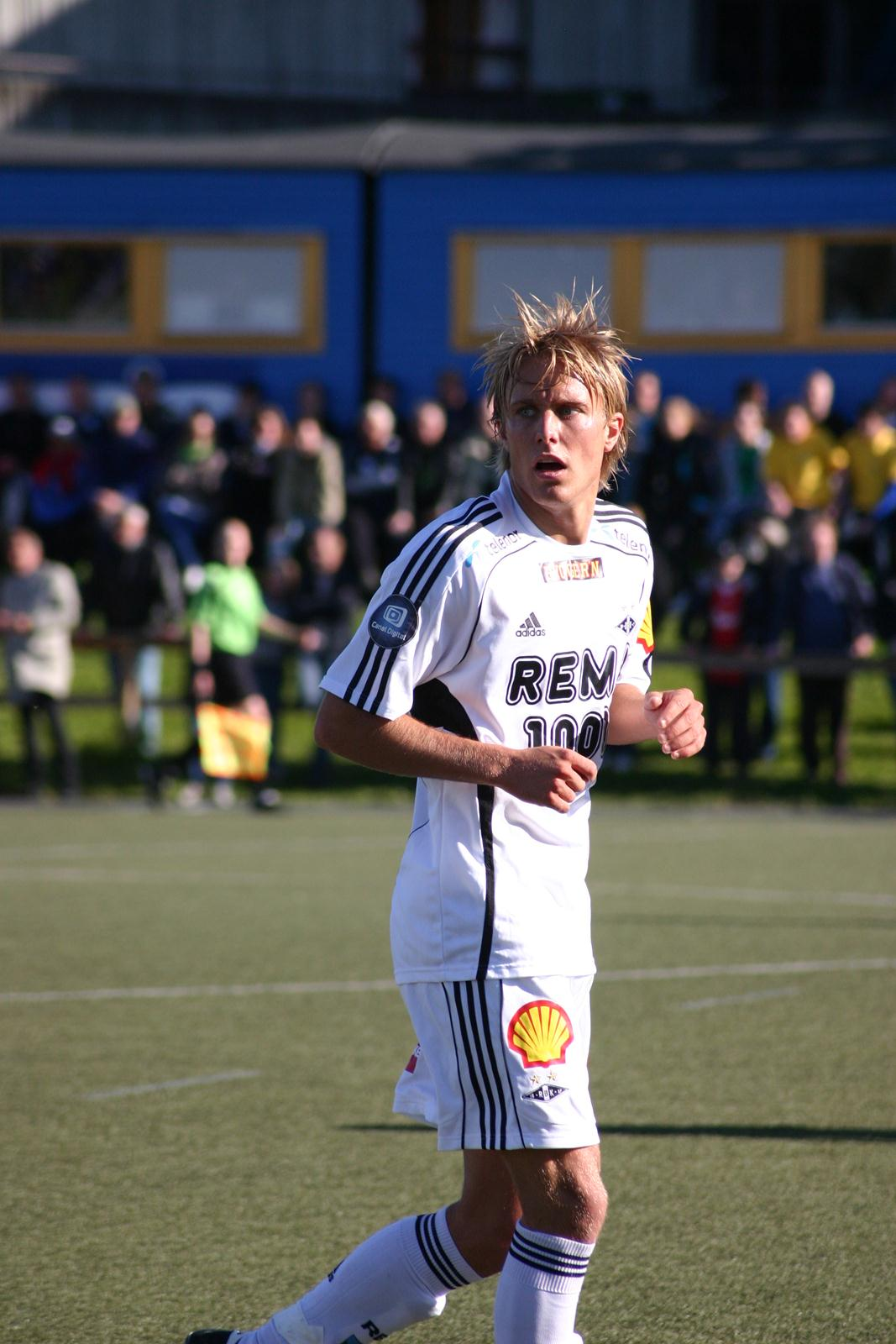
Skjelbred with Rosenborg in 2009

Skjelbred was born in Trondheim and started his career at local football club Trygg/Lade. He made an impression, and was selected to compete in a football talent competition entitled Proffdrømmen ("Pro player dreams") on Norwegian TV3. Skjelbred won this competition and as first prize, he got a week's training with Liverpool. The English club offered him a contract for their youth team, but he declined.

Instead, he went to hometown club Rosenborg, where he soon came into first-team reckoning. Skjelbred made his senior debut in the Tippeligaen against Bodø/Glimt in 2004, and aged 16 years and 358 days became the second-youngest player to play for Rosenborg.

After scoring a goal in the first match of the 2005 Champions League against Olympiacos, he was tackled in the return match at Lerkendal on 23 November by Ieroklis Stoltidis; both bones in Skjelbred's lower leg snapped just above the ankle. Although he went in with both legs and had no chance of getting the ball, Stoltidis said he had not meant to harm Skjelbred. Skjelbred returned to football on 10 March 2006 in Rosenborg BK's match against Aalesunds FK, playing the first half of the match which Rosenborg won 5–1.

Skjelbred joined the German side Hamburger SV in August 2011. After playing 268 minutes for the club in the Bundesliga, Skjelbred's transfer was called a "mistake" (Bisher Fehlgriff) by Kicker in November 2011, and in November 2012 Skjelbred was named one of five players that HSV stated they would sell when the transfer window opened in January 2013.

However, after the 2013 January transfer window closed, Skjelbred remained a Hamburg player. In the summer of 2013, he was loaned for one season to Hertha BSC, who in turn loaned Pierre-Michel Lasogga to Hamburg.

After a very successful loan spell at Hertha (he was also voted Bundesliga Norwegian Player of the Season during this time), Skjelbred finally moved to Berlin permanently during the 2014 Summer transfer window.

In February 2020, Skjelbred confirmed he would return to Rosenborg beginning from the summer 2020 after his contract with Hertha Berlin expires.

Ahead of the 2024 season, Skjelbred signed for Ranheim. Originally a one-year contract with the club, Skjelbred signed a one-year extension in September 2024.

== International career ==
Skjelbred's debut at the international stage came in 2003 with Norways U16 team. He subsequently made appearances for the U17, U18, and U19 teams as well. Skjelbred was first called up for the Norwegian under-21 team in September 2005, at the age of 18. He made his debut for senior team against Malta on 28 March 2007.

On 3 September 2014 Skjelbred captained the Norwegian national side for the first time against England at Wembley. England won the match 1-0 thanks to a Wayne Rooney penalty. Per was handed the captain's armband after previous captain, Brede Hangeland retired from international football.

On 22 February 2017 Skjelbred retired from the national team.

== Personal life ==
Skjelbred married Kristina Jørgensen in October 2012. Together they have two children Eline Sofie and Jonathan.

== Career statistics ==
=== Club ===
As of 8 November 2025

Club	Season	League			National cup		Europe		Total	
Club	Season	Division	Apps	Goals	Apps	Goals	Apps	Goals	Apps	Goals
Rosenborg	2004	Eliteserien	2	0	2	0	—		4	0
Rosenborg	2005	Eliteserien	13	3	3	1	5 (Note: Appearances in UEFA Champions League)	1	21	5
Rosenborg	2006	Eliteserien	20	0	5	2	—		25	2
Rosenborg	2007	Eliteserien	25	2	4	0	8	0	37	2
Rosenborg	2008	Eliteserien	25	1	2	1	12 (Note: Four appearances in UEFA Intertoto Cup, six appearances and three goals in UEFA Cup)	3	41	5
Rosenborg	2009	Eliteserien	27	1	4	0	4 (Note: Appearances in UEFA Europa League)	0	35	1
Rosenborg	2010	Eliteserien	29	1	5	2	11 (Note: Five appearances in UEFA Champions League, six appearances in UEFA Europa League)	0	45	3
Rosenborg	2011	Eliteserien	15	1	3	2	3	1	21	4
Rosenborg	Total		156	9	28	8	43	5	227	22
Hamburger SV	2011–12	Bundesliga	8	0	1	0	—		9	0
Hamburger SV	2012–13	Bundesliga	18	0	1	0	—		19	0
Hamburger SV	Total		26	0	2	0	—		28	0
Hertha BSC (loan)	2013–14	Bundesliga	28	2	0	0	—		28	2
Hertha BSC	2014–15	Bundesliga	26	0	0	0	—		26	0
Hertha BSC	2015–16	Bundesliga	31	0	5	0	—		36	0
Hertha BSC	2016–17	Bundesliga	26	0	3	0	2	0	31	0
Hertha BSC	2017–18	Bundesliga	28	0	2	0	3	0	33	0
Hertha BSC	2018–19	Bundesliga	16	0	1	0	—		17	0
Hertha BSC	2019–20	Bundesliga	24	0	1	0	—		25	0
Hertha BSC	Total		179	2	12	0	5	0	196	2
Rosenborg	2020	Eliteserien	15	1	—		3	0	18	1
Rosenborg	2021	Eliteserien	17	1	1	0	0	0	18	1
Rosenborg	2022	Eliteserien	19	0	1	0	—		20	0
Rosenborg	2023	Eliteserien	17	0	1	0	3 (Note: Appearances in UEFA Conference League)	0	21	0
Rosenborg	Total	Eliteserien	68	2	3	0	6	0	77	2
Ranheim	2024	1. divisjon	28	0	0	0	—		28	0
Ranheim	2025	1. divisjon	18	1	2	0	—		20	1
Ranheim	Total		46	1	2	0	—		48	1
Career Total			475	14	47	8	54	5	576	27

=== International ===
As of match played 11 November 2016

Appearances and goals by national team and year
National team	Year	Apps	Goals
Norway	2007	3	0
Norway	2008	4	0
Norway	2009	5	0
Norway	2010	4	0
Norway	2011	0	0
Norway	2012	0	0
Norway	2013	6	1
Norway	2014	7	0
Norway	2015	9	0
Norway	2016	5	0
Total		43	1

Norway score listed first, score column indicates score after each Skjelbred goal.

No	Date	Venue	Opponent	Score	Result	Competition
1.	11 June 2013	Ullevaal Stadion, Oslo, Norway	North Macedonia	1–0	2–0	Friendly

== Honours ==
Rosenborg

- Tippeligaen: 2006, 2009, 2010
- Superfinalen: 2010
- UEFA Intertoto Cup: 2008 (Note: Rosenborg was one of 11 teams to advance to the 2008–09 UEFA Cup by winning all their stages of the 2008 UEFA Intertoto Cup. Brage advanced the furthest in the UEFA Cup and was declared the overall winner.)
