= Florian Baak =

German footballer

Personal information
- Date of birth: 18 March 1999 (age 27)
- Place of birth: Berlin, Germany
- Height: 1.85 m (6 ft 1 in)
- Position: Defender

Youth career
- –2005: Reinickendorfer Füchse
- 2005–2017: Hertha BSC

Senior career*
Years	Team	Apps	(Gls)
2016–2020	Hertha BSC II	53	(5)
2017–2020	Hertha BSC	3	(0)
2020–2022	Winterthur	37	(1)
2022	Honka II	2	(1)
2022–2023	Honka	19	(0)

International career
2013–2014	Germany U15	4	(1)
2014–2015	Germany U16	6	(0)
2015–2016	Germany U17	11	(1)
- * Club domestic league appearances and goals as of 21 October 2023

Florian Baak (German pronunciation: [ˈfloːʁi̯aːn ˈbaːk]; born 18 March 1999) is a German professional footballer who most recently played as a defender in Finland for Honka.

== Club career ==
On 12 October 2020, Baak signed a two-year contract with the Swiss club FC Winterthur.
