= Guido Winkmann =

German football referee (born 1973)

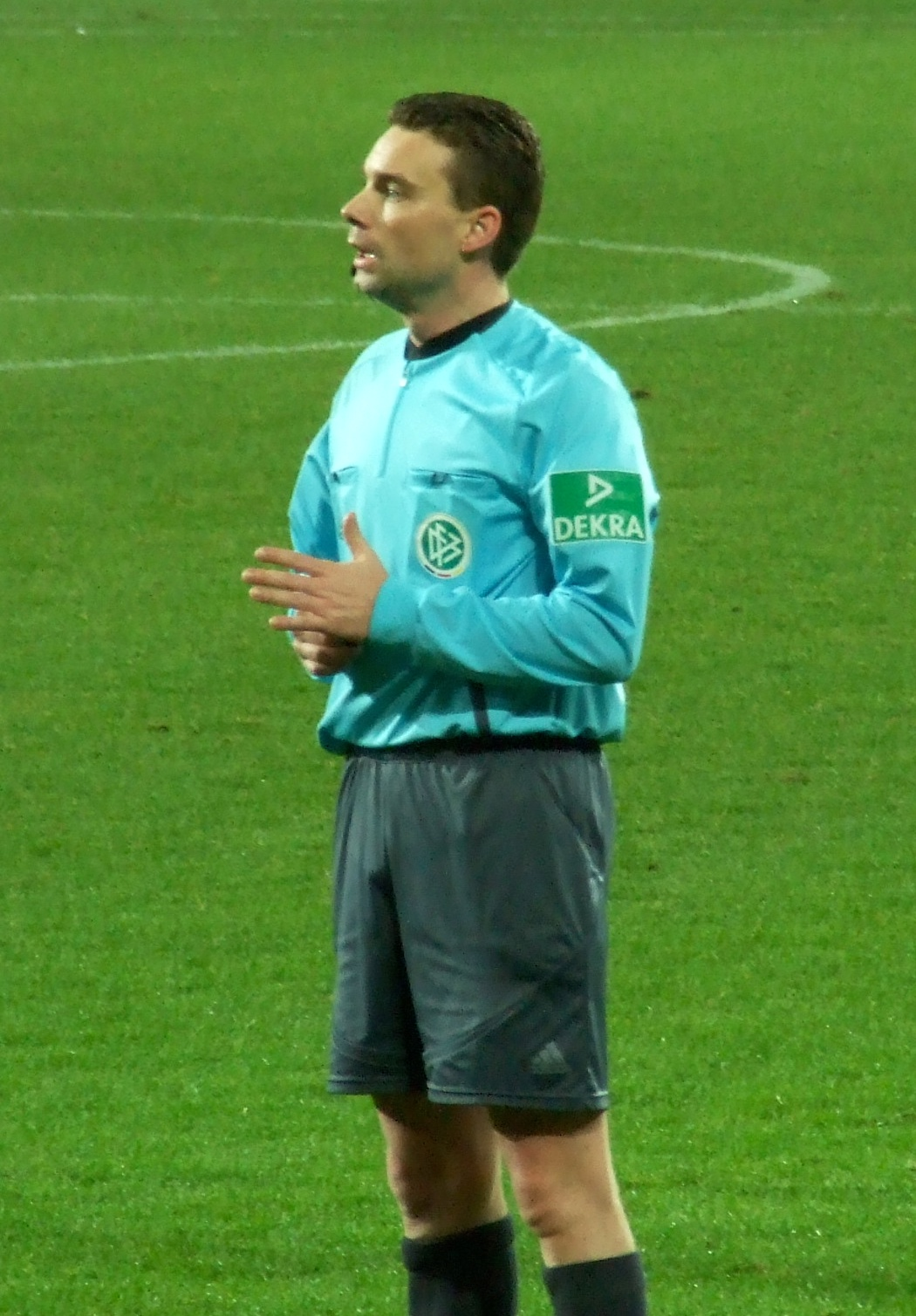
- Winkmann in 2010
- Born: 27 November 1973 (age 52)
- Other occupation: Police officer

Domestic
Years	League	Role
2001–2021	DFB	Referee
2004–2021	2. Bundesliga	Referee
2008–2021	Bundesliga	Referee

Guido Winkmann (born 27 November 1973) is a German football referee who is based in Kerken. He referees for SV Nütterden of the Lower Rhine Football Association.

== Career ==
Winkmann started his refereeing career in 2001, and in 2004 he was promoted to the 2. Bundeliga. In 2011, he was promoted to the elite group of referees who referee the Bundesliga. His first match was on 16 August 2008 when he refereed Energie Cottbus and TSG 1899 Hoffenheim.

In 2018, he refereed a Bundesliga match between SC Freiburg and FSV Mainz in which he awarded a penalty after half the players had left the pitch for halftime.
