= 2009–10 FC St. Pauli season =

FC St. Pauli
2009–10 season
- Chairman: Corny Littmann
- Manager: Holger Stanislawski
- 2. Bundesliga: 2nd (promoted)
- DFB-Pokal: Second round
- Top goalscorer: League: Ebbers (20); All: Ebbers (20)
- Highest home attendance: 23,254 (vs Fortuna Düsseldorf)
Home colours	Away colours	Third colours

For the 2009–10 season, Fußball-Club St. Pauli competed in the 2. Bundesliga.

== Transfers ==
=== Summer Transfers ===
In: Note: Flags indicate national team as defined under FIFA eligibility rules; some limited exceptions apply. Players may hold more than one non-FIFA nationality.

No.	Pos.	Nation	Player
5	MF	CAN	Jonathan Beaulieu-Bourgault (loan return from Wilhelmshaven)
7	MF	GER	Rouwen Hennings (from Hamburg, previously on loan)
13	MF	GER	Charles Takyi (from Greuther Fürth)
16	MF	GER	Markus Thorandt (from 1860 Munich)
18	MF	GER	Max Kruse (from Werder Bremen II)
20	MF	GER	Matthias Lehmann (from Alemannia Aachen)
23	FW	GER	Deniz Naki (from Bayer Leverkusen II, previously on loan at Rot-Weiss Ahlen)
32	DF	GHA	Davidson Drobo-Ampem (from St. Pauli II)
33	DF	GER	Mathias Hinzmann (from FC St. Pauli II)

Out: Note: Flags indicate national team as defined under FIFA eligibility rules; some limited exceptions apply. Players may hold more than one non-FIFA nationality.

No.	Pos.	Nation	Player
5	MF	GER	Björn Brunnemann (to Union Berlin)
6	MF	CZE	Filip Trojan (to Mainz)
9	FW	GER	René Schnitzler (to FC Wegberg-Beeck)
13	DF	GER	Benjamin Weigelt (to Wehen Wiesbaden)
18	FW	GER	Alexander Ludwig (to 1860 Munich)
23	MF	CAN	David Hoilett (loan return to Blackburn Rovers)
28	FW	TUR	Ömer Şişmanoğlu (to Kayserispor)

=== Winter Transfers ===
In: Note: Flags indicate national team as defined under FIFA eligibility rules; some limited exceptions apply. Players may hold more than one non-FIFA nationality.

No.	Pos.	Nation	Player
3	MF	GER	Bastian Oczipka (on loan from Bayer 04 Leverkusen, previously on loan at F.C. Hansa Rostock)
19	FW	GER	Richard Sukuta-Pasu (on loan from Bayer 04 Leverkusen.)

== Players ==
=== Appearances and goals ===
Appearance and goalscoring records for all the players who are in the St. Pauli first team squad during the 2009–10 season.

No.	Pos	Nat	Player	Total		2. Bundesliga		DFB-Pokal	
No.	Pos	Nat	Player	Apps	Goals	Apps	Goals	Apps	Goals
1	GK	(Germany) GER	Patrik Borger	0	0	0	0	0	0
2	DF	(Germany) GER	Florian Lechner	14	0	14	0	0	0
3	MF	(Germany) GER	Bastian Oczipka	16	0	16	0	0	0
4	DF	(Germany) GER	Fabio Morena	33	0	31	0	2	0
5	MF	(Canada) CAN	Jonathan Beaulieu-Bourgault	3	0	3	0	0	0
6	DF	(Cameroon) CMR	Marc Gouiffe à Goufan	0	0	0	0	0	0
7	FW	(Germany) GER	Rouwen Hennings	31	9	29	9	2	0
8	MF	(Germany) GER	Florian Bruns	35	6	33	6	2	0
9	FW	(Germany) GER	Marius Ebbers	35	20	34	20	1	0
10	MF	(Germany) GER	Thomas Meggle	0	0	0	0	0	0
11	DF	(Germany) GER	Ralph Gunesch	22	0	21	0	1	0
12	MF	(Germany) GER	Timo Schultz	15	0	14	0	1	0
13	MF	(Germany) GER	Charles Takyi	31	9	29	8	2	1
14	DF	(Germany) GER	Marcel Eger	3	0	3	0	0	0
16	DF	(Germany) GER	Markus Thorandt	16	0	15	0	1	0
17	MF	(Germany) GER	Fabian Boll	28	1	26	1	2	0
18	MF	(Germany) GER	Max Kruse	31	7	29	7	2	0
19	FW	(Germany) GER	Richard Sukuta-Pasu	13	1	13	1	0	0
20	MF	(Germany) GER	Matthias Lehmann	35	8	33	8	2	0
22	DF	(Germany) GER	Andreas Biermann	1	0	1	0	0	0
23	FW	(Germany) GER	Deniz Naki	32	9	30	7	2	2
24	DF	(Germany) GER	Carsten Rothenbach	30	1	28	1	2	0
25	GK	(Germany) GER	Mathias Hain	35	0	33	0	2	0
26	FW	(France) FRA	Morike Sako	14	1	14	1	0	0
27	DF	(Germany) GER	Jan-Philipp Kalla	9	1	8	1	1	0
29	FW	(Germany) GER	Nils Pichinot	2	1	1	1	1	0
30	MF	(Germany) GER	Dennis Daube	9	0	9	0	0	0
31	GK	(Germany) GER	Benedikt Pliquett	2	0	2	0	0	0
32	DF	(Germany) GER	Davidson Drobo-Ampem	4	0	3	0	1	0
33	DF	(Germany) GER	Mathias Hinzmann	0	0	0	0	0	0

== 2. Bundesliga ==
=== Results ===
Win Draw Loss

Note: Results are given with St. Pauli score listed first.

Game	Date	Venue	Opponent	Result F–A	Attendance	St Pauli Goalscorers
1	7 August 2009	H	R-W Ahlen	2–1	22,294	Lehmann 31', Pichinot 90'
2	17 August 2009	A	Alemannia Aachen	5–0	16,201	Ebbers (2) 24', 28', Naki 35', Bruns (pen.) 39', Hennings 86'
3	22 August 2009	H	MSV Duisburg	2–2	22,554	Bruns (pen.)13', Takyi 27'
4	28 August 2009	A	Karlsruher SC	4–0	26,300	Lehmann(2) 25', 54', Hennings 69', Ebbers 74'
5	13 September 2009	A	FSV Frankfurt	3–2	8,577	Ebbers 1', Takyi 69', Lehmann 75'
6	20 September 2009	H	1. FC Kaiserslautern	1–2	23,201	Bruns (pen.) 84'
7	26 September 2009	A	Arminia Bielefeld	0–1	23,800
8	4 October 2009	H	TSV 1860 Munich	3–1	23,188	Rothenbach 28', Ebbers 58', Naki 90'
9	16 October 2009	A	Rot-Weiß Oberhausen	3–1	10,124	Ebbers 60', Bruns 73', Kruse 90'
10	25 October 2009	H	Energie Cottbus	1–1	22,254	Kruse 67'
11	2 November 2009	A	Hansa Rostock	2–0	21,500	Lehmann 76', Naki 84'
12	6 November 2009	H	Fortuna Düsseldorf	2–1	23,254	Kruse 4', Hennings 72'
13	22 November 2009	A	FC Augsburg	2–3	22,272	Ebbers (2) 29', 73'
14	29 November 2009	H	Union Berlin	3–0	19,800	Ebbers 8', Kalla 15', Kruse 39'
15	5 December 2009	A	Koblenz	5–1	9,760	Ebbers 10', Kruse (2) 27', 55', Bruns (pen.) 73', Hennings 79'
16	13 December 2009	H	Greuther Fürth	2–2	19,417	Takyi 41', Hennings 66'
17	20 December 2009	A	Paderborn	1–2	13,500	Sako 90'
18	16 January 2010	A	R-W Ahlen	2–0	6,322	Ebbers 77', Sukuta-Pasu 87'
19	23 January 2010	H	Alemannia Aachen	1–0	19,600	Kruse 30'
20	29 January 2010	A	MSV Duisburg	2–0	16,446	Ebbers 6', Naki 21'
21	5 February 2010	H	Karlsruher SC	2–1	19,763	Hennings (2) 24', 44'
22	12 February 2010	H	FSV Frankfurt	0–0	19,600
23	22 February 2010	A	1. FC Kaiserslautern	0–3	43,687
24	28 February 2010	H	Arminia Bielefeld	0–1	19,901
25	7 March 2010	A	TSV 1860 Munich	1–2	27,700	Ebbers 51'
26	14 March 2010	H	Rot-Weiß Oberhausen	5–3	19,901	Ebbers 5', Lehmann 23', Oczipka 53', Bruns 73', Boll 84'
27	19 March 2010	A	Energie Cottbus	1–0	12,930	Takyi 53'
28	28 March 2010	H	Hansa Rostock	2–0	19,146	Ebbers 41', Naki 55'
29	5 April 2010	A	Fortuna Düsseldorf	0–1	47,200
30	12 April 2010	H	FC Augsburg	3–0	23,201	Lehmann 51', Ebbers (2) 63', 83'
31	17 April 2010	A	Union Berlin	1–2	19,000	Takyi 19'
32	23 April 2010	H	Koblenz	6–1	19,686	Takyi (2) 42', 57', Naki 43', Ebbers 59', Hennings 69', Lehmann (pen.)73'
33	2 May 2010	A	Greuther Fürth	4–1	15,200	Naki 51', Ebbers 65', Takyi 73', Hennings 88'
34	9 May 2010	H	Paderborn	1–2	19,901	Ebbers 19'

== DFB-Pokal ==
=== Results ===
Win Draw Loss

Note: Results are given with FC St Pauli score listed first.

Round	Date	Venue	Opponent	Result F–A	Attendance	St Pauli Goalscorers
1	2 August 2009	A	Villingen	2–0 (AET)	8,300	Naki (2) 105', 120'
2	24 September 2009	A	Werder Bremen	1–2	31,824	Takyi 75'
