= 2013–14 1. FC Köln season =

1. FC Köln
2013–14 season
- Sporting Director: Jörg Jakobs
- Manager: Peter Stöger
- Stadium: RheinEnergieStadion, Cologne, NRW
- 2. Bundesliga: 1st (promoted)
- DFB-Pokal: Round of 16
Home colours

The 2013–14 1. FC Köln season was the 65th season in club history.

== Background ==
Peter Stöger was appointed the new head coach of 1. FC Köln on 11 June.

=== Transfers ===
==== In ====
No.	Pos.	Name	Age	EU	Moving from	Type	Transfer Window	Contract ends	Transfer fee	Ref.
	MF	Maximilian Thiel	20	Yes	Wacker Burghausen	Transfer	Summer	2016	Undisclosed	
	MF	Marcel Risse	23	Yes	Mainz 05	Transfer	Summer	2016	Undisclosed	
	DF	Román Golobart	21	Yes	Wigan Athletic	End of contract	Summer	2016	Free	

==== Out ====
No.	Pos.	Name	Age	EU	Moving to	Type	Transfer Window	Transfer fee	Ref.
20	MF	Reinhold Yabo	21	Yes	Karlsruher SC	Transfer	Summer	Free	
	MF	Christian Clemens	21	Yes	Schalke 04	Transfer	Summer	€2.8 Million	

== 2. Bundesliga ==
=== 2. Bundesliga review ===
==== Matchdays 1 – 17 ====
Köln 2013–14 started on 20 July against Dynamo Dresden. The match ended in a 1–1 draw. Anthony Ujah scored for Köln and Tobias Kempe scored for Dynamo Dresden. Köln ended the matchday tied for eighth in the league table with Dynamo Dresden. Then Köln ended July with matchday two against Fortuna Düsseldorf on 28 July. The match ended in a 1–1 draw. Anthony Ujah scored for Köln and Charlison Benschop scored for Fortuna Düsseldorf. Köln finished July tied with Dynamo Dresden for tenth place in the table. Köln started August with matchday three Paderborn 07 on 10 August. The match ended in a 1–1 draw. Kacper Przybylko scored for Köln and Markus Krösche scored for Paderborn. Köln finished the matchday in 13th place. Köln faced SV Sandhausen on matchday four on 17 August. Köln won 2–0 with two goals from Marcel Risse. Köln finished the matchday tied for seventh with FSV Frankfurt in the table. Köln finished August with matchday five against Greuther Fürth on 24 August. The match ended in a 0–0. Köln finished August in 10th place. Köln started September with a matchday six against Erzgebirge Aue on 1 September. Köln won the match 4–1. Yannick Gerhardt, Marcel Risse, and Sławomir Peszko scored for Köln. Marcel Risse scored two goals. Taku Ishihara scored for Erzgebirge Aue. Köln finished the matchday in third place. Köln faced Energie Cottbus on matchday seven on 16 September. Köln won 4–0. Patrick Helmes, Anthony Ujah, and Sławomir Peszko scored for Köln. Anthony Ujah scored two goals. Köln finished the matchday in third place. Köln faced 1. FC Kaiserslautern on matchday eight on 20 September. The match ended in a 0–0 draw. Köln finished the matchday in second place. Köln finished September with matchday nine against VfR Aalen on 27 September. Köln won 1–0 with a goal from Marcel Risse. Köln finished September in second place. Köln started October with matchday 10 against Karlsruher SC on 5 October. Köln won 2–1. Patrick Helmes and Mišo Brečko scored for Köln. Koen van der Biezen scored for Karlsruhe. Köln finished the matchday in first place. Köln faced 1860 München on matchday 11 on 21 October. The match ended in a 0–0 draw. Köln finished the matchday in first place. Köln finished October with matchday 12 against Arminia Bielefeld on 25 October. Köln won 1–0 with a goal from Sławomir Peszko. Köln finished the matchday in first place. Köln started November with matchday 13 against Union Berlin on 4 November. Köln won 4–0 with goals from Marcel Risse, Yannick Gerhardt, and Jonas Hector. Marcel Risse scored two goals. Köln finished the matchday in first place. Köln faced VfL Bochum on matchday 14 on 10 November. Bochum won 1–0 with a goal from Richard Sukuta-Pasu. Köln finished the matchday in first place. Köln faced Ingolstadt 04 on matchday 15 on 23 November. Ingolstadt won 1–0 with a goal from Moritz Hartmann. Köln finished the matchday in second place. Köln finished November with matchday 16 against FC St. Pauli on 29 November. Köln won 3–0 with goals from Kevin Wimmer, Patrick Helmes, and Yannick Gerhardt. Köln finished the matchday in first place. Köln started December with matchday 17 against FSV Frankfurt on 7 December. Köln won 2–0 with goals from Anthony Ujah and Marcel Risse. Köln finished the matchday and the first–half of the season in first place.

=== League fixtures and results ===
Win Draw Loss Postponed

MD	Date^{1}	Venue	Opponent	Res. F–A	Att.	Goalscorers and disciplined players		Pos.	Ref.
MD	Date^{1}	Venue	Opponent	Res. F–A	Att.	1. FC Köln	Opponent	Pos.	Ref.
1	20 July – 15:30	A	Dynamo Dresden	1–1	29,308	Golobart (yellow card) 26'; Ujah 62'; Maroh (yellow card) 89'	Menz (yellow card) 43'; Kempe 79'; Poté (yellow card) 90'	T8	
2	28 July – 15:30	H	Fortuna Düsseldorf	1–1	50,000	Jajalo (yellow card) 32'; Ujah 67'; Golobart (yellow card) 85'	Benschop 12'; Bolly (yellow card) 43'; Bodzek (yellow card) 87'	T10	
3	10 August – 13:00	A	Paderborn 07	1–1	12,397	Hector (yellow card) 51'; Ujah (yellow card) 90'; Przybylko 90+3'	Krösche 15' (yellow card) 62'	13	
4	17 August – 13:00	H	SV Sandhausen	2–0	39,000	Risse 55', 78' (pen.)	—	T7	
5	24 August – 13:00	A	Greuther Fürth	0–0	13,770	—	—	10	
6	1 September – 13:30	H	Erzgebirge Aue	4–1	42,000	Gerhardt 2'; Risse 11', 24'; Peszko 55'	Ishihara 14'	3	
7	16 September – 20:15	A	Energie Cottbus	4–0	10,406	Helmes 2'; Ujah 8', 28'; Peszko 67'	—	3	
8	20 September – 18:30	H	1. FC K'lautern	0–0	50,000	—	—	2	
9	27 September – 18:40	A	VfR Aalen	1–0	8,718	Risse 32'	—	2	
10	5 October – 13:00	A	Karlsruher SC	2–1	20,000	Helmes 59'; Brečko 90'	Varnhagen (yellow card) 30' van der Biezen (yellow card) 43' (goal) 52'; Krebs (yellow card) 43'	1	
11	21 October – 20:15	H	1860 München	0–0	48,300	—	Stark (yellow card) 6'; Vallori (yellow card) 40'; Stoppelkamp (yellow card) 78'	1	
12	25 October – 18:30	A	Arminia Bielefeld	1–0	26,200	Brečko (yellow card) 34'; Peszko 80'; Helmes (yellow card) 85'; Thiel (yellow card) 86'	Riese (yellow card) 17'; Hornig (yellow card) 63'	1	
13	4 November – 20:15	H	Union Berlin	4–0	45,000	Risse 22', 30'; Brečko (yellow card) 29'; Peszko (yellow card) 30'; Gerhardt 52'; Hector 66'	Kreilach (yellow card) 37'; Pfertzel (yellow card) 51'	1	
14	10 November – 13:30	A	VfL Bochum	0–1	27,555	Gologart (yellow card) 90'	Sukuta-Pasu 65'; Maltritz (yellow card) 89'	1	
15	23 November – 13:00	H	Ingolstadt 04	0–1	47,000	Lehmann (yellow card) 69'	Hartmann 48'; Morales (yellow card) 62'	2	
16	29 November – 18:30	A	FC St. Pauli	3–0	29,063	Wimmer 6'; Helmes 28'; Lehmann (yellow card) 68'; Gerhardt 79'; Peszko (yellow card) 84'	Schachten (yellow card) 36'; Gonther (yellow card) 39' (red card) 59'; Kalla (yellow card) 77'	1	
17	7 December – 13:00	H	FSV Frankfurt	2–0	43,300	Ujah 54'; Risse 84'	Kandziora (yellow card) 82'	1	
18	13 December – 18:30	H	Dynamo Dresden	3–1	45,000	Helmes 14', 25'; Brečko 52'	Aoudia 56'	1	
19	22 December – 14:30	A	Fortuna Düsseldorf	3–2	52,500	Hector (yellow card) 25'; Ujah 29', 75'; Lehmann (yellow card) 33'; Helmes 38'; Wimmer (yellow card) 80'	Hoffer 55'; Benschop 62'; Giefer (yellow card) 80'; Weber (yellow card) 86'; Levels (yellow card) 88'; Taşkin (yellow card) 89'	1	
20	9 February – 13:30	H	Paderborn 07	0–1	48,100	Lehmann (yellow card) 72'; Peszko (yellow card) 90'	Vrančić (yellow card) 40'; Meha 47'	1	
21	16 February – 13:30	A	SV Sandhausen	1–0	9,800	Helmes 48'	Linsmayer (yellow card) 56'	1	
22	24 February – 20:15	H	Greuther Fürth	1–1	45,500	Wimmer 36'; Ujah (yellow card) 68'; Brečko (yellow card) 85'	Azemi 86'	1	
23	1 March – 13:00	A	Erzgebirge Aue	2–2	13,050	Maroh (yellow card) 69'; Halfar 83', 88'; Helmes (yellow card) 85'	Sylvestr 13'; Löning 69' (pen.)	1	
24	7 March – 20:30	H	Energie Cottbus	2–1	42,400	Halfar (yellow card) 78'; Hector 84'; Möhrle 86' (o.g.)	Stiven Rivić (yellow card) 31'; Sanogo 68'; Stiepermann (yellow card) 90'	1	
25	17 March – 20:15	A	1. FC Kaiserslautern	0–0	41,315	Wimmer (yellow card) 51'; Ujah (yellow card) 65'	Torrejón (yellow card) 64'; Ring (yellow card) 90'	1	
26	22 March – 13:00	H	VfR Aalen	0–0	45,700	Exslager (yellow card) 86'	Daghfous (yellow card) 21'; Fejzić (yellow card) 74'	1	
27	26 March – 17:30	H	Karlsruher SC	2–0	46,700	Brečko 29'; Helmes 58'	—	1	
28	30 March – 13:30	A	1860 München	1–0	33,600	Brečko (yellow card) 67'; Finne 85'	—	1	
29	5 April – 13:00	H	Arminia Bielefeld	2–0	48,900	Halfar 12'; Nagasawa (yellow card) 37'; Ujah 75'	Müller (yellow card) 16'; Schönfeld (yellow card) 85'	1	
30	11 April – 18:30	A	Union Berlin	2–1	21,000	Helmes 25' (pen.) 59'; Peszko (yellow card) 59'	Dausch 10'; Mattuschka (yellow card) 63'; Brandy (yellow card) 70'	1	
31	21 April – 20:15	H	VfL Bochum	3–1	49,100	Risse 50'; Helmes (penalty missed) 63' 64'; Ujah 81'	Matuszczyk 42' (o.g.); Acquistapace (red card) 62'; Jungwirth (yellow card) 65'	1	
32	25 April – 18:30	A	Ingolstadt 04	1–1	11,120	Maroh (yellow card) 14'; Brečko (yellow card) 61' (red card) 77'; Ujah 61'	Hartmann 34'; Morales (yellow card) 74'; Hofmann (penalty missed) 78'	1	
33	4 May – 13:30	H	FC St. Pauli	4–0	50,000	Ujah 13'; Kalla 39' (o.g.); Helmes 43'; Bigalke 61'; Nagasawa (yellow card) 67'; McKenna (penalty missed) 70'	—	1	
34	11 May – 13:30	A	FSV Frankfurt	0–2	12,542	—	Kapllani 65'; Leckie 71'; Teixeira (yellow card) 76'	1	

=== League table ===
Pos	Team	Pld	W	D	L	GF	GA	GD	Pts	Promotion, qualification or relegation
1	1. FC Köln (C, P)	34	19	11	4	53	20	+33	68	Promotion to Bundesliga
2	SC Paderborn (P)	34	18	8	8	63	48	+15	62	Promotion to Bundesliga
3	Greuther Fürth	34	17	9	8	64	38	+26	60	Qualification for promotion play-offs
4	1. FC Kaiserslautern	34	15	9	10	55	39	+16	54	
5	Karlsruher SC	34	12	14	8	47	34	+13	50	

Source: kicker.de
Rules for classification: 1) points; 2) goal difference; 3) number of goals scored.
(C) Champions; (P) Promoted

=== Results summary ===
Overall								Home						Away					
Pld	W	D	L	GF	GA	GD	Pts	W	D	L	GF	GA	GD	W	D	L	GF	GA	GD
24	13	8	3	38	15	+23	47	6	4	2	19	7	+12	7	4	1	19	8	+11

Last updated: 7 March 2014.
Source: kicker

== DFB–Pokal ==
=== DFB–Pokal review ===
The draw for the first round of the DFB-Pokal happened on 15 June. Köln were drawn against Eintracht Trier. The match happened on 3 August. Köln won 2–0 with goals from Marcel Risse and Maxi Thiel. Then Köln were drawn against Mainz 05 on 10 August The match took place on 24 September. Köln won 1–0 with a goal from Marcel Risse. Köln were drawn againsat Hamburger SV in the draw for the third round. The match took place on 3 December. Hamburg won 2–1 and knocked Köln out of the cup. Adam Matuszczyk scored for Köln. Maximilian Beister and Ivo Iličević scored for Hamburg.

=== DFB–Pokal results ===
==== Legend ====
Win Draw Loss Postponed

==== DFB–Pokal results ====
Round	Date^{1}	Venue	Opponent	Result^{2}	Attendance	Goalscorers and disciplined players		Source
Round	Date^{1}	Venue	Opponent	Result^{2}	Attendance	1. FC Köln	Opponent	Source
R1	3 August – 20:30	A	Eintracht Trier	2–0	10,494	Risse 48' (pen.); Thiel 87'	—	
R2	24 September – 20:30	A	Mainz 05	1–0	22,782	Risse 53'	–	
R16	3 December – 19:00	A	Hamburger SV	1–2	57,000	Matuszczyk 54'	Beister 42'; Iličević 85'	
