= 2014–15 1. FC Köln season =

1. FC Köln
2014–15 season
- President: Reinhard Rauball
- Manager: Peter Stöger
- Stadium: RheinEnergieStadion
- Bundesliga: 12th
- DFB-Pokal: Round 3
Home colours	Away colours	Third colours

The 2014–15 1. FC Köln season was the 66th season in club history.

== Players ==
=== Current squad ===
As of 6 July 2014

For recent transfers, see List of German football transfers summer 2014.

Note: Flags indicate national team as defined under FIFA eligibility rules; some limited exceptions apply. Players may hold more than one non-FIFA nationality.

No.	Pos.	Nation	Player
1	GK	GER	Timo Horn
2	DF	SLO	Mišo Brečko (captain)
4	DF	ESP	Román Golobart
5	DF	SLO	Dominic Maroh
6	MF	GER	Kevin Vogt
7	MF	GER	Marcel Risse
8	MF	POL	Adam Matuszczyk
9	FW	NGR	Anthony Ujah
10	FW	GER	Patrick Helmes
11	FW	GER	Thomas Bröker
13	FW	JPN	Yūya Ōsako
14	DF	GER	Jonas Hector
16	DF	POL	Paweł Olkowski
17	MF	POL	Sławomir Peszko

No.	Pos.	Nation	Player
18	GK	GER	Thomas Kessler
19	DF	ALB	Mërgim Mavraj
22	MF	GER	Daniel Halfar
23	FW	GER	Simon Zoller
25	MF	JPN	Kazuki Nagasawa
26	FW	NOR	Bård Finne
28	DF	AUT	Kevin Wimmer
29	MF	SVK	Dušan Švento
31	MF	GER	Yannick Gerhardt
32	MF	GER	Lucas Cueto
33	MF	GER	Matthias Lehmann
34	GK	GER	Marcel Schuhen
37	GK	GER	Daniel Mesenhöler
39	MF	GER	Andre Wallenborn

== Competitions ==
=== Bundesliga ===
==== League table ====
Pos	Team	Pld	W	D	L	GF	GA	GD	Pts	Qualification or relegation
1	Bayern Munich (C)	34	25	4	5	80	18	+62	79	Qualification for the Champions League group stage
2	VfL Wolfsburg	34	20	9	5	72	38	+34	69	Qualification for the Champions League group stage
3	Borussia Mönchengladbach	34	19	9	6	53	26	+27	66	Qualification for the Champions League group stage
4	Bayer Leverkusen	34	17	10	7	62	37	+25	61	Qualification for the Champions League play-off round
5	FC Augsburg	34	15	4	15	43	43	0	49	Qualification for the Europa League group stage (Note: Since the winners of the 2014–15 DFB-Pokal, VfL Wolfsburg, qualified for the Champions League based on league position, the Europa League group stage spot was passed to the sixth-placed team, Schalke 04; and the Europa League third qualifying round spot was passed to the seventh-placed team, Borussia Dortmund.)
6	Schalke 04	34	13	9	12	42	40	+2	48	Qualification for the Europa League group stage
7	Borussia Dortmund	34	13	7	14	47	42	+5	46	Qualification for the Europa League third qualifying round
8	1899 Hoffenheim	34	12	8	14	49	55	−6	44	
9	Eintracht Frankfurt	34	11	10	13	56	62	−6	43	
10	Werder Bremen	34	11	10	13	50	65	−15	43	
11	Mainz 05	34	9	13	12	45	47	−2	40	
12	1. FC Köln	34	9	13	12	34	40	−6	40	
13	Hannover 96	34	9	10	15	40	56	−16	37	
14	VfB Stuttgart	34	9	9	16	42	60	−18	36	
15	Hertha BSC	34	9	8	17	36	52	−16	35	
16	Hamburger SV (O)	34	9	8	17	25	50	−25	35	Qualification for the relegation play-offs
17	SC Freiburg (R)	34	7	13	14	36	47	−11	34	Relegation to 2. Bundesliga
18	SC Paderborn (R)	34	7	10	17	31	65	−34	31	Relegation to 2. Bundesliga

Source: DFB
Rules for classification: 1) points; 2) goal difference; 3) number of goals scored
(C) Champions; (O) Play-off winners; (R) Relegated

==== Results summary ====
Overall								Home						Away					
Pld	W	D	L	GF	GA	GD	Pts	W	D	L	GF	GA	GD	W	D	L	GF	GA	GD
34	9	13	12	34	40	−6	40	4	9	4	18	17	+1	5	4	8	16	23	−7

Last updated: 10 May 2015.
Source: Competitive matches

==== Results by round ====
Round	1	2	3	4	5	6	7	8	9	10	11	12	13	14	15	16	17	18	19	20	21	22	23	24	25	26	27	28	29	30	31	32	33	34
Ground	H	A	A	H	A	H	A	H	A	H	A	H	A	H	A	H	A	A	H	H	A	H	A	H	A	H	A	H	A	H	A	H	A	H
Result	D	W	D	D	L	L	L	W	W	L	W	L	L	L	W	D	L	W	D	D	L	D	L	W	D	D	L	W	D	D	D	W	L	D
Position	12	4	9	8	9	13	14	11	10	11	9	11	12	12	11	10	11	10	10	11	11	13	13	11	12	12	13	11	12	12	11	10	12	12

Updated to match(es) played on 9 May 2015. Source: Bundesliga
A = Away; H = Home; W = Win; D = Draw; L = Loss

==== Matches ====
23 September 2014 1	1. FC Köln	0–0	Hamburger SV	Cologne
15:30 CEST (UTC+02:00)	Lehmann (yellow card) 56'; Risse (yellow card) 79'	Report	Djourou (yellow card) 72'; Van der Vaart (yellow card) 79'	Stadium: RheinEnergieStadion; Attendance: 50,000; Referee: Wolfgang Stark

30 August 2014 2	VfB Stuttgart	0–2	1. FC Köln	Stuttgart
15:30 CEST (UTC+02:00)	Kostić (yellow card) 86'	Report	Osako 22'; Ujah 33'; Risse (yellow card) 40'; Brečko (yellow card) 61'	Stadium: Mercedes-Benz Arena; Attendance: 55,000; Referee: Felix Brych

13 September 2014 3	SC Paderborn 07	0–0	1. FC Köln	Paderborn
15:30 CEST (UTC+02:00)		Report	Zoller (yellow card) 40'; Lehmann (yellow card) 52'	Stadium: Benteler Arena; Attendance: 14,993; Referee: Peter Gagelmann

21 September 2014 4	1. FC Köln	0–0	Borussia Mönchengladbach	Cologne
17:30 CEST (UTC+02:00)	Lehmann (yellow card) 39'; Vogt (yellow card) 73'	Report	Kramer (yellow card) 19'; Hahn (yellow card) 74'	Stadium: RheinEnergieStadion; Attendance: 50,000; Referee: Felix Zwayer

24 August 2014 5	Hannover 96	1–0	1. FC Köln	Hanover
20:00 CEST (UTC+02:00)	Joselu 8'	Report	Peszko (yellow card) 49'; Ujah (yellow card) 90'	Stadium: Niedersachsenstadion; Attendance: 39,400; Referee: Tobias Stieler

27 September 2014 6	1. FC Köln	0–2	Bayern Munich	Cologne
15:30 CEST (UTC+02:00)		Report	Götze 19'; Halfar 66' (o.g.)	Stadium: RheinEnergieStadion; Attendance: 50,000; Referee: Knut Kircher

4 October 2014 7	Eintracht Frankfurt	3–2	1. FC Köln	Frankfurt
18:30 CEST (UTC+02:00)	Meier 44', 54'; Seferovic (yellow card) 55'; Wimmer 79' (o.g.)	Report	Risse 15'; Vogt (yellow card) 61'; Hector 65'	Stadium: Commerzbank-Arena; Attendance: 51,500; Referee: Wolfgang Stark

18 October 2014 8	1. FC Köln	2–1	Borussia Dortmund	Cologne
15:30 CEST (UTC+02:00)	Vogt 40'; Zoller 74'; Lehmann (yellow card) 78'	Report	Mkhitaryan (yellow card) 25'; Hummels (yellow card) 33'; Immobile 48'; Papastathopoulos (yellow card) 72'	Stadium: RheinEnergieStadion; Attendance: 50,000; Referee: Marco Fritz

24 October 2014 9	Werder Bremen	0–1	1. FC Köln	Bremen
20:30 CEST (UTC+02:00)	Caldirola (yellow card) 21'; Junuzović (yellow card) 37'; García (yellow card) 86'	Report	Ujah 59'	Stadium: Weserstadion; Attendance: 42,100; Referee: Felix Brych

2 November 2014 10	1. FC Köln	0–1	SC Freiburg	Cologne
17:30 CET (UTC+01:00)	Vogt (yellow card) 77'	Report	Kerk (yellow card) 25'; Darida 50' (pen.), (yellow card) 72'; Bürki (yellow card) 89'	Stadium: RheinEnergieStadion; Attendance: 49,500; Referee: Peter Gagelmann

8 November 2014 11	1899 Hoffenheim	3–4	1. FC Köln	Sinsheim
15:30 CET (UTC+01:00)	Szalai 2'; Firmino 39', 45'; Beck (yellow card) 62'	Report	Olkowski 5', 83'; Lehmann 12'; Ujah 35', (yellow card) 57'; Vogt (yellow card) 74'	Stadium: Rhein-Neckar Arena; Attendance: 30,150; Referee: Günter Perl

22 November 2014 12	1. FC Köln	1–2	Hertha BSC	Cologne
18:30 CET (UTC+01:00)	Ujah 58'	Report	Stocker (yellow card) 23'; Beerens 28'; Niemeyer (yellow card) 67'; Ndjeng 86'; Skjelbred (yellow card) 90+4'	Stadium: RheinEnergieStadion; Attendance: 49,200; Referee: Tobias Stieler

29 November 2014 13	Bayer Leverkusen	5–1	1. FC Köln	Leverkusen
15:30 CET (UTC+01:00)	Leno (yellow card) 4'; Bellarabi 26', 90'; Çalhanoğlu 61'; Drmić 79', 88'	Report	Lehmann 4' (pen.), (yellow card) 54'; Wimmer (yellow card) 62'	Stadium: BayArena; Attendance: 30,210; Referee: Thorsten Kinhöfer

6 December 2014 14	1. FC Köln	1–2	FC Augsburg	Cologne
15:30 CET (UTC+01:00)	Ujah 13'	Report	Kohr (yellow card) 37'; Đurđić 53'; Esswein 90'	Stadium: RheinEnergieStadion; Attendance: 48,500; Referee: Tobias Welz

13 December 2014 15	Schalke 04	1–2	1. FC Köln	Gelsenkirchen
15:30 CET (UTC+01:00)	Höwedes (yellow card) 66'; Sané 85'	Report	Wimmer (yellow card) 41'; Ujah 47'; Lehmann 67' (pen.)	Stadium: Veltins-Arena; Attendance: 61,516; Referee: Felix Brych

16 December 2014 16	1. FC Köln	0–0	FSV Mainz 05	Cologne
20:00 CET (UTC+01:00)	Vogt (yellow card) 48'; Lehmann (yellow card) 69'	Report	Geis (yellow card) 48'; Díaz (yellow card) 63'; Brosinski (yellow card) 76'; Koo (yellow card) 78'	Stadium: RheinEnergieStadion; Attendance: 42,900; Referee: Florian Meyer

20 December 2014 17	VfL Wolfsburg	2–1	1. FC Köln	Wolfsburg
18:30 CET (UTC+01:00)	Dost 16'; Naldo 78'	Report	Maroh 11'	Stadium: Volkswagen Arena; Attendance: 26,824; Referee: Peter Gagelmann

31 January 2015 18	Hamburger SV	0–2	1. FC Köln	Hamburg
15:30 CET (UTC+01:00)	Van der Vaart (yellow card) 16'; Rajković (yellow card) 62'; Djourou (yellow card) 82'	Report	Peszko (yellow card) 16'; Risse 62', 78'	Stadium: Volksparkstadion; Attendance: 56,053; Referee: Wolfgang Stark

4 February 2015 19	1. FC Köln	0–0	VfB Stuttgart	Cologne
20:00 CET (UTC+01:00)	Gerhardt (yellow card) 73'; Maroh (yellow card) 73'	Report		Stadium: RheinEnergieStadion; Attendance: 48,400; Referee: Tobias Stieler

7 February 2015 20	1. FC Köln	0–0	SC Paderborn 07	Cologne
15:30 CET (UTC+01:00)	Lehmann (yellow card) 79'	Report	Meha (yellow card) 55'; Stoppelkamp (yellow card) 88'	Stadium: RheinEnergieStadion; Attendance: 49,500; Referee: Christian Dingert

14 February 2015 21	Borussia Mönchengladbach	1–0	1. FC Köln	Mönchengladbach
15:30 CET (UTC+01:00)	Xhaka (yellow card) 43', (goal) 90+1'; Hazard (yellow card) 90+3'	Report	Wimmer (yellow card) 24'; Osako (yellow card) 38'; Risse (yellow card) 61'; Peszko (yellow card) 66'	Stadium: Borussia-Park; Attendance: 54,010; Referee: Deniz Aytekin

21 February 2015 22	1. FC Köln	1–1	Hannover 96	Cologne
18:30 CET (UTC+01:00)	Ujah 17'; Vogt (yellow card) 77'; Olkowski (yellow card) 79'	Report	Joselu 5'; Gülselam (yellow card) 27'; Hirsch (yellow card) 47'; Pereira (yellow card) 71' (yellow-red card) 90+1'; Sané (yellow card) 75'	Stadium: RheinEnergieStadion; Attendance: 47,300; Referee: Günter Perl

27 February 2015 23	Bayern Munich	4–1	1. FC Köln	Munich
20:30 CET (UTC+01:00)	Schweinsteiger 3'; Ribéry 10'; Robben 67'; Lewandowski 76'	Report	Ujah 45+1'; Halfar (yellow card) 73'	Stadium: Allianz Arena; Attendance: 75,000; Referee: Daniel Siebert

8 March 2015 24	1. FC Köln	4–2	Eintracht Frankfurt	Cologne
15:30 CET (UTC+01:00)	Peszko (yellow card) 22'; Deyverson 28', (yellow card) 38'; Risse 72'; Osako 79'; Ujah 82'; Wimmer (red card) 90+1'	Report	Seferovic (yellow card) 26'; Meier 58', 90+3' (pen.); Stendera (yellow card) 86'	Stadium: RheinEnergieStadion; Attendance: 50,000; Referee: Knut Kircher

14 March 2015 25	Borussia Dortmund	0–0	1. FC Köln	Dortmund
18:30 CET (UTC+01:00)	Aubameyang (yellow card) 71'; Schmelzer (yellow card) 85'	Report		Stadium: Westfalenstadion; Attendance: 80,667; Referee: Markus Schmidt

21 March 2015 26	1. FC Köln	1–1	Werder Bremen	Cologne
15:30 CET (UTC+01:00)	Deyverson (yellow card) 73'; Lehmann (yellow card) 84', (goal) 88' (pen.)	Report	Selke 27'; Di Santo (yellow card) 71'; Fritz (yellow card) 82'	Stadium: RheinEnergieStadion; Attendance: 50,000; Referee: Robert Hartmann

4 April 2015 27	SC Freiburg	1–0	1. FC Köln	Freiburg im Breisgau
15:30 CEST (UTC+02:00)	Riether (yellow card) 7'; Schmid (yellow card) 34'; Frantz 37'; Krmaš (yellow card) 86'	Report	Deyverson (yellow card) 16'; Peszko (yellow card) 18'	Stadium: Dreisamstadion; Attendance: 23,800; Referee: Bastian Dankert

12 April 2015 28	1. FC Köln	3–2	1899 Hoffenheim	Cologne
15:30 CEST (UTC+02:00)	Lehmann 20' (pen.), (yellow card) 71'; Maroh (yellow card) 29'; Vogt (yellow card) 44'; Ujah 54'; Olkowski (red card) 69'; Hector 78'; Bröker (yellow card) 87'	Report	Bičakčić (yellow card) 19'; Polanski 70' (pen.); Beck (yellow card) 80'; Modeste 88'	Stadium: RheinEnergieStadion; Attendance: 45,000; Referee: Peter Sippel

18 April 2015 29	Hertha BSC	0–0	1. FC Köln	Berlin
15:30 CEST (UTC+02:00)		Report	Hector (yellow card) 36'	Stadium: Olympiastadion; Attendance: 51,203; Referee: Knut Kircher

25 April 2015 30	1. FC Köln	1–1	Bayer Leverkusen	Cologne
15:30 CEST (UTC+02:00)	Gerhardt (yellow card) 44'; Wimmer (yellow card) 55'; Finne 83'	Report	Rolfes (yellow card) 17'; Son (yellow card) 24'; Brandt 60'; Toprak (yellow card) 90+4'	Stadium: RheinEnergieStadion; Attendance: 45,600; Referee: Deniz Aytekin

2 May 2015 31	FC Augsburg	0–0	1. FC Köln	Augsburg
15:30 CEST (UTC+02:00)		Report		Stadium: SGL arena Attendance: 29,158; Referee: Marco Fritz

10 May 2015 32	1. FC Köln	2–0	FC Schalke 04	Cologne
17:30 CEST (UTC+02:00)	Risse 34'; Hector (yellow card) 70'; Gerhardt 89'	Report	Farfán (yellow card) 65'; Höwedes (yellow card) 67'	Stadium: RheinEnergieStadion; Attendance: 46,500; Referee: Wolfgang Stark

16 May 2015 33	FSV Mainz 05	2–0	1. FC Köln	Mainz
15:30 CEST (UTC+02:00)	Noveski (yellow card) 27'; Koo 47'; Jairo 83'	Report	Vogt (yellow card) 60'; Deyverson (yellow card) 72'; Mavraj (yellow card) 84'	Stadium: Coface Arena; Attendance: 33,702; Referee: Günter Perl

23 May 2015 34	1. FC Köln	2–2	VfL Wolfsburg	Cologne
15:30 CEST (UTC+02:00)	Osako 3'; Knoche 61' (o.g.)	Report	Luiz Gustavo 8'; Perišić 15'	Stadium: RheinEnergieStadion; Attendance: 49,200; Referee: Peter Gagelmann

=== DFB-Pokal ===
16 August 2014 Round 1	FT Braunschweig	0–4	1. FC Köln	Braunschweig
15:30 CEST (UTC+02:00)	Krüger (yellow card) 58'	Report	Ujah 46', 52'; Lehmann (yellow card) 44', (goal) 63'; Zoller 87'	Stadium: Eintracht-Stadion; Attendance: 9,067; Referee: Christian Bandurski

28 October 2014 Round 2	MSV Duisburg	0–0 (a.e.t.) (1–4 p)	1. FC Köln	Duisburg
20:30 CET (UTC+01:00)	Meißner (yellow card) 42'; Gardawski (yellow card) 52'; Albutat (yellow card) 60'; Scheidhauer (yellow card) 82'; Onuegbu (yellow card) 103'	Report	Lehmann (yellow card) 18'; Vogt (yellow card) 52'; Peszko (red card) 71'	Stadium: MSV-Arena; Attendance: 30,600; Referee: Peter Sippel
	Penalties
	Grote (penalty missed); Janjić (penalty missed); Feltscher (penalty scored)		(penalty scored) Lehmann; (penalty scored) Vogt; (penalty scored) Wimmer; (penalty scored) Matuszczyk

3 March 2015 Round 3	SC Freiburg	2–1	1. FC Köln	Freiburg im Breisgau
20:30 CET (UTC+01:00)	Ujah 17' (o.g.); Darida 18'; Mujdža (yellow card) 59'; Schahin (yellow card) 87'	Report	Maroh (yellow card) 23'; Lehmann (yellow card) 31'; Ujah (yellow card) 77'; Wimmer (yellow card) 87'; Deyverson 89'	Stadium: Dreisamstadion; Attendance: 18,800; Referee: Manuel Gräfe
