= 2015–16 1. FC Köln season =

1. FC Köln
2015–16 season
- Chairman: Werner Spinner
- Manager: Peter Stöger
- Stadium: RheinEnergieStadion, Cologne
- Bundesliga: 9th
- DFB-Pokal: Second round
- Top goalscorer: League: Anthony Modeste (15); All: Anthony Modeste (18)
Home colours	Away colours	Third colours

== Background ==
1. FC Köln finished the 2014–15 Bundesliga in 12th place, thus ensuring a place in the 2015–16 Bundesliga. The 2015–16 season is the 45th season for the club in the Bundesliga and the second season in their current spell. The percentage of possible seasons in the Bundesliga amounts to 84.9% for the club. At the start of the season the club was on 16th place in the German TV money table.

== Review ==
After matchday 31 the club achieved the goal to play in the Bundesliga in the season 2016/2017 by avoiding relegation. The 2016/2017 season will be the third succeeding season in the Bundesliga for the club since the promotion in 2014. At the end of the season the club will climb in the German TV money table from 16th to the 14th place. Finishing on the 9th position was the best club finish in the Bundesliga since the 1991/1992 season. During the season 1. FC Köln overtook the clubs Hamburger SV and Borussia Mönchengladbach to become the fourth largest club in Germany with 78.518 members in May 2016. Worldwide the club is the 14th largest football club at the moment.

== Players ==
=== Squad ===
As of 20 March 2016

Note: Flags indicate national team as defined under FIFA eligibility rules; some limited exceptions apply. Players may hold more than one non-FIFA nationality.

No.	Pos.	Nation	Player
1	GK	GER	Timo Horn
3	DF	GER	Dominique Heintz
4	DF	DEN	Frederik Sørensen
5	DF	SLO	Dominic Maroh
6	MF	GER	Kevin Vogt
7	MF	GER	Marcel Risse
8	MF	SRB	Miloš Jojić
11	FW	GER	Simon Zoller
13	FW	JPN	Yūya Ōsako
14	DF	GER	Jonas Hector
15	FW	AUT	Philipp Hosiner

No.	Pos.	Nation	Player
16	DF	POL	Paweł Olkowski
18	GK	GER	Thomas Kessler
19	DF	ALB	Mërgim Mavraj
21	MF	GER	Leonardo Bittencourt
25	DF	SRB	Filip Mladenović
27	FW	FRA	Anthony Modeste
29	MF	SVK	Dušan Švento
30	MF	GER	Marcel Hartel
31	MF	GER	Yannick Gerhardt
33	MF	GER	Matthias Lehmann (captain)
37	GK	GER	Daniel Mesenhöler

Players who left the club during the 2015–16 season
Note: Flags indicate national team as defined under FIFA eligibility rules; some limited exceptions apply. Players may hold more than one non-FIFA nationality.

No.	Pos.	Nation	Player
17	MF	POL	Sławomir Peszko
25	MF	JPN	Kazuki Nagasawa
26	FW	NOR	Bård Finne

Players who joined the club during the 2015–16 season
Note: Flags indicate national team as defined under FIFA eligibility rules; some limited exceptions apply. Players may hold more than one non-FIFA nationality.

No.	Pos.	Nation	Player
25	DF	SRB	Filip Mladenović

=== Transfers ===
==== In ====
No.	Pos.	Nat.	Name	Age	EU	Moving from	Type	Transfer window	Ends	Transfer fee	Source
9	FW	(France)	Anthony Modeste	27	EU	1899 Hoffenheim	Transfer	Summer	2019		
8	MF	(Serbia)	Miloš Jojić	23	Non-EU	Borussia Dortmund	Transfer	Summer	2019		
21	MF	(Germany)	Leonardo Bittencourt	21	EU	Hannover 96	Transfer	Summer	2019		
4	DF	(Denmark)	Frederik Sørensen	23	EU	Juventus	Transfer	Summer	2019		
3	DF	(Germany)	Dominique Heintz	21	EU	1. FC Kaiserslautern	Transfer	Summer	2019		
25	DF	(Serbia)	Filip Mladenović	24	EU	BATE Borisov (Belarus)	Transfer	Summer	2019		
15	FW	(Austria)	Philipp Hosiner	26	EU	Rennes	Loan	Summer	2016		

==== Out ====
No.	Pos.	Nat.	Name	Age	EU	Moving to	Type	Transfer window	Transfer fee	Source
28	DF	(Austria)	Kevin Wimmer	22	EU	Tottenham Hotspur (England)	Transfer	Summer		
9	FW	(Nigeria)	Anthony Ujah	24	Non-EU	Werder Bremen	Transfer	Summer		
22	MF	(Germany)	Daniel Halfar	27	EU	1. FC Kaiserslautern	Transfer	Summer		
2	DF	(Slovenia)	Mišo Brečko	31	EU	1. FC Nürnberg	Transfer	Summer		
17	MF	(Poland)	Sławomir Peszko	30	EU	Lechia Gdańsk	Transfer	Summer		
10	FW	(Germany)	Patrick Helmes	31	EU		Retired	Summer		

== Competitions ==
Win Draw Loss

=== Bundesliga ===
==== League table ====
Pos	Team	Pld	W	D	L	GF	GA	GD	Pts	Qualification or relegation
7	Hertha BSC	34	14	8	12	42	42	0	50	Qualification for the Europa League third qualifying round (Note: Since the winners of the 2015–16 DFB-Pokal, Bayern Munich, qualified for the Champions League based on league position, the Europa League group stage spot was passed to the sixth-placed team, Mainz 05; and the Europa League third qualifying round spot was passed to the seventh-placed team, Hertha BSC.)
8	VfL Wolfsburg	34	12	9	13	47	49	−2	45	
9	1. FC Köln	34	10	13	11	38	42	−4	43	
10	Hamburger SV	34	11	8	15	40	46	−6	41	
11	FC Ingolstadt	34	10	10	14	33	42	−9	40	

Source: DFB
Rules for classification: 1) Points; 2) Goal difference; 3) Goals scored; 4) Head-to-head points; 5) Head-to-head goal difference; 6) Head-to-head away goals scored; 7) Away goals scored; 8) Play-offs.

==== Results summary ====
Overall								Home						Away					
Pld	W	D	L	GF	GA	GD	Pts	W	D	L	GF	GA	GD	W	D	L	GF	GA	GD
34	10	13	11	38	42	−4	43	5	5	7	16	18	−2	5	8	4	22	24	−2

Last updated: 14 May 2016.
Source: Bundesliga

==== Results by round ====
Round	1	2	3	4	5	6	7	8	9	10	11	12	13	14	15	16	17	18	19	20	21	22	23	24	25	26	27	28	29	30	31	32	33	34
Ground	A	H	H	A	H	A	H	A	H	A	H	A	H	A	H	A	H	H	A	A	H	A	H	A	H	A	H	A	H	A	H	A	H	A
Result	W	D	W	L	W	L	D	W	L	L	D	W	D	D	L	D	W	L	D	D	W	L	L	D	L	W	L	D	L	W	W	D	D	D
Position	4	5	4	8	5	7	7	5	6	9	9	7	9	10	10	10	9	9	9	9	9	9	10	10	12	9	9	11	11	10	8	8	9	9

Updated to match(es) played on 14 May 2016. Source: Bundesliga
A = Away; H = Home; W = Win; D = Draw; L = Loss

==== Matches ====
16 August 2015 1	VfB Stuttgart	1–3	1. FC Köln	Stuttgart
17:30 CEST (UTC+02:00)	Baumgartl (yellow card) 34'; Gentner (yellow card) 67'; Insúa (yellow card) 71'; Didavi 79' (pen.)	Report	Sørensen (yellow card) 61'; Vogt (yellow card) 61'; Modeste 75' (pen.); Zoller 77'; Osako 90+2'	Stadium: Mercedes-Benz Arena; Attendance: 59,500; Referee: Wolfgang Stark

22 August 2015 2	1. FC Köln	1–1	VfL Wolfsburg	Cologne
15:30 CEST (UTC+02:00)	Zoller 30'; Lehmann (yellow card) 72'; Vogt (yellow card) 78'	Report	Bendtner 83'; Klose (yellow card) 88'	Stadium: RheinEnergieSTADION; Attendance: 46,000; Referee: Knut Kircher

29 August 2015 3	1. FC Köln	2–1	Hamburger SV	Cologne
15:30 CEST (UTC+02:00)	Zoller (yellow card) 42'; Vogt (yellow card) 68'; Hosiner 76'; Modeste 81' (pen.); Risse (yellow card) 83'	Report	Holtby 47'; Schipplock (yellow card) 49'; Ekdal (yellow card) 55'; Spahić (red card) 79'	Stadium: RheinEnergieSTADION; Attendance: 50,000; Referee: Deniz Aytekin

12 September 2015 4	Eintracht Frankfurt	6–2	1. FC Köln	Frankfurt
18:30 CEST (UTC+02:00)	Stendera (yellow card) 1'; Meier 4', 23', 87'; Castaignos 15', 30'; Reinartz (yellow card) 63'; Seferovic 73'	Report	Modeste 28'; Heintz 81'; Hector (yellow card) 89'	Stadium: Commerzbank-Arena; Attendance: 51,500; Referee: Marco Fritz

19 September 2015 5	1. FC Köln	1–0	Borussia Mönchengladbach	Cologne
15:30 CEST (UTC+02:00)	Modeste 64'	Report	Xhaka (yellow card) 23'; Hazard (yellow card) 70'; Wendt (yellow card) 78'	Stadium: RheinEnergieSTADION; Attendance: 47,800; Referee: Felix Brych

22 September 2015 6	Hertha BSC	2–0	1. FC Köln	Berlin
20:00 CEST (UTC+02:00)	Skjelbred (yellow card) 11'; Ibišević 43', 90+4'	Report	Hosiner (yellow card) 73'	Stadium: Olympiastadion; Attendance: 40,181; Referee: Florian Meyer

25 September 2015 7	1. FC Köln	1–1	FC Ingolstadt	Cologne
20:30 CEST (UTC+02:00)	Modeste 10'; Heintz (yellow card) 62'; Lehmann (yellow card) 85'	Report	Matip 21', (yellow card) 64'; Leckie (yellow card) 76'; Hübner (yellow card) 80'	Stadium: RheinEnergieSTADION; Attendance: 47,800; Referee: Christian Dingert

4 October 2015 8	Schalke 04	0–3	1. FC Köln	Gelsenkirchen
15:30 CEST (UTC+02:00)	Geis (yellow card) 79'; Meyer (yellow card) 90+2'	Report	Modeste 45'; Bittencourt (yellow card) 50'; Risse (yellow card) 69'; Gerhardt 79'; Zoller 84'	Stadium: Veltins-Arena; Attendance: 61,723; Referee: Knut Kircher

18 October 2015 9	1. FC Köln	0–1	Hannover 96	Cologne
15:30 CEST (UTC+02:00)	Sørensen (yellow card) 21'; Osako (yellow card) 49'; Risse (yellow card) 81'	Report	Schmiedebach (yellow card) 23'; Andreasen 38'; Sané (yellow card) 67'	Stadium: RheinEnergieSTADION; Attendance: 48,700; Referee: Bastian Dankert

24 October 2015 10	Bayern Munich	4–0	1. FC Köln	Munich
15:30 CEST (UTC+02:00)	Robben 35'; Vidal 40'; Rafinha (yellow card) 55'; Lewandowski 62'; Müller 77' (pen.)	Report	Lehmann (yellow card) 61'	Stadium: Allianz Arena; Attendance: 75,000; Referee: Florian Meyer

31 October 2015 11	1. FC Köln	0–0	TSG Hoffenheim	Cologne
15:30 CET (UTC+01:00)	Osako (yellow card) 66'; Maroh (yellow card) 74'	Report	Schwegler (yellow card) 30'	Stadium: RheinEnergieSTADION; Attendance: 48,000; Referee: Günter Perl

7 November 2015 12	Bayer Leverkusen	1–2	1. FC Köln	Leverkusen
15:30 CET (UTC+01:00)	Hernández 33'; Papadopoulos (red card) 53'; Ramalho (yellow card) 86'	Report	Maroh 17', 72'; Bittencourt (yellow card) 40'; Heintz (yellow card) 65'	Stadium: BayArena; Attendance: 30,210; Referee: Felix Zwayer

21 November 2015 13	1. FC Köln	0–0	Mainz 05	Cologne
15:30 CET (UTC+01:00)	Modeste (yellow card) 34'	Report	Muto (yellow card) 61'	Stadium: RheinEnergieSTADION; Attendance: 46,700; Referee: Wolfgang Stark

27 November 2015 14	Darmstadt 98	0–0	1. FC Köln	Darmstadt
20:30 CET (UTC+01:00)	Garics (yellow card) 45'; Sulu (yellow card) 74'	Report	Zoller (yellow card) 80'	Stadium: Merck-Stadion am Böllenfalltor; Attendance: 17,000; Referee: Deniz Aytekin

5 December 2015 15	1. FC Köln	0–1	FC Augsburg	Cologne
15:30 CET (UTC+01:00)	Hector (yellow card) 76'; Maroh (yellow card) 86'	Report	Verhaegh (yellow card) 54'; Feulner (yellow card) 56'; Baier (yellow card) 58'; Bobadilla 64', (yellow card) 83'	Stadium: RheinEnergieSTADION; Attendance: 45,500; Referee: Daniel Siebert

12 December 2015 16	Werder Bremen	1–1	1. FC Köln	Bremen
15:30 CET (UTC+01:00)	Vestergaard 4'; Bartels (yellow card) 70'; Öztunalı (yellow card) 70'; Fritz (yellow card) 83'	Report	Vogt (yellow card) 45+1'; Gerhardt (yellow card) 50'; Švento 79'	Stadium: Weserstadion; Attendance: 40,727; Referee: Guido Winkmann

19 December 2015 17	1. FC Köln	2–1	Borussia Dortmund	Cologne
15:30 CET (UTC+01:00)	Lehmann (yellow card) 72'; Zoller 82', (yellow card) 83'; Modeste 90', (yellow card) 90+1'	Report	Papastathopoulos 18'; Aubameyang (yellow card) 67'	Stadium: RheinEnergieSTADION; Attendance: 50,000; Referee: Knut Kircher

23 January 2016 18	1. FC Köln	1–3	VfB Stuttgart	Cologne
15:30 CET (UTC+01:00)	Modeste 19' (pen.)	Report	Niedermeier (yellow card) 18'; Didavi 36'; Werner 51'; Gentner 83'	Stadium: RheinEnergieSTADION; Attendance: 50,000; Referee: Manuel Gräfe

31 January 2016 19	VfL Wolfsburg	1–1	1. FC Köln	Wolfsburg
15:30 CET (UTC+01:00)	Draxler 67'; Luiz Gustavo (yellow card) 77'; Jung (yellow card) 82'; Bendtner (yellow card) 89'	Report	Lehmann (yellow card) 45'; Modeste 75'	Stadium: Volkswagen Arena; Attendance: 29,156; Referee: Wolfgang Stark

7 February 2016 20	Hamburger SV	1–1	1. FC Köln	Hamburg
15:30 CET (UTC+01:00)	Djourou (yellow card) 45'; N. Müller 47'; Kačar (yellow card) 56'; Holtby (yellow card) 58'; Spahić (yellow card) 65'; Schipplock (yellow card) 89'	Report	Zoller 41'; Mladenović (yellow card) 49'; Risse (yellow card) 71'	Stadium: Volksparkstadion; Attendance: 51,999; Referee: Felix Brych

13 February 2016 21	1. FC Köln	3–1	Eintracht Frankfurt	Cologne
18:30 CET (UTC+01:00)	Gerhardt 29'; Risse (yellow card) 54'; Heintz 57'; Modeste (yellow card) 66', (goal) 72'	Report	Fabián (yellow card) 19'; Meier 24'; Regäsel (yellow card) 50'; Hasebe (yellow card) 52'; Stendera (yellow card) 66'; Russ (yellow card) 66'; Oczipka (yellow card) 82'	Stadium: RheinEnergieSTADION; Attendance: 49,200; Referee: Felix Zwayer

20 February 2016 22	Borussia Mönchengladbach	1–0	1. FC Köln	Mönchengladbach
15:30 CET (UTC+01:00)	Dahoud 9'; Stindl (yellow card) 46'; Raffael (yellow card) 70'	Report	Maroh (yellow card) 46'; Olkowski (yellow card) 83'; Hosiner (yellow card) 88'	Stadium: Stadion im Borussia-Park; Attendance: 52,226; Referee: Knut Kircher

26 February 2016 23	1. FC Köln	0–1	Hertha BSC	Cologne
20:30 CET (UTC+01:00)	Modeste (yellow card) 52'; Jojić (yellow card) 78'	Report	Ibišević 43'; Brooks (yellow card) 67'; Plattenhardt (yellow card) 71'	Stadium: RheinEnergieSTADION; Attendance: 48,900; Referee: Tobias Stieler

1 March 2016 24	FC Ingolstadt	1–1	1. FC Köln	Ingolstadt
20:00 CET (UTC+01:00)	Lezcano (yellow card) 29'; Hinterseer 36'; Bauer (yellow card) 75'	Report	Maroh (yellow card) 53'; Modeste 72'	Stadium: Audi Sportpark; Attendance: 14,503; Referee: Florian Meyer

5 March 2016 25	1. FC Köln	1–3	Schalke 04	Cologne
15:30 CET (UTC+01:00)	Maroh (yellow card) 2'; Bittencourt 33'	Report	Huntelaar 2' (pen.); Meyer 23'; Di Santo 76'	Stadium: RheinEnergieSTADION; Attendance: 49,300; Referee: Wolfgang Stark

12 March 2016 26	Hannover 96	0–2	1. FC Köln	Hanover
15:30 CET (UTC+01:00)	Schmiedebach (yellow card) 69'	Report	Bittencourt 43', 61'; Sørensen (yellow card) 49'	Stadium: HDI-Arena; Attendance: 40,600; Referee: Peter Sippel

19 March 2016 27	1. FC Köln	0–1	Bayern Munich	Cologne
15:30 CET (UTC+01:00)	Sørensen (yellow card) 89'	Report	Lewandowski 10'; Lahm (yellow card) 86'	Stadium: RheinEnergieSTADION; Attendance: 49,600; Referee: Tobias Welz

3 April 2016 28	TSG Hoffenheim	1–1	1. FC Köln	Sinsheim
17:30 CEST (UTC+02:00)	Amiri (yellow card) 7'; Rudy (yellow card) 39'; Volland 90+1'	Report	Zoller 69', (yellow card) 72'	Stadium: Wirsol Rhein-Neckar-Arena; Attendance: 30,150; Referee: Deniz Aytekin

10 April 2016 29	1. FC Köln	0–2	Bayer Leverkusen	Cologne
17:30 CEST (UTC+02:00)	Heintz (yellow card) 90+3'; Bittencourt (red card) 90+6'	Report	Wendell (yellow card) 9' (yellow-red card) 90+6'; Brandt 39'; Hernández 44'; Ramalho (yellow card) 70'; Aránguiz (yellow card) 76'	Stadium: RheinEnergieSTADION; Attendance: 50,000; Referee: Manuel Gräfe

17 April 2016 30	Mainz 05	2–3	1. FC Köln	Mainz
17:30 CEST (UTC+02:00)	Córdoba 8'; Balogun 49'; Donati (yellow card) 67'	Report	Mavraj (yellow card) 48'; Risse 64'; Jojić 74'; Gerhardt (yellow card) 79'; Modeste 83'	Stadium: Coface Arena; Attendance: 33,275; Referee: Peter Sippel

23 April 2016 31	1. FC Köln	4–1	Darmstadt 98	Cologne
15:30 CEST (UTC+02:00)	Modeste 4', 35'; Risse 52', 75'; Gerhardt (yellow card) 59'; Lehmann (yellow card) 72'	Report	Gondorf 12', (yellow card) 81'; Garics (yellow card) 86'	Stadium: RheinEnergieSTADION; Attendance: 50,000; Referee: Christian Dingert

29 April 2016 32	FC Augsburg	0–0	1. FC Köln	Augsburg
20:30 CEST (UTC+02:00)	Koo (yellow card) 62'; Altıntop (yellow card) 77'; Kohr (yellow card) 90+3'	Report	Lehmann (yellow card) 44' (yellow-red card) 56'; Jojić (yellow card) 66'; Maroh (yellow card) 84'	Stadium: WWK ARENA; Attendance: 30,144; Referee: Tobias Welz

7 May 2016 33	1. FC Köln	0–0	Werder Bremen	Cologne
15:30 CEST (UTC+02:00)	Maroh (yellow card) 24'; Hector (yellow card) 51'; Sørensen (yellow card) 61'	Report	Grillitsch (yellow card) 38'; Bartels (yellow card) 79'	Stadium: RheinEnergieSTADION; Attendance: 50,000; Referee: Felix Zwayer

14 May 2016 34	Borussia Dortmund	2–2	1. FC Köln	Dortmund
15:30 CEST (UTC+02:00)	Castro 11'; Papastathopoulos (yellow card) 45'; Reus 75'	Report	Modeste 27'; Jojić 43'	Stadium: Signal Iduna Park; Attendance: 81,359; Referee: Michael Weiner

=== DFB-Pokal ===
8 August 2015 Round 1	SV Meppen	0–4	1. FC Köln	Meppen
15:30 CEST (UTC+02:00)	Gommert (red card) 24'	Report	Modeste 1', 27' (pen.), 78'; Olkowski (yellow card) 8'; Zoller 87'	Stadium: Hänsch-Arena; Attendance: 13,815; Referee: Christian Dietz

28 October 2015 Round 2	Werder Bremen	1–0	1. FC Köln	Bremen
20:30 CET (UTC+01:00)	Ujah 23'	Report	Modeste (yellow card) 39'	Stadium: Weserstadion; Attendance: 40,052; Referee: Felix Brych

== Statistics ==
=== Goalscorers ===
No.	Pos	Nat	Player	Total		Bundesliga		DFB-Pokal	
No.	Pos	Nat	Player	Apps	Goals	Apps	Goals	Apps	Goals
27	FW	(France) FRA	Anthony Modeste	36	18	34	15	2	3
11	FW	(Germany) GER	Simon Zoller	26	7	24	6	2	1
21	MF	(Germany) GER	Leonardo Bittencourt	30	3	29	3	1	0
7	MF	(Germany) GER	Marcel Risse	35	3	33	3	2	0
8	MF	(Serbia) SRB	Miloš Jojić	17	2	15	2	2	0
5	DF	(Slovenia) SLO	Dominic Maroh	25	2	25	2	0	0
8	MF	(Germany) GER	Yannick Gerhardt	30	2	29	2	1	0
3	DF	(Germany) GER	Dominique Heintz	35	2	33	2	2	0
29	MF	(Slovenia) SLO	Dušan Švento	8	1	7	1	1	0
15	FW	(Austria) AUT	Philipp Hosiner	15	1	15	1	0	0
13	FW	(Japan) JPN	Yuya Osako	27	1	25	1	2	0

As of 14 May 2016

=== Assists ===
No.	Pos	Nat	Player	Total		Bundesliga		DFB-Pokal	
No.	Pos	Nat	Player	Apps	Goals	Apps	Goals	Apps	Goals
7	MF	(Germany) GER	Marcel Risse	35	7	33	7	2	0
8	MF	(Germany) GER	Yannick Gerhardt	30	5	29	4	1	1
21	MF	(Germany) GER	Leonardo Bittencourt	30	4	29	4	1	0
14	DF	(Germany) GER	Jonas Hector	34	4	32	4	2	0
27	FW	(France) FRA	Anthony Modeste	36	3	34	3	2	0
25	DF	(Serbia) SRB	Filip Mladenović	14	2	14	2	0	0
16	DF	(Poland) POL	Paweł Olkowski	20	2	19	1	1	1
4	DF	(Denmark) DEN	Frederik Sørensen	24	2	22	2	2	0
6	MF	(Germany) GER	Kevin Vogt	25	2	23	2	2	0
13	FW	(Japan) JPN	Yuya Osako	27	2	25	1	2	1
33	MF	(Germany) GER	Matthias Lehmann	34	2	32	2	2	0
5	DF	(Slovenia) SLO	Dominic Maroh	25	1	25	1	0	0
11	FW	(Germany) GER	Simon Zoller	26	1	24	1	2	0
3	DF	(Germany) GER	Dominique Heintz	35	1	33	0	2	1

As of 14 May 2016

=== By competition ===
Competition	First match	Last match	Starting round	Final position	Record							
Competition	First match	Last match	Starting round	Final position	G	W	D	L	GF	GA	GD	Win %
Bundesliga	16.08.2015	14.05.2016	Matchday 1		34	10	13	11	38	42	−4	29.41
DFB-Pokal	08.08.2015		Round 1	Round 2	2	1	0	1	4	1	+3	50.00
Total					36	11	13	12	42	43	−1	30.56
Updated: 14 May 2016

=== Attendance figures ===
The average attendance in the 2015-2016 Bundesliga season was 48.676.
So the utilisation of the stadium amounts to 97.35%.
As of 14 May 2016

=== Disciplinary record ===
Competition	Record			
Competition	Games	Red cards	Yellow/Red	Yello cards
Bundesliga	34	1	1	55
DFB-Pokal	2	0	0	2
Total	36	1	1	57
Updated: 14 May 2016
