= Marcel Risse =

German footballer (born 1989)

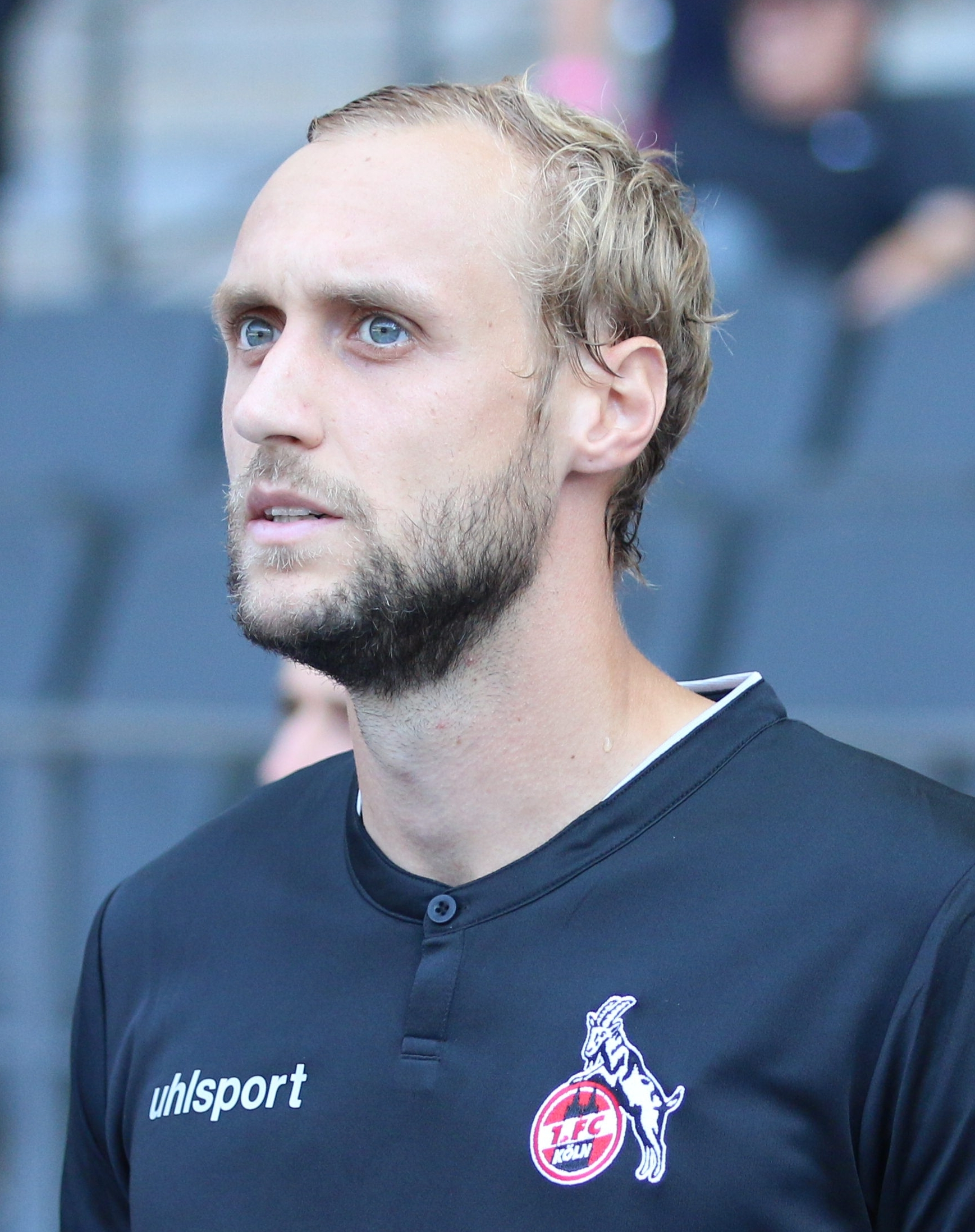
- Risse in 2018

Personal information
- Date of birth: 17 December 1989 (age 36)
- Place of birth: Cologne, West Germany
- Height: 1.83 m (6 ft 0 in)
- Position: Attacking midfielder

Youth career
- 1993–1996: TuS Höhenhaus
- 1996–2006: Bayer Leverkusen

Senior career*
Years	Team	Apps	(Gls)
2006–2008	Bayer Leverkusen II	6	(1)
2007–2011	Bayer Leverkusen	3	(0)
2008–2010	→ 1. FC Nürnberg (loan)	32	(0)
2010–2011	→ Mainz 05 (loan)	25	(2)
2010–2011	→ Mainz 05 II (loan)	1	(0)
2011–2013	Mainz 05	31	(2)
2012–2013	Mainz 05 II	2	(0)
2013–2021	1. FC Köln	149	(21)
2020–2021	→ Viktoria Köln (loan)	29	(4)
2021–2023	Viktoria Köln	60	(6)
Total		338	(36)

International career
2008	Germany U19	11	(4)
2008–2009	Germany U20	4	(1)
- * Club domestic league appearances and goals

Marcel Risse (born 17 December 1989) is a German former professional footballer who played as an attacking midfielder. He has played for Bayer Leverkusen, 1. FC Nürnberg, Mainz 05, 1. FC Köln and Viktoria Köln.

== Club career ==
=== Bayer Leverkusen ===
Risse was born in Cologne. He played for Bayer Leverkusen II during the 2006–07 season where he played in only one match. During the 2007–08 season, he went on to make his first team debut. He went on to play in three matches that season. However, the following season, he went back to playing for the reserve team before moving on loan to 1. FC Nürnberg. He ended up scoring one goal in five matches for the reserve team in 2008–09 season.

=== 1. FC Köln ===
In June 2013, Risse signed a contract with 1. FC Köln. He ended his first season with 11 goals in 31 matches. The following season, in 2014–15, Risse scored five goals in 31 matches. In the 2015–16 season, he scored three goals in 35 matches, while in the 2016–17 season he scored three goals in 15 matches.

On 28 April 2018, Risse played in Köln's 3–2 defeat to SC Freiburg, which confirmed his team's relegation to the 2. Bundesliga. In August 2020, it was announced that Risse would join 3. Liga club FC Viktoria Köln on a loan deal.

=== Viktoria Köln ===
On 8 July 2021, it was reported that 1. FC Köln had terminated Risse's contract and that he would join Viktoria Köln on a permanent basis.

== International career ==
Risse is a youth international for Germany, having played for both the under-19 and under-20 national teams.

== Career statistics ==
Appearances and goals by club, season and competition
Club	Season	League			Cup		Continental (Note: Includes UEFA Cup/UEFA Europa League.)		Other (Note: Includes relegation, promotion play-off.)		Total		Ref.
Club	Season	Division	Apps	Goals	Apps	Goals	Apps	Goals	Apps	Goals	Apps	Goals	Ref.
Bayer Leverkusen II	2006–07	Regionalliga Nord	1	0	—		—		—		1	0	
Bayer Leverkusen II	2008–09	Regionalliga West	5	1	—		—		—		5	1	
Bayer Leverkusen II	Total		6	1	—						6	1	—
Bayer Leverkusen	2007–08	Bundesliga	3	0	0	0	0	0	—		3	0	
1. FC Nürnberg	2008–09	2. Bundesliga	12	0	0	0	—		1	0	13	0	
1. FC Nürnberg	2009–10	Bundesliga	20	0	1	0	—		2	0	23	0	
1. FC Nürnberg	Total		32	0	1	0	—		3	0	36	0	—
Mainz 05 (loan)	2010–11	Bundesliga	25	2	1	0	—		—		26	2	
Mainz 05 II (loan)	2010–11	Regionalliga West	1	0	—		—		—		1	0	
Mainz 05	2011–12	Bundesliga	10	1	2	0	2	1	—		14	2	
Mainz 05	2012–13	Bundesliga	21	1	2	0	—		—		23	1	
Mainz 05	Total		31	2	4	0	2	1	—		37	3	—
Mainz 05 II	2012–13	Regionalliga Südwest	2	0	—		—		—		2	0	
1. FC Köln	2013–14	2. Bundesliga	31	9	3	2	—		—		34	11	
1. FC Köln	2014–15	Bundesliga	29	5	2	0	—		—		31	5	
1. FC Köln	2015–16	Bundesliga	33	3	2	0	—		—		35	3	
1. FC Köln	2016–17	Bundesliga	13	2	2	2	—		—		15	4	
1. FC Köln	2017–18	Bundesliga	16	1	1	0	1	0	—		18	1	
1. FC Köln	2018–19	Bundesliga	21	1	2	1	—		—		23	2	
1. FC Köln	2019–20	Bundesliga	6	0	1	0	—		—		7	0	
1. FC Köln	Total		149	21	13	5	1	0	0	0	163	26	—
Viktoria Köln (loan)	2020–21	3. Liga	29	4	0	0	—		—		29	4	
Viktoria Köln	2021–22	3. Liga	34	3	0	0	—		—		34	3	
Viktoria Köln	2022–23	3. Liga	26	3	1	0	—		—		27	3	
Viktoria Köln	Total		60	6	1	0	0	0	0	0	61	6	—
Career Total			338	36	20	5	3	1	3	0	364	42	—
