= 2022–23 Górnik Zabrze season =

Górnik Zabrze
2022–23 season
- Stadium: Arena Zabrze
- Ekstraklasa: 12th
- Polish Cup: Round of 16
Home colours	Away colours

The 2022–23 season is Górnik Zabrze's 75th season in existence and the club's sixth consecutive season in the top flight of Polish football. In addition to the domestic league, Górnik Zabrze will participate in this season's edition of the Polish Cup. The season covers the period from 1 July 2022 to 30 June 2023.

== Players ==
=== First-team squad ===
As of 16 October 2022.

Note: Flags indicate national team as defined under FIFA eligibility rules; some limited exceptions apply. Players may hold more than one non-FIFA nationality.

No.	Pos.	Nation	Player
1	GK	POL	Daniel Bielica
3	DF	FIN	Richard Jensen
4	DF	POL	Aleksander Paluszek
5	DF	POL	Kryspin Szcześniak (on loan from Pogoń Szczecin)
7	MF	ESP	Dani Pacheco
8	MF	SLO	Blaž Vrhovec
10	FW	GER	Lukas Podolski
11	MF	POL	Mateusz Cholewiak
13	DF	SWE	Emil Bergström
15	MF	POL	Norbert Wojtuszek
16	DF	POL	Paweł Olkowski
17	MF	SUI	Robin Kamber
20	FW	POL	Szymon Włodarczyk

No.	Pos.	Nation	Player
21	FW	POL	Piotr Krawczyk
23	MF	CMR	Jean Jules
24	MF	POL	Krzysztof Kolanko
25	DF	GER	Jonatan Kotzke
26	DF	POL	Rafał Janicki
28	FW	POL	Jan Ciućka
31	GK	POL	Paweł Sokół
32	GK	GER	Kevin Broll
33	MF	JPN	Kanji Okunuki (on loan from Omiya Ardija)
64	DF	SLO	Erik Janža (captain)
71	FW	SLO	Amadej Maroša
77	DF	POL	Jakub Szymański
96	DF	POL	Robert Dadok

=== Out on loan ===
Note: Flags indicate national team as defined under FIFA eligibility rules; some limited exceptions apply. Players may hold more than one non-FIFA nationality.

No.	Pos.	Nation	Player
29	MF	POL	Adrian Dziedzic (at Garbarnia Kraków until 30 June 2023)
—	GK	POL	Jakub Grzesiak (at Stomil Olsztyn until 30 June 2023)
—	GK	POL	Bartosz Neugebauer (at Chojniczanka Chojnice until 30 June 2023)

No.	Pos.	Nation	Player
—	DF	POL	Krzysztof Wingralek (at Znicz Pruszków until 30 June 2023)
—	MF	POL	Mateusz Ziółkowski (at Zagłębie Sosnowiec until 30 June 2023)

== Pre-season and friendlies ==
Win Draw Loss Fixtures

== Competitions ==
=== Overview ===
Competition	First match	Last match	Starting round	Final position	Record							
Competition	First match	Last match	Starting round	Final position	Pld	W	D	L	GF	GA	GD	Win %
Ekstraklasa	15 July 2022	27 May 2023	Matchday 1		27	7	8	12	33	40	−7	25.93
Polish Cup	1 September 2022	8 November 2022	First round	Round of 16	3	2	1	0	6	4	+2	66.67
Total					30	9	9	12	39	44	−5	30.00

Last updated: 6 April 2023
Source: Competitions

=== Ekstraklasa ===
==== League table ====
Pos	Team	Pld	W	D	L	GF	GA	GD	Pts	Qualification or relegation
4	Pogoń Szczecin	34	17	9	8	57	46	+11	60	Qualification for the Europa Conference League second qualifying round (Note: Since the winner of the 2022–23 Polish Cup qualified for the Europa Conference League based on league position, the third Europa Conference League second qualifying round berth was transferred to the 4th-placed team.)
5	Piast Gliwice	34	15	8	11	40	31	+9	53	
6	Górnik Zabrze	34	13	9	12	45	43	+2	48	
7	Cracovia	34	12	10	12	41	35	+6	46	
8	Warta Poznań	34	12	9	13	37	35	+2	45	

Source: ekstraklasa.org
Rules for classification: 1) Points; 2) Head-to-head points; 3) Head-to-head goal difference; 4) Goal difference; 5) Goals scored; 6) Number of wins; 7) Number of away wins; 8) Lower number of points based on yellow and red cards (red card = 3 points, yellow card = 1 point, sending-off = 3 points - including 1 point for first yellow card); 9) Fairplay ranking; 10) Draw. (Note: Head-to-head record is used only after all the matches between the teams in question have been played)

==== Results summary ====
Overall								Home						Away					
Pld	W	D	L	GF	GA	GD	Pts	W	D	L	GF	GA	GD	W	D	L	GF	GA	GD
0	0	0	0	0	0	0	0	0	0	0	0	0	0	0	0	0	0	0	0

Last updated: 6 April 2023.
Source: PKO Ekstraklasa

==== Results by round ====
Round	1	2	3	4	5	6	7	8	9	10	11	12	13	14	15	16	17	18	19	20	21	22	23	24	25	26	27	28
Ground	H	A	A	H	H	A	H	A	H	A	H	A	H	A	H	A	H	A	H	H	A	A	H	A	H	A	H	A
Result	L	L	W	W	L	D	D	D	D	W	L	L	L	D	W	W	L	L	D	D	L	W	L	L	W	L	D	
Position																												

Updated to match(es) played on 6 April 2023. Source: PKO Ekstraklasa
A = Away; H = Home; W = Win; D = Draw; L = Loss

==== Matches ====
The league fixtures were announced on 1 June 2022.

18 July 2022 1	Górnik Zabrze	0–2	Cracovia	Zabrze
				Stadium: Stadion im. Ernesta Pohla
