= Matthias Lehmann =

German former professional footballer (born 1983)

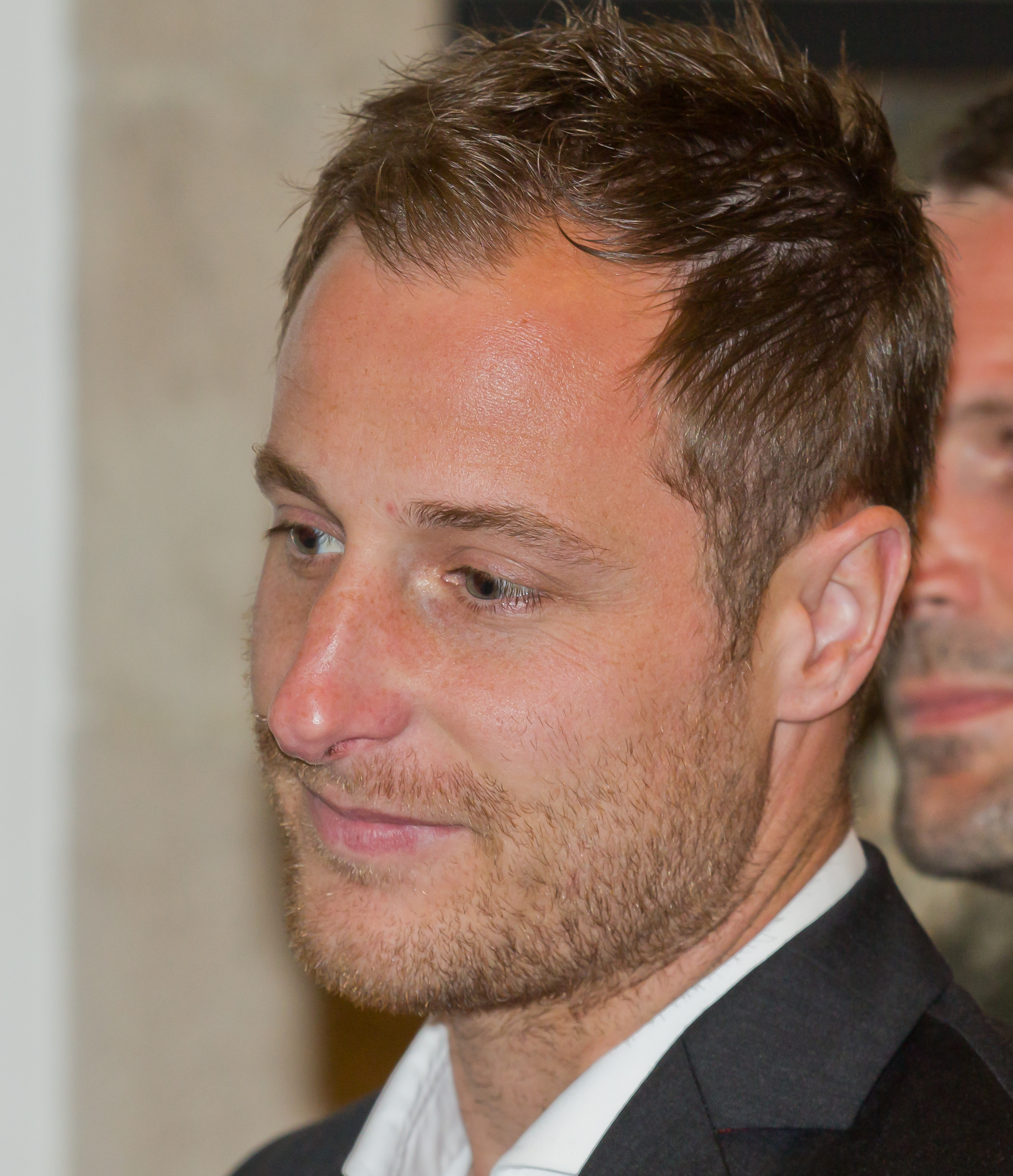
- Lehmann in 2014

Personal information
- Date of birth: 28 May 1983 (age 43)
- Place of birth: Ulm, West Germany
- Height: 1.79 m (5 ft 10 in)
- Position: Midfielder

Youth career
- 1987–1994: VfL Ulm
- 1994–2000: SSV Ulm

Senior career*
Years	Team	Apps	(Gls)
2000–2001	SSV Ulm	4	(0)
2001–2003	VfB Stuttgart II	58	(8)
2003–2004	1860 Munich II	13	(3)
2003–2006	1860 Munich	81	(12)
2006	Alemannia Aachen II	1	(0)
2006–2009	Alemannia Aachen	95	(12)
2009–2011	FC St. Pauli	66	(13)
2011–2012	Eintracht Frankfurt	26	(0)
2012–2019	1. FC Köln	180	(5)
Total		524	(53)

International career
2001–2002	Germany U19	9	(0)
2002–2004	Germany U20	17	(0)
2004–2006	Germany U21	15	(2)
- * Club domestic league appearances and goals

Matthias Lehmann (born 28 May 1983) is a German former professional footballer who played as a midfielder.

== Career ==
=== SSV Ulm ===
Born in Ulm, Lehmann started his career with SSV Ulm 1846 in the 2000–01 season. He made four appearances, against Rot-Weiß Oberhausen, FC St. Pauli, LR Aalen, and Waldhof Mannheim in the 2. Bundesliga.

=== VfB Stuttgart ===
Lehmann moved to VfB Stuttgart II where he scored a goal in 24 league appearances and made a German Cup appearance against Greuther Fürth during the 2001–02 season. Stuttgart II finished in 16th place in the Regionalliga Süd and were relegated.

=== 1860 Munich ===
Lehmann joined 1860 Munich for the 2003–04 season. In his first season, he scored a goal in 17 league appearances. 1860 Munich finished the season in 18th place in the Bundesliga and were relegated. He went on to score six goals in 34 appearances during the 2004–05 season and six goals in 35 appearances during the 2005–06 season.

=== Alemannia Aachen ===
Lehmann moved to Alemannia Aachen for the 2006–07 season. In his first season with the club, he scored three goals in 34 appearances in all competitions. He also made an appearance for the reserve team. He went on to score seven goals in 69 appearances in the 2007–08 and 2008–09 seasons.

=== FC St. Pauli ===
Lehmann spent the 2009–10 and 2010–11 seasons with FC St. Pauli. He scored eight goals in 35 appearances in all competitions in his first season and five goals in 34 appearances in all competitions in his second season.

=== Eintracht Frankfurt ===
In June 2011, Lehmann joined Eintracht Frankfurt, reportedly signing a three-year contract while Eintracht Frankfurt paid St. Pauli a fixed transfer fee of €500,000. He made 26 league appearances and two in the DFB-Pokal.

=== 1. FC Köln ===
In June 2012, Lehmann signed for 1. FC Köln. In his first season, he made 29 appearances in all competitions without scoring a goal. He went on to make 26 appearances without scoring the following season. During the 2014–15 season, he scored five goals in 32 league appearances including three goals in four appearances. During the 2015–16 season, he has made five appearances without scoring. Having risen to the captaincy, Lehmann spent seven seasons at Köln. At the end of the 2018-19 season, it was announced that Lehmann would end his career at the club. He played his last career game on 19 May 2019 against FC Magdeburg.

== International career ==
Lehmann was a youth international for Germany.

== Career statistics ==
Appearances and goals by club, season and competition
Club	Season	League			Cup		Europe		Total		Ref.
Club	Season	League	Apps	Goals	Apps	Goals	Apps	Goals	Apps	Goals	Ref.
SSV Ulm	2000–01	2. Bundesliga	4	0	0	0	—		4	0	
VfB Stuttgart II	2001–02	Regionalliga Süd	24	1	1	0	—		25	1	
VfB Stuttgart II	2002–03	Oberliga Baden-Württemberg	34	7	—		—		34	7	
VfB Stuttgart II	Total		58	8	1	0	—		59	8	—
1860 Munich II	2003–04	Bayernliga	13	3	0	0	—		13	3	
1860 Munich	2003–04	Bundesliga	17	1	0	0	—		17	1	
1860 Munich	2004–05	2. Bundesliga	32	6	2	0	—		34	6	
1860 Munich	2005–06	2. Bundesliga	32	5	3	1	—		35	6	
1860 Munich	Total		81	12	5	1	—		86	13	—
Alemannia Aachen II	2006–07	Oberliga Nordrhein	1	0	—		—		1	0	
Alemannia Aachen	2006–07	Bundesliga	30	3	4	0	—		34	3	
Alemannia Aachen	2007–08	2. Bundesliga	33	5	2	0	—		35	3	
Alemannia Aachen	2008–09	2. Bundesliga	32	4	2	0	—		34	4	
Alemannia Aachen	Total		95	12	8	0	—		103	12	—
St. Pauli	2009–10	2. Bundesliga	33	8	2	0	—		35	8	
St. Pauli	2010–11	Bundesliga	33	5	1	0	—		34	5	
St. Pauli	Total		66	13	3	0	—		69	13	—
Eintracht Frankfurt	2011–12	2. Bundesliga	26	0	2	0	—		28	0	
Köln	2012–13	2. Bundesliga	27	0	2	0	—		29	0	
Köln	2013–14	2. Bundesliga	33	0	3	0	—		36	0	
Köln	2014–15	Bundesliga	32	5	3	1	—		35	6	
Köln	2015–16	Bundesliga	32	0	2	0	—		34	0	
Köln	2016–17	Bundesliga	32	0	2	0	—		34	0	
Köln	2017–18	Bundesliga	20	0	2	0	5	0	27	0	
Köln	2018–19	2. Bundesliga	4	0	0	0	0	0	4	0	
Köln	Total		180	5	16	1	5	0	183	6	—
Career total			524	53	35	2	5	0	564	55	—
