= Max Kruse =

German footballer (born 1988)

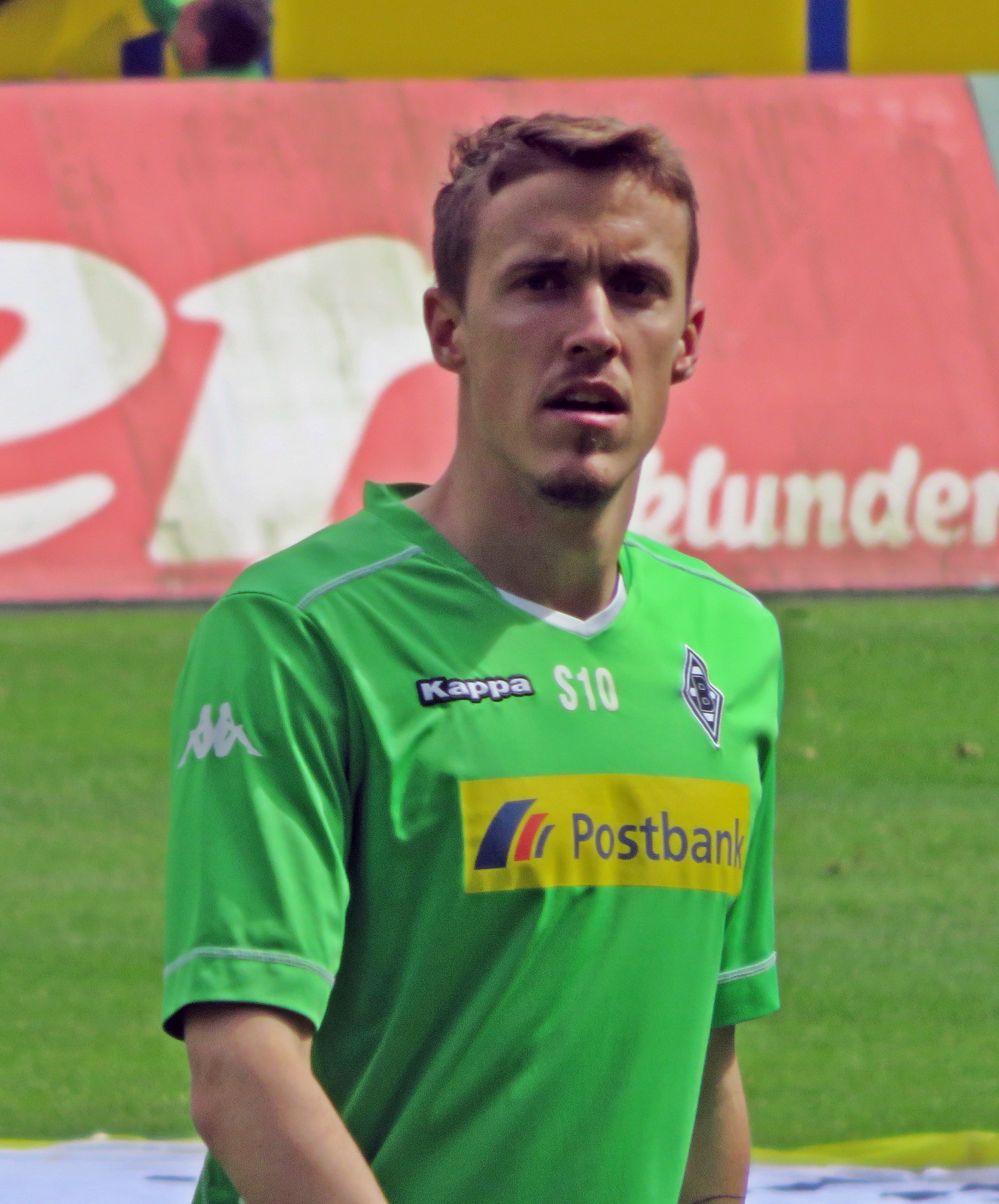
- Kruse with Borussia Mönchengladbach in 2015

Personal information
- Full name: Max Bennet Kruse
- Date of birth: 19 March 1988 (age 38)
- Place of birth: Reinbek, West Germany
- Height: 1.80 m (5 ft 11 in)
- Positions: Forward; attacking midfielder

Youth career
- 1992–1998: TSV Reinbek
- 1998–2005: SC Vier- und Marschlande
- 2006–2007: Werder Bremen

Senior career*
Years	Team	Apps	(Gls)
2006–2009	Werder Bremen II	69	(7)
2007–2009	Werder Bremen	1	(0)
2009–2012	FC St. Pauli	96	(22)
2009	FC St. Pauli II	1	(0)
2012–2013	SC Freiburg	34	(11)
2013–2015	Borussia Mönchengladbach	66	(23)
2015–2016	VfL Wolfsburg	32	(6)
2016–2019	Werder Bremen	84	(32)
2019–2020	Fenerbahçe	20	(7)
2020–2022	Union Berlin	38	(16)
2022	VfL Wolfsburg	19	(7)
2023	SC Paderborn	5	(0)
Total		465	(131)

International career
2006–2007	Germany U19	17	(6)
2007–2008	Germany U20	6	(1)
2008	Germany U21	1	(1)
2021	Germany Olympic	3	(0)
2013–2015	Germany	14	(4)
- * Club domestic league appearances and goals

Max Bennet Kruse (German pronunciation: [ˈmaks ˈkʁuːzə]; born 19 March 1988) is a German former professional footballer who played as a forward or attacking midfielder.

== Early years ==
Kruse was born in Reinbek, Kreis Stormarn, Schleswig-Holstein in the north-eastern periphery of Hamburg. He was raised in Reinbek or in Hamburg.

== Club career ==
=== Early career ===
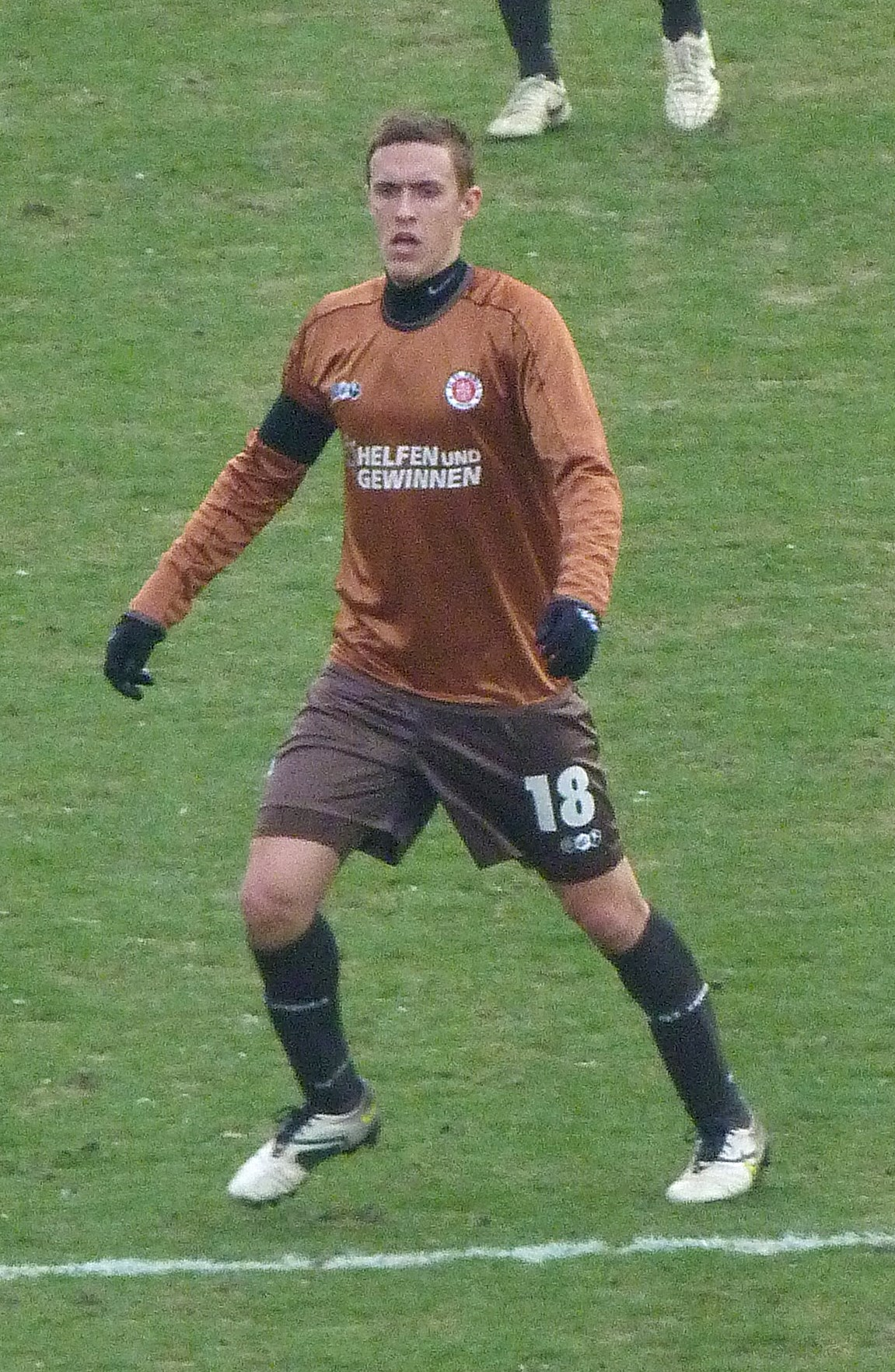
Kruse with St. Pauli in 2011

Kruse began his career with hometown club TSV Reinbek before he joined Hamburg-based SV Vier- und Marschlande in summer 1998. After more than seven years there, he was scouted by Werder Bremen in January 2006. On 4 May 2009, he signed a two-year contract with FC St. Pauli. During the 2011–12 2. Bundesliga, Kruse scored 13 goals and provided six assists as FC St. Pauli finished on 62 points in fourth place, missing out on the promotion playoffs on goal difference.

=== SC Freiburg ===
Following his successful spell with St. Pauli, Kruse was transferred to Bundesliga side SC Freiburg in the summer of 2012. He made his competitive debut for his new club on 18 August 2012 in a DFB-Pokal match against Victoria Hamburg, which ended in a 2–1 victory as Kruse scored the opening goal and provided the assist for Sebastian Freis's winner. Kruse made his home league debut on 25 August, scoring a goal in Freiburg's 1–1 draw with 1. FSV Mainz 05. He helped Freiburg claim their first win of the Bundesliga season in their third game on 16 September, netting a goal and providing two assists in an enthralling 5–3 defeat of TSG Hoffenheim.

Kruse helped seal an upset win over Schalke on 15 December, providing assists for first half goals to both Jan Rosenthal and Jonathan Schmid in a 3–1 away victory at the Arena AufSchalke. On 16 February, he opened the scoring nine minutes before half time as Freiburg recorded their first win over Kruse's former club Werder Bremen in 11 years with a 3–2 away victory at the Weserstadion.

Kruse scored twice in the second half of Freiburg's Bundesliga clash with Borussia Mönchengladbach on 30 March, securing a 2–0 victory for the club. In his penultimate game with Freiburg on 11 May, he was awarded "Man of the Match" honours as he scored the winning goal in a 2–1 defeat of already relegated Greuther Fürth, all but securing Freiburg an automatic spot in the Europa League group stage for next season.

=== Borussia Mönchengladbach ===
Following a standout season with Freiburg, Kruse signed for Borussia Mönchengladbach on a four-year deal in April 2013. He made his debut for the club in Gladbach's loss to 3. Liga side Darmstadt 98 in the first round of the DFB-Pokal on 4 August 2013. He managed to score his first goal for the club on 17 August, firing in Gladbach's first goal in a 3–0 home victory over Hannover 96. Kruse continued his scoring form on 31 August, netting Gladbach's third goal of a 4–1 home victory over his former club Werder Bremen.

=== Wolfsburg ===
On 10 May 2015, VfL Wolfsburg signed Kruse on a four-year deal, after activating his release clause of €12 million. He made his debut as a 70th-minute substitute on 1 August in the 2015 DFL-Supercup, and scored in the penalty shootout as Wolfsburg defeated Bayern Munich after a 1–1 draw. On 8 August 2015, Kruse scored his first goal for Wolfsburg in the fourth minute of 4–1 win at Stuttgarter Kickers in the first round of the DFB-Pokal.

=== Werder Bremen ===
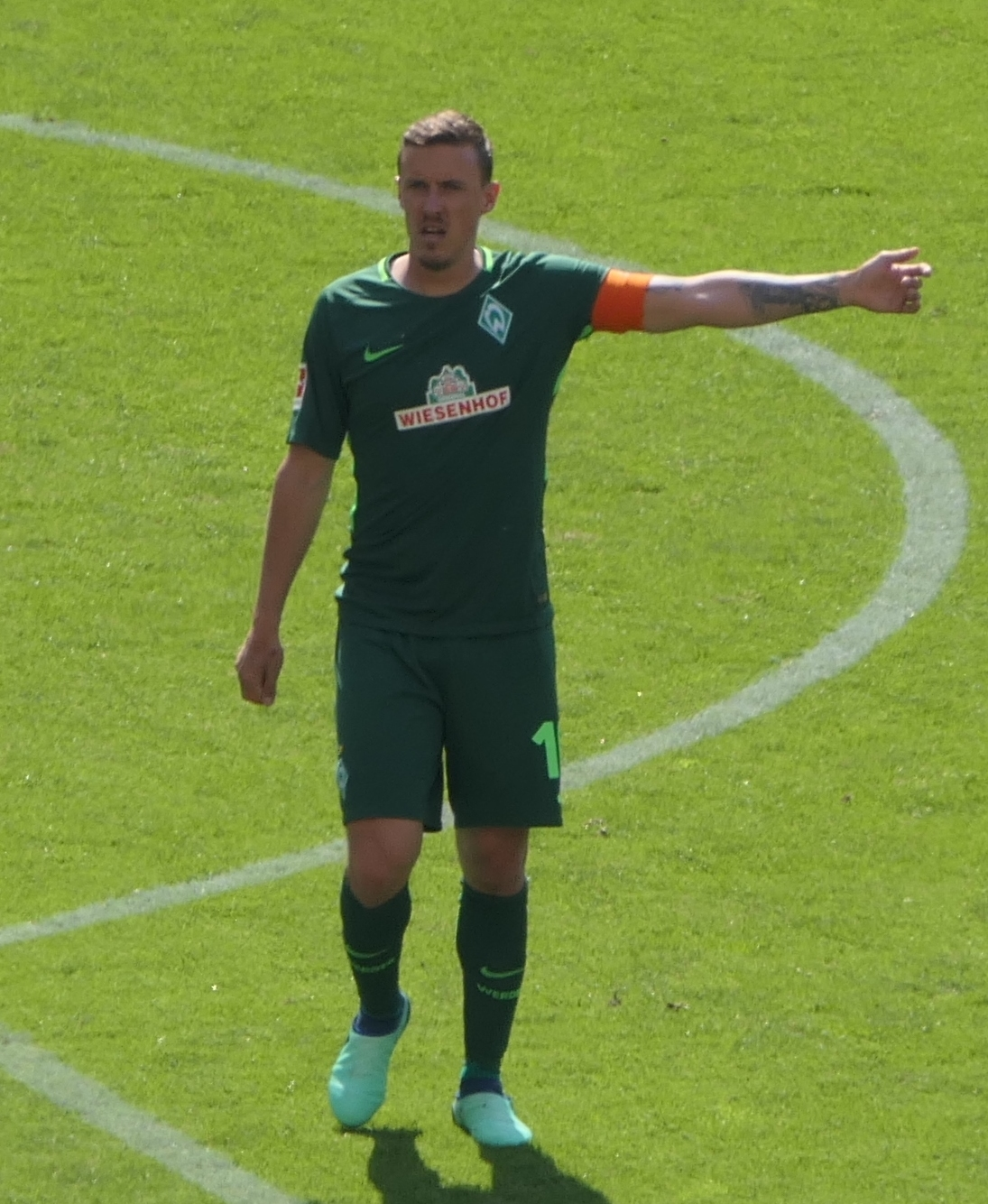
Kruse captaining Werder Bremen in 2018

On 2 August 2016, Kruse re-joined Werder Bremen for a second stint at the club. He scored his first goal for the club in his third league appearance on 3 December 2016, in a 2–1 win against Ingolstadt. On 22 April 2017, he scored four goals in one match for the first time in his career as Werder Bremen came back from 0–1 and 1–2 deficits to defeat Ingolstadt 4–2 and maintain a 10-match unbeaten run.

Ahead of the 2018–19 season, Kruse was chosen as the team's captain by manager Florian Kohfeldt.

As of October 2018, he was the player with the longest active penalty scoring streak – 24 goals. He had not missed a single penalty in six years. His streak started on 7 April 2012.

In May 2019, Kruse announced he would not extend his contract and leave the club following the 2018–19 season.

=== Fenerbahçe ===
On 28 June 2019, Kruse joined Fenerbahçe on a three-year deal. On 18 June 2020, he terminated his contract with the club citing unpaid wages.

=== Union Berlin ===
On 6 August 2020, Kruse returned to the Bundesliga joining Union Berlin. On 3 October, he scored his first goal for Union and the game's opener in a 4–0 win against Mainz 05. He then scored a penalty and assisted two goals in a 3–1 win against 1899 Hoffenheim on 3 November. During a 5–0 win against Arminia Bielefeld on 7 November 2020, he scored a penalty to equalise Hans-Joachim Abel's Bundesliga record for most penalties scored (16) without a single miss. On the last matchday of the season, he scored a goal in stoppage time to beat RB Leipzig 2–1 and qualify Union Berlin for the 2021–22 UEFA Europa Conference League, their first European football since the 2001–02 UEFA Cup.

=== Return to Wolfsburg ===
On 30 January 2022, Kruse re-joined VfL Wolfsburg on a one-and-a-half-year deal. On 28 November 2022, Wolfsburg and Kruse agreed to terminate his contract by mutual consent.

=== SC Paderborn ===
On 30 June 2023, Kruse agreed to join 2. Bundesliga club SC Paderborn. On 24 November 2023, his contract with SC Paderborn was mutually terminated.

A month later, Kruse announced his retirement from playing. In 375 matches in the top two divisions of the German league pyramid he scored 117 league goals.

== International career ==
=== Early international career ===
Kruse was a member of the Germany U-19 that competed at the 2007 UEFA U-19 Championship and also featured for the under-21 team.

Kruse received his first call-up to the Germany national team for a friendly match against Ecuador on 29 May 2013 in Boca Raton, Florida. He also debuted on said occasion with an assist for Lukas Podolski's second goal before being replaced by Dennis Aogo in the 79th minute; it ended in a 4–2 victory for the Germans. Kruse scored his first goal for the national team in his second cap, scoring Germany's second goal in a 4–3 defeat to the United States in Washington, D.C., on 2 June, a game which celebrated 100 years of the United States Soccer Federation. Despite Kruse's successful league campaign with Gladbach, he was omitted from the 30-man preliminary squad for the World Cup in Brazil.

On 13 June 2015, Kruse scored twice in a 7–0 victory in a UEFA Euro 2016 qualifying match against Gibraltar. In March 2016, Joachim Löw said that he would not consider Kruse for the national team anymore after the latter made negative headlines. Kruse earned 14 caps and four goals in total. During this time, he was a part of a collaboration between the German Football Association and The LEGO Group – which released a Europe-exclusive collectible minifigure series in 2016 – with Kruse featured as the sixteenth and final minifigure in the collection.

=== 2020 Summer Olympics ===
Having not represented Germany since 2015, Kruse was named as one of Germany's three overage players for the 2020 Tokyo Olympics. Kruse started in Germany's opening match against Brazil where the German team lost 4–2.

== Professional poker ==
Max Kruse

World Series of Poker
- Bracelet: 1
- Final tables: 4
- Money finishes: 15

Kruse is an avid poker player and made it to the final table, finishing third, at the No-Limit 2–7 Draw Lowball event at the 2014 World Series of Poker on 18 June 2014, taking home $36,494 in prize money. In March 2016, Kruse was fined €25,000 and warned of his future conduct by Wolfsburg after it was revealed that he had lost €75,000 worth of poker winnings in the back seat of a taxi. This incident also caused him to be dropped from the Germany squad. In November 2022, at the World Series of Poker Europe in Rozvadov, Czechia, Kruse won his first WSOP bracelet in a €1,650 No Limit Hold 'em event besting 412 entrants for a prize of €134,152. As of the start of the 2024 WSOP, Kruse has won almost $367,000 in all poker tournaments.

== Personal life ==
In February 2021, Kruse was one of more than 800 professional footballers, across both the men's and women's game, who signed a petition in German football magazine 11 Freunde to support gay players.

He has a son with his first partner Alina. In July 2021, he proposed to his wife Dilara Mardine of Kurdish origin on live TV after a 3–2 win against Saudi Arabia during the 2020 Summer Olympics. The couple married in December later that year.

== Career statistics ==
=== Club ===
Appearances and goals by club, season and competition
Club	Season	League			National cup (Note: Includes DFB-Pokal, Turkish Cup)		Europe		Other		Total	
Club	Season	Division	Apps	Goals	Apps	Goals	Apps	Goals	Apps	Goals	Apps	Goals
Werder Bremen II	2006–07	Regionalliga Nord	12	0	—		—		—		12	0
Werder Bremen II	2007–08	Regionalliga Nord	33	2	3	0	—		—		33	2
Werder Bremen II	2008–09	3. Liga	24	5	—		—		—		24	5
Werder Bremen II	Total		69	7	3	0	—		—		72	7
Werder Bremen	2007–08	Bundesliga	1	0	0	0	0	0	—		1	0
FC St. Pauli II	2009–10	Regionalliga Nord	1	0	—		—		—		1	0
FC St. Pauli	2009–10	2. Bundesliga	29	7	2	0	—		—		31	7
FC St. Pauli	2010–11	Bundesliga	33	2	1	0	—		—		34	2
FC St. Pauli	2011–12	2. Bundesliga	34	13	1	0	—		—		35	13
FC St. Pauli	Total		96	22	4	0	—		—		100	22
SC Freiburg	2012–13	Bundesliga	34	11	5	1	—		—		39	12
Borussia Mönchengladbach	2013–14	Bundesliga	34	12	1	0	—		—		35	12
Borussia Mönchengladbach	2014–15	Bundesliga	32	11	3	2	7 (Note: Appearances in UEFA Europa League)	0	—		42	13
Borussia Mönchengladbach	Total		66	23	4	2	7	0	—		77	25
VfL Wolfsburg	2015–16	Bundesliga	32	6	1	1	9 (Note: Appearances in UEFA Champions League)	2	1 (Note: Appearance in DFL-Supercup)	0	43	9
Werder Bremen	2016–17	Bundesliga	23	15	1	0	—		—		24	15
Werder Bremen	2017–18	Bundesliga	29	6	4	2	—		—		33	8
Werder Bremen	2018–19	Bundesliga	32	11	4	1	—		—		36	12
Werder Bremen	Total		84	32	9	3	—		—		92	35
Fenerbahçe	2019–20	Süper Lig	20	7	3	0	—		—		23	7
Union Berlin	2020–21	Bundesliga	22	11	0	0	—		—		22	11
Union Berlin	2021–22	Bundesliga	16	5	2	1	5 (Note: Appearances in UEFA Europa Conference League)	2	—		23	8
Union Berlin	Total		38	16	2	1	5	2	—		45	19
VfL Wolfsburg	2021–22	Bundesliga	14	7	—		—		—		14	7
VfL Wolfsburg	2022–23	Bundesliga	5	0	0	0	—		—		5	0
VfL Wolfsburg	Total		19	7	0	0	—		—		19	7
SC Paderborn	2023–24	2. Bundesliga	5	0	0	0	—		—		5	0
Career total			465	131	31	8	21	4	1	0	518	143

=== International ===
Appearances and goals by national team and year
National team	Year	Apps	Goals
Germany	2013	6	1
Germany	2014	4	0
Germany	2015	4	3
Total		14	4

Scores and results list Germany's goal tally first, score column indicates score after each Kruse goal.

List of international goals scored by Max Kruse
No.	Date	Venue	Opponent	Score	Result	Competition
1	2 June 2013	Robert F. Kennedy Memorial Stadium, Washington, D.C., United States	United States	2–4	3–4	Friendly
2	13 June 2015	Estádio Algarve, Loulé, Portugal	Gibraltar	2–0	7–0	UEFA Euro 2016 qualifying
3	13 June 2015	Estádio Algarve, Loulé, Portugal	Gibraltar	7–0	7–0	UEFA Euro 2016 qualifying
4	11 October 2015	Red Bull Arena, Leipzig, Germany	Georgia	2–1	2–1	UEFA Euro 2016 qualifying

== Honours ==
VfL Wolfsburg

- DFL-Supercup: 2015

Individual

- VDV Newcomer of the Season: 2012–13
