= Paweł Olkowski =

Polish footballer (born 1990)

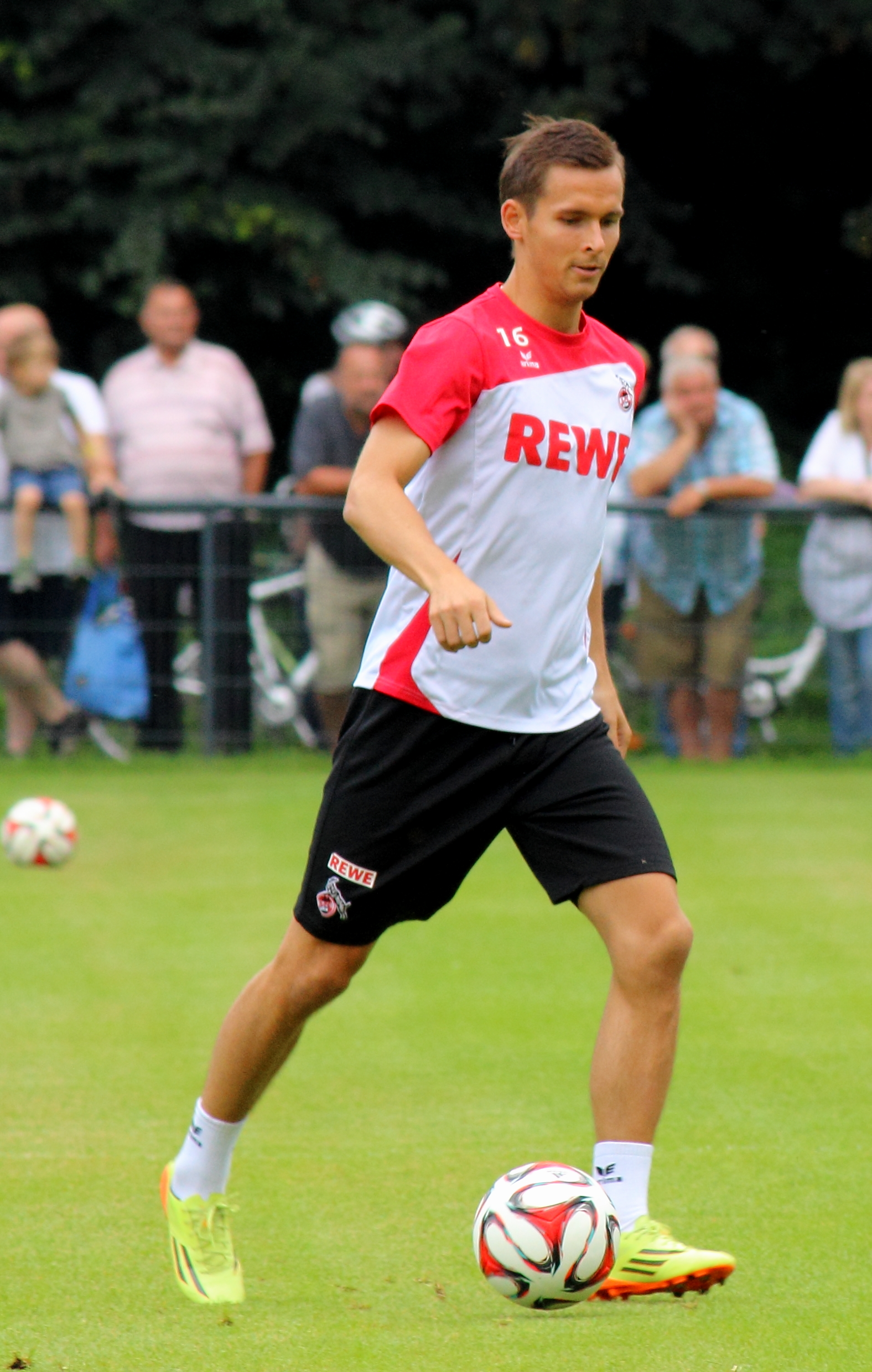
- Olkowski in 2014 with 1. FC Köln

Personal information
- Full name: Paweł Mirosław Olkowski
- Date of birth: 13 February 1990 (age 36)
- Place of birth: Ozimek, Poland
- Height: 1.84 m (6 ft 0 in)
- Position: Right-back

Team information
- Current team: GKS Tychy
- Number: 16

Youth career
- –2006: Małapanew Ozimek
- 2006–2009: Gwarek Zabrze
- 2009–2010: → Zagłębie Lubin (loan)

Senior career*
Years	Team	Apps	(Gls)
2009–2011	Gwarek Zabrze		
2010–2011	→ GKS Katowice (loan)	31	(5)
2011–2014	Górnik Zabrze	88	(3)
2014–2018	1. FC Köln	65	(2)
2018–2019	Bolton Wanderers	37	(2)
2019–2022	Gaziantep	42	(0)
2022–2026	Górnik Zabrze	95	(3)
2026–	GKS Tychy	0	(0)

International career
2008	Poland U19		
2011–2012	Poland U21	8	(0)
2013–2015	Poland	13	(0)
- * Club domestic league appearances and goals as of 19:26, 29 May 2026 (UTC)

Paweł Mirosław Olkowski (born 13 February 1990) is a Polish professional footballer who plays as a right-back for II liga club GKS Tychy. Besides Poland, he has played in Germany, England, and Turkey.

== Club career ==
Born in Ozimek, Olkowski started his senior career at Gwarek Zabrze. In July 2010, he was loaned to GKS Katowice on a one-year deal.

In July 2011, he joined Górnik Zabrze on a three-year contract.

On 1 July 2014, Olkowski joined German club 1. FC Köln on a free transfer.

On 10 July 2018, he joined Football League Championship side Bolton Wanderers on a two-year contract. He made his debut for Bolton on 4 August 2018 when starting Wanderers 2–1 victory over West Bromwich Albion at The Hawthorns. He also started the 2–2 draw against Bristol City, grabbing an assist in a positive performance.

On 9 July 2019, Olkowski joined Turkish club Gazişehir Gaziantep.

On 27 May 2022, it was announced he would return to Górnik Zabrze, signing a two-year contract with an extension option.

Four years later, on 27 May 2026, Olkowski signed a one-year deal with II liga side GKS Tychy.

== International career ==
Olkowski has represented Poland at under-19 and under-21 levels.

On 15 November 2013, he made his senior debut for the Poland national team in a friendly, starting in a 2–0 loss against Slovakia.

== Career statistics ==
=== Club ===
As of match played 23 May 2026

Appearances and goals by club, season and competition
Club	Season	League			National cup (Note: Includes Polish Cup, DFB-Pokal, FA Cup, Turkish Cup)		League cup		Other		Total	
Club	Season	Division	Apps	Goals	Apps	Goals	Apps	Goals	Apps	Goals	Apps	Goals
GKS Katowice	2010–11	I liga	31	5	0	0	—		0	0	31	5
Górnik Zabrze	2011–12	Ekstraklasa	29	0	2	0	—		0	0	31	0
Górnik Zabrze	2012–13	Ekstraklasa	29	0	1	0	—		0	0	30	0
Górnik Zabrze	2013–14	Ekstraklasa	30	3	3	0	—		0	0	33	3
Górnik Zabrze	Total		88	3	6	0	0	0	0	0	94	3
1. FC Köln	2014–15	Bundesliga	27	2	3	0	—		0	0	30	2
1. FC Köln	2015–16	Bundesliga	19	0	1	0	—		0	0	20	0
1. FC Köln	2016–17	Bundesliga	14	0	2	0	—		0	0	16	0
1. FC Köln	2017–18	Bundesliga	5	0	1	0	—		5 (Note: Appearances in UEFA Europa League)	0	11	0
1. FC Köln	Total		65	2	7	0	0	0	5	0	77	2
1. FC Köln II	2015–16	Regionalliga West	1	0	0	0	—		0	0	1	0
1. FC Köln II	2016–17	Regionalliga West	3	0	0	0	—		0	0	3	0
1. FC Köln II	Total		4	0	0	0	0	0	0	0	4	0
Bolton Wanderers	2018–19	Championship	37	2	2	0	0	0	0	0	39	2
Gaziantep	2019–20	Süper Lig	9	0	4	0	—		0	0	13	0
Gaziantep	2020–21	Süper Lig	31	0	2	0	—		0	0	33	0
Gaziantep	2021–22	Süper Lig	2	0	2	0	—		0	0	4	0
Gaziantep	Total		42	0	8	0	0	0	0	0	50	0
Górnik Zabrze	2022–23	Ekstraklasa	26	1	2	0	—		—		28	1
Górnik Zabrze	2023–24	Ekstraklasa	23	1	3	1	—		—		26	2
Górnik Zabrze	2024–25	Ekstraklasa	21	1	1	0	—		—		22	1
Górnik Zabrze	2025–26	Ekstraklasa	25	0	5	0	—		—		30	0
Górnik Zabrze	Total		95	3	11	1	0	0	0	0	106	4
GKS Tychy	2026–27	II liga	0	0	0	0	—		—		0	0
Career total			362	15	34	1	0	0	5	0	401	16

=== International ===
Appearances and goals by national team and year
National team	Year	Apps	Goals
Poland
Poland	2013	2	0
Poland	2014	6	0
Poland	2015	5	0
Total		13	0

== Honours ==
Górnik Zabrze

- Polish Cup: 2025–26
