= Charles Takyi =

Ghanaian footballer (born 1984)

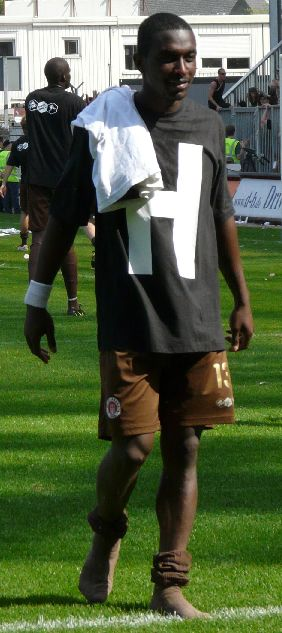
- Takyi during practice with St. Pauli in 2008

Personal information
- Full name: Charles Kwame Takyi
- Date of birth: 12 November 1984 (age 41)
- Place of birth: Accra, Greater Accra, Ghana
- Height: 1.76 m (5 ft 9 in)
- Position: Midfielder

Youth career
- 1992–1999: Tennis Borussia Berlin
- 1999–2003: Schalke 04

Senior career*
Years	Team	Apps	(Gls)
2003–2004	Schalke 04 II	20	(3)
2004–2006	Hamburger SV II	54	(1)
2005–2006	Hamburger SV	1	(0)
2006–2008	FC St. Pauli	57	(13)
2008–2009	Greuther Fürth	29	(3)
2009–2012	FC St. Pauli	59	(12)
2013	AC Horsens	11	(2)
2013–2014	Energie Cottbus	21	(2)
2014	Dibba Al-Fujairah Club	0	(0)
2015–2016	BFC Viktoria 1889	6	(0)
2016–2018	KFC Uerdingen 05	8	(0)
Total		266	(36)

International career
1998–1999	Germany U15	5	(0)
1999–2000	Germany U16	7	(2)
2000–2001	Germany U17	2	(1)
2001	Germany U18	1	(0)
2011–2012	Ghana	3	(0)
- * Club domestic league appearances and goals

Charles Kwame Takyi (born 12 November 1984) is a Ghanaian former professional footballer who played as a midfielder.

== Club career ==
=== Early career ===
Born in Accra, Ghana, Takyi moved to Berlin with his parents when he was five years old. He started playing for Tennis Borussia Berlin and joined the FC Schalke 04 youth setup when he was 15 years old.

=== Schalke 04 ===
Takyis first senior season was with FC Schalke 04 II, the reserve team of FC Schalke 04, in 2003. Although making 21 appearances for the team and scoring three goals, Takyi never managed to get into the professional squad. After one year at Schalke, he left the Gelsenkirchen team and joined Hamburger SV.

=== Hamburger SV ===
Like in Schalke, Takyi was a member of Hamburgs second team, known as Hamburger SV II. He became a key member in his first season with the team, appearing in 28 of 36 possible games, 27 times as a starter. For the 2005–06 season, he was promoted to the senior besides playing for HSV II. He made his Bundesliga debut on 10 December 2005 against Hertha BSC Berlin, coming in as a substitute for Guy Demel in the 71st minute. It was the only league game Takyi made during his time at Hamburg. With HSV II, he finished in 13th place at the end of the 2005–06 season avoiding relegation with the club.

=== AC Horsens ===
After six months without a contract, Takyi joined Danish Superliga side AC Horsens. He signed a six-month contract with the Danish side. He made his Superliga debut on 3 March 2013 against Nordsjælland, receiving a yellow card in the 38th minute of a 1–0 defeat.

=== Retirement ===
In November 2018, it was reported Takyi had retired as a player.

== International career ==
While playing for Germany at youth levels, Takyi expressed his favor to play for his birth country. The Ghana Football Association applied to FIFA for a nationality switch of Takyi in November 2011. In October 2011, it was reported that Takyi was giving permission to play for Ghana. He was first called up for the national team in November 2011 for the friendlies against Gabon and Sierra Leone. Takyi made his debut for the Black Stars in the friendly against Gabon on 14 November 2011.

Takyi was included in the Ghana national team's 23 man squad for the 2012 Africa Cup of Nations in January 2012 and he made his tournament debut, coming on as a substitute for Sulley Muntari in the 2012 Africa Cup of Nations Group D match against Mali on 28 January 2012.

== Honours ==
Hamburger SV

- Bundesliga third place: 2005–06
