= Andreas Biermann =

German footballer

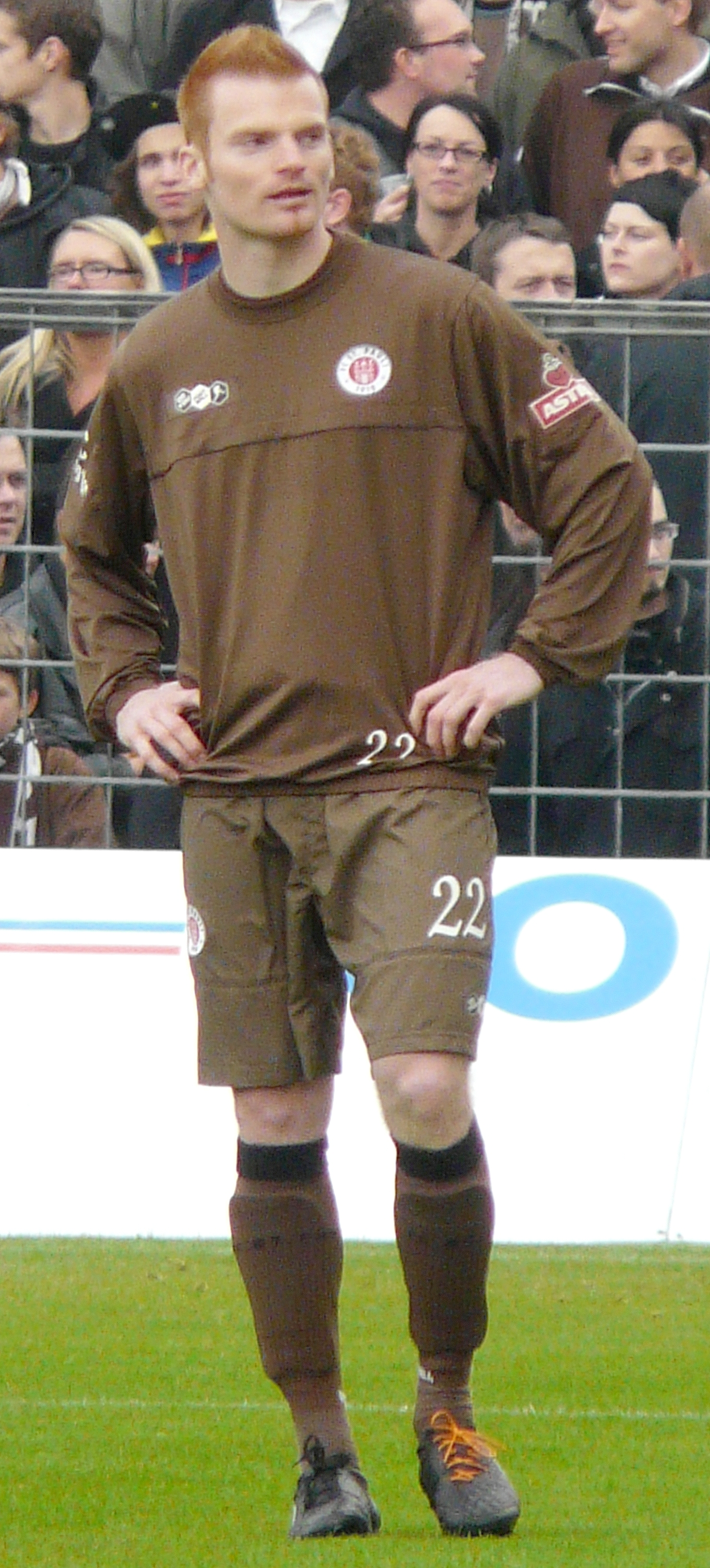
- Biermann in FC St. Pauli colours

Personal information
- Full name: Andreas Biermann
- Date of birth: 13 September 1980
- Place of birth: West Berlin, West Germany
- Date of death: 18 July 2014 (aged 33)
- Place of death: Berlin, Germany
- Height: 1.84 m (6 ft 0 in)
- Position: Defender

Youth career
- –1997: SC Schwarz-Weiß Spandau
- 1997–1998: Hertha BSC Berlin

Senior career*
Years	Team	Apps	(Gls)
1999–2000	Hertha BSC Berlin II	35	(2)
2000–2001	1. SC Göttingen 05	18	(1)
2002–2004	Chemnitzer FC	39	(1)
2005–2006	MSV Neuruppin	45	(8)
2006–2007	Union Berlin	29	(2)
2007	Tennis Borussia Berlin	7	(1)
2008–2010	FC St. Pauli II	23	(0)
2008–2010	FC St. Pauli	10	(0)
2012–2013	FC Spandau 06		
2013–2014	FSV Spandauer Kickers		
- * Club domestic league appearances and goals

Andreas Biermann (13 September 1980 – 18 July 2014) was a German professional footballer who played as a defender.

== Career ==
Biermann made his debut on the professional league level in the 2. Bundesliga for FC St. Pauli on 10 March 2008 when he started in a game against 1860 Munich.

== Background ==
On 19 November 2009, a few days after Robert Enke had committed suicide, he announced that he suffered from depression and had attempted suicide in October. He received inpatient treatment but committed suicide on 18 July 2014.
