= Florian Bruns =

German footballer (born 1979)

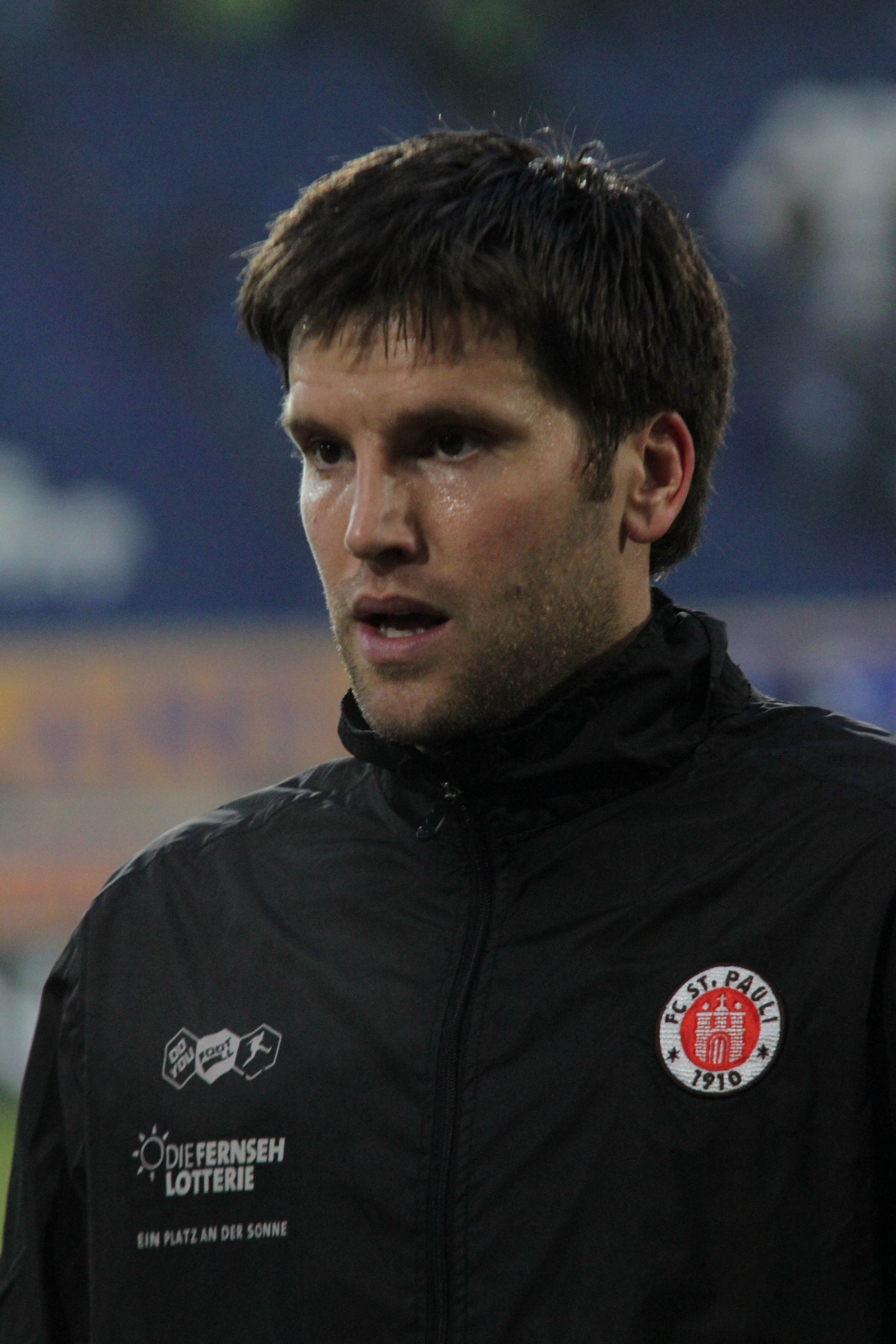
- Bruns with St. Pauli in 2012

Personal information
- Date of birth: 21 August 1979 (age 47)
- Place of birth: Oldenburg, West Germany
- Height: 1.87 m (6 ft 2 in)
- Position: Midfielder

Team information
- Current team: SC Freiburg (assistant coach)

Youth career
- TuS Bloherfelde
- VfL Edewecht
- FC Rastede
- –1996: VfL Bad Zwischenahn
- 1996–1999: VfB Oldenburg

Senior career*
Years	Team	Apps	(Gls)
1999–2002	SC Freiburg	44	(2)
2003–2004	Union Berlin	43	(4)
2004–2006	Alemannia Aachen	27	(4)
2006–2013	FC St. Pauli	201	(25)
2013–2015	Werder Bremen II	54	(13)
Total		369	(48)

International career
1999–2001	Germany U21	13	(4)

Managerial career
- 2015–2016: Werder Bremen II (assistant coach)
- 2016–2017: Werder Bremen (assistant coach)
- 2017–: SC Freiburg (assistant coach)
- * Club domestic league appearances and goals

Florian Bruns (born 21 August 1979) is a German football coach and former player who played as a midfielder. He was the assistant coach of Werder Bremen II and was promoted to interim assistant coach of the professional team of SV Werder Bremen on 12 March 2016. After leaving this post in summer 2017, he joined SC Freiburg in the role of assistant coach.
