= Patrik Borger =

German footballer and coach

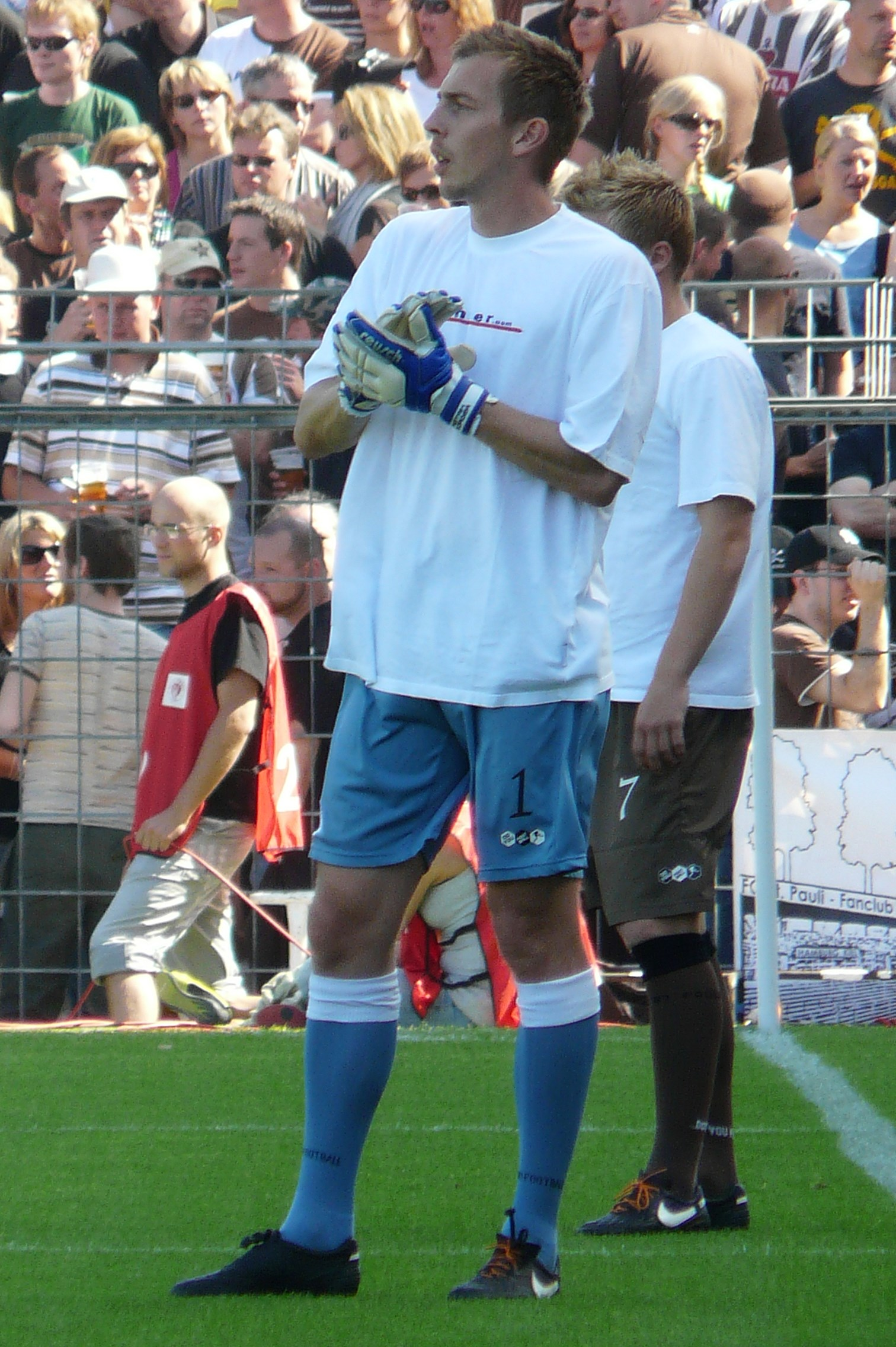
- Borger in 2008

Personal information
- Date of birth: 19 January 1979 (age 47)
- Place of birth: Rendsburg, West Germany
- Height: 1.97 m (6 ft 6 in)
- Position: Goalkeeper

Youth career
- Fortuna Stampe
- TSV Kronshagen
- Suchsdorfer SV

Senior career*
Years	Team	Apps	(Gls)
2000–2003	TSV Altenholz	78	(1)
2003–2005	VfR Neumünster	21	(0)
2005–2010	FC St. Pauli II	58	(0)
2006–2010	FC St. Pauli	52	(0)
Total		209	(1)

Managerial career
- 2015–: Holstein Kiel (goalkeeper coach)
- * Club domestic league appearances and goals

Patrik Borger (born 19 January 1979) is a German football coach and former player. who is the goalkeeper coach of Bundesliga club Holstein Kiel.

== Career ==
Borger was born in Rendsburg. He made his debut on the professional league level in the 2. Bundesliga for FC St. Pauli on 10 August 2007 when he started in a game against 1. FC Köln.
