= Dominic Maroh =

Slovenian footballer (born 1987)

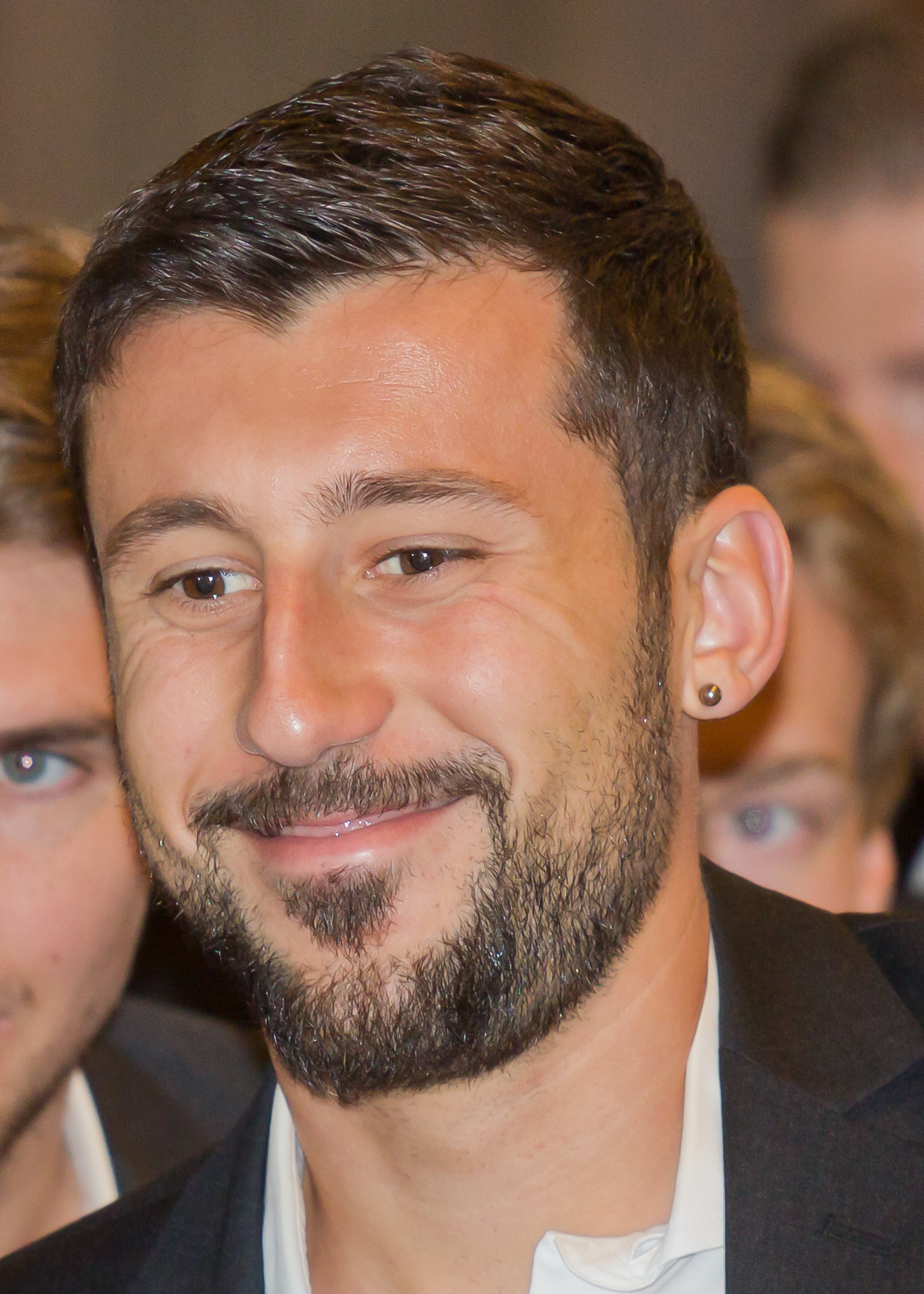
- Maroh in 2014

Personal information
- Date of birth: 4 March 1987 (age 39)
- Place of birth: Nürtingen, West Germany
- Height: 1.86 m (6 ft 1 in)
- Position: Defender

Team information
- Current team: VfB Stuttgart (U16 assistant coach)

Youth career
- –2000: TSV Neckartailfingen
- 2000–2006: SSV Reutlingen

Senior career*
Years	Team	Apps	(Gls)
2006–2008	SSV Reutlingen	13	(1)
2008–2012	1. FC Nürnberg	76	(3)
2008–2011	→ 1. FC Nürnberg II	10	(1)
2012–2018	1. FC Köln	142	(5)
2015–2016	→ 1. FC Köln II	2	(0)
2018–2021	KFC Uerdingen 05	42	(1)

International career
2012–2015	Slovenia	7	(0)

Managerial career
- 2021–: VfB Stuttgart (U16 assistant)
- * Club domestic league appearances and goals

Dominic Maroh (born 4 March 1987) is a Slovenian professional football coach and a former defender. He is an assistant coach for the Under-16 squad of German club VfB Stuttgart.

== Club career ==
Maroh began his career at TSV Neckartailfingen, played there until moving to the youth team of SSV Reutlingen in 2000. He was promoted to first team in 2006. On 21 June 2008, he moved to 1. FC Nürnberg II in the Regionalliga Süd. His first professional game was on 7 November 2008 against FSV Frankfurt. Maroh scored his first goal in the game against SpVgg Greuther Fürth, on 23 November 2008.

Maroh joined recently relegated 1. FC Köln on 8 June 2012, agreeing a two-year deal with the club.

On 28 April 2018, he played as Köln lost 3–2 to SC Freiburg which confirmed Köln’s relegation from the Bundesliga.

== International career ==
As a son of a Slovenian father he was eligible to play for Slovenia and made public statements of his willingness to play for Slovenia. In February 2009, he was first called up to Slovenia team for matches against Belgium. However, he later turned down the offer and decided in favour of Germany.

In 2012, he was again called to play for c by coach Slaviša Stojanovič for a friendly match against Romania. He made his debut for Slovenia on 15 August against Romania replacing Marko Šuler in the 90th minute. He was capped 7 times.
