= Sven Müller (footballer, born 1996) =

German footballer

Personal information
- Full name: Sven Tobias Müller
- Date of birth: 16 February 1996 (age 30)
- Place of birth: Cologne, Germany
- Height: 1.90 m (6 ft 3 in)
- Position: Goalkeeper

Team information
- Current team: Hallescher FC
- Number: 1

Youth career
- –2004: SC West Köln
- 2004–2015: 1. FC Köln

Senior career*
Years	Team	Apps	(Gls)
2014–2018	1. FC Köln II	54	(0)
2015–2018	1. FC Köln	1	(0)
2018–2020	Karlsruher SC	2	(0)
2020–2022	Hallescher FC	32	(0)
2022–2023	Dynamo Dresden	4	(0)
2023–	Hallescher FC	61	(0)

International career
2010	Germany U15	1	(0)
- * Club domestic league appearances and goals as of 22 June 2026

Sven Tobias Müller (born 16 February 1996) is a German professional footballer who plays as a goalkeeper for the club Hallescher FC.

== Club career ==
=== 1. FC Köln ===
After signing from SC West Köln in 2004, Müller progressed through 1. FC Köln's youth system, eventually reached the club's second team in 2014. Müller made 13 appearances for the second team through 2016, before moving up to the first team squad for the 2016–17 season. He earned the third spot on the depth chart at goalkeeper, behind Timo Horn and Thomas Kessler, when previous number three Daniel Mesenhöler was transferred away to Union Berlin. Manager Peter Stöger described him as a "young, talented goalkeeper, but already pretty hard-nosed".

On 20 August 2016, Müller was thrust into action, making his first team debut in the DFB-Pokal facing sixth-tier BFC Preussen, with Horn away on national Olympic duty and Kessler out with a torn knee ligament sustained in preseason training. Müller got the chance to make his Bundesliga debut shortly thereafter, facing VfL Wolfsburg at the Volkswagen Arena on 10 September 2016, earning the start after Horn sustained an injury to his hip. Müller came through with a four-save clean sheet to give Köln a goalless draw.

=== Hallescher FC ===
In September 2020, Müller joined Hallescher FC from Karlsruher SC.

== Career statistics ==
As of matches played 31 May 2025.

Appearances and goals by club, season and competition
Club	Season	League			Cup		Total	
Club	Season	Division	Apps	Goals	Apps	Goals	Apps	Goals
1. FC Köln II	2013–14	Regionalliga West	1	0	—		1	0
1. FC Köln II	2014–15	Regionalliga West	1	0	—		1	0
1. FC Köln II	2015–16	Regionalliga West	11	0	—		11	0
1. FC Köln II	2016–17	Regionalliga West	14	0	—		14	0
1. FC Köln II	2017–18	Regionalliga West	27	0	—		27	0
1. FC Köln II	Total		54	0	—		54	0
1. FC Köln	2016–17	Bundesliga	1	0	1	0	2	0
1. FC Köln	2017–18	Bundesliga	0	0	0	0	0	0
1. FC Köln	Total		1	0	1	0	2	0
Karlsruher SC	2018–19	3. Liga	2	0	0	0	2	0
Hallescher FC	2020–21	3. Liga	25	0	—		25	0
Hallescher FC	2021–22	3. Liga	7	0	—		7	0
Hallescher FC	Total		32	0	—		32	0
Dynamo Dresden	2022–23	3. Liga	4	0	1	0	5	0
Hallescher FC	2023–24	3. Liga	18	0	1	0	19	0
Hallescher FC	2024–25	Regionalliga Nordost	11	0	1	0	12	0
Hallescher FC	Total		29	0	2	0	31	0
Career total			122	0	4	0	126	0
