= 2016 HappyBet Cup =

Tournament details
- Host country: Germany
- Dates: 24 July
- Teams: 4 (from 1 confederation)
- Venue: 1 (in 1 host city)

Final positions
- Champions: (Germany) Alemannia Aachen
- Runners-up: (Spain) Málaga CF
- Third place: (Germany) 1. FC Köln
- Fourth place: (France) Olympique de Marseille

Tournament statistics
- Matches played: 4

The 2016 HappyBet Cup was a summer football friendly tournament organized by Alemannia Aachen, La Liga and Match IQ. It was hosted on 24 July 2016 by Alemannia Aachen at the New Tivoli in Aachen. Köln (Germany), Málaga (Spain) and Marseille (France) participated in the tournament along with the hosts, Alemannia. It was sponsored by HappyBet.

== Overview ==
=== Participants ===
Nation	Team	Location	Confederation	League
Germany	Alemannia Aachen	Aachen	UEFA	Regionalliga West (IV)
Germany	1. FC Köln	Cologne	UEFA	Bundesliga
Spain	Málaga	Málaga	UEFA	La Liga
France	Marseille	Marseille	UEFA	Ligue 1

=== Standings ===
All matches will last for just 45 minutes. If a match is level after normal time then a penalty shoot-out will decide who advances.

Bracket

Semi-finals
24 July 2016
(Germany) 1. FC Köln	0
(Spain) Málaga	1
24 July 2016
(Germany) Alemannia Aachen	0 (4)
(France) Marseille	0 (2)

Final
24 July 2016
(Spain) Málaga	0 (3)
(Germany) Alemannia Aachen	0 (4)
Third place play-off
24 July 2016
(Germany) 1. FC Köln	2
(France) Marseille	1

=== Matches ===
All matches lasted 45 minutes.

Semi-finals

24 July 2016
14:00 CEST

1. FC Köln (Germany)	0–1	(Spain) Málaga
	Report	Fornals 19'

Tivoli, Aachen
Referee: Mitja Stegemann (Germany)

24 July 2016
15:00 CEST

Alemannia Aachen (Germany)	0–0	(France) Marseille
	Report
Penalties
Propheter (penalty scored); Fejzullahu (penalty scored); Winter (penalty missed); Löhden (penalty scored); Staffeldt (penalty scored)	4–2	(penalty scored) Sarr; (penalty missed) Alessandrini; (penalty scored) Lopez; (penalty missed) Tuiloma

Tivoli, Aachen

Third place play-off

24 July 2016
16:00 CEST

1. FC Köln (Germany)	2–1	(France) Marseille
Rudņevs 20'; Bittencourt 31'	Report	Rolando 23'

Tivoli, Aachen

Final

24 July 2016
17:00 CEST

Málaga (Spain)	0–0	(Germany) Alemannia Aachen
	Report
Penalties
Santos (penalty scored); Recio (penalty scored); Castro (penalty scored); Jony (penalty missed); Camacho (penalty missed)	3–4	(penalty scored) Propheter; (penalty missed) Hammel; (penalty scored) Kucharzik; (penalty scored) Dowidat; (penalty scored) Mohr

Tivoli, Aachen
Referee: Mario Heller (Germany)
