= Sven Müller =

Sven Müller may refer to:

- Sven Müller (footballer, born 1980), German footballer
- Sven Müller (racing driver) (born 1992), German racing driver
- Sven Müller (footballer, born 1996), German footballer
