= 2016–17 1. FC Köln season =

1. FC Köln
2016–17 season
- Chairman: Werner Spinner
- Manager: Peter Stöger
- Stadium: RheinEnergieSTADION
- Bundesliga: 5th
- DFB-Pokal: Round of 16
- Top goalscorer: League: Anthony Modeste (25 goals); All: Anthony Modeste (27 goals)
- Highest home attendance: 50,000
- Lowest home attendance: 43,000
- Average home league attendance: 49,571
- Biggest win: Preussen 0–7 Köln
- Biggest defeat: Hoffenheim 4–0 Köln
Home colours	Away colours	Third colours
- All statistics correct as of 27 May 2017.

2016–17 1. FC Köln season is the 2016–17 for the German football club.

== Background ==
Carnival special

1. FC Köln finished the 2015–16 Bundesliga season in 9th place, thus ensuring a place in the 2016–17 Bundesliga. The 2016–17 season is the 46th season for the club in the Bundesliga and the third season in their current spell. The percentage of possible seasons in the Bundesliga amounts to 85.18% for the club. At the start of the season the club was in 14th place in the German TV money table.

== Review ==
=== July–August ===
The preparations for the 2016/17 season began on 4 July 4, 2016. From 10 July till 15 July 2016 the squad was in a training camp in Bad Tatzmannsdorf. From 29 July till 5 August 2016 there was another training camp in Kitzbühel.

== Players ==
=== Squad ===
Note: Flags indicate national team as defined under FIFA eligibility rules; some limited exceptions apply. Players may hold more than one non-FIFA nationality.

No.	Pos.	Nation	Player
1	GK	GER	Timo Horn
2	DF	SRB	Neven Subotić (on loan from Borussia Dortmund)
3	DF	GER	Dominique Heintz
4	DF	DEN	Frederik Sørensen
5	DF	SVN	Dominic Maroh
6	MF	GER	Marco Höger
7	MF	GER	Marcel Risse
8	MF	SRB	Miloš Jojić
9	FW	LVA	Artjoms Rudņevs
11	FW	GER	Simon Zoller
13	FW	JPN	Yuya Osako
14	DF	GER	Jonas Hector (Vice-captain)

No.	Pos.	Nation	Player
16	DF	POL	Paweł Olkowski
17	FW	GER	Christian Clemens
18	GK	GER	Thomas Kessler
19	FW	FRA	Serhou Guirassy
20	MF	GER	Salih Özcan
21	MF	GER	Leonardo Bittencourt
24	DF	GER	Lukas Klünter
27	FW	FRA	Anthony Modeste
30	MF	GER	Marcel Hartel
33	MF	GER	Matthias Lehmann (Captain)
34	DF	GER	Konstantin Rausch
35	GK	GER	Sven Müller

=== Transfers ===
==== In ====
No.	Pos.	Nat.	Name	Age	EU	Moving from	Type	Transfer window	Ends	Transfer fee	Source
6	MF	(Germany)	Marco Höger	26	EU	Schalke 04	Transfer	Summer	2021	undisclosed	
34	MF	(Germany)	Konstantin Rausch	26	EU	Darmstadt 98	Recruit	Summer	2019	none	
9	FW	(Latvia)	Artjoms Rudņevs	28	EU	Hamburger SV	Transfer	Summer	2019	none	
19	FW	(France)	Serhou Guirassy	20	EU	Lille	Transfer	Summer	2021	undisclosed	
30	MF	(Germany)	Marcel Hartel	20	EU	1. FC Köln	Youth	Summer	2019	none	
35	GK	(Germany)	Sven Müller	20	EU	1. FC Köln	Youth	Summer	2018	none	
20	MF	(Germany)	Salih Özcan	18	EU	1. FC Köln	Youth	Summer	2017	none	
	DF	(Brazil)	Bruno Nascimento	25	Non-EU	Tondela	Loan End	Summer	2017	none	
17	MF	(Germany)	Christian Clemens	25	EU	Mainz 05	Transfer	Winter	2021	undisclosed	
2	DF	(Serbia)	Neven Subotić	28	EU	Borussia Dortmund	Loan	Winter	2017	undisclosed	

==== Out ====
No.	Pos.	Nat.	Name	Age	EU	Moving to	Type	Transfer window	Transfer fee	Source
15	FW	(Austria)	Philipp Hosiner	27	EU	Rennes	Loan End	Summer	none	
29	MF	(Slovakia)	Dušan Švento	30	EU	Slavia Prague	Expired	Summer	none	
37	GK	(Germany)	Daniel Mesenhöler	20	EU	Union Berlin	Expired	Summer	none	
31	MF	(Germany)	Yannick Gerhardt	22	EU	VfL Wolfsburg	Transfer	Summer	undisclosed	
6	MF	(Germany)	Kevin Vogt	24	EU	1899 Hoffenheim	Transfer	Summer	undisclosed	
	DF	(Brazil)	Bruno Nascimento	25	Non-EU	Omonia Nicosia (Cyprus)	Transfer	Summer	undisclosed	
25	DF	(Serbia)	Filip Mladenović	25	Non-EU	Standard Liège	Loan	Winter	undisclosed	
15	DF	(Albania)	Mërgim Mavraj	30	EU	Hamburger SV	Transfer	Winter	undisclosed	

== Friendly matches ==
Win Draw Loss

14 July 2016 Friendly	AVITA-Auswahl	0–4	1. FC Köln	Oberwart, Austria
19:00 CEST (UTC+2)		Report	Modeste 15', 43'; Zoller 57'; Risse 73'	Stadium: Informstadion; Attendance: 500

23 July 2016 Friendly	Arminia Bielefeld	2–3	1. FC Köln	Bielefeld, Germany
18:30 CEST (UTC+2)	Klos 12' (pen.); Staude 59'	Report	Modeste 19', 30'; Risse 84'	Stadium: SchücoArena; Attendance: 6,194

24 July 2016 HBC SF	1. FC Köln	0–1	Málaga	Aachen, Germany
14:00 CEST (UTC+2)		Report	Fornals 19'	Stadium: Tivoli; Referee: Mitja Stegemann
Note: The match was only 45 minutes.

24 July 2016 HBC TPP	1. FC Köln	2–1	Marseille	Aachen, Germany
16:00 CEST (UTC+2)	Rudņevs 20'; Bittencourt 31'	Report	Rolando 23'	Stadium: Tivoli
Note: The match was only 45 minutes.

26 July 2016 Friendly	Fortuna Köln	1–0	1. FC Köln	Cologne, Germany
18:30 CEST (UTC+2)	Uaferro 3'	Report		Stadium: Südstadion; Attendance: 5,731

2 August 2016 Friendly	1. FC Köln	1–0	Bologna	Kitzbühel, Austria
18:00 CEST (UTC+2)	Heintz 84'	Report		Stadium: Sportplatz Kitzbühel; Attendance: 1,711

4 August 2016 Friendly	1. FC Köln	2–0	Eibar	Kitzbühel, Austria
18:00 CEST (UTC+2)	Mladenović 45' (pen.); Maroh 79'	Report		Stadium: Sportplatz Kitzbühel

11 August 2016 Friendly	Mainz 05	0–3	1. FC Köln	Mainz, Germany
15:00 CEST (UTC+2)		Report	Bittencourt 34', 56'; Osako 83'	Stadium: Bruchwegstadion
Note: Closed to the public.

24 May 2017 Friendly	Liaoning Whowin	0–5	1. FC Köln	Shenyang, China
19:30 CST (UTC+8)		Report	Bittencourt 9', 43'; Modeste 37', 44'; Zoller 45'	Stadium: Shenyang Olympic Sports Center Stadium; Attendance: 15,000

== Competitions ==
Win Draw Loss

=== Overview ===
Competition	First match	Last match	Starting round	Final position	Record							
Competition	First match	Last match	Starting round	Final position	Pld	W	D	L	GF	GA	GD	Win %
Bundesliga	27 August 2016	20 May 2017	Matchday 1	5th	34	12	13	9	51	42	+9	35.29
DFB-Pokal	20 August 2016	7 February 2017	First round	Round of 16	3	2	0	1	9	3	+6	66.67
Total					37	14	13	10	60	45	+15	37.84

Last updated: 27 May 2017
Source: Competitions

=== Bundesliga ===
==== League table ====
Pos	Team	Pld	W	D	L	GF	GA	GD	Pts	Qualification or relegation
3	Borussia Dortmund	34	18	10	6	72	40	+32	64	Qualification for the Champions League group stage
4	1899 Hoffenheim	34	16	14	4	64	37	+27	62	Qualification for the Champions League play-off round
5	1. FC Köln	34	12	13	9	51	42	+9	49	Qualification for the Europa League group stage (Note: Since the winners of the 2016–17 DFB-Pokal, Borussia Dortmund, qualified for the Champions League based on league position, the Europa League group stage spot was passed to the sixth-placed team, Hertha BSC; and the Europa League third qualifying round spot was passed to the seventh-placed team, SC Freiburg.)
6	Hertha BSC	34	15	4	15	43	47	−4	49	Qualification for the Europa League group stage
7	SC Freiburg	34	14	6	14	42	60	−18	48	Qualification for the Europa League third qualifying round

Source: DFB
Rules for classification: 1) Points; 2) Goal difference; 3) Goals scored; 4) Head-to-head points; 5) Head-to-head goal difference; 6) Head-to-head away goals scored; 7) Away goals scored; 8) Play-off.

==== Results summary ====
Overall								Home						Away					
Pld	W	D	L	GF	GA	GD	Pts	W	D	L	GF	GA	GD	W	D	L	GF	GA	GD
34	12	13	9	51	42	+9	49	9	6	2	29	17	+12	3	7	7	22	25	−3

Last updated: 27 May 2017.
Source: Bundesliga

==== Results by round ====
Round	1	2	3	4	5	6	7	8	9	10	11	12	13	14	15	16	17	18	19	20	21	22	23	24	25	26	27	28	29	30	31	32	33	34
Ground	H	A	H	A	H	A	H	A	H	A	A	H	A	H	A	H	A	A	H	A	H	A	H	A	H	A	H	H	A	H	A	H	A	H
Result	W	D	W	W	D	D	W	L	W	L	W	D	L	D	D	D	D	W	W	L	D	L	L	D	W	L	W	L	L	D	D	W	D	W
Position	2	3	4	2	3	4	2	5	4	6	4	5	7	7	7	7	7	7	7	7	7	7	7	7	6	6	5	7	7	8	8	7	7	5

Updated to match(es) played on 27 May 2017. Source: Bundesliga
A = Away; H = Home; W = Win; D = Draw; L = Loss

==== Matches ====
27 August 2016 1	1. FC Köln	2–0	Darmstadt 98	Cologne
15:30 CEST (UTC+2)	Risse 11'; Maroh (yellow card) 19'; Modeste 61'; Bittencourt (yellow card) 69'; Zoller (yellow card) 90+1'	Report	Fedetskyi (yellow card) 27'; Holland (yellow card) 38'; Höhn (yellow card) 47'	Stadium: RheinEnergieSTADION; Attendance: 50,000; Referee: Patrick Ittrich

10 September 2016 2	VfL Wolfsburg	0–0	1. FC Köln	Wolfsburg
15:30 CEST (UTC+2)	Caligiuri (yellow card) 30'; Błaszczykowski (yellow card) 57'	Report	Lehmann (yellow card) 66'; Höger (yellow card) 66'; Bittencourt (yellow card) 73'	Stadium: VOLKSWAGEN ARENA; Attendance: 29,067; Referee: Guido Winkmann

16 September 2016 3	1. FC Köln	3–0	SC Freiburg	Cologne
20:30 CEST (UTC+2)	Modeste 29', 43'; Bittencourt 31'; Risse (yellow card) 83'	Report	Höfler (yellow card) 39'	Stadium: RheinEnergieSTADION; Attendance: 47,200; Referee: Felix Zwayer

21 September 2016 4	Schalke 04	1–3	1. FC Köln	Gelsenkirchen
20:00 CEST (UTC+2)	Huntelaar 36'; Geis (yellow card) 68'; Bentaleb (yellow card) 84'	Report	Jojić (yellow card) 33'; Osako 38'; Modeste 77'; Zoller 83'	Stadium: VELTINS-Arena; Attendance: 60,876; Referee: Robert Hartmann

25 September 2016 5	1. FC Köln	1–1	RB Leipzig	Cologne
17:45 CEST (UTC+2)	Osako 25', (yellow card) 54'	Report	Burke 5'; Orban (yellow card) 39'; Bernardo (yellow card) 90+2'	Stadium: RheinEnergieSTADION; Attendance: 48,500; Referee: Benjamin Cortus
Note: The match was originally scheduled to start at 17:30, but was delayed 15 minutes due to a blockade preventing RB Leipzig's bus from entering the stadium.

1 October 2016 6	Bayern Munich	1–1	1. FC Köln	Munich
15:30 CEST (UTC+2)	Kimmich 40'; Martínez (yellow card) 68'	Report	Modeste 63'; Sørensen (yellow card) 65'; Zoller (yellow card) 68'	Stadium: Allianz Arena; Attendance: 75,000; Referee: Daniel Siebert

15 October 2016 7	1. FC Köln	2–1	FC Ingolstadt	Cologne
15:30 CEST (UTC+2)	Modeste 28', 39' (pen.); Lehmann (yellow card) 32'; Höger (yellow card) 75'; Sørensen (yellow card) 85'	Report	Suttner (yellow card) 45+1'; Hinterseer (yellow card) 87', (goal) 90' (pen.); Levels (yellow card) 90+2'	Stadium: RheinEnergieSTADION; Attendance: 49,200; Referee: Tobias Welz

22 October 2016 8	Hertha BSC	2–1	1. FC Köln	Berlin
15:30 CEST (UTC+2)	Ibišević 13'; Langkamp (yellow card) 44'; Stark 74'; Brooks (yellow card) 90+3'	Report	Modeste 65'; Heintz (yellow card) 73'	Stadium: Olympiastadion Berlin; Attendance: 60,576; Referee: Frank Willenborg

30 October 2016 9	1. FC Köln	3–0	Hamburger SV	Cologne
17:30 CET (UTC+1)	Modeste (yellow card) 21', (goal) 61', 82', 86'; Höger (yellow card) 33'; Rudņevs (yellow card) 36'	Report	Götz (yellow card) 40'; Wood (red card) 58'	Stadium: RheinEnergieSTADION; Attendance: 50,000; Referee: Benjamin Brand

5 November 2016 10	Eintracht Frankfurt	1–0	1. FC Köln	Frankfurt
18:30 CET (UTC+1)	Gaćinović 5'; Abraham (yellow card) 40'; Mascarell (yellow card) 65'; Fabián (yellow card) 90+1'	Report	Rausch (yellow card) 43'; Mavraj (yellow card) 79'; Osako (yellow card) 90'	Stadium: Commerzbank-Arena; Attendance: 51,500; Referee: Deniz Aytekin

19 November 2016 11	Borussia Mönchengladbach	1–2	1. FC Köln	Mönchengladbach
15:30 CET (UTC+1)	Stindl 32'; Strobl (yellow card) 87'	Report	Sørensen (yellow card) 33'; Heintz (yellow card) 35'; Lehmann (yellow card) 39'; Modeste 59'; Rudņevs (yellow card) 70'; Hector (yellow card) 87'; Risse 90+1'	Stadium: BORUSSIA-PARK; Attendance: 53,757; Referee: Manuel Gräfe

26 November 2016 12	1. FC Köln	0–0	FC Augsburg	Cologne
15:30 CET (UTC+1)	Heintz (yellow card) 20'; Hector (yellow card) 41'	Report	Ji (yellow card) 29'; Janker (yellow card) 36'; Baier (yellow card) 39'	Stadium: RheinEnergieSTADION; Attendance: 50,000; Referee: Markus Schmidt

3 December 2016 13	1899 Hoffenheim	4–0	1. FC Köln	Sinsheim
15:30 CET (UTC+1)	Wagner 8', 67'; Toljan 39', (yellow card) 71'; Uth 89'	Report	Mavraj (yellow card) 84'	Stadium: WIRSOL Rhein-Neckar-Arena; Attendance: 29,740; Referee: Günter Perl

10 December 2016 14	1. FC Köln	1–1	Borussia Dortmund	Cologne
15:30 CET (UTC+1)	Rudņevs 28'; Heintz (yellow card) 53'; Özcan (yellow card) 65' (yellow-red card) 90+4'; Höger (yellow card) 72'	Report	Schmelzer (yellow card) 28'; Dembélé (yellow card) 45+1'; Papastathopoulos (yellow card) 60'; Reus 90'	Stadium: RheinEnergieSTADION; Attendance: 50,000; Referee: Felix Zwayer

17 December 2016 15	Werder Bremen	1–1	1. FC Köln	Bremen
15:30 CET (UTC+1)	Gnabry 40'; Jóhannsson (yellow card) 87'	Report	Modeste (yellow card) 25'; Rudņevs 28'; Guirassy (yellow card) 85'; Höger (yellow card) 89'; Hector (yellow card) 90+1'	Stadium: Weser-Stadion; Attendance: 42,100; Referee: Wolfgang Stark

21 December 2016 16	1. FC Köln	1–1	Bayer Leverkusen	Cologne
20:00 CET (UTC+1)	Modeste 21'	Report	Wendell 44'	Stadium: RheinEnergieSTADION; Attendance: 50,000; Referee: Manuel Gräfe

22 January 2017 17	Mainz 05	0–0	1. FC Köln	Mainz
17:30 CET (UTC+1)	Bussmann (yellow card) 41'	Report	Sørensen (yellow card) 64'	Stadium: OPEL ARENA; Attendance: 29,314; Referee: Felix Brych

28 January 2017 18	Darmstadt 98	1–6	1. FC Köln	Darmstadt
15:30 CET (UTC+1)	Milošević (yellow card) 30'; Boyd (yellow card) 55'; Sam 66' (pen.)	Report	Modeste (yellow card) 29', (goal) 42'; Sulu 32' (o.g.); Osako 36', 72'; Clemens (yellow card) 41'; Rudņevs (yellow card) 65', (goal) 89'; Höger (yellow card) 66'; Jojić 85'	Stadium: Jonathan-Heimes-Stadion am Böllenfalltor; Attendance: 17,400; Referee: Robert Kampka

4 February 2017 19	1. FC Köln	1–0	VfL Wolfsburg	Cologne
15:30 CET (UTC+1)	Osako (yellow card) 34'; Clemens (yellow card) 43'; Olkowski (yellow card) 76'; Modeste 81' (pen.); Kessler (yellow card) 85'	Report	Bruma (yellow card) 58'; Vieirinha (yellow card) 67'; Guilavogui (yellow card) 85'	Stadium: RheinEnergieSTADION; Attendance: 49,400; Referee: Patrick Ittrich

12 February 2017 20	SC Freiburg	2–1	1. FC Köln	Freiburg im Breisgau
17:30 CET (UTC+1)	Grifo 32'; Haberer (yellow card) 53'; Philipp 77'	Report	Modeste 39'; Hector (yellow card) 84'	Stadium: Schwarzwald-Stadion; Attendance: 24,000; Referee: Robert Hartmann

19 February 2017 21	1. FC Köln	1–1	Schalke 04	Cologne
17:30 CET (UTC+1)	Subotić (yellow card) 21'; Modeste 43'; Sørensen (yellow card) 72'	Report	Schöpf 2', (yellow card) 81'; Stambouli (yellow card) 51'; Naldo (yellow card) 59'	Stadium: RheinEnergieSTADION; Attendance: 50,000; Referee: Tobias Stieler

25 February 2017 22	RB Leipzig	3–1	1. FC Köln	Leipzig
15:30 CET (UTC+1)	Forsberg 5'; Maroh 34' (o.g.); Ilsanker (yellow card) 62'; Werner 65'	Report	Maroh (yellow card) 7'; Rausch (yellow card) 39'; Osako 53'; Höger (yellow card) 68'; Hector (yellow card) 84'	Stadium: Red Bull Arena; Attendance: 39,335; Referee: Marco Fritz

4 March 2017 23	1. FC Köln	0–3	Bayern Munich	Cologne
15:30 CET (UTC+1)		Report	Martínez 25'; Vidal (yellow card) 34'; Bernat 48', (yellow card) 79'; Ribéry 90'	Stadium: RheinEnergieSTADION; Attendance: 50,000; Referee: Jochen Drees

11 March 2017 24	FC Ingolstadt	2–2	1. FC Köln	Ingolstadt
18:30 CET (UTC+1)	Suttner (yellow card) 37'; Kittel (yellow card) 38'; Lezcano 42'; Brégerie (yellow card) 61', (goal) 69'; Groß (yellow card) 90+2'	Report	Modeste 15' (pen.), 60'; Olkowski (yellow card) 28'; Heintz (yellow card) 83'; Lehmann (yellow card) 90+3'	Stadium: Audi Sportpark; Attendance: 15,200; Referee: Felix Zwayer

18 March 2017 25	1. FC Köln	4–2	Hertha BSC	Cologne
15:30 CET (UTC+1)	Osako 6'; Modeste 35', 37', 63'; Maroh (yellow card) 48'; Lehmann (yellow card) 52'	Report	Haraguchi (yellow card) 32'; Langkamp (yellow card) 41'; Ibišević 50' (pen.); Brooks 69'; Allagui (yellow card) 76'	Stadium: RheinEnergieSTADION; Attendance: 49,500; Referee: Marco Fritz

1 April 2017 26	Hamburger SV	2–1	1. FC Köln	Hamburg
15:30 CEST (UTC+2)	Müller 13'; Holtby (yellow card) 60', (goal) 90+1'; Walace (yellow card) 67'	Report	Jojić 25', (yellow card) 37'; Zoller (yellow card) 34'; Guirassy (yellow card) 77'	Stadium: Volksparkstadion; Attendance: 57,000; Referee: Daniel Siebert

4 April 2017 27	1. FC Köln	1–0	Eintracht Frankfurt	Cologne
20:00 CEST (UTC+2)	Jojić 53'	Report	Wolf (yellow card) 74'; Gaćinović (yellow card) 90+4'	Stadium: RheinEnergieSTADION; Attendance: 49,300; Referee: Wolfgang Stark

8 April 2017 28	1. FC Köln	2–3	Borussia Mönchengladbach	Cologne
15:30 CEST (UTC+2)	Clemens 18'; Heintz (yellow card) 56'; Modeste 58'; Klünter (yellow card) 82'	Report	Vestergaard 13'; Traoré 55'; Dahoud (yellow card) 58'; Stindl 80'; Hazard (yellow card) 89'	Stadium: RheinEnergieSTADION; Attendance: 50,000; Referee: Felix Brych

15 April 2017 29	FC Augsburg	2–1	1. FC Köln	Augsburg
15:30 CEST (UTC+2)	Hinteregger 5'; Verhaegh (yellow card) 16', (goal) 23' (pen.); Koo (yellow card) 60' (yellow-red card) 89'; Kohr (yellow card) 80'; Finnbogason (red card) 90+2'	Report	Lehmann (yellow card) 34'; Max 65' (o.g.); Hector (yellow card) 82'; Klünter (yellow card) 90+2'	Stadium: WWK ARENA; Attendance: 30,660; Referee: Guido Winkmann

21 April 2017 30	1. FC Köln	1–1	1899 Hoffenheim	Cologne
20:30 CEST (UTC+2)	Heintz (yellow card) 21'; Bittencourt 58'; Osako (yellow card) 90+2'	Report	Demirbay 90+3'	Stadium: RheinEnergieSTADION; Attendance: 49,600; Referee: Marco Fritz

29 April 2017 31	Borussia Dortmund	0–0	1. FC Köln	Dortmund
15:30 CEST (UTC+2)	Durm (yellow card) 9'; Castro (yellow card) 84'	Report	Bittencourt (yellow card) 39'; Klünter (yellow card) 90'	Stadium: SIGNAL IDUNA PARK; Attendance: 81,360; Referee: Tobias Stieler

5 May 2017 32	1. FC Köln	4–3	Werder Bremen	Cologne
20:30 CEST (UTC+2)	Modeste 13', 47'; Bittencourt 28'; Zoller 44'	Report	Delaney (yellow card) 21'; Bartels 34'; Gebre Selassie 40'; Moisander (yellow card) 60'; Gnabry 62'	Stadium: RheinEnergieSTADION; Attendance: 50,000; Referee: Wolfgang Stark

13 May 2017 33	Bayer Leverkusen	2–2	1. FC Köln	Leverkusen
15:30 CEST (UTC+2)	Kießling 60'; Pohjanpalo 71'	Report	Jojić 14'; Klünter 49'; Lehmann (yellow card) 62'; Rausch (yellow card) 90+2'	Stadium: BayArena; Attendance: 30,210; Referee: Günter Perl

20 May 2017 34	1. FC Köln	2–0	Mainz 05	Cologne
15:30 CEST (UTC+2)	Rausch (yellow card) 20'; Hector 43'; Klünter (yellow card) 64'; Osako 87'	Report	Bell (yellow card) 45+1'	Stadium: RheinEnergieSTADION; Attendance: 50,000; Referee: Robert Hartmann

=== DFB-Pokal ===
20 August 2016 First round	BFC Preussen	0–7	1. FC Köln	Berlin
15:30 CEST (UTC+2)		Report	Rausch 19'; Modeste 45', (yellow card) 60'; Maroh 68'; Risse 71'; Rudņevs 75'; Osako 79', 88'	Stadium: Stadion An der Alten Försterei; Attendance: 6,318; Referee: Alexander Sather

26 October 2016 Second round	1. FC Köln	2–1 (a.e.t.)	1899 Hoffenheim	Cologne
20:45 CEST (UTC+2)	Risse 36'; Sørensen (yellow card) 90+2'; Modeste 91', (yellow card) 96'	Report	Hübner 8'; Demirbay (yellow card) 33'; Szalai (yellow card) 112'	Stadium: RheinEnergieSTADION; Attendance: 43,000; Referee: Marco Fritz

7 February 2017 Round of 16	Hamburger SV	2–0	1. FC Köln	Hamburg
18:30 CET (UTC+1)	Jung 5'; Walace (yellow card) 51'; Kostić (yellow card) 53'; Wood 75'; Diekmeier (yellow card) 90+2'	Report	Rausch (yellow card) 58'	Stadium: Volksparkstadion; Attendance: 45,143; Referee: Günter Perl

== Statistics ==
=== Goalscorers ===
No.	Pos	Nat	Player	Total		Bundesliga		DFB-Pokal	
No.	Pos	Nat	Player	Apps	Goals	Apps	Goals	Apps	Goals
27	FW	(France) FRA	Anthony Modeste	32	25	29	23	3	2
13	FW	(Japan) JPN	Yuya Osako	29	8	27	6	2	2
7	MF	(Germany) GER	Marcel Risse	15	4	13	2	2	2
9	FW	(Latvia) LVA	Artjoms Rudņevs	19	4	16	3	3	1
8	MF	(Serbia) SRB	Miloš Jojić	16	3	14	3	2	0
17	MF	(Germany) GER	Christian Clemens	11	1	11	1	0	0
21	MF	(Germany) GER	Leonardo Bittencourt	13	1	11	1	2	0
5	DF	(Slovenia) SVN	Dominic Maroh	14	1	12	0	2	1
11	FW	(Germany) GER	Simon Zoller	25	1	22	1	3	0
34	MF	(Germany) GER	Konstantin Rausch	27	1	24	0	3	1

As of 15 April 2017

=== Disciplinary record ===
Competition	Record			
Competition	Games	Red cards	Yellow/Red	Yellow cards
Bundesliga	29	0	1	64
DFB-Pokal	3	0	0	4
Total	32	0	1	68
Updated: 18 April 2017
