= 2019–20 Hertha BSC season =

Hertha
2019–20 season
- Chairman: Werner Gegenbauer
- Head coach: Ante Čović (until 27 November); Jürgen Klinsmann (from 27 November to 11 February); Alexander Nouri (interim, from 11 February to 9 April); Bruno Labbadia (from 9 April)
- Stadium: Olympiastadion
- Bundesliga: 10th
- DFB-Pokal: Round of 16
- Top goalscorer: League: Vedad Ibišević; Dodi Lukebakio (7 each); All: Vedad Ibišević (9)
Home colours	Away colours	Third colours

The 2019–20 season was Hertha BSC's 121st season in existence, and the club's 7th consecutive and 37th overall season in the top flight of German football. In addition to the domestic league, Hertha BSC participated in this season's edition of the DFB-Pokal. The season covered a period from 1 July 2019 to 30 June 2020.

== Players ==
=== Current squad ===
As of 31 January 2020

Note: Flags indicate national team as defined under FIFA eligibility rules; some limited exceptions apply. Players may hold more than one non-FIFA nationality.

No.	Pos.	Nation	Player
1	GK	GER	Thomas Kraft
2	DF	SVK	Peter Pekarík
3	MF	NOR	Per Ciljan Skjelbred
4	DF	NED	Karim Rekik (3rd captain)
5	DF	GER	Niklas Stark (4th captain)
6	MF	CZE	Vladimír Darida
7	FW	POL	Krzysztof Piątek
8	FW	CIV	Salomon Kalou (vice-captain)
9	FW	GER	Alexander Esswein
11	MF	AUS	Mathew Leckie
12	GK	GER	Dennis Smarsch
13	DF	GER	Lukas Klünter
14	FW	GER	Pascal Köpke
15	MF	SRB	Marko Grujić (on loan from Liverpool)
16	MF	NED	Javairô Dilrosun
17	DF	GER	Maximilian Mittelstädt

No.	Pos.	Nation	Player
18	MF	ARG	Santiago Ascacíbar
19	FW	BIH	Vedad Ibišević (captain)
20	DF	BEL	Dedryck Boyata
21	DF	GER	Marvin Plattenhardt
22	GK	NOR	Rune Jarstein
23	MF	GER	Arne Maier
24	FW	GER	Palkó Dárdai
25	DF	GER	Jordan Torunarigha
26	FW	BRA	Matheus Cunha
27	FW	GER	Davie Selke
28	FW	BEL	Dodi Lukebakio
29	DF	GER	Florian Baak
30	FW	GER	Marius Wolf (on loan from Borussia Dortmund)
32	FW	GER	Dennis Jastrzembski
33	FW	NED	Daishawn Redan
36	FW	TUR	Muhammed Kiprit
39	MF	GER	Julian Albrecht

=== Players out on loan ===
Note: Flags indicate national team as defined under FIFA eligibility rules; some limited exceptions apply. Players may hold more than one non-FIFA nationality.

No.	Pos.	Nation	Player
—	GK	GER	Nils Körber (at VfL Osnabrück until 30 June 2020)
—	MF	GER	Maurice Covic (at Ascoli Calcio until 30 June 2020)
—	MF	SVK	Ondrej Duda (at Norwich City until 30 June 2020)

No.	Pos.	Nation	Player
—	MF	GER	Eduard Löwen (at FC Augsburg until 30 June 2021)
—	MF	FRA	Lucas Tousart (at Lyon until 30 June 2020)

== Transfers ==
=== Transfers in ===
#	Position	Player	Transferred from	Fee	Date	Source
20	DF	(Belgium) Dedryck Boyata	(Scotland) Celtic	Free	19 May 2019	
7	MF	(Germany) Eduard Löwen	(Germany) 1. FC Nürnberg	€7,000,000	1 July 2019	
33	FW	(Netherlands) Daishawn Redan	(England) Chelsea U23	€2,700,000	18 July 2019	
28	FW	(Belgium) Dodi Lukebakio	(England) Watford	€20,000,000	1 August 2019	
18	MF	(Argentina) Santiago Ascacibar	(Germany) VfB Stuttgart	€10,000,000	1 January 2020	
	MF	(France) Lucas Tousart	(France) Lyon	€25,000,000	27 January 2020	
7	FW	(Poland) Krzysztof Piątek	(Italy) Milan	€24,000,000	30 January 2020	
26	FW	(Brazil) Matheus Cunha	(Germany) RB Leipzig	€18,000,000	31 January 2020	

==== Loans in ====
#	Position	Player	Loaned from	Date	Loan expires	Source
15	MF	(Serbia) Marko Grujić	(England) Liverpool	1 July 2018	30 June 2020	
30	FW	(Germany) Marius Wolf	(Germany) Borussia Dortmund	2 September 2019	30 June 2020	

=== Transfers out ===
#	Position	Player	Transferred to	Fee	Date	Source
30	MF	(Germany) Julius Kade	(Germany) Union Berlin	Free	30 May 2019	
35	GK	(Germany) Marius Gersbeck	(Germany) Karlsruher SC	€45,000	1 July 2019	
33	GK	(Germany) Jonathan Klinsmann	(Switzerland) FC St. Gallen	Free	1 July 2019	
20	MF	(Austria) Valentino Lazaro	(Italy) Inter Milan	€22,400,000	1 July 2019	
28	MF	(Switzerland) Fabian Lustenberger	(Switzerland) BSC Young Boys	Free	1 July 2019	
26	MF	(Germany) Sidney Friede	(Germany) Wehen Wiesbaden	Free	1 January 2020	

==== Loans out ====
#	Position	Player	Loaned to	Date	Loan expires	Source
	GK	(Germany) Nils Körber	(Germany) VfL Osnabrück	1 July 2018	30 June 2020	
7	MF	(Germany) Eduard Löwen	(Germany) FC Augsburg	5 January 2020	30 June 2020	
34	FW	(Germany) Maurice Covic	(Italy) Ascoli	9 January 2020	30 June 2020	
10	MF	(Slovakia) Ondrej Duda	(England) Norwich City	12 January 2020	30 June 2020	
	MF	(France) Lucas Tousart	(France) Lyon	28 January 2020	30 June 2020	
32	FW	(Germany) Dennis Jastrzembski	(Germany) SC Paderborn	31 January 2020	30 June 2021	
33	FW	(Netherlands) Daishawn Redan	(Netherlands) FC Groningen	31 January 2020	30 June 2020	
27	FW	(Germany) Davie Selke	(Germany) Werder Bremen	31 January 2020	30 June 2021	

== Pre-season and friendlies ==
Win Draw Loss

20 July 2019 Friendly	VfL Bochum (Germany)	1–1	(Germany) Hertha BSC	Bochum, Germany
18:00 CEST (UTC+2)	Blum 22'	Report	Duda 44'	Stadium: Vonovia-Ruhrstadion; Attendance: 7,500; Referee: Thorben Siewer

25 July 2019 Friendly	Hertha BSC (Germany)	2–1	(Turkey) Fenerbahçe	Hartberg, Austria
19:30 CEST (UTC+2)	Redan 58'; Ibišević 81'	Report	Sağlam (yellow card) 62'; Sayyadmanesh 82'; Tunç (yellow card) 86'	Stadium: Profertil Arena Hartberg

31 July 2019 Friendly	Hertha BSC (Germany)	3–5	(England) West Ham United	Ritzing, Austria
18:00 CEST (UTC+2)	Köpke 4', 61'; Selke 21'	Report	Fornals 11'; Lanzini 29'; Haller 70'; Diangana 78'; Antonio 90'	Stadium: Sonnenseestadion

3 August 2019 Friendly	Crystal Palace (England)	0–4	(Germany) Hertha BSC	Selhurst, England
15:00 BST (UTC+1)		Report	Duda 44'; Ibišević 52'; Mittelstadt 76'; Selke 82' (pen.)	Stadium: Selhurst Park

9 January 2020 Friendly	Eintracht Frankfurt (Germany)	1–2	(Germany) Hertha BSC	St. Petersburg, United States
19:00 ET (UTC−5)	Chandler 73'	Report	Esswein 71', 78' (pen.)	Stadium: Al Lang Stadium; Attendance: 4,500

== Competitions ==
Win Draw Loss

=== Overview ===
Competition	First match	Last match	Starting round	Final position	Record							
Competition	First match	Last match	Starting round	Final position	Pld	W	D	L	GF	GA	GD	Win %
Bundesliga	17 August 2019	27 June 2020	Matchday 1	10th	34	11	8	15	48	59	−11	32.35
DFB-Pokal	10 August 2019	4 February 2020	First round	Round of 16	3	1	1	1	10	7	+3	33.33
Total					37	12	9	16	58	66	−8	32.43

Last updated: 27 June 2020
Source: Soccerway

=== Bundesliga ===
==== League table ====
Pos	Team	Pld	W	D	L	GF	GA	GD	Pts
8	SC Freiburg	34	13	9	12	48	47	+1	48
9	Eintracht Frankfurt	34	13	6	15	59	60	−1	45
10	Hertha BSC	34	11	8	15	48	59	−11	41
11	Union Berlin	34	12	5	17	41	58	−17	41
12	Schalke 04	34	9	12	13	38	58	−20	39

Source: DFB
Rules for classification: 1) Points; 2) Goal difference; 3) Goals scored; 4) Head-to-head results; 5) Head-to-head away goals scored; 6) Away goals scored; 7) Play-off.

==== Results summary ====
Overall								Home						Away					
Pld	W	D	L	GF	GA	GD	Pts	W	D	L	GF	GA	GD	W	D	L	GF	GA	GD
34	11	8	15	48	59	−11	41	6	3	8	23	32	−9	5	5	7	25	27	−2

Last updated: 27 June 2020.
Source: Bundesliga

==== Results by round ====
Round	1	2	3	4	5	6	7	8	9	10	11	12	13	14	15	16	17	18	19	20	21	22	23	24	25	26	27	28	29	30	31	32	33	34
Ground	A	H	H	A	H	A	H	A	H	A	H	A	H	A	H	A	H	A	H	A	H	A	H	A	H	A	H	A	H	A	H	A	H	A
Result	D	L	L	L	W	W	W	D	L	L	L	L	L	D	W	W	D	L	W	D	L	W	L	D	D	W	W	D	W	L	L	L	W	L
Position	8	11	17	18	15	10	10	10	11	11	12	14	16	15	13	13	12	14	13	14	14	13	14	14	13	11	11	10	9	9	11	11	10	10

Updated to match(es) played on 27 June 2020. Source: Bundesliga
A = Away; H = Home; W = Win; D = Draw; L = Loss

==== Matches ====
The Bundesliga schedule was announced on 28 June 2019.

16 August 2019 1	Bayern Munich	2–2	Hertha BSC	Munich
20:30 CEST (UTC+2)	Lewandowski 24', 60' (pen.), (yellow card) 76'; Müller (yellow card) 71'; Pavard (yellow card) 75'	Report	Darida (yellow card) 17'; Lukebakio 36'; Grujić 38', (yellow card) 58'; Mittelstädt (yellow card) 90+1'	Stadium: Allianz Arena; Attendance: 75,000; Referee: Harm Osmers

25 August 2019 2	Hertha BSC	0–3	VfL Wolfsburg	Berlin
18:00 CEST (UTC+2)	Duda (yellow card) 36'	Report	Weghorst 9' (pen.); Brekalo 82'; Roussillon 90+1'	Stadium: Olympiastadion; Attendance: 42,738; Referee: Guido Winkmann

31 August 2019 3	Schalke 04	3–0	Hertha BSC	Gelsenkirchen
15:30 CEST (UTC+2)	Stark 38' (o.g.); Rekik 48' (o.g.); Mascarell (yellow card) 52'; Kenny 85'	Report	Ibišević (yellow card) 40'	Stadium: Veltins-Arena; Attendance: 58,875; Referee: Tobias Stieler

14 September 2019 4	Mainz 05	2–1	Hertha BSC	Mainz
15:30 CEST (UTC+2)	St. Juste (yellow card) 33', (goal) 88'; Quaison 40'; Kunde (yellow card) 89'	Report	Skjelbred (yellow card) 37'; Stark (yellow card) 75'; Grujić 83'	Stadium: Opel Arena; Attendance: 22,798; Referee: Marco Fritz

21 September 2019 5	Hertha BSC	2–1	SC Paderborn	Berlin
15:30 CEST (UTC+2)	Dilrosun 10', (yellow card) 90+4'; Selke (yellow card) 45+1'; Wolf 52'; Klünter (yellow card) 82'; Ibišević (yellow card) 90+3'	Report	Gjasula (yellow card) 45+1'; Strohdiek (yellow card) 50'; Zolinski 54'; Vasiliadis (yellow card) 76'; Ritter (yellow card) 90+3'	Stadium: Olympiastadion; Attendance: 43,588; Referee: Frank Willenborg

29 September 2019 6	1. FC Köln	0–4	Hertha BSC	Cologne
18:00 CEST (UTC+2)	Meré (red card) 41'; Terodde (yellow card) 72'	Report	Dilrosun 23'; Ibišević 58', 62'; Boyata 83'	Stadium: RheinEnergieStadion; Attendance: 49,700; Referee: Sören Storks

4 October 2019 7	Hertha BSC	3–1	Fortuna Düsseldorf	Berlin
20:30 CEST (UTC+2)	Boyata (yellow card) 31'; Ibišević 37'; Dilrosun 44'; Skjelbred (yellow card) 52'; Grujić (yellow card) 55'; Darida 62'	Report	Hennings 32' (pen.); Bodzek (yellow card) 45'; Morales (yellow card) 75'; Tekpetey (yellow card) 88'	Stadium: Olympiastadion; Attendance: 37,128; Referee: Martin Petersen

19 October 2019 8	Werder Bremen	1–1	Hertha BSC	Bremen
15:30 CEST (UTC+2)	Sargent 7'; Bittencourt (yellow card) 80'	Report	Klünter (yellow card) 58'; Lukebakio 70'	Stadium: Weser-Stadion; Attendance: 41,447; Referee: Felix Brych

26 October 2019 9	Hertha BSC	2–3	1899 Hoffenheim	Berlin
15:30 CEST (UTC+2)	Lukebakio 55'; Kalou 69'; Darida (yellow card) 78' (yellow-red card) 84'; Ibišević (yellow card) 78'	Report	Locadia 33'; Kramarić 38'; Rudy (yellow card) 56'; Kadeřábek (yellow card) 74'; Hübner 79'; Baumann (yellow card) 90'	Stadium: Olympiastadion; Attendance: 44,702; Referee: Markus Schmidt

2 November 2019 10	Union Berlin	1–0	Hertha BSC	Berlin
18:30 CET (UTC+1)	Schlotterbeck (yellow card) 61'; Polter 87' (pen.)	Report	Boyata (yellow card) 69'	Stadium: Stadion An der Alten Försterei; Attendance: 22,012; Referee: Deniz Aytekin

9 November 2019 11	Hertha BSC	2–4	RB Leipzig	Berlin
15:30 CET (UTC+1)	Mittelstädt (yellow card) 23', (goal) 32'; Selke 90+2'; Darida (yellow card) 90+4'	Report	Ilsanker (yellow card) 17'; Werner 38' (pen.), 90+1'; Sabitzer 45+1'; Kampl 87'	Stadium: Olympiastadion; Attendance: 48,532; Referee: Sören Storks

24 November 2019 12	FC Augsburg	4–0	Hertha BSC	Augsburg
15:30 CET (UTC+1)	Max 17'; Córdova 26'; Hahn 52'; Niederlechner 79'	Report	Grujić (yellow card) 24'; Jarstein (red card) 28'; Stark (yellow card) 76'	Stadium: WWK Arena; Attendance: 29,233; Referee: Sascha Stegemann

30 November 2019 13	Hertha BSC	1–2	Borussia Dortmund	Berlin
15:30 CET (UTC+1)	Grujić (yellow card) 5'; Darida (yellow card) 18', (goal) 34'; Ibišević (yellow card) 83'	Report	Sancho 15'; Hazard 17'; Hummels (yellow card) 19' (yellow-red card) 45'	Stadium: Olympiastadion; Attendance: 74,667; Referee: Sven Jablonski

6 December 2019 14	Eintracht Frankfurt	2–2	Hertha BSC	Frankfurt
20:30 CET (UTC+1)	Touré (yellow card) 52'; Hinteregger 65'; Paciência (yellow card) 71'; Hasebe (yellow card) 72'; Rode 86'	Report	Duda (yellow card) 9'; Stark (yellow card) 24'; Lukebakio 30'; Grujić 63'; Selke (yellow card) 72'; Kraft (yellow card) 90+3'	Stadium: Commerzbank-Arena; Attendance: 50,000; Referee: Christian Dingert

14 December 2019 15	Hertha BSC	1–0	SC Freiburg	Berlin
15:30 CET (UTC+1)	Boyata (yellow card) 4'; Darida 53'; Wolf (yellow card) 90+2'	Report		Stadium: Olympiastadion; Attendance: 37,343; Referee: Frank Willenborg

18 December 2019 16	Bayer Leverkusen	0–1	Hertha BSC	Leverkusen
18:30 CET (UTC+1)	Volland (yellow card) 71'; Paulinho (yellow card) 76'	Report	Grujić (yellow card) 29'; Rekik 64'; Skjelbred (yellow card) 75'; Dilrosun (yellow card) 86'	Stadium: BayArena; Attendance: 24,472; Referee: Bastian Dankert

21 December 2019 17	Hertha BSC	0–0	Borussia Mönchengladbach	Berlin
18:30 CET (UTC+1)	Selke (yellow card) 24'; Boyata (yellow card) 50'	Report	Bensebaini (yellow card) 21'; Zakaria (yellow card) 60'	Stadium: Olympiastadion; Attendance: 50,208; Referee: Harm Osmers

19 January 2020 18	Hertha BSC	0–4	Bayern Munich	Berlin
15:30 CET (UTC+1)	Darida (yellow card) 7'; Jarstein (yellow card) 64'; Boyata (yellow card) 81'	Report	Pavard (yellow card) 19'; Müller 60'; Lewandowski 73' (pen.); Thiago 75'; Perišić 84'	Stadium: Olympiastadion; Attendance: 74,667; Referee: Tobias Stieler

25 January 2020 19	VfL Wolfsburg	1–2	Hertha BSC	Wolfsburg
15:30 CET (UTC+1)	Mehmedi 68'	Report	Torunarigha (yellow card) 37', (goal) 74'; Lukebakio 90'	Stadium: Volkswagen Arena; Attendance: 24,894; Referee: Markus Schmidt

31 January 2020 20	Hertha BSC	0–0	Schalke 04	Berlin
20:30 CET (UTC+1)	Mittelstädt (yellow card) 90+1'	Report	Oczipka (yellow card) 71'	Stadium: Olympiastadion; Attendance: 47,863; Referee: Sascha Stegemann

8 February 2020 21	Hertha BSC	1–3	Mainz 05	Berlin
15:30 CET (UTC+1)	Ascacíbar (yellow card) 36'; Wolf (yellow card) 70' (yellow-red card) 89'; Boyata 84', (yellow card) 90+2'	Report	Quaison 17', 82', 90+4' (pen.); Latza (yellow card) 69'	Stadium: Olympiastadion; Attendance: 35,049; Referee: Martin Petersen

15 February 2020 22	SC Paderborn	1–2	Hertha BSC	Paderborn
15:30 CET (UTC+1)	Srbeny 51'; Schonlau (yellow card) 66'; Collins (yellow card) 73'	Report	Boyata 10'; Stark (yellow card) 50'; Collins 67' (o.g.); Cunha (yellow card) 68'	Stadium: Benteler-Arena; Attendance: 14,687; Referee: Bibiana Steinhaus

22 February 2020 23	Hertha BSC	0–5	1. FC Köln	Berlin
15:30 CET (UTC+1)	Stark (yellow card) 45+2'; Ascacíbar (yellow card) 69'	Report	Córdoba 4', 22'; Jarstein 37' (o.g.); Meré (yellow card) 55'; Kainz 62'; Uth 69'; Rexhbecaj (yellow card) 77'	Stadium: Olympiastadion; Attendance: 46,207; Referee: Daniel Schlager

28 February 2020 24	Fortuna Düsseldorf	3–3	Hertha BSC	Düsseldorf
20:30 CET (UTC+1)	Karaman 6', 45+1'; Thommy 9', (yellow card) 40'; Bodzek (yellow card) 52'	Report	Klünter (yellow card) 35'; Cunha (yellow card) 60', (goal) 66'; Thommy 64' (o.g.); Piątek 75' (pen.)	Stadium: Merkur Spiel-Arena; Attendance: 31,632; Referee: Tobias Stieler

7 March 2020 25	Hertha BSC	2–2	Werder Bremen	Berlin
15:30 CET (UTC+1)	Stark 41', (yellow card) 82'; Darida (yellow card) 59'; Cunha 60'; Klünter (yellow card) 62'	Report	Sargent 3', (yellow card) 71'; Klaassen 6', (yellow card) 82'; Vogt (yellow card) 76'	Stadium: Olympiastadion; Attendance: 58,028; Referee: Guido Winkmann

16 May 2020 26	1899 Hoffenheim	0–3	Hertha BSC	Sinsheim
15:30 CEST (UTC+2)	Baumgartner (yellow card) 48'; Geiger (yellow card) 83'	Report	Pekarík (yellow card) 11'; Boyata (yellow card) 29'; Grujić (yellow card) 40'; Akpoguma 58' (o.g.); Ibišević 60'; Cunha 74'	Stadium: PreZero Arena; Attendance: 0 Referee: Christian Dingert
Note: The match was postponed on 13 March due to the pandemic of COVID-19 in Germany, and rescheduled to 16 May.

22 May 2020 27	Hertha BSC	4–0	Union Berlin	Berlin
20:30 CEST (UTC+2)	Lukebakio (yellow card) 43', (goal) 52'; Ibišević 51'; Cunha 61'; Grujić (yellow card) 67'; Boyata 77'	Report	Parensen (yellow card) 9'	Stadium: Olympiastadion; Attendance: 0 Referee: Harm Osmers
Note: The match was postponed on 13 March due to the pandemic of COVID-19 in Germany, and rescheduled to 22 May.

27 May 2020 28	RB Leipzig	2–2	Hertha BSC	Leipzig
18:30 CEST (UTC+2)	Klostermann 24'; Halstenberg (yellow card) 45+4' (yellow-red card) 63'; Schick 68'	Report	Grujić 9'; Pekarík (yellow card) 42'; Torunarigha (yellow card) 57'; Piątek 82' (pen.); Cunha (yellow card) 90+4'	Stadium: Red Bull Arena; Attendance: 0 Referee: Bastian Dankert
Note: The match was postponed on 24 March due to the pandemic of COVID-19 in Germany, and rescheduled to 27 May.

30 May 2020 29	Hertha BSC	2–0	FC Augsburg	Berlin
15:30 CEST (UTC+2)	Grujić (yellow card) 20'; Dilrosun 23'; Mittelstädt (yellow card) 37'; Piątek (yellow card) 87', (goal) 90+3'	Report	Khedira (yellow card) 9'; Uduokhai (yellow card) 71'; Baier (yellow card) 75'	Stadium: Olympiastadion; Attendance: 0 Referee: Sven Jablonski
Note: The match was postponed on 24 March due to the pandemic of COVID-19 in Germany, and rescheduled to 30 May.

6 June 2020 30	Borussia Dortmund	1–0	Hertha BSC	Dortmund
18:30 CEST (UTC+2)	Can 58'	Report	Esswein (yellow card) 76'; Piątek (yellow card) 77'	Stadium: Signal Iduna Park; Attendance: 0 Referee: Harm Osmers
Note: The match was postponed on 24 March due to the pandemic of COVID-19 in Germany, and rescheduled to 6 June.

13 June 2020 31	Hertha BSC	1–4	Eintracht Frankfurt	Berlin
15:30 CEST (UTC+2)	Boyata (yellow card) 6', (red card) 45+1'; Piątek 24'; Plattenhardt (yellow card) 76'	Report	Dost 51'; Silva 62', 86'; Ndicka 68'; Kostić (yellow card) 75'; Ilsanker (yellow card) 83'	Stadium: Olympiastadion; Attendance: 0 Referee: Robert Hartmann
Note: The match was postponed on 24 March due to the pandemic of COVID-19 in Germany, and rescheduled to 13 June.

16 June 2020 32	SC Freiburg	2–1	Hertha BSC	Freiburg
20:30 CEST (UTC+2)	Grifo 61'; Petersen 71'	Report	Torunarigha (yellow card) 23'; Darida (yellow card) 53'; Ibišević 66' (pen.)	Stadium: Schwarzwald-Stadion; Attendance: 0 Referee: Tobias Stieler
Note: The match was postponed on 24 March due to the pandemic of COVID-19 in Germany, and rescheduled to 16 June.

20 June 2020 33	Hertha BSC	2–0	Bayer Leverkusen	Berlin
15:30 CEST (UTC+2)	Cunha 22'; Lukebakio (yellow card) 45', (goal) 54'; Grujić (yellow card) 70'; Klünter (yellow card) 86'; Stark (yellow card) 90+2'	Report	Tapsoba (yellow card) 52'; Dragović (yellow card) 80'; Alario (yellow card) 83'	Stadium: Olympiastadion; Attendance: 0 Referee: Felix Brych
Note: The match was postponed on 24 March due to the pandemic of COVID-19 in Germany, and rescheduled to 20 June.

27 June 2020 34	Borussia Mönchengladbach	2–1	Hertha BSC	Mönchengladbach
15:30 CEST (UTC+2)	Hofmann 7'; Kramer (yellow card) 43'; Embolo 78'	Report	Skjelbred (yellow card) 50'; Stark (yellow card) 52'; Ibišević 90+1'	Stadium: Borussia-Park; Attendance: 0 Referee: Deniz Aytekin
Note: The match was postponed on 7 May due to the pandemic of COVID-19 in Germany, and rescheduled to 27 June.

=== DFB-Pokal ===
11 August 2019 First round	VfB Eichstätt	1–5	Hertha BSC	Ingolstadt
15:30 CEST (UTC+2)	Kügel 51'	Report	Darida 11'; Ibišević 12', 31'; Torunarigha (yellow card) 18'; Kalou 62'; Esswein 75'	Stadium: Audi Sportpark; Attendance: 7,030; Referee: Timo Gerach

30 October 2019 Second round	Hertha BSC	3–3 (a.e.t.) (5–4 p)	Dynamo Dresden	Berlin
20:45 CET (UTC+1)	Lukebakio 48'; Duda (yellow card) 67', (goal) 85' (pen.); Ibišević (yellow card) 101'; Kraft (yellow card) 120+1'; Torunarigha 120+2'	Report	Koné 36'; Ebert 90' (pen.); Štor 107'; Hartmann (yellow card) 111'	Stadium: Olympiastadion; Attendance: 70,429; Referee: Tobias Stieler
	Penalties
	Ibišević (penalty scored); Darida (penalty scored); Dilrosun (penalty scored); Rekik (penalty missed); Selke (penalty scored); Grujić (penalty scored)		(penalty scored) Ebert; (penalty scored) Horvath; (penalty missed) Müller; (penalty scored) Koné; (penalty scored) Štor; (penalty missed) Ehlers

4 February 2020 Round of 16	Schalke 04	3–2 (a.e.t.)	Hertha BSC	Gelsenkirchen
20:45 CET (UTC+1)	Harit (yellow card) 65', (goal) 82'; Caligiuri 76'; Raman (yellow card) 80', (goal) 115'; Miranda (yellow card) 105+2'; Oczipka (yellow card) 111'	Report	Köpke 12'; Piątek 39'; Torunarigha (yellow card) 85' (yellow-red card) 100'; Skjelbred (yellow card) 103'	Stadium: Veltins-Arena; Attendance: 53,525; Referee: Harm Osmers

== Statistics ==
=== Appearances and goals ===
No.	Pos	Nat	Player	Total		Bundesliga		DFB-Pokal	
No.	Pos	Nat	Player	Apps	Goals	Apps	Goals	Apps	Goals
Goalkeepers
1	GK	(Germany) GER	Thomas Kraft	5	0	4	0	1	0
12	GK	(Germany) GER	Dennis Smarsch	2	0	1+1	0	0	0
22	GK	(Norway) NOR	Rune Jarstein	31	0	29	0	2	0
Defenders
2	DF	(Slovakia) SVK	Peter Pekarík	9	0	9	0	0	0
4	DF	(Netherlands) NED	Karim Rekik	16	1	14	1	2	0
5	DF	(Germany) GER	Niklas Stark	24	1	20+1	1	3	0
13	DF	(Germany) GER	Lukas Klünter	24	0	20+3	0	0+1	0
17	DF	(Germany) GER	Maximilian Mittelstädt	29	1	20+7	1	1+1	0
20	DF	(Belgium) BEL	Dedryck Boyata	29	4	28	4	1	0
21	DF	(Germany) GER	Marvin Plattenhardt	19	0	17	0	2	0
25	DF	(Germany) GER	Jordan Torunarigha	21	2	16+2	1	2+1	1
29	DF	(Germany) GER	Florian Baak	0	0	0	0	0	0
Midfielders
3	MF	(Norway) NOR	Per Ciljan Skjelbred	25	0	21+3	0	1	0
6	MF	(Czech Republic) CZE	Vladimír Darida	30	4	25+3	3	2	1
7	MF	(Germany) GER	Eduard Löwen	7	0	2+5	0	0	0
10	MF	(Slovakia) SVK	Ondrej Duda	9	1	6+1	0	2	1
11	MF	(Australia) AUS	Mathew Leckie	9	0	1+6	0	1+1	0
15	MF	(Serbia) SRB	Marko Grujić	30	4	28	4	2	0
16	MF	(Netherlands) NED	Javairô Dilrosun	25	4	16+7	4	1+1	0
18	MF	(Argentina) ARG	Santiago Ascacíbar	9	0	7+1	0	1	0
23	MF	(Germany) GER	Arne Maier	15	0	5+9	0	1	0
39	MF	(Germany) GER	Julian Albrecht	0	0	0	0	0	0
40	MF	(Germany) GER	Lazar Samardžić	3	0	0+3	0	0	0
Forwards
7	FW	(Poland) POL	Krzysztof Piątek	16	5	9+6	4	1	1
8	FW	(Ivory Coast) CIV	Salomon Kalou	7	2	1+4	1	2	1
9	FW	(Germany) GER	Alexander Esswein	8	1	0+7	0	0+1	1
14	FW	(Germany) GER	Pascal Köpke	5	1	1+3	0	1	1
19	FW	(Bosnia and Herzegovina) BIH	Vedad Ibišević	27	9	15+10	7	1+1	2
24	FW	(Germany) GER	Palkó Dárdai	0	0	0	0	0	0
26	FW	(Brazil) BRA	Matheus Cunha	11	5	9+2	5	0	0
28	FW	(Belgium) BEL	Dodi Lukebakio	33	8	24+6	7	1+2	1
30	FW	(Germany) GER	Marius Wolf	23	1	15+6	1	2	0
33	FW	(Germany) GER	Jessic Ngankam	4	0	0+4	0	0	0
Players transferred out during the season
27	FW	(Germany) GER	Davie Selke	21	1	10+9	1	0+2	0
32	FW	(Germany) GER	Dennis Jastrzembski	0	0	0	0	0	0
33	FW	(Netherlands) NED	Daishawn Redan	1	0	0+1	0	0	0

Last updated: 27 June 2020
Source: Competitions
