= Yuya Osako =

Japanese footballer (born 1990)

Yuya Osako 大迫 勇也
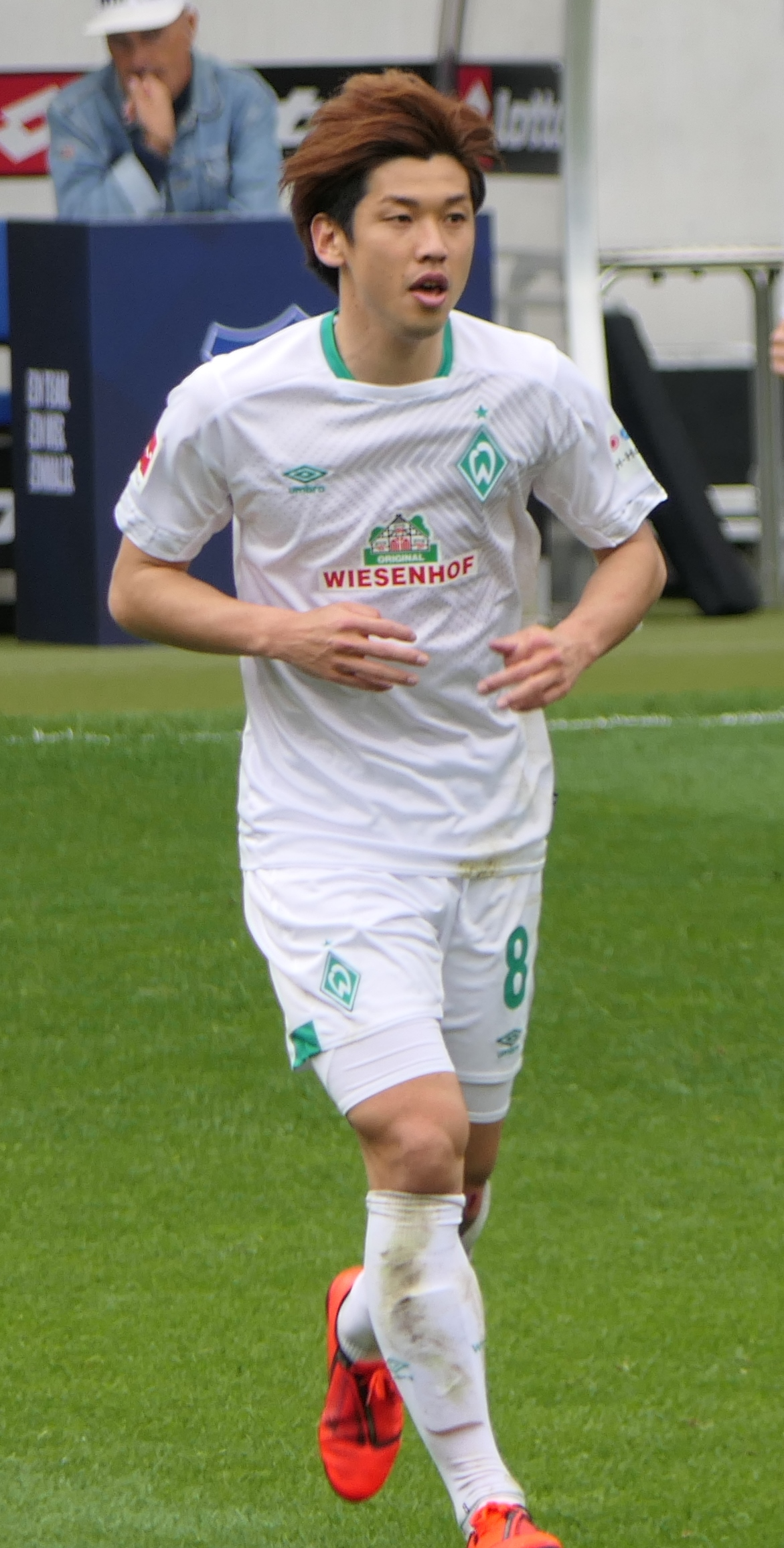
- Osako with Werder Bremen

Personal information
- Full name: Yuya Osako
- Date of birth: 18 May 1990 (age 36)
- Place of birth: Kaseda, Kagoshima, Japan
- Height: 1.84 m (6 ft 0 in)
- Position: Forward

Team information
- Current team: Vissel Kobe
- Number: 10

Youth career
- Bansei SSS
- 2003–2005: Kagoshima Ikueikan Junior High School
- 2006–2008: Kagoshima Josei High School

Senior career*
| Years | Team | Apps | (Gls) |
| 2009–2013 | Kashima Antlers | 139 | (40) |
| 2014 | 1860 Munich | 15 | (6) |
| 2014–2018 | 1. FC Köln | 108 | (15) |
| 2018–2021 | Werder Bremen | 75 | (11) |
| 2021– | Vissel Kobe | 154 | (57) |

International career^{‡}
| 2009 | Japan U20 | 7 | (1) |
| 2010 | Japan U21 | 3 | (0) |
| 2011 | Japan U22 | 5 | (2) |
| 2013–2022 | Japan | 57 | (25) |
Medal record
Representing Japan
AFC Asian Cup
| Runner-up | 2019 United Arab Emirates |
- * Club domestic league appearances and goals as of 10 August 2026 ‡ National team caps and goals as of 1 February 2022

Yuya Osako (大迫 勇也, Ōsako Yūya; born 18 May 1990) is a Japanese professional footballer who plays as a forward for J1 League club Vissel Kobe.

== Club career ==
=== 1860 Munich ===
On 6 January 2014, Osako joined German side TSV 1860 Munich for the second half of the 2014–2015 season. He scored on his debut, the opener in a 1–1 draw against Fortuna Düsseldorf. He finished the season with 6 goals in 15 appearances.

=== 1. FC Köln ===
In June 2014, Osako transferred to 1. FC Köln signing a three-year contract. It was reported Kashima Antlers received a transfer fee of €1.5 million while 1860 Munich earned €500,000. In October 2016, he agreed a contract extension until summer 2020 with Köln. On 28 April 2018, he played as Köln lost 3–2 to SC Freiburg which confirmed their relegation from the Bundesliga.

=== Werder Bremen ===
On 16 May 2018, it was announced that Osako would join Werder Bremen for the 2018–19 season. He scored on his debut on 19 August 2018, netting the first goal with a header in a 6–1 win against Wormatia Worms in the first round of the DFB-Pokal.

In February 2019, he was voted the 2018 Japanese Footballer of the Year.

=== Vissel Kobe ===
Osako returned to Japan in August 2021, joining Vissel Kobe.

== International career ==
In May 2018, he was named in the Japan national team's preliminary squad for the 2018 World Cup in Russia. In the opening match against Colombia, he scored the second goal for Japan by a header, thus helping Japan become the first Asian team to beat a South American team in the World Cup history. He also appeared for Japan in the 2019 AFC Asian Cup hosted by the United Arab Emirates. He scored four goals to help them reach the final, where they eventually lost to Qatar, 3–1.

== Career statistics ==
=== Club ===
As of 8 October 2024

Appearances and goals by club, season and competition
| Club | Season | League | | | National cup (Note: Includes Emperor's Cup, DFB-Pokal) | | League cup (Note: Includes J.League Cup) | | Continental | | Other | | Total | |
| Club | Season | Division | Apps | Goals | Apps | Goals | Apps | Goals | Apps | Goals | Apps | Goals | Apps | Goals |
|---|---|---|---|---|---|---|---|---|---|---|---|---|---|---|
| Kashima Antlers | 2009 | J. League Division 1 | 22 | 3 | 2 | 0 | 1 | 0 | 5 (Note: Appearances in AFC Champions League) | 3 | 1 | 0 | 31 | 6 |
| Kashima Antlers | 2010 | J. League Division 1 | 27 | 4 | 5 | 3 | 0 | 0 | 5 | 1 | 0 | 0 | 37 | 8 |
| Kashima Antlers | 2011 | J. League Division 1 | 25 | 5 | 3 | 1 | 3 | 3 | 4 | 1 | 1 | 0 | 36 | 10 |
| Kashima Antlers | 2012 | J. League Division 1 | 32 | 9 | 3 | 1 | 9 | 7 | – | | 1 | 0 | 45 | 17 |
| Kashima Antlers | 2013 | J. League Division 1 | 33 | 19 | 1 | 0 | 7 | 2 | – | | 1 | 3 | 42 | 24 |
| Kashima Antlers | Total | | 139 | 40 | 14 | 5 | 20 | 12 | 14 | 5 | 4 | 3 | 191 | 65 |
| 1860 Munich | 2013–14 | 2. Bundesliga | 15 | 6 | 0 | 0 | – | | – | | – | | 15 | 6 |
| 1. FC Köln | 2014–15 | Bundesliga | 28 | 3 | 1 | 0 | – | | 0 | 0 | – | | 29 | 3 |
| 1. FC Köln | 2015–16 | Bundesliga | 25 | 1 | 2 | 0 | – | | 0 | 0 | – | | 27 | 1 |
| 1. FC Köln | 2016–17 | Bundesliga | 30 | 7 | 2 | 2 | – | | 0 | 0 | – | | 32 | 9 |
| 1. FC Köln | 2017–18 | Bundesliga | 25 | 4 | 1 | 0 | – | | 6 (Note: Appearances in UEFA Europa League) | 2 | – | | 32 | 6 |
| 1. FC Köln | Total | | 108 | 15 | 6 | 2 | – | | 6 | 2 | – | | 120 | 19 |
| Werder Bremen | 2018–19 | Bundesliga | 21 | 3 | 2 | 2 | – | | – | | – | | 23 | 5 |
| Werder Bremen | 2019–20 | Bundesliga | 28 | 8 | 4 | 1 | – | | – | | 2 (Note: Appearances in Bundesliga relegation play-offs) | 0 | 34 | 9 |
| Werder Bremen | 2020–21 | Bundesliga | 24 | 0 | 4 | 1 | – | | – | | – | | 28 | 1 |
| Werder Bremen | 2021–22 | 2. Bundesliga | 2 | 0 | – | | – | | – | | – | | 2 | 0 |
| Werder Bremen | Total | | 75 | 11 | 10 | 4 | – | | – | | 2 | 0 | 87 | 15 |
| Vissel Kobe | 2021 | J1 League | 11 | 4 | – | | – | | – | | – | | 11 | 4 |
| Vissel Kobe | 2022 | J1 League | 26 | 7 | 2 | 2 | 1 | 1 | 6 | 3 | – | | 35 | 13 |
| Vissel Kobe | 2023 | J1 League | 34 | 22 | 4 | 1 | 1 | 1 | – | | – | | 39 | 24 |
| Vissel Kobe | 2024 | J1 League | 32 | 11 | 2 | 1 | 0 | 0 | 0 | 0 | 1 | 0 | 35 | 12 |
| Vissel Kobe | Total | | 103 | 44 | 8 | 4 | 2 | 2 | 6 | 3 | 1 | 0 | 120 | 53 |
| Career total | | | 440 | 116 | 38 | 15 | 22 | 14 | 26 | 10 | 7 | 3 | 433 | 158 |

=== International ===
As of match played 27 January 2022

Appearances and goals by national team and year
| National team | Year | Apps | Goals |
|---|---|---|---|
| Japan | 2013 | 6 | 3 |
| Japan | 2014 | 6 | 0 |
| Japan | 2015 | 3 | 0 |
| Japan | 2016 | 2 | 2 |
| Japan | 2017 | 8 | 2 |
| Japan | 2018 | 12 | 3 |
| Japan | 2019 | 8 | 5 |
| Japan | 2020 | 1 | 0 |
| Japan | 2021 | 9 | 9 |
| Japan | 2022 | 1 | 1 |
| Total | | 56 | 25 |

As of match played 27 January 2022
Scores and results list Japan's goal tally first, score column indicates score after each Osako goal.

List of international goals scored by Yuya Osako
| No. | Date | Venue | Opponent | Score | Result | Competition |
|---|---|---|---|---|---|---|
| 1 | 25 July 2013 | Hwaseong Stadium, Hwaseong, South Korea | Australia | 2–0 | 3–2 | 2013 EAFF East Asian Cup |
| 2 | 25 July 2013 | Hwaseong Stadium, Hwaseong, South Korea | Australia | 3–2 | 3–2 | 2013 EAFF East Asian Cup |
| 3 | 16 November 2013 | Cristal Arena, Genk, Belgium | Netherlands | 1–2 | 2–2 | Friendly |
| 4 | 11 November 2016 | Kashima Soccer Stadium, Kashima, Japan | Oman | 1–0 | 4–0 | Friendly |
| 5 | 11 November 2016 | Kashima Soccer Stadium, Kashima, Japan | Oman | 2–0 | 4–0 | Friendly |
| 6 | 13 June 2017 | Shahid Dastgerdi Stadium, Tehran, Iran | Iraq | 1–0 | 1–1 | 2018 FIFA World Cup qualification |
| 7 | 6 October 2017 | Toyota Stadium, Toyota, Japan | New Zealand | 1–0 | 2–1 | Friendly |
| 8 | 19 June 2018 | Mordovia Arena, Saransk, Russia | Colombia | 2–1 | 2–1 | 2018 FIFA World Cup |
| 9 | 16 October 2018 | Saitama Stadium 2002, Saitama, Japan | Uruguay | 2–1 | 4–3 | 2018 Kirin Challenge Cup |
| 10 | 20 November 2018 | Toyota Stadium, Toyota, Japan | Kyrgyzstan | 3–0 | 4–0 | 2018 Kirin Challenge Cup |
| 11 | 9 January 2019 | Al Nahyan Stadium, Abu Dhabi, United Arab Emirates | Turkmenistan | 1–1 | 3–2 | 2019 AFC Asian Cup |
| 12 | 9 January 2019 | Al Nahyan Stadium, Abu Dhabi, United Arab Emirates | Turkmenistan | 2–1 | 3–2 | 2019 AFC Asian Cup |
| 13 | 28 January 2019 | Hazza bin Zayed Stadium, Al Ain, United Arab Emirates | Iran | 1–0 | 3–0 | 2019 AFC Asian Cup |
| 14 | 28 January 2019 | Hazza bin Zayed Stadium, Al Ain, United Arab Emirates | Iran | 2–0 | 3–0 | 2019 AFC Asian Cup |
| 15 | 5 September 2019 | Kashima Soccer Stadium, Kashima, Japan | Paraguay | 1–0 | 2–0 | 2019 Kirin Challenge Cup |
| 16 | 30 March 2021 | Fukuda Denshi Arena, Chiba, Japan | Mongolia | 2–0 | 14–0 | 2022 FIFA World Cup qualification |
| 17 | 30 March 2021 | Fukuda Denshi Arena, Chiba, Japan | Mongolia | 5–0 | 14–0 | 2022 FIFA World Cup qualification |
| 18 | 30 March 2021 | Fukuda Denshi Arena, Chiba, Japan | Mongolia | 13–0 | 14–0 | 2022 FIFA World Cup qualification |
| 19 | 28 May 2021 | Fukuda Denshi Arena, Chiba, Japan | Myanmar | 2–0 | 10–0 | 2022 FIFA World Cup qualification |
| 20 | 28 May 2021 | Fukuda Denshi Arena, Chiba, Japan | Myanmar | 3–0 | 10–0 | 2022 FIFA World Cup qualification |
| 21 | 28 May 2021 | Fukuda Denshi Arena, Chiba, Japan | Myanmar | 4–0 | 10–0 | 2022 FIFA World Cup qualification |
| 22 | 28 May 2021 | Fukuda Denshi Arena, Chiba, Japan | Myanmar | 5–0 | 10–0 | 2022 FIFA World Cup qualification |
| 23 | 28 May 2021 | Fukuda Denshi Arena, Chiba, Japan | Myanmar | 9–0 | 10–0 | 2022 FIFA World Cup qualification |
| 24 | 7 September 2021 | Khalifa International Stadium, Doha, Qatar | China | 1–0 | 1–0 | 2022 FIFA World Cup qualification |
| 25 | 27 January 2022 | Saitama Stadium 2002, Saitama, Japan | China | 1–0 | 2–0 | 2022 FIFA World Cup qualification |

== Honours ==
Kashima Antlers

- J.League Division 1: 2009
- Emperor's Cup: 2010
- J.League Cup: 2011, 2012
- Japanese Super Cup: 2009, 2010
- Suruga Bank Championship: 2012, 2013

Vissel Kobe

- J1 League: 2023, 2024
- Emperor's Cup: 2024
- J1 100 Year Vision League: 2026

Japan

- EAFF East Asian Cup: 2013
- AFC Asian Cup Runner-up: 2019

Individual

- Japanese Footballer of the Year: 2018, 2023
- J.League Cup MVP: 2011
- J.League Cup top scorer: 2012
- J1 League Monthly MVP: August 2013, May 2023, July 2023
- AFC Asian Cup Team of the Tournament: 2019
- J.League Player of the Year: 2023
- J.League Top Scorer: 2023
- J.League Best XI: 2023, 2024
- Japan Pro-Footballers Association awards: Best XI (2023)
