= Lukas Klünter =

German footballer

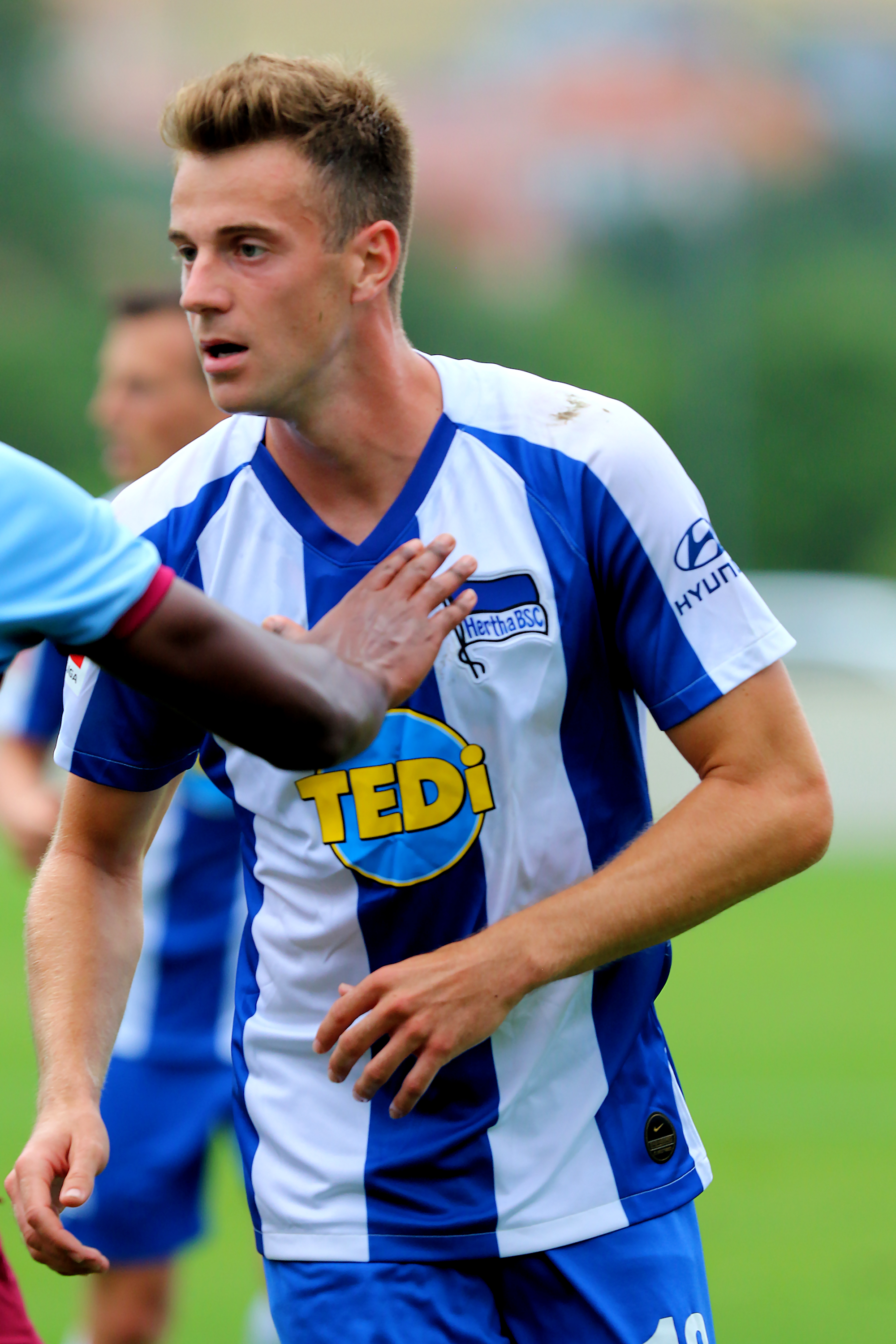
- Klünter in 2019

Personal information
- Date of birth: 26 May 1996 (age 30)
- Place of birth: Euskirchen, Germany
- Height: 1.84 m (6 ft 0 in)
- Positions: Midfielder; defender

Team information
- Current team: Waldhof Mannheim
- Number: 24

Youth career
- 2013–2014: Bonner SC

Senior career*
Years	Team	Apps	(Gls)
2015–2018	1. FC Köln II	52	(3)
2016–2018	1. FC Köln	28	(2)
2018–2022	Hertha BSC	49	(0)
2022–2023	Arminia Bielefeld	23	(0)
2024–	Waldhof Mannheim	81	(0)

International career^{‡}
2015	Germany U19	6	(0)
2015–2017	Germany U20	13	(0)
2017	Germany U21	3	(0)
Medal record
UEFA European Under-21 Championship
Winner	2017
- * Club domestic league appearances and goals as of 29 May 2026 ‡ National team caps and goals as of 26 March 2019

Lukas Klünter (born 26 May 1996) is a German professional footballer who plays as a midfielder or defender for 3. Liga club Waldhof Mannheim.

== Club career ==
Klünter broke into Köln's senior team during the 2016–17 season. In May 2017, he scored his first professional goal for Köln in a 2–2 draw with Bayer Leverkusen. After the team's relegation following the 2017–18 season it was announced that Klünter would transfer to Hertha BSC in the summer. He played for both the first team and the reserve team during the 2018–19 season.

On 5 August 2022, Klünter signed with Arminia Bielefeld.

On 1 February 2024, Klünter joined Waldhof Mannheim in 3. Liga.

== International career ==
Klünter is a youth international for Germany.

== Career statistics ==
As of match played on 4 July 2020

Appearances and goals by club, season and competition
Club	Season	League			Cup		Continental		Total	
Club	Season	Division	Apps	Goals	Apps	Goals	Apps	Goals	Apps	Goals
1. FC Köln II	2014–15	Regionalliga West	7	0	—		—		7	0
1. FC Köln II	2015–16	Regionalliga West	24	2	—		—		24	2
1. FC Köln II	2016–17	Regionalliga West	17	1	—		—		17	1
1. FC Köln II	2017–18	Regionalliga West	4	0	—		—		4	0
1. FC Köln II	Total		52	3	—		—		52	3
1. FC Köln	2015–16	Bundesliga	1	0	0	0	—		1	0
1. FC Köln	2016–17	Bundesliga	8	1	0	0	—		8	1
1. FC Köln	2017–18	Bundesliga	19	1	2	0	3 (Note: Appearances in the UEFA Europa League.)	0	24	1
1. FC Köln	Total		28	2	2	0	3	0	33	2
Hertha BSC	2018–19	Bundesliga	10	0	1	0	—		11	0
Hertha BSC	2019–20	Bundesliga	23	0	0	0	—		23	0
Hertha BSC	Total		33	0	1	0	0	0	34	0
Hertha BSC II	2018–19	Regionalliga Nord	1	0	—		—		1	0
Career total			106	5	4	0	3	0	113	5

== Honours ==
Germany

- UEFA European Under-21 Championship: 2017
