= 2017–18 1. FC Köln season =

1. FC Köln
2017–18 season
- President: Werner Spinner
- Manager: Peter Stöger (until 3 December); Stefan Ruthenbeck (interim, 3 December – 20 December; head coach, from 20 December)
- Stadium: RheinEnergieStadion
- Bundesliga: 18th (relegated)
- DFB-Pokal: Round of 16
- Europa League: Group stage
- Top goalscorer: League: Leonardo Bittencourt; Simon Terodde (5 each); All: Serhou Guirassy (7 goals)
- Highest home attendance: 50,000
- Lowest home attendance: 41,100
- Average home league attendance: 48,776
- Biggest win: Lehe 0–5 Köln
- Biggest defeat: Hoffenheim 6–0 Köln
Home colours	Away colours	Third colours
- All statistics correct as of 21 May 2018.

The 2017–18 1. FC Köln season is the 70th season in the football club's history and 4th consecutive and 47th overall season in the top flight of German football, the Bundesliga, having been promoted from the 2. Bundesliga in 2014. In addition to the domestic league, 1. FC Köln also are participating in this season's editions of the domestic cup, the DFB-Pokal, and the second-tier continental cup, the UEFA Europa League. This is the 70th season for Köln in the RheinEnergieStadion, located in Cologne, North Rhine-Westphalia, Germany. The season covers a period from 1 July 2017 to 30 June 2018.

== Players ==
=== Squad information ===
As of 18 April 2018

Note: Flags indicate national team as defined under FIFA eligibility rules; some limited exceptions apply. Players may hold more than one non-FIFA nationality.

No.	Pos.	Nation	Player
1	GK	GER	Timo Horn
2	DF	GER	Kevin Goden
3	DF	GER	Dominique Heintz
4	DF	DEN	Frederik Sørensen
5	DF	SVN	Dominic Maroh
6	MF	GER	Marco Höger
7	MF	GER	Marcel Risse
8	MF	SRB	Miloš Jojić
9	FW	GER	Simon Terodde
11	FW	GER	Simon Zoller
13	FW	JPN	Yuya Osako
14	DF	GER	Jonas Hector (Vice-captain)
15	FW	COL	Jhon Córdoba
16	DF	POL	Paweł Olkowski
17	MF	GER	Christian Clemens
18	GK	GER	Thomas Kessler
19	FW	FRA	Serhou Guirassy

No.	Pos.	Nation	Player
20	MF	GER	Salih Özcan
21	MF	GER	Leonardo Bittencourt
22	DF	ESP	Jorge Meré
23	DF	GER	Jannes Horn
24	DF	GER	Lukas Klünter
25	DF	POR	João Queirós
26	MF	GER	Chris Führich
27	DF	SRB	Filip Kusić
29	DF	GER	Tim Handwerker
33	MF	GER	Matthias Lehmann (Captain)
35	GK	GER	Sven Müller
37	MF	GER	Anas Ouahim
38	MF	DEN	Nikolas Nartey
39	FW	PER	Claudio Pizarro
40	DF	GER	Yann Aurel Bisseck
41	MF	FRA	Vincent Koziello

=== Transfers ===
==== In ====
No.	Pos	Player	From	Type	Window	Ends	Fee	Source
15	FW	(Colombia) Jhon Córdoba	(Germany) Mainz 05	Transfer	Summer	2021	€ 17M	
22	DF	(Spain) Jorge Meré	(Spain) Sporting Gijón	Transfer	Summer	2022	€ 7M	
23	DF	(Germany) Jannes Horn	(Germany) VfL Wolfsburg	Transfer	Summer	2022	€ 7M	
25	DF	(Portugal) João Queirós	(Portugal) Braga B	Transfer	Summer	2022	€ 3M	
29	DF	(Germany) Tim Handwerker	(Germany) Bayer Leverkusen II	Transfer	Summer	2022	none	
38	MF	(Denmark) Nikolas Nartey	(Germany) 1. FC Köln II	Youth	Summer	2020	none	
39	FW	(Peru) Claudio Pizarro	(Germany) Werder Bremen	Transfer	Summer	2018	none	
9	FW	(Germany) Simon Terodde	(Germany) VfB Stuttgart	Transfer	Winter	2021	€ 3M	
41	MF	(France) Vincent Koziello	(France) Nice	Transfer	Winter	2022	€ 3M	

==== Out ====
No.	Pos	Player	To	Type	Window	Fee	Source
2	DF	(Serbia) Neven Subotić	(Germany) Borussia Dortmund	Loan End	Summer	—	
9	FW	(Latvia) Artjoms Rudņevs	Retired	Released	Summer	—	
27	FW	(France) Anthony Modeste	(China) Tianjin Quanjian	Transfer	Summer	€34.7M	
30	MF	(Germany) Marcel Hartel	(Germany) Union Berlin	Transfer	Summer	€0.25M	
34	DF	(Russia) Konstantin Rausch	(Russia) Dynamo Moscow	Transfer	Winter	€1.5M	

== Friendly matches ==
Win Draw Loss

9 July 2017 Friendly	Grazer AK	1−10	1. FC Köln	Graz, Austria
17:00 CEST (UTC+2)	Mihaljević 32'		Córdoba 14', 33'; Rudņevs 25', 28'; Clemens 54', 56'; Bittencourt 72'; Zoller 74'; Nartey 82'; Guirassy 84'	Stadium: Sportzentrum Graz-Weinzödl

21 July 2017 Friendly	KFC Uerdingen 05	0–0	1. FC Köln	Krefeld
19:00 CEST (UTC+2)				Stadium: Grotenburg-Stadion

23 July 2017 Friendly	Eintracht Braunschweig	2−2	1. FC Köln	Braunschweig
15:30 CEST (UTC+2)	Zuck 60'; Kumbela 70'		Rudņevs 28' (pen.), 30'	Stadium: Eintracht-Stadion

31 July 2017 Friendly	Bologna	1−1	1. FC Köln	Kitzbühel, Austria
20:00 CEST (UTC+2)	Petković 9'	Report	Zoller 29'	Stadium: Sportplatz Langau; Attendance: 1,311

1 August 2017 Friendly	LASK Linz	2–2	1. FC Köln	Kitzbühel, Austria
18:30 CEST (UTC+2)	Bruno 39'; Gartler 43'	Report	Jojić 14'; Guirassy 90'	Stadium: Sportplatz Langau

7 August 2017 Friendly	TSV Steinbach	1−1	1. FC Köln	Haiger
18:30 CEST (UTC+2)	Trkulja 52'	Report	Maroh 44'	Stadium: SIBRE-Sportpark

30 August 2017 Friendly	TV Herkenrath	2−7	1. FC Köln	Bergisch Gladbach
19:00 CEST (UTC+2)	Löffelsend 7', 43'	Report	Guirassy 33'; Rudņevs 56', 62', 77'; Córdoba 57', 73'; Olkowski 59'	Stadium: BELKAW-Arena

== Competitions ==
Win Draw Loss

=== Overview ===
Competition	First match	Last match	Starting round	Final position	Record							
Competition	First match	Last match	Starting round	Final position	Pld	W	D	L	GF	GA	GD	Win %
Bundesliga	20 August 2017	12 May 2018	Matchday 1		34	5	7	22	35	70	−35	14.71
DFB-Pokal	12 August 2017	19 December 2017	First round	Round of 16	3	2	0	1	8	2	+6	66.67
Europa League	14 September 2017	7 December 2017	Group stage	Group stage	6	2	0	4	7	8	−1	33.33
Total					43	9	7	27	50	80	−30	20.93

Last updated: 21 May 2018
Source: Competitions

=== Bundesliga ===
==== League table ====
Pos	Team	Pld	W	D	L	GF	GA	GD	Pts	Qualification or relegation
14	Mainz 05	34	9	9	16	38	52	−14	36	
15	SC Freiburg	34	8	12	14	32	56	−24	36	
16	VfL Wolfsburg (O)	34	6	15	13	36	48	−12	33	Qualification for the relegation play-offs
17	Hamburger SV (R)	34	8	7	19	29	53	−24	31	Relegation to 2. Bundesliga
18	1. FC Köln (R)	34	5	7	22	35	70	−35	22	Relegation to 2. Bundesliga

Source: DFB
Rules for classification: 1) Points; 2) Goal difference; 3) Goals scored; 4) Head-to-head results; 5) Head-to-head away goals scored; 6) Away goals scored; 7) Play-off.
(O) Play-off winners; (R) Relegated

==== Results summary ====
Overall								Home						Away					
Pld	W	D	L	GF	GA	GD	Pts	W	D	L	GF	GA	GD	W	D	L	GF	GA	GD
34	5	7	22	35	70	−35	22	3	5	9	20	30	−10	2	2	13	15	40	−25

Last updated: 21 May 2018.
Source: Bundesliga

==== Results by round ====
Round	1	2	3	4	5	6	7	8	9	10	11	12	13	14	15	16	17	18	19	20	21	22	23	24	25	26	27	28	29	30	31	32	33	34
Ground	A	H	A	A	H	A	H	A	H	A	H	A	H	A	H	A	H	H	A	H	H	A	H	A	H	A	H	A	H	A	H	A	H	A
Result	L	L	L	L	L	D	L	L	D	L	L	L	L	D	L	L	W	W	W	D	L	L	D	W	L	L	W	L	D	L	D	L	L	L
Position	11	17	18	18	18	18	18	18	18	18	18	18	18	18	18	18	18	18	18	18	18	18	18	18	18	18	17	17	18	18	18	18	18	18

Updated to match(es) played on 21 May 2018. Source: Bundesliga
A = Away; H = Home; W = Win; D = Draw; L = Loss

==== Matches ====
20 August 2017 1	Borussia Mönchengladbach	1–0	1. FC Köln	Mönchengladbach
18:00 CEST (UTC+2)	Elvedi 49'	Report		Stadium: Borussia-Park; Attendance: 54,018; Referee: Deniz Aytekin

25 August 2017 2	1. FC Köln	1–3	Hamburger SV	Cologne
20:30 CEST (UTC+2)	Sørensen 90+7'	Report	Hahn 28'; Wood 34'; Holtby 90+10'	Stadium: RheinEnergieStadion; Attendance: 50,000; Referee: Felix Brych

9 September 2017 3	FC Augsburg	3–0	1. FC Köln	Augsburg
15:30 CEST (UTC+2)	Finnbogason 21', 32' (pen.), 90+4'	Report		Stadium: WWK Arena; Attendance: 27,510; Referee: Tobias Stieler

17 September 2017 4	Borussia Dortmund	5–0	1. FC Köln	Dortmund
18:00 CEST (UTC+2)	Philipp 2', 69'; Papastathopoulos 45+1'; Aubameyang 59' (pen.), 60'	Report		Stadium: Signal Iduna Park; Attendance: 81,000; Referee: Patrick Ittrich

20 September 2017 5	1. FC Köln	0–1	Eintracht Frankfurt	Cologne
18:30 CEST (UTC+2)		Report	Haller 22' (pen.)	Stadium: RheinEnergieStadion; Attendance: 49,000; Referee: Martin Petersen

24 September 2017 6	Hannover 96	0–0	1. FC Köln	Hanover
15:30 CEST (UTC+2)		Report		Stadium: HDI-Arena; Attendance: 47,000; Referee: Daniel Siebert

1 October 2017 7	1. FC Köln	1–2	RB Leipzig	Cologne
18:00 CEST (UTC+2)	Osako 82'	Report	Klostermann 30'; Poulsen 80'	Stadium: RheinEnergieStadion; Attendance: 48,700; Referee: Felix Zwayer

13 October 2017 8	VfB Stuttgart	2–1	1. FC Köln	Stuttgart
20:30 CEST (UTC+2)	Donis 38'; Akolo 90+4'	Report	Heintz 77'	Stadium: Mercedes-Benz Arena; Attendance: 58,716; Referee: Benjamin Cortus

22 October 2017 9	1. FC Köln	0–0	Werder Bremen	Cologne
13:30 CEST (UTC+2)		Report		Stadium: RheinEnergieStadion; Attendance: 50,000; Referee: Robert Kampka

28 October 2017 10	Bayer Leverkusen	2–1	1. FC Köln	Leverkusen
15:30 CEST (UTC+2)	Bailey 54'; S. Bender 73'	Report	Guirassy 23'	Stadium: BayArena; Attendance: 30,210; Referee: Manuel Gräfe

5 November 2017 11	1. FC Köln	0–3	1899 Hoffenheim	Cologne
15:30 CET (UTC+1)		Report	Geiger 9'; Wagner 56' (pen.), 80'	Stadium: RheinEnergieStadion; Attendance: 49,200; Referee: Deniz Aytekin

18 November 2017 12	Mainz 05	1–0	1. FC Köln	Mainz
15:30 CET (UTC+1)	Brosinski 43' (pen.)	Report		Stadium: Opel Arena; Attendance: 30,473; Referee: Felix Brych

26 November 2017 13	1. FC Köln	0–2	Hertha BSC	Cologne
18:00 CET (UTC+1)		Report	Ibišević 17', 64' (pen.)	Stadium: RheinEnergieStadion; Attendance: 47,800; Referee: Bibiana Steinhaus

2 December 2017 14	Schalke 04	2–2	1. FC Köln	Gelsenkirchen
18:30 CET (UTC+1)	Burgstaller 36'; Harit 72'	Report	Guirassy 50', 77' (pen.)	Stadium: Veltins-Arena; Attendance: 61,761; Referee: Tobias Stieler

10 December 2017 15	1. FC Köln	3–4	SC Freiburg	Cologne
13:30 CET (UTC+1)	Klünter 8'; Guirassy 16' (pen.); Stanko 29' (o.g.)	Report	Petersen 39', 90' (pen.), 90+6' (pen.); Haberer 65'	Stadium: RheinEnergieStadion; Attendance: 45,100; Referee: Robert Kampka

13 December 2017 16	Bayern Munich	1–0	1. FC Köln	Munich
20:30 CET (UTC+1)	Lewandowski 60'	Report		Stadium: Allianz Arena; Attendance: 75,000; Referee: Daniel Siebert

16 December 2017 17	1. FC Köln	1–0	VfL Wolfsburg	Cologne
15:30 CET (UTC+1)	Clemens 67'	Report		Stadium: RheinEnergieStadion; Attendance: 41,100; Referee: Benjamin Brand

14 January 2018 18	1. FC Köln	2–1	Borussia Mönchengladbach	Cologne
15:30 CET (UTC+1)	Sørensen 34'; Terodde 90+5'	Report	Raffael 69'	Stadium: RheinEnergieStadion; Attendance: 50,000; Referee: Felix Zwayer

20 January 2018 19	Hamburger SV	0–2	1. FC Köln	Hamburg
18:30 CET (UTC+1)		Report	Terodde 27', 67'	Stadium: Volksparkstadion; Attendance: 52,674; Referee: Guido Winkmann

27 January 2018 20	1. FC Köln	1–1	FC Augsburg	Cologne
15:30 CET (UTC+1)	Jojić 40'	Report	Caiuby 77'	Stadium: RheinEnergieStadion; Attendance: 49,900; Referee: Christian Dingert

2 February 2018 21	1. FC Köln	2–3	Borussia Dortmund	Cologne
20:30 CET (UTC+1)	Zoller 60'; Meré 69'	Report	Batshuayi 35', 62'; Schürrle 84'	Stadium: RheinEnergieStadion; Attendance: 50,000; Referee: Benjamin Brand

10 February 2018 22	Eintracht Frankfurt	4–2	1. FC Köln	Frankfurt
15:30 CET (UTC+1)	Rebić 15'; Russ 59'; Falette 65'; Wolf 67'	Report	Terodde 57' (pen.), 74'	Stadium: Commerzbank-Arena; Attendance: 47,700; Referee: Daniel Siebert

17 February 2018 23	1. FC Köln	1–1	Hannover 96	Cologne
15:30 CET (UTC+1)	Osako 29'	Report	Füllkrug 37'	Stadium: RheinEnergieStadion; Attendance: 48,400; Referee: Markus Schmidt

25 February 2018 24	RB Leipzig	1–2	1. FC Köln	Leipzig
18:00 CET (UTC+1)	Augustin 5'	Report	Koziello 70'; Bittencourt 77'	Stadium: Red Bull Arena; Attendance: 31,793; Referee: Harm Osmers

4 March 2018 25	1. FC Köln	2–3	VfB Stuttgart	Cologne
15:30 CET (UTC+1)	Pizarro 7'; Jojić 86'	Report	Gómez 45', 45+2'; Beck 57'	Stadium: RheinEnergieStadion; Attendance: 50,000; Referee: Sören Storks

12 March 2018 26	Werder Bremen	3–1	1. FC Köln	Bremen
20:30 CET (UTC+1)	Veljković 33'; Rashica 58'; M. Eggestein 90'	Report	Osako 53'	Stadium: Weser-Stadion; Attendance: 41,100; Referee: Benjamin Brand

18 March 2018 27	1. FC Köln	2–0	Bayer Leverkusen	Cologne
15:30 CET (UTC+1)	Osako 9'; Zoller 69'	Report		Stadium: RheinEnergieStadion; Attendance: 50,000; Referee: Harm Osmers

31 March 2018 28	1899 Hoffenheim	6–0	1. FC Köln	Sinsheim
15:30 CEST (UTC+2)	Gnabry 22', 47'; Uth 56', 65'; Rupp 61'; Zuber 72'	Report		Stadium: Wirsol Rhein-Neckar-Arena; Attendance: 30,150; Referee: Robert Hartmann

7 April 2018 29	1. FC Köln	1–1	Mainz 05	Cologne
15:30 CEST (UTC+2)	Hector 7'	Report	De Blasis 50'	Stadium: RheinEnergieStadion; Attendance: 50,000; Referee: Benjamin Cortus

14 April 2018 30	Hertha BSC	2–1	1. FC Köln	Berlin
15:30 CEST (UTC+2)	Selke 49', 52'	Report	Bittencourt 29'	Stadium: Olympiastadion Berlin; Attendance: 49,253; Referee: Sören Storks

22 April 2018 31	1. FC Köln	2–2	Schalke 04	Cologne
18:00 CEST (UTC+2)	Bittencourt 26'; Risse 83'	Report	Embolo 4'; Konoplyanka 23'	Stadium: RheinEnergieStadion; Attendance: 50,000; Referee: Marco Fritz

28 April 2018 32	SC Freiburg	3–2	1. FC Köln	Freiburg
15:30 CEST (UTC+2)	Petersen 14', 52'; Höler 90+2'	Report	Bittencourt 82', 87'	Stadium: Schwarzwald-Stadion; Attendance: 24,000; Referee: Deniz Aytekin

5 May 2018 33	1. FC Köln	1–3	Bayern Munich	Cologne
15:30 CEST (UTC+2)	Süle 30' (o.g.)	Report	Rodríguez 59'; Lewandowski 61'; Tolisso 78'	Stadium: RheinEnergieStadion; Attendance: 50,000; Referee: Bibiana Steinhaus

12 May 2018 34	VfL Wolfsburg	4–1	1. FC Köln	Wolfsburg
15:30 CEST (UTC+2)	Guilavogui 1'; Origi 54'; Knoche 71'; Brekalo 90+1'	Report	Hector 32'	Stadium: Volkswagen Arena; Attendance: 26,112; Referee: Markus Schmidt

=== DFB-Pokal ===
12 August 2017 First round	Leher TS	0–5	1. FC Köln	Bremerhaven
15:30 CEST (UTC+2)		Report	Bittencourt 28'; Sørensen 34'; Córdoba 50' (pen.); Zoller 69'; Guirassy 74'	Stadium: Nordsee-Stadion; Attendance: 8,119; Referee: René Rohde

25 October 2017 Second round	Hertha BSC	1–3	1. FC Köln	Berlin
18:30 CEST (UTC+2)	Stark 69'	Report	Zoller 35'; Maroh 43'; Clemens 64'	Stadium: Olympiastadion; Attendance: 33,459; Referee: Marco Fritz

19 December 2017 Round of 16	Schalke 04	1–0	1. FC Köln	Gelsenkirchen
20:45 CET (UTC+1)	Meyer 63'	Report		Stadium: Veltins-Arena; Attendance: 56,392; Referee: Robert Hartmann

=== UEFA Europa League ===
==== Group stage ====
Pos	Team	Pld	W	D	L	GF	GA	GD	Pts	Qualification	ARS	ZVE	KLN	BATE
1	(England) Arsenal	6	4	1	1	14	4	+10	13	Advance to knockout phase	—	0–0	3–1	6–0
2	(Serbia) Red Star Belgrade	6	2	3	1	3	2	+1	9	Advance to knockout phase	0–1	—	1–0	1–1
3	(Germany) 1. FC Köln	6	2	0	4	7	8	−1	6		1–0	0–1	—	5–2
4	(Belarus) BATE Borisov	6	1	2	3	6	16	−10	5		2–4	0–0	1–0	—

Source: UEFA
Rules for classification: Group stage tiebreakers

14 September 2017 1	Arsenal (England)	3–1	(Germany) 1. FC Köln	London, England
21:05 BST (UTC+1); 22:05 CEST (UTC+2)	Kolašinac 49'; Sánchez 67'; Bellerín 82'	Report	Córdoba 9'	Stadium: Emirates Stadium; Attendance: 59,359; Referee: Xavier Estrada Fernández (Spain)
Note: The match, originally scheduled for 21:05 CEST, was delayed to 22:05 CEST due to crowd safety concerns.

28 September 2017 2	1. FC Köln (Germany)	0–1	(Serbia) Red Star Belgrade	Cologne, Germany
19:00 CEST (UTC+2)		Report	Boakye 30'	Stadium: RheinEnergieStadion; Attendance: 46,195; Referee: Bas Nijhuis (Netherlands)

19 October 2017 3	BATE Borisov (Belarus)	1–0	(Germany) 1. FC Köln	Barysaw, Belarus
20:00 FET (UTC+3); 19:00 CEST (UTC+2)	Rios 55'	Report		Stadium: Borisov Arena; Attendance: 11,783; Referee: Hüseyin Göçek (Turkey)

2 November 2017 4	1. FC Köln (Germany)	5–2	(Belarus) BATE Borisov	Cologne, Germany
21:05 CET (UTC+1)	Zoller 16'; Osako 54', 82'; Guirassy 63'; Jojić 90'	Report	Milunović 31'; Signevich 33'	Stadium: RheinEnergieStadion; Attendance: 45,200; Referee: Aleksandar Stavrev (Macedonia)

23 November 2017 5	1. FC Köln (Germany)	1–0	(England) Arsenal	Cologne, Germany
19:00 CET (UTC+1)	Guirassy 62' (pen.)	Report		Stadium: RheinEnergieStadion; Attendance: 45,300; Referee: Vladislav Bezborodov (Russia)

7 December 2017 6	Red Star Belgrade (Serbia)	1–0	(Germany) 1. FC Köln	Belgrade, Serbia
21:05 CET (UTC+1)	Srnić 22'	Report		Stadium: Red Star Stadium; Attendance: 51,364; Referee: Bobby Madden (Scotland)

== Statistics ==
=== Appearances and goals ===
As of 5 May 2018

No.	Pos	Player	Bundesliga		DFB-Pokal		Europa League		Total	
No.	Pos	Player	Apps	Goals	Apps	Goals	Apps	Goals	Apps	Goals
1	GK	(Germany) Timo Horn	33	0	3	0	6	0	42	0
2	DF	(Germany) Kevin Goden	0	0	0+1	0	0	0	1	0
3	DF	(Germany) Dominique Heintz	30	1	3	0	4	0	37	1
4	DF	(Denmark) Frederik Sørensen	24+4	2	3	1	4	0	35	3
5	DF	(Slovenia) Dominic Maroh	10+1	0	1	1	3	0	15	1
6	MF	(Germany) Marco Höger	19+3	0	0+1	0	2	0	25	0
7	MF	(Germany) Marcel Risse	12+3	1	1	0	0+1	0	17	1
8	MF	(Serbia) Miloš Jojić	16+8	2	3	0	4+2	1	33	3
9	FW	(Germany) Simon Terodde	13+1	5	0	0	0	0	14	5
11	FW	(Germany) Simon Zoller	12+5	2	1+1	2	3	1	22	5
13	FW	(Japan) Yuya Osako	23+1	4	0+1	0	3+3	2	31	6
14	DF	(Germany) Jonas Hector	19	1	1	0	1	0	21	1
15	FW	(Colombia) Jhon Córdoba	9+9	0	1	1	3	1	22	2
16	DF	(Poland) Paweł Olkowski	5	0	1	0	3+2	0	11	0
17	MF	(Germany) Christian Clemens	6+7	1	0+2	1	3+1	0	19	2
18	GK	(Germany) Thomas Kessler	0	0	0	0	0	0	0	0
19	FW	(France) Serhou Guirassy	8+7	4	1+1	1	4+1	2	22	7
20	MF	(Germany) Salih Özcan	19+4	0	2	0	5	0	30	0
21	MF	(Germany) Leonardo Bittencourt	17+4	5	2	1	2+2	0	27	6
22	DF	(Spain) Jorge Meré	20+1	1	1	0	3	0	25	1
23	DF	(Germany) Jannes Horn	9+1	0	2	0	2	0	14	0
24	DF	(Germany) Lukas Klünter	14+5	1	2	0	2+1	0	24	1
25	DF	(Portugal) João Queirós	0	0	0	0	0	0	0	0
26	MF	(Germany) Chris Führich	1+1	0	1	0	0	0	3	0
27	DF	(Serbia) Filip Kusić	0+1	0	0	0	0	0	1	0
29	DF	(Germany) Tim Handwerker	3+8	0	1	0	0	0	12	0
33	MF	(Germany) Matthias Lehmann	17+3	0	2	0	4+1	0	27	0
35	GK	(Germany) Sven Müller	0	0	0	0	0	0	0	0
37	MF	(Germany) Anas Ouahim	0+1	0	0	0	0+1	0	2	0
38	MF	(Denmark) Nikolas Nartey	0+1	0	0	0	0	0	1	0
39	FW	(Peru) Claudio Pizarro	4+11	1	0	0	0	0	15	1
40	DF	(Germany) Yann Aurel Bisseck	1+2	0	0	0	0	0	3	0
41	MF	(France) Vincent Koziello	7+4	1	0	0	0	0	11	1
Players transferred out during the season
9	FW	(Latvia) Artjoms Rudņevs	0	0	0+1	0	0	0	1	0
34	DF	(Russia) Konstantin Rausch	11+1	0	1	0	5+1	0	19	0

=== Goalscorers ===
As of 5 May 2018

Rank	Position	Name	Bundesliga	DFB-Pokal	Europa League	Total
1	FW	(France) Serhou Guirassy	4	1	2	7
2	MF	(Germany) Leonardo Bittencourt	5	1	0	6
2	FW	(Japan) Yuya Osako	4	0	2	6
4	FW	(Germany) Simon Terodde	5	0	0	5
4	FW	(Germany) Simon Zoller	2	2	1	5
6	MF	(Serbia) Miloš Jojić	2	0	1	3
6	DF	(Denmark) Frederik Sørensen	2	1	0	3
8	MF	(Germany) Christian Clemens	1	1	0	2
8	FW	(Colombia) Jhon Córdoba	0	1	1	2
10	DF	(Germany) Jonas Hector	1	0	0	1
10	DF	(Germany) Dominique Heintz	1	0	0	1
10	DF	(Germany) Lukas Klünter	1	0	0	1
10	MF	(France) Vincent Koziello	1	0	0	1
10	DF	(Slovenia) Dominic Maroh	0	1	0	1
10	DF	(Spain) Jorge Meré	1	0	0	1
10	FW	(Peru) Claudio Pizarro	1	0	0	1
10	MF	(Germany) Marcel Risse	1	0	0	1
Total			34	8	7	49

=== Clean sheets ===
As of 5 May 2018

Rank	Name	Bundesliga	DFB-Pokal	Europa League	Total
1	(Germany) Timo Horn	5	1	1	7
Total		5	1	1	7

=== Disciplinary record ===
As of 5 May 2018

Rank	Position	Name	Bundesliga			DFB-Pokal			Europa League			Total		
Rank	Position	Name	Booked	(yellow card) (yellow-red card)	Sent off (straight red)	Booked	(yellow card) (yellow-red card)	Sent off (straight red)	Booked	(yellow card) (yellow-red card)	Sent off (straight red)	Booked	(yellow card) (yellow-red card)	Sent off (straight red)
1	DF	(Denmark) Frederik Sørensen	9	0	0	0	0	0	2	0	0	11	0	0
2	DF	(Germany) Lukas Klünter	6	0	0	0	0	0	1	0	0	7	0	0
3	MF	(Germany) Salih Özcan	5	0	0	1	0	0	0	0	0	6	0	0
3	MF	(Spain) Jorge Meré	5	0	0	1	0	0	0	0	0	6	0	0
5	MF	(Serbia) Miloš Jojić	3	0	0	2	0	0	1	0	0	5	0	0
5	MF	(Germany) Matthias Lehmann	3	0	0	1	0	0	1	0	0	5	0	0
7	MF	(Germany) Leonardo Bittencourt	4	0	0	0	0	0	0	0	0	4	0	0
7	FW	(France) Serhou Guirassy	2	0	0	0	0	0	2	0	0	4	0	0
7	MF	(Germany) Marco Höger	4	0	0	0	0	0	0	0	0	4	0	0
10	FW	(Japan) Yuya Osako	3	1	0	0	0	0	0	0	0	3	1	0
10	DF	(Germany) Jonas Hector	3	0	0	0	0	0	0	0	0	3	0	0
10	DF	(Germany) Dominique Heintz	3	0	0	0	0	0	0	0	0	3	0	0
10	DF	(Russia) Konstantin Rausch	3	0	0	0	0	0	0	0	0	3	0	0
10	FW	(Germany) Simon Zoller	3	0	0	0	0	0	0	0	0	3	0	0
15	DF	(Poland) Paweł Olkowski	1	0	0	0	0	0	1	0	0	2	0	0
15	MF	(Germany) Christian Clemens	2	0	0	0	0	0	0	0	0	2	0	0
15	MF	(France) Vincent Koziello	2	0	0	0	0	0	0	0	0	2	0	0
15	MF	(Germany) Marcel Risse	2	0	0	0	0	0	0	0	0	2	0	0
15	MF	(Germany) Simon Terodde	2	0	0	0	0	0	0	0	0	2	0	0
20	FW	(Colombia) Jhon Córdoba	1	0	0	0	0	0	0	0	0	1	0	0
20	GK	(Germany) Timo Horn	0	0	0	0	0	0	1	0	0	1	0	0
20	DF	(Slovenia) Dominic Maroh	0	0	0	0	0	0	1	0	0	1	0	0
Total			63	1	0	5	0	0	10	0	0	81	1	0
