= Thomas Kessler (footballer) =

German footballer (born 1986)

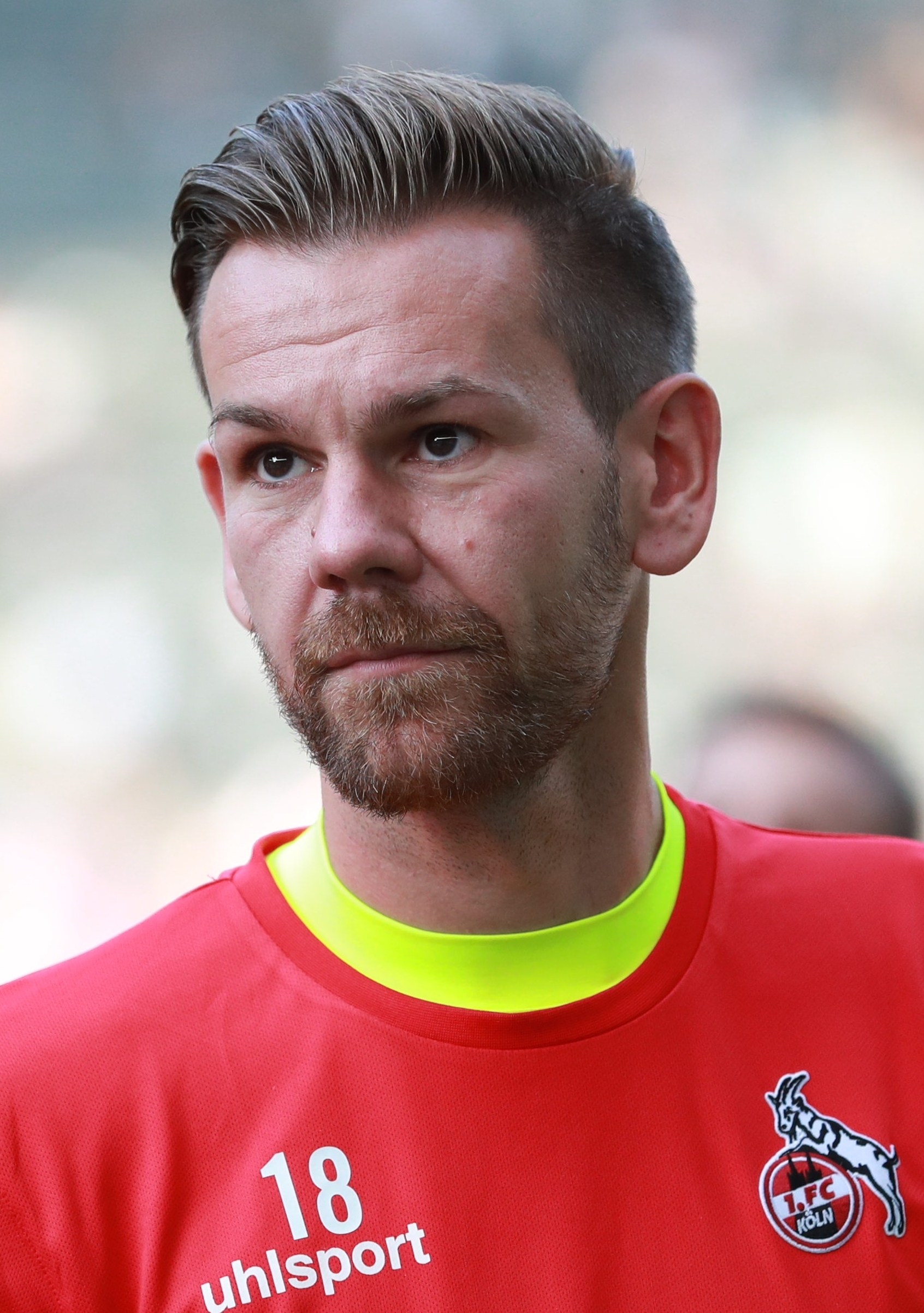
- Kessler in 2018

Personal information
- Date of birth: 20 January 1986 (age 40)
- Place of birth: Cologne, West Germany
- Height: 1.97 m (6 ft 6 in)
- Position: Goalkeeper

Team information
- Current team: 1. FC Köln (Director of football)

Youth career
- 1996–2000: Grün-Weiß Brauweiler
- 2000–2004: 1. FC Köln

Senior career*
Years	Team	Apps	(Gls)
2004–2020	1. FC Köln II	50	(0)
2007–2020	1. FC Köln	30	(0)
2010–2011	→ FC St. Pauli (loan)	26	(0)
2011–2012	→ Eintracht Frankfurt (loan)	4	(0)
Total		110	(0)

International career
2002	Germany U16	1	(0)

Managerial career
- 2021–: 1. FC Köln (Director of football)
- * Club domestic league appearances and goals

Thomas Kessler (born 20 January 1986) is a German former professional footballer who played as a goalkeeper. He is currently the director of football at 1. FC Köln.

== Club career ==
Kessler was born in Cologne and moved from Grün-Weiß Brauweiler to 1. FC Köln in 2000 at the age of 14, where he came through the clubs academy, all the way up to the first and second teams. In 2007, he became a permanent part of the clubs first team squad, after training with the team during a training camp in the winter break. At the same time, he also signed his first contract with the club. He made his debut for 1. FC Köln in the 2006–07 season in the 2. Bundesliga against Kickers Offenbach on May 13, 2007, after replacing Stefan Wessels who broke a rib in that game.

Kessler joined Bundesliga club FC St. Pauli on loan in June 2010 for two years. On 12 September 2010, he made his debut for FC St. Pauli in a league fixture against his former club, in Cologne. However, when FC St. Pauli's relegation became apparent, he exercised a contract option that allowed him to opt out of his contract after one year. He was then loaned out to relegated Bundesliga side Eintracht Frankfurt for the 2011/12 season.

After Frankfurt were promoted back to the Bundesliga, Kessler returned to 1. FC Köln, who had been relegated to the 2. Bundesliga, but whose sporting management had already decided to count on Timo Horn as their first choice well before the start of the 2012/13 season. Horn was injured during the 2016/17 Bundesliga season, which is why Kessler played 13 consecutive games in goal for Köln in that season. In May 2019, Kessler signed a new contract until June 2020. After the contract expired, Cologne offered Kessler to stay at the club in another management position, but also announced that they would not offer him a new contract as a player.

After the 2019/20 season, Kessler began a 24-month trainee program following. After Horst Heldt left Köln in June 2021, Kessler was named the new head of the clubs professional department. In May 2023, Kessler extended his contract with Köln.

== International career ==
Kessler represented the Germany national under-16 football team once in 2002.

== Career statistics ==
Appearances and goals by club, season and competition
Club	Season	League			Cup		Europe		Total	
Club	Season	Division	Apps	Goals	Apps	Goals	Apps	Goals	Apps	Goals
1. FC Köln II	2004–05	Regionalliga Nord	2	0	0	0	—		2	0
1. FC Köln II	2005–06	Regionalliga Nord	7	0	1	0	—		8	0
1. FC Köln II	2006–07	Oberliga Nordrhein	13	0	—		—		13	0
1. FC Köln II	2007–08	Oberliga Nordrhein	17	0	—		—		17	0
1. FC Köln II	2008–09	Regionalliga West	6	0	—		—		6	0
1. FC Köln II	2012–13	Regionalliga West	4	0	—		—		6	0
1. FC Köln II	2014–15	Regionalliga West	1	0	—		—		6	0
1. FC Köln II	Total		50	0	1	0	—		51	0
1. FC Köln	2006–07	2. Bundesliga	2	0	—		—		2	0
1. FC Köln	2007–08	2. Bundesliga	4	0	0	0	—		4	0
1. FC Köln	2008–09	Bundesliga	3	0	0	0	—		3	0
1. FC Köln	2009–10	Bundesliga	2	0	0	0	—		42	0
1. FC Köln	2012–13	2. Bundesliga	1	0	1	0	—		2	0
1. FC Köln	2013–14	2. Bundesliga	2	0	0	0	—		2	0
1. FC Köln	2014–15	Bundesliga	1	0	0	0	—		1	0
1. FC Köln	2015–16	Bundesliga	1	0	0	0	—		1	0
1. FC Köln	2016–17	Bundesliga	13	0	1	0	—		14	0
1. FC Köln	2017–18	Bundesliga	0	0	0	0	0	0	0	0
1. FC Köln	2018–19	2. Bundesliga	1	0	0	0	—		1	0
1. FC Köln	2019–20	Bundesliga	0	0	0	0	—		0	0
1. FC Köln	Total		30	0	2	0	—		32	0
FC St. Pauli (loan)	2010–11	Bundesliga	26	0	0	0	—		26	0
Eintracht Frankfurt (loan)	2011–12	2. Bundesliga	4	0	0	0	—		4	0
Career total			110	0	3	0	0	0	113	0
