= Jerome Propheter =

German footballer

Personal information
- Date of birth: 4 June 1990 (age 36)
- Place of birth: Cologne, West Germany
- Height: 1.92 m (6 ft 4 in)
- Position: Centre back

Team information
- Current team: FC Teutonia Weiden
- Number: 20

Youth career
- SpVgg Porz-Gremberghoven
- SV Deutz 05
- SCB Viktoria Köln

Senior career*
Years	Team	Apps	(Gls)
2008–2011	FC Junkersdorf		
2011–2013	Viktoria Köln	30	(4)
2013–2015	Arminia Bielefeld	2	(0)
2014	→ Rot-Weiss Essen (loan)	16	(0)
2015–2017	Alemannia Aachen	58	(4)
2017–2019	Wacker Nordhausen	43	(4)
2019–2023	Rot-Weiß Oberhausen	114	(5)
2023–	FC Teutonia Weiden	28	(0)
- * Club domestic league appearances and goals as of 20 May 2024

Jerome Propheter (born 4 June 1990) is a German footballer who plays as a defender for Mittelrheinliga club FC Teutonia Weiden.

== Club career ==
=== FC Junkersdorf ===
In 2008, Propheter joined local club FC Jukersdorf. He left them in 2011.

=== Viktoria Köln ===
In 2011, he joined Regionalliga West and home city side, Viktoria Köln. He made his debut on 19 August 2012 in 4-2 home win over FC Schalke 04 II. Propheter scored his first ever goal in 0-3 away win over Borussia Mönchengladbach II on 22 September 2012, scoring in the 74th minute.

=== Arminia Bielefeld ===
On 1 July 2013, Propheter successfully joined 3. Liga side Arminia Bielefeld on a free transfer. His debut came over a year later in August 2014, coming on for Julian Börner in the 85th minute against MSV Duisburg.

=== Rot-Weiss Essen ===
On 18 January 2014, Propheter completed a loan move to Rot-Weiss Essen that lasted 5 months. His debut several days later 2-3 home loss to SC Wiedenbrück 2000. His first goal came in a 4-0 win over SSVg Velbert. On 30 June 2014, he returned to Arminia Bielefeld.

=== Alemannia Aachen ===
On 1 July 2015, Propheter signed for Regionalliga West side Alemannia Aachen.
