= Leonardo Bittencourt =

German footballer (born 1993)

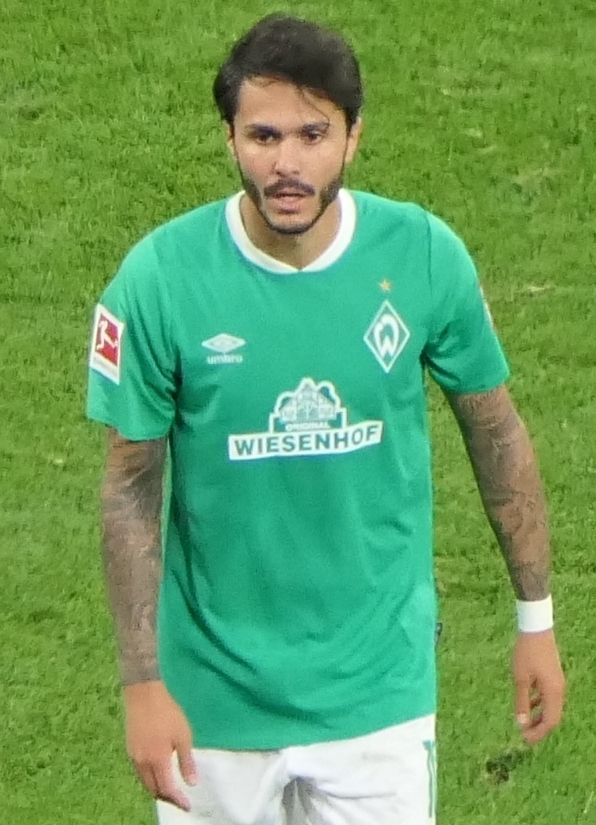
- Bittencourt with Werder Bremen in 2019

Personal information
- Full name: Leonardo Jesus Loureiro Bittencourt
- Date of birth: 19 December 1993 (age 32)
- Place of birth: Leipzig, Germany
- Height: 1.71 m (5 ft 7 in)
- Position: Midfielder

Team information
- Current team: Energie Cottbus
- Number: 32

Youth career
- 2005–2010: Energie Cottbus

Senior career*
Years	Team	Apps	(Gls)
2010–2012	Energie Cottbus II	4	(2)
2010–2012	Energie Cottbus	29	(2)
2012–2013	Borussia Dortmund II	12	(1)
2012–2013	Borussia Dortmund	5	(1)
2013–2015	Hannover 96	57	(5)
2015–2018	1. FC Köln	67	(11)
2018–2020	1899 Hoffenheim	22	(1)
2019–2020	→ Werder Bremen (loan)	28	(4)
2020–2026	Werder Bremen	147	(12)
2026–	Energie Cottbus	0	(0)

International career
2011	Germany U19	2	(0)
2012–2015	Germany U21	20	(3)
- * Club domestic league appearances and goals as of 16 May 2026 (UTC)

Leonardo Jesus Loureiro Bittencourt (born 19 December 1993) is a German professional footballer who plays as a midfielder for 2. Bundesliga club Energie Cottbus.

== Personal life ==
Bittencourt was born in Leipzig, Germany. He is the son of Franklin Bittencourt, a Brazilian former professional player who played in Germany, and is now active as a coach.

== Club career ==
Bittencourt began his career with Energie Cottbus. On 1 December 2011, it was announced that Bittencourt had signed a four-year contract with Borussia Dortmund, effective from 1 July 2012. He moved to Hannover 96 at the end of the 2012–13 season.

On 13 July 2015, Bittencourt joined 1. FC Köln on a four-year deal keeping him at the club until 2019.

On 28 April 2018, he played as Köln lost 3–2 to SC Freiburg which confirmed Köln's relegation from the Bundesliga. After the team's relegation, Bittencourt was transferred to TSG 1899 Hoffenheim for a fee of €6 million.

On 2 September 2019, Werder Bremen announced the signing of Bittencourt on a season-long loan deal. It was reported the transfer included an obligation for Werder Bremen to sign him permanently for an estimated transfer fee of €7 million. The obligation took effect in July 2020.

== International career ==
Bittencourt has represented Germany's youth teams, under 19 and under 21. He was first called up to under 21 in 2012, for the friendly against Turkey on 14 November 2012.

== Career statistics ==
As of match played 16 May 2026

Appearances and goals by club, season and competition
Club	Season	League			DFB-Pokal		Continental		Other		Total	
Club	Season	Division	Apps	Goals	Apps	Goals	Apps	Goals	Apps	Goals	Apps	Goals
Energie Cottbus II	2010–11	Regionalliga Nord	4	2	–		–		–		4	2
Energie Cottbus	2010–11	2. Bundesliga	3	0	0	0	–		–		3	0
Energie Cottbus	2011–12	2. Bundesliga	26	2	1	0	–		–		27	2
Energie Cottbus	Total		29	2	1	0	0	0	0	0	30	2
Borussia Dortmund II	2012–13	3. Liga	12	1	0	0	–		–		12	1
Borussia Dortmund	2012–13	Bundesliga	5	1	1	0	1 (Note: Appearance(s) in UEFA Champions League)	0	–		7	1
Hannover 96	2013–14	2. Bundesliga	31	4	2	0	–		–		33	4
Hannover 96	2014–15	2. Bundesliga	26	1	2	0	–		–		28	1
Hannover 96	Total		57	5	4	0	0	0	0	0	61	5
1. FC Köln	2015–16	Bundesliga	29	3	1	0	–		–		30	3
1. FC Köln	2016–17	Bundesliga	16	3	2	0	–		–		18	3
1. FC Köln	2017–18	Bundesliga	22	5	2	1	4 (Note: Appearances in UEFA Europa League)	0	–		28	6
1. FC Köln	Total		67	11	5	1	4	0	0	0	76	12
1899 Hoffenheim	2018–19	Bundesliga	21	1	2	0	3	0	–		26	1
1899 Hoffenheim	2019–20	Bundesliga	1	0	0	0	–		–		1	0
1899 Hoffenheim	Total		22	1	2	0	3	0	0	0	27	1
Werder Bremen (loan)	2019–20	Bundesliga	28	4	3	2	–		1 (Note: Appearance in Bundesliga relegation play-offs)	0	32	6
Werder Bremen	2020–21	Bundesliga	27	4	2	1	–		–		29	5
Werder Bremen	2021–22	2. Bundesliga	22	2	0	0	–		0	0	22	2
Werder Bremen	2022–23	Bundesliga	25	3	2	1	–		–		27	4
Werder Bremen	2023–24	Bundesliga	29	1	1	0	–		–		30	1
Werder Bremen	2024–25	Bundesliga	27	2	4	0	—		—		31	2
Werder Bremen	2025–26	Bundesliga	17	0	1	0	—		—		18	0
Werder Bremen	Total		147	12	10	2	0	0	0	0	157	14
Career total			371	39	26	5	8	0	1	0	406	44
