= Timo Horn =

German footballer (born 1993)

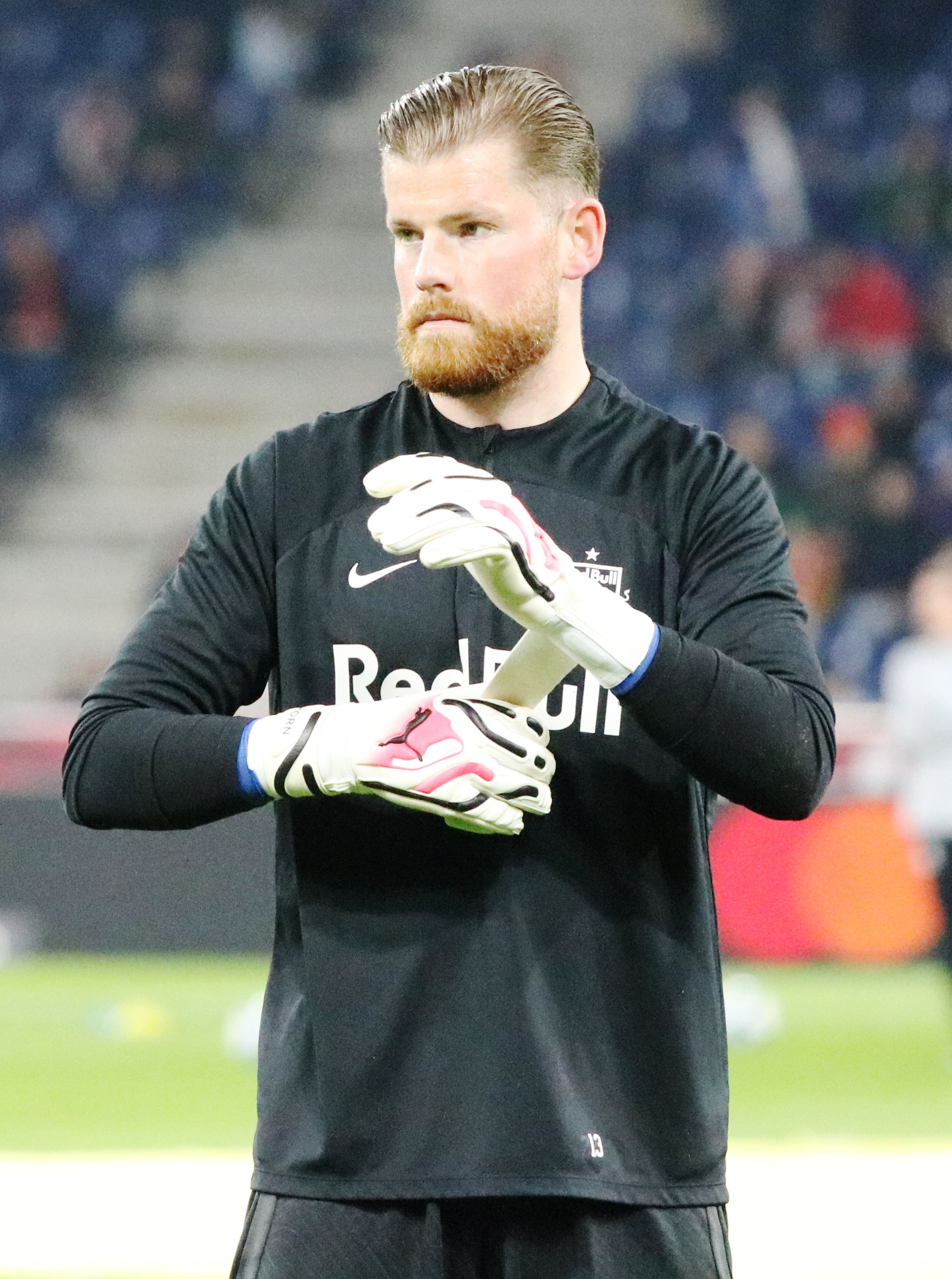
- Horn with FC Red Bull Salzburg in 2024

Personal information
- Full name: Timo Phil Horn
- Date of birth: 12 May 1993 (age 33)
- Place of birth: Cologne, Germany
- Height: 1.92 m (6 ft 4 in)
- Position: Goalkeeper

Team information
- Current team: VfL Bochum
- Number: 1

Youth career
- 1999–2002: SC Rondorf
- 2002–2010: 1. FC Köln

Senior career*
Years	Team	Apps	(Gls)
2010–2012	1. FC Köln II	29	(0)
2012–2023	1. FC Köln	299	(0)
2024	Red Bull Salzburg	3	(0)
2024–	VfL Bochum	50	(0)

International career
2007–2008	Germany U15	1	(0)
2008–2009	Germany U16	5	(0)
2009–2010	Germany U17	11	(0)
2010–2011	Germany U18	5	(0)
2011–2012	Germany U19	5	(0)
2012–2013	Germany U20	2	(0)
2013–2015	Germany U21	4	(0)
2016	Germany U23	6	(0)
Medal record
Men's football
Representing Germany
Olympic Games
Silver medal – second place	2016 Rio de Janeiro	Team
- * Club domestic league appearances and goals as of 28 August 2026

Timo Phil Horn (born 12 May 1993) is a German professional footballer who plays as a goalkeeper for 2. Bundesliga club VfL Bochum. He began his professional career with 1. FC Köln, where he spent over a decade as the club's first-choice goalkeeper and made more than 300 appearances. After leaving Köln in 2023, he had a brief spell with Red Bull Salzburg before returning to Germany with VfL Bochum in 2024.

At international level, Horn represented Germany at youth level and was part of the squad that won the silver medal at the 2016 Summer Olympics.

== Club career ==
=== Youth career ===
Horn started his youth career at SC Rondorf and joined 1. FC Köln, a club he supported, in 2002. At the age of 15, he rejected Liverpool. He was on both the senior and reserve team squads for both the 2010–11 and 2011–12 seasons. However, Horn only made appearances for the reserve squad in those two seasons.

=== 1. FC Köln ===
Upon Köln's relegation to the 2. Bundesliga following the 2011–12 season, their top two keepers, Michael Rensing and Miro Varvodić, were released from the club, allowing Horn to become the team's first choice goalkeeper entering the 2012–13 season, receiving a vote of confidence from ex-caretaker manager Frank Schaefer.

Köln proceeded to spend two seasons in the 2. Bundesliga, finishing 5th in 2012–13, and 1st the following year, earning a promotion back to the Bundesliga. Horn started all but three games in net over those two seasons, finishing with 27 combined clean sheets, including a league-leading 16 in 2013–14. As a team, Köln gave up merely 20 goals during the season, well ahead of the next fewest FC Ingolstadt, who allowed 33. Following the season, Horn was voted by Köln fans as the Player of the Season.

Horn made his Bundesliga debut against Hamburger SV on 23 August 2014, recording a clean sheet. In fact, Horn began his Bundesliga career by not allowing a goal in his first four matches, a feat previously never accomplished. On 19 December 2014, Horn signed a contract extension to stay at Köln until 2019, citing his childhood dream of playing for Köln in the Bundesliga as a hometown player.

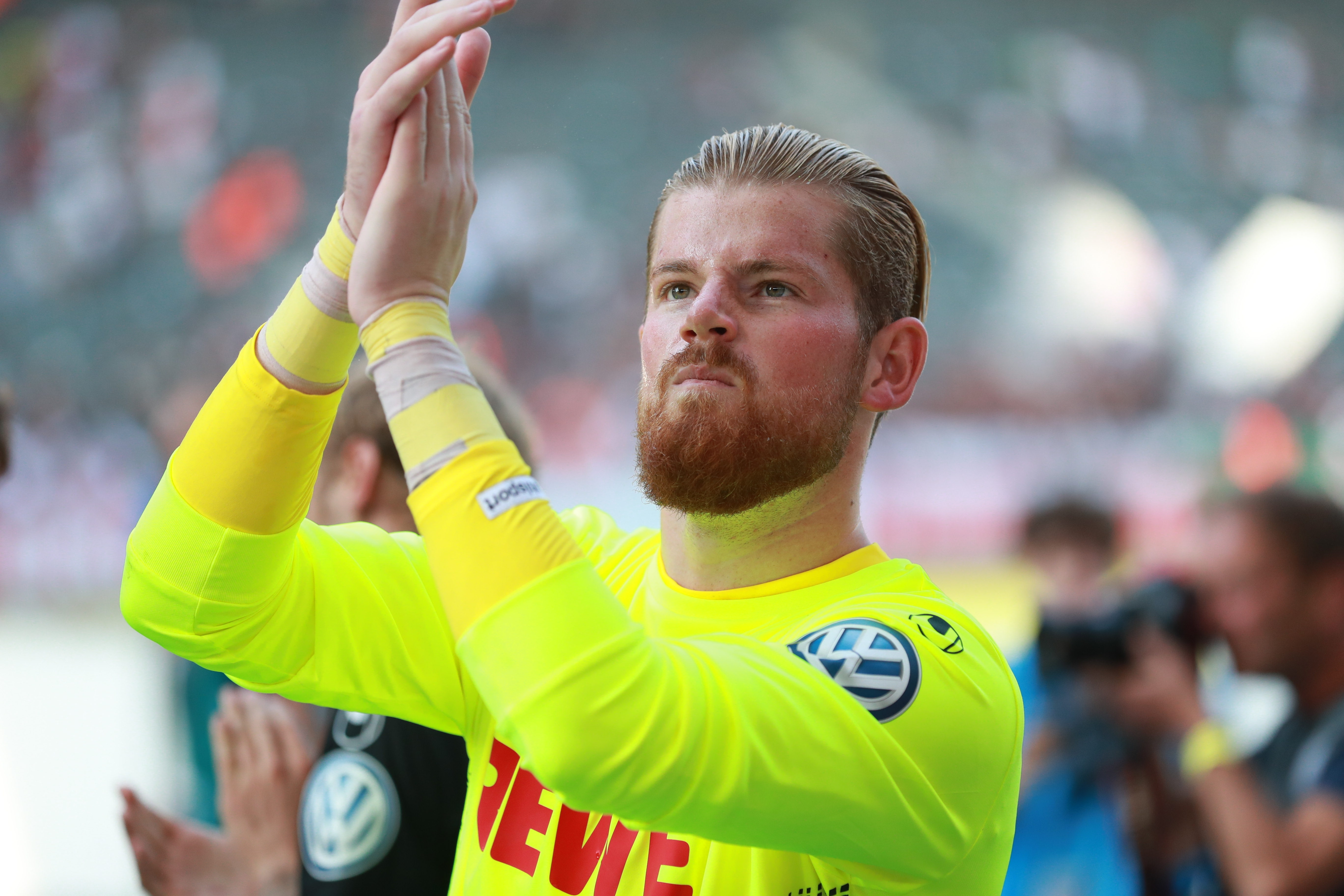
Horn with Köln in 2018

Following the 2015–16 season, Horn was once again voted as the team's Player of the Season. Making 33 starts, Horn recorded 8 clean sheets while giving up 40 goals.

On 8 April 2018, Horn signed a contract extension with Köln, keeping him at the club until 2022. He left Köln in July 2023, having spent 21 years at the club.

=== Red Bull Salzburg ===
On 6 January 2024, Horn joined Austrian Bundesliga club Red Bull Salzburg on a six-month contract. However, he was unable to displace Alexander Schlager as Salzburg's first-choice goalkeeper and made only three Bundesliga appearances late in the season after Schlager sustained an injury. Salzburg finished as runners-up for the first time since 2013. Following the expiration of his contract, Horn left the club at the end of the 2023–24 season.

=== VfL Bochum ===
After the expiration of his contract with Red Bull Salzburg, Horn returned to Germany, signing with Bundesliga club VfL Bochum on 2 August 2024. Initially serving as a backup to Patrick Drewes, he made his competitive debut on 15 February 2025, keeping a clean sheet in a 2–0 victory over Borussia Dortmund after Drewes was sidelined with illness. Following his performance, manager Dieter Hecking promoted Horn to the starting role, keeping him in goal even after Drewes' return. On 1 March, Horn made a critical error in a 1–0 defeat to TSG Hoffenheim, but recovered with a standout performance a week later, playing a key role in Bochum's 3–2 away victory over Bayern Munich at the Allianz Arena on 8 March. His display earned him a place in kicker's Team of the Week. Bochum finished bottom of the Bundesliga and were relegated to the 2. Bundesliga, with Horn making 13 appearances during the campaign.

Despite the club's relegation, Horn remained at Bochum for the following season. At the halfway point of the season, kicker listed him among the best goalkeepers in the 2. Bundesliga.

== International career ==
Horn was part of the squad for the 2016 Summer Olympics, where Germany won the silver medal.

== Career statistics ==
As of match played 28 August 2026

Appearances and goals by club, season and competition
Club	Season	League			Cup^{1}		Europe		Other		Total	
Club	Season	Division	Apps	Goals	Apps	Goals	Apps	Goals	Apps	Goals	Apps	Goals
1. FC Köln II	2010–11	Regionalliga West	15	0	—		—		—		15	0
1. FC Köln II	2011–12	Regionalliga West	14	0	—		—		—		14	0
1. FC Köln II	Total		29	0	—		—		—		29	0
1. FC Köln	2011–12	Bundesliga	0	0	0	0	—		—		0	0
1. FC Köln	2012–13	2. Bundesliga	33	0	2	0	—		—		35	0
1. FC Köln	2013–14	2. Bundesliga	32	0	3	0	—		—		35	0
1. FC Köln	2014–15	Bundesliga	33	0	3	0	—		—		36	0
1. FC Köln	2015–16	Bundesliga	33	0	2	0	—		—		35	0
1. FC Köln	2016–17	Bundesliga	20	0	1	0	—		—		21	0
1. FC Köln	2017–18	Bundesliga	34	0	3	0	6	0	—		43	0
1. FC Köln	2018–19	2. Bundesliga	33	0	2	0	—		—		35	0
1. FC Köln	2019–20	Bundesliga	34	0	2	0	—		—		36	0
1. FC Köln	2020–21	Bundesliga	34	0	3	0	—		2	0	39	0
1. FC Köln	2021–22	Bundesliga	13	0	0	0	—		—		13	0
1. FC Köln	2022–23	Bundesliga	0	0	1	0	0	0	—		1	0
1. FC Köln	Total		299	0	22	0	6	0	2	0	329	0
Red Bull Salzburg	2023–24	Austrian Bundesliga	3	0	0	0	—		—		3	0
VfL Bochum	2024–25	Bundesliga	13	0	—		—		—		13	0
VfL Bochum	2025–26	2. Bundesliga	34	0	3	0	—		—		37	0
VfL Bochum	2026–27	2. Bundesliga	3	0	1	0	—		—		4	0
VfL Bochum	Total		50	0	4	0	—		—		54	0
Career total			381	0	26	0	6	0	2	0	415	0

== Honours ==
1. FC Köln

- 2. Bundesliga: 2013–14, 2018–19

Germany

- Summer Olympic Games: silver medal 2016
