= 2014–15 Hertha BSC season =

Hertha BSC
2014–15 season
- Sporting Director: Michael Preetz
- Head coach: Jos Luhukay (until 4 February 2015); Pál Dárdai (interim) (from 5 February 2015)
- Stadium: Olympic Stadium, Berlin, Germany
- Bundesliga: 15th
- DFB-Pokal: Second round
- Top goalscorer: League: Julian Schieber (7 goals); All: Julian Schieber (8 goals)
- Highest home attendance: 76,197 vs. Bayern Munich, 29 November 2014
- Lowest home attendance: 34,636 vs. Bayer Leverkusen, 4 February 2015
- Average home league attendance: 50,174
Home colours	Away colours	Third colours

The 2014–15 Hertha BSC season is the 122nd season in club history.

== Background ==
=== Background information ===
Hertha BSC finished the 2013–14 Bundesliga in eleventh place, thus ensuring a place in the 2014–15 Bundesliga. Tolga Ciğerci and Jens Hegeler transferred to Hertha. Adrián Ramos and Maik Franz left Hertha. Levan Kobiashvili retired after the 2013–14 season.

On 5 February 2015, Hertha sacked Jos Luhukay, naming Pál Dárdai as replacement along with assistant Rainer Widmayer. Hertha had lost 1–0 the previous day.

=== Transfers ===
==== In ====
Pos.	Name	Age	Moving from	Type	Transfer Window	Contract ends	Transfer fee	Ref.
MF	(Norway) Per Ciljan Skjelbred	27	Hamburger SV	Transfer	Summer	2017	Undisclosed	
DF	(Netherlands) John Heitinga	30	Fulham F.C.	Transfer	Summer	2016	Free	
FW	(Ivory Coast) Salomon Kalou	29	Lille OSC	Transfer	Summer	2017	Undisclosed	
MF	(Germany) Jens Hegeler	26	Bayer Leverkusen	Transfer	Summer	2017	Undisclosed	
MF	(Switzerland) Valentin Stocker	25	FC Basel	Transfer	Summer	2018	Undisclosed	
FW	(Germany) Julian Schieber	25	Borussia Dortmund	Transfer	Summer	2018	€2,000,000	
MF	(Germany) Tolga Ciğerci	22	VfL Wolfsburg	Transfer	Summer	2017	€1,500,000	
DF	(Germany) Marvin Plattenhardt	22	1. FC Nürnberg	Transfer	Summer	2017	Undisclosed	
FW	(Japan) Genki Haraguchi	23	Urawa Red Diamonds	Transfer	Summer	2018	Undisclosed	
FW	(Netherlands) Roy Beerens	26	AZ Alkmaar	Transfer	Summer	2017	Undisclosed	

==== Out ====
Pos.	Name	Age	Moving to	Type	Transfer Window	Transfer fee	Ref.
FW	(Tunisia) Sami Allagui	28	1. FSV Mainz 05	Loan	Summer	€500,000	
FW	(Germany) Pierre-Michel Lasogga	22	Hamburger SV	Transfer	Summer	Undisclosed	
FW	(Israel) Ben Sahar	24	Willem II	Released	Summer	Free	
FW	(Colombia) Adrián Ramos	28	Borussia Dortmund	Transfer	Summer	Undisclosed	
MF	(Germany) Peer Kluge	33	Arminia Bielefeld	Released	Summer	Free	
DF	(Germany) Fabian Holland	23	SV Darmstadt 98	Loan	Summer	Undisclosed	
DF	(Georgia (country)) Levan Kobiashvili	36	Retirement	Released	Summer	—	
DF	(Germany) Maik Franz	32		Released	Summer	Free	
DF	(Germany) Felix Bastians	26		Released	Summer	Free	
FW	(Germany) Hany Mukhtar	19	Benfica	Transfer	Winter	Undisclosed	
DF	(Germany) Christoph Janker	29	FC Augsburg	Transfer	Winter		

== Friendlies ==
Win Draw Loss Postponed

Date	Kickoff^{1}	Venue	City	Opponent	Res.^{2}	Att.	Goalscorers		Ref.
Date	Kickoff^{1}	Venue	City	Opponent	Res.^{2}	Att.	Hertha BSC	Opponent	Ref.
3 July 2014	18:00	H	Berlin	DB-Auswahl	14–1	700	Ronny 1', 13'; Allagui 3', 19', 29'; Schulz 12'; Ndjeng 18'; Kauter 22'; Haraguchi 28' van den Bergh 30'; Ben-Hatira 39'; Pekarík 40'; Sahar 49', 59'	Yasin 30'	
8 July 2014	18:00	A	Berlin	Viktoria 1889 Berlin	2–1	2,674	Allagui 67'; Schieber 71'	Özcin 41'	
10 July 2014	17:00	A	Perleberg	SSV Einheit Perleberg	9–1	2,000	Schieber 2', 22', 43'; Allagui 7'; Kauter 47'; Wagner 57', 68' van den Bergh 62'; Mukhtar 67'	Fliege 5'	
15 July 2014	18:30	A	Rödinghausen	SV Rödinghausen	2–0		Allagui 4'; Wagner 17'		
18 July 2014	18:00	A	Gütersloh	Vitesse Arnhem	0–0				
24 July 2014	18:00	H	Berlin	PSV Eindhoven	1–1		Heitinga 14'	de Jong 85'	
27 July 2014	14:00	A	Karlsruhe	Karlsruher SC	1–0	7,518	Allagui 39'		
30 July 2014	19:00	A	Neuruppin	Sevilla FC	0–2	3,300		Krychowiak 52'; Muñoz 58'	
5 August 2014	18:30	A	Schladming	SV Austria Salzburg	5–0		Beerens 24', 28'; Baumjohann 37'; Schieber 53', 67'		
8 August 2014	18:00	A	Irdning	Kasımpaşa Spor Kulübü	1–1		Haraguchi 30'	Scarione 83'	
4 September 2014		H	Berlin	Chemnitzer FC	2–0		Ben-Hatira 64'; Wagner 67'		
10 October 2014	14:30	H	Berlin	FC Erzgebirge Aue	1–1	920	Wagner 83'	Diring 16'	
13 January 2015	13:00	H	Berlin	Hallescher FC	1–3	400	Stocker 42'	Gogia 25'; Aydemir 84', 87'	
16 January 2015	14:30	H	Berlin	FC Energie Cottbus	1–1	400	Heitinga 57'	Kleindienst 56'	
20 January 2015	15:00	A	Belek	BSC Young Boys	1–1 (2–4 (p))		Schieber 45'	Nuzzolo 25'	
23 January 2015		A	Belek	FC Thun	1–0		Wagner 28'		

== Bundesliga ==
=== League table ===
Pos	Team	Pld	W	D	L	GF	GA	GD	Pts	Qualification or relegation
13	Hannover 96	34	9	10	15	40	56	−16	37	
14	VfB Stuttgart	34	9	9	16	42	60	−18	36	
15	Hertha BSC	34	9	8	17	36	52	−16	35	
16	Hamburger SV (O)	34	9	8	17	25	50	−25	35	Qualification for the relegation play-offs
17	SC Freiburg (R)	34	7	13	14	36	47	−11	34	Relegation to 2. Bundesliga

Source: DFB
Rules for classification: 1) points; 2) goal difference; 3) number of goals scored
(O) Play-off winners; (R) Relegated

=== Results summary ===
Overall								Home						Away					
Pld	W	D	L	GF	GA	GD	Pts	W	D	L	GF	GA	GD	W	D	L	GF	GA	GD
34	9	8	17	36	52	−16	35	6	4	7	17	22	−5	3	4	10	19	30	−11

Last updated: 24 May 2015.
Source: Matches

=== Bundesliga fixtures & results ===
Win Draw Loss

MD	Date	Kickoff^{1}	Venue	City	Opponent	Res. F–A	Att.	Goalscorers		Table			Ref.
MD	Date	Kickoff^{1}	Venue	City	Opponent	Res. F–A	Att.	Hertha BSC	Opponent	Pos.	Pts.	GD	Ref.
1	23 August 2014	15:30	H	Berlin	Werder Bremen	2–2	59,672	Schieber 16', 47'	Lukimya 53'; Di Santo 55'	6th	1	0	
2	30 August 2014	15:30	A	Leverkusen	Bayer Leverkusen	2–4	27,819	Jedvaj 24' (o.g.); Schieber 60'; Niemeyer (yellow card) 64'	Jedvaj 50'; Spahić 62'; Brandt 74'; Bellarabi 86'	15th	1	–2	
3	13 September 2014	15:30	H	Berlin	Mainz 05	1–3	42,069	Ronny 86'	Okazaki 36', 90+1'; Allagui 70'	15th	1	–4	
4	19 September 2014	20:30	A	Freiburg	SC Freiburg	2–2	23,600	Ronny 36', 90+6'	Kempf 30'; Klaus 79'	15th	2	–4	
5	24 September 2014	20:00	H	Berlin	VfL Wolfsburg	1–0	35,847	Kalou 35'		14th	5	–3	
6	28 September 2014	15:30	A	Augsburg	FC Augsburg	0–1	28,532		Verhaegh 27'	14th	5	–4	
7	3 October 2014	20:30	H	Berlin	VfB Stuttgart	3–2	46,312	Kalou 22', 64'; Beerens 74'	Leitner 5'; Wagner 83' (o.g.)	12th	8	–3	
8	18 October 2014	18:30	A	Gelsenkirchen	Schalke 04	0–2	61,973		Huntelaar 19'; Draxler 65'	13th	8	–5	
9	25 October 2014	15:30	H	Berlin	Hamburger SV	3–0	58,768	Ben-Hatira 59', 85'; Heitinga 65'		13th	11	–2	
10	2 November 2014	17:30	A	Paderborn	SC Paderborn 07	1–3	14,630	Kalou 41'	Bakalorz 28'; Kachunga 52'; Meha 75'	13th	11	–4	
11	7 November 2014	20:30	H	Berlin	Hannover 96	0–2	39,710		Briand 44'; Kiyotake 76'	14th	11	–6	
12	22 November 2014	18:30	A	Cologne	1. FC Köln	2–1	49,200	Beerens 28'; Ndjeng 86'	Ujah 58'	13th	14	–5	
13	29 November 2014	15:30	H	Berlin	Bayern Munich	0–1	76,197		Robben 27'	13th	14	–6	
14	6 December 2014	15:30	A	Mönchengladbach	Borussia Mönchengladbach	2–3	50,190	Schieber 45'; Kalou 90+2'	Jantschke 9'; Raffael 53'; Hazard 83'	15th	14	–7	
15	13 December 2014	15:30	H	Berlin	Borussia Dortmund	1–0	75,254	Schieber 40'		13th	17	–6	
16	17 December 2014	20:00	A	Frankfurt	Eintracht Frankfurt	4–4	40,200	Brooks 21'; Ben-Hatira 33'; Schieber 37'; Niemeyer 80'	Aigner 43'; Seferovic 58'; Meier 90', 90+1'	13th	18	–6	
17	21 December 2014	15:30	H	Berlin	1899 Hoffenheim	0–5	39,604		Brooks 23' (o.g.); Salihović 26' (pen.) 39' (pen.); Schipplock 74'; Rudy 84'	13th	18	–11	
18	1 February 2015	15:20	A	Bremen	Werder Bremen	0–2	40,187		Di Santo 43', 69'	15th	18	–13	
19	4 February 2015	20:00	H	Berlin	Bayer Leverkusen	0–1	34,636		Kießling 49'	17th	18	–14	
20	7 February 2015	15:30	A	Mainz	Mainz 05	2–0	26,756	Hegeler 35' (pen.); Beerens 42'		14th	21	–12	
21	15 February 2015	15:30	H	Berlin	SC Freiburg	0–2	37,617		Klaus 14'; Philipp 52'	17th	21	–14	
22	22 February 2015	17:30	A	Wolfsburg	VfL Wolfsburg	1–2	27,683	Schieber 30'	Dost 10', 74'	17th	21	–15	
23	28 February 2015	15:30	H	Berlin	FC Augsburg	1–0	36,015	Kalou 88'		14th	24	–14	
24	6 March 2015	20:30	A	Stuttgart	VfB Stuttgart	0–0	45,420			14th	25	–14	
25	14 March 2015	15:30	H	Berlin	Schalke 04	2–2	59,156	Ben-Hatira 21'; Haraguchi 81'	Sané 40'; Matip 90'	14th	26	–14	
26	20 March 2015	20:30	A	Hamburg	Hamburger SV	1–0	53,640	Langkamp 84'		13th	29	–13	
27	5 April 2015	17:30	H	Berlin	SC Paderborn 07	2–0	44,031	Stocker 68'; Schulz 88'		11th	32	–11	
28	10 April 2015	20:30	A	Hannover	Hannover 96	1–1	46,000	Schulz 75'	Stocker 83'	12th	33	–11	
29	18 April 2015	15:30	H	Berlin	1. FC Köln	0–0	51,203			13th	34	–11	
30	25 April 2015	18:30	A	Munich	Bayern Munich	0–1	75,000		Schweinsteiger 80'	13th	34	–12	
31	3 May 2015	17:30	H	Berlin	Borussia Mönchengladbach	1–2	56,881	Stocker 13'	Kruse 11'; Traoré 85'	13th	34	–13	
32	9 May 2015	19:30	A	Dortmund	Borussia Dortmund	0–2	80,667		Subotić 9'; Durm 47'	13th	34	–15	
33	16 May 2015	15:30	H	Berlin	Eintracht Frankfurt	0–0	60,168			13th	35	–15	
34	23 May 2015	15:30	A	Hoffenheim	1899 Hoffenheim	1–2	30,150	Beerens 72'	Modeste 8'; Firmino 80'	15th	35	–16	

== DFB-Pokal ==
=== DFB-Pokal review ===
Hertha BSC were drawn against Regionalliga side FC Viktoria Köln in the first round, the match will be played in Cologne. They will play Arminia Bielefeld in the second round.

=== DFB-Pokal results ===
Win Draw Loss Postponed

RD	Date	Kickoff^{1}	Venue	City	Opponent	Result^{2}	Attendance	Goalscorers		Ref.
RD	Date	Kickoff^{1}	Venue	City	Opponent	Result^{2}	Attendance	Hertha BSC	Opponent	Ref.
Round 1	16 August 2014	15:30	A	Cologne	FC Viktoria Köln	4–2	5,239	Ronny 33'; Beerens 41'; Haraguchi 52'; Schieber 76'	Wunderlich 57'; Candan 67'	
Round 2	28 October 2014	19:00	A	Bielefeld	Arminia Bielefeld	0–0 (2–4 (p))	23,098			

== Player informations ==
As of 24 May 2015

No.	Pos	Nat	Player	Total		Bundesliga		DFB-Pokal	
No.	Pos	Nat	Player	Apps	Goals	Apps	Goals	Apps	Goals
1	GK	(Germany) GER	Thomas Kraft	34	0	32	0	2	0
2	DF	(Slovakia) SVK	Peter Pekarík	31	0	29	0	2	0
3	MF	(Norway) NOR	Per Ciljan Skjelbred	26	0	26	0	0	0
5	DF	(Netherlands) NED	John Heitinga	14	1	13	1	1	0
7	MF	(Japan) JPN	Hajime Hosogai	22	0	20	0	2	0
8	MF	(Cameroon) CMR	Marcel Ndjeng	17	1	16	1	1	0
9	MF	(Germany) GER	Alexander Baumjohann	1	0	0	0	1	0
10	FW	(Tunisia) TUN	Änis Ben-Hatira	16	4	15	4	1	0
11	FW	(Ivory Coast) CIV	Salomon Kalou	27	6	26	6	1	0
12	DF	(Brazil) BRA	Ronny	21	4	19	3	2	1
13	MF	(Germany) GER	Jens Hegeler	25	1	23	1	2	0
14	MF	(Switzerland) SUI	Valentin Stocker	27	3	26	3	1	0
15	DF	(Germany) GER	Sebastian Langkamp	17	1	16	1	1	0
16	FW	(Germany) GER	Julian Schieber	18	8	16	7	2	1
17	MF	(Germany) GER	Tolga Ciğerci	2	0	2	0	0	0
18	MF	(Germany) GER	Peter Niemeyer	17	1	16	1	1	0
21	DF	(Germany) GER	Marvin Plattenhardt	15	0	15	0	0	0
22	GK	(Norway) NOR	Rune Jarstein	1	0	1	0	0	0
23	DF	(Germany) GER	Johannes van den Bergh	6	0	6	0	0	0
24	FW	(Japan) JPN	Genki Haraguchi	23	2	21	1	2	1
25	DF	(United States) USA	John Brooks	28	1	27	1	1	0
26	MF	(Germany) GER	Nico Schulz	29	1	28	1	1	0
27	FW	(Netherlands) NED	Roy Beerens	29	5	27	4	2	1
28	MF	(Switzerland) SUI	Fabian Lustenberger	28	0	27	0	1	0
30	GK	(Germany) GER	Sascha Burchert	2	0	2	0	0	0
33	FW	(Germany) GER	Sandro Wagner	15	0	14	0	1	0
35	GK	(Germany) GER	Marius Gersbeck	0	0	0	0	0	0
Players who left the club during the 2014–15 season
6	DF	(Germany) GER	Christoph Janker	0	0	0	0	0	0
11	FW	(Tunisia) TUN	Sami Allagui (on loan to 1. FSV Mainz 05)	1	0	1	0	0	0
34	MF	(Germany) GER	Hany Mukhtar	0	0	0	0	0	0

== Notes ==
- 1.Kickoff time in Central European Time/Central European Summer Time.
- 2.Hertha BSC's goals first.
