= Burchert =

Burchert is a German language surname. It stems from the male given name Burchard – and may refer to:

- Nico Burchert (born 1987), German footballer
- Sascha Burchert (born 1989), German footballer
