= 2013–14 Hertha BSC season =

Hertha BSC
2013–14 season
- Sporting Director: Michael Preetz
- Manager: Jos Luhukay
- Stadium: Olympic Stadium, Berlin, Germany
- Bundesliga: 11th
- DFB-Pokal: Second round
- Top goalscorer: League: Adrián Ramos (16 goals); All: Adrián Ramos (16 goals)
- Highest home attendance: 76,197 vs. Borussia Dortmund, 10 May 2014; 76,197 vs. Bayern Munich, 25 March 2014
- Lowest home attendance: 37,438 vs. 1. FC Nürnberg, 2 February 2014
- Average home league attendance: 51,895
Home colours	Away colours	Third colours

The 2013–14 Hertha BSC season was the 121st season in club history.

== Background ==
Hertha won the 2012–13 2. Bundesliga, therefore securing promotion for the 2013–14 Bundesliga. The club's pre-season began on 23 June, with 500 fans showing up to the first pre-season training session.

For the season, Hertha signed Hajime Hosogai, Alexander Baumjohann, Sebastian Langkamp, and Johannes van den Bergh. Hertha also brought in on loan Per Ciljan Skjelbred and Tolga Ciğerci. Alfredo Morales, Marvin Knoll, Shervin Radjabali-Fardi, Daniel Beichler, Marco Djuricin, Roman Hubník all departed Hertha, while Felix Bastians was loaned out.

=== Transfers ===
==== In ====
Pos.	Name	Age	Moving from	Type	Transfer Window	Contract ends	Transfer fee	Ref.
MF	(Japan) Hajime Hosogai	27	Bayer Leverkusen	Transfer	Summer	2017	Undisclosed	
MF	(Germany) Alexander Baumjohann	26	1. FC Kaiserslautern	End of contract	Summer	2016	Free	
MF	(Norway) Per Ciljan Skjelbred	26	Hamburger SV	Loan	Summer	2014	Undisclosed	
MF	(Germany) Tolga Ciğerci	21	VfL Wolfsburg	Loan	Summer	2014	€300,000	
DF	(Germany) Sebastian Langkamp	25	FC Augsburg	Transfer	Summer	2016	Free	
GK	(Norway) Rune Jarstein	29	Viking	Transfer	Winter	2016	Free	
DF	(Germany) Johannes van den Bergh	26	Fortuna Düsseldorf	Transfer	Summer	2016	Free	

==== Out ====
Pos.	Name	Age	Moving to	Type	Transfer Window	Transfer fee	Ref.
DF	(United States) Alfredo Morales	23	FC Ingolstadt	Transfer	Summer	Free	
MF	(Germany) Marvin Knoll	23	SV Sandhausen	Released	Summer	Free	
DF	(Germany) Shervin Radjabali-Fardi	22	Hansa Rostock	Released	Summer	Free	
FW	(Austria) Daniel Beichler	24	Sturm Graz	Transfer	Summer	Undisclosed	
FW	(Austria) Marco Djuricin	20	Sturm Graz	Transfer	Summer	Undisclosed	
DF	(Germany) Felix Bastians	25	VfL Bochum	Loan	Summer		
DF	(Czech Republic) Roman Hubník	29	Viktoria Plzeň	Transfer	Summer	Free	
MF	(Germany) Fanol Perdedaj	22	Energie Cottbus	Transfer	Winter	Undisclosed	
FW	(Germany) Pierre-Michel Lasogga	21	Hamburger SV	Loan	Winter		
FW	(Israel) Ben Sahar	24	Arminia Bielefeld	Loan	Winter		

== Bundesliga ==
=== Bundesliga review ===
Hertha began their Bundesliga campaign against Eintracht Frankfurt on 10 August. Hertha BSC won 6–1. Adrián Ramos, John Brooks, Sami Allagui and Ronny scored for Hertha; Ramos and Allagui scored two goals each. Alexander Meier scored for Eintracht. Hertha finished the matchday in first place. Hertha then faced 1. FC Nürnberg on 18 August on matchday two of the Bundesliga, with the match ending in a 2–2 draw. Allagui and Ronny scored for Hertha, while Josip Drmić and Hiroshi Kiyotake scored for Nürnberg. Hertha finished the matchday in sixth place. Hertha then faced Hamburger SV on matchday three, on 24 August, where Hertha won 1–0 through a Ramos goal. Hertha finished the matchday in fifth place. Hertha finished August with matchday four on 31 August against VfL Wolfsburg, falling 2–0 through Ivica Olić and Diego goals for Wolfsburg. Hertha ended August in sixth place.

Hertha BSC faced VfB Stuttgart on matchday five on 13 September. Stuttgart won 1–0 with a goal from Christian Gentner. Hertha finished the matchday in eighth place. Hertha played SC Freiburg on matchday six on 22 September; the match ended in a 1–1 draw. Per Ciljan Skjelbred scored for Hertha while Admir Mehmedi scored for Freiburg. Hertha finished the matchday in 10th place. Hertha finished September against Mainz 05 on matchday seven on 28 September; Hertha BSC won 3–1. Sami Allagui (2) and Änis Ben-Hatira scored for Hertha, while Nicolai Müller scored for Mainz. Hertha BSC finished September in fifth place.

Hertha started October with matchday eight against Hannover 96 on 4 October. The match ended in a 1–1 draw. Ronny scored for Hertha and Christian Schulz scored for Hannover. Hertha finished the matchday in sixth place. Hertha faced Borussia Mönchengladbach on matchday nine on 19 October. Hertha won 1–0 with a goal from Adrián Ramos. Hertha finished the matchday in fourth place. Hertha finished October against Bayern Munich on matchday 10 on 26 October. Bayern won 3–2. Ramos and Änis Ben-Hatira scored for Hertha. Mario Mandžukić (2) and Mario Götze scored for Bayern. Hertha finished October in fifth place.

Hertha started November against Schalke 04 on matchday 11 on 2 November, where Schalke won 2–0 through goals from Ádám Szalai and Julian Draxler. Hertha finished the matchday in seventh place. Hertha faced 1899 Hoffenheim on matchday 12 on 9 November. Hertha won 3–2. Ben-Hatira and Ramos (2) scored for Hertha Sejad Salihović scored two goals for Hoffenheim. Hertha finished the matchday in seventh place. Hertha faced Bayer Leverkusen on matchday 13 on 23 November. Bayer Leverkusen won 1–0 with a goal from Stefan Kießling. Hertha finished the matchday in seventh place. Hertha finished November against FC Augsburg on matchday 14 on 30 November. The match ended in a 0–0 draw. Hertha finished November in seventh place.

Hertha started December against Eintracht Braunschweig on matchday 15 on 8 December. Hertha won 2–0 with goals from Adrián Ramos and Tolga Ciğerci. Hertha finished the matchday in seventh place. Hertha faced Werder Bremen on matchday 16 on 13 December. Hertha won 3–2. Ramos (2) and Ronny scored for Hertha, while Nils Petersen and Aaron Hunt scored for Bremen. Hertha finished the matchday in seventh place. Hertha finished December with matchday 17 against Borussia Dortmund on 21 December, winning 2–1. Ramos and Sami Allagui scored for Hertha. Marco Reus scored for Borussia Dortmund. Hertha finished December in sixth place. Hertha returned to competitive action with matchday 18 against Eintracht Frankfurt. Eintracht Frankfurt won 1–0 with a goal from Alexander Meier. Hertha finished the matchday in seventh place.

=== Bundesliga fixtures and results ===
==== Legend ====
Win Draw Loss Postponed

==== League fixtures & results ====
MD	Date Kickoff^{1}	Venue	Opponent	Res.^{2}	Att.	Goalscorers and disciplined players		Ref.
MD	Date Kickoff^{1}	Venue	Opponent	Res.^{2}	Att.	Hertha BSC	Opponent	Ref.
1	10 August; 15:30	H	Eintracht Frankfurt	6–1	54,476	Ramos 18', 71'; Brooks 32'; Allagui 58', 60'; Ronny 89'	Flum (yellow card) 24'; Zambrano (yellow card) 33'; Meier 37'	
2	18 August; 15:30	A	1. FC Nürnberg	2–2	37,068	Pekarík (yellow card) 32'; Baumjohann (yellow card) 53'; Allagui 61'; Ronny 78'	Dabanlı (yellow card) 8'; Feulner (yellow card) 27'; Drmić 40'; Pinola (yellow card) 53'; Stark (yellow card) 69'; Chandler (yellow card) 71'; Kiyotake 89'	
3	24 August; 18:30	H	Hamburger SV	1–0	63,574	Schulz (yellow card) 38'; Ramos 74'	Westermann (yellow card) 17'; Lam (yellow card) 28'; Zoua (yellow card) 28'; Beister (yellow card) 62'	
4	31 August; 15:30	A	VfL Wolfsburg	0–2	25,000	Langkamp (yellow card) 59'; Wagner (yellow card) 64'	Naldo (yellow card) 23'; Olić 42'; Diego 45'	
5	13 September; 20:30	H	VfB Stuttgart	0–1	46,624	Ronny (yellow card) 87'	Ibišević (yellow card) 34'; Gentner 49'	
6	22 September; 15:30	A	SC Freiburg	1–1	23,200	Skjelbred 38' (yellow card) 65'; Ben-Hatira (yellow card) 72'; Langkamp (yellow card) 84'; Wagner (yellow card) 90+2'	Mehmedi 6'; Kerk (yellow card) 9'; Coquelin (yellow card) 89'	
7	28 September; 15:30	H	Mainz 05	3–1	40,969	Allagui 48', 73'; Ben-Hatira 74'; Pekarík (yellow card) 86'	Müller (yellow card) 1' (goal) 8'; Noveski (yellow card) 39'; Slišković (yellow card) 82'; Zimling (yellow card) 84'	
8	4 October; 20:30	A	Hannover 96	1–1	42,000	Allagui (yellow card) 36'; Schulz (yellow card) 51'; Langkamp (yellow card) 61'; Ronny 81'	Schlaudraff (yellow card) 6'; Schulz 23'; Stindl (yellow card) 53'; Marcelo (yellow card) 82'	
9	19 October; 18:30	H	Borussia Mönchengladbach	1–0	61,539	Ramos 36', (yellow card) 90+4'; Kobiashvili (yellow card) 52'	Raffael (yellow card) 33'; Stranzl (yellow card) 90' (yellow-red card) 90+2'	
10	26 October; 15:30	A	Bayern Munich	2–3	71,000	Ramos 4', (yellow card) 52'; Hosogai (yellow card) 50'; Ben-Hatira 58'; Pekarík (yellow card) 65'; Skjelbred (yellow card) 90'	Boateng (yellow card) 28'; Mandžukić 30', 51'; Schweinsteiger (yellow card) 35'; Rafinha (yellow card) 50'; Götze 54'	
11	2 October; 15:30	H	Schalke 04	0–2	69,277	Hosogai (yellow card) 55'; Ciğerci (yellow card) 72'; Langkamp (yellow card) 77'	Szalai 26'; Neustäadter (yellow card) 43'; Draxler 90+4'	
12	9 October; 15:30	A	1899 Hoffenheim	3–2	25,078	Ben-Hatira 13', (yellow card) 24'; Pekarík (yellow card) 18'; Ramos 53', 84'	Strobl (yellow card) 38'; Salihović 70', 81'; Modeste (yellow card) 76'	
13	23 October; 15:30	H	Bayer Leverkusen	0–1	47,419	Ronny (yellow card) 90+1'	Kießling 29'; Can (yellow card) 35'	
14	30 November; 15:30	H	FC Augsburg	0–0	38,667	Ciğerci (yellow card) 30'	Callsen-Bracker (yellow card) 74'	
15	8 November; 17:30	A	Eintracht Braunschweig	2–0	23,100	Ramos 20'; Hosogai (yellow card) 37'; Ndjeng (yellow card) 43'; Schulz (yellow card) 73'; Van den Bergh (yellow card) 78'; Ciğerci 80'	Oehrl (yellow card) 45+2'; Perthel (yellow card) 60' (yellow-red card) 81'; Bellarabi (yellow card) 83'	
16	13 November; 20:30	H	Werder Bremen	3–2	48,721	Ramos 17' (pen.), 26'; Ronny 48'; Ciğerci (yellow card) 66'	Petersen 15'; Gebre Selassie (yellow card) 17'; Hunt 32'; García (yellow card) 51'	
17	21 December; 15:30	A	Borussia Dortmund	2–1	80,645	Ramos 23'; Allagui 45'; Ciğerci (yellow card) 50'; Kobiashvili (yellow card) 67'; Hosogai (yellow card) 82'	Reus 7'; Sarr (yellow card) 45+2'; Şahin (yellow card) 90+1'	
18	25 January; 18:30	A	Eintracht Frankfurt	0–1	41,600	Ramos (yellow card) 26'; Ronny (yellow card) 72'; Skjelbred (yellow card) 75'	Zambrano (yellow card) 21'; Meier 36'; Schwegler (yellow card) 90'	
19	2 February; 15:30	H	1. FC Nürnberg	1–3	37,438	Van den Bergh (yellow card) 2'; Ramos 4'; Ronny (yellow card) 64'; Lustenberger (yellow card) 81'	Feulner 20'; Frantz (yellow card) 32'; Drmić 68', 90'	
20	8 February; 18:30	A	Hamburger SV	3–0	48,593	Allagui 15'; Ramos 23', 38'	Arslan (yellow card) 72'; Westermann (yellow card) 81'	
21	16 February; 17:30	H	VfL Wolfsburg	1–2	40,648	Skjelbred 21'	Luiz Gustavo (yellow card) 25'; Knoche 58'; Caligiuri 78'; Klose (yellow card) 82'	
22	22 February; 15:30	A	VfB Stuttgart	2–1	45,700	Kobiashvili 5'; Allagui (yellow card) 52'; Wagner 87', (yellow card) 90' (yellow-red card) 90+1'	Boka 45'	
23	28 February; 20:30	H	SC Freiburg	0–0	37,920	—	—	
24	9 March; 17:30	A	Mainz 05	1–1	29,760	Ramos 51'; Allagui (yellow card) 65'; Wagner (yellow card) 90+2'	Park (yellow card) 44'; Choupo-Moting 65'; Moritz (yellow card) 90'	
25	15 March; 15:30	H	Hannover 96	0–3	46,727	Niemeyer (yellow card) 85'	Andreasen (yellow card) 10'; Stindl 49'; Schlaudraff 57'; Hoffmann (yellow card) 85'; Huszti 90+1'	
26	22 March; 18:30	A	Borussia Mönchengladbach	0–3	53,030	Langkamp (yellow card) 30'	Kramer (yellow card) 12'; Arango 28'; Kruse 32'; Raffael 40'	
27	25 March; 20:00	H	Bayern Munich	1–3	76,197	Ramos 66'; Skjelbred (yellow card) 69'	Kroos 6'; Götze 14'; Ribéry 79'	
28	28 March; 20:30	A	Schalke 04	0–2	61,550	Ciğerci (yellow card) 33'	Obasi 16'; Huntelaar 46'; Neustädter (yellow card) 65'	
29	6 April; 17:30	H	1899 Hoffenheim	1–1	43,874	Allagui 11'; Brooks (yellow card) 36'	Polanski (yellow card) 21', (goal) 30'; Elyounoussi (yellow card) 24'	
30	13 April; 15:30	A	Bayer Leverkuusen	1–2	29,377	Ciğerci (yellow card) 9'; Wagner 38'	Kießling 1'; Brandt 24'; Donati (yellow card) 79'	
31	19 April; 15:30	A	FC Augsburg	0–0	30,059	Allagui (yellow card) 63'; Langkamp (yellow card) 67'; Niemeyer (yellow card) 89'	Ostrzolek (yellow card) 52'	
32	26 April; 15:30	H	Eintracht Braunschweig	2–0	51,953	Brooks 61'; Allagui 77'	—	
33	3 May; 15:30	A	Werder Bremen	0–2	42,100	Brooks (yellow card) 56'	Di Santo (yellow card) 4'; Hunt 48', 50'; García (yellow card) 61'; Elia (yellow card) 67'	
34	10 May; 15:30	H	Borussia Dortmund	0–4	76,197	Schulz (yellow card) 70'; Wagner (yellow card) 86'	Lewandowski 41', 80'; Jojić 44'; Mkhitaryan 82'	

=== League table ===
Pos	Team	Pld	W	D	L	GF	GA	GD	Pts
9	1899 Hoffenheim	34	11	11	12	72	70	+2	44
10	Hannover 96	34	12	6	16	46	59	−13	42
11	Hertha BSC	34	11	8	15	40	48	−8	41
12	Werder Bremen	34	10	9	15	42	66	−24	39
13	Eintracht Frankfurt	34	9	9	16	40	57	−17	36

Source: DFB
Rules for classification: 1) points; 2) goal difference; 3) number of goals scored.

=== Results summary ===
Overall								Home						Away					
Pld	W	D	L	GF	GA	GD	Pts	W	D	L	GF	GA	GD	W	D	L	GF	GA	GD
34	11	8	15	40	48	−8	41	6	4	7	19	22	−3	5	4	8	21	26	−5

Last updated: 12 May 2014.

== DFB–Pokal ==
=== DFB–Pokal review ===
The draw for the first round of the DFB-Pokal occurred on 15 June. Hertha was drawn against VfR Neumünster. The match took place on 4 August and Hertha BSC won 3–2 in extra time. Änis Ben-Hatira (2) and Sami Allagui scored for Hertha. Harrer and Kramer scored for Neumünster. The draw for the second round of the DFB-Pokal occurred on 10 August. Hertha were drawn against 1. FC Kaiserslautern. The match took place on 25 September, where Kaiserslautern won 3–1, eliminating Hertha from the competition. Peter Niemeyer scored for Hertha, while Mohammadou Idrissou, Karim Matmour and Olivier Occéan scored for Kaiserslautern.

=== DFB–Pokal results ===
==== Legend ====
Win Draw Loss Postponed

==== DFB–Pokal results ====
RD	Date^{1}	Venue	Opponent	Result^{2}	Attendance	Goalscorers		Ref.
RD	Date^{1}	Venue	Opponent	Result^{2}	Attendance	Hertha BSC	Opponent	Ref.
FR	4 August – 16:00	A	VfR Neumünster	3–2 (aet)	8,000	Ben-Hatira 16', 30'; Allagui 120'	Harrer 5'; Kramer 58'	
SR	25 September – 19:00	A	1. FC Kaiserslautern	1–3	24,291	Niemeyer 25'	Idrissou 52'; Matmour 63'; Occéan 83'	

== Player information ==
=== Squad statistics ===
==== Squad, appearances and goals ====
As of 12 May 2014

No.	Pos	Nat	Player	Total		Bundesliga		DFB-Pokal	
No.	Pos	Nat	Player	Apps	Goals	Apps	Goals	Apps	Goals
1	GK	(Germany) GER	Thomas Kraft	34	0	32	0	2	0
2	DF	(Slovakia) SVK	Peter Pekarík	31	0	31	0	0	0
3	DF	(Georgia (country)) GEO	Levan Kobiashvili	15	1	15	1	0	0
5	DF	(Germany) GER	Maik Franz	1	0	0	0	1	0
6	DF	(Germany) GER	Christoph Janker	6	0	5	0	1	0
7	MF	(Japan) JPN	Hajime Hosogai	34	0	33	0	1	0
8	MF	(Cameroon) CMR	Marcel Ndjeng	18	0	17	0	1	0
9	MF	(Germany) GER	Alexander Baumjohann	10	0	9	0	1	0
10	FW	(Tunisia) TUN	Änis Ben-Hatira	22	5	21	3	1	2
11	FW	(Tunisia) TUN	Sami Allagui	31	10	29	9	2	1
12	DF	(Brazil) BRA	Ronny	28	4	27	4	1	0
13	MF	(Norway) NOR	Per Ciljan Skjelbred	28	2	28	2	0	0
15	DF	(Germany) GER	Sebastian Langkamp	30	0	29	0	1	0
17	MF	(Germany) GER	Tolga Ciğerci	20	1	19	1	1	0
18	MF	(Germany) GER	Peter Niemeyer	21	1	20	0	1	1
20	FW	(Colombia) COL	Adrián Ramos	34	16	32	16	2	0
21	GK	(Germany) GER	Sascha Burchert	0	0	0	0	0	0
22	GK	(Norway) NOR	Rune Jarstein	1	0	1	0	0	0
23	DF	(Germany) GER	Johannes van den Bergh	27	0	26	0	1	0
24	MF	(Germany) GER	Peer Kluge	3	0	2	0	1	0
25	DF	(United States) USA	John Brooks	17	2	16	2	1	0
26	MF	(Germany) GER	Nico Schulz	24	0	23	0	1	0
28	MF	(Switzerland) SUI	Fabian Lustenberger	21	0	19	0	2	0
32	MF	(Germany) GER	Fabian Holland	4	0	3	0	1	0
33	FW	(Germany) GER	Sandro Wagner	27	2	25	2	2	0
34	MF	(Germany) GER	Hany Mukhtar	11	0	10	0	1	0
35	GK	(Germany) GER	Marius Gersbeck	1	0	1	0	0	0
37	GK	(Germany) GER	Philip Sprint	0	0	0	0	0	0
Players who left the club during the 2013-14 season
4	DF	(Czech Republic) CZE	Roman Hubník	0	0	0	0	0	0
16	FW	(Israel) ISR	Ben Sahar (on loan to Arminia Bielefeld)	1	0	0	0	1	0
19	FW	(Germany) GER	Pierre-Michel Lasogga (on loan to Hamburger SV)	0	0	0	0	0	0

=== Discipline ===
No.	Player	Total			Bundesliga			DFB-Pokal		
No.	Player	Yellow card	(yellow card) (red card)	Red card	Yellow card	(yellow card) (red card)	Red card	Yellow card	(yellow card) (red card)	Red card
33	Sandro Wagner	6	1	0	5	1	0	1	0	0
15	Sebastian Langkamp	6	0	0	6	0	0	0	0	0
17	Tolga Ciğerci	6	0	0	6	0	0	0	0	0
2	Peter Pekarík	4	0	0	4	0	0	0	0	0
7	Hajime Hosogai	4	0	0	4	0	0	0	0	0
12	Ronny	4	0	0	4	0	0	0	0	0
13	Per Ciljan Skjelbred	4	0	0	4	0	0	0	0	0
11	Sami Allagui	4	0	0	4	0	0	0	0	0
26	Nico Schulz	4	0	0	4	0	0	0	0	0
20	Adrián Ramos	3	0	0	3	0	0	0	0	0
10	Änis Ben-Hatira	2	0	0	2	0	0	0	0	0
3	Levan Kobiashvili	2	0	0	2	0	0	0	0	0
28	Fabian Lustenberger	2	0	0	1	0	0	1	0	0
23	Johannes van den Bergh	2	0	0	2	0	0	0	0	0
18	Peter Niemeyer	2	0	0	2	0	0	0	0	0
25	John Brooks	2	0	0	2	0	0	0	0	0
9	Alexander Baumjohann	1	0	0	1	0	0	0	0	0
8	Marcel Ndjeng	1	0	0	1	0	0	0	0	0
Totals		57	1	0	55	1	0	2	0	0
Last updated: 12 May 2014

== Notes ==
- 1.Kickoff time in Central European Time/Central European Summer Time.
- 2.Hertha BSC's goals first.
