= 2012–13 Hertha BSC season =

Hertha BSC
2012–13 season
- Sporting Director: Michael Preetz
- Manager: Jos Luhukay
- Stadium: Olympic Stadium, Berlin, Germany
- 2. Bundesliga: 1st
- DFB-Pokal: First round
- Top goalscorer: League: Ronny (18 goals); All: Ronny (18 goals)
- Highest home attendance: 74,244 (v. 1. FC Union Berlin, 11 February 2013)
- Lowest home attendance: 23,404 (v. Paderborn 07, 3 August 2012)
- Average home league attendance: 40,030
Home colours	Away colours	Third colours

The 2012–13 Hertha BSC season was the 120th season in club history. Hertha BSC lost to Fortuna Düsseldorf in the promotion/relegation playoff. The sports court and the Federal Court of the German Football Association (DFB) confirmed the club's relegation after the club appealed the result of the second leg, losing both appeals.

Defender Levan Kobiashvili was suspended for the remainder of the 2012 calendar year, whilst goalkeeper Thomas Kraft was suspended for five matches for their role in an altercation with the referee during the promotion/relegation playoff against Fortuna Düsseldorf. Christian Lell and Andre Mijatović were also suspended for their participation in the altercation. But both were eventually released from the club.

== Review and events ==
Hertha BSC were relegated during the 2011–12 Bundesliga season after losing to 2. Bundesliga club Fortuna Düsseldorf in the promotion/relegation playoff. The sports court and the Federal Court of the DFB confirmed the relegation after the club appealed the result of the second leg and lost both appeals. The DFB also issued suspensions to several Hertha players—Levan Kobiashvili was banned for a year, Christian Lell was banned for six matches, Thomas Kraft was banned for five matches and Andre Mijatović was banned for four matches. Kobiashvili's suspension was reduced to seven and a half months and Lell's ban was reduced to 5 matches. The suspensions were for an altercation with the referee during the playoff with Fortuna Düsseldorf. Lell and Mijatović were eventually released by the club. The club itself was also disciplined for its role in the events of the second leg of the playoff, originally being issued a €50,000 fine and limited to 20,000 tickets sold for their league match against Paderborn 07. The fine, however, was later reduced to €40,000 and the ticket sale limit increased to 27,500. No tickets are allowed to be sold on the matchday. The club was also ordered to spend an additional €40,000 on a non-profit program as part of the discipline. Christian Lell, Andre Mijatović, Andreas Ottl and Patrick Ebert were all released from the club following the conclusion of the 2011–12 season.

Hertha BSC participated in the 2012–13 edition of the DFB-Pokal, where it was knocked out in the first round by Regionalliga Südwest side Wormatia Worms.

After its 1–0 win over SV Sandhausen on 21 April 2013, Hertha ensured direct promotion to the top-flight Bundesliga for the 2013–14 season. They later secured the 2012–13 2. Bundesliga title after defeating 1. FC Köln 2–1 on 12 May, their third 2. Bundesliga championship.

== Match results ==
=== Legend ===
Win Draw Loss Postponed

=== Friendly matches ===
29 June 2012	Berliner SC	0–3	Hertha BSC	Berlin
		report	33' Kachunga; 46' Knoll; 60' Djuricin	Stadium: Stadion Finsterwalder Strasse

4 July 2012	Hertha BSC	2–1	Midtjylland	Berlin
18:00	Kachunga 17', 77'	report	15' Igboun	Stadium: Amateurstadion; Attendance: 2,047

10 July 2012	Viktoria 89 Berlin	0–2	Hertha BSC	Berlin
18:00		report	10' Raffael; 58' Ndjeng	Stadium: Friedrich-Ebert-Stadion; Attendance: 3,680

13 July 2012	Hertha BSC	0–1	Teplice	Berlin
18:00		report	73' Mahmutović	Stadium: Amateurstadion; Attendance: 1,680

18 July 2012	Hannover 96	0–4	Hertha BSC	Hildesheim
18:30		report	37', 68' Beichler; 47' (o.g.) Andreasen; 89' Ronny	Stadium: Friedrich-Ebert-Stadion; Attendance: 3,680; Referee: Florian Meyer

21 July 2012	Norwich City	2–3	Hertha BSC	Gleisdorf
18:00	Vaughan 48', 58'	report	12', 13', 51' Kachunga	Stadium: Solar-Stadion

24 July 2012	TSV Hartberg	1–1	Hertha BSC	Hartberg
18:30	Hopfer 32'	report	5' Wagner	Stadium: Stadion Hartberg

28 July 2012	Hertha BSC	0–2	Juventus	Berlin
15:15		report	21' Matri; 90' Krasić	Stadium: Olympic Stadium; Attendance: 32,588; Referee: Bastian Dankert

9 January 2013	Hertha BSC	2–1	VfL Wolfsburg II	Berlin
	Allagui 39'; Wagner 90'	report	66' Bošković	Stadium: Amateurstadion; Attendance: 943

12 January 2013	VfL Wolfsburg	5–1	Hertha BSC	Wolfsburg
	Perišić 4'; Vieirinha 29'; Orozco 35'; Kahlenberg 54'; Knoche 81'	report	88' Lasogga	Stadium: Volkswagen Arena; Attendance: 4,473; Referee: Arne Aarnink

16 January 2013	Hamburger SV	2–1	Hertha BSC	Hamburg
	Berg 19', 25'	report	53' Mukhtar	Attendance: 30

22 January 2013	Hertha BSC	2–2	Bayern Munich II	Belek, Turkey
	Ronny 19'; Kluge 27'	report	75', 79' Duhnke	Stadium: Cornelia Diamond Resort; Attendance: 200

24 January 2013	Hertha BSC	2–0	FC Lugano	Belek, Turkey
	Lasogga 75'; Wagner 80'	report

25 January 2013	Hertha BSC	3–2	Sturm Graz	Belek, Turkey
	Ronny 36'; Allagui 37'; Ben-Hatira 70'	report	12' Szabics; 71' Kainz

=== 2. Bundesliga ===
==== League results and fixtures ====
3 August 2012 1	Hertha BSC	2–2	Paderborn 07	Berlin
20:30	Ronny 65'; Allagui 88'	Report	43' Yılmaz; 86' Meha	Stadium: Olympic Stadium; Attendance: 23,404; Referee: Deniz Aytekin

12 August 2012 2	FSV Frankfurt	3–1	Hertha BSC	Frankfurt
15:30	Schlicke 51'; Leckie 63'; Verhoek 90+1'	Report	40' Ben-Hatira	Stadium: Frankfurter Volksbank Stadion; Attendance: 6,329; Referee: Guido Winkmann

24 August 2012 3	Hertha BSC	2–1	Jahn Regensburg	Berlin
18:00	Allagui 41'; Wagner 43'	Report	57' Sembolo	Stadium: Olympic Stadium; Attendance: 29,886; Referee: Harm Osmers

3 September 2012 4	Union Berlin	1–2	Hertha BSC	Berlin
20:15	Quiring 69'	Report	30' Wagner; 73' Ronny	Stadium: Stadion An der Alten Försterei; Attendance: 16,750; Referee: Peter Gagelmann

16 September 2012 5	Hertha BSC	2–0	VfR Aalen	Berlin
13:30	Ramos 60'; Ronny 90+1'	Report		Stadium: Olympic Stadium; Attendance: 34,712; Referee: Peter Sippel

22 September 2012 6	1. FC Kaiserslautern	1–1	Hertha BSC	Kaiserslautern
13:00	Idrissou 66'	Report	69' Ronny	Stadium: Fritz-Walter-Stadion; Attendance: 31.000; Referee: Thorsten Kinhöfer

26 September 2012 7	Hertha BSC	1–0	Dynamo Dresden	Berlin
17:30	Brégerie 5' (o.g.)	Report		Stadium: Olympic Stadium; Attendance: 45.747; Referee: Günter Perl

1 October 2012 8	MSV Duisburg	2–2	Hertha BSC	Duisburg
20:15	Baljak 55', 72'	Report	3' Hubník; 78' Wagner	Stadium: Schauinsland-Reisen-Arena; Attendance: 12.177; Referee: Martin Petersen

5 October 2012 9	Hertha BSC	3–0	1860 München	Berlin
13:30	Ramos 55'; Ben-Hatira 57', 77'	Report		Stadium: Olympic Stadium; Attendance: 32,547; Referee: Markus Schmidt

19 October 2012 10	VfL Bochum	0–2	Hertha BSC	Bochum
13:30		Report	46' Kluge; 79' Ndjeng	Stadium: rewirpowerSTADION; Attendance: 13,985; Referee: Florian Meyer

27 October 2012 11	Eintracht Braunschweig	1–1	Hertha BSC	Braunschweig
13:30	Kruppke 25'	Report	78' Ramos	Stadium: Eintracht-Stadion; Attendance: 21,645; Referee: Jochen Drees

2 November 2012 12	Hertha BSC	0–0	FC Ingolstadt	Berlin
18:00		Report		Stadium: Olympic Stadium; Attendance: 33.156; Referee: Sascha Stegemann

9 November 2012 13	SV Sandhausen	1–6	Hertha BSC	Sandhausen
18:00	Wooten 75'	Report	28' Ramos; 34' Niemeyer; 68' (pen.) Ronny; 81' Allagui; 89' Ndjeng; 90' Sahar	Stadium: Hardtwaldstadion; Attendance: 8,300; Referee: Christian Dietz

19 November 2012 14	Hertha BSC	1–0	FC St. Pauli	Berlin
20:15	Sahar 85'	Report		Stadium: Olympic Stadium; Attendance: 39,127; Referee: Thorsten Kinhöfer

25 November 2012 15	Erzgebirge Aue	0–4	Hertha BSC	Aue
13:30		Report	1' Ramos; 8' Niemeyer; 56' (pen.) Ronny; 74' Allagui	Stadium: Sparkassen-Erzgebirgsstadion; Attendance: 11,150; Referee: Michael Weiner

29 November 2012 16	Hertha BSC	1–1	1. FC Köln	Berlin
20:15	Ronny 44'	Report	35' McKenna	Stadium: Olympic Stadium; Attendance: 34.307; Referee: Tobias Welz

3 December 2012 17	Energie Cottbus	1–2	Hertha BSC	Cottbus
20:15	Sørensen 54'	Report	16' Kluge; 84' Ronny	Stadium: Stadion der Freundschaft; Referee: Florian Meyer

8 December 2013 18	Paderborn 07	0–1	Hertha BSC	Paderborn
13:00		Report	65' Ramos	Stadium: Energieteam Arena; Attendance: 9.416; Referee: Tobias Stielar

15 December 2012 19	Hertha BSC	2–1	FSV Frankfurt	Berlin
13:00	Ndjeng 82'; Ronny 84'	Report	55' Görlitz	Stadium: Olympic Stadium; Attendance: 29.951; Referee: Tobias Christ

3 February 2013 20	Jahn Regensburg	1–5	Hertha BSC	Regensburg
13:30	Weidlich 78'	Report	52' Ramos; 56' (pen.), 85' Ronny; 68' Wagner; 90' Knoll	Stadium: Jahnstadion; Attendance: 10.212; Referee: Guido Winkmann

12 February 2013 21	Hertha BSC	2–2	Union Berlin	Berlin
20:45	Ramos 73'; Ronny 86'	Report	9' Terodde; 49' Nemec	Stadium: Olympic Stadium; Attendance: 74.244; Referee: Florian Meyer

16 February 2013 22	VfR Aalen	0–1	Hertha BSC	Aalen
13:00		Report	76' Ndjeng	Stadium: Scholz-Arena; Attendance: 8.119; Referee: Christian Dingert

25 February 2013 23	Hertha BSC	1–0	1. FC Kaiserslautern	Berlin
20:15	Kluge 68'	Report		Stadium: Olympic Stadium; Attendance: 37.347; Referee: Tobias Welz

1 March 2013 24	Dynamo Dresden	1–0	Hertha BSC	Dresden
13:00	Lasogga 38' (o.g.)	Report		Stadium: Glücksgas Stadium; Attendance: 29.174; Referee: Michael Weiner

10 March 2013 25	Hertha BSC	4–2	MSV Duisburg	Berlin
13:30	Ramos 12'; Ronny 24'; Allagui 57', 64'	Report	49' Brandy; 72' Bomheuer	Stadium: Olympic Stadium; Attendance: 31.635; Referee: Peter Sippel

16 March 2013 26	1860 München	0–0	Hertha BSC	Munich
13:00		Report		Stadium: Allianz Arena; Attendance: 25.400; Referee: Bastian Dankert

30 March 2013 27	Hertha BSC	2–0	VfL Bochum	Berlin
13:00	Ronny 4'; Schulz 46'	Report		Stadium: Olympic Stadium; Attendance: 34.802; Referee: Tobias Stieler

8 April 2013 28	Hertha BSC	3–0	Eintracht Braunschweig	Berlin
20:15	Ronny 34', 76'; Ramos 55'	Report		Stadium: Olympic Stadium; Attendance: 51.029; Referee: Peter Gagelmann

12 April 2013 29	FC Ingolstadt	1–1	Hertha BSC	Ingolstadt
18:00	Caiuby 14'	Report	64' Ben-Hatira	Stadium: Audi Sportpark; Attendance: 9,167; Referee: Frank Willenborg

21 April 2013 30	Hertha BSC	1–0	SV Sandhausen	Berlin
13:30	Lasogga 85'	Report		Stadium: Olympic Stadium; Attendance: 52,135; Referee: Christian Leicher

28 April 2013 31	FC St. Pauli	2–3	Hertha BSC	Hamburg
13:30	Thy 66'; Ginczek 85'	Report	23' Allagui; 88' Ronny; 90' Wagner	Stadium: Millerntor-Stadion; Attendance: 29.063; Referee: Felix Brych

3 May 2013 32	Hertha BSC	3–2	Erzgebirge Aue	Berlin
18:00	Ramos 10'; Ronny 34'; Hubník 44'	Report	46', 66' Sylestr	Stadium: Olympic Stadium; Attendance: 33,200; Referee: Bastian Dankert

12 May 2013 33	1. FC Köln	1–2	Hertha BSC	Cologne
13:30	Clemens 68'	Report	36' Kobiashvili; 55' Morales	Stadium: RheinEnergieStadion; Attendance: 49.500; Referee: Guido Winkmann

19 May 2013 34	Hertha BSC	1–1	Energie Cottbus	Berlin
13:30	Brooks 87'	Report	28' Farina	Stadium: Olympic Stadium; Attendance: 63.267; Referee: Deniz Aytekin

==== Table ====
===== Overall league table =====
Pos	Team	Pld	W	D	L	GF	GA	GD	Pts	Promotion, qualification or relegation
1	Hertha BSC (C, P)	34	22	10	2	65	28	+37	76	Promotion to Bundesliga
2	Eintracht Braunschweig (P)	34	19	10	5	52	34	+18	67	Promotion to Bundesliga
3	1. FC Kaiserslautern	34	15	13	6	55	33	+22	58	Qualification for promotion play-offs
4	FSV Frankfurt	34	16	6	12	55	45	+10	54	
5	1. FC Köln	34	14	12	8	43	33	+10	54	

Source: kicker.de
Rules for classification: 1) points; 2) goal difference; 3) number of goals scored.
(C) Champions; (P) Promoted

===== Table summary =====
Overall								Home						Away					
Pld	W	D	L	GF	GA	GD	Pts	W	D	L	GF	GA	GD	W	D	L	GF	GA	GD
34	22	10	2	65	28	+37	76	12	5	0	31	12	+19	10	5	2	34	16	+18

Last updated: 19 May 2013.
Source: kicker.de

=== DFB-Pokal ===
19 August 2012 1st Round	Wormatia Worms	2 – 1	Hertha BSC	Worms
14:30	Bauer 3' (pen.); Dressler 82'	Report	64' Wagner	Stadium: EWR-Arena; Attendance: 6.263; Referee: Norbert Grudzinski

== Squad ==
=== Squad and statistics ===
==== Squad, appearances and goals scored ====
As of 18 May 2013

No.	Pos	Nat	Player	Total		2. Bundesliga		DFB-Pokal	
No.	Pos	Nat	Player	Apps	Goals	Apps	Goals	Apps	Goals
1	GK	(Germany) GER	Thomas Kraft	28	0	28	0	0	0
2	DF	(Slovakia) SVK	Peter Pekarík	19	0	19	0	0	0
3	DF	(Georgia (country)) GEO	Levan Kobiashvili	11	1	11	1	0	0
4	DF	(Czech Republic) CZE	Roman Hubník	16	2	16	2	0	0
5	DF	(Germany) GER	Maik Franz	10	0	9	0	1	0
6	DF	(Germany) GER	Christoph Janker	5	0	5	0	0	0
7	MF	(Austria) AUT	Daniel Beichler	1	0	1	0	0	0
8	MF	(Cameroon) CMR	Marcel Ndjeng	28	4	27	4	1	0
9	FW	(Colombia) COL	Adrián Ramos	33	11	32	11	1	0
10	FW	(Tunisia) TUN	Änis Ben-Hatira	19	4	18	4	1	0
11	FW	(Tunisia) TUN	Sami Allagui	26	7	25	7	1	0
12	DF	(Brazil) BRA	Ronny	34	18	33	18	1	0
15	FW	(Germany) GER	Elias Kachunga	3	0	2	0	1	0
16	FW	(Israel) ISR	Ben Sahar	18	2	18	2	0	0
18	MF	(Germany) GER	Peter Niemeyer	26	1	25	1	1	0
19	FW	(Germany) GER	Pierre-Michel Lasogga	7	1	7	1	0	0
21	GK	(Germany) GER	Sascha Burchert	5	0	5	0	0	0
22	DF	(Germany) GER	Felix Bastians	12	0	11	0	1	0
24	MF	(Germany) GER	Peer Kluge	27	3	27	3	0	0
25	DF	(United States) USA	John Brooks	29	1	29	1	0	0
26	MF	(Germany) GER	Nico Schulz	20	1	20	1	0	0
27	DF	(United States) USA	Alfredo Morales	10	1	9	1	1	0
28	MF	(Switzerland) SUI	Fabian Lustenberger	34	0	33	0	1	0
29	MF	(Germany) GER	Marvin Knoll	6	1	6	1	0	0
31	DF	(Germany) GER	Shervin Radjabali-Fardi	0	0	0	0	0	0
32	MF	(Germany) GER	Fabian Holland	17	0	17	0	0	0
33	FW	(Germany) GER	Sandro Wagner	32	6	31	5	1	1
34	MF	(Germany) GER	Hany Mukhtar	7	0	7	0	0	0
37	GK	(Germany) GER	Philip Sprint	3	0	2	0	1	0

==== Bookings ====
Number	Nationality	Position	Name	2. Bundesliga		DFB-Pokal		Total	
Number	Nationality	Position	Name	Yellow card	Red card	Yellow card	Red card	Yellow card	Red card
1	(Germany)	GK	Thomas Kraft	1	0	0	0	1	0
2	(Slovakia)	DF	Peter Pekarík	4	0	0	0	4	0
4	(Czech Republic)	DF	Roman Hubník	1	0	0	0	1	0
5	(Germany)	DF	Maik Franz	5	1	0	0	5	1
8	(Cameroon)	MF	Marcel Ndjeng	5	0	0	0	5	0
9	(Colombia)	FW	Adrián Ramos	1	0	0	0	1	0
10	(Tunisia)	FW	Änis Ben-Hatira	3	0	1	0	4	0
11	(Tunisia)	FW	Sami Allagui	1	0	0	0	1	0
12	(Brazil)	MF	Ronny	4	0	0	0	4	0
18	(Germany)	MF	Peter Niemeyer	9	0	0	0	9	0
21	(Germany)	GK	Sascha Burchert	0	1	0	0	0	1
22	(Germany)	DF	Felix Bastians	1	0	1	0	2	0
24	(Germany)	MF	Peer Kluge	6	0	0	0	6	0
26	(Germany)	MF	Nico Schulz	2	0	0	0	2	0
27	(United States)	DF	Alfredo Morales	1	0	0	0	1	0
28	(Switzerland)	MF	Fabian Lustenberger	4	0	0	0	4	0
32	(Germany)	MF	Fabian Holland	6	0	0	0	6	0
33	(Germany)	FW	Sandro Wagner	4	0	0	0	4	0
37	(Germany)	GK	Philip Sprint	0	0	1	0	1	0
			TOTALS	58	2	3	0	61	2

=== Transfers ===
==== In ====
No.	Pos.	Nat.	Name	Age	EU	Moving from	Type	Transfer window	Ends	Transfer fee	Source
2	DF	(Slovakia)	Peter Pekarík	25	EU	VfL Wolfsburg	Transfer	Summer			
8	MF	(Cameroon)	Marcel Ndjeng	30	EU	FC Augsburg	Transfer	Summer	2014		
11	FW	(Tunisia)	Sami Allagui	26	EU	Mainz 05	Transfer	Summer	2016		
15	FW	(Germany)	Elias Kachunga	20	EU	Borussia Mönchengladbach	Loan	Summer	2013		
16	FW	(Israel)	Ben Sahar	22	EU	Espanyol	Transfer	Summer	2014		
25	MF	(Germany)	Peer Kluge	31	EU	Schalke 04	Transfer	Summer	2014		
33	FW	(Germany)	Sandro Wagner	24	EU	Werder Bremen	Transfer	Summer	2014		

==== Out ====
No.	Pos.	Name	Age	EU	Moving to	Type	Transfer Window	Transfer fee	Sources
2	DF	Christian Lell	27	EU	Levante	Released	Summer	Free	
5	DF	Andre Mijatović	32	EU	FC Ingolstadt	Released	Summer	Free	
8	MF	Andreas Ottl	27	EU	FC Augsburg	Released	Summer	Free	
13	MF	Nikita Rukavytsya	25	Non EU	Mainz 05	Transfer	Summer		
20	MF	Patrick Ebert	25	EU	Real Valladolid	Released	Summer	Free	
29	DF	Sebastian Neumann	21	EU	VfL Osnabrück	Transfer	Summer		
39	FW	Marco Djuricin	19	EU	Jahn Regensburg	Loan	Summer		

== Kits ==
Home	Away	Away Alternate	Third
