= John Brooks (soccer, born 1993) =

American soccer player (born 1993)

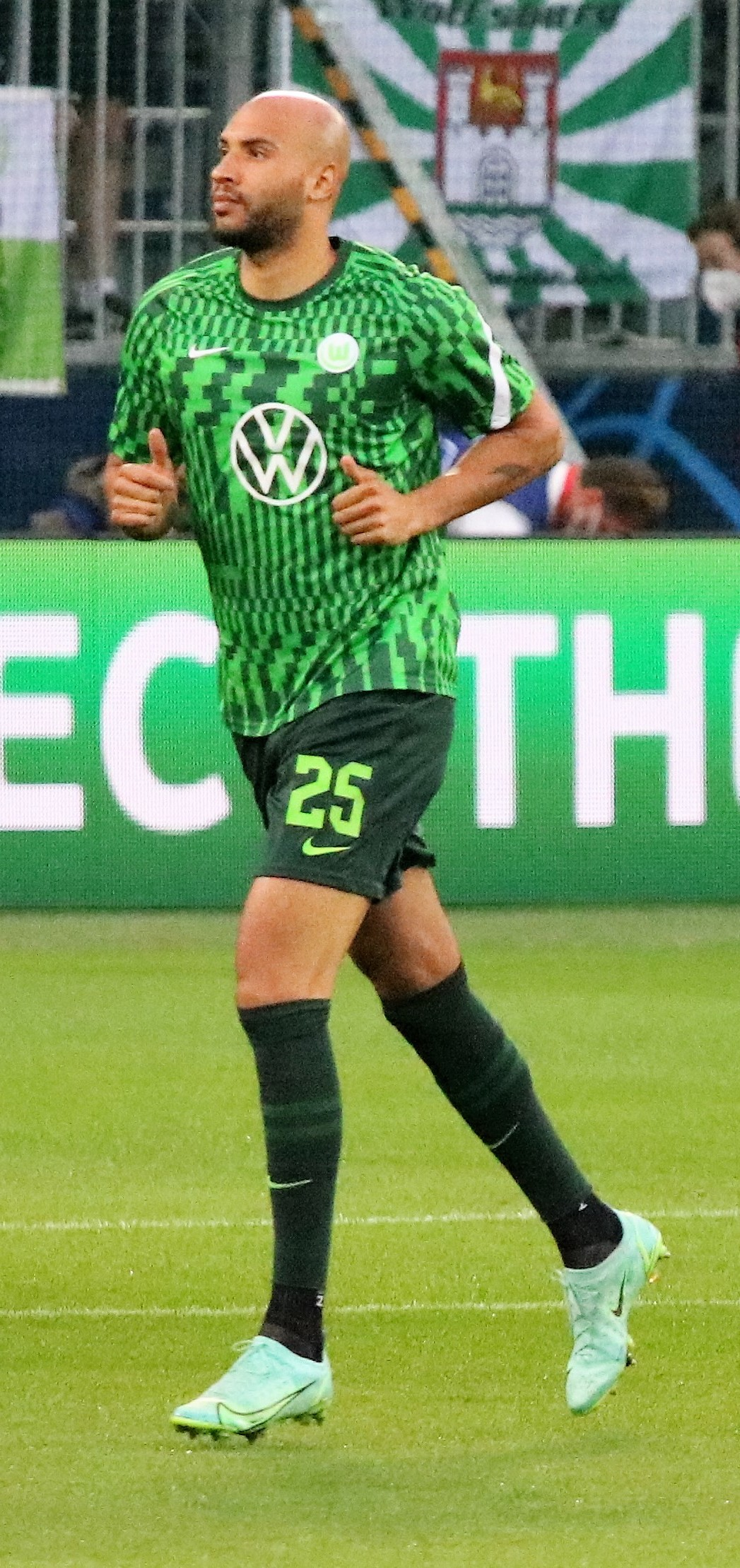
- Brooks with VfL Wolfsburg in 2021

Personal information
- Full name: John Anthony Brooks Jr.
- Date of birth: January 28, 1993 (age 33)
- Place of birth: Berlin, Germany
- Height: 1.94 m (6 ft 4 in)
- Position: Center-back

Team information
- Current team: VSG Altglienicke
- Number: 25

Youth career
- Hertha BSC

Senior career*
Years	Team	Apps	(Gls)
2011–2015	Hertha BSC II	37	(2)
2012–2017	Hertha BSC	119	(7)
2017–2022	VfL Wolfsburg	126	(6)
2022–2023	Benfica	2	(0)
2023–2024	TSG Hoffenheim	36	(2)
2024–2026	Hertha BSC	1	(0)
2026–	VSG Altglienicke	6	(3)

International career
2010–2011	United States U20	4	(0)
2011–2015	United States U23	2	(0)
2012	Germany U20	1	(0)
2013–2021	United States	45	(3)
Medal record
Representing United States
Men's soccer
CONCACAF Nations League
Winner	2021 United States
- * Club domestic league appearances and goals as of September 23, 2026

John Anthony Brooks Jr. (born January 28, 1993) is a professional soccer player who plays as a center-back for Regionalliga Nordost club VSG Altglienicke. Born in Germany, he represented the United States national team.

He began his career at hometown club Hertha BSC, making his professional debut in 2012 and totaling 130 games and nine goals for the club. The team won the 2. Bundesliga in 2012–13. In 2017, he transferred to VfL Wolfsburg for €20 million, a record at the time for an American player.

Brooks represented both Germany and the United States at youth international level, qualifying for the latter through his father. He made his senior international debut for the United States in 2013 and represented the nation at three tournaments, including the 2014 FIFA World Cup, where he scored against Ghana in the opening group match.

== Early life ==
Brooks is the son of an American serviceman from Chicago, Illinois, and was born and raised in Berlin, Germany. He has a map of Illinois tattooed on his left elbow and one of Berlin on his right. He has never lived in the United States.

== Club career ==
=== Hertha BSC ===
Brooks came through the ranks of his hometown club, Hertha BSC. He reached Hertha's reserve team halfway through the 2010–11 season, although he still had a year and a half of remaining eligibility for the U-19 team. Brooks signed a four-year professional contract with Hertha after the season, turning down interest from Bayern Munich. Brooks spent nearly all of the 2011–12 season with Hertha II, taking a brief foray back to the U-19 team. Brooks continued to grow during this time, reaching 6'4".

Hertha suffered relegation from the Bundesliga in 2012. After the departure of some players and his form in preseason, Brooks made his professional debut as a starter in Hertha's 2. Bundesliga opener on August 3, 2012, a 2–2 draw with SC Paderborn 07 at the Olympiastadion. He played 29 matches over the season as the team won the league title and promotion, and scored once in the last game of the season on May 19, 2013, a late equalizer in a 1–1 home draw with Energie Cottbus.

Brooks scored in his Bundesliga debut on August 10, 2013, in Hertha BSC's 6–1 victory against Eintracht Frankfurt. His appearances over the season were limited by injury and poor form, and he also missed time in April 2014 while recovering from the application of a large back tattoo, a decision that did not please manager Jos Luhukay.

On December 17, 2014, Brooks opened the scoring for Hertha in a 4–4 draw with Eintracht Frankfurt that saw Berlin throw away a two-goal lead in the final minute. During the 2014–15 Bundesliga season, Brooks won 68% of his direct duels in a total of 27 league appearances for the club, ranking third best among Bundesliga players making at least 17 appearances. Brooks also had a pass accuracy of 75% while finishing top 12 in the Bundesliga in clearances per match.

In the 2015–16 season, Brooks played four matches in Hertha's run to the semi-finals of the DFB-Pokal. On December 15, he headed the second goal of a 2–0 win at 1. FC Nürnberg in the last 16 of the tournament.

=== VfL Wolfsburg ===
On May 31, 2017, Brooks signed with fellow Bundesliga club VfL Wolfsburg. The reported €20 million transfer fee was a record for an American soccer player at the time, later broken by Christian Pulisic's €64 million transfer to Chelsea in 2019. He made his debut on August 13 in the first round of the DFB-Pokal away to fourth-tier Eintracht Norderstedt, but suffered a torn thigh tendon and was substituted in the first half of the 1–0 win, being ruled out for the next three months. On October 28, he returned to the team to start on his league debut for the club, a 1–1 draw at Schalke 04. Affected by injury all through his first season at the Volkswagen Arena, Brooks totaled just ten appearances before playing the full 180 minutes of the 4–1 playoff win over Holstein Kiel that kept his team in the Bundesliga for the following season.

On March 2, 2022, it was confirmed that Brooks would leave Wolfsburg at the end of the season.

=== Benfica ===
On September 1, 2022, Brooks signed a one-year contract with Primeira Liga side Benfica on a free transfer. He made his Primeira Liga debut on September 18, replacing António Silva in the 89th minute in the 5–0 home win over Marítimo.

=== TSG Hoffenheim ===
On January 26, 2023, Brooks returned to the Bundesliga, signing a two-year contract with TSG Hoffenheim, for a reported fee of €500,000.

Brooks left Hoffenheim at the end of the 2023–24 season.

=== Return to Hertha BSC ===
On August 29, 2024, Brooks returned to Hertha BSC on a two-season contract. He only made one appearance for Hertha during this spell, mostly dealing with recurring injuries.

=== VSG Altglienicke ===
On July 4, 2026, Brooks signed a two-year contract with a fourth-tier Regionalliga Nordost club VSG Altglienicke.

== International career ==
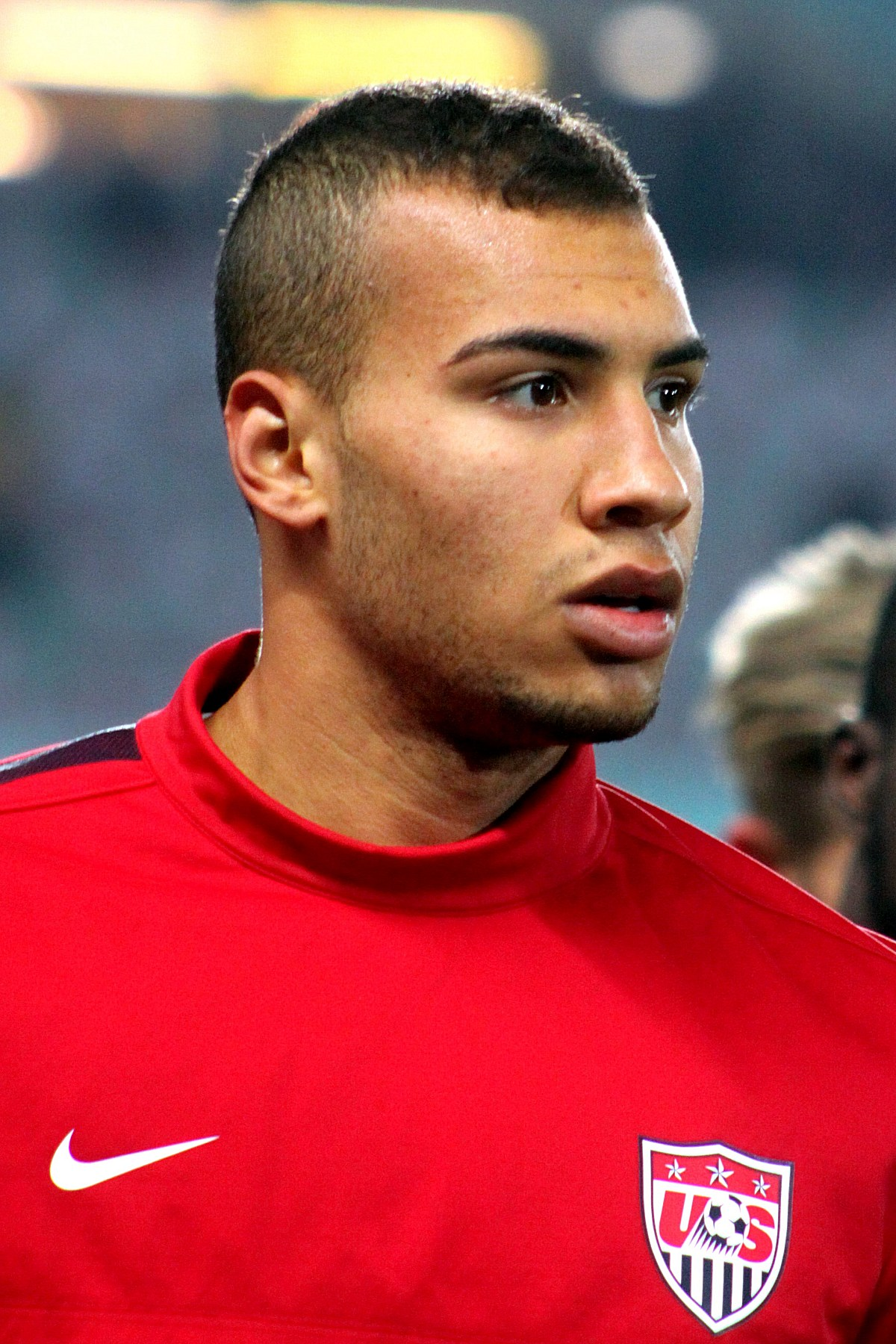
Brooks with the United States in November 2013

Brooks, who holds both German and American citizenship, participated in several camps for both the U.S. U-20 and U-23 team and in one for the Germany U20 team. He made his international debut for the U.S. Under-20 team in a 5–0 loss against Paraguay in September 2010.

In July 2013, German magazine kicker indicated that Brooks had received a call-up from the U.S. senior national team to feature in a friendly against Bosnia and Herzegovina. Brooks made his senior international debut in the 4–3 victory over Bosnia. Brooks was named in the United States's final 23-man roster for the 2014 FIFA World Cup. In the opening group match against Ghana, he came on as a halftime injury substitute for Matt Besler and scored the winning goal in the 2–1 victory, a header off Graham Zusi's corner kick. He became the first American to score as a substitute at the World Cup.

On June 5, 2015, Brooks scored in a friendly against the Netherlands in Amsterdam as the United States fought back from a 1–3 deficit to win 4–3, their first victory against the Dutch. Later that month, he was named in coach Jürgen Klinsmann's squad for the 2015 CONCACAF Gold Cup, playing four matches as the team finished fourth.

Klinsmann also called Brooks up for the Copa América Centenario, the centenary edition of the Copa América held in the United States in 2016. He played all five matches as the nation lost 4–0 to Argentina in the semi-finals, but did not take part in the bronze medal match loss to Colombia.

== Career statistics ==
=== Club ===
As of match played May 18, 2026

Appearances and goals by club, season and competition
Club	Season	League			National cup (Note: Includes DFB-Pokal and Taça de Portugal)		League cup (Note: Includes Taça da Liga)		Continental		Other		Total	
Club	Season	Division	Apps	Goals	Apps	Goals	Apps	Goals	Apps	Goals	Apps	Goals	Apps	Goals
Hertha BSC II	2010–11	Regionalliga Nord	16	0	—		—		—		—		16	0
Hertha BSC II	2011–12	Regionalliga Nord	15	0	—		—		—		—		15	0
Hertha BSC II	2013–14	Regionalliga Nordost	3	2	—		—		—		—		3	2
Hertha BSC II	2014–15	Regionalliga Nordost	2	0	—		—		—		—		2	0
Hertha BSC II	2015–16	Regionalliga Nordost	1	0	—		—		—		—		1	0
Hertha BSC II	Total		37	2	—		—		—		—		37	2
Hertha BSC	2012–13	2. Bundesliga	29	1	—		—		—		—		29	1
Hertha BSC	2013–14	Bundesliga	16	2	1	0	—		—		—		17	2
Hertha BSC	2014–15	Bundesliga	27	1	1	0	—		—		—		28	1
Hertha BSC	2015–16	Bundesliga	23	1	4	1	—		—		—		27	2
Hertha BSC	2016–17	Bundesliga	24	2	3	0	—		2 (Note: Appearances in UEFA Europa League)	0	—		29	2
Hertha BSC	Total		119	7	9	1	—		2	0	—		130	8
VfL Wolfsburg	2017–18	Bundesliga	9	0	1	0	—		—		2 (Note: Appearances in Bundesliga relegation play-offs)	0	12	0
VfL Wolfsburg	2018–19	Bundesliga	29	3	3	0	—		—		—		32	3
VfL Wolfsburg	2019–20	Bundesliga	25	0	1	0	—		5	1	—		31	1
VfL Wolfsburg	2020–21	Bundesliga	32	2	2	0	—		1	0	—		35	2
VfL Wolfsburg	2021–22	Bundesliga	31	1	1	0	—		4 (Note: Appearances in UEFA Champions League)	0	—		36	1
VfL Wolfsburg	Total		126	6	8	0	—		10	1	2	0	146	7
Benfica	2022–23	Primeira Liga	2	0	1	0	2	0	—		—		5	0
TSG Hoffenheim	2022–23	Bundesliga	15	0	1	0	—		—		—		16	0
TSG Hoffenheim	2023–24	Bundesliga	21	2	2	0	—		—		—		23	2
TSG Hoffenheim	Total		36	2	3	0	—		—		—		39	2
Hertha BSC	2025–26	2. Bundesliga	1	0	0	0	—		—		—		1	0
Career total			321	17	21	1	2	0	12	1	2	0	358	19

=== International ===
Scores and results list United States' goal tally first, score column indicates score after each Brooks goal.

List of international goals scored by John Brooks
No.	Date	Venue	Cap	Opponent	Score	Result	Competition
1	June 16, 2014	Arena das Dunas, Natal, Brazil	5	Ghana	2–1	2–1	2014 FIFA World Cup
2	June 5, 2015	Amsterdam Arena, Amsterdam, Netherlands	11	Netherlands	2–3	4–3	Friendly
3	May 28, 2016	Children's Mercy Park, Kansas City, United States	21	Bolivia	2–0	4–0	Friendly

== Honors ==
Hertha BSC

- 2. Bundesliga: 2013–14

Benfica

- Primeira Liga: 2022–23

United States

- CONCACAF Nations League: 2019–20

Individual

- IFFHS CONCACAF Team of the Decade: 2011–2020
- CONCACAF Nations League Finals Best XI: 2021
