= Sandro Wagner =

German football player and manager

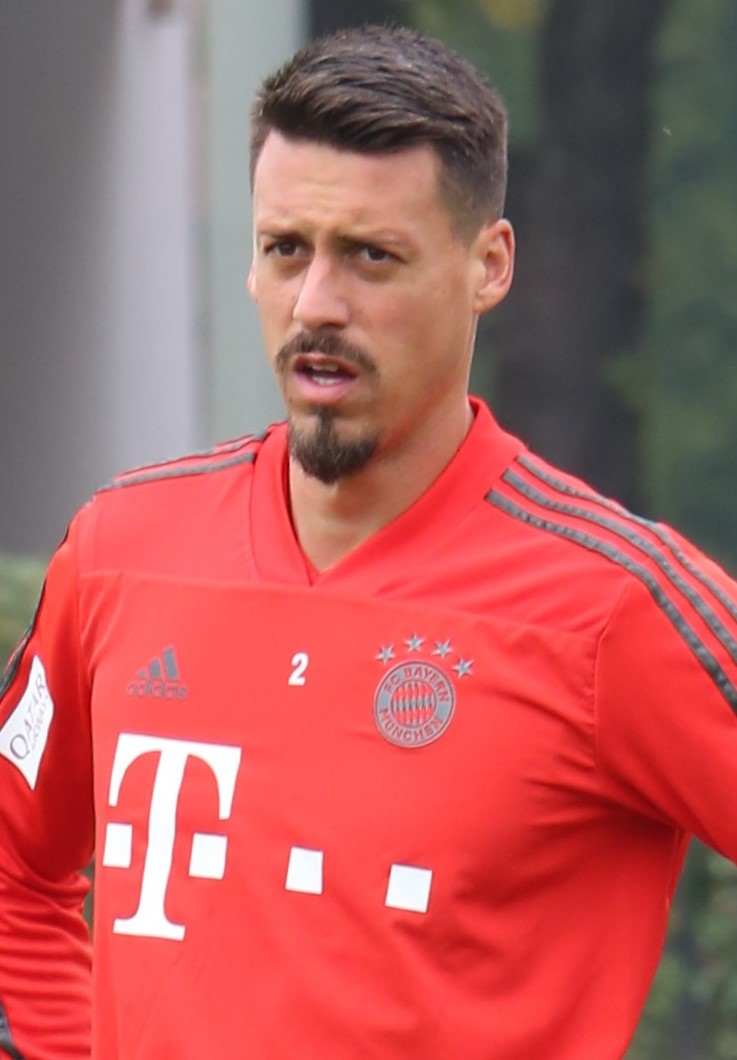
- Wagner with Bayern Munich in 2018

Personal information
- Full name: Sandro Wagner
- Date of birth: 29 November 1987 (age 38)
- Place of birth: Munich, West Germany
- Height: 1.94 m (6 ft 4 in)
- Position: Striker

Team information
- Current team: Hannover 96 (manager)

Youth career
- 1990–1995: Hertha Munich
- 1995–2006: Bayern Munich

Senior career*
Years	Team	Apps	(Gls)
2006–2008	Bayern Munich II	44	(2)
2007–2008	Bayern Munich	4	(0)
2008–2010	MSV Duisburg	36	(12)
2010–2012	Werder Bremen II	18	(7)
2010–2012	Werder Bremen	30	(5)
2012	→ 1. FC Kaiserslautern (loan)	11	(0)
2012–2015	Hertha BSC II	3	(1)
2012–2015	Hertha BSC	71	(7)
2015–2016	Darmstadt 98	32	(14)
2016–2017	1899 Hoffenheim	42	(15)
2018–2019	Bayern Munich	21	(8)
2019–2020	Tianjin TEDA	26	(12)
Total		338	(83)

International career
2008–2009	Germany U21	8	(4)
2017–2018	Germany	8	(5)

Managerial career
- 2021–2023: SpVgg Unterhaching
- 2025: FC Augsburg
- 2026–: Hannover 96
Medal record
Representing Germany
UEFA European Under-21 Championship
Winner	2009
FIFA Confederations Cup
Winner	2017
- * Club domestic league appearances and goals

Sandro Wagner (German pronunciation: [ˈzandʁo ˈvaːɡnɐ]; born 29 November 1987) is a German professional football manager of Hannover 96 and former player who played as a striker.

He began his career at Bayern Munich, but made only eight appearances in his first spell at the club. He subsequently represented MSV Duisburg of the 2. Bundesliga and Werder Bremen, Hertha BSC, Darmstadt 98 and 1899 Hoffenheim of the Bundesliga before returning to Bayern in 2018. After a year there, he joined Chinese club Tianjin TEDA before retiring in 2020.

Wagner was part of the German side that won the 2009 UEFA European Under-21 Championship. He earned eight caps and scored five goals for the senior national team, winning the 2017 FIFA Confederations Cup.

Wagner was the head coach of SpVgg Unterhaching from 2021 to 2023, leaving the club after a successful promotion to the 3. Liga. He subsequently joined the German U20 national team as an assistant manager and later also the senior team. In 2025, he became the manager of Augsburg.

== Club career ==
=== Early career ===
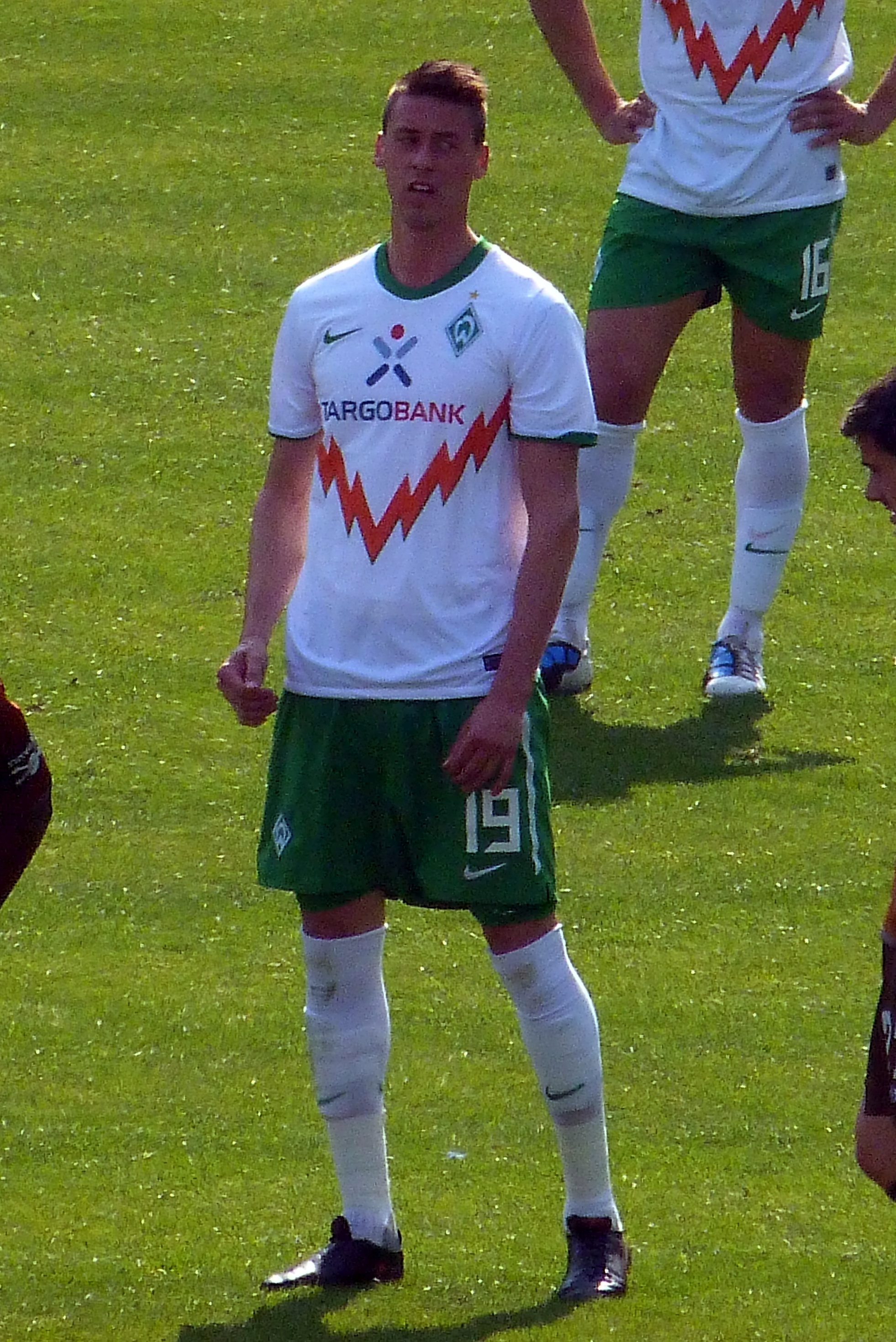
Wagner with Werder Bremen in 2011

Wagner scored his first goal for Bayern Munich in a 2–0 victory over VfB Stuttgart in the 2007 DFL-Ligapokal, a six team pre-season tournament composing of the top four Bundesliga teams, the winners of the German Cup and the first-place team from the 2. Bundesliga. Wagner started the match in place of the ill Miroslav Klose. He assisted the first goal of the match for Franck Ribéry and scored himself in the 66th minute. He also made appearances for the reserve team during the 2005–06, 2006–07, and 2007–08 seasons.

On 10 June 2008, Wagner moved to MSV Duisburg before signing for Werder Bremen on 31 January 2010. During the 2008–09 season, Wagner scored nine goals in 32 matches. During the 2009–10 season, Wagner scored five goals in seven matches.

On 19 January 2012, Wagner was loaned to Kaiserslautern.

=== Hertha BSC and Darmstadt ===
He then played for Hertha BSC and Hertha BSC II from 2012 to 2015. He scored six goals in 32 matches for Hertha and one goal in one match for the reserve team during the 2012–13 season. He scored two goals in 25 matches for Hertha in the 2013–14 season. He also played a match for the reserve team without scoring a goal. In his final season with Hertha, he played 16 matches for the first team and one match for the reserve team without scoring a goal for either team.

On 8 August 2015, Wagner signed for Darmstadt 98. During the 2015–16 season, Wagner scored 15 goals in 34 matches played.

=== 1899 Hoffenheim ===
On 30 June 2016, Wagner joined fellow Bundesliga club 1899 Hoffenheim by signing a contract until June 2019. He was presented the same day, and took squad number 14, stating: “Hoffenheim are a great club and their ambition impressed me straight away.”

He made his competitive debut with the team on 28 August 2016 in the opening Bundesliga matchday against newcomers of RB Leipzig which ended in a 2–2 home draw. He opened his scoring account in the second matchday against Mainz 05, netting his team's first goal as Hoffenheim came from three goals down to earn a 4–4 away draw.

On 31 March 2017, he had his finger dislocated after a clash with Hertha captain Vedad Ibišević, nevertheless he went on to play until the end of the match, also assisting Andrej Kramarić for the third goal in an eventual 1–3 away win. Wagner finished his first Hoffenheim season by netting eleven league goals in 31 appearances, 30 of them as starter, adding two cup appearances and one goal, being important for Julian Nagelsmann's side that finished the league undefeated at home, securing a spot in Champions League play-off round for next season.

On 9 July 2017, Wagner agreed a contract extension, adding one more year to his current contract. During the 2017–18 season, before transferring to Bayern, Wagner scored six goals in 17 matches.

=== Return to Bayern Munich ===
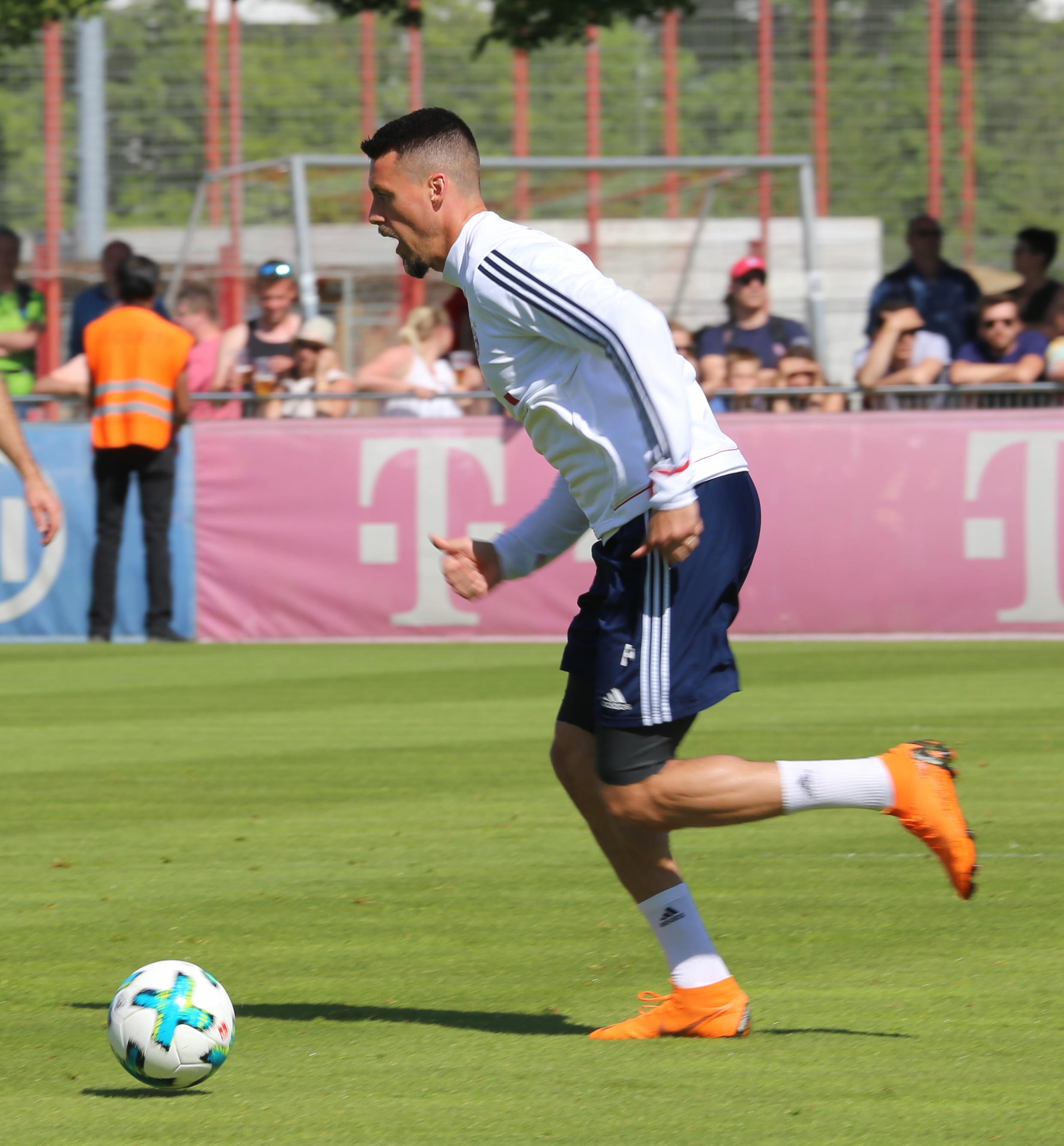
Wagner training with Bayern Munich in 2018

On 21 December 2017, it was announced that Wagner would transfer to Bayern Munich on 1 January 2018. He signed a contract until 2020.

Wagner's first match since his return was when he came on as a substitute against Bayer Leverkusen on 12 January 2018. He opened his scoring account on 27 January by netting the last goal of a 5–2 home win over his former side 1899 Hoffenheim. He played his first match as starter the next week in the 2–0 away win against Mainz. Wagner scored his second ever UEFA Champions League goal, the first in Bayern colours, on 14 March in the second leg of round of 16 versus Beşiktaş as Bayern won 3–1 at Vodafone Park and progressed 8–1 on aggregate.

Wagner started the 2018–19 season by coming in as a substitute in a 5–0 win in the 2018 DFL-Supercup. During the 2018–19 season with Bayern, he scored one goal in 12 appearances in all competitions.

=== Tianjin TEDA ===
Although his contract with Bayern was supposed to expire in 2020, he asked for it to be terminated due to his growing frustrations with his playing time on the pitch. On 30 January 2019, Wagner transferred to Chinese Super League club Tianjin TEDA for €5 million. Bayern sporting director, Hasan Salihamidzic, said that he "has a very attractive offer from China and we have met his request" and he thanked Wagner for "spending time with FC Bayern" and wished him "all the best and much success for his future in China". In his first season, he scored 12 goals in 26 matches played. On 24 July 2020, Wagner terminated his contract with Tianjin TEDA.

=== Retirement ===
Wagner announced his retirement on 2 August 2020. Overall he scored more than 60 goals in the two top divisions of German pro football.

== International career ==
=== Youth ===
Wagner earned eight caps for Germany at under-21 level, scoring four goals, including two in the final of the 2009 UEFA European Under-21 Championship in Sweden where Germany beat England 4–0.

=== Senior ===
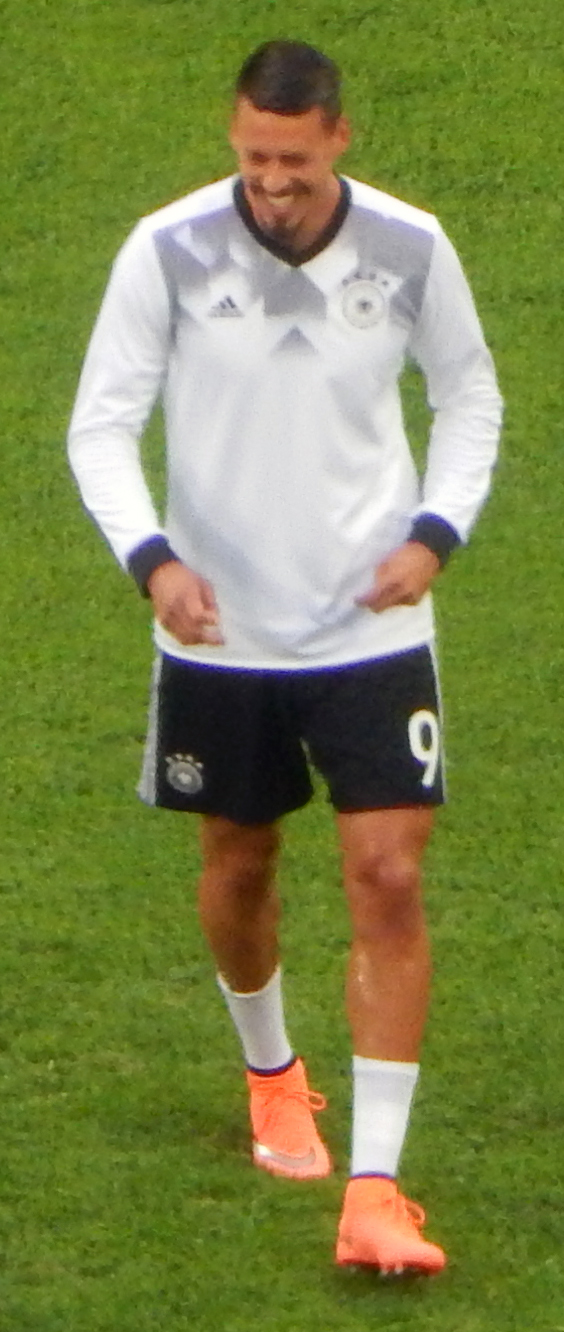
Wagner with Germany in 2017

In June 2017, Wagner received his first call-up to the senior national team for a friendly against Denmark and a FIFA World Cup qualifying match against San Marino. He made his competitive debut on 6 June in the 1–1 away draw against Denmark, playing for more than 60 minutes. Four days later, he scored a hat-trick as Germany thrashed San Marino 7–0. His performance was praised by national team manager Joachim Löw.

Wagner was also part of the 2017 FIFA Confederations Cup squad that won the tournament. His first and only appearance came on 19 June in the opening Group B match against Australia, missing several good chances to score as Germany won 3–2. After that, he was benched in favour of Timo Werner and Lars Stindl as Germany defeated Chile 1–0 in the final. Wagner finished 2017 by scoring against Northern Ireland and Azerbaijan.

On 16 May 2018, after being left out from Germany's World Cup squad, Wagner announced his retirement from international football.

== Coaching career ==
=== SpVgg Unterhaching ===
In March 2021, Wagner was first announced as new head coach of the youth (Under-19) team of SpVgg Unterhaching. However, on 25 June 2021, he was presented as head coach of the first team starting on 1 July 2021. Unterhaching started the 2021–22 Regionalliga season with a 0–0 draw against TSV Aubstadt. Unterhaching was knocked out of the Bavarian Cup in the second round by TSV Buchbach. Unterhaching finished the 2021–22 Regionalliga Bayern in fourth place. Unterhaching started the 2022–23 Regionalliga season on 14 July 2022 against Buchbach which Unterhaching won 3–1. Unterhaching were knocked out of the Bavarian Cup in the first round by TuS Feuchtwangen. On 6 May 2023, Unterhaching won the Regionalliga Bayern championship. Wagner announced his departure, before gaining promotion to the 3. Liga.

=== Germany (assistant) ===
In June 2023, Wagner became Hannes Wolf's assistant coach at the German U20 national team. On 10 September 2023, both Wagner and Wolf were named as assistant coaches at the German senior national team to Rudi Völler, who served as interim manager for their friendly against France. He was later appointed as assistant along with Benjamin Glück to newly appointed manager Julian Nagelsmann for the upcoming UEFA Euro 2024.

=== FC Augsburg ===
On 28 May 2025, Wagner was appointed the new head coach of Bundesliga club FC Augsburg, signing a contract until 2028. His tenure ended early on 1 December 2025, lasting just 12 league fixtures.

=== Hannover 96 ===
In September 2026, he was named the new head coach of Hannover 96.

== Style of play ==
Wagner was known for aerial power and strength, and was distinguished as a hard-working player. He was also physically imposing and direct, and praised as a striker who could "wreak havoc" in defences. Speaking in June 2017, Germany manager Joachim Löw stated that Wagner had "maturity and personality and one who stands by his own opinion".

== Career statistics ==
=== Club ===
Appearances and goals by club, season and competition
Club	Season	League			National Cup		Continental		Other		Total		Ref.
Club	Season	Division	Apps	Goals	Apps	Goals	Apps	Goals	Apps	Goals	Apps	Goals	Ref.
Bayern Munich II	2005–06	Regionalliga Süd	1	0	—		—		—		1	0	
Bayern Munich II	2006–07	Regionalliga Süd	30	2	—		—		—		30	2	
Bayern Munich II	2007–08	Regionalliga Süd	13	0	—		—		—		13	0	
Bayern Munich II	Total		44	2	—		—		—		44	2	
Bayern Munich	2007–08	Bundesliga	4	0	0	0	1 (Note: Appearances in UEFA Europa League)	0	3 (Note: Appearances in DFL-Ligapokal)	1	8	1	
MSV Duisburg	2008–09	2. Bundesliga	30	7	2	2	—		—		32	9	
MSV Duisburg	2009–10	2. Bundesliga	6	5	1	0	—		—		7	5	
MSV Duisburg	Total		36	12	3	2	—		—		39	14	
Werder Bremen II	2009–10	3. Liga	7	3	—		—		—		7	3	
Werder Bremen II	2010–11	3. Liga	2	1	—		—		—		2	1	
Werder Bremen II	2011–12	3. Liga	9	3	—		—		—		9	3	
Werder Bremen II	Total		18	7	—		—		—		18	7	
Werder Bremen	2010–11	Bundesliga	23	5	1	0	4 (Note: Appearances in UEFA Champions League)	0	—		28	5	
Werder Bremen	2011–12	Bundesliga	7	0	1	0	—		—		8	0	
Werder Bremen	Total		30	5	2	0	4	0	—		36	5	
Kaiserslautern	2011–12	Bundesliga	11	0	0	0	—		—		11	0	
Hertha BSC II	2012–13	Regionalliga Nordost	1	1	—		—		—		1	1	
Hertha BSC II	2013–14	Regionalliga Nordost	1	0	—		—		—		1	0	
Hertha BSC II	2014–15	Regionalliga Nordost	1	0	—		—		—		1	0	
Hertha BSC II	Total		3	1	—		—		—		3	1	
Hertha BSC	2012–13	2. Bundesliga	31	5	1	1	—		—		32	6	
Hertha BSC	2013–14	Bundesliga	25	2	2	0	—		—		27	2	
Hertha BSC	2014–15	Bundesliga	15	0	1	0	—		—		16	0	
Hertha BSC	Total		71	7	4	1	—		—		75	8	
Darmstadt 98	2015–16	Bundesliga	32	14	2	1	—		—		34	15	
1899 Hoffenheim	2016–17	Bundesliga	31	11	2	1	—		—		33	12	
1899 Hoffenheim	2017–18	Bundesliga	11	4	1	0	5	2	—		17	6	
1899 Hoffenheim	Total		42	15	3	1	5	2	—		50	18	
Bayern Munich	2017–18	Bundesliga	14	8	1	0	3	1	0	0	18	9	
Bayern Munich	2018–19	Bundesliga	7	0	1	1	3	0	1 (Note: Appearance in DFL-Supercup)	0	12	1	
Bayern Munich	Total		21	8	2	1	6	1	1	0	30	10	
Tianjin TEDA	2019	Chinese Super League	26	12	0	0	—		—		26	12	
Career total			338	83	16	6	16	3	4	1	374	93	

=== International ===
Appearances and goals by national team and year
National team	Year	Apps	Goals
Germany
Germany	2017	7	5
Germany	2018	1	0
Total		8	5

Germany score listed first, score column indicates score after each Wagner goal.

List of international goals scored by Sandro Wagner
No.	Date	Venue	Opponent	Score	Result	Competition
1	10 June 2017	Stadion Nürnberg, Nuremberg, Germany	San Marino	2–0	7–0	2018 FIFA World Cup qualification
2	10 June 2017	Stadion Nürnberg, Nuremberg, Germany	San Marino	3–0	7–0	2018 FIFA World Cup qualification
3	10 June 2017	Stadion Nürnberg, Nuremberg, Germany	San Marino	7–0	7–0	2018 FIFA World Cup qualification
4	5 October 2017	Windsor Park, Belfast, Northern Ireland	Northern Ireland	2–0	3–1	2018 FIFA World Cup qualification
5	8 October 2017	Fritz-Walter-Stadion, Kaiserslautern, Germany	Azerbaijan	2–1	5–1	2018 FIFA World Cup qualification

=== Managerial ===
As of match played 29 November 2025

Team	From	To	Record					Ref.
Team	From	To	G	W	D	L	Win %	Ref.
SpVgg Unterhaching	1 July 2021	30 June 2023	80	48	15	17	60.00	
Augsburg	1 July 2025	1 December 2025	14	4	1	9	28.57	
Total			94	52	16	26	55.32	—

== Honours ==
Player

Bayern Munich

- Bundesliga: 2007–08, 2017–18
- DFL-Ligapokal: 2007
- DFL-Supercup: 2018

Germany U21

- UEFA European Under-21 Championship: 2009

Germany

- FIFA Confederations Cup: 2017

Manager

SpVgg Unterhaching

- Regionalliga Bayern: 2022–23
