= Thomas Hopfer =

Austrian footballer

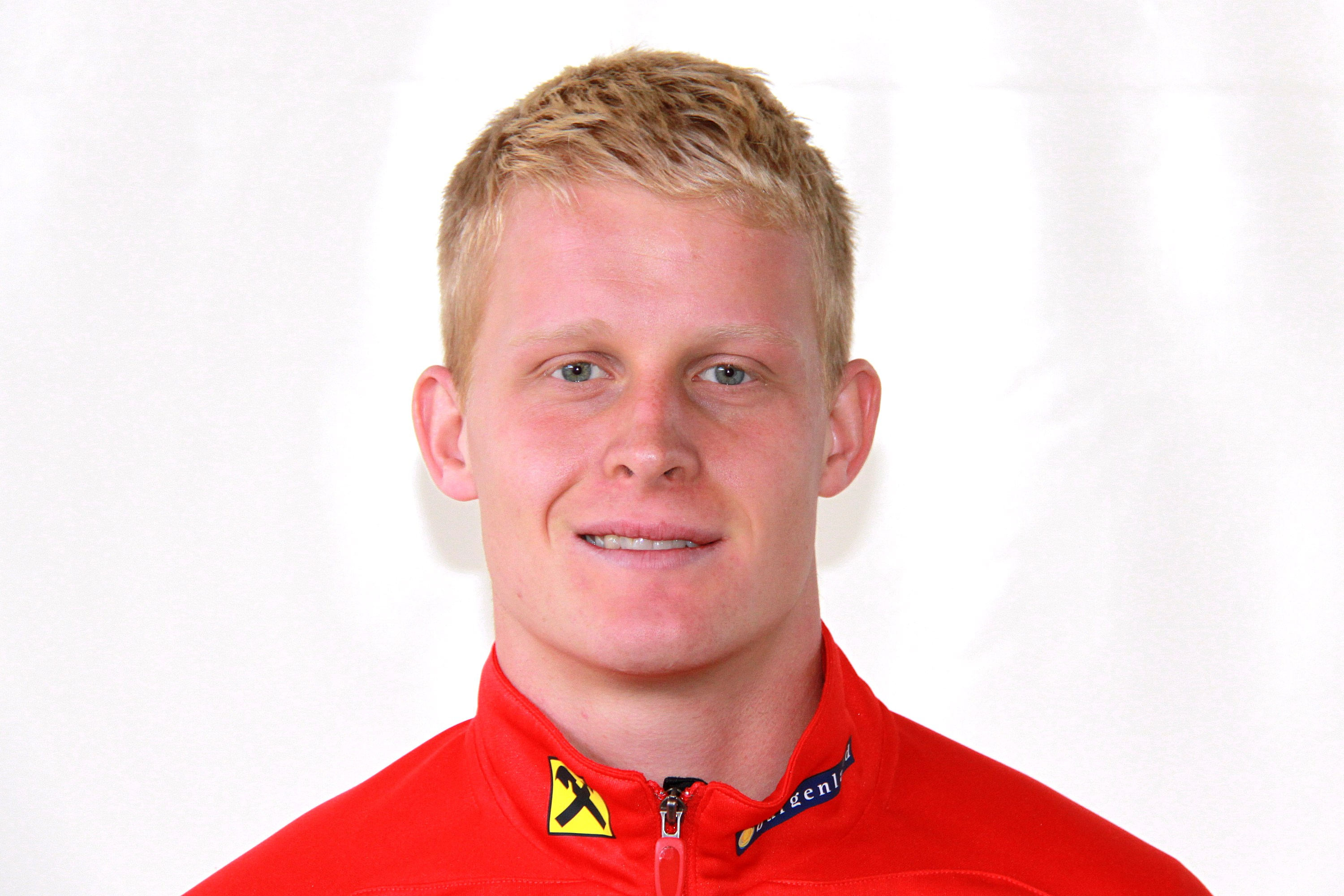
- Hopfer in 2010

Personal information
- Full name: Thomas Hopfer
- Date of birth: 20 April 1990 (age 36)
- Place of birth: Austria
- Height: 1.74 m (5 ft 8 1/2 in)
- Position: Defensive midfielder

Senior career*
Years	Team	Apps	(Gls)
2007–2009	Grazer AK	7	(0)
2008–2009	Admira A	21	(0)
2009	Admira	1	(0)
2009–2011	TSV Hartberg	48	(1)
2011–2012	SV Grödig	19	(0)
2012–2014	TSV Hartberg	63	(3)
2014–2016	USV Allerheiligen	49	(3)
2016–2017	SC Weiz	29	(1)
2017–2018	USV Allerheiligen	29	(0)
2018–2019	Gleisdorf 09	12	(0)

International career
2007	Austria U-18	2	(0)
2008–2009	Austria U-19	8	(1)
2009–2010	Austria U-20	5	(0)
2010–2011	Austria U-21	12	(0)
- * Club domestic league appearances and goals as of 23:27, 12 September 2014 (UTC)

Thomas Hopfer (born 20 April 1990) is an Austrian professional footballer.
