= Dorian Diring =

French footballer (born 1992)

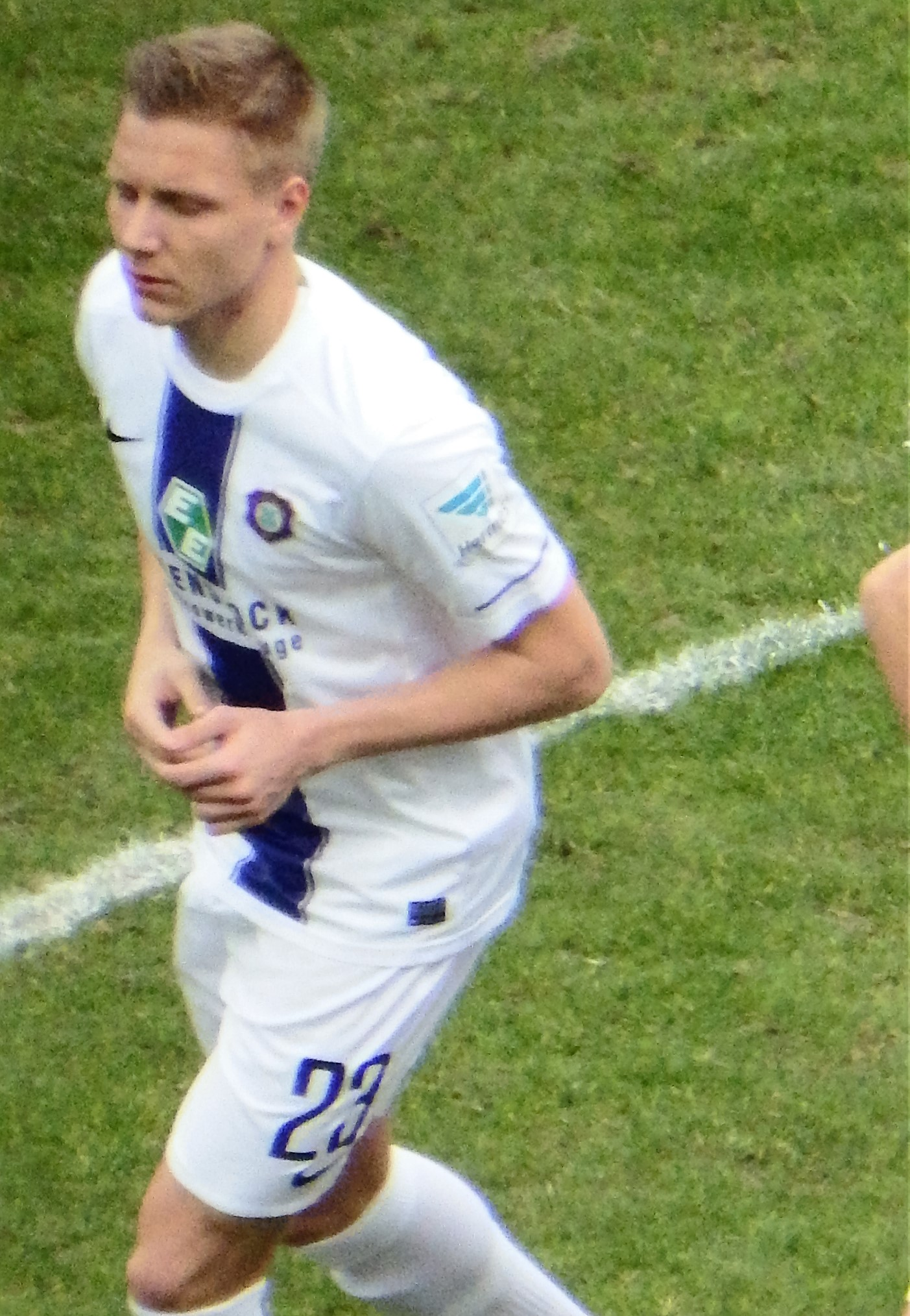
- Diring in 2015

Personal information
- Full name: Dorian Diring
- Date of birth: 11 April 1992 (age 34)
- Place of birth: Mulhouse, France
- Height: 1.80 m (5 ft 11 in)
- Position: Midfielder

Senior career*
Years	Team	Apps	(Gls)
2010–2012	Mulhouse	29	(2)
2012–2013	Hertha BSC II	20	(2)
2013–2015	Erzgebirge Aue	27	(0)
2015–2017	Hallescher FC	48	(5)
2017–2021	Waldhof Mannheim	84	(12)
- * Club domestic league appearances and goals as of 10 August 2021

Dorian Diring (born 11 April 1992) is a French professional footballer who plays as a midfielder. He is currently without a club.
