= Adrián Ramos =

Colombian footballer (born 1986)

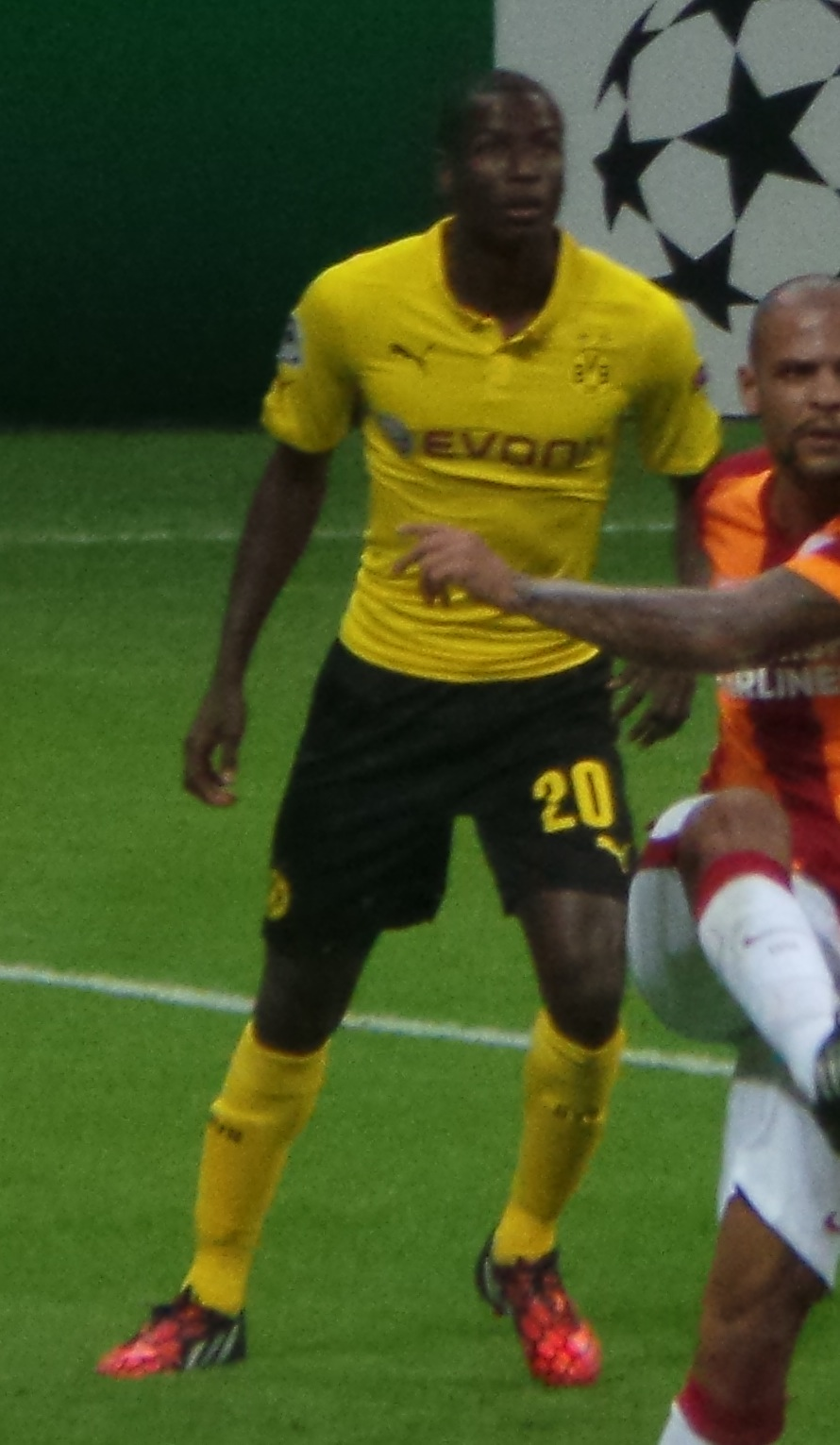
- Ramos with Borussia Dortmund in 2014

Personal information
- Full name: Gustavo Adrián Ramos Vásquez
- Date of birth: 22 January 1986 (age 40)
- Place of birth: Santander de Quilichao, Colombia
- Height: 1.85 m (6 ft 1 in)
- Position: Striker

Team information
- Current team: América de Cali
- Number: 20

Youth career
- 2004: América de Cali

Senior career*
Years	Team	Apps	(Gls)
2004–2009	América de Cali	84	(35)
2005	→ Trujillanos (loan)	23	(8)
2006–2007	→ Santa Fe (loan)	31	(5)
2009–2014	Hertha BSC	157	(60)
2014–2017	Borussia Dortmund	52	(13)
2017	→ Granada (loan)	14	(4)
2017–2018	Chongqing Lifan	0	(0)
2017–2018	→ Granada (loan)	26	(5)
2018–2020	Granada	17	(4)
2020–	América de Cali	179	(50)

International career^{‡}
2008–2016	Colombia	37	(4)
- * Club domestic league appearances and goals as of 11 December 2025 ‡ National team caps and goals as of 31 October 2023

Gustavo Adrián Ramos Vásquez (Spanish pronunciation: [aˈðɾjan ˈramos]; born 22 January 1986), commonly known as Adrián Ramos, is a Colombian footballer who plays as a striker for América de Cali.

He made his debut for the Colombia national football team in 2008 and has represented them 37 times, including at the 2011 Copa América and the 2014 FIFA World Cup.

== Club career ==
=== Early career ===
Ramos started his career at América de Cali in 2004, but was sent out on loan to Trujillanos and Santa Fe in consecutive seasons. Ramos returned to América de Cali for the 2008 season and was one of the key players in their 2008 Finalizacion championship, scoring in their 4–1 aggregate victory over Independiente Medellín in the finals.

=== Hertha Berlin ===
On 30 August 2009, he joined Hertha BSC in Germany after the clubs agreed a fee in the region of €2 million.

His first goal for Hertha came in the second round of the DFB Pokal on 22 September 2009, helping the club come back from 0–2 down to level at 2–2, only to lose in a penalty shoot-out. His first Bundesliga goal came against Stuttgart on 12 November, putting his side ahead before a late Zdravko Kuzmanović strike ensured a 1–1 draw. On 13 December 2013, Ramos scored two goals in nine minutes as Hertha came from 0–1 down to defeat Werder Bremen 3–2. In the 2013–14 Bundesliga season, he had his best season to date with Hertha, contributing 16 goals, the joint fourth most in the league.

=== Borussia Dortmund ===
On 9 April 2014, it was announced that Ramos would sign for Borussia Dortmund, joining them on 1 July 2014, moving for an undisclosed fee and penning a four-year contract with the club. Ramos went on to say that he was looking forward to joining his new team, while also stating that he hoped to fill the void left by Robert Lewandowski for the fans.

Ramos made his Dortmund debut on 13 August 2014, coming on as a second-half substitute in Dortmund's 2–0 victory over Bayern Munich in the DFL Supercup. His first Dortmund goal came three days later, scoring Dortmund's final goal of their 4–1 victory over Stuttgart Kickers in the first round of the DFB Pokal. On 29 August, Ramos scored his first league goal for Borussia Dortmund against FC Augsburg, resulting in a 3–2 win, Dortmund's first of the Bundesliga season. On 13 September, Ramos scored his second goal for Dortmund against SC Freiburg and also provided an assist for Shinji Kagawa in a 3–1 win. He scored his first goals in Europe for Dortmund on 1 October, scoring twice after coming on as a substitute in a 3–0 win against Anderlecht in the Champions League.

=== Granada (loan) ===
Ramos was loaned out to Granada during the winter transfer window on 24 January 2017.

=== Chongqing Lifan ===
Borussia Dortmund announced that Ramos was due to join Chongqing Lifan on 30 June 2017. A fee of €12 million was reported to have been agreed over his transfer.

=== Granada ===
In 2018, Ramos signed with Granada after two loan spells.

=== Return to América de Cali ===
On 1 January 2020, Ramos returned to Colombia to sign with América de Cali. He was part of the squad that won the 2020 championship, helping America win their first title since 2008, the last time Ramos was part of the squad.

== International career ==
He played for Colombia U-17 in the 2003 World Cup and scored three goals. This helped Colombia finish fourth. He received a full international call-up and started for Colombia on 20 August 2008 in a friendly against Ecuador in New Jersey.

On 2 July 2011, Ramos scored the only goal of the game just before half time against Costa Rica in the group stage of the 2011 Copa América in Argentina.

Ramos was included in Colombia's squad for the 2014 FIFA World Cup, their first appearance in the tournament since 1998. He made his first appearance by starting in the last group game with the team already qualified, playing the whole 90 minutes as Colombia beat Japan 4–1. He came on as a substitute in both knockout games as Colombia eventually fell at the quarter-finals, their best performance to date.

=== International goals ===
Scores and results lists Colombia's goal tally first.

#	Date	Venue	Opponent	Score	Result	Competition
1.	14 October 2009	Defensores del Chaco, Asunción, Paraguay	Paraguay	1–0	2–0	2010 FIFA World Cup qualification
2.	2 July 2011	Estadio 23 de Agosto, San Salvador de Jujuy, Argentina	Costa Rica	1–0	1–0	2011 Copa América
3.	18 November 2014	Stožice Stadium, Ljubljana, Slovenia	Slovenia	1–0	1–0	Friendly
4.	26 March 2015	Bahrain National Stadium, Riffa, Bahrain	Bahrain	4–0	6–0	Friendly

== Career statistics ==
Updated 23 December 2016.

Club	Season	League		National Cup^{1}		Continental^{2}		Total	
Club	Season	Apps	Goals	Apps	Goals	Apps	Goals	Apps	Goals
América de Cali	2008	46	21	—		6	2	52	23
América de Cali	2009	19	13	—		4	0	23	13
Total		65	34	—		10	2	75	36
Hertha BSC	2009–10	29	10	1	1	7	0	37	11
Hertha BSC	2010–11	33	15	2	2	—		35	17
Hertha BSC	2011–12	31	6	6	4	—		37	10
Hertha BSC	2012–13	32	11	1	0	—		33	11
Hertha BSC	2013–14	32	16	2	0	—		34	16
Total		157	58	12	7	7	0	176	65
Borussia Dortmund	2014–15	18	2	5	1	6	3	29	6
Borussia Dortmund	2015–16	27	9	3	1	9	0	39	10
Borussia Dortmund	2016–17	7	2	2	0	2	1	11	3
Total		52	13	10	2	16	4	79	19
Career total		274	105	22	9	33	6	330	120

^{1}Refers as Copa Colombia, Bundesliga Relegation play-off, DFB-Pokal and DFL-Supercup.

^{2}Refers as Copa Libertadores, Copa Sudamericana, UEFA Champions League and Europa League.

== Honours ==
=== Club ===
América de Cali

- Categoría Primera A (2): 2008-II, 2020

Hertha Berlin

- 2. Bundesliga (2): 2010–11, 2012–13

Borussia Dortmund

- DFL-Supercup (1): 2014
