= Philip Sprint =

German footballer

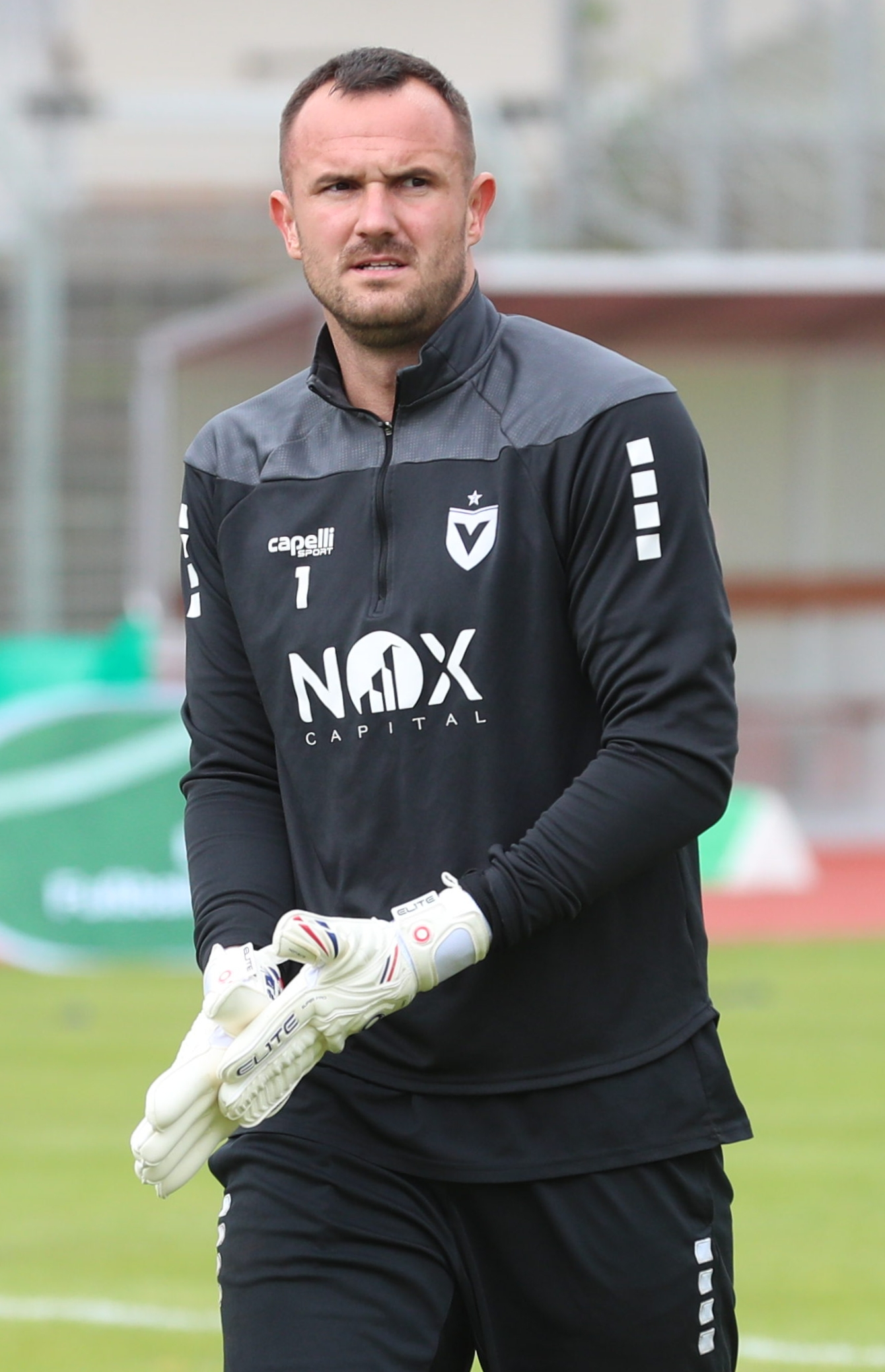

Personal information
- Date of birth: 27 June 1993 (age 33)
- Place of birth: Berlin, Germany
- Height: 1.96 m (6 ft 5 in)
- Position: Goalkeeper

Team information
- Current team: Hertha BSC II
- Number: 1

Youth career
- 2002–2006: Nordberliner SC
- 2006–2011: Hertha BSC

Senior career*
Years	Team	Apps	(Gls)
2011–2015	Hertha BSC II	37	(0)
2012–2015	Hertha BSC	2	(0)
2015–2017	Alemannia Aachen	8	(0)
2017–2020	Hertha Zehlendorf	66	(0)
2020–2022	Viktoria Berlin	23	(0)
2022–	Hertha BSC II	2	(0)

Managerial career
- 2022–: Hertha BSC (youth gk coach)
- * Club domestic league appearances and goals as of 20:45, 12 December 2023 (UTC)

Philip Sprint (born 27 June 1993) is a German footballer who plays as a goalkeeper for Hertha BSC II.

== Career ==
=== Club career ===
Sprint made his professional debut for Hertha BSC on 12 August 2012, in a 2. Bundesliga match against FSV Frankfurt, coming on in the 50th minute for Marvin Knoll, after starting goalkeeper Sascha Burchert had been sent off.
