= Nico Burchert =

German footballer (born 1987)

Personal information
- Date of birth: 24 June 1987 (age 39)
- Place of birth: Berlin, East Germany
- Height: 1.92 m (6 ft 4 in)
- Position: Goalkeeper

Team information
- Current team: SC Paderborn (goalkeeping coach)

Youth career
- Wartenberger SV
- –2003: Union Berlin
- 2003–2006: Hertha BSC

Senior career*
Years	Team	Apps	(Gls)
2006–2008	Hertha BSC II	11	(0)
2008–2016	SC Paderborn	1	(0)
Total		12	(0)

Managerial career
- 2013–2016: SC Paderborn (youth goalkeeping coach)
- 2016–: SC Paderborn (goalkeeping coach)
- * Club domestic league appearances and goals

Nico Burchert (born 24 June 1987) is a German former professional footballer who played as a goalkeeper and works as goalkeeping coach for SC Paderborn.

== Playing career ==
Burchert started his senior career with Hertha BSC II. In the 2006–07 season he played five matches in the Regionalliga Nord, never managing to keep a clean sheet. For the 2007–08 season Hertha II were relegated to NOFV-Oberliga Nord. Burchert played six matches and kept four clean sheets. In July 2008 Burchert transferred to 3. Liga club SC Paderborn. He played his first match for the club and first fully professional game on 12 May 2009 in a 2–0 loss against Werder Bremen II.

== Coaching career ==
In June 2016, after having already served as goalkeeping coach for the youth teams of SC Paderborn, he was appointed the same role for the first team.

== Personal life ==
His brother Sascha currently plays as a goalkeeper for Hertha BSC.

== Career statistics ==
Appearances and goals by club, season and competition
Club	Season	League			National cup		Other		Total	
Club	Season	Division	Apps	Goals	Apps	Goals	Apps	Goals	Apps	Goals
Hertha BSC II	2006–07	Regionalliga Nord	5	0	—		—		—	
Hertha BSC II	2007–08	NOFV-Oberliga Nord	6	0	—		—		—	
Hertha BSC II	Total		11	0	—		—		11	0
SC Paderborn	2008–09	3. Liga	1	0	0	0	0	0	1	0
SC Paderborn	2009–10	2. Bundesliga	0	0	0	0	—		0	0
SC Paderborn	2010–11	2. Bundesliga	0	0	0	0	—		0	0
SC Paderborn	2011–12	2. Bundesliga	0	0	0	0	—		0	0
SC Paderborn	2012–13	2. Bundesliga	0	0	0	0	—		0	0
SC Paderborn	2013–14	2. Bundesliga	0	0	0	0	—		0	0
SC Paderborn	Total		1	0	0	0	0	0	1	0
Career total			12	0	0	0	0	0	12	0
