= Ronny (footballer, born 1986) =

Brazilian footballer

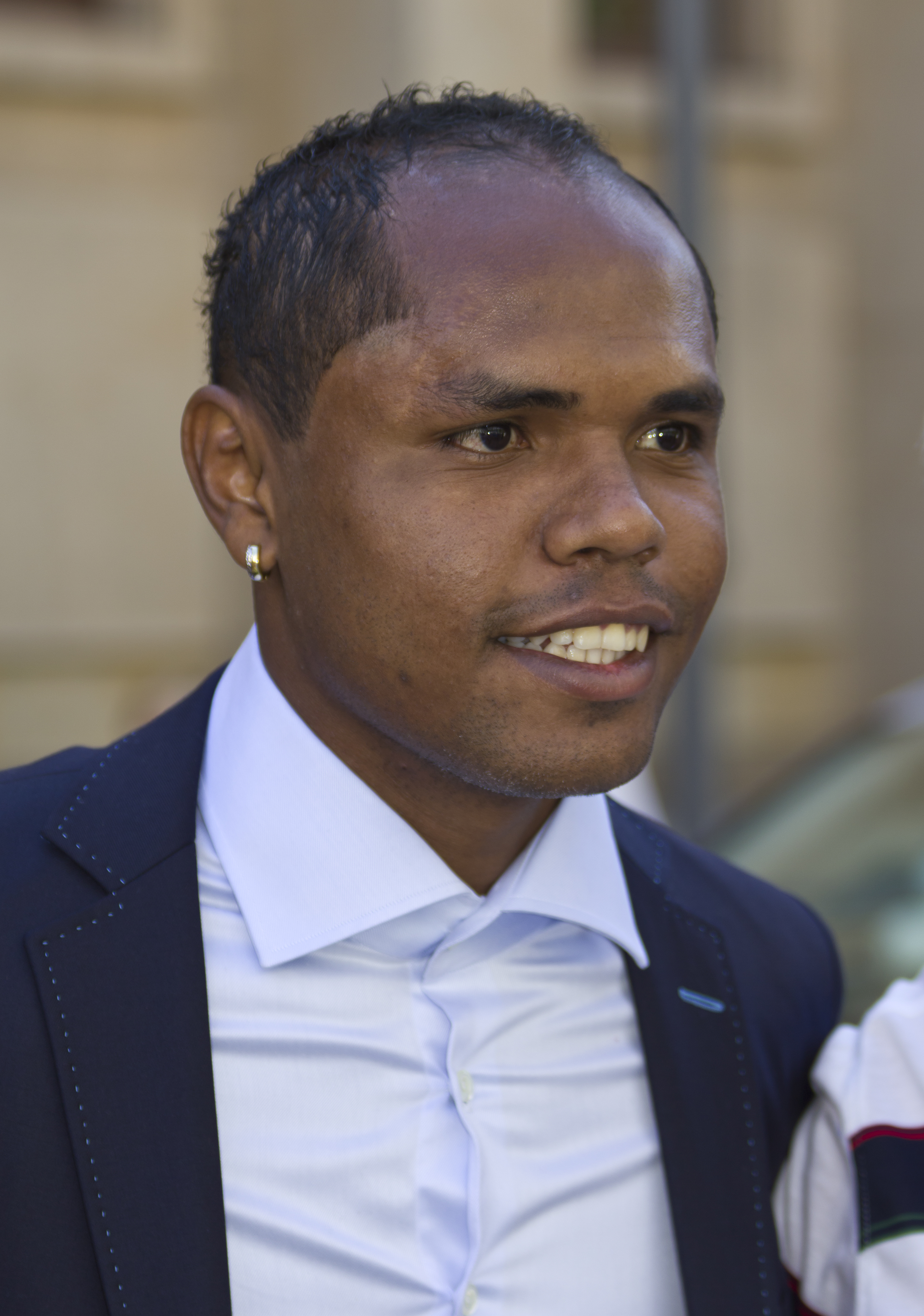
- Ronny in 2013

Personal information
- Full name: Ronny Heberson Furtado de Araújo
- Date of birth: 11 May 1986 (age 40)
- Place of birth: Fortaleza, Brazil
- Height: 1.75 m (5 ft 9 in)
- Position: Midfielder

Youth career
- AABB
- Fortaleza
- Juventus-SP
- 2003: Corinthians

Senior career*
Years	Team	Apps	(Gls)
2004–2006	Corinthians	6	(1)
2006–2010	Sporting CP	38	(1)
2009–2010	→ União Leiria (loan)	17	(3)
2010–2016	Hertha BSC	112	(27)
2015	Hertha BSC II	2	(0)
2017	Fortaleza	12	(3)
Total		187	(35)

International career
2003	Brazil U17	1	(0)
- * Club domestic league appearances and goals

Ronny Heberson Furtado de Araújo (born 11 May 1986), known simply as Ronny, is a Brazilian former professional footballer who mainly played as a midfielder.

He signed with Sporting CP at the age of 20, but could never impose himself in the first team. Subsequently, he played several seasons with Hertha BSC, having joined in 2010.

== Club career ==
=== Early years / Sporting ===
Born in Fortaleza, Ceará, Ronny began his professional career with Sport Club Corinthians Paulista, spending three seasons with the club but appearing mainly for the reserve team. After his contract ended in July 2006, he moved to Sporting CP.

Since joining Sporting, Ronny struggled to gain first-choice status: in the 2006–07 season, he battled with internationals Marco Caneira and Rodrigo Tello to finish with 12 Primeira Liga appearances, although he would score a memorable goal in an 88th minute 1–0 away win against Associação Naval 1º de Maio on 26 November 2006 – his free kick was unofficially measured according to some sources and YouTube at 211 km/h (131 mph).

Ronny began the 2007–08 campaign as starter, but with the arrival in January of Leandro Grimi from A.C. Milan lost his position, playing just six games in his third year. For 2009–10, only being third or fourth-choice at Sporting, he was loaned to U.D. Leiria, recently returned to the top division.

=== Hertha BSC ===
At the end of the loan, after helping Leiria stay up whilst contributing with three goals, Ronny transferred to German second tier club Hertha BSC, where his older brother Raffael was also playing. He made his Bundesliga debut on 17 September 2011, coming on as a substitute for Patrick Ebert in the last minutes of a 2–2 home draw against FC Augsburg.

For 2012–13, Ronny moved into a more attacking midfield position, left vacant after his sibling's departure. He scored a career-best 18 goals precisely in that season, helping his team return to the top flight after one year out.

On 31 August 2016, Ronny and director of football Michael Preetz mutually agreed to terminate the former's contract one year in advance, after he became surplus to requirements under head coach Pál Dárdai.

=== Fortaleza ===
On 17 March 2017, more than one decade after leaving for Europe, 30-year-old Ronny returned to his homeland and signed with local Fortaleza Esporte Clube, choosing to wear jersey number 52 as an homage to his father Caetano, who had that age at the time and was also a footballer. Alongside seven other players, he left the club on 10 November.

== Personal life ==
Ronny's older brother, Raffael, was also a footballer. An attacking midfielder, he represented most notably Borussia Mönchengladbach and Hertha, where the pair played together for two seasons.

== Honours ==
=== Club ===
Sporting

- Taça de Portugal: 2006–07, 2007–08
- Supertaça Cândido de Oliveira: 2007, 2008

=== International ===
Brazil Under-17

- FIFA U-17 World Cup: 2003
