= Sascha Burchert =

German professional footballer

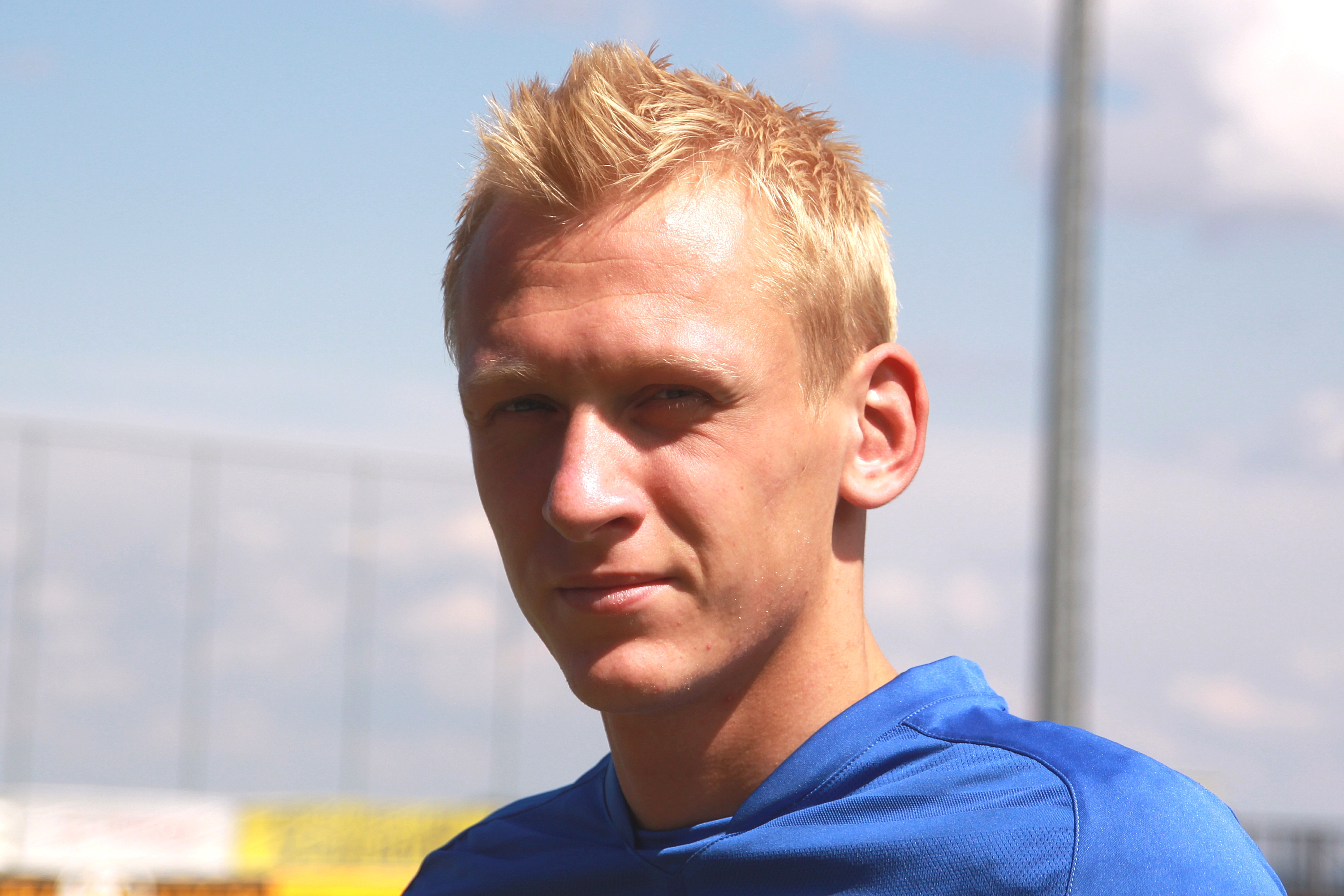
- Burchert with Hertha BSC in 2009

Personal information
- Date of birth: 30 October 1989 (age 36)
- Place of birth: East Berlin-Buch, East Germany
- Height: 1.88 m (6 ft 2 in)
- Position: Goalkeeper

Youth career
- –2002: Wartenberger SV
- 2002–2007: Hertha BSC

Senior career*
Years	Team	Apps	(Gls)
2007–2016	Hertha BSC II	67	(0)
2009–2016	Hertha BSC	14	(0)
2015	→ Vålerenga (loan)	14	(0)
2016–2022	Greuther Fürth	138	(0)
2022–2025	FC St. Pauli	0	(0)

International career
2007–2009	Germany U21	2	(0)
- * Club domestic league appearances and goals

Sascha Burchert (born 30 October 1989) is a German former professional footballer who played as a goalkeeper.

== Club career ==
Burchert began his career with Wartenberger SV. In summer 2002, he was scouted by Hertha BSC. He signed his first professional contract on 30 January 2008. Burchert made his Hertha debut on 17 September 2009 in a Europa League match against Latvian side, FK Ventspils, and came on in the twenty-first minute, replacing starting goalkeeper Jaroslav Drobný.

Burchert played his first Bundesliga game on 20 September 2009 against Hamburger SV. In his second game, he conceded two strange goals. Having replaced the injured Timo Ochs with the score at 1–1, Burchert was caught off his line, having headed a clearance from a through ball. Hamburg's David Jarolím volleyed the ball into an empty net from long range. Two minutes later, the same thing happened. Zé Roberto scored from the edge of the centre circle, and Burchert was off his line after another headed clearance.

In the 2013–14 season Burchert was pushed further down the pecking order for Hertha, as the side has preferred Thomas Kraft and Marius Gersbeck over him.

On 25 April 2015, Burchert started his first match in the Bundesliga in five years in a 1–0 loss against Bayern Munich. He conceded an 80th-minute goal to Bastian Schweinsteiger. Hertha BSC had been on a seven match undefeated streak.

On 20 June 2016, Burchert signed with Greuther Fürth.

On 8 August 2022, Burchert moved to FC St. Pauli.

== Personal life ==
Sascha is the brother of fellow goalkeeper Nico Burchert, playing for Paderborn.

== Career statistics ==
As of match played 30 January 2024

Appearances and goals by club, season and competition
Club	Season	League			DFB-Pokal		Europe		Other		Total	
Club	Season	League	Apps	Goals	Apps	Goals	Apps	Goals	Apps	Goals	Apps	Goals
Hertha BSC II	2008–09	Regionalliga Nord	8	0	—		—		—		8	0
Hertha BSC II	2009–10	Regionalliga Nord	13	0	—		—		—		13	0
Hertha BSC II	2010–11	Regionalliga Nord	18	0	—		—		—		18	0
Hertha BSC II	2011–12	Regionalliga Nord	14	0	—		—		—		14	0
Hertha BSC II	2012–13	Regionalliga Nordost	2	0	—		—		—		2	0
Hertha BSC II	2013–14	Regionalliga Nordost	9	0	—		—		—		9	0
Hertha BSC II	2014–15	Regionalliga Nordost	1	0	—		—		—		1	0
Hertha BSC II	2015–16	Regionalliga Nordost	2	0	—		—		—		2	0
Hertha BSC II	Total		67	0	—		—		—		67	0
Hertha BSC	2009–10	Bundesliga	3	0	1	0	3 (Note: Appearance(s) in UEFA Europa League)	0	—		7	0
Hertha BSC	2010–11	2. Bundesliga	3	0	0	0	—		—		3	0
Hertha BSC	2011–12	Bundesliga	2	0	2	0	—		—		4	0
Hertha BSC	2012–13	2. Bundesliga	5	0	0	0	—		—		5	0
Hertha BSC	2014–15	Bundesliga	2	0	0	0	—		—		2	0
Hertha BSC	Total		15	0	3	0	3	0	—		21	0
Vålerenga (loan)	2015	Tippeligaen	14	0	0	0	—		—		14	0
Greuther Fürth	2016–17	2. Bundesliga	2	0	3	0	—		—		5	0
Greuther Fürth	2017–18	2. Bundesliga	24	0	1	0	—		—		25	0
Greuther Fürth	2018–19	2. Bundesliga	33	0	1	0	—		—		34	0
Greuther Fürth	2019–20	2. Bundesliga	32	0	0	0	—		—		32	0
Greuther Fürth	2020–21	2. Bundesliga	33	0	3	0	—		—		36	0
Greuther Fürth	2021–22	Bundesliga	14	0	0	0	—		—		14	0
Greuther Fürth	Total		138	0	8	0	—		—		146	0
Greuther Fürth II	2016–17	Regionalliga Bayern	6	0	—		—		4	0	10	0
Greuther Fürth II	2017–18	Regionalliga Bayern	2	0	—		—		—		2	0
Greuther Fürth II	Total		8	0	—		—		4	0	12	0
FC St. Pauli	2022–23	2. Bundesliga	0	0	0	0	—		—		0	0
FC St. Pauli	2023–24	2. Bundesliga	0	0	4	0	—		—		4	0
FC St. Pauli	Total		0	0	4	0	—		—		4	0
Career total			242	0	15	0	3	0	4	0	264	0

== Honours ==
FC St. Pauli

- 2.Bundesliga : 2023–24
