= 2015–16 1. FC Magdeburg season =

1. FC Magdeburg
2015–16 season
- President: Peter Fechner
- Manager: Jens Härtel
- Stadium: MDCC-Arena
- 3. Liga: 4th
- Saxony-Anhalt Cup: Runner-up
- Top goalscorer: League: Christian Beck (19 goals); All: Christian Beck (22 goals)
- Highest home attendance: 23,043 vs. 1. FSV Mainz 05 II, 19 December 2015
- Lowest home attendance: 13,449 vs. VfB Stuttgart II, 28 November 2015
- Average home league attendance: 18,394
Home colours	Away colours	Third colours
- All statistics correct as of 12 March 2016.

The 2015–16 1. FC Magdeburg season is their first season in the 3. Liga.

== Events ==
In June 2015, the club announced their pre-season plan. Later they confirmed that the friendly match against Berliner AK 07 would be played on a training pitch at MDCC-Arena, while they would face FC Viktoria Köln at the Sparkassen-Arena in nearby Bernburg. Magdeburg took part in the Kaiserstuhl-Cup where the side faced hosts Bahlinger SC and French 2014–15 Ligue 2 winners ES Troyes AC, eventually winning the cup. They would also play a match against FSV Havelberg, a club from north-eastern Saxony-Anhalt, who won the right to host in a poll held by regional newspaper Volksstimme.

== Transfers ==
=== In ===
No.	Pos.	Name	Age	EU	Moving from	Type	Transfer Window	Contract ends	Transfer fee	Ref.
2	DF	(Czech Republic) Lukáš Nový	24	Yes	BFC Dynamo	Transfer	Summer	2017	Free	
6	MF	(Germany) Jan Löhmannsröben	24	Yes	Wacker Nordhausen	Transfer	Summer	2017	Free	
9	FW	(Germany) Manuel Farrona-Pulido	22	Yes	Wacker Nordhausen	Transfer	Summer	2017	Free	
10	DF	(Germany) Nico Hammann	27	Yes	SV Sandhausen	Transfer	Winter	2017	Free	
13	DF	(United States) Ryan Malone	24	No	Springfield College	Transfer	Summer	2016	Free	
19	MF	(Germany) Michel Niemeyer	20	Yes	RB Leipzig II	Transfer	Summer	2017	Free	
20	MF	(Germany) Ahmed Waseem Razeek	20	Yes	1. FC Union Berlin II	Transfer	Summer	2017	Free	
21	MF	(Germany) David Kinsombi	19	Yes	Karlsruher SC	Loan	Winter	2016	—	
22	DF	(Canada) André Hainault	29	No	VfR Aalen	Transfer	Summer	2016	Free	
24	MF	(Germany) Tarek Chahed	19	Yes	1. FC Magdeburg Youth	Transfer	Summer	2017	—	
25	MF	(Germany) Sebastian Ernst	20	Yes	Hannover 96 II	Transfer	Winter	2017	Undisclosed	
27	DF	(Germany) Burak Altiparmak	24	Yes	Osmanlıspor	Transfer	Summer	2016	Free	

=== Out ===
No.	Pos.	Name	Age	EU	Moving to	Type	Transfer Window	Transfer fee	Ref.
2	DF	(Germany) Nico Hammann	27	Yes	SV Sandhausen	Transfer	Summer	Free	
9	FW	(Germany) Matthias Steinborn	26	Yes	SV Babelsberg 03	Transfer	Summer	Free	
10	MF	(Germany) Marcel Schlosser	27	Yes	VfB Auerbach	Transfer	Summer	Free	
13	MF	(Germany) Christoph Siefkes	24	Yes	FC Rapperswil-Jona	Transfer	Summer	Free	
20	DF	(Germany) René Lange	26	Yes	FSV Zwickau	Transfer	Summer	Free	
21	MF	(Germany) Sven Reimann	21	Yes	FC Carl Zeiss Jena	Released	Winter	Free	
22	MF	(Germany) Morris Schröter	19	Yes	FSV Zwickau	Transfer	Summer	Free	
26	MF	(Germany) Sven Torge Bremer	20	Yes	Germania Halberstadt	Loan	Summer	Free	

== Preseason and friendlies ==
Win Draw Loss Postponed

Date	Kickoff^{A}	Venue	City	Opponent	Res.^{B}	Att.	Goalscorers		Ref.
Date	Kickoff^{A}	Venue	City	Opponent	Res.^{B}	Att.	1. FC Magdeburg	Opponent	Ref.
24 June 2015	18:00	Sportplatz Hohenwarthe	Hohenwarthe	Eintracht Hohenwarthe	26–0	1,300	Sowislo 12', 21', 42'; Farrona-Pulido 15', 23'; Beck 28'; Reimann 31', 38'; Kruschke 33'; Löhmannsröben 45'; Hebisch 49', 58', 59', 74', 77', 80'; Nový 52'; Fuchs 55', 90'; Chahed 64'; Bankert 67', 70'; Schlosser 72', 82'; Bremer 73'; Handke 86'		
27 June 2015	14:00		Straguth	Anhalt-Auswahl	11–0	513	Butzen 36'; Kruschke 39', 42'; Fuchs 63', 65'; Beck 67', 69'; Farrona-Pulido 72', 76', 90'; Sowislo 78'		
1 July 2015	14:00	MDCC-Arena Platz 2	Magdeburg	Berliner AK 07	2–3	430	Schiller 47'; Kruschke 56'	Kahlert 22', 27'; Gutsche 43'	
4 July 2015	14:00	Parkstadion	Burg	Burger BC 08	6–1	1,400	Fuchs 21'; Malone 58'; Kruschke 60', 63'; Sowislo 78'; Razeek 89'	Glage 8'	
8 July 2015	18:00	Sparkassen-Arena	Bernburg	FC Viktoria Köln	1–2	723	Schlosser 76'	van Santen 71', 89'	
10 July 2015	17:10	Kaiserstuhlstadion	Bahlingen	Bahlinger SC	1–3	1,254	Hebisch 55'	Sautner 14'; Adam 24'; Göppert 69'	
11 July 2015	15:00	Kaiserstuhlstadion	Bahlingen	ES Troyes AC	5–1	1,400	Sowislo 29'; Handke 32'; Beck 35', 57' (pen.); Fuchs 62'	Bekamenga 86' (pen.)	
15 July 2015	18:00	Sportplatz Mühlenholz	Havelberg	FSV Havelberg	14–1	1,423	Hebisch 2', 28', 35', 43'; Reimann 7', 29', 42'; Fuchs 23', 25'; Beck 51', 57', 83'; Kruschke 53'; Bankert 55'	Leppin 44'	
18 July 2015	15:00	Sportforum Hohenschönhausen	Berlin	Berliner FC Dynamo	3–1	700	Farrona-Pulido 22'; Beck 33', 55'	Muhović 51'	
4 August 2015	18:00	Sportplatz Zielitzer Straße	Magdeburg	TuS 1860 Magdeburg-Neustadt	13–0	1,053	Kruschke 4', 52', 67'; Nový 19'; Schlosser 34', 40', 53', 57', 61'; Farrona-Pulido 59'; Hebisch 74', 86'; Puttkammer 78'		
12 August 2015	14:00	AOK-Stadion	Wolfsburg	VfL Wolfsburg	4–3	2,205	Beck 13'; Brandt 67'; Chahed 69'; Bankert 82'	Caligiuri 9'; Bendtner 20'; Hunt 44'	
2 September 2015	18:00	MDCC-Arena Platz 2	Magdeburg	Viktoria Berlin	1–2	350	Hebisch 17'	Beyazit 37', 44'	
3 September 2015	16:30	B-Platz an der Hamburger Straße	Braunschweig	Eintracht Braunschweig II	0–1			Dacaj 78'	
12 October 2015	18:30	MDCC-Arena	Magdeburg	Borussia Dortmund	2–2	19,679	Hebisch 31'; Beck 72'	Maruoka 32'; Januzaj 33'	
7 January 2016	16:30		Novo Sancti Petri	Chiclana CF	8–1		Fuchs 4'; Sowislo 5' (pen.); Hebisch 18', 38', 41'; Beck 46', 82'; Razeek 84'	56'	
16 January 2016	13:00	MDCC-Arena	Magdeburg	SV Babelsberg 03	3–1		Farrona-Pulido 65'; Altiparmak 74' (pen.); Kruschke 86'	Steinborn 21'	
6 February 2016	11:00	MDCC-Arena Platz 2	Magdeburg	Hannover 96 II	2–0	300	Razeek 81'; Farrona-Pulido 86'		
12 April 2016		HOWOGE-Arena "Hans Zoschke"	Berlin	SV Lichtenberg 47	1–0	456	Kruschke 42'		

== 3. Liga ==
On 2 July 2015, the German football association DFB published the preliminary schedule for the new 3. Liga season. 1. FC Magdeburg were awarded the opening game of the season to be held on Friday, 24 July, at 8.30 pm. The match will be broadcast live on television channel MDR.

=== 3. Liga fixtures & results ===
Win Draw Loss Postponed

MD	Date Kickoff^{A}	H/A	Opponent	Res.^{B} F–A	Att.	Goalscorers		Table		Ref.
MD	Date Kickoff^{A}	H/A	Opponent	Res.^{B} F–A	Att.	1. FC Magdeburg	Opponent	Pos.	Pts.	Ref.
1	24 July 2015; 20:30	H	FC Rot-Weiß Erfurt	2–1	21,079	Beck 60'; Fuchs 89'	Erb 31'	3rd	3	
2	31 July 2015; 19:00	A	1. FSV Mainz 05 II	2–2	2,870	Hebisch 6'; Fuchs 21'	Parker 57'; Derstroff 64'	6th	4	
3	16 August 2015; 14:00	H	Hallescher FC	2–1	20,912	Beck 34', 78'	Osawe 1'	2nd	7	
4	21 August 2015; 19:00	A	SV Werder Bremen II	1–1	2,600	Sowislo 65' (pen.)	Aycicek 90'	3rd	8	
5	25 August 2015; 20:30	H	Chemnitzer FC	2–0	19,112	Beck 20'; Brandt 77'		2nd	11	
6	28 August 2015; 19:00	A	SC Fortuna Köln	1–2	3,323	Beck 20'	Rahn 27' (Pen.), 29' (Pen.)	3rd	11	
8^{C}	11 September 2015; 19:00	A	Stuttgarter Kickers	0–1	6,270		Braun 36'	5th	11	
7^{C}	15 September 2015; 18:30	H	VfL Osnabrück	3–0	15,324	Sowislo 49'; Beck 61', 72'		5th	14	
9	18 September 2015; 19:00	H	VfR Aalen	1–2	16,093	Sowislo 21'	Müller 6'; Morys 88'	8th	14	
10	23 September 2015; 20:30	A	F.C. Hansa Rostock	1–1	16,300	Altiparmak 68'	Butzen 48' (o.g.)	8th	15	
11	26 September 2015; 14:00	H	FC Energie Cottbus	2–2	19,453	Beck 55', 90+1' (pen.)	Sukuta-Pasu 59'; Mattuschka 66'	7th	16	
12	2 October 2015; 19:00	A	Holstein Kiel	0–0	6,515			7th	17	
13	18 October 2015; 14:00	A	FC Erzgebirge Aue	0–0	10,050			7th	18	
14	24 October 2015; 14:00	H	SV Wehen Wiesbaden	1–0	14,981	Malone 83'		4th	21	
15	31 October 2015; 14:00	A	SG Dynamo Dresden	2–3	29,321	Farrona-Pulido 35'; Malone 89'	Eilers 21' (pen.) 81'; Testroet 73'	6th	21	
16	7 November 2015; 14:00	H	SC Preußen Münster	3–0	16,616	Beck 10'; Fuchs 45+1'; Sowislo 81'		5th	24	
17	21 November 2015; 14:00	A	SG Sonnenhof Großaspach	0–1	2,300		Rizzi 82' (pen.)	7th	24	
18	28 November 2015; 14:00	H	VfB Stuttgart II	2–2	13,449	Razeek 28', 38'	Vier 85'; Gabriele 90'	7th	25	
19	5 December 2015; 14:00	A	Würzburger Kickers	1–1	5,617	Beck 42'	Fennell 88'	7th	26	
20	14 December 2015; 18:30	A	FC Rot-Weiß Erfurt	2–0	7,069	Brandt 8'; Beck 14'		6th	29	
21	19 December 2015; 14:00	H	1. FSV Mainz 05 II	3–1	23,043	Beck 12', 37', 68'	Derstroff 39'	4th	32	
22	24 January 2016; 14:00	A	Hallescher FC	2–1	12,500	Ernst 5', 68'	Lindenhahn 32'	4th	35	
23	30 January 2016; 14:00	H	SV Werder Bremen II	1–1	15,873	Chahed 47'	Kazior 88'	4th	36	
24	5 February 2016; 20:30	A	Chemnitzer FC	0–0	8,278			4th	37	
25	13 February 2016; 14:00	H	SC Fortuna Köln	0–0	14,962			5th	38	
26	20 February 2016; 14:00	A	VfL Osnabrück	0–2	10,282		Savran 34', 70'	5th	38	
27	28 February 2016; 14:00	H	Stuttgarter Kickers	2–1	15,412	Ernst 2'; Chahed 32'	Abruscia 66'	5th	41	
28	2 March 2016; 18:30	A	VfR Aalen	0–0	4,555			5th	42	
29	5 March 2016; 14:00	H	F.C. Hansa Rostock	4–1	20,361	Sowislo 25' 90+1' (pen.); Farrona-Pulido 39'; Beck 77'	Kofler 43'	4th	45	
30	12 March 2016; 14:00	A	FC Energie Cottbus	0–2	8,404		Michel 8'; Kauko 45'	5th	45	
31	20 March 2016; 14:00	H	Holstein Kiel	0–1	16,446		Janzer 28'	6th	45	
32	1 April 2016; 20:30	H	FC Erzgebirge Aue	0–3	21,812		Köpke 18', 38'; Skarlatidis 44'	6th	45	
33	8 April 2016; 19:00	A	SV Wehen Wiesbaden	0–0	3,002			6th	46	
34	16 April 2016; 14:00	H	SG Dynamo Dresden	2–2	21,954	Niemeyer 41'; Farrona-Pulido 60'	Testroet 63'; Eilers 67'	6th	47	
35	22 April 2016; 19:00	A	SC Preußen Münster	2–1	8,140	Beck 16', 89'	Schweers 45'	6th	50	
36	30 April 2016; 14:00	H	SG Sonnenhof Großaspach	4–0	20,532	Niemeyer 27'; Beck 35'; Farrona-Pulido 51'; Löhmannsröben 85'		5th	53	
37	7 May 2016; 13:30	A	VfB Stuttgart II	1–0	1,410	Sowislo 46'		4th	56	
38	14 May 2016; 13:30	H	Würzburger Kickers	0–1	22,072		Soriano 14'	4th	56	

=== League table ===
Pos	Team	Pld	W	D	L	GF	GA	GD	Pts	Promotion, qualification or relegation
2	Erzgebirge Aue (P)	38	19	13	6	42	21	+21	70	Promotion to 2. Bundesliga and qualification for DFB-Pokal
3	Würzburger Kickers (O, P)	38	16	16	6	43	25	+18	64	Qualification for promotion play-offs and DFB-Pokal
4	1. FC Magdeburg	38	14	14	10	49	37	+12	56	Qualification for DFB-Pokal
5	VfL Osnabrück	38	14	14	10	46	41	+5	56	
6	Chemnitzer FC	38	15	10	13	52	46	+6	55	

Source: DFB
Rules for classification: 1) Points; 2) Goal difference; 3) Goals scored
(O) Play-off winners; (P) Promoted

== Saxony-Anhalt Cup ==
=== Saxony-Anhalt Cup review ===
In the Saxony-Anhalt Cup, Magdeburg was drawn to face Kreveser SV in the first round. This is a repeat of last season's second-round pairing which ended with a clear 9-1 victory for then-Regionalliga side.

=== Saxony-Anhalt Cup results ===
Win Draw Loss Postponed

RD	Date	Kickoff^{A}	Venue	City	Opponent	Result^{B}	Attendance	Goalscorers		Ref.
RD	Date	Kickoff^{A}	Venue	City	Opponent	Result^{B}	Attendance	1. FC Magdeburg	Opponent	Ref.
1	9 August 2015	14:00	Sportschule Osterburg	Osterburg	Kreveser SV	4–1	1,400	Kruschke 13' (pen.); Brandt 18'; Malone 32'; Farrona-Pulido 76'	Weihrauch 47' (pen.)	
2	10 October 2015	14:00	Guts Muths Stadion	Magdeburg	MSV Börde	3–0	1,500	Handke 15'; Razeek 57'; Sowislo 86'		
3	14 November 2015	14:00	Stadion Volkspark	Wittenberg	FC Grün-Weiß Piesteritz	8–0	1,051	Kruschke 10'; Beck 30', 48'; Hebisch 71', 74', 82'; Sowislo 87'; Reimann 88'		
QF	26 March 2016	14:00	Stadion am Zoo	Halle (Saale)	VfL Halle 96	4–0	1,200	Bankert 24'; Kruschke 28'; Altiparmak 86'; Beck 91'		
SF	27 April 2016	18:00	Heinrich Germer Stadium	Magdeburg	FSV Barleben	5–1	3,347	Hammann 6', 43'; Farrona-Pulido 40'; Ernst 45'; Altiparmak 53'	Piele 90'	
F	18 May 2016	20:30	Erdgas Sportpark	Halle	Hallescher FC	1–2	13,297	Malone 88'	Osawe 27'; Lindenhahn 77'	

== Player information ==
As of 19 May 2016

No.	Pos	Nat	Player	Total		3. Liga		Saxony-Anhalt Cup	
No.	Pos	Nat	Player	Apps	Goals	Apps	Goals	Apps	Goals
1	GK	(Germany) GER	Matthias Tischer	6	0	2	0	4	0
2	DF	(Czech Republic) CZE	Lukáš Nový	0	0	0	0	0	0
3	DF	(Germany) GER	Christopher Handke	33	1	30	0	3	1
4	DF	(Germany) GER	Silvio Bankert	15	1	12	0	3	1
5	DF	(Germany) GER	Felix Schiller	7	0	7	0	0	0
6	MF	(Germany) GER	Jan Löhmannsröben	35	1	32	1	3	0
7	FW	(Germany) GER	Lars Fuchs	20	3	19	3	1	0
8	DF	(Germany) GER	Steffen Puttkammer	29	0	26	0	3	0
9	FW	(Germany) GER	Manuel Farrona-Pulido	33	6	30	4	3	2
10	DF	(Germany) GER	Nico Hammann	15	2	13	0	2	2
11	FW	(Germany) GER	Christian Beck	43	22	38	19	5	3
12	GK	(Germany) GER	Jan Glinker	37	0	36	0	1	0
13	DF	(United States) USA	Ryan Malone	12	4	9	2	3	2
14	MF	(Germany) GER	Niklas Brandt	38	3	33	2	5	1
15	MF	(Germany) GER	Kevin Kruschke	15	3	10	0	5	3
16	DF	(Germany) GER	Nils Butzen	37	0	32	0	5	0
17	MF	(Poland) POL	Marius Sowislo	41	9	35	7	6	2
18	FW	(Germany) GER	Nicolas Hebisch	26	4	21	1	5	3
19	MF	(Germany) GER	Michel Niemeyer	20	2	18	2	2	0
20	MF	(Germany) GER	Ahmed Waseem Razeek	29	3	23	2	6	1
21	DF	(Germany) GER	David Kinsombi	12	0	11	0	1	0
22	MF	(Canada) CAN	André Hainault	20	0	18	0	2	0
24	MF	(Germany) GER	Tarek Chahed	36	2	32	2	4	0
25	MF	(Germany) GER	Sebastian Ernst	18	4	15	3	3	1
27	DF	(Germany) GER	Burak Altiparmak	28	3	24	1	4	2
30	GK	(Germany) GER	Lukas Cichos	1	0	0	0	1	0
Players who left the club during the 2015–16 season
10	MF	(Germany) GER	Marcel Schlosser	1	0	1	0	0	0
21	MF	(Germany) GER	Sven Reimann	7	1	4	0	3	1
26	MF	(Germany) GER	Sven Torge Bremer	1	0	0	0	1	0

== Notes ==
A. Kickoff time in Central European Time/Central European Summer Time.
B. 1. FC Magdeburg goals first.
C. The match against Osnabrück on matchday 7 had to be postponed due to call-ups to national teams.
