= 2016–17 1. FC Magdeburg season =

German football club's season

1. FC Magdeburg
2016–17 season
- President: Peter Fechner
- Manager: Jens Härtel
- Stadium: MDCC-Arena
- 2016–17 3. Liga: 4th
- DFB-Pokal: 1st round
- Saxony-Anhalt Cup: Winners
- Top goalscorer: League: Christian Beck (19); All: Beck (24)
- Highest home attendance: 23,478 vs Lotte
- Lowest home attendance: 12,238 vs Bremen II
- Average home league attendance: 17,100
- Biggest win: 3–0 vs 4 opponents
- Biggest defeat: 0–3 vs Köln
Home colours	Away colours

The 2016–17 1. FC Magdeburg season was their second season in the 3. Liga. As in the previous season, the side finished fourth overall, qualifying for the 2017–18 DFB-Pokal. In addition, Magdeburg won the Saxony-Anhalt Cup, increasing their record to 11 wins in that competition. Their run in the 2016–17 DFB-Pokal was cut short, when the team lost to eventual finalists Eintracht Frankfurt on penalties in the first round.

== Transfers ==
=== In ===
No.	Pos.	Name	Age	EU	Moving from	Type	Transfer Window	Contract ends	Transfer fee	Ref.
1	GK	(Germany) Leopold Zingerle	22	Yes	SpVgg Greuther Fürth	Transfer	Summer	2017	Free	
4	DF	(Germany) Moritz Sprenger	21	Yes	VfL Wolfsburg	Loan	Summer	2017	-	
7	FW	(Germany) Maurice Exslager	25	Yes	1. FC Köln	Transfer	Summer	2018	Free	
15	MF	(Germany) Tobias Schwede	22	Yes	SV Werder Bremen II	Transfer	Summer	2017		
18	MF	(Germany) Florian Kath	21	Yes	SC Freiburg	Loan	Summer	2017		
21	FW	(Germany) Julius Düker	20	Yes	Eintracht Braunschweig	Transfer	Summer	2018		
26	MF	(Germany) Gerrit Müller	32	Yes	Stuttgarter Kickers	Transfer	Summer	2018		

=== Out ===
No.	Pos.	Name	Age	EU	Moving to	Type	Transfer Window	Transfer fee	Ref.
1	GK	(Germany) Matthias Tischer	30	Yes	—	Retirement	Summer	—	
4	DF	(Germany) Silvio Bankert	31	Yes	—	Retirement	Summer	—	
7	FW	(Germany) Lars Fuchs	34	Yes	—	Retirement	Summer	—	
13	DF	(United States) Ryan Malone	25	No	Stuttgarter Kickers	Released	Summer	—	
15	MF	(Germany) Kevin Kruschke	24	Yes	SV Rödinghausen	Released	Summer	—	
18	FW	(Germany) Nicolas Hebisch	26	Yes	SV Waldhof Mannheim	Released	Summer	—	
21	MF	(Germany) David Kinsombi	20	Yes	Karlsruher SC	End of loan	Summer	—	
27	DF	(Germany) Burak Altiparmak	25	Yes	Denizlispor	Released	Summer	—	

== Preseason and friendlies ==
Win Draw Loss Postponed

Date	Kickoff^{A}	Venue	City	Opponent	Res.^{B}	Att.	Goalscorers		Ref.
Date	Kickoff^{A}	Venue	City	Opponent	Res.^{B}	Att.	1. FC Magdeburg	Opponent	Ref.
29 June 2016	18:00	Stadion am Schöppensteg	Magdeburg	SV Fortuna Magdeburg	11–0	1,133	Razeek 5', 23'; Düker 8', 34'; Müller 8', 10'; Beck 68', 79', 85'; Sowislo 71' (pen.); Farrona-Pulido 83'		
2 July 2016	14:00	Sportplatz Heyrothsberge	Heyrothsberge	SV Union Heyrothsberge	9–2		Nový 3'; Schwede 19'; Düker 33', 58'; Exslager 50' (pen.), 90'; Hammann 59'; Razeek 67'; Chahed 83'	Groth 4'; Stridde 63'	
2 July 2016	16:30	Sportplatz Heyrothsberge	Heyrothsberge	FSV Optik Rathenow	4–0		Beck 34', 83'; Müller 60'; Farrona-Pulido 64'		
6 July 2016	18:00	Waldstadion Haldensleben	Haldensleben	Odense Boldklub	1–1	1,714	Beck 19' (pen.)	Thomas Mikkelsen 81'	
9 July 2016	14:00	MDCC-Arena, Platz 2	Magdeburg	Hertha BSC II	3–0	1,000	Sprenger 3'; Hammann 14' (pen.); Exslager 77'		
13 July 2016	18:00		Langlingen	Hamburger SV II	1–2		Beck 8'	Daouri 2'; Küc 73'	
16 July 2016	15:00		Langlingen	USI Lupo-Martini Wolfsburg	2–0		Beck 3'; Chahed 5'		
19 July 2016	18:30		Osterwieck	Eintracht Osterwieck	19–0	2,010	Exslager 3', 88', 90'; Beck 10', 12', 14', 68', 74', 85', 86'; Hammann 20'; Handke 27'; Butzen 32'; Razeek 38', 39'; Brandt 65'; Chahed 73', 79'; Hauch 76' (o.g.)		
23 July 2016	14:30	MDCC-Arena	Magdeburg	Wacker Nordhausen	3–1	0	Exslager 53', 76'; Chahed 55'	Pfingsten-Reddig 18'	

== 3. Liga ==
=== 3. Liga fixtures & results ===
Win Draw Loss Postponed

MD	Date Kickoff^{A}	H/A	Opponent	Res.^{B} F–A	Att.	Goalscorers		Table		Ref.
MD	Date Kickoff^{A}	H/A	Opponent	Res.^{B} F–A	Att.	1. FC Magdeburg	Opponent	Pos.	Pts.	Ref.
1	31 July 2016; 14:00	H	SC Fortuna Köln	0–3	17,796		Dahmani 31'; Uaferro 47'; Souza 64'	20th	0	
3^{C}	9 August 2016; 19:00	H	SC Paderborn	3–0	15,896	Beck 26', 33', 87' (pen.)		14th	3	
4	13 August 2016; 14:00	A	VfL Osnabrück	2–3	8,722	Farrona-Pulido 77' (pen.); Razeek 81'	Reimerink 58'; Groß 63'; Hohnstedt 86'	15th	3	
5	26 August 2016; 18:30	H	MSV Duisburg	1–2	15,718	Beck 12'	Bajic 20'; Erat 40'	18th	3	
2^{C}	1 September 2016; 19:00	A	FSV Zwickau	0–0	7,844			17th	4	
6	10 September 2016; 14:00	A	1. FSV Mainz 05 II	0–1	1,498		Seydel 45'	18th	4	
7	17 September 2016; 14:00	A	SC Preußen Münster	3–2	6,283	Beck 6' (pen.); Schiller 24'; Handke 66'	Weißenfels 27'; Grimaldi 47'	15th	7	
8	21 September 2016; 18:30	H	SV Werder Bremen II	2–0	12,238	Sowislo 14'; Chahed 90+2'		12th	10	
9	25 September 2016; 14:00	A	SV Wehen Wiesbaden	3–0	2,956	Ruprecht 36' (o.g.); Beck 58'; Farrona-Pulido 64'		10th	13	
10	1 October 2016; 14:00	H	Holstein Kiel	1–0	15,124	Beck 85'		9th	16	
11	15 October 2016; 14:00	A	FC Rot-Weiß Erfurt	0–1	8,985		Bieber 83'	12th	16	
12	22 October 2016	H	Chemnitzer FC	2–4	17,700	Beck 78'; Sowislo 88'	Fink 12', 25'; Grote 63'; Frahn 81'	13th	16	
13	29 October 2016; 14:00	A	SSV Jahn Regensburg	1–1	6,386	Löhmannsröben 71'	Pusch 50'	14th	17	
14	5 November 2016; 14:00	H	F.C. Hansa Rostock	1–1	21,001	Beck 43'	Gebhart 90+3'	13th	18	
15	19 November 2016; 14:00	A	SG Sonnenhof Großaspach	3–1	2,400	Puttkammer 5'; Sowislo 20'; Löhmannsröben 90+1'	Osei Kwadwo 39'	11th	21	
16	26 November 2016; 14:00	H	Hallescher FC	1–0	19,235	Sowislo 9' (pen.)		8th	24	
17	3 December 2016; 14:00	A	FSV Frankfurt	1–0	4,028	Düker 19'		5th	27	
18	10 December 2016; 14:00	H	VfR Aalen	3–0	12,622	Müller 7' (o.g.); Schwede 40'; Ernst 59'		3rd	30	
19	17 December 2016; 14:00	A	Sportfreunde Lotte	3–1	3,468	Beck 47'; Düker 49'; Chahed 90+1'	Nauber 81'	2nd	33	
20	28 January 2017; 14:00	A	SC Fortuna Köln	1–2	3,076	Schiller 26'	Zingerle 23' (o.g.); Mimbala 66'	3rd	33	
21	5 February 2017; 14:10	H	FSV Zwickau	1–1	15,053	Hammann 45+1' (pen.)	Bär 31'	3rd	34	
22	11 February 2017; 14:00	A	SC Paderborn	1–1	6,221	Chahed 17'	Beck 21' (o.g.)	3rd	35	
23	18 February 2017; 14:00	H	VfL Osnabrück	3–0	16,014	Kath 13'; Beck 54'; Sowislo 83'		2nd	38	
24	24 February 2017; 18:30	A	MSV Duisburg	0–0	18,164			2nd	39	
25	4 March 2017; 14:00	H	1. FSV Mainz 05 II	1–2	15,456	Schwede 35'	Seydel 8'; Zimling 53'	2nd	39	
26	10 March 2017; 18:30	H	SC Preußen Münster	1–0	17,741	Weil 67' (pen.)		2nd	42	
27	14 March 2017; 18:00	A	SV Werder Bremen II	1–0	2,836	Weil 90+3' (pen.)		2nd	45	
28	19 March 2017; 14:00	H	SV Wehen Wiesbaden	0–0	15,338			2nd	46	
29	25 March 2017; 14:00	A	Holstein Kiel	1–1	8,420	Kath 49'	Czichos 85'	2nd	47	
30	1 April 2017	H	FC Rot-Weiß Erfurt	2–0	20,506	Farrona Pulido 46'; Beck 74'		2nd	50	
31	4 April 2017; 20:30	A	Chemnitzer FC	1–1	8,392	Sowislo 69'	Dabanli 88'	2nd	51	
32	9 April 2017; 14:00	H	SSV Jahn Regensburg	1–2	19,627	Puttkammer 62'	Saller 64'; Thommy 71'	3rd	51	
33	15 April 2017; 14:00	A	F.C. Hansa Rostock	1–1	20,400	Beck 67'	Andrist 77' (pen.)	5th	52	
34	22 April 2017; 14:00	H	SG Sonnenhof Großaspach	2–1	18,550	Beck 6', 68'	Schiek 34'	3rd	55	
35	29 April 2017; 14:00	A	Hallescher FC	1–1	8,021	Ćwielong 46'	Röser 15'	4th	56	
36	6 May 2017; 14:00	H	FSV Frankfurt	1–1	17,129	Beck 59'	Graudenz 63'	3rd	57	
37	13 May 2017; 13:30	A	VfR Aalen	2–2	6,728	Beck 9'; Razeek 78'	Morys 29'; Kienle 72'	4th	58	
38	20 May 2017; 13:30	H	Sportfreunde Lotte	2–0	23,478	Niemeyer 64'; Kath 68'		4th	61	

=== League table ===
Pos	Team	Pld	W	D	L	GF	GA	GD	Pts	Promotion, qualification or relegation
2	Holstein Kiel (P)	38	18	13	7	59	25	+34	67	Promotion to 2. Bundesliga and qualification for DFB-Pokal
3	Jahn Regensburg (O, P)	38	18	9	11	62	50	+12	63	Qualification for promotion play-offs and DFB-Pokal
4	1. FC Magdeburg	38	16	13	9	53	36	+17	61	Qualification for DFB-Pokal
5	FSV Zwickau	38	16	8	14	47	54	−7	56	
6	VfL Osnabrück	38	15	9	14	46	43	+3	54	

Source: DFB
Rules for classification: 1) Points; 2) Goal difference; 3) Goals scored
(O) Play-off winners; (P) Promoted

== DFB-Pokal ==
Win Draw Loss Postponed

RD	Date	Kickoff^{A}	Venue	City	Opponent	Result^{B}	Attendance	Goalscorers		Ref.
RD	Date	Kickoff^{A}	Venue	City	Opponent	Result^{B}	Attendance	1. FC Magdeburg	Opponent	Ref.
1	21 August 2016	15:30	MDCC-Arena	Magdeburg	Eintracht Frankfurt	24,605	1–1 (3–4 pen.)	Hammann 87'	Hrgota 7'	

== Saxony-Anhalt Cup ==
=== Saxony-Anhalt Cup results ===
Win Draw Loss Postponed

RD	Date	Kickoff^{A}	Venue	City	Opponent	Result^{B}	Attendance	Goalscorers		Ref.
RD	Date	Kickoff^{A}	Venue	City	Opponent	Result^{B}	Attendance	1. FC Magdeburg	Opponent	Ref.
1	5 August 2016	18:00	Stadion Rieselwiese	Gardelegen	SSV 80 Gardelegen	5–0	2,155	Ernst 7'; Beck 66', 82'; Exslager 70', 80'		
2	4 September 2016	14:00	Stadion Vogelgesang	Rathenow	SSV Havelwinkel Warnau	8–0	1,264	Ernst 6', 46'; Sowislo 9'; Tarek Chahed 22', 30'; Düker 51', 81'; Walther 68' (o.g.)		
3	9 October 2016	14:00	Heinz-Förster-Sportanlage	Stendal	HSV Medizin Uchtspringe	7–1	1,883	Ernst 32', 40'; Brandt 45'; Kath 48'; Handke 83'; Exslager 85'; Beck 90'	Brinkmann 60'	
QF	13 November 2016	13:00	Stadion des Friedens	Braunsbedra	SV Merseburg 99	4–0	655	Beck 9', 85'; Schwede 58'; Düker 90'		
SF	19 April 2017	19:00	Erdgas Sportpark	Halle	Hallescher FC	3–1	7,809	Löhmannsröben 30'; Baumgärtel 82' (o.g.); Chahed 90+3'	Gjasula 67'	
F	13 August 2016	12:45	MDCC-Arena	Magdeburg	Germania Halberstadt	1–0	7,134	Sowislo 52'		

== Player information ==
As of 2 August 2016

No.	Pos	Nat	Player	Total		3. Liga		DFB-Pokal		Saxony-Anhalt Cup	
No.	Pos	Nat	Player	Apps	Goals	Apps	Goals	Apps	Goals	Apps	Goals
1	GK	(Germany) GER	Leopold Zingerle	2	0	0	0	1	0	1	0
2	DF	(Czech Republic) CZE	Lukáš Nový	1	0	0	0	0	0	1	0
3	DF	(Germany) GER	Christopher Handke	5	0	4	0	1	0	0	0
3	DF	(Germany) GER	Moritz Sprenger	5	0	4	0	1	0	0	0
5	DF	(Germany) GER	Felix Schiller	1	0	0	0	0	0	1	0
6	MF	(Germany) GER	Jan Löhmannsröben	6	0	4	0	1	0	1	0
7	FW	(Germany) GER	Maurice Exslager	6	2	4	0	1	0	1	2
8	DF	(Germany) GER	Steffen Puttkammer	3	0	2	0	1	0	0	0
9	FW	(Germany) GER	Manuel Farrona-Pulido	6	1	4	1	1	0	1	0
10	DF	(Germany) GER	Nico Hammann	4	1	3	0	1	1	0	0
11	FW	(Germany) GER	Christian Beck	6	6	4	4	1	0	1	2
12	GK	(Germany) GER	Jan Glinker	4	0	4	0	0	0	0	0
14	MF	(Germany) GER	Niklas Brandt	5	0	4	0	1	0	0	0
15	MF	(Germany) GER	Tobias Schwede	5	0	3	0	1	0	1	0
16	DF	(Germany) GER	Nils Butzen	6	0	4	0	1	0	1	0
17	MF	(Poland) POL	Marius Sowislo	0	0	0	0	0	0	0	0
18	MF	(Germany) GER	Florian Kath	2	0	2	0	0	0	0	0
19	DF	(Germany) GER	Michel Niemeyer	0	0	0	0	0	0	0	0
20	MF	(Germany) GER	Ahmed Waseem Razeek	3	1	3	1	0	0	0	0
21	FW	(Germany) GER	Julius Düker	1	0	0	0	0	0	1	0
22	MF	(Canada) CAN	André Hainault	3	0	2	0	0	0	1	0
24	MF	(Germany) GER	Tarek Chahed	5	0	3	0	1	0	1	0
25	MF	(Germany) GER	Sebastian Ernst	1	1	0	0	0	0	1	1
26	MF	(Germany) GER	Gerrit Müller	4	0	2	0	1	0	1	0
30	GK	(Germany) GER	Lukas Cichos	0	0	0	0	0	0	0	0

== Notes ==
A. Kickoff time in Central European Time/Central European Summer Time.
B. 1. FC Magdeburg goals first.
C. The match against Zwickau on matchday 2 had to be postponed as Zwickau's stadium was not completed and there was no replacement stadium available.
