= 2014–15 Bayer 04 Leverkusen season =

Bayer 04 Leverkusen
2014–15 season
- Sporting Director: Rudi Völler
- Manager: Roger Schmidt
- Stadium: BayArena
- Bundesliga: 4th
- DFB-Pokal: Quarter-finals
- UEFA Champions League: Round of 16
- Top goalscorer: League: Son Heung-min; Karim Bellarabi (11 each); All: Stefan Kießling (18)
Home colours	Away colours	Third colours

The 2014–15 Bayer 04 Leverkusen season was the 111th season in the club's football history.

== Season review ==
In the 2013–14 season, Bayer Leverkusen finished in fourth place in the Bundesliga. A very tight finish for the UEFA Champions League qualifier spot with both Borussia Mönchengladbach and VfL Wolfsburg all capable of getting fourth place. In the end, Leverkusen came back from 1–0 down to win the final game 2–1. This was a must win game for them because Wolfsburg had won their game and were in the running to finish fourth ahead of Leverkusen.

The transfer window started very early for Bayer Leverkusen as they have announced a five-year deal for Swiss international striker Josip Drmić who was previously with 1. FC Nürnberg, who were relegated on the final matchday. The transfer was announced on 12 May 2014.

== Players ==
As of 22 July 2014 Note: Flags indicate national team as defined under FIFA eligibility rules; some limited exceptions apply. Players may hold more than one non-FIFA nationality.

No.	Pos.	Nation	Player
3	MF	GER	Stefan Reinartz
4	DF	GER	Philipp Wollscheid
5	DF	BIH	Emir Spahić
6	MF	GER	Simon Rolfes (captain)
7	FW	KOR	Son Heung-min
8	MF	GER	Lars Bender (vice-captain)
9	FW	SUI	Josip Drmić
10	MF	TUR	Hakan Çalhanoğlu
11	FW	GER	Stefan Kießling
13	DF	GER	Roberto Hilbert
14	DF	GRE	Kyriakos Papadopoulos
15	MF	GER	Levin Öztunalı
16	DF	CRO	Tin Jedvaj (on loan from Roma)

No.	Pos.	Nation	Player
17	DF	POL	Sebastian Boenisch
18	DF	BRA	Wendell
19	MF	GER	Julian Brandt
21	DF	TUR	Ömer Toprak
22	GK	USA	David Yelldell
23	MF	AUS	Robbie Kruse
25	GK	CRO	Dario Krešić
26	DF	ITA	Giulio Donati
27	MF	GER	Gonzalo Castro (3rd captain)
35	MF	UKR	Vladlen Yurchenko
36	GK	GER	Niklas Lomb
37	MF	GER	Maximilian Wagener
38	MF	GER	Karim Bellarabi

=== Players out on loan ===
Note: Flags indicate national team as defined under FIFA eligibility rules; some limited exceptions apply. Players may hold more than one non-FIFA nationality.

No.	Pos.	Nation	Player
—	DF	GER	Malcolm Cacutalua (at Greuther Fürth)
—	DF	GRE	Kostas Stafylidis (at Fulham)
—	MF	GER	Dominik Kohr (at FC Augsburg)

No.	Pos.	Nation	Player
—	MF	FIN	Joel Pohjanpalo (at Fortuna Düsseldorf)
—	FW	POL	Arkadiusz Milik (at Ajax)
—	MF	KOR	Ryu Seung-woo (at Eintracht Braunschweig)

== Transfers ==
=== In ===
Note: Flags indicate national team as defined under FIFA eligibility rules; some limited exceptions apply. Players may hold more than one non-FIFA nationality.

No.	Pos.	Nation	Player
9	FW	SUI	Josip Drmić (from 1. FC Nürnberg)
25	GK	CRO	Dario Krešić (from Mainz 05)
35	MF	UKR	Vladlen Yurchenko (from Shakhtar Donetsk)
16	DF	CRO	Tin Jedvaj (from Roma)

== Competitions ==
=== Bundesliga ===
==== League table ====
Pos	Team	Pld	W	D	L	GF	GA	GD	Pts	Qualification or relegation
2	VfL Wolfsburg	34	20	9	5	72	38	+34	69	Qualification for the Champions League group stage
3	Borussia Mönchengladbach	34	19	9	6	53	26	+27	66	Qualification for the Champions League group stage
4	Bayer Leverkusen	34	17	10	7	62	37	+25	61	Qualification for the Champions League play-off round
5	FC Augsburg	34	15	4	15	43	43	0	49	Qualification for the Europa League group stage (Note: Since the winners of the 2014–15 DFB-Pokal, VfL Wolfsburg, qualified for the Champions League based on league position, the Europa League group stage spot was passed to the sixth-placed team, Schalke 04; and the Europa League third qualifying round spot was passed to the seventh-placed team, Borussia Dortmund.)
6	Schalke 04	34	13	9	12	42	40	+2	48	Qualification for the Europa League group stage

Source: DFB
Rules for classification: 1) points; 2) goal difference; 3) number of goals scored

==== Results summary ====
Overall								Home						Away					
Pld	W	D	L	GF	GA	GD	Pts	W	D	L	GF	GA	GD	W	D	L	GF	GA	GD
33	17	10	6	61	35	+26	61	10	6	1	39	15	+24	7	4	5	22	20	+2

Last updated: 16 May 2015.
Source: Competitive matches

==== Results by round ====
Round	1	2	3	4	5	6	7	8	9	10	11	12	13	14	15	16	17	18	19	20	21	22	23	24	25	26	27	28	29	30	31	32	33	34
Ground	A	H	H	A	H	A	H	A	H	A	H	A	H	A	H	A	H	H	A	A	H	A	H	A	H	A	H	A	H	A	H	A	H	A
Result	W	W	D	L	W	D	D	D	W	L	D	W	W	L	D	W	D	D	W	L	L	D	W	W	W	W	W	W	W	D	W	L	W	L
Position	1	1	1	5	2	3	4	6	5	5	6	4	3	4	3	4	3	6	5	6	6	6	4	4	4	4	4	4	3	4	4	4	4	4

Updated to match(es) played on 16 May 2015. Source: Competitive matches
A = Away; H = Home; W = Win; D = Draw; L = Loss

==== Matches ====
23 August 2014 1	Borussia Dortmund	0–2	Bayer Leverkusen	Dortmund
18:30 CEST (UTC+02:00)	Jojić (yellow card) 64'	Report	Bellarabi 1'; Jedvaj (yellow card) 45'; Toprak (yellow card) 51'; Kießling 90+5'	Stadium: Westfalenstadion; Attendance: 80,667; Referee: Deniz Aytekin

30 August 2014 2	Bayer Leverkusen	4–2	Hertha BSC	Leverkusen
15:30 CEST (UTC+02:00)	Jedvaj 50'; Spahić 62'; Brandt 74'; Bellarabi 86'	Report	Jedvaj 24' (o.g.); Schieber 60'; Niemeyer (yellow card) 64'	Stadium: BayArena; Attendance: 27,819; Referee: Tobias Stieler

12 September 2014 3	Bayer Leverkusen	3–3	SV Werder Bremen	Leverkusen
20:30 CEST (UTC+02:00)	Jedvaj 17'; Spahić (yellow card) 48'; Çalhanoğlu (yellow card) 52', (goal) 63'; Castro (yellow card) 67'; Son 73'; Reinartz (yellow card) 77'	Report	Bartels 45'; Di Santo 60'; Gálvez (yellow card) 77'; Prödl 84' (yellow card) 89'	Stadium: BayArena; Attendance: 30,210; Referee: Christian Dingert

21 September 2014 4	VfL Wolfsburg	4–1	Bayer Leverkusen	Wolfsburg
15:30 CEST (UTC+02:00)	Rodríguez 8' (pen.), 63'; Luiz Gustavo (yellow card) 11'; Vieirinha 45'; Hunt 81'	Report	Donati (red card) 7'; Bender (yellow card) 25'; Drmić 29'	Stadium: Volkswagen Arena; Attendance: 27,811; Referee: Deniz Aytekin

24 September 2014 5	Bayer Leverkusen	1–0	FC Augsburg	Leverkusen
20:00 CEST (UTC+02:00)	Jedvaj (yellow card) 1'; Son 33'; Reinartz (yellow card) 41'; Spahić (yellow card) 51'	Report	Kohr (yellow card) 39'; Caiuby (yellow card) 90+3'	Stadium: BayArena; Attendance: 23,081; Referee: Guido Winkmann

27 September 2014 6	SC Freiburg	0–0	Bayer Leverkusen	Freiburg im Breisgau
17:30 CEST (UTC+02:00)	Krmaš (yellow card) 40' (yellow-red card) 78'; Schuster (yellow card) 57'; Sorg (yellow card) 90'	Report	Spahić (yellow card) 8' (yellow-red card) 28'; Çalhanoğlu (yellow card) 21'; Son (yellow card) 36'; Jedvaj (yellow card) 45+1'; Bellarabi (yellow card) 90+1'	Stadium: Dreisamstadion; Attendance: 23,000; Referee: Felix Brych

4 October 2014 7	Bayer Leverkusen	2–2	SC Paderborn	Leverkusen
15:30 CEST (UTC+02:00)	Jedvaj (yellow card) 24'; Bender 42' (yellow card) 44'; Son (yellow card) 53'; Bellarabi 90'	Report	Hünemeier (yellow card) 6'; Koç 20'; Bakalorz (red card) 72'; Brückner (yellow card) 80'; Stoppelkamp 87'; Rupp (yellow card) 90+3'	Stadium: BayArena; Attendance: 30,210; Referee: Günter Perl

18 October 2014 8	VfB Stuttgart	3–3	Bayer Leverkusen	Stuttgart
15:30 CEST (UTC+02:00)	Leitner (yellow card) 27'; Werner 57'; Klein 67'; Niedermeier (yellow card) 73'; Harnik 76'; Gentner (yellow card) 86'	Report	Son 4', 9'; Hilbert (yellow card) 24'; Bellarabi 41'; Toprak (yellow card) 83'	Stadium: Mercedes-Benz Arena; Attendance: 40,900; Referee: Felix Zwayer

25 October 2014 9	Bayer 04 Leverkusen	1–0	Schalke 04	Leverkusen
18:30 CEST (UTC+02:00)	Toprak (yellow card) 14'; Çalhanoğlu 53'; Jedvaj (red card) 85'	Report	Höger (yellow card) 18'; Aogo (yellow card) 48'; Huntelaar (yellow card) 81'; Uchida (yellow card) 86'	Stadium: BayArena; Attendance: 30,210; Referee: Manuel Gräfe

1 November 2014 10	Hamburger SV	1–0	Bayer Leverkusen	Hamburg
15:30 CET (UTC+01:00)	Holtby (yellow card) 5'; Van der Vaart 26' (pen.) (yellow card) 35'; Behrami (yellow card) 41'; Drobný (yellow card) 45+2'; Diekmeier (yellow card) 45+5'; Müller (yellow card) 52'	Report	Spahić (yellow card) 28'; Donati (yellow card) 45+5'; Toprak (yellow card) 88'	Stadium: Volksparkstadion; Attendance: 52,990; Referee: Florian Meyer

8 November 2014 11	Bayer Leverkusen	0–0	Mainz 05	Leverkusen
15:30 CET (UTC+01:00)	Wendell (yellow card) 75'	Report	Bell (yellow card) 37'; Jara (yellow card) 57'; Koo (yellow card) 87'	Stadium: BayArena; Attendance: 29,714; Referee: Markus Schmidt

22 November 2014 12	Hannover 96	1–3	Bayer Leverkusen	Hanover
15:30 CET (UTC+01:00)	Gülselam (yellow card) 17', (goal) 60'; Prib (yellow card) 41'; Schmiedebach (yellow card) 79'	Report	Rolfes (yellow card) 16'; Kießling 46'; Son 58'; Bellarabi 71'	Stadium: Niedersachsenstadion; Attendance: 40,800; Referee: Marco Fritz

29 November 2014 13	Bayer Leverkusen	5–1	1. FC Köln	Leverkusen
15:30 CET (UTC+01:00)	Leno (yellow card) 4'; Bellarabi 26', 90'; Çalhanoğlu 61'; Drmić 79', 88'	Report	Lehmann 4' (pen.), (yellow card) 54'; Wimmer (yellow card) 62'	Stadium: BayArena; Attendance: 30,210; Referee: Thorsten Kinhöfer

6 December 2014 14	Bayer Munich	1–0	Bayer Leverkusen	Munich
18:30 CET (UTC+01:00)	Ribéry 51'	Report	Son (yellow card) 41'; Castro (yellow card) 68'; Bellarabi (yellow card) 89'	Stadium: Allianz Arena; Attendance: 71,000; Referee: Knut Kircher

14 December 2014 15	Bayer Leverkusen	1–1	Borussia Mönchengladbach	Leverkusen
15:30 CET (UTC+01:00)	Çalhanoğlu 18'; Wendell (yellow card) 28'; Kießling (yellow card) 49'; Jedvaj (yellow card) 62'; Bender (yellow card) 90+3'	Report	Brouwers 40'; Domínguez (yellow card) 51'	Stadium: BayArena; Attendance: 30,210; Referee: Peter Gagelmann

17 December 2014 16	1899 Hoffenheim	0–1	Bayer Leverkusen	Sinsheim
20:00 CET (UTC+01:00)	Strobl (yellow card) 4'	Report	Bender (yellow card) 44'; Boenisch (yellow card) 37'; Kießling 79'; Hilbert (yellow card) 89'	Stadium: Rhein-Neckar Arena; Attendance: 24,731; Referee: Daniel Siebert

20 December 2014 17	Bayer Leverkusen	1–1	Eintracht Frankfurt	Leverkusen
15:30 CET (UTC+01:00)	Spahić (yellow card) 28'; Kießling (yellow card) 58'; Wendell (yellow card) 74'; Bellarabi 83'	Report	Meier 37' (pen.); Chandler (yellow card) 64'; Hildebrand (yellow card) 90+1'	Stadium: BayArena; Attendance: 30,210; Referee: Wolfgang Stark

31 January 2015 18	Bayer Leverkusen	0–0	Borussia Dortmund	Leverkusen
18:30 CET (UTC+01:00)	Drmić (yellow card) 13'	Report	Schmelzer (yellow card) 31'; Kampl (yellow card) 39'	Stadium: BayArena; Attendance: 30,210; Referee: Knut Kircher

4 February 2015 19	Hertha BSC	0–1	Bayer Leverkusen	Berlin
20:00 CET (UTC+01:00)	Langkamp (yellow card) 28' (yellow-red card) 90'; Hegeler (yellow card) 33'; Ndjeng (yellow card) 90+4'	Report	Kießling 49'; Papadopoulos (yellow card) 51'; Wendell (yellow card) 79'	Stadium: Olympiastadion; Attendance: 34,636; Referee: Jochen Drees

8 February 2015 20	Werder Bremen	2–1	Bayer Leverkusen	Bremen
15:30 CET (UTC+01:00)	Selke 17'; Junuzović 29'; Fritz (yellow card) 53'	Report	Toprak (yellow card) 28'; Castro (yellow card) 33'; Çalhanoğlu 43'; Wendell (yellow card) 78'	Stadium: Weserstadion; Attendance: 39,653; Referee: Peter Sippel

14 February 2015 21	Bayer Leverkusen	4–5	VfL Wolfsburg	Leverkusen
15:30 CET (UTC+01:00)	Spahić (yellow card) 50' (yellow-red card) 82'; Son 57', 62', 67'; Boenisch (yellow card) 61'; Bellarabi 72'; Rolfes (yellow card) 79'; Papadopoulos (yellow card) 86'; Castro (yellow card) 88'	Report	Dost 6', 29', 63', 90+3'; Naldo 17', (yellow card) 75'	Stadium: BayArena; Attendance: 29,227; Referee: Bastian Dankert

21 February 2015 22	FC Augsburg	2–2	Bayer Leverkusen	Augsburg
15:30 CET (UTC+01:00)	Caiuby 59'; Hitz 90+4'	Report	Drmić 8'; Papadopoulos (yellow card) 44'; Bellarabi (yellow card) 75'; Reinartz 84'; Hilbert (yellow card) 90'	Stadium: SGL arena Attendance: 28,154; Referee: Tobias Welz

28 February 2015 23	Bayer Leverkusen	1–0	SC Freiburg	Leverkusen
15:30 CET (UTC+01:00)	Toprak (yellow card) 26'; Rolfes 33'	Report	Krmaš (yellow card) 9'; Philipp (yellow card) 17'	Stadium: BayArena; Attendance: 28,624; Referee: Robert Hartmann

8 March 2015 24	SC Paderborn	0–3	Bayer 04 Leverkusen	Paderborn
17:30 CET (UTC+01:00)	Ziegler (yellow card) 61'	Report	Spahić (yellow card) 36'; Papadopoulos 73'; Son 84', 90+3'	Stadium: Benteler Arena; Attendance: 14,905; Referee: Daniel Siebert

13 March 2015 25	Bayer Leverkusen	4–0	VfB Stuttgart	Leverkusen
20:30 CET (UTC+01:00)	Hilbert (yellow card) 27'; Wendell 32', (yellow card) 35'; Drmić 36', 59'; Çalhanoğlu (yellow card) 48'; Bellarabi 50'	Report	Dié (yellow card) 60'; Maxim (yellow card) 74'; Hloušek (yellow card) 84'	Stadium: BayArena; Attendance: 29,384; Referee: Tobias Stieler

21 March 2015 26	Schalke 04	0–1	Bayer 04 Leverkusen	Gelsenkirchen
17:30 CET (UTC+01:00)	Höger (yellow card) 59'; Neustädter (yellow card) 61'	Report	Hilbert (yellow card) 11'; Bellarabi 35', (yellow card) 81'; Papadopoulos (yellow card) 43'; Wendell (yellow card) 88'	Stadium: Veltins-Arena; Attendance: 61,973; Referee: Peter Gagelmann

4 April 2015 27	Bayer Leverkusen	4–0	Hamburger SV	Leverkusen
15:30 CEST (UTC+02:00)	Castro 7', 63'; Toprak (yellow card) 21'; Kießling 44', 56', (yellow card) 50'; Papadopoulos (yellow card) 77'	Report	Westermann (yellow card) 25'; Diekmeier (yellow card) 42'	Stadium: BayArena; Attendance: 30,210; Referee: Manuel Gräfe

11 April 2015 28	Mainz 05	2–3	Bayer Leverkusen	Mainz
15:30 CEST (UTC+02:00)	Soto (yellow card) 70'; Koo 78' (pen.), 90+1' (pen.)	Report	Son 15'; Wendell (yellow card) 28'; Jedvaj (yellow card) 35'; Kießling 59'; Çalhanoğlu 73'	Stadium: Coface Arena; Attendance: 31,578; Referee: Guido Winkmann

18 April 2015 29	Bayer Leverkusen	4–0	Hannover 96	Leverkusen
15:30 CEST (UTC+02:00)	Toprak 20'; Brandt 40'; Papadopoulos 49'; Kießling 70', (yellow card) 88'	Report	Gülselam (yellow card) 61'; Sakai (yellow card) 72'; Stindl (yellow card) 88'	Stadium: BayArena; Attendance: 29,482; Referee: Daniel Siebert

25 April 2015 30	1. FC Köln	1–1	Bayer Leverkusen	Cologne
15:30 CEST (UTC+02:00)	Gerhardt (yellow card) 44'; Wimmer (yellow card) 55'; Finne 83'	Report	Rolfes (yellow card) 17'; Son (yellow card) 24'; Brandt 60'; Toprak (yellow card) 90+4'	Stadium: RheinEnergieStadion; Attendance: 45,600; Referee: Deniz Aytekin

2 May 2015 31	Bayer Leverkusen	2–0	Bayern Munich	Leverkusen
18:30 CEST (UTC+02:00)	Çalhanoğlu 55'; Brandt 81'; Bellarabi (yellow card) 87'	Report	Dante (yellow card) 71'; Rafinha (yellow card) 87'; Schweinsteiger (yellow card) 89'; Weiser (yellow card) 90+1'	Stadium: BayArena; Attendance: 30,210; Referee: Christian Dingert

9 May 2015 32	Borussia Mönchengladbach	3–0	Bayer Leverkusen	Mönchengladbach
15:30 CEST (UTC+02:00)	Kruse 50'; Kramer (yellow card) 60'; Herrmann 81'; Xhaka (yellow card) 83'; Traoré 88'	Report	Bender (yellow card) 44'; Hilbert (yellow card) 61'; Toprak (yellow card) 87'	Stadium: Borussia-Park; Attendance: 53,761; Referee: Peter Gagelmann

16 May 2015 33	Bayer Leverkusen	2–0	1899 Hoffenheim	Leverkusen
15:30 CEST (UTC+02:00)	Çalhanoğlu 45+1'; Toprak (yellow card) 55'; Kießling 61'; Rolfes (yellow card) 71'	Report		Stadium: BayArena; Attendance: 29,072; Referee: Robert Hartmann

23 May 2015 34	Eintracht Frankfurt	2–1	Bayer Leverkusen	Frankfurt
15:30 CEST (UTC+02:00)	Seferovic 4'; Chandler (yellow card) 21'; Madlung 39'; Valdez (yellow card) 86'	Report	Bellarabi 6'	Stadium: Commerzbank-Arena; Attendance: 51,500; Referee: Guido Winkmann

=== DFB-Pokal ===
15 August 2014 Round 1	Alemannia Waldalgesheim	0–6	Bayer Leverkusen	Mainz
19:00 CEST (UTC+02:00)	Weingärtner (yellow card) 52'	Report	Kießling 2', 24', 31', 41' (pen.), 59'; Castro (yellow card) 54'; Son 82'	Stadium: Stadion am Bruchweg; Attendance: 7,524; Referee: Benjamin Brand

29 October 2014 Round 2	1. FC Magdeburg	2–2 (a.e.t.) (4–5 p)	Bayer Leverkusen	Magdeburg
19:00 CET (UTC+01:00)	Siefkes 28'; Brandt (yellow card) 90+4', (goal) 111'; Butzen (yellow card) 107'	Report	Çalhanoğlu 3'; Papadopoulos (yellow card) 63', (goal) 116'; Kießling (yellow card) 73'; Son (red card) 78'	Stadium: MDCC-Arena; Attendance: 23,855; Referee: Daniel Siebert
	Penalties
	Hammann (penalty scored); Bankert (penalty scored); Puttkammer (penalty scored); Hebisch (penalty missed); Brandt (penalty missed); Sowislo (penalty scored); Fuchs (penalty missed)		(penalty missed) Spahić; (penalty scored) Kruse; (penalty scored) Toprak; (penalty missed) Kießling; (penalty scored) J. Brandt; (penalty scored) Öztunalı; (penalty scored) Jedvaj

3 March 2015 Round 3	Bayer Leverkusen	2–0 (a.e.t.)	1. FC Kaiserslautern	Leverkusen
19:00 CET (UTC+01:00)	Toprak (yellow card) 11'; Spahić (yellow card) 50'; Çalhanoğlu 102'; Kießling 113'	Report	Jenssen (yellow card) 20'; Demirbay (yellow card) 85'	Stadium: BayArena; Attendance: 26,601; Referee: Guido Winkmann

8 April 2015 Quarterfinals	Bayer Leverkusen	0–0 (a.e.t.) (3–5 p)	Bayern Munich	Leverkusen
20:30 CEST (UTC+02:00)	Bender (yellow card) 50'; Toprak (yellow card) 104'; Papadopoulos (yellow card) 116'; Jedvaj (yellow card) 117'	Report	Dante (yellow card) 71'; Thiago (yellow card) 90+3'; Müller (yellow card) 116'	Stadium: BayArena; Attendance: 30,210; Referee: Felix Zwayer
	Penalties
	Drmić (penalty missed); Bender (penalty scored); Castro (penalty scored); Çalhanoğlu (penalty scored)		(penalty scored) Müller; (penalty scored) Lewandowski; (penalty scored) Alonso; (penalty scored) Götze; (penalty scored) Thiago

=== UEFA Champions League ===
==== Play-off round ====
19 August 2014 First leg	Copenhagen (Denmark)	2–3	(Germany) Bayer Leverkusen	Copenhagen, Denmark
20:45 CEST (UTC+02:00)	Jørgensen 9'; Amartey 13', (yellow card) 90+1'; Cornelius (yellow card) 51'	Report	Kießling 5'; Bellarabi (yellow card) 25', (goal) 31'; Donati (yellow card) 29'; Son 42'; Jedvaj (yellow card) 51'; Toprak (yellow card) 63'	Stadium: Telia Parken; Attendance: 18,221; Referee: Carlos Velasco Carballo (Spain)

27 August 2014 Second leg	Bayer Leverkusen (Germany)	4–0 (7–2 agg.)	(Denmark) Copenhagen	Leverkusen, Germany
20:45 CEST (UTC+02:00)	Son 2'; Çalhanoğlu 7'; Kießling 31' (pen.), 65'	Report	Amankwaa (yellow card) 30'; De Ridder (yellow card) 90+2'	Stadium: BayArena; Attendance: 23,321; Referee: Mark Clattenburg (England)

==== Group stage ====
Pos	Team	Pld	W	D	L	GF	GA	GD	Pts	Qualification	MON	LEV	ZEN	BEN
1	(France) Monaco	6	3	2	1	4	1	+3	11	Advance to knockout phase	—	1–0	2–0	0–0
2	(Germany) Bayer Leverkusen	6	3	1	2	7	4	+3	10	Advance to knockout phase	0–1	—	2–0	3–1
3	(Russia) Zenit Saint Petersburg	6	2	1	3	4	6	−2	7	Transfer to Europa League	0–0	1–2	—	1–0
4	(Portugal) Benfica	6	1	2	3	2	6	−4	5		1–0	0–0	0–2	—

Source: UEFA
Rules for classification: Group stage tiebreakers

16 September 2014 1	Monaco (France)	1–0	(Germany) Bayer Leverkusen	Monaco
20:45 CEST (UTC+02:00)	Carrasco (yellow card) 29'; Kurzawa (yellow card) 45+2'; Moutinho 61'	Report	Boenisch (yellow card) 65'; Spahić (yellow card) 74'	Stadium: Stade Louis II; Attendance: 8,130; Referee: Pavel Královec (Czech Republic)

1 October 2014 2	Bayer Leverkusen (Germany)	3–1	(Portugal) Benfica	Leverkusen, Germany
20:45 CEST (UTC+02:00)	Kießling 25'; Son 34'; Hilbert (yellow card) 60'; Çalhanoğlu 63' (pen.); Öztunalı (yellow card) 90+2'	Report	Gaitán (yellow card) 22'; Pérez (yellow card) 54'; Luisão (yellow card) 58'; Salvio 62', (yellow card) 70'; Samaris (yellow card) 88'	Stadium: BayArena; Attendance: 25,202; Referee: Martin Atkinson (England)

22 October 2014 3	Bayer Leverkusen (Germany)	2–0	(Russia) Zenit Saint Petersburg	Leverkusen, Germany
20:45 CEST (UTC+02:00)	Wendell (yellow card) 57' (yellow-red card) 79'; Donati 58'; Papadopoulos 63'	Report	Fayzulin (yellow card) 7'; García (yellow card) 15'; Hulk (yellow card) 16'; Criscito (yellow card) 90+5'; Rondón (yellow card) 90+5'	Stadium: BayArena; Attendance: 27,254; Referee: Björn Kuipers (Netherlands)

4 November 2014 4	Zenit Saint Petersburg (Russia)	1–2	(Germany) Bayer Leverkusen	Saint Petersburg, Russia
18:00 CET (UTC+01:00)	Danny (yellow card) 37'; Garay (yellow card) 67'; Witsel (yellow card) 76'; Shatov (yellow card) 82'; Rondón 89'	Report	Son 68', 73'; Donati (yellow card) 79'; Bellarabi (yellow card) 82'	Stadium: Petrovsky Stadium; Attendance: 17,010; Referee: Alberto Undiano Mallenco (Spain)

26 November 2014 5	Bayer Leverkusen (Germany)	0–1	(France) Monaco	Leverkusen, Germany
20:45 CET (UTC+01:00)	Spahić (yellow card) 26'	Report	Carvalho (yellow card) 42'; Ocampos 72'	Stadium: BayArena; Attendance: 26,230; Referee: Paolo Tagliavento (Italy)

9 December 2014 6	Benfica (Portugal)	0–0	(Germany) Bayer Leverkusen	Lisbon, Portugal
20:45 CET (UTC+01:00)	Cristante (yellow card) 36'	Report	Boenisch (yellow card) 26'; Toprak (yellow card) 32' (yellow-red card) 90+1'	Stadium: Estádio da Luz; Attendance: 17,564; Referee: Aleksei Kulbakov (Belarus)

==== Knockout phase ====
===== Round of 16 =====
25 February 2015 First leg	Bayer Leverkusen (Germany)	1–0	(Spain) Atlético Madrid	Leverkusen, Germany
20:45 CET (UTC+01:00)	Papadopoulos (yellow card) 36'; Çalhanoğlu 57'; Wendell (yellow card) 58'; Bender (yellow card) 62'; Castro (yellow card) 88'; Kießling (yellow card) 89'	Report	Tiago (yellow card) 22' (yellow-red card) 76'; Godín (yellow card) 60'; Torres (yellow card) 89'; Gámez (yellow card) 90+2'	Stadium: BayArena; Attendance: 29,079; Referee: Pavel Královec (Czech Republic)

17 March 2015 Second leg	Atlético Madrid (Spain)	1–0 (a.e.t.) (1–1 agg.) (3–2 p)	(Germany) Bayer Leverkusen	Madrid, Spain
20:45 CET (UTC+01:00)	Suárez 27', (yellow card) 75'; Giménez (yellow card) 30'; Gámez (yellow card) 72'; Torres (yellow card) 110'	Report	Spahić (yellow card) 26'; Toprak (yellow card) 65'; Çalhanoğlu (yellow card) 78'; Wendell (yellow card) 89'; Kießling (yellow card) 102'; Papadopoulos (yellow card) 113'	Stadium: Vicente Calderón Stadium; Attendance: 48,273; Referee: Nicola Rizzoli (Italy)
	Penalties
	García (penalty missed); Griezmann (penalty scored); Suárez (penalty scored); Koke (penalty missed); Torres (penalty scored)		(penalty missed) Çalhanoğlu; (penalty scored) Rolfes; (penalty missed) Toprak; (penalty scored) Castro; (penalty missed) Kießling

== Statistics ==
=== Goalscorers ===
This includes all competitive matches. The list is sorted by shirt number when total goals are equal.

Rank	Pos	No.	Nat	Name	Bundesliga	DFB-Pokal	Champions League	Total
1	FW	11	(Germany)	Stefan Kießling	8	6	4	18
2	FW	7	(South Korea)	Son Heung-min	11	1	5	17
3	MF	38	(Germany)	Karim Bellarabi	11	0	1	12
4	MF	10	(Turkey)	Hakan Çalhanoğlu	6	2	3	11
5	FW	9	(Switzerland)	Josip Drmić	6	0	0	6
6	DF	14	(Greece)	Kyriakos Papadopoulos	2	1	1	4
7	DF	16	(Croatia)	Tin Jedvaj	2	0	0	2
7	MF	19	(Germany)	Julian Brandt	2	0	0	2
7	MF	27	(Germany)	Gonzalo Castro	2	0	0	2
10	DF	4	(Bosnia and Herzegovina)	Emir Spahić	1	0	0	1
10	MF	8	(Germany)	Lars Bender	1	0	0	1
10	DF	26	(Italy)	Giulio Donati	0	0	1	1
10	MF	6	(Germany)	Simon Rolfes	1	0	0	1
10	MF	3	(Germany)	Stefan Reinartz	1	0	0	1
10	DF	18	(Brazil)	Wendell	1	0	0	1
10	DF	21	(Turkey)	Ömer Toprak	1	0	0	1
TOTALS					56	10	15	81

Last updated on 5 October 2014

=== Assists ===
This includes all competitive matches. The list is sorted by shirt number when total assists are equal.

Rank	Pos	No.	Nat	Name	Bundesliga	Champions League	DFB-Pokal	Total
1	MF	10	(Turkey)	Hakan Çalhanoğlu	5	4	0	9
2	MF	27	(Germany)	Gonzalo Castro	7	0	1	8
2	MF	38	(Germany)	Karim Bellarabi	4	3	1	8
4	FW	11	(Germany)	Stefan Kießling	3	2	0	5
4	DF	13	(Germany)	Roberto Hilbert	5	0	0	5
6	MF	19	(Germany)	Julian Brandt	1	0	3	4
7	FW	7	(South Korea)	Son Heung-min	2	1	0	3
7	MF	8	(Germany)	Lars Bender	3	0	0	3
9	DF	17	(Poland)	Sebastian Boenisch	1	0	1	2
10	MF	23	(Australia)	Robbie Kruse	1	0	0	1
10	DF	16	(Croatia)	Tin Jedvaj	1	0	0	1
10	DF	21	(Turkey)	Ömer Toprak	0	1	0	1
10	DF	18	(Brazil)	Wendell	1	0	0	1
10	FW	9	(Switzerland)	Josip Drmić	1	0	0	1
10	DF	21	(Greece)	Kyriakos Papadopoulos	1	0	0	1
Total					28	10	6	41

Last updated on 5 October 2014

== Kits ==
Home	Away	Away 2	Third

Type	Shirt	Shorts	Socks	First appearance / Info
Home	Red	Red	Red	
Away	Black	Black	Black	
Away 2	Black	Red	Black	Friendly match against Southampton
Third	White	White	White	
