= Patrick Siefkes =

German footballer (born 1990)

Personal information
- Date of birth: 12 January 1990 (age 36)
- Place of birth: Dessau, Germany
- Position: Goalkeeper

Team information
- Current team: SV Drochtersen/Assel
- Number: 30

Youth career
- 1999–2003: SV Dessau 05
- 2003–2004: Grün-Weiß Piesteritz
- 2004–2005: Hallescher FC
- 2005–2006: 1. FC Magdeburg
- 2006–2009: Carl Zeiss Jena

Senior career*
Years	Team	Apps	(Gls)
2009–2013	Carl Zeiss Jena II	45	(0)
2009–2013	Carl Zeiss Jena	6	(0)
2013–2015	Wacker Nordhausen	49	(0)
2015–	SV Drochtersen/Assel	292	(0)
- * Club domestic league appearances and goals as of 20 June 2026

Patrick Siefkes (born 12 January 1990) is a German footballer who plays as a goalkeeper for Regionalliga Nord club SV Drochtersen/Assel. He is related to Christoph Siefkes.
