= Ahmed Waseem Razeek =

Sri Lankan footballer

Personal information
- Full name: Ahmed Waseem Razeek
- Date of birth: 13 September 1994 (age 32)
- Place of birth: Berlin, Germany
- Height: 1.78 m (5 ft 10 in)
- Position: Winger

Youth career
- NFC Rot-Weiß Neukölln
- Tasmania Gropiusstadt
- -2011: Tennis Borussia Berlin
- 2011-2013: Union Berlin

Senior career*
Years	Team	Apps	(Gls)
2012-2015	Union Berlin II	34	(9)
2013-2014	Union Berlin	1	(0)
2015-2017	1. FC Magdeburg	36	(4)
2017-2018	Rot-Weiß Erfurt	29	(3)
2019-2021	Berliner AK 07	12	(2)
2021	Up Country Lions	9	(6)
2022	Gokulam Kerala	7	(1)
2023-2026	Eastern District	68	(38)

International career^{‡}
2019-	Sri Lanka	38	(13)
Medal record
Men's football
Representing Sri Lanka
2021 Four Nations Football Tournament
Runner-up	2021 Sri Lanka
- * Club domestic league appearances and goals as of 16 May 2026 ‡ National team caps and goals as of 8 November 2026

Ahmed Waseem Razeek (born 13 September 1994) is a professional footballer who plays as a right winger. Born in Germany, he represents the Sri Lanka national team.

== Club career ==
=== Early career ===
Razeek began playing football with NFC Rot-Weiß Neukölln, before moving to the youth program of Union Berlin via Tasmania Gropiusstadt and Tennis Borussia Berlin.

=== Union Berlin ===
He made his debut for Union Berlin II, who played in the Regionalliga Nordost, during the 2012-13 season. He finished the season with one goal in six matches. During the 2013-14 season, he split time between the first and second teams. For the reserve team, he again scored a goal in six matches. He signed a professional contract for the 2013–14 season and made his professional debut on 19 April 2014 when he was subbed in for Christopher Quiring in a 2. Bundesliga match against Karlsruher SC. This proved to be his only appearance for the first team as all of his appearances in the 2014–15 season was made with the second team. He finished the season with five goals in 21 appearances. This proved to be his last season with Union Berlin II. Union Berlin dissolved their second team.

=== 1. FC Magdeburg ===
Razeek signed a two-year contract with newly promoted 3. Liga side 1. FC Magdeburg. He made his debut against Rot-Weiß Erfurt on 24 July 2015. He was sent–off against Hallescher FC on 16 August 2015 after receiving his second yellow card. He finished the 2015–16 season with two goals in 23 appearances. He then finished the 2016–17 season with two goals in 13 appearances.

=== Rot-Weiss Erfurt ===
He played for Rot-Weiss Erfurt during the 2017-18 season. He scored three goals in 30 appearances.

=== Berliner AK 07 ===
Shortly before the 2019-20 season, Razeek joined Regionalliga Nordost club Berliner AK 07. During his one season at the club, he made 12 league appearances, scoring three goals.

=== Gokulam Kerala ===
On 24 March 2022, Razeek signed with I-League defending champions Gokulam Kerala.

Razeek scored on his debut for the club, on 9 April 2022, against Indian Arrows, which ended in a dominating 5–0 win. His team Gokulam Kerala clinched I-League title in 2021–22 season, defeating Kolkata Mohammedan 2–1 in the final game at the Salt Lake Stadium on 14 May, and became the first club in fifteen years to defend the title.

=== Eastern District ===
In January 2023, Razeek joined Hong Kong First Division League club Eastern District.

== International career ==
Razeek made his senior national team debut on 19 November 2019, in a 2022 FIFA World Cup qualification match against Turkmenistan.

Razeek scored his first international goals, a brace, on 5 June 2021, in a 2022 FIFA World Cup qualification match against Lebanon.

Razeek scored four goals on 9 November 2021, in a Four Nations Football Tournament match against Maldives to help his national team come from a 0–4 deficit to a 4–4 draw for his first international hat-trick.

== Career statistics ==
=== Club ===
As of 14 May 2022

Club	Season	League			Cup		Total		Ref.
Club	Season	Division	Apps	Goals	Apps	Goals	Apps	Goals	Ref.
Union Berlin II	2012-13	Regionalliga Nordost	6	1	-		6	1	
Union Berlin II	2013-14	Regionalliga Nordost	6	1	-		6	1	
Union Berlin II	2014-15	Regionalliga Nordost	21	5	-		21	5	
Union Berlin II	Total		33	7	0	0	33	7	-
Union Berlin	2013-14	2. Bundesliga	1	0	0	0	1	0	
Magdeburg	2015-16	3. Liga	23	2	-		23	2	
Magdeburg	2016-17	3. Liga	13	2	-		13	2	
Magdeburg	Total		36	4	0	0	36	4	-
Rot-Weiß Erfurt	2017-18	3. Liga	29	3	1	0	30	3	
Berliner AK 07	2019-20	Regionalliga Nordost	12	2	1	0	13	2	
Gokulam Kerala	2021-22	I-League	7	1	0	0	7	1	
Career total			118	17	2	0	120	17	-

=== International ===
As of matches played 8 November 2026

National team	Year	Apps	Goals
Sri Lanka	2019	1	0
Sri Lanka	2020	2	0
Sri Lanka	2021	10	9
Sri Lanka	2023	2	0
Sri Lanka	2024	7	0
Sri Lanka	2025	9	1
Sri Lanka	2026	7	3
Total		38	13

List of international goals scored by Ahmed Waseem Razeek
No.	Date	Venue	Opponent	Score	Result	Competition
1	5 June 2021	Goyang Stadium, Goyang, South Korea	Lebanon	1–0	2–3	2022 FIFA World Cup qualification
2	5 June 2021	Goyang Stadium, Goyang, South Korea	Lebanon	2-3	2–3	2022 FIFA World Cup qualification
3	8 November 2021	Colombo Racecourse, Colombo, Sri Lanka	Maldives	1–4	4–4	2021 Four Nations Football Tournament
4	8 November 2021	Colombo Racecourse, Colombo, Sri Lanka	Maldives	2–4	4–4	2021 Four Nations Football Tournament
5	8 November 2021	Colombo Racecourse, Colombo, Sri Lanka	Maldives	3–4	4–4	2021 Four Nations Football Tournament
6	8 November 2021	Colombo Racecourse, Colombo, Sri Lanka	Maldives	4–4	4–4	2021 Four Nations Football Tournament
7	16 November 2021	Colombo Racecourse, Colombo, Sri Lanka	Bangladesh	1–0	2–1	2021 Four Nations Football Tournament
8	16 November 2021	Colombo Racecourse, Colombo, Sri Lanka	Bangladesh	2–1	2–1	2021 Four Nations Football Tournament
9	19 November 2021	Colombo Racecourse, Colombo, Sri Lanka	Seychelles	3–1	3–3 (1–3 p)	2021 Four Nations Football Tournament
10	10 June 2025	Colombo Racecourse, Colombo, Sri Lanka	Chinese Taipei	3–0	3–1	2027 AFC Asian Cup qualification
11	8 June 2026	NT Stadium, Bangkok, Thailand	Bhutan	3–0	4–1	Friendly
12	30 September 2026	Stade Linité, Victoria, Seychelles	Seychelles	2–0	2–0	Friendly
13	8 November 2026	National Stadium, Dhaka, Bangladesh	Bhutan	2–1	2–2	2026 SAFF Championship

== Honours ==
Gokulam Kerala

- I-League: 2021-22

Individual

- 2021 Four Nations Football Tournament top scorer (7 goals)
