= Volksstimme (Saxony-Anhalt) =

German newspaper in Magdeburg

- Type: Daily newspaper (except Sundays)
- Publisher: Magdeburger Verlags- und Druckhaus GmbH
- Editor-in-chief: Marc Rath
- Language: German
- Headquarters: Magdeburg, Germany
- Circulation: 161,257 (as of 2018)
- Website: volksstimme.de

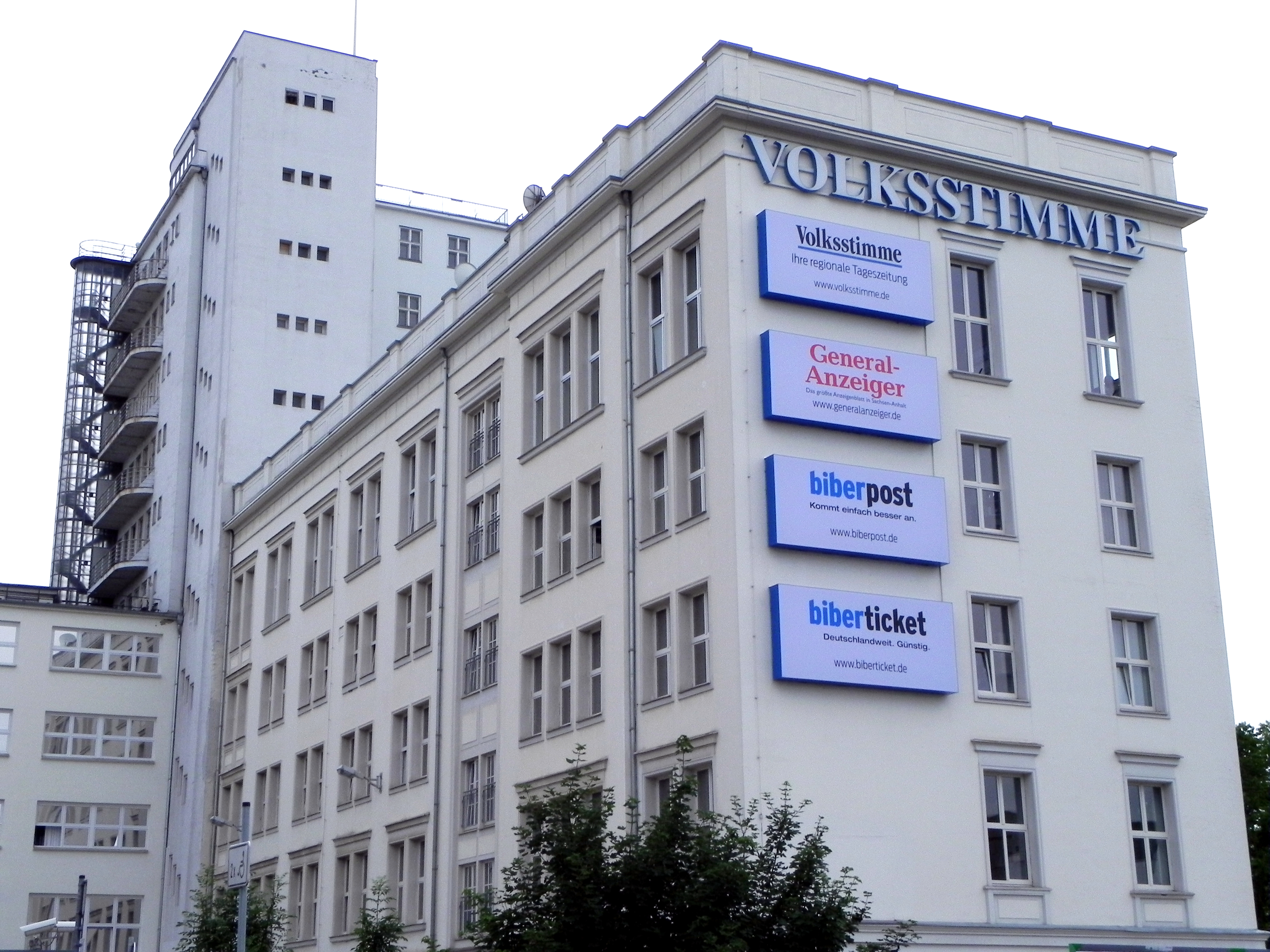
Volksstimme office building located near Magdeburg Hauptbahnhof

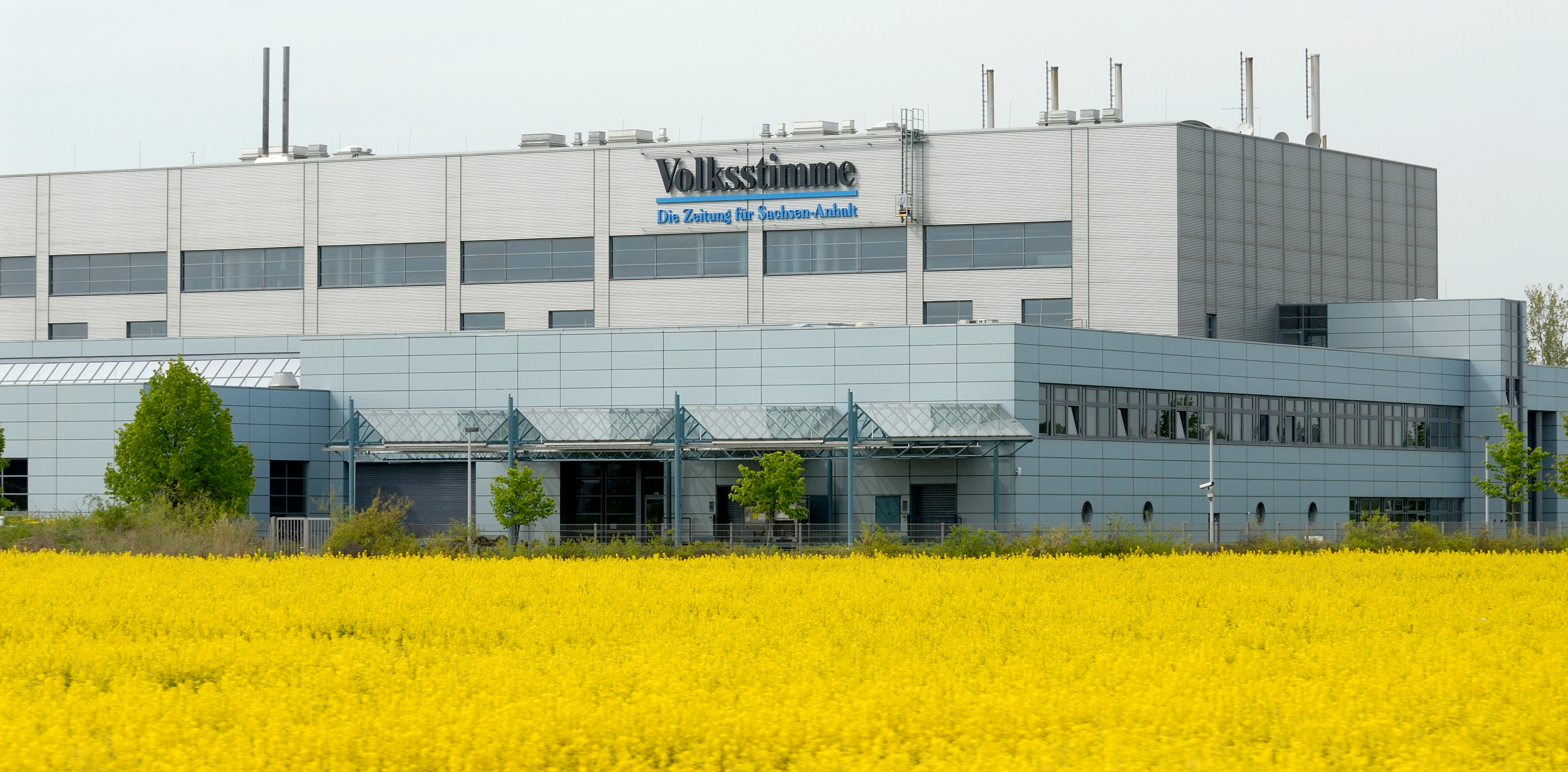
Volksstimme printing center located in Barleben near the Bundesautobahn 2

Volksstimme (meaning People's Voice in English) is a regional daily newspaper published in Magdeburg for northern Saxony-Anhalt, Germany. The paper is owned by Bauer. Its publisher is Magdeburger Verlags und Druckhaus.

The circulation of Volksstimme was 343,000 copies during the third quarter of 1992. Its circulation was 264,000 copies in 2001. The paper had an average circulation of 191,878 copies during the second quarter of 2011.

The Volksstimme is published by Mitteldeutsche Verlags- und Druckhaus GmbH, which is part of the Bauer Media Group. Since January 2020, the Bauer Media Group has also owned Mitteldeutsche Zeitung, the second major daily newspaper from Saxony-Anhalt.

== List of editors-in-chief ==
Editors-in-chief of the Volksstimme:

| Duration | Name |
|---|---|
| 1947 – 1950 | Robert Büchner |
| 1950 – 1953 | Arno Gropp |
| 1953 – 1958 | Karl Jakobi |
| 1958 – 1969 | Herbert Kopietz |
| 1969 – 1990 | Heinz Wiese |
| 1990 – 1992 | Karl-Heinz Schwarzkopf |
| 1992 – 1994 | Reinhold Stimpert |
| 1994 – 1999 | Heinzgeorg Oette |
| 1999 – 2001 | Paul-Josef Raue |
| 2001 – 2010 | Franz Kadell |
| 2010 – 2011 | Peter Wendt and Günther Tyllack (both provisional) |
| 2011 – 2023 | Alois Kösters |
| 2023 – present | Marc Rath |
