= Marcel Schlosser =

German footballer

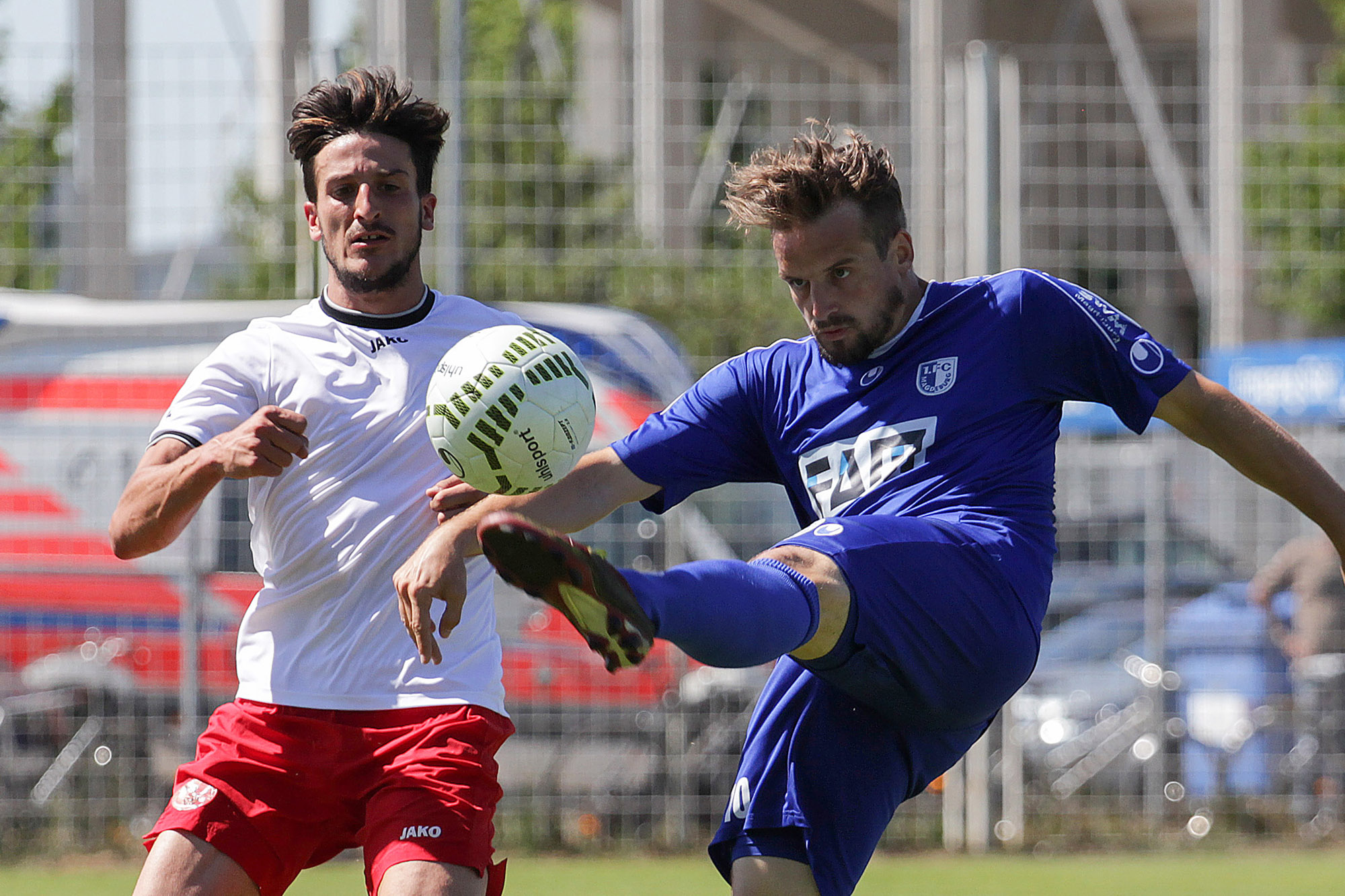
- Marcel Schlosser (right) in 2015

Personal information
- Date of birth: 8 August 1987 (age 39)
- Place of birth: Pobershau, East Germany
- Position: Left midfielder

Team information
- Current team: VfB Auerbach
- Number: 31

Youth career
- TSV Pobershau
- –2006: Chemnitzer FC

Senior career*
Years	Team	Apps	(Gls)
2006–2012	Chemnitzer FC	170	(26)
2012–2014	Carl Zeiss Jena	56	(16)
2014–2015	1. FC Magdeburg	24	(0)
2015–	VfB Auerbach	145	(31)
- * Club domestic league appearances and goals as of 22 December 2020

Marcel Schlosser (born 8 August 1987) is a German footballer who plays for VfB Auerbach.
