= Christian Beck (footballer) =

German footballer (born 1988)

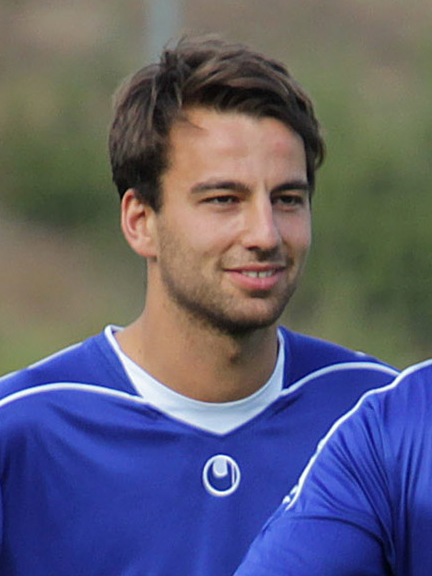
- Beck in 2015

Personal information
- Date of birth: 10 March 1988 (age 38)
- Place of birth: Erfurt, East Germany
- Height: 1.95 m (6 ft 5 in)
- Position: Forward

Team information
- Current team: FSV Schöningen
- Number: 11

Youth career
- 1996–2006: Rot-Weiß Erfurt

Senior career*
Years	Team	Apps	(Gls)
2006–2010	Rot-Weiß Erfurt II	30	(15)
2006–2010	Rot-Weiß Erfurt	25	(1)
2008–2009	→ Hallescher FC (loan)	18	(1)
2010–2011	Torgelower SV Greif	29	(7)
2011–2012	VfB Germania Halberstadt	34	(15)
2013–2021	1. FC Magdeburg	283	(124)
2021–2023	BFC Dynamo	68	(39)
2023–	FSV Schöningen	98	(35)
- * Club domestic league appearances and goals as of 20 June 2026

Christian Beck (born 10 March 1988) is a German professional footballer who plays as a forward for Regionalliga Nord club FSV Schöningen. During his professional career, Beck played for FC Rot-Weiß Erfurt, 1. FC Magdeburg and BFC Dynamo, among other teams.

== Career ==
Beck made his professional debut on 30 April 2010 in the 3. Liga for FC Rot-Weiß Erfurt in a 1–1 home draw with SV Wacker Burghausen.
