= Sven Reimann =

German footballer

Personal information
- Full name: Sven Reimann
- Date of birth: May 17, 1994 (age 32)
- Place of birth: Berlin, Germany
- Height: 1.86 m (6 ft 1 in)
- Position: Midfielder

Team information
- Current team: Hertha Zehlendorf
- Number: 20

Youth career
- Hertha Zehlendorf
- –2007: Lichterfelder FC
- 2007–2011: Tennis Borussia Berlin
- 2011–2013: Union Berlin

Senior career*
| Years | Team | Apps | (Gls) |
| 2011–2012 | Union Berlin | 0 | (0) |
| 2012–2014 | Union Berlin II | 30 | (5) |
| 2014–2016 | 1. FC Magdeburg | 20 | (0) |
| 2016–2017 | Carl Zeiss Jena | 27 | (2) |
| 2017–2023 | SV Babelsberg 03 | 96 | (8) |
| 2023– | Hertha Zehlendorf | 74 | (9) |
- * Club domestic league appearances and goals as of 22 June 2026

Sven Reimann (born 17 May 1994) is a German footballer who plays for Hertha Zehlendorf.

== Career statistics ==
As of 1 July 2019.

| Club | Season | League | | | Cup | | Other | | Total | |
| Club | Season | League | Apps | Goals | Apps | Goals | Apps | Goals | Apps | Goals |
|---|---|---|---|---|---|---|---|---|---|---|
| Union Berlin II | 2012–13 | Regionalliga Nordost | 3 | 0 | — | | — | | 3 | 0 |
| Union Berlin II | 2013–14 | Regionalliga Nordost | 27 | 5 | — | | — | | 27 | 5 |
| Union Berlin II | Totals | | 30 | 5 | 0 | 0 | 0 | 0 | 30 | 5 |
| Magdeburg | 2014–15 | Regionalliga Nordost | 17 | 0 | — | | 2 | 0 | 19 | 0 |
| Magdeburg | 2015–16 | 3. Liga | 4 | 0 | — | | — | | 4 | 0 |
| Magdeburg | Totals | | 21 | 0 | 0 | 0 | 2 | 0 | 23 | 0 |
| Carl Zeiss Jena | 2015–16 | Regionalliga Nordost | 13 | 2 | — | | | | 13 | 2 |
| Carl Zeiss Jena | 2016–17 | Regionalliga Nordost | 14 | 0 | — | | 2 | 0 | 16 | 0 |
| Carl Zeiss Jena | Totals | | 27 | 2 | 0 | 0 | 2 | 0 | 29 | 2 |
| SV Babelsberg 03 | 2017–18 | Regionalliga Nordost | 30 | 3 | — | | 0 | 0 | 30 | 3 |
| SV Babelsberg 03 | 2018–19 | Regionalliga Nordost | 17 | 1 | — | | 0 | 0 | 17 | 1 |
| SV Babelsberg 03 | 2019–20 | Regionalliga Nordost | 0 | 0 | — | | 0 | 0 | 0 | 0 |
| SV Babelsberg 03 | Totals | | 48 | 4 | 0 | 0 | 0 | 0 | 48 | 4 |
| Career totals | | | 126 | 11 | 0 | 0 | 4 | 0 | 130 | 11 |
