= Tobias Schwede =

German footballer

Personal information
- Date of birth: 17 March 1994 (age 32)
- Place of birth: Bremen, Germany
- Height: 1.81 m (5 ft 11 in)
- Position: Midfielder

Team information
- Current team: Teutonia Ottensen
- Number: 10

Youth career
- –2005: Habenhausener FV
- 2005–2016: Werder Bremen

Senior career*
Years	Team	Apps	(Gls)
2013–2016	Werder Bremen II	39	(2)
2014–2016	Werder Bremen III	9	(3)
2016–2018	1. FC Magdeburg	60	(8)
2018–2019	SC Paderborn	19	(1)
2019–2021	Wehen Wiesbaden	30	(0)
2021–2022	Hansa Rostock	14	(0)
2022	Saarbrücken	13	(0)
2023–	Teutonia Ottensen	7	(0)
- * Club domestic league appearances and goals as of 30 December 2023

Tobias Schwede (born 17 March 1994) is a German professional footballer who plays as a midfielder for Teutonia Ottensen.

== Career ==
In June 2022 it was announced Schwede would join 3. Liga club 1. FC Saarbrücken from 2. Bundesliga side Hansa Rostock.

On 17 July 2023, after being without a club for half a year, Schwede signed a contract with Teutonia Ottensen in Regionalliga Nord.
