= Jan Löhmannsröben =

German footballer (born 1991)

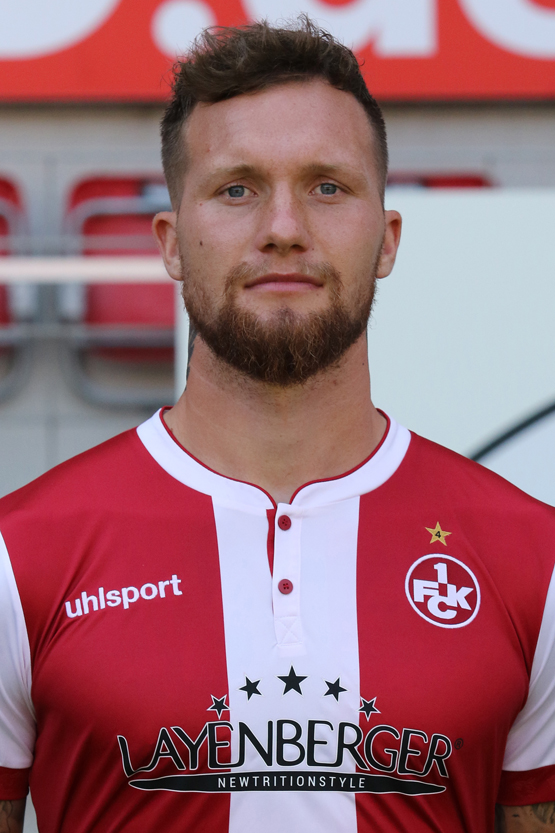
- Löhmannsröben with 1. FC Kaiserslautern in 2018

Personal information
- Full name: Jan Dominic Löhmannsröben
- Date of birth: 21 April 1991 (age 35)
- Place of birth: Kassel, Germany
- Height: 1.86 m (6 ft 1 in)
- Position: Midfielder

Team information
- Current team: Chemnitzer FC
- Number: 4

Youth career
- Potsdamer Kickers 94
- SV Babelsberg
- –2008: Hertha BSC
- 2008–2009: Eintracht Braunschweig
- 2009–2010: VfB Oldenburg

Senior career*
Years	Team	Apps	(Gls)
2010–2012	VfB Oldenburg	31	(1)
2012–2015	Wacker Nordhausen	57	(8)
2015–2017	1. FC Magdeburg	62	(3)
2017–2018	Carl Zeiss Jena	35	(1)
2018–2019	1. FC Kaiserslautern	26	(2)
2019	Wacker Nordhausen	11	(1)
2020	Preußen Münster	17	(0)
2020–2021	Hansa Rostock	38	(1)
2021–2022	Hallescher FC	20	(1)
2022–2023	FSV Zwickau	32	(0)
2023	Aiolikos	8	(0)
2024	Lokomotive Leipzig	12	(0)
2024–2026	Hallescher FC	61	(6)
2026–	Chemnitzer FC	10	(0)
- * Club domestic league appearances and goals as of 23 September 2026

Jan Dominico Löhmannsröben (born 21 April 1991) is a German professional footballer who plays as a midfielder for Regionalliga Nordost club Chemnitzer FC.

== Early life ==
Born in Kassel, he started playing football in Erlangen. His first club was Potsdamer Kickers 94, where he played for the F- to D-Youth teams. Subsequently, he went through the youth ranks of nearby SV Babelsberg and Hertha BSC.

== Career ==
In the summer 2019, Löhmannsröben returned to former club FSV Wacker 90 Nordhausen. In October 2019, he was relegated to the club's reserve team alongside four other teammates. On 23 December 2019, SC Preußen Münster confirmed that Löhmannsröben would join the club on 1 January 2020 on a deal for the rest of the season.

In August 2020, Lohmannröben joined FC Hansa Rostock. After the season he left the club on mutual agreement.

In September 2021 he signed a contract with 3rd division club Hallescher FC.

On 30 January 2024, he signed a contract with Regionalliga club 1. FC Lokomotive Leipzig, on a contract for the rest of the season.
