= Lukáš Nový =

Czech footballer (born 1990)

Personal information
- Full name: Lukáš Nový
- Date of birth: 17 December 1990 (age 35)
- Place of birth: Plzeň, Czechoslovakia
- Height: 1.80 m (5 ft 11 in)
- Position: Right back

Team information
- Current team: SV Neukirchen
- Number: 6

Youth career
- SK Slavia Vejprnice
- –2009: Viktoria Plzeň

Senior career*
Years	Team	Apps	(Gls)
2011–2014	TSG Neustrelitz	45	(1)
2014–2015	BFC Dynamo	21	(2)
2015–2017	1. FC Magdeburg	1	(0)
2017–2018	VfB Auerbach	28	(1)
2018–2020	Rot-Weiß Erfurt	33	(0)
2020–	SV Neukirchen	4	(2)

International career
	Czech Republic U18	8	(0)
2008–2009	Czech Republic U19	11	(0)
- * Club domestic league appearances and goals as of 19:58, 7 December 2020 (UTC)

Lukáš Nový (born 17 December 1990) is a Czech footballer who plays as a right-back for SV Neukirchen.
