= Matthias Tischer =

German footballer

Personal information
- Full name: Matthias Tischer
- Date of birth: 9 November 1985 (age 41)
- Place of birth: Magdeburg, East Germany
- Height: 1.87 m (6 ft 2 in)
- Position: Goalkeeper

Youth career
- –1996: Magdeburger SV 90 Preussen
- 1996–2005: 1. FC Magdeburg

Senior career*
Years	Team	Apps	(Gls)
2005–2016	1. FC Magdeburg	177	(0)
Total		177	(0)
- * Club domestic league appearances and goals

Matthias Tischer (born 9 November 1985) is a German former footballer who played as a goalkeeper, and who works as a coach for 1. FC Magdeburg.

== Career ==
Tischer joined 1. FC Magdeburg's youth team in 1996, having previously played youth football for Magdeburger SV 90 Preussen, and he was moved to the club's senior team in 2005, and made his first-team debut in the 2007–08 season. Tischer decided to end his career on 11 May 2016, but will continue his work at Magdeburg as their scout and goalkeeper coach.

== Honours ==
1. FC Magdeburg

Winner

- Saxony-Anhalt Cup: 2013–14
- Regionalliga Nordost: 2014–15
