= Burak Altıparmak =

German footballer (born 1990)

Burak Altiparmak
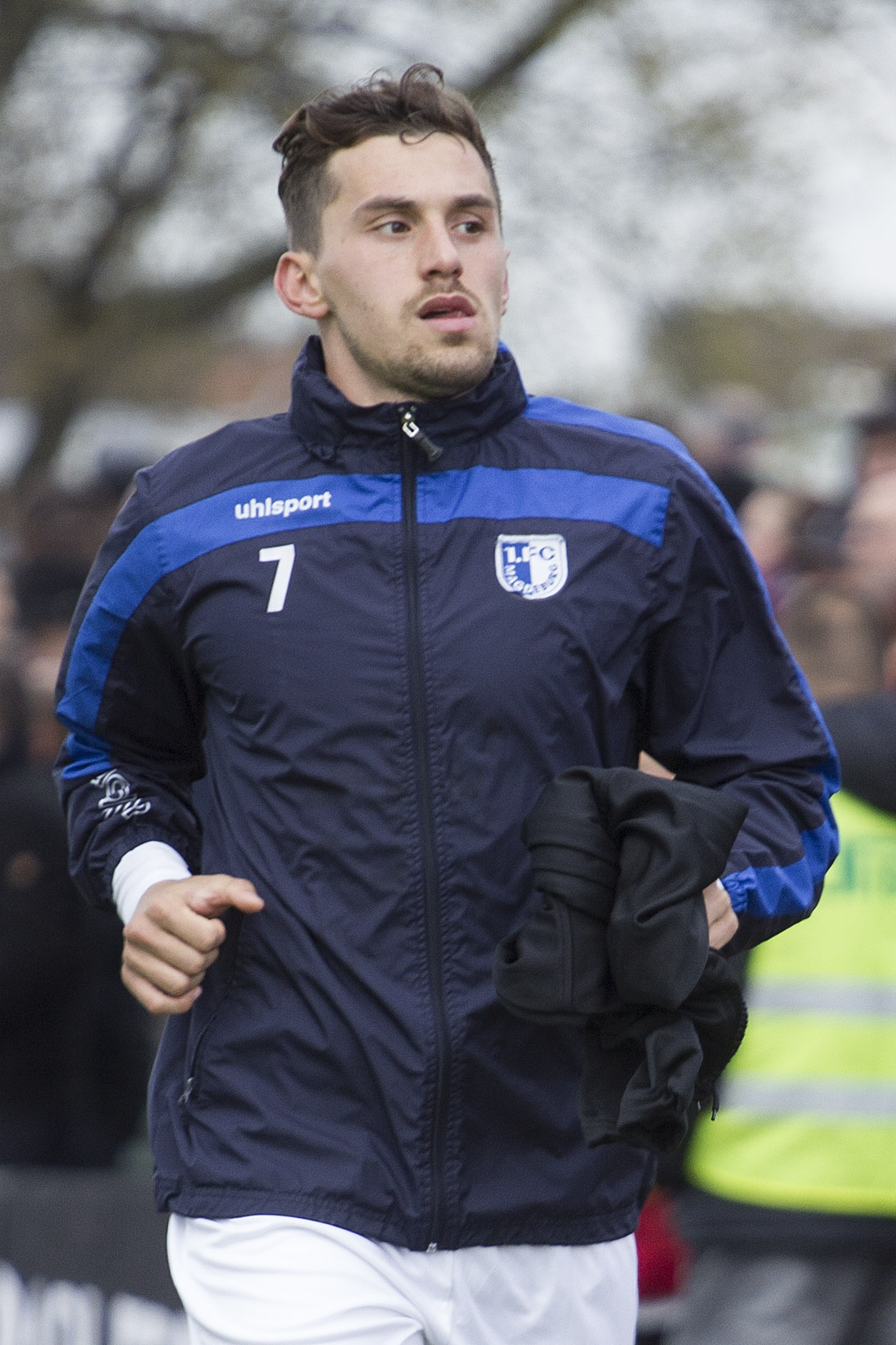

Personal information
- Date of birth: 15 October 1990 (age 36)
- Place of birth: Berlin, Germany
- Height: 1.78 m (5 ft 10 in)
- Position: Defender

Team information
- Current team: Kütahyaspor
- Number: 36

Youth career
- Hilalspor Berlin
- Türkiyemspor Berlin
- –2006: BSV Hürtürkel
- 2006–2007: SV Tasmania Berlin
- 2007–2009: Hertha Zehlendorf

Senior career*
Years	Team	Apps	(Gls)
2009–2011	VfL Wolfsburg II	12	(1)
2011–2013	Berliner AK 07	60	(13)
2013–2015	Osmanlıspor	10	(0)
2014–2015	→ Polatlı Bugsaşspor (loan)	35	(1)
2015–2016	1. FC Magdeburg	24	(1)
2016–2019	Denizlispor	85	(0)
2019–2022	Bursaspor	90	(5)
2022–2024	Manisa	65	(5)
2024–2025	Iğdır	16	(2)
2025–2026	Sakaryaspor	33	(0)
2026	Elazığspor	12	(0)
2026–	Kütahyaspor	5	(0)
- * Club domestic league appearances and goals as of 14 November 2026

Burak Altiparmak (born 15 October 1990) is a German footballer who plays for TFF 2. Lig club Kütahyaspor.

== Career ==
Altiparmak began playing football in his hometown Berlin, at BSV Hürtürkel, before joining the youth programs at SV Tasmania Berlin and later Hertha Zehlendorf. In 2009, he moved to VfL Wolfsburg, but played in the reserve side only and the left the club again in 2011, joining Berliner AK 07. He established himself in the first team at his new club and appeared in 60 of the 64 league matches the club played while he was there. He was also part of the team that upset Bundesliga side TSG 1899 Hoffenheim 4–0 in the first round of the 2012–13 DFB-Pokal.

In 2013 Altiparmak joined Turkish TFF First League side Osmanlıspor on a three-year contract, but was sent to third-tier side Polatlı Bugsaşspor in the winter break. After spending the preseason back with Osmanlıspor for 2015–16 Süper Lig season, he dissolved his contract on 28 August 2015 to join German third-tier side 1. FC Magdeburg. There Altiparmak would be reunited with manager Jens Härtel under whom he had played at Berliner AK. He made his debut for Magdeburg in a 1–0 loss against Stuttgarter Kickers on September 11, 2015.
