= Kevin Kruschke =

German footballer

Personal information
- Full name: Kevin Kruschke
- Date of birth: August 19, 1991 (age 35)
- Place of birth: Germany
- Position: Midfielder

Team information
- Current team: 1. FC Magdeburg
- Number: 15

Senior career*
Years	Team	Apps	(Gls)
2011–2014	Berliner AK 07	58	(12)
2014–2016	1. FC Magdeburg	31	(1)
2016–	SV Rödinghausen		
- * Club domestic league appearances and goals as of 20:56, 2 October 2015 (UTC)

Kevin Kruschke (born 19 August 1991) is a German footballer who plays for SV Rödinghausen.
