= Lukas Cichos =

German footballer

Personal information
- Date of birth: 18 December 1995 (age 30)
- Place of birth: Zeitz, Germany
- Height: 1.91 m (6 ft 3 in)
- Position: Goalkeeper

Team information
- Current team: Germania Halberstadt
- Number: 1

Youth career
- –2008: 1. FC Zeitz
- 2008–2014: 1. FC Magdeburg

Senior career*
Years	Team	Apps	(Gls)
2013–2018	1. FC Magdeburg	0	(0)
2014–2015	1. FC Magdeburg II	5	(0)
2017–2018	→ FSV Zwickau (loan)	1	(0)
2018–2020	FC Rot-Weiss Erfurt	33	(0)
2021–	Germania Halberstadt	130	(0)
- * Club domestic league appearances and goals as of 30 June 2026

Lukas Cichos (born 18 December 1995) is a German footballer who plays as a goalkeeper for Germania Halberstadt.

== Club career ==
=== 1. FC Magdeburg ===
Cichos is a graduate of the 1. FC Magdeburg youth academy.

=== FSV Zwickau ===
In July 2017, Cichos was loaned out to 3. Liga side FSV Zwickau. He made his first and only league appearance during his loan on 5 May 2018 in a 1–0 home victory over Fortuna Köln.

=== Rot-Weiss Erfurt ===
In July 2018, Cichos moved to Regionalliga Nordost side Rot-Weiß Erfurt. He made his league debut for the club on 28 July 2018 in a 3–0 away victory over VSG Altglienicke.
