= Ryan Malone (soccer) =

American soccer player

Personal information
- Full name: Ryan Patrick Malone
- Date of birth: August 11, 1992 (age 34)
- Place of birth: Chicopee, Massachusetts, United States
- Height: 1.90 m (6 ft 3 in)
- Positions: Center-back; defensive midfielder

Team information
- Current team: Energie Cottbus
- Number: 16

College career
Years	Team	Apps	(Gls)
2010–2014	Springfield Pride	66	(28)

Senior career*
Years	Team	Apps	(Gls)
2011–2012	Western Mass Pioneers	20	(7)
2015–2016	1. FC Magdeburg	9	(2)
2016–2017	Stuttgarter Kickers	26	(4)
2017–2019	Lokomotive Leipzig	60	(19)
2019–2021	VfB Lübeck	46	(4)
2021–2023	Hansa Rostock	53	(1)
2023–2025	FC Ingolstadt 04	56	(4)
2025–2026	Erzgebirge Aue	32	(3)
2026–	Energie Cottbus	0	(0)
- * Club domestic league appearances and goals as of May 30, 2026

Ryan Patrick Malone (born August 11, 1992) is an American professional soccer player who plays as a center-back or defensive midfielder for German 2. Bundesliga club Energie Cottbus.

== Career ==
=== College career ===
Malone played for Springfield College from 2010 to 2015. In his first season, he made 20 appearances, scoring nine goals, but was forced to sit out the 2011 season due to an injury. After playing four seasons with Springfield, he finished his career with 66 appearances and scored 28 goals.

=== Professional career ===
Following his collegiate career, he signed with 1. FC Magdeburg on June 1, 2015. He made his debut in a 3–0 win against VfL Osnabrück on September 15, 2015, playing for six minutes. His first goal came in a 1–0 win against Wehen Wiesbaden. At the end of the season, Magdeburg decided not to extend the contract. In manager Jens Härtel's opinion, Malone needed regular soccer to develop and the club were unable to guarantee that.

During the summer break, Malone signed a contract with Regionalliga Südwest side Stuttgarter Kickers.

On June 20, 2017, it was announced Malone had moved on from Kickers and joined 1. FC Lokomotive Leipzig on a two-year deal.

On May 26, 2025, Malone signed with Erzgebirge Aue in 3. Liga.

On June 24, 2026, Malone joined Energie Cottbus in 2. Bundesliga.

== Personal life ==
A Chicopee, Massachusetts, native, Malone holds a degree in Sport Management.

== Career statistics ==
=== Career ===
As of match played 12 March 2024

Club	Season	League			National Cup		Total	
Club	Season	Division	Apps	Goals	Apps	Goals	Apps	Goals
Western Mass Pioneers	2011	Premier Development League	4	2	—		4	2
Western Mass Pioneers	2012	Premier Development League	16	5	—		16	5
Western Mass Pioneers	Total		20	7	—		20	7
1. FC Magdeburg	2015-16	3. Liga	9	2	—		9	2
Stuttgarter Kickers	2016-17	Regionalliga	26	4	—		26	4
Lokomotive Leipzig	2017-18	Regionalliga	30	10	—		30	10
Lokomotive Leipzig	2018-19	Regionalliga	30	9	—		30	9
Lokomotive Leipzig	Total		60	19	—		60	19
VfB Lübeck	2019-20	Regionalliga	23	2	1	0	24	2
VfB Lübeck	2020-21	3. Liga	23	2	—		23	2
VfB Lübeck	Total		46	4	1	0	47	4
Hansa Rostock	2021-22	2. Bundesliga	23	0	2	0	25	0
Hansa Rostock	2022-23	2. Bundesliga	30	1	1	0	31	1
Hansa Rostock	Total		53	1	3	0	56	1
FC Ingolstadt 04	2023-24	3. Liga	25	0	—		25	0
Career Total			239	33	4	0	243	33
