= Christoph Siefkes =

German footballer

Personal information
- Date of birth: 20 February 1991 (age 35)
- Place of birth: Dessau, Germany
- Height: 1.77 m (5 ft 10 in)
- Position: Midfielder

Youth career
- –2009: Hallescher FC

Senior career*
Years	Team	Apps	(Gls)
2009–2010	Hallescher FC	1	(0)
2010–2014	Bayer Leverkusen II	78	(11)
2011–2012	→ Carl Zeiss Jena (loan)	20	(0)
2011–2012	→ Carl Zeiss Jena II (loan)	5	(1)
2014–2015	1. FC Magdeburg	23	(0)
Total		127	(12)
- * Club domestic league appearances and goals

Christoph Siefkes (born 20 February 1991) is a German former professional footballer who played as a midfielder. He is related to Patrick Siefkes, who plays as a goalkeeper for SV Drochtersen/Assel.

== Career ==
Siefkes began his career with Hallescher FC, where he scored prolifically for the youth team, and made one appearance for the first-team, as a substitute for Angelo Hauk in a Regionalliga Nord match against SV Wilhelmshaven in May 2010. Shortly after this, he signed for Bayer Leverkusen, to play for the reserve team. After one season he signed a year-long loan deal with Carl Zeiss Jena, where he played alongside his brother, and made 20 appearances in the 3. Liga. The season ended in relegation for Jena, and Christoph returned to Leverkusen for the 2012–13 season.
