= Manuel Farrona-Pulido =

German footballer

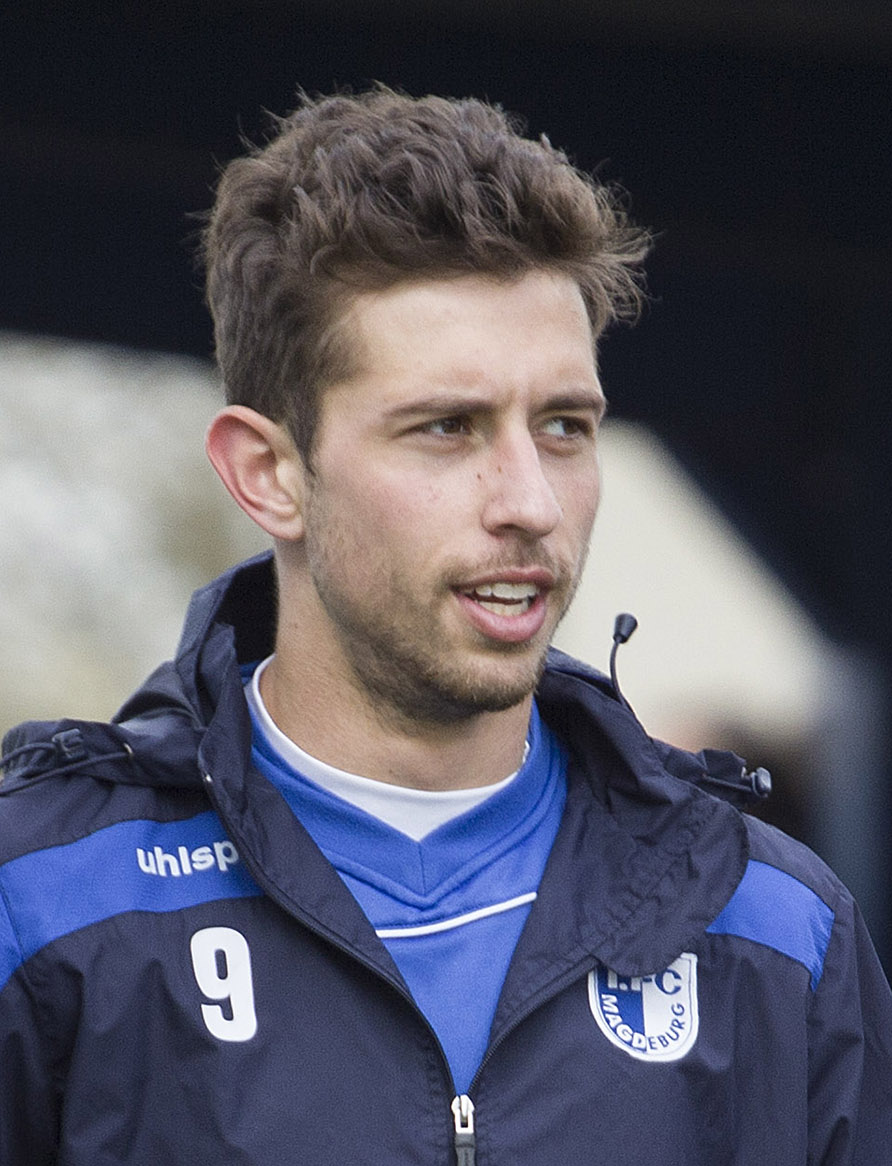
- Farrona-Pulido in 2016

Personal information
- Date of birth: 1 May 1993 (age 33)
- Place of birth: Kaltenkirchen, Germany
- Height: 1.75 m (5 ft 9 in)
- Position: Midfielder

Team information
- Current team: VfB Lübeck
- Number: 10

Youth career
- Tus Hemdingen-Bilsen
- –2006: Holsatia Elmshorn
- 2006–2012: Hamburger SV

Senior career*
| Years | Team | Apps | (Gls) |
| 2012–2014 | Hamburger SV II | 49 | (10) |
| 2014–2015 | Wacker Nordhausen | 26 | (9) |
| 2015–2017 | 1. FC Magdeburg | 54 | (7) |
| 2017–2018 | Fortuna Köln | 26 | (3) |
| 2018–2020 | VfL Osnabrück | 37 | (5) |
| 2020–2021 | Hansa Rostock | 23 | (4) |
| 2021–2022 | SC Preußen Münster | 26 | (4) |
| 2022– | VfB Lübeck | 113 | (24) |

International career^{‡}
| 2010 | Germany U18 | 2 | (0) |
- * Club domestic league appearances and goals as of 20 June 2026 ‡ National team caps and goals as of 31 July 2017

Manuel Farrona-Pulido (born 1 May 1993) is a German professional footballer who plays as a midfielder for VfB Lübeck.

== Club career ==
Farrona-Pulido started playing youth football at Hemdingen-Bilsen before he moved on to Holsatia Elmshorn and eventually the youth department at Hamburger SV in 2006. Although he played for the club's reserve team from 2012, he could not break into the first team and moved to Wacker Nordhausen in 2014 where he scored nine goals in 26 matches before joining newly promoted 1. FC Magdeburg for the new 2015–16 3. Liga season.

== International career ==
Farrona-Pulido was born in Germany and is of Spanish descent. In 2010, Farrona-Pulido played two matches for Germany's Under-18 national team against Ukraine and Turkey.

== Career statistics ==
As of match played on 1 September 2021

Appearances and goals by club, season and competition
| Club | Season | League | | | Cup | | League Cup | | Other | | Total | |
| Club | Season | Division | Apps | Goals | Apps | Goals | Apps | Goals | Apps | Goals | Apps | Goals |
|---|---|---|---|---|---|---|---|---|---|---|---|---|
| Hamburger SV II | 2011–12 | Regionalliga Nord | 2 | 1 | — | | — | | — | | 2 | 1 |
| Hamburger SV II | 2012–13 | Regionalliga Nord | 26 | 6 | — | | — | | — | | 26 | 6 |
| Hamburger SV II | 2013–14 | Regionalliga Nord | 21 | 3 | — | | — | | — | | 21 | 3 |
| Hamburger SV II | Total | | 49 | 10 | 0 | 0 | 0 | 0 | 0 | 0 | 49 | 10 |
| Wacker Nordhausen | 2014–15 | Regionalliga Nordost | 26 | 9 | 0 | 0 | — | | — | | 26 | 9 |
| 1. FC Magdeburg | 2015–16 | 3. Liga | 30 | 4 | 0 | 0 | — | | — | | 30 | 4 |
| 1. FC Magdeburg | 2016–17 | 3. Liga | 24 | 3 | 1 | 0 | — | | — | | 25 | 3 |
| 1. FC Magdeburg | Total | | 54 | 7 | 1 | 0 | 0 | 0 | 0 | 0 | 55 | 7 |
| Fortuna Köln | 2017–18 | 3. Liga | 26 | 3 | 0 | 0 | — | | — | | 26 | 3 |
| VfL Osnabrück | 2018–19 | 3. Liga | 30 | 5 | 0 | 0 | — | | — | | 30 | 5 |
| VfL Osnabrück | 2019–20 | 2. Bundesliga | 7 | 0 | 0 | 0 | — | | — | | 7 | 0 |
| VfL Osnabrück | Total | | 37 | 5 | 0 | 0 | 0 | 0 | 0 | 0 | 37 | 5 |
| Hansa Rostock | 2020–21 | 3. Liga | 23 | 4 | 1 | 0 | — | | — | | 24 | 4 |
| Career total | | | 215 | 38 | 2 | 0 | 0 | 0 | 0 | 0 | 217 | 38 |
