= VfB Germania Halberstadt =

German association football club from Halberstadt, Saxony-Anhalt

- Full name: Verein für Bewegungsspiele Germania Halberstadt e. V.
- Founded: 1949
- Ground: Friedensstadion
- Capacity: 4,999
- Chairman: Olaf Herbst
- Manager: Manuel Rost
- League: NOFV-Oberliga Süd (V)
- 2025–26: NOFV-Oberliga Süd, 5th of 16
Home colours	Away colours

VfB Germania Halberstadt is a German football club from Halberstadt in Saxony-Anhalt.

== History ==
The club was founded on 26 October 1949 as Betriebssportgemeinschaft Reichsbahn Halberstadt before being renamed BSG Lokomotive Halberstadt in 1950. Through the 1970s the team played in the East German third division DDR-Bezirksliga.

After German reunification in 1990 the team was re-established as Eisenbahnsportverein Halberstadt and spent two seasons in the Verbandsliga Sachsen-Anhalt (IV) before slipping to the Landesliga Sachsen-Anhalt in 1992. Formed as a sports club for railway workers, the number of rail workers actually represented in the membership of the club dropped below 20% and it lost its affiliation with the Railway Sports Federation in 1993. The club became VfB Halberstadt that year while the footballers went their own way in 1994 as Fußball Club Germania Halberstadt, adopting the heritage of a local pre-war side. VfB Germania Halberstadt was formed when the two clubs were reunited in 1997.

A third-place result in the Landesliga Sachsen-Anhalt Mitte (VI) and successful promotion playoff returned Halberstadt to Verbandsliga (V) competition in 2000, and after winning the division title in 2003, they advanced to the Oberliga Nordost-Süd (IV). They went on to win the Oberliga (V) in 2011 and advance to the Regionalliga Nord (IV). That league saw Germania and other northeastern clubs move to the Regionalliga Nordost on its refoundation in 2012 where it played for the next four seasons until relegation in 2016. It was immediately promoted back to the Regionalliga Nordost in 2017 after finishing runners-up in the Oberliga Süd and beating Optik Rathenow in a play-off.

== Current squad ==
As of 11 March 2023

Note: Flags indicate national team as defined under FIFA eligibility rules; some limited exceptions apply. Players may hold more than one non-FIFA nationality.

No.	Pos.	Nation	Player
1	GK	GER	Lukas Cichos (captain)
3	DF	GER	Simran Dhaliwal
4	DF	GER	Fynn Kleeschätzky
5	DF	GER	Bastian Schrewe
6	DF	GER	Hendrik Kuhnhold
7	DF	GER	Pascal Hackethal
8	DF	GER	Paul Grzega
9	FW	UKR	Ilya Glynianyi
10	MF	GER	Jona Renner
14	MF	GER	Silvio Rust
15	MF	USA	Creighton Braun
16	MF	GER	Nikita Marusenko

No.	Pos.	Nation	Player
17	FW	GER	Irwin Pfeiffer
18	DF	FRA	Jean-Cedric Bro
19	FW	GER	Louis Malina
23	FW	GER	Bennet Mingramm
24	FW	DOM	Darlin van der Werff
25	DF	GER	Nico Lübke
27	MF	GER	Nick Paul Sauer
28	DF	GER	Patrick Baudis
31	MF	GER	Ole Hoch
32	GK	GER	Fabian Guderitz
33	GK	GER	Pascal Sparwasser
34	FW	GER	Justin Eilers

== Honours ==
The club's honours:

- NOFV-Oberliga Süd (V)
  - Champions: 2010–11
  - Runners-up: 2016–17
- Verbandsliga Sachsen-Anhalt (V)
  - Champions: 2002–03
- Saxony-Anhalt Cup
  - Runners-up: 2009–10, 2012–13, 2016–17, 2019, 2024, 2026
