= Nicolas Hebisch =

German footballer (born 1990)

Personal information
- Date of birth: 26 March 1990 (age 36)
- Place of birth: West Berlin, West
- Height: 1.91 m (6 ft 3 in)
- Position: Forward

Team information
- Current team: Hertha Zehlendorf
- Number: 16

Youth career
- 1997–2001: Spandauer BC
- 2001–2004: SC Staaken
- 2004: Nordberliner SC
- 2005–2007: SV Tasmania-Gropiusstadt 1973
- 2007–2009: Tennis Borussia Berlin

Senior career*
Years	Team	Apps	(Gls)
2009–2013	SV Babelsberg 03	82	(9)
2013	Berliner AK	16	(7)
2013–2014	FSV Zwickau	9	(1)
2014	TSG Neustrelitz	9	(4)
2014–2016	1. FC Magdeburg	48	(10)
2016–2018	SV Waldhof Mannheim	57	(21)
2018–2019	Viktoria Köln	0	(0)
2019–2021	VfB Lübeck	24	(6)
2021–2023	Viktoria Aschaffenburg	57	(10)
2023–2025	Viktoria Berlin	57	(6)
2025–	Hertha Zehlendorf	29	(2)
- * Club domestic league appearances and goals as of 22 June 2026

Nicolas Hebisch (born 26 March 1990) is a German professional footballer who plays as a forward for Regionalliga Nordost club Hertha Zehlendorf.

== Career ==
Hebisch played youth football for several clubs in and around Berlin, before joining SV Babelsberg as a 19-year-old in 2009. In his first season, he helped the club win the Regionalliga Nord, and promotion to the 3. Liga, and made his first appearance at this level in September 2010, as a substitute for Dominik Stroh-Engel in a 2–0 win over Werder Bremen II. After three and a half years and 82 league appearances for the club, Hebisch was released on a free transfer in January 2013. He signed for Berliner AK shortly afterwards, where he spent a successful six months before moving to FSV Zwickau in July 2013. Half a season later he moved on again to TSG Neustrelitz, only to leave the club for fellow Regionalliga Nordost side 1. FC Magdeburg in July 2014. After winning the Regionalliga Nordost and promotion to the 3. Liga, Hebisch found it difficult to get playing time in the new tier and eventually saw his contract run out in June 2016. During the summer break, he joined Regionalliga Südwest side SV Waldhof Mannheim, signing a two-year contract until June 2018.

In July 2018, Hebisch joined FC Viktoria Köln. Hebisch made no appearances for the club due to injuries and joined VfB Lübeck in the following season on a two-year contract.

Hebisch joined Viktoria Aschaffenburg on 1 July 2021, signing a two-year contract with an option for an additional year. He made his debut for the club on 30 July, coming on as a substitute against SpVgg Greuther Fürth II in the Regionalliga Bayern.
