= Marius Sowislo =

Polish footballer

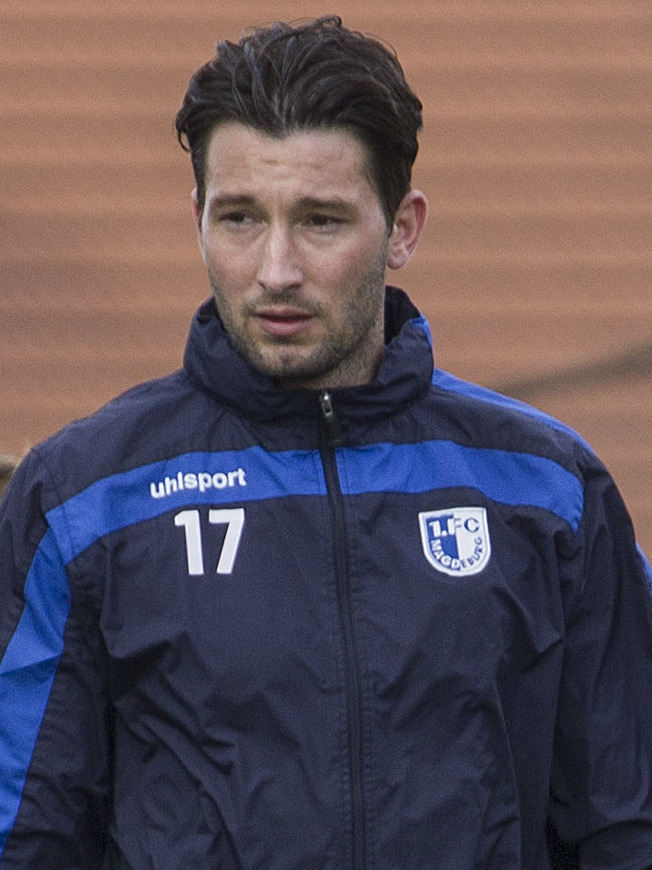
- Sowislo in 2016

Personal information
- Birth name: Mariusz Adrian Sowisło
- Date of birth: 14 November 1982 (age 43)
- Place of birth: Bytom, Poland
- Height: 1.88 m (6 ft 2 in)
- Position: Midfielder

Youth career
- VfL Bochum

Senior career*
Years	Team	Apps	(Gls)
–2004	DJK TuS Hordel		
2004–2006	Wuppertaler SV	31	(2)
2004–2006	Wuppertaler SV II	29	(11)
2006–2009	Preußen Münster	79	(23)
2009–2011	1. FC Kleve	46	(20)
2011–2012	Sportfreunde Siegen	18	(4)
2012–2018	1. FC Magdeburg	181	(28)
- * Club domestic league appearances and goals

Marius Sowislo (born Mariusz Adrian Sowisło; 14 November 1982) is a Polish former professional footballer who played as a midfielder.

== Career ==
Sowislo was born in Bytom in Poland, but spent most of his footballing career in Western Germany, starting with his youth club VfL Bochum.

He first played senior football for DJK TuS Hordel, before moving on to Wuppertaler SV. After spending a year in Wuppertal, Sowislo joined Preußen Münster where he played in 84 competitive matches, scoring 23 goals. He joined 1. FC Kleve after his stint with Preußen Münster, where he was reunited with manager Georg Kreß who he had worked under in Münster and Wuppertal. initially signing a one-year contract. In January 2011, Sowislo moved on to then fifth-tier side Sportfreunde Siegen, signing a contract until June 2012. However, his time at Siegen was marred by two injuries and he only played in 18 league matches and saw his contract not extended at the end of the 2011–12 season, when Siegen won promotion to the Regionalliga West.

Eventually, Sowislo joined 1. FC Magdeburg in July 2012, moving outside Western Germany for the first time, eventually becoming the side's captain. He led the team to promotion to the 3. Liga and into professional football for the first time since German reunification. He extended his contract until June 2016.

Sowislo retired from playing at the end of the 2017–18 season.

== Honours ==
1. FC Magdeburg

- 3. Liga: 2017–18
- Regionalliga Nordost: 2014–15
