= Silvio Bankert =

German footballer

Personal information
- Full name: Silvio Bankert
- Date of birth: 13 June 1985 (age 41)
- Place of birth: Luckenwalde, East Germany
- Height: 1.84 m (6 ft 0 in)
- Position: Right-back

Team information
- Current team: 1. FC Magdeburg (coach)

Youth career
- FSV Luckenwalde
- –2004: Energie Cottbus

Senior career*
Years	Team	Apps	(Gls)
2004–2008	Energie Cottbus II	143	(6)
2008–2010	1. FC Magdeburg	54	(0)
2010–2014	Chemnitzer FC	112	(6)
2014–2016	1. FC Magdeburg	36	(1)
- * Club domestic league appearances and goals as of 00:11, 13 May 2016 (UTC)

Silvio Bankert (born 13 June 1985 in Luckenwalde) is a German footballer who plays for 1. FC Magdeburg in the Regionalliga Nordost.

== Career ==
On 10 May 2016, Bankert decided to end his career on 30 June 2016, but will continue his work at Magdeburg as their coach in the youth department.
