= Niklas Brandt =

German footballer

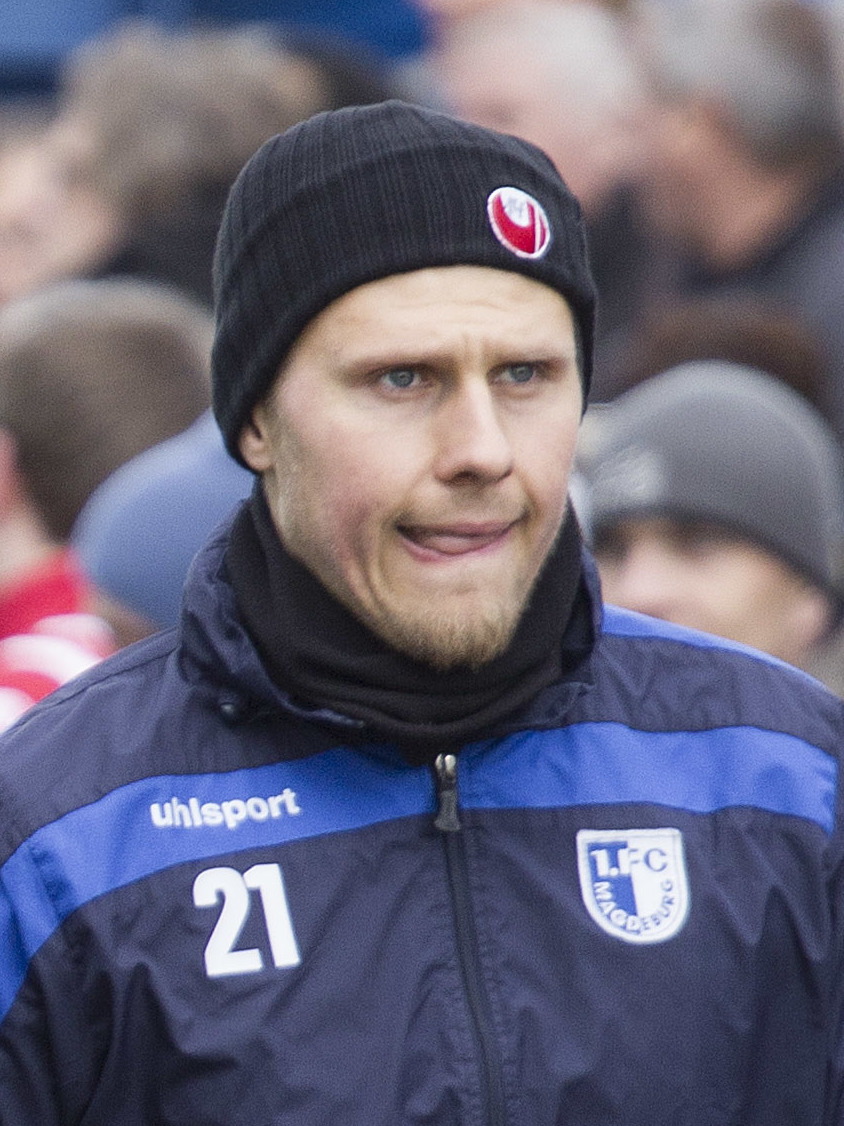
- Brandt in April 2016

Personal information
- Date of birth: 22 November 1991 (age 34)
- Place of birth: Berlin, Germany
- Height: 1.82 m (6 ft 0 in)
- Position: Defensive midfielder

Team information
- Current team: FSV Schöningen
- Number: 5

Youth career
- Nordberliner SC
- –2010: Hertha Zehlendorf

Senior career*
Years	Team	Apps	(Gls)
2010–2011	Reinickendorfer Füchse	11	(1)
2011–2013	Berliner AK	61	(8)
2013–2014	Hallescher FC II	5	(0)
2013–2014	Hallescher FC	15	(0)
2014–2017	1. FC Magdeburg	68	(3)
2017–2018	Viktoria Berlin	1	(0)
2018–2019	BFC Dynamo	28	(4)
2019–2020	Berliner AK	15	(2)
2020	Lokomotive Leipzig	5	(0)
2021–2023	BFC Dynamo	50	(5)
2023–2025	Greifswalder FC	55	(2)
2025–2026	BFC Preussen	32	(3)
2026–	FSV Schöningen	7	(1)
- * Club domestic league appearances and goals as of 22 September 2026

Niklas Brandt (born 22 November 1991) is a German footballer who plays as a defensive midfielder for FSV Schöningen.

== Career ==
On 11 May 2016, he extended his contract with 1. FC Magdeburg until 2017.
