= Nils Butzen =

German footballer

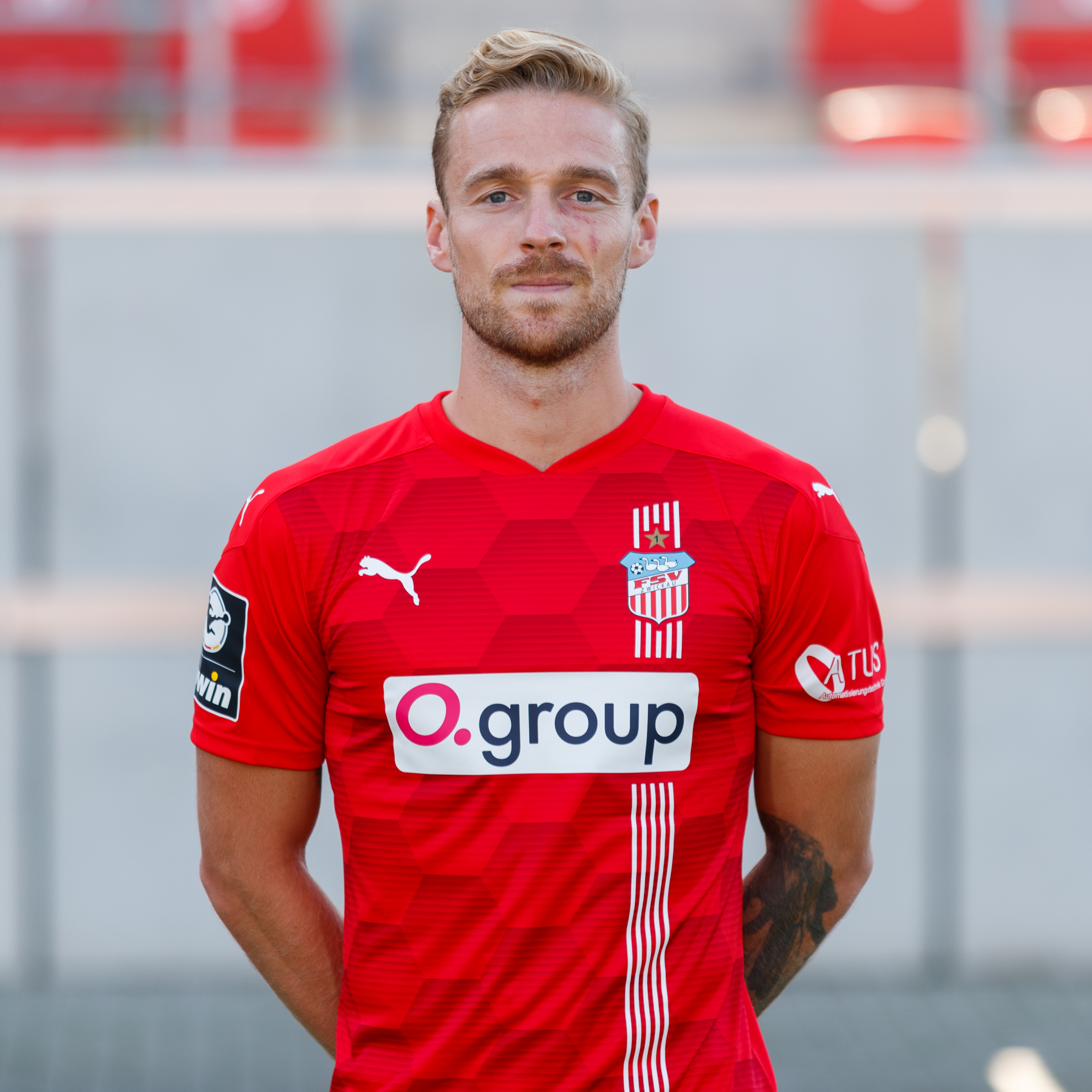
- Butzen in 2021

Personal information
- Date of birth: 2 April 1993 (age 33)
- Place of birth: Mühlhausen, Germany
- Height: 1.79 m (5 ft 10 in)
- Positions: Right back; right midfielder

Team information
- Current team: Carl Zeiss Jena
- Number: 26

Youth career
- –2009: FC Union Mühlhausen
- 2009–2011: 1. FC Magdeburg

Senior career*
Years	Team	Apps	(Gls)
2011	1. FC Magdeburg II	3	(0)
2011–2019	1. FC Magdeburg	176	(4)
2019–2021	Hansa Rostock	45	(1)
2021–2023	FSV Zwickau	55	(0)
2023–	Carl Zeiss Jena	104	(6)
- * Club domestic league appearances and goals as of 23 September 2026

Nils Butzen (born 2 April 1993) is a German professional footballer who plays as a right back or right midfielder for Carl Zeiss Jena.

== Career ==
Butzen was born in Mühlhausen in Thuringia. He started playing youth football at Union Mühlhausen before joining the youth department of 1. FC Magdeburg in 2009. He played three matches in the club's reserve team in the NOFV-Oberliga Süd in 2011, before becoming part of the first team squad for the 2011–12 season. He made his first team debut on 24 August 2011 in a Saxony-Anhalt Cup match, but had to wait until March next year for his league debut against Berliner AK. In the following years, Butzen established himself as a first team regular on the rightback position and saw his contract extended until June 2016 eventually.

Butzen played in 22 of 30 league matches in Magdeburg's successful 2014–15 campaign and scored his first two goals for the club against Carl Zeiss Jena in May. Following the club's promotion to Germany's 3. Liga, he made his professional debut as a rightback in Magdeburg's 2–1 victory over Rot-Weiß Erfurt in the season opener of the 2015–16 3. Liga season.

== Honours ==
=== Club ===
1. FC Magdeburg

- Regionalliga Nordost: 2015
- Dritte Liga: 2018
