= Lars Fuchs =

German footballer (born 1982)

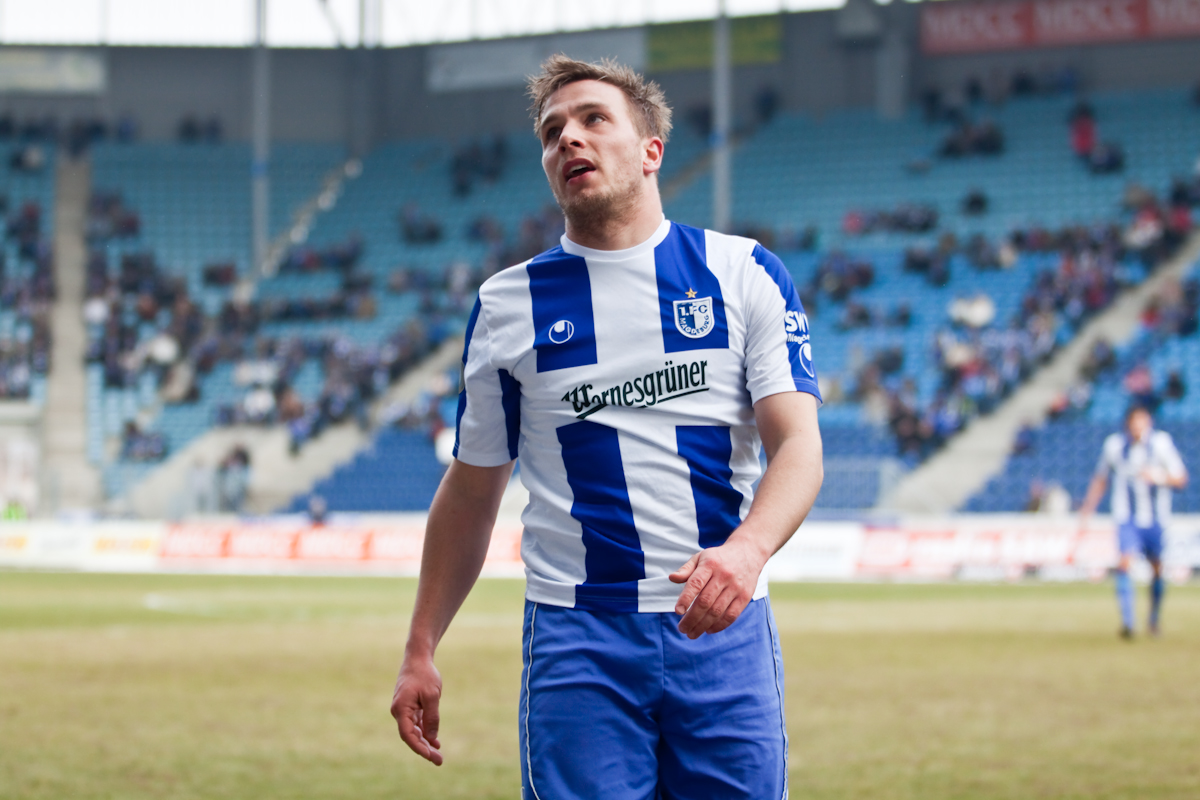

Personal information
- Full name: Lars Fuchs
- Date of birth: 21 June 1982 (age 44)
- Place of birth: Bad Harzburg, West Germany
- Height: 1.72 m (5 ft 8 in)
- Position: Forward

Youth career
- 1995–1999: FG 16 Vienenburg/Wiedelah
- 1999–2002: Eintracht Braunschweig

Senior career*
Years	Team	Apps	(Gls)
2002–2008	Eintracht Braunschweig	126	(21)
2002–2008	→ Eintracht Braunschweig II	37	(6)
2008	VfL Osnabrück	10	(2)
2009	FC Carl Zeiss Jena	12	(0)
2009	→ FC Carl Zeiss Jena II	2	(0)
2009–2010	1. FC Magdeburg	28	(16)
2010–2013	Hannover 96 II	88	(40)
2013–2016	1. FC Magdeburg	75	(26)

Managerial career
- 2016–2017: 1. FC Magdeburg U17 (assistant)
- 2017: 1. FC Magdeburg U17
- 2018–2020: Hannover 96 II (assistant)
- 2018-2020: Hannover 96 (youth)
- 2020–2021: Hannover 96 U17
- 2021–2022: Hannover 96 II
- 2023–2024: Greifswalder FC
- * Club domestic league appearances and goals

Lars Fuchs (born 21 June 1982) is a former German footballer who played as a forward. He was most recently the manager of Regionalliga Nordost club Greifswalder FC.

== Career ==
He began his career in 1995 in the youth team at his home town club, FG 16 Vienenburg/Wiedelah before he joined Eintracht Braunschweig in 1999. He played in 119 matches for Braunschweig, including 45 matches in the 2. Bundesliga.

In June 2008, Fuchs transferred to 2. Bundesliga side VfL Osnabrück and signed a contract until 2010. However, as he played no role in manager Claus-Dieter Wollitz's future plans, he joined FC Carl Zeiss Jena in January 2009, signing a contract until June 2011. When Fuchs found himself sidelined again, he dissolved the contract in the summer, and joined Regionalliga Nord side 1. FC Magdeburg. He played in 28 games for 1. FC Magdeburg and scored sixteen goals before he signed on 18 May 2010 a three-year contract for Hannover 96 II. After his contract with Hannover ran out, Fuchs returned to 1. FC Magdeburg for another spell, signing a one-year contract.

In 2023 he signed as head trainer of Regionalliga Nordost Team Greifswalder FC. On 8 October 2024, he left the club.
