= List of 1. FC Magdeburg players =

This list of 1. FC Magdeburg players names all football players that have played in at least one competitive match for the first team of 1. FC Magdeburg since its foundation on 22 December 1965. In addition, matches played for the predecessor teams of the club are included in the list. Players that still play for the club have a grey background.

As of 21 May 2018

- Player: States the player's name.
- Nation: The player's nationality. Players will be given a nationality based on today's geography, i.e. East German players will be classed as German, while former Soviet Union players will be given their current nationality (e.g. Ukrainian).
- from and to: Date on which the player played its first and last competitive match for the club. This does not account for matches played for other clubs in between.
- League games: Number of league matches played. This includes play-off matches in the 1990-91, 2000–01 and 2014–15 seasons.
- League goals: Number of goals scored in league matches.
- Cup games: Number of cup matches played. This includes all FDGB-Pokal matches, as well as those played in the DFB-Pokal and the Saxony-Anhalt Cup.
- Cup goals: Number of goals scored in cup matches.
- European games: Number of matches played in the European Cup, European Cup Winners' Cup and UEFA Cup. Magdeburg have played in three European Cup seasons, seven Cup Winner's Cup seasons and six UEFA Cup seasons. Altogether the club has played 72 European matches.
- European goals: Number of goals scored in European matches.

Player	Nation	Debut	Last match	League games	League goals	Cup games	Cup goals	European games	European goals
Wolfgang Abraham	Germany	27 May 1962	27 Aug 1975	222	57	35	17	17	1
Jürgen Achtel	Germany	3 Oct 1971	20 Feb 1974	47	0	10	0	6	0
Eric Agyemang	Ghana	4 Aug 2007	24 Mar 2008	18	0	5	2	0	0
Alexander Albrecht	Germany	13 Aug 1994	3 Mar 1996	38	1	2	0	0	0
Burak Altiparmak	Germany	11 Sep 2015	14 May 2016	24	1	4	0	0	0
Julian Austermann	Germany	19 Aug 2011	19 May 2012	13	0	2	0	0	0
Holger Bahra	Germany	1 Mar 1980	25 May 1983	21	0	0	0	1	0
Virginijus Baltušnikas	Lithuania	8 Aug 1993	18 May 1994	26	3	7	1	0	0
Silvio Bankert	Germany	16 Aug 2008	8 Apr 2016	90	1	13	2	0	0
Fait-Florian Banser	Germany	3 Nov 2002	22 May 2005	73	25	8	5	0	0
Uwe Bardick	Germany	8 Sep 1984	29 Mar 1986	2	0	0	0	0	0
Patrick Bärje	Germany	17 Feb 2012	15 Sep 2013	16	1	3	0	0	0
Patrick Bartsch	Germany	14 Mar 2010	26 Sep 2010	11	0	4	1	0	0
Daniel Bauer	Germany	21 Feb 2009	20 Nov 2011	63	5	11	2	0	0
Dirk Baumann	Germany	28 Sep 1991	5 Sep 1998	139	9	24	3	0	0
Steffen Baumgart	Germany	10 Feb 2008	31 May 2008	13	3	2	0	0	0
Matthias Baumgarten	Germany	11 Mar 1995	11 Mar 1995	1	0	0	0	0	0
Christian Beck	Germany	10 Feb 2013	still active	188	100	30	23	0	0
Normen Becker	Germany	12 Oct 1997	1 Jun 2003	16	0	6	0	0	0
Tobias Becker	Germany	8 Aug 2010	19 May 2012	65	5	7	3	0	0
Christian Beer	Germany	4 Sep 1999	7 Jun 2009	171	0	19	0	0	0
Florian Beil	Germany	12 Aug 2012	14 May 2014	44	9	10	13	0	0
Andre Beise	Germany	3 Aug 2003	16 May 2004	27	3	2	0	0	0
Marcello Bellomo	Germany	11 Aug 1999	12 Nov 1999	8	0	2	6	0	0
Heiko Bengs	Germany	4 Aug 2002	1 Jun 2003	31	0	6	1	0	0
Shergo Biran	Germany	5 Mar 2011	21 May 2011	10	0	1	0	0	0
Metin Birasoglu	Turkey	2 Aug 1992	13 Sep 1992	5	0	0	0	0	0
Wolfgang Blochwitz	Germany	19 Jun 1960	14 May 1966	110	0	14	0	9	0
Philipp Blume	Germany	8 Nov 2011	31 May 2013	18	0	4	1	0	0
Andreas Böhme	Germany	31 Aug 2002	31 Aug 2002	1	0	0	0	0	0
Benjamin Boltze	Germany	12 Aug 2012	19 May 2013	22	0	4	0	0	0
Heiko Bonan	Germany	17 Dec 1983	3 Jun 1989	119	14	17	1	1	0
Klaus Böttcher	Germany	2 Apr 1966	14 May 1966	4	0	0	0	0	0
Najeh Braham	Tunisia	10 Feb 2008	7 Jun 2009	45	18	8	6	0	0
Niklas Brandt	Germany	25 Jul 2014	25 May 2017	68	3	16	4	0	0
Hervé Brassart	France	14 Dec 2002	15 Aug 2003	12	1	2	1	0	0
Sven Torge Bremer	Germany	6 Sep 2013	13 Mar 2015	14	0	4	0	0	0
Marcel Brendel	Germany	29 Oct 2008	8 Sep 2012	16	1	3	1	0	0
Lothar Briebach	Germany	2 Nov 1968	16 Nov 1968	1	0	1	1	0	0
Manfred Briebach	Germany	17 Sep 1969	2 May 1970	3	0	0	0	1	0
Andreas Brinkmann	Germany	1 Dec 1979	24 Feb 1989	29	3	2	0	0	0
Alexander Brunst	Germany	7 Oct 2017	still active	5	0	3	0	0	0
Tobias Buchholz	Germany	20 May 2000	22 May 2005	2	0	0	0	0	0
Patrick Bücks	Germany	25 Oct 2003	14 Nov 2003	2	0	0	0	0	0
Dennis Buhro	Germany	6 Jun 1992	19 May 1993	9	0	1	0	0	0
Fabian Burdenski	Germany	14 Mar 2012	31 May 2013	34	0	1	0	0	0
Jan Burmeister	Germany	22 Mar 2002	23 May 2004	35	0	7	0	0	0
Hans-Dieter Busch	Germany	7 Aug 1960	5 Mar 1967	119	0	11	0	1	0
Nils Butzen	Germany	24 Aug 2011	still active	158	4	29	2	0	0
Frank Cebulla	Germany	20 Mar 1982	11 May 1996	228	32	25	8	6	0
Tarek Chahed	Germany	3 May 2015	still active	89	6	15	3	0	0
Ulf Ciechowski	Germany	27 Apr 1985	11 May 1985	2	0	0	0	0	0
Lukas Cichos	Germany	9 Aug 2015	still active	0	0	2	0	0	0
Marcel Costly	Germany	3 Feb 2018	still active	13	2	2	0	0	0
Gerald Cramer	Germany	19 Apr 1980	25 Feb 1984	61	1	7	0	9	0
Piotr Cwielong	Poland	3 Apr 2017	25 May 2017	5	1	2	0	0	0
Jan Daniec	Poland	21 Aug 1993	28 May 1995	51	15	8	2	0	0
Klaus Decker	Germany	22 Aug 1970	28 May 1983	278	7	51	2	40	0
Anatoliy Demyanenko	Ukraine	2 Mar 1991	4 May 1991	3	0	0	0	0	0
Igor Dennisjuk	Ukraine	5 Mar 1995	25 May 1997	65	16	7	5	0	0
Danilo Dersewski	Germany	8 Sep 2012	24 May 2014	3	0	1	0	0	0
Matthias Deumelandt	Germany	4 Sep 2005	19 May 2012	14	1	1	0	0	0
Klaus Dietrich	Austria	29 Jul 2001	18 May 2002	25	2	4	2	0	0
Reinhard Dietrich	Germany	25 Feb 1976	25 Feb 1976	0	0	1	0	0	0
Holger Döbbel	Germany	25 Mar 1978	27 Sep 1980	21	4	4	0	3	0
Rolf Döbbelin	Germany	4 May 1974	26 Jun 1988	131	7	13	4	10	0
Jörg Dobritz	Germany	19 Jul 1986	28 Sep 1991	33	0	3	0	2	0
Pavel Dobrý	Czech Republic	29 Jul 2001	18 May 2002	34	14	5	1	0	0
Jindrich Dohnal	Czech Republic	24 Jan 1999	20 May 2000	44	7	5	1	0	0
Axel Domine	Germany	15 Mar 1991	3 Mar 1996	99	24	17	6	0	0
Bernd Dorendorf	Germany	4 Oct 1975	30 May 1981	31	0	7	0	7	0
Mehmet Dragusha	Albania	16 Aug 2008	7 Jun 2009	27	2	2	0	0	0
Mike Drechsel	Germany	17 May 1997	13 Dec 1997	8	3	1	2	0	0
Miroslav Dreszer	Poland	1 Aug 1998	10 Apr 2002	119	0	21	1	0	0
Julius Düker	Germany	5 Aug 2016	1 Apr 2018	46	6	10	11	0	0
Nico Dürstel	Germany	22 Feb 1998	17 May 2003	32	3	3	0	0	0
Jürgen Ebeling	Germany	21 Feb 1976	22 Apr 1978	5	0	2	0	1	0
Manfred Eckardt	Germany	23 Nov 1957	4 May 1966	115	42	8	1	2	2
Florian Eggert	Germany	7 May 2006	7 May 2006	1	0	0	0	0	0
Andreas Egler	Germany	3 Aug 1996	11 Dec 1998	75	3	19	2	0	0
Timo Ehle	Germany	18 Mar 1989	6 Jun 1992	52	1	6	1	1	0
Hartmut Eichel	Germany	19 Sep 1970	19 Sep 1970	1	0	0	0	0	0
Detlef Enge	Germany	26 Nov 1969	23 Oct 1976	91	3	20	0	14	0
Sandy Enge	Germany	27 Aug 1988	3 May 1992	64	0	9	0	2	0
Dennis Erdmann	Germany	29 Jul 2017	still active	27	1	5	1	0	0
Necip Eren	Germany	10 May 2013	10 May 2013	1	0	0	0	0	0
Kurt Erler	Germany	13 Sep 1969	24 Sep 1969	3	0	0	0	1	0
Sebastian Ernst	Germany	24 Jan 2016	28 Jan 2017	26	4	7	6	0	0
Jörn Eschholz	Germany	27 Aug 2002	9 Apr 2003	9	0	2	2	0	0
Maurice Exslager	Germany	31 Jul 2016	10 Dec 2016	8	0	5	3	0	0
Fabian Falkenberg	Germany	22 May 2010	22 May 2010	1	1	0	0	0	0
Manuel Farrona-Pulido	Germany	24 Jul 2015	25 May 2017	54	7	6	5	0	0
Manfred Felke	Germany	23 Aug 1969	2 May 1970	6	1	0	0	0	0
Dirk Fengler	Germany	29 Jul 2001	15 Sep 2001	8	0	1	0	0	0
Emanuele Ferraro	Italy	11 Aug 1999	31 Oct 1999	7	0	3	3	0	0
Jaroslav Flisnik	Czech Republic	19 Sep 1990	15 Nov 1990	1	0	1	0	1	0
Franco Flückiger	Germany	28 May 2011	28 May 2011	1	0	0	0	0	0
Flavio Moreira Fontura	Brazil	20 Aug 1999	31 Oct 1999	7	1	3	2	0	0
Maik Franz	Germany	22 Apr 2000	9 Jun 2001	29	3	7	0	0	0
Tobias Friebertshäuser	Germany	10 Feb 2007	6 Apr 2014	85	9	16	2	0	0
Günter Fronzeck	Germany	11 Aug 1963	31 May 1972	163	7	28	1	10	0
Dennis Fuchs	Germany	13 Aug 1994	9 May 2000	137	27	17	6	0	0
Lars Fuchs	Germany	25 Aug 2009	26 Mar 2016	103	42	20	13	0	0
Andreas Gaebler	Germany	1 Aug 2009	29 May 2010	24	0	5	0	0	0
Hendrik Gallien	Germany	2 May 2010	14 Aug 2010	2	0	1	0	0	0
Helmut Gaube	Germany	12 Mar 1969	6 Oct 1974	38	1	3	0	2	0
Maik Georgi	Germany	15 Mar 2009	9 Dec 2011	53	3	7	1	0	0
Enrico Gerlach	Germany	13 Aug 1994	4 Jun 1995	27	1	1	0	0	0
Jens Gerlach	Germany	22 Oct 1988	25 May 1991	50	3	6	0	4	0
Frank Gerster	Germany	5 Aug 2006	31 May 2008	68	6	6	1	0	0
Maximilian Gerwien	Germany	9 May 2010	9 May 2010	1	0	0	0	0	0
Reinhard Geschke	Germany	22 Aug 1965	5 Oct 1968	21	3	2	0	1	0
René Gewelke	Germany	16 Aug 2008	22 May 2010	32	1	4	0	0	0
Tim Girke	Germany	14 Apr 2010	14 Apr 2010	1	0	0	0	0	0
Philipp Glage	Germany	28 Mar 2010	28 Mar 2010	1	0	0	0	0	0
Jan Glinker	Germany	25 Jul 2014	7 Apr 2018	104	0	6	0	0	0
Andreas Golombek	Germany	20 Nov 1999	14 Dec 2001	44	7	12	5	0	0
Adriano Bicalho Gomes	Brazil	24 Aug 2011	4 Dec 2011	4	0	3	2	0	0
Manolo Gomez	Spain	18 Apr 1999	8 May 1999	2	2	0	0	0	0
Uwe Grafe	Germany	28 Sep 1997	5 Oct 1997	1	0	1	0	0	0
Dirk Grempler	Germany	23 Feb 1990	11 May 1994	102	15	17	6	2	0
Andreas Griep	Germany	8 Feb 2004	22 May 2005	7	0	0	0	0	0
Andreas Griffel	Germany	19 Oct 1996	25 May 1997	13	1	4	0	0	0
Alexander Gröger	Germany	20 May 2000	20 May 2000	1	0	0	0	0	0
Hendrik Großöhmichen	Germany	23 Feb 2010	20 Mar 2010	2	0	0	0	0	0
Pit Grundmann	Germany	3 Aug 2003	13 Sep 2008	106	15	10	1	0	0
Uwe Grüning	Germany	8 Jun 1974	1 Dec 1979	19	1	5	0	1	0
Michael Habryka	Germany	19 Mar 2006	31 May 2008	65	2	7	0	0	0
Peter Hackenberg	Germany	24 Aug 2011	4 May 2013	39	1	5	1	0	0
Sebastian Hähnge	Germany	4 Apr 1996	5 Dec 1999	86	13	17	12	0	0
André Hainault	Canada	16 Aug 2015	12 May 2018	33	2	6	1	0	0
Damian Halata	Germany	1 Mar 1980	2 Jul 1988	193	47	25	13	10	0
Daniel Halke	Germany	8 Aug 2010	12 May 2012	47	0	4	0	0	0
Nico Hammann	Germany	3 Aug 2013	still active	140	25	22	7	0	0
Christopher Handke	Germany	3 Aug 2013	still active	139	3	16	2	0	0
Dirk Hannemann	Germany	1 Aug 1998	18 May 2002	106	13	14	5	0	0
Philipp Harant	Germany	2 Sep 2017	still active	0	0	2	0	0	0
Michél Harrer	Germany	2 Sep 2012	10 May 2013	13	0	2	1	0	0
Nicolas Hebisch	Germany	25 Jul 2014	18 May 2016	48	10	10	7	0	0
Marc Heidler	Germany	6 Oct 1991	14 Mar 1993	16	0	3	0	0	0
Hans-Werner Heine	Germany	5 Feb 1972	1 Oct 1975	10	0	5	0	2	0
Jens Heineccius	Germany	13 Apr 1985	13 Apr 1985	1	0	0	0	0	0
Dietmar Hempel	Germany	24 May 1972	16 Oct 1976	5	0	4	2	0	0
Patrick Henkel	Germany	14 Aug 2011	15 Apr 2012	24	0	3	0	0	0
Hans-Jürgen Hermann	Germany	6 Sep 1969	7 May 1975	114	27	24	6	16	2
Ingo Hermanns	Germany	18 Mar 1989	25 Mar 1989	2	0	0	0	0	0
Christof Hetmanski	Poland	15 Nov 1997	19 Aug 2000	55	0	6	0	0	0
Peter Heuer	Germany	18 Aug 1963	8 Apr 1966	16	4	2	1	4	2
Dirk Heyne	Germany	13 Aug 1977	23 Jun 1991	323	0	51	0	34	0
Leon Heynke	Germany	10 Jul 2017	still active	0	0	1	0	0	0
Günter Hirschmann	Germany	31 Jul 1955	2 Apr 1969	300	113	25	11	5	0
Horst-Werner Höfeker	Germany	24 May 1972	25 Nov 1972	1	0	1	0	0	0
Maik Hoffmann	Germany	5 Nov 1994	27 Sep 1996	21	0	1	0	0	0
Martin Hoffmann	Germany	31 May 1972	19 Oct 1985	256	78	41	12	43	13
Sören Holz	Germany	11 Aug 2000	18 May 2002	54	3	12	0	0	0
Benjamin Holze	Germany	4 Aug 2002	1 Jun 2003	25	2	4	0	0	0
Otto Hoppe	Germany	14 Aug 1966	2 Oct 1966	7	0	1	0	0	0
Carsten Horn	Germany	31 Oct 2002	8 Dec 2002	3	0	1	0	0	0
Mohama-Tassiou Idrissou	Togo	4 Dec 1994	11 Dec 1994	2	2	0	0	0	0
Moritz Instenberg	Germany	2 Sep 2009	12 May 2012	34	0	4	0	0	0
Josef Ivanovic	Germany	29 Jan 2001	9 Jun 2001	39	28	10	3	0	0
Robert Jadczak	Poland	11 Mar 1995	5 May 1996	32	2	1	0	0	0
Fabian Jahnel	Germany	28 Apr 2010	28 Apr 2010	1	0	0	0	0	0
Uwe Jähnig	Germany	2 Mar 1991	25 May 1991	13	1	0	0	0	0
Ivica Jarakovic	Serbia; Belgium	5 Sep 2007	31 May 2008	19	4	4	1	0	0
Velimir Jovanovic	Serbia; Germany	7 Mar 2012	15 Apr 2012	8	0	0	0	0	0
Gert Jüsgen	Germany	4 Nov 1967	4 May 1968	13	0	1	0	0	0
Christopher Kalkutschke	Germany	12 May 2012	12 May 2012	1	0	0	0	0	0
Florian Kath	Germany	31 Jul 2016	20 May 2017	19	3	2	1	0	0
Mario Kallnik	Germany	29 Jul 2001	14 May 2008	206	27	28	4	0	0
Asterios Karagiannis	Greece	24 Aug 2011	9 Oct 2011	0	0	3	0	0	0
Dirk Ketzer	Germany	22 May 1982	22 Sep 1984	1	0	1	0	0	0
David Kinsombi	Germany; DR Congo	13 Feb 2016	14 May 2016	11	0	1	0	0	0
Uwe Kirchner	Germany	24 Aug 1985	16 Jul 1988	56	5	5	1	2	0
Igoris Kirilovas	Lithuania	8 Aug 1993	26 Feb 1994	14	0	1	0	0	0
Wladyslaw Klak	Poland	18 Jan 1992	15 Apr 1992	4	0	1	1	0	0
Ralf Kleiminger	Germany	17 Aug 1985	12 Oct 1985	2	0	1	0	0	0
Wilfried Klingbiel	Germany	9 Aug 1964	16 Apr 1966	40	0	10	7	7	1
Markus Klivinyi	Germany	6 Jun 1992	22 Apr 1993	4	0	1	0	0	0
Thomas Kluge	Germany	26 Jun 1988	10 May 1989	15	1	0	0	0	0
Burkhard Knobbe	Germany	6 Oct 1984	1 Aug 1987	13	0	0	0	0	0
Waldemar Koc	Poland	1 Aug 1998	18 May 2002	76	1	13	2	0	0
Peter Kohde	Germany	31 May 1972	21 Apr 1979	19	0	6	0	5	0
Jan Köhler	Germany	24 May 1989	19 Apr 1998	71	4	9	0	0	0
Peter Köhler	Germany	23 Mar 1985	5 Jun 1993	153	30	23	6	5	0
Thorsten Kohn	Germany	8 Aug 1993	18 May 1994	29	8	8	3	0	0
Christof Köhne	Germany	9 Oct 2010	19 May 2012	35	3	5	0	0	0
Maik Koschwitz	Germany	30 Apr 2011	31 May 2013	12	3	3	0	0	0
Aleksandar Kotuljac	Germany	7 Aug 2005	2 Jun 2007	38	20	5	3	0	0
Guido Krause	Germany	18 Sep 1982	22 Sep 1991	37	3	5	1	0	0
Timm Kreibich	Germany	2 Sep 1998	21 May 2006	121	26	21	6	0	0
Jörg Kretzschmar	Germany	1 Feb 1997	20 May 2000	98	11	18	7	0	0
Dawid Krieger	Poland	6 Aug 2011	25 May 2013	57	9	9	15	0	0
Kevin Kruschke	Germany	25 Jul 2014	27 Apr 2016	31	1	8	4	0	0
Andreas Kruse	Germany	28 Oct 1989	9 Dec 1989	2	0	1	0	0	0
Sven Kubis	Germany	7 Aug 2005	2 Jun 2007	53	20	7	3	0	0
Günter Kubisch	Germany	29 Jun 1957	12 Jun 1971	326	18	29	3	13	3
Kai Kühne	Germany	4 Aug 2002	14 May 2005	85	17	11	3	0	0
Danny Kukulies	Germany	5 Aug 2006	8 Dec 2007	30	5	3	0	0	0
Michael Kullat	Germany	4 Aug 2002	9 Apr 2003	22	4	4	0	0	0
Christopher Kullmann	Germany	21 Nov 2004	31 May 2008	86	16	10	3	0	0
Tobias Kurbjuweit	Germany	6 Aug 2004	13 Apr 2005	29	12	3	2	0	0
Marco Kurth	Germany	7 Mar 2012	3 Aug 2013	32	0	8	0	0	0
Heiko Laeßig	Germany	25 Jul 1987	15 Jun 1991	59	17	8	4	4	1
Jens Landrath	Germany	9 May 1987	5 Jun 1993	101	11	14	1	3	0
Marco Lange	Germany	26 Aug 1989	25 Nov 1989	1	0	1	0	0	0
René Lange	Germany	3 Aug 2013	23 May 2015	41	2	11	2	0	0
Charles Elie Laprevotte	France	18 Feb 2017	still active	15	1	6	0	0	0
Mario Lau	Germany	25 Jul 1997	15 May 1999	59	14	8	8	0	0
Fernando Lenk	Germany	6 Aug 2011	31 May 2013	38	0	4	0	0	0
Christian Lenze	Germany	6 Aug 1995	25 Oct 1998	61	7	13	10	0	0
Timo Lesch	Germany	11 Aug 1999	12 Nov 1999	7	0	1	1	0	0
Birger Lestin	Germany	18 Jun 1991	6 Jun 1992	13	0	1	0	0	0
Matthias Lichter	Germany	5 Feb 1995	14 May 1995	4	0	0	0	0	0
Frank Lieberam	Germany	17 Oct 1981	5 Apr 1998	70	9	17	8	0	0
Björn Lindemann	Germany	10 Feb 2007	31 May 2008	44	9	6	0	0	0
Robert Littmann	Germany	1 Aug 2009	13 Dec 2009	8	0	3	0	0	0
Mirko Löffler	Germany	27 Aug 1994	18 Feb 1995	7	0	0	0	0	0
Felix Lohkemper	Germany	23 Jul 2017	still active	17	5	4	4	0	0
Jan Löhmannsröben	Germany	24 Jul 2015	13 May 2017	62	3	7	2	0	0
Dirk Losert	Germany	5 Jul 1986	28 May 1988	37	1	3	0	0	0
Robert Löw	Germany	22 May 2010	22 May 2010	1	0	0	0	0	0
Andreas Lücke	Germany	29 May 1998	31 Mar 2002	57	2	15	4	0	0
Andreas Ludwig	Germany	23 Jul 2017	24 Feb 2018	10	1	3	3	0	0
Niels Mackel	Germany	9 Dec 1989	18 May 1994	88	32	17	7	0	0
Ryan Malone	United States	15 Sep 2015	18 May 2016	9	2	3	2	0	0
Marcel Maltritz	Germany	8 Apr 1996	11 Dec 1998	72	16	15	4	0	0
Kais Manai	Germany; Tunisia	5 Aug 2006	10 May 2008	42	5	5	0	0	0
Petr Mašlej	Czech Republic	11 Aug 1999	12 May 2002	83	25	11	4	0	0
Pascal Matthias	Germany	16 Aug 2008	29 May 2010	33	0	5	2	0	0
Wolfgang Matthies	Germany	17 Sep 1983	1 Dec 1984	15	0	4	0	0	0
Aka-Adeck Mba	Cameroon	4 Aug 2001	10 Apr 2002	16	0	3	1	0	0
Jan Mehlfeld	Germany	13 Aug 1994	27 May 1996	26	2	1	0	0	0
Stefan Mensch	Germany	6 Aug 2004	3 May 2006	42	1	3	0	0	0
Mark Mewes	Germany	5 Nov 1995	28 Nov 1998	35	0	12	0	0	0
Siegmund Mewes	Germany	7 Mar 1971	1 Jun 1985	296	56	50	13	40	6
Stefan Minkwitz	Germany	7 Nov 1987	31 May 1992	110	12	11	4	3	0
Guido Mischok	Germany	18 Jan 1992	29 Apr 1998	116	0	16	0	0	0
Nikolai Mitov	Bulgaria	16 Feb 1997	27 Apr 1997	10	2	2	0	0	0
Hans-Georg Moldenhauer	Germany	2 Jul 1960	2 Jun 1971	134	0	16	0	2	0
Ali Moslehe	Lebanon	12 Aug 2012	1 Dec 2012	12	1	3	1	0	0
Andy Müller	Germany	14 Apr 2004	1 Dec 2007	83	10	9	1	0	0
Bert Müller	Germany	15 May 1982	1 Jun 1985	3	1	0	0	0	0
Carsten Müller	Germany	28 Oct 1989	18 May 1994	68	0	15	0	0	0
Florian Müller	Germany	4 Aug 2007	31 May 2008	36	2	5	0	0	0
Gerrit Müller	Germany	5 Aug 2016	21 Oct 2017	12	0	5	3	0	0
Rainer Müller	Germany	8 Aug 2010	6 May 2011	21	0	3	1	0	0
Steve Müller	Germany	2 Mar 2003	22 May 2005	62	1	6	2	0	0
David Mydlo	Czech Republic	14 Aug 1998	9 Jun 2001	82	30	16	11	0	0
Andreas Narr	Germany	25 Jul 1987	26 Oct 1996	45	0	4	0	0	0
Rüdiger Naumann	Germany	22 May 1982	30 May 1982	2	0	0	0	0	0
Rene N'Dombasi	DR Congo	28 Feb 2004	23 Apr 2006	50	13	4	3	0	0
Aleksandr Nechyporuk	Ukraine	7 Aug 2005	28 May 2006	20	1	5	1	0	0
Kevin Nennhuber	Germany	10 Feb 2013	24 May 2014	37	4	7	1	0	0
Stephan Neumann	Germany	9 Dec 2000	31 May 2013	285	7	37	2	0	0
Nico Niedziella	Germany	21 May 1988	28 May 1988	2	0	0	0	0	0
Michel Niemeyer	Germany	24 Jul 2015	still active	58	9	6	0	0	0
Novy Lukas	Czech Republic	8 May 2016	19 Nov 2016	1	0	2	0	0	0
Heinz Oelze	Germany	16 Nov 1968	18 Oct 1975	69	9	13	3	4	0
Adolphus Ofodile	Nigeria	14 Aug 1999	9 Jun 2001	51	22	10	7	0	0
Jörg Ohm	Germany	30 Jun 1968	21 Dec 1974	78	1	16	2	5	0
Werner Okupniak	Germany	26 Dec 1967	27 Apr 1968	1	0	1	0	0	0
Patrick Ortlieb	Germany	24 Jan 1998	15 May 1999	42	4	7	1	0	0
Peter Otte	Germany	3 Aug 2003	17 May 2008	111	1	12	0	0	0
Jens Pahlke	Germany	25 Apr 1981	25 Apr 1981	1	0	0	0	0	0
Vlado Papic	Croatia	29 Jan 2000	18 May 2002	75	35	13	9	0	0
Christian Person	Germany	3 Oct 2004	22 May 2005	18	0	2	0	0	0
Lars Philipp	Germany	13 Aug 1994	24 Sep 1995	25	1	1	0	0	0
Florian Pick	Germany	6 Aug 2017	21 May 2018	3	0	3	2	0	0
Stephan Pientak	Germany	7 Aug 2005	2 Jun 2007	51	5	7	0	0	0
Frank Pietruska	Germany	27 May 1989	18 May 1994	30	0	6	0	0	0
Steffen Plock	Germany	6 Aug 2004	28 May 2006	41	7	6	0	0	0
Patryk Podrygala	Germany; Poland	17 Aug 2012	17 Aug 2012	0	0	0	1	0	0
Peter Pohlmann	Germany	2 Aug 1992	18 May 1994	69	2	9	1	0	0
Jürgen Pommerenke	Germany	26 Sep 1970	15 Sep 1984	301	82	55	17	48	14
Christian Prest	Germany	15 May 1999	2 May 2010	185	11	32	3	0	0
Marcel Probst	Germany	4 Aug 2002	11 Apr 2010	186	6	23	3	0	0
Sebastian Prosovsky	Germany	5 May 1998	1 Jun 2003	18	2	3	0	0	0
Steffen Puttkammer	Germany	3 Aug 2013	25 May 2017	102	11	20	0	0	0
Norbert Pysall	Germany	13 Sep 1972	5 Apr 1975	22	4	6	1	2	0
Abiodum Quadri	Nigeria	5 Aug 2000	22 Apr 2001	9	0	5	1	0	0
Catalin Racanel	Romania	16 Aug 2008	25 Apr 2010	60	5	11	6	0	0
Olaf Rakus	Germany	14 Mar 1981	7 Apr 1984	5	0	0	0	0	0
Markus Rasche	Germany	22 Sep 2001	18 May 2002	17	1	3	0	0	0
Detlef Raugust	Germany	14 Oct 1972	9 May 1986	226	5	37	2	41	0
Manfred Rautenberg	Germany	8 Apr 1966	25 May 1968	8	0	0	0	0	0
Ahmed Waseem Razeek	Germany	24 Jul 2015	13 May 2017	36	4	9	1	0	0
Christian Reimann	Germany	10 Feb 2008	22 May 2009	40	3	4	2	0	0
Sven Reimann	Germany	25 Jul 2014	28 Nov 2015	22	1	8	1	0	0
Christopher Reinhard	Germany	12 Aug 2012	9 Jun 2014	45	7	11	1	0	0
Sven Reinke	Germany	14 Aug 1993	26 Mar 1994	18	0	4	1	0	0
Rolf Retschlag	Germany	17 Sep 1961	10 Jun 1972	182	1	22	0	10	0
Denny Richter	Germany	13 Mar 1994	27 May 1996	52	11	2	0	0	0
Thomas Richter	Germany	5 Mar 2000	20 May 2000	13	0	0	0	0	0
Kosta Rodrigues	Germany	5 Feb 2010	29 Apr 2012	30	0	6	0	0	0
Ronny Röper	Germany	24 Jan 1999	14 Apr 2000	17	4	4	0	0	0
Daniel Rosin	Germany	16 Aug 2008	7 Jun 2009	32	1	4	0	0	0
Uwe Rösler	Germany	25 Mar 1989	1 Dec 1990	46	19	5	1	4	0
Dirk Roswandowicz	Germany	10 Sep 1995	21 Apr 1996	14	1	0	0	0	0
Daniel Rothe	Germany	30 Sep 2005	7 Dec 2006	14	0	4	0	0	0
Björn Rother	Germany	23 Jul 2017	still active	32	2	3	0	0	0
Reinhard Rother	Germany	31 Mar 1984	24 Apr 1994	133	31	24	12	1	0
Marcel Rozgonyi	Germany	5 Aug 2000	2 Jun 2001	31	0	9	0	0	0
Thomas Rudolph	Germany	12 Apr 1980	30 Apr 1980	4	0	0	0	0	0
Ingolf Ruhloff	Germany	31 Oct 1964	25 May 1968	27	1	5	0	2	0
Philip Saalbach	Germany	11 Aug 2010	21 May 2011	13	0	4	0	0	0
Jan Sandmann	Germany	24 Aug 1996	26 Apr 2000	102	13	18	0	0	0
Bernd Sandrock	Germany	22 Nov 1975	18 Mar 1978	12	0	7	0	3	0
Steffen Schäfer	Germany	23 Jul 2017	still active	28	0	5	0	0	0
Tobias Scharlau	Germany	3 Oct 2010	4 Mar 2012	30	2	3	0	0	0
Felix Schiller	Germany	3 Oct 2012	5 May 2018	94	7	15	0	0	0
Erik Schlieb	Germany	10 Sep 1994	10 Sep 1994	1	0	0	0	0	0
Marcel Schlosser	Germany	25 Jul 2014	24 Jul 2015	24	0	6	0	0	0
Andre Schmeißer	Germany	2 Feb 2003	21 Nov 2003	26	0	4	0	0	0
Bodo Schmidt	Germany	5 Dec 1998	18 May 2002	104	10	14	0	0	0
Rajko Schmuck	Germany	13 Sep 1992	22 Apr 1993	8	1	2	2	0	0
Tino Schmunck	Germany	3 Aug 2013	24 May 2014	27	1	6	2	0	0
René Schneider	Germany	26 May 1990	5 Jun 1993	57	4	9	1	4	0
Hannes Schock	Germany	22 May 2010	22 May 2010	1	0	0	0	0	0
Ronny Scholze	Germany	22 Nov 1998	16 Mar 2002	29	3	9	3	0	0
Tino Schönberg	Germany	22 Feb 2004	22 Feb 2004	1	0	0	0	0	0
Detlef Schößler	Germany	14 Mar 1981	10 May 1989	169	8	25	1	6	0
Morris Schröter	Germany	3 Aug 2013	26 Apr 2015	22	2	5	6	0	0
Dieter Schüler	Germany	26 Feb 1966	23 Mar 1966	4	1	2	0	0	0
Stephan Schulz	Germany	4 Aug 2002	6 Apr 2004	40	3	7	3	0	0
Christian Schulze	Germany	10 Sep 1994	31 Oct 1995	5	0	1	0	0	0
Jörg Schulze	Germany	26 Aug 1989	21 Apr 1996	6	1	1	0	0	0
Ulrich Schulze	Germany	27 Jul 1968	21 Apr 1976	138	0	22	0	16	0
Benjamin Schüßler	Germany	29 Jan 2000	20 May 2000	14	1	2	0	0	0
Dirk Schuster	Germany	12 Mar 1988	18 May 1990	52	1	5	0	0	0
Tobias Schwede	Germany	5 Aug 2016	13 Apr 2018	59	8	5	2	0	0
Lutz Schwerinski	Germany	11 Aug 1990	6 Jun 1992	58	28	6	5	3	0
Reinhard Segger	Germany	11 Oct 1964	1 Jun 1968	25	6	4	1	3	0
Wolfgang Seguin	Germany	9 Feb 1964	25 Apr 1981	403	48	69	11	57	5
Mario Seidel	Germany	2 Sep 2017	still active	1	0	4	0	0	0
Eren Şen	Germany	19 Sep 2010	3 Nov 2010	7	1	0	0	0	0
Christoph Siefkes	Germany	22 Feb 2014	23 May 2015	23	0	6	1	0	0
Alexander Siemke	Germany	10 Aug 2003	23 May 2004	18	1	3	0	0	0
Frank Siersleben	Germany	25 Aug 1979	18 May 1994	299	11	42	2	6	0
Deniz Sığa	Turkey	24 Aug 2008	2 May 2010	26	3	3	1	0	0
Bodo Sommer	Germany	13 Dec 1970	21 May 1977	45	1	6	0	2	0
Andreas Sommermeyer	Germany	5 Oct 2003	6 Nov 2005	25	2	4	0	0	0
Marius Sowislo	Poland	12 Aug 2012	21 May 2018	181	26	33	12	0	0
Jürgen Sparwasser	Germany	26 Feb 1966	9 Jun 1979	298	133	49	20	39	20
Moritz Sprenger	Germany	21 Aug 2016	18 Feb 2017	12	0	2	0	0	0
Dirk Stahmann	Germany	25 Mar 1978	1 May 1994	328	47	42	9	21	2
Henning Stary	Germany	15 May 1999	7 Dec 2003	38	0	6	0	0	0
Roman Št'ástka	Czech Republic	24 Jan 1999	19 Sep 1999	19	1	0	0	0	0
Sven Stauch	Germany	15 Sep 2002	21 Sep 2002	2	0	0	0	0	0
Wolfgang Steinbach	Germany	21 Nov 1971	26 May 1990	337	75	58	14	38	8
Heinz Steinborn	Germany	12 Aug 1967	4 Oct 1970	55	1	4	0	0	0
Matthias Steinborn	Germany	23 Nov 2013	23 May 2015	25	0	8	0	0	0
Manuel Stiefel	Germany	8 Aug 2010	6 May 2011	19	3	3	2	0	0
Mirko Stieler	Germany	19 Sep 1992	1 May 1996	85	18	11	2	0	0
Daniel Stingl	Germany	14 Aug 1999	16 Oct 1999	3	0	2	0	0	0
Hermann Stöcker	Germany	8 Jan 1956	31 May 1969	298	68	27	6	8	2
Stefan Strauß	Germany	29 Jul 2001	4 Nov 2001	8	0	0	0	0	0
Joachim Streich	Germany	23 Aug 1975	1 Jun 1985	237	171	38	27	38	18
Sebastian Sumelka	Germany	8 Aug 2010	15 May 2011	22	0	2	0	0	0
Peter Sykora	Germany	27 Jul 1968	30 May 1970	39	2	9	1	3	0
Telmo Teixeira-Rebelo	Germany; Portugal	10 Feb 2013	24 May 2014	24	2	5	2	0	0
René Thierau	Germany	13 Aug 1994	30 May 1998	79	3	11	1	0	0
Heiner Thomas	Germany	16 Sep 1978	11 Dec 1982	16	1	5	1	2	0
Matthias Tischer	Germany	22 May 2005	14 May 2016	177	0	25	0	0	0
Dennis Tornieporth	Germany	4 Aug 2007	4 Nov 2007	13	1	3	0	0	0
Philip Türpitz	Germany	23 Jul 2017	still active	34	17	5	0	0	0
Simon Tüting	Germany	1 Aug 2009	29 May 2010	32	2	5	2	0	0
Axel Tyll	Germany	16 Jun 1971	22 May 1982	233	32	44	6	40	3
Christian Uffrecht	Germany	11 Aug 2002	22 May 2005	43	0	7	0	0	0
Daniel Ujazdowski	Germany	23 Feb 2010	10 Apr 2011	12	0	1	0	0	0
Dirk Ulrich	Germany	18 May 1974	21 May 1977	10	0	0	0	1	0
Jörg Ulrich	Germany	22 Oct 1988	22 Oct 1988	1	0	0	0	0	0
Marian Unger	Germany	3 Oct 2007	14 May 2008	4	0	4	0	0	0
Leo Uzoma	Nigeria	29 Jul 2001	10 Apr 2002	12	1	4	1	0	0
Radoslaw Vadarov	Bulgaria	13 Dec 1997	9 May 1998	13	1	2	2	0	0
Marko Verkic	Croatia	1 Aug 2009	15 May 2010	38	8	9	4	0	0
Fabio Viteritti	Germany	6 Aug 2011	11 May 2014	72	4	15	5	0	0
Matthias von der Weth	Germany	5 Aug 2006	10 Nov 2007	29	2	5	1	0	0
Eddy Vorm	Netherlands	8 Aug 2010	28 Nov 2010	12	1	3	1	0	0
Radovan Vujanovic	Serbia	16 Aug 2008	29 May 2010	63	35	10	5	0	0
Joachim Walter	Germany	20 Mar 1960	30 May 1970	241	71	25	11	12	3
Maximilian Watzka	Germany	16 Aug 2008	9 May 2010	62	14	11	2	0	0
Mario Wedde	Germany	1 Feb 1997	1 Feb 1997	0	0	1	0	0	0
Richard Weil	Germany	5 Feb 2017	still active	41	5	4	0	0	0
Frank Weis	Germany	9 Nov 1985	14 Dec 1985	4	0	1	0	0	0
Matthias Weiß	Germany	1 Sep 1990	28 Sep 1990	4	0	2	0	0	0
Mats Wejsfelt	Sweden	19 Aug 2006	8 Mar 2009	74	3	10	1	0	0
Ingo Weniger	Germany	30 Apr 1977	30 Apr 1977	1	0	0	0	0	0
Peter Westendorf	Germany	8 Aug 1993	18 May 1994	25	5	7	1	0	0
Reiner Wiedemann	Germany	10 Aug 1958	27 Nov 1966	198	30	23	2	9	2
Marvin Wijks	Netherlands	8 Aug 2010	28 May 2011	28	1	2	0	0	0
Andreas Wilke	Germany	4 Aug 2002	1 Jun 2003	15	1	4	0	0	0
Frank Windelband	Germany	18 Aug 1979	26 Mar 1988	129	11	21	4	7	2
Andreas Winkler	Germany	29 Jan 2000	20 May 2000	17	3	2	0	0	0
Carsten Wittiber	Germany	3 Sep 1988	12 Oct 1988	5	0	2	1	0	0
Axel Wittke	Germany	14 Oct 1978	16 Jul 1988	149	13	21	3	4	0
Jens Wittke	Germany	27 Feb 1985	22 Mar 1986	1	0	2	0	0	0
Benny Woitha	Germany	4 Aug 2002	14 May 2005	83	4	10	2	0	0
Andrzej Wojcik	Poland	8 Apr 1995	18 Feb 2000	147	9	20	3	0	0
Denis Wolf	Philippines	14 Feb 2010	19 May 2012	68	12	9	3	0	0
Christopher Wright	United States	6 Aug 2011	19 May 2012	30	6	4	2	0	0
Markus Wuckel	Germany	17 Aug 1985	6 Apr 1991	116	47	12	9	2	0
Martin Zander	Germany	22 Sep 2007	29 May 2010	54	3	11	1	0	0
Armando Zani	Albania	5 Aug 2000	18 May 2002	60	23	15	10	0	0
Manfred Zapf	Germany	12 Apr 1964	9 Jun 1979	357	36	61	8	49	2
Arek Zarczynski	Poland	3 Aug 1996	9 May 1998	54	25	11	2	0	0
Maik Zentrich	Germany	6 Aug 1995	18 May 2002	144	6	25	7	0	0
Leopold Zingerle	Germany	5 Aug 2016	25 May 2017	21	0	6	0	0	0
Günter Zimmermann	Germany	24 Sep 1969	24 Sep 1969	1	0	0	0	0	0
Fabian Zittlau	Germany	22 Feb 2015	13 Mar 2015	4	0	0	0	0	0
Player	Nation	Debut	Last match	League games	League goals	Cup games	Cup goals	European games	European goals

== Literature ==
Blau-Weißes Lexikon – 40 Jahre 1.FC Magdeburg. MDprint, Magdeburg 2005, ISBN 3-9808508-5-4.
