= 2017–18 1. FC Magdeburg season =

1. FC Magdeburg
2017–18 season
- Chairman: Peter Fechner
- Manager: Jens Härtel
- Stadium: MDCC-Arena
- 3. Liga: 2nd
- DFB-Pokal: Second round
- Saxony-Anhalt Cup: Quarter-finals
- All statistics correct as of 28 January 2018.

The 2017–18 1. FC Magdeburg season is the 52nd season in the football club's history. The season covers a period from 1 July 2017 to 30 June 2018.

== Players ==
=== Squad information ===
As of 4 February 2018

Note: Flags indicate national team as defined under FIFA eligibility rules; some limited exceptions apply. Players may hold more than one non-FIFA nationality.

No.	Pos.	Nation	Player
1	GK	GER	Jan Glinker
3	DF	GER	Christopher Handke
4	DF	GER	Leon Heynke
5	DF	GER	Felix Schiller
6	MF	GER	Björn Rother
7	FW	GER	Felix Lohkemper
8	MF	GER	Philip Türpitz
9	DF	GER	Marcel Costly
10	DF	GER	Nico Hammann
11	FW	GER	Christian Beck
12	GK	GER	Mario Seidel
14	DF	GER	Steffen Schäfer
15	MF	GER	Tobias Schwede

No.	Pos.	Nation	Player
16	DF	GER	Nils Butzen
17	FW	POL	Marius Sowislo (captain)
18	MF	GER	Florian Pick
19	MF	GER	Michel Niemeyer
20	MF	GER	Andreas Ludwig
21	FW	GER	Julius Düker
22	DF	CAN	André Hainault
23	MF	FRA	Charles-Elie Laprévotte
24	MF	TUN	Tarek Chahed
26	MF	GER	Gerrit Müller
30	GK	GER	Alexander Brunst
37	DF	GER	Richard Weil

== Friendly matches ==
Win Draw Loss

5 July 2017	(Germany) Eintracht Braunschweig	6–1	(Germany) 1. FC Magdeburg
18:30		Summary

11 July 2017	(Germany) FSV Barleben	1–6	(Germany) 1. FC Magdeburg
18:00		Summary

16 July 2017	(Germany) 1. FC Magdeburg	1–0	(Germany) Erzgebirge Aue
15:00		Summary

== Competitions ==
Win Draw Loss

=== 3. Liga ===
==== League table ====
Pos	Team	Pld	W	D	L	GF	GA	GD	Pts	Promotion, qualification or relegation
1	1. FC Magdeburg (C, P)	38	27	4	7	70	32	+38	85	Promotion to 2. Bundesliga and qualification for DFB-Pokal
2	SC Paderborn (P)	38	25	8	5	90	33	+57	83	Promotion to 2. Bundesliga and qualification for DFB-Pokal
3	Karlsruher SC	38	19	12	7	49	29	+20	69	Qualification for promotion play-offs and DFB-Pokal
4	Wehen Wiesbaden	38	21	5	12	76	39	+37	68	Qualification for DFB-Pokal
5	Würzburger Kickers	38	17	10	11	53	46	+7	61	

Source: DFB
Rules for classification: 1) Points; 2) Goal difference; 3) Goals scored
(C) Champions; (P) Promoted

==== Results summary ====
Overall								Home						Away					
Pld	W	D	L	GF	GA	GD	Pts	W	D	L	GF	GA	GD	W	D	L	GF	GA	GD
37	26	4	7	69	32	+37	82	15	3	1	41	11	+30	11	1	6	28	21	+7

Last updated: 5 May 2018.

==== Results by round ====
Matchday	1	2	3	4	5	6	7	8	9	10	11	12	13	14	15	16	17	18	19	20	21	22	23	24	25	26	27	28	29	30	31	32	33	34	35	36	37	38
Ground	A	H	A	H	A	H	H	A	H	A	H	A	H	A	H	A	H	A	H	H	A	H	A	H	A	A	H	A	H	A	H	A	H	A	H	A	H	A
Result	L	W	W	W	W	W	W	L	W	W	W	W	L	L	D	W	W	W	W	W	L	D	L	W	W	L	D	W	W	D	W	W	W	W	W	W	W	
Position	2	2	2	2	2	2	2	2	2	2	2	2	2	3	3	2	2	2	1	1	2	2	2	2	2	2	2	2	2	2	1	1	1	1	1	1	1	

Updated to match(es) played on 5 May 2018. Source:
A = Away; H = Home; W = Win; D = Draw; L = Loss

==== Matches ====
23 July 2017 Match 1	Sonnenhof Großaspach	4–1	1. FC Magdeburg	Aspach
14:00	Vitzthum (yellow card) 40' schiek 44'; Özdemir (yellow card) 46' (goal) 89'; Gyau 56'; Hägele 72'	Report	Hammann (yellow card) 77'; Sowislo (yellow card) 78'; Lohkemper 85'; Rother (yellow card) 86'; Butzen (yellow card) 88'	Stadium: Mechatronik Arena; Attendance: 3,150; Referee: (Germany) Benjamin Brand

29 July 2017 Match 2	1. FC Magdeburg	3–0	Rot-Weiß Erfurt	Magdeburg
14:00	Niemeyer 4'; Türpitz 27' 28'; Sowislo (yellow card) 38'; Erdmann (yellow card) 78'	Report	Menz (yellow card) 48' (yellow-red card); Odak (yellow card) 61'; Ludwig (yellow card) 90'	Stadium: MDCC-Arena; Attendance: 17,140; Referee: (Germany) Daniel Schlager

2 August 2017 Match 3	Meppen	1–2	1. FC Magdeburg	Meppen
19:00	Domaschke (yellow card) 3'; Girth 18'; Puttkammer (yellow card) 34'	Report	Ludwig 5' (pen.); Sowislo (yellow card) 24'; Niemeyer 65' (yellow card) 90+3'	Stadium: Hänsch-Arena; Attendance: 8,389; Referee: (Germany) Sören Storks

6 August 2017 Match 4	1. FC Magdeburg	2–1	Würzburger Kickers	Magdeburg
14:00	Schwede 7'; Weil 10' (pen.) (yellow card) 19'; Erdmann (yellow card) 22'	Report	Schuppan (yellow card) 5'; Bytyqi 80'; Kai Wagner (yellow card) 90+3'	Stadium: MDCC-Arena; Attendance: 15,922; Referee: (Germany) Christian Dingert

19 August 2017 Match 5	Preußen Münster	0–1	1. FC Magdeburg	Münster
14:00	Mai (yellow card) 69'; Kittner (yellow card) 82'; Rühle (yellow card) 88'	Report	Schiller (yellow card) 23'; Niemeyer 65'; Rother (yellow card) 86'	Stadium: Preußenstadion; Attendance: 7,269; Referee: (Germany) Patrick Alt

26 August 2017 Match 6	1. FC Magdeburg	4–1	Werder Bremen II	Magdeburg
14:00	Erdmann (yellow card) 29' (goal) 38'; Düker 78'; Türpitz 81' (pen.); Rother (yellow card) 89'; Lohkemper 90+1'	Report	Touré (yellow card) 40'; Jacobsen 44'	Stadium: MDCC-Arena; Attendance: 14,834; Referee: (Germany) Nicolas Winter

9 September 2017 Match 7	1. FC Magdeburg	2–0	Hansa Rostock	Magdeburg
14:00	Rother (yellow card) 25'; Türpitz 43'; Handke (yellow card) 50'; Lohkemper 68'; Erdmann (yellow card) 81'; Pick (yellow card) 90+1'	Report	Hüsing (yellow card) 17'; Alibaz (yellow card) 67'; Blaswich (yellow card) 68'	Stadium: MDCC-Arena; Attendance: 20,817; Referee: (Germany) Robert Hartmann (referee)

15 September 2017 Match 8	Zwickau	3–1	1. FC Magdeburg	Zwickau
19:00	Frick 22'; Könnecke (yellow card) 30'; König 41'; Bahn (yellow card) 45'; Antonitsch 63'	Report	Hammann (yellow card) 16'; Sowislo 45+3'; Handke (yellow card) 85'	Stadium: Stadion Zwickau; Attendance: 7,957; Referee: (Germany) Tobias Fritsch

19 September 2017 Match 9	1. FC Magdeburg	1–0	Paderborn	Magdeburg
19:00	Erdmann (yellow card) 23'; Schäfer (yellow card) 30'; Beck 62'; Rother (yellow card) 78'	Report	Herzenbruch (yellow card) 61'	Stadium: MDCC-Arena; Attendance: 16,826; Referee: (Germany) Benjamin Brand

24 September 2017 Match 10	Aalen	0–1	1. FC Magdeburg	Aalen
14:00	Vasiliadis (yellow card) 44'	Report	Ludwig (yellow card) 57'; Weil (yellow card) 67'; Schwede 80'; Lohkemper (yellow card) 90+3'	Stadium: OSTALB ARENA; Attendance: 4,298; Referee: (Germany) Michael Bacher

1 October 2017 Match 11	1. FC Magdeburg	2–0	Carl Zeiss Jena	Magdeburg
14:00	Türpitz 36'; Hammann 85'	Report		Stadium: MDCC-Arena; Attendance: 20,778; Referee: (Germany) Frank Willenborg

13 October 2017 Match 12	Osnabrück	0–2	1. FC Magdeburg	Osnabrück
19:00	Krasniqi (yellow card) 25'; Groß (yellow card) 51'; Sušac (yellow card) 81'	Report	Rother 14'; Türpitz 22' (pen.); Erdmann (yellow card) 45+2'	Stadium: Stadion an der Bremer Brücke; Attendance: 9,547; Referee: (Germany) Martin Petersen

21 October 2017 Match 13	1. FC Magdeburg	0–3	Unterhaching	Magdeburg
14:00	Türpitz (yellow card) 56'; Handke (yellow card) 75'	Report	Hagn 2'; Hain 44'; Dombrowka 64'	Stadium: MDCC-Arena; Attendance: 16,384; Referee: (Germany) Harm Osmers

29 October 2017 Match 14	Karlsruher SC	1–0	1. FC Magdeburg	Karlsruhe
14:00	Gordon (yellow card) 16'; Muslija (yellow card) 37'; Wanitzek 40'; Bader (yellow card) 53'	Report	Erdmann (yellow card) 41'; Rother (yellow card) 45'	Stadium: Wildparkstadion; Attendance: 12,748; Referee: (Germany) Robert Kampka

4 November 2017 Match 15	1. FC Magdeburg	0–0	Wehen Wiesbaden	Magdeburg
14:00	Rother (yellow card) 29'	Report	Breitkreuz (yellow card) 61'	Stadium: MDCC-Arena; Attendance: 15,264; Referee: (Germany) Manuel Gräfe

18 November 2017 Match 16	Fortuna Köln	1–2	1. FC Magdeburg	Cologne
14:00	Keita-Ruel 44' (pen.); Kessel (yellow card) 65'; Kegel (yellow card) 90+1'	Report	Rother (yellow card) 12'; Niemeyer 17'; Hammann (yellow card) 43'; Düker 64'	Stadium: Südstadion; Attendance: 4,706; Referee: (Germany) Bibiana Steinhaus

25 November 2017 Match 17	1. FC Magdeburg	2–1	Hallescher FC	Magdeburg
14:00	Beck 8'; Niemeyer 12'; Düker (yellow card) 52'; Handke (yellow card) 66'; Türpitz (red card) 71'	Report	Röser (yellow card) 18'; Handke 67' (o.g.); Bohl (yellow card) 71'; Ajani (red card) 72'	Stadium: MDCC-Arena; Attendance: 22,481; Referee: (Germany) Sven Jablonski

2 December 2017 Match 18	Chemnitzer FC	2–3	1. FC Magdeburg	Chemnitz
14:00	Frahn 28' 78'; Grote (yellow card) 34'; Baumgart (yellow card) 82'	Report	Beck 12' 21'; Schäfer (yellow card) 33'; Düker 39'; Laprévotte (yellow card) 75'	Stadium: community4you ARENA; Attendance: 7,847; Referee: (Germany) Henry Müller

8 December 2017 Match 19	1. FC Magdeburg	2–0	Sportfreunde Lotte	Magdeburg
19:00	Beck 8'; Handke 44' (yellow card) 89'; Rother (yellow card) 58'; Sowislo (yellow card) 75'; Weil (yellow card) 79'	Report	Rossmann (yellow card) 30'; Langlitz (yellow card) 48'; Freiberger (yellow card) 56'; Pires-Rodrigues (yellow card) 68'; Al Ghaddioui (yellow card) 87'	Stadium: MDCC-Arena; Attendance: 15,858; Referee: (Germany) Benjamin Cortus

16 December 2017 Match 20	1. FC Magdeburg	3–0	Sonnenhof Großaspach	Magdeburg
14:00	Niemeyer 7'; Beck 12'; Düker 29'	Report	Thermann (yellow card) 41'; Gehring (yellow card) 45+2'; Gyau (yellow card) 71' (yellow-red card)	Stadium: MDCC-Arena; Attendance: 14,835; Referee: (Germany) Jonas Weickenmeier

22 January 2018 Match 21	Rot-Weiß Erfurt	3–1	1. FC Magdeburg	Erfurt
20:30	Kurz (yellow card) 36'; Neuhold 70'; Laurito 75'; Huth 88'	Report	Weil (yellow card) 43'; Handke (yellow card) 45'; Butzen (yellow card) 58'; Beck 66' (yellow card) 81'	Stadium: Steigerwaldstadion; Attendance: 7,231; Referee: (Germany) Sören Storks

27 January 2018 Match 22	1. FC Magdeburg	0–0	Meppen	Magdeburg
14:00	Erdmann (yellow card) 37'	Report	Gebers (yellow card) 11'; Kleinsorge (yellow card) 43'; Wagner (yellow card) 67'; Bähre (yellow card) 90'	Stadium: MDCC-Arena; Attendance: 16,606; Referee: (Germany) Patrick Alt

3 February 2018 Match 23	Würzburger Kickers	1–0	1. FC Magdeburg	Würzburg
14:00	Neumann (yellow card) 28'; Ademi 42' (pen.); Müller (yellow card) 50'; Kai Wagner (yellow card) 58'	Report	Handke (yellow card) 26'; Schwede (yellow card) 34'; Schiller (yellow card) 64'; Beck (yellow card) 88'	Stadium: flyeralarm Arena; Attendance: 6,670; Referee: (Germany) Henry Müller

10 February 2018 Match 24	1. FC Magdeburg	v	Preußen Münster	Magdeburg
				Stadium: MDCC-Arena

17 February 2018 Match 25	Werder Bremen II	v	1. FC Magdeburg	Bremen
				Stadium: Weserstadion Platz 11

24 February 2018 Match 26	Hansa Rostock	v	1. FC Magdeburg	Rostock
				Stadium: Ostseestadion

3 March 2018 Match 27	1. FC Magdeburg	v	Zwickau	Magdeburg
				Stadium: MDCC-Arena

7 March 2018 Match 28	Paderborn	v	1. FC Magdeburg	Paderborn
				Stadium: Benteler-Arena

10 March 2018 Match 29	1. FC Magdeburg	v	Aalen	Magdeburg
				Stadium: MDCC-Arena

17 March 2018 Match 30	Carl Zeiss Jena	v	1. FC Magdeburg	Jena
				Stadium: Ernst-Abbe-Sportfeld

24 March 2018 Match 31	1. FC Magdeburg	v	Osnabrück	Magdeburg
				Stadium: MDCC-Arena

31 March 2018 Match 32	Unterhaching	v	1. FC Magdeburg	Unterhaching
				Stadium: Sportpark Unterhaching

7 April 2018 Match 33	1. FC Magdeburg	v	Karlsruher SC	Magdeburg
				Stadium: MDCC-Arena

14 April 2018 Match 34	Wehen Wiesbaden	v	1. FC Magdeburg	Wiesbaden
				Stadium: Brita-Arena

21 April 2018 Match 35	1. FC Magdeburg	v	Fortuna Köln	Magdeburg
				Stadium: MDCC-Arena

28 April 2018 Match 36	Hallescher FC	v	1. FC Magdeburg	Halle (Saale)
				Stadium: Erdgas Sportpark

5 May 2018 Match 37	1. FC Magdeburg	v	Chemnitzer FC	Magdeburg
				Stadium: MDCC-Arena

12 May 2018 Match 38	Sportfreunde Lotte	v	1. FC Magdeburg	Lotte
				Stadium: Frimo Stadion

=== DFB-Pokal ===
13 August 2017 Round 1	1. FC Magdeburg	2–0	FC Augsburg	Magdeburg
18:30	Sowislo (yellow card) 52'; Beck 87'; Schwede 90+1'; Erdmann (yellow card) 90+3'	Report	Khedira (yellow card) 90+3'	Stadium: MDCC-Arena; Attendance: 21,641; Referee: (Germany) Guido Winkmann

24 October 2017 Last 32	1. FC Magdeburg	0–5	Borussia Dortmund	Magdeburg
20:45		Report	Castro 42'; Isak 47' (yellow card) 48'; Zagadou (yellow card) 56'; Papastathopoulos (yellow card) 66'; Yarmolenko 73' (pen.); Marc Bartra 79'; Kagawa 90'	Stadium: MDCC-Arena; Attendance: 23,102; Referee: (Germany) Daniel Siebert (referee)

=== Saxony-Anhalt Cup ===
11 November 2017 Last 16	Naumberg	1–2	1. FC Magdeburg	Naumburg (Saale)
13:00		Report		Stadium: Stadt-Stadion Naumburg

21 March 2018 Quarter Final	Hallescher FC	0–1	1. FC Magdeburg	Halle (Saale)
20:30		Summary		Stadium: Erdgas Sportpark

1 May 2018 Semi Final	BSV Halle-Ammendorf	0–3	1. FC Magdeburg	Halle (Saale)
14:00		Report		Stadium: Stadion der Waggonbauer

21 May 2018 Final	1. FC Lok Stendal	v	1. FC Magdeburg	Stendal
12:30				Stadium: Stadion am Hölzchen
