= Vorm =

Vorm is a surname. Notable people with the surname include:

- Eddy Vorm (born 1989), Dutch footballer
- Michel Vorm (born 1983), Dutch footballer
