= 2014–15 Eintracht Braunschweig season =

Eintracht Braunschweig
2014–15 season
- Chairman: Sebastian Ebel
- Manager: Torsten Lieberknecht
- Stadium: Eintracht-Stadion, Braunschweig, Lower Saxony
- 2. Bundesliga: 6th
- DFB-Pokal: Round of 16
- Top goalscorer: League: Håvard Nielsen (8 goals); All: Håvard Nielsen (10 goals)
- Highest home attendance: 23,100 (vs. St. Pauli)
- Lowest home attendance: 20,200 (vs. Aue)
- Average home league attendance: 21,610
Home colours	Away colours

The 2014–15 Eintracht Braunschweig season is the 121st season in the club's football history. In 2014–15 the club plays in the 2. Bundesliga, the second tier of German football. It is the club's first season in this league since having been relegated from the Bundesliga in 2014.

== Review and events ==
The 2014–15 season of Eintracht Braunschweig began on 16 June with their first training session.

The draw for the first round of the 2014–15 DFB-Pokal happened on 1 June and paired Braunschweig with Bremen-Liga team Bremer SV.

On 12 July 2014, the team headed for a week-long pre-season training camp in Leogang, Salzburg, Austria.

The draw for the second round of the DFB-Pokal happened on 23 August and paired Braunschweig with Regionalliga Bayern team Würzburger Kickers.

On 16 January 2015, the team headed for a week-long winter training camp in Jerez de la Frontera, Andalusia, Spain.

== Matches and results ==
=== Legend ===
Win Tie Loss

=== Friendly matches ===
29 June 2014	Braunschweiger Zeitung Select XI	0–6	Eintracht Braunschweig	Braunschweig
14:00		Report	Kessel 11'; Kruppke 13'; Doğan 28'; Henn 54'; Pfitzner 64'; Reichel 72'	Stadium: Eintracht-Stadion; Attendance: 7,000

1 July 2014	SV Arminia Vechelde	0–16	Eintracht Braunschweig	Vechelde
18:00		Report	Ademi 7'; Zuck 10', 21', 28'; Kluft 29'; Khelifi 45'; Kruppke 52', 60', 64', 72', 76'; Nielsen 67'; Hochscheidt 73', 75', 87'; Pfitzner 88'	Stadium: Auestadion; Attendance: 3,000

6 July 2014	FC Eintracht Northeim	0–6	Eintracht Braunschweig	Northeim
15:30		Report	Kruppke 31'; Boland 37'; Khelifi 54', 66'; Vrančić 57', 78'	Stadium: Gustav-Wegner-Stadion; Attendance: 1,500

9 July 2014	Eintracht Braunschweig	1–0	(Denmark) SønderjyskE	Salzgitter
18:00	Theuerkauf 4'	Report		Stadium: Stadion am Salzgittersee; Attendance: 800

13 July 2014	Eintracht Braunschweig	2–1	(Czech Republic) FC Zbrojovka Brno	Uttendorf, Austria
17:00	Khelifi 67'; Correia 70'	Report; Report	Marković 60'	Attendance: 50

15 July 2014	Eintracht Braunschweig	3–0	(Albania) Teuta Durrës	Hochfilzen, Austria
11:00	Bakenga 37'; Ademi 60'; Vrančić 82'	Report		Stadium: Sportplatz Hochfilzen; Attendance: 80

15 July 2014	Eintracht Braunschweig	2–1	(Russia) Dynamo Moscow	Bramberg am Wildkogel, Austria
19:00	Reichel 51'; Kruppke 63'	Report; Report	Smolov 29'	Stadium: Sportplatz Bramberg; Attendance: 350

17 July 2014	Eintracht Braunschweig	1–1	(Israel) Maccabi Haifa	Leogang, Austria
17:00	Nielsen 83'	Report	Idrissou 48'	Stadium: Steinbergstadion; Attendance: 250

25 July 2014	Eintracht Braunschweig	1–2	(Spain) Sevilla FC	Braunschweig
18:30	Theuerkauf 30'	Report	Juan Muñoz 79'; Hedenstad 84' (o.g.)	Stadium: Eintracht-Stadion; Attendance: 8,050

5 September 2014	DJK-SG Zeilsheim	0–23	Eintracht Braunschweig	Zeilsheim
18:00		Report	Correia 8'; Ademi 11', 15', 44', 44', 46', 66'; Kruppke 14', 20'; Theuerkauf 18'; DJK-SG Zeilsheim 23' (o.g.); Ryu 33', 38', 56'; Henn 53'; R. Korte 59'; Boland 61' (pen.); Düker 75', 79'; Holtmann 77', 89'; Doğan 81'; G. Korte 87'	Stadium: Sportanlage Hohe Kanzel; Attendance: 450

14 November 2014	Hamburger SV	1–0	Eintracht Braunschweig	Hamburg
	Marcos 23'	Report		Stadium: Hamburger SV training ground Attendance: 0

13 January 2015	Eintracht Braunschweig	0–0	1. FC Magdeburg	Gifhorn
18:30		Report		Stadium: Stadion Flutmulde; Attendance: 1,000

18 January 2015	Eintracht Braunschweig	1–1	1. FSV Mainz 05	Algeciras, Spain
16:00	Pfitzner 75' (pen.)	Report	Geis 33' (pen.)	Stadium: Estadio Nuevo Mirador; Attendance: 100

19 January 2015	Eintracht Braunschweig	3–5	(Switzerland) FC Luzern	Los Barrios, Spain
16:00	Khelifi 48'; Düker 60'; Kessel 90'	Report	Lezcano 9'; Schneuwly 17'; Hyka 47', 51'; Winter 74'	Attendance: 100

22 January 2015	Eintracht Braunschweig	1–1	Preußen Münster	Jerez de la Frontera, Spain
16:00	Riedel 45' (o.g.)	Report	Piossek 36'	Stadium: Hotel Montecastillo Golf Resort; Attendance: 70

30 January 2015	Eintracht Braunschweig	2–0	(Switzerland) FC Basel	Braunschweig
18:30	Nielsen 63'; Zuck 71'	Report		Stadium: Eintracht-Stadion; Attendance: 3,850

26 March 2015	Eintracht Braunschweig	2–0	SC Paderborn 07	Braunschweig
18:00	R. Korte 61', 64'	Report		Stadium: Eintracht-Stadion, B-Platz; Attendance: 400

=== 2. Bundesliga ===
==== League fixtures and results ====
1 August 2014 1	Fortuna Düsseldorf	2–2	Eintracht Braunschweig	Düsseldorf
20:30	Liendl 34'; Benschop 65'	Summary	Reichel 60'; Nielsen 84'	Stadium: Esprit Arena; Attendance: 41,667; Referee: Deniz Aytekin (Oberasbach)

9 August 2014 2	Eintracht Braunschweig	3–0	1. FC Heidenheim	Braunschweig
15:30	Nielsen 38'; Reichel 56', 73'	Summary		Stadium: Eintracht-Stadion; Attendance: 21,430; Referee: Thorsten Kinhöfer (Herne)

24 August 2014 3	1. FC Kaiserslautern	2–1	Eintracht Braunschweig	Kaiserslautern
13:30	Matmour 11'; Lakić 53' (pen.)	Summary	Kruppke 3'	Stadium: Fritz-Walter-Stadion; Attendance: 33,289; Referee: Günter Perl (Pullach)

31 August 2014 4	Eintracht Braunschweig	1–2	VfL Bochum	Braunschweig
13:30	Boland 17'	Summary	Terodde 5', 77'	Stadium: Eintracht-Stadion; Attendance: 22,275; Referee: Manuel Gräfe (Berlin)

13 September 2014 5	RB Leipzig	3–1	Eintracht Braunschweig	Leipzig
13:00	Poulsen 19', 84'; Frahn 20'	Summary	Nielsen 48'	Stadium: Red Bull Arena; Attendance: 24,949; Referee: Felix Zwayer (Berlin)

19 September 2014 6	Eintracht Braunschweig	2–0	Darmstadt 98	Braunschweig
18:30	Pfitzner (yellow card) 17'; Nielsen 34'; Boland (yellow card) 48'; Kruppke (yellow card) 58' (goal) 90'; Decarli (yellow card) 67'; Kessel (yellow card) 90'	Summary	Stroh-Engel (yellow card) 39'; Heller (yellow card) 62'; Exslager (yellow card) 90'	Stadium: Eintracht-Stadion; Attendance: 21,805; Referee: Patrick Ittrich (Hamburg)

23 September 2014 7	FC St. Pauli	1–0	Eintracht Braunschweig	Hamburg
17:30	Sobiech 15'	Summary		Stadium: Millerntor-Stadion; Attendance: 27,013; Referee: Peter Sippel (Munich)

26 September 2014 8	Eintracht Braunschweig	2–1	SV Sandhausen	Braunschweig
18:30	Kessel 38'; Bakenga 54'	Summary	Wooten 90' (pen.)	Stadium: Eintracht-Stadion; Attendance: 20,680; Referee: Christian Dietz (Kronach)

5 October 2014 9	FC Ingolstadt 04	1–0	Eintracht Braunschweig	Ingolstadt
13:30	Hinterseer 46'	Summary		Stadium: Audi Sportpark; Attendance: 7,750; Referee: Martin Petersen (Stuttgart)

18 October 2014 10	Eintracht Braunschweig	2–2	SpVgg Greuther Fürth	Braunschweig
13:00	Kessel 72', 90'	Summary	Stiepermann 59'; Przybyłko 68'	Stadium: Eintracht-Stadion; Attendance: 21,200; Referee: Markus Schmidt (Stuttgart)

26 October 2014 11	TSV 1860 München	1–2	Eintracht Braunschweig	Munich
13:30	Schindler 38'	Summary	Zuck 18'; R. Korte 49'	Stadium: Allianz Arena; Attendance: 20,300; Referee: Robert Kempter (Sauldorf)

2 November 2014 12	Eintracht Braunschweig	2–1	VfR Aalen	Braunschweig
13:30	Ryu 32'; Kruppke 72'	Summary	Ludwig 60'	Stadium: Eintracht-Stadion; Attendance: 21,140; Referee: Benjamin Cortus (Röthenbach an der Pegnitz)

9 November 2014 13	FC Erzgebirge Aue	1–2	Eintracht Braunschweig	Aue
13:30	Novikovas 43' (pen.)	Summary	Ryu 9'; Hedenstad 59'	Stadium: Sparkassen-Erzgebirgsstadion; Attendance: 10,050; Referee: Bastian Dankert (Rostock)

22 November 2014 14	FSV Frankfurt	0–3	Eintracht Braunschweig	Frankfurt
13:00		Summary	Nielsen 1', 44'; Bakenga 54'	Stadium: Frankfurter Volksbank Stadion; Attendance: 5,423; Referee: Christian Bandurski (Oberhausen)

1 December 2014 15	Eintracht Braunschweig	1–0	1. FC Nürnberg	Braunschweig
20:15	Nielsen 38'	Summary		Stadium: Eintracht-Stadion; Attendance: 21,515; Referee: Guido Winkelmann (Kerken)

7 December 2014 16	Karlsruher SC	1–0	Eintracht Braunschweig	Karlsruhe
13:30	Torres 39'	Summary		Stadium: Wildparkstadion; Attendance: 13,113; Referee: Jochen Drees (Münster-Sarmsheim)

13 December 2014 17	Eintracht Braunschweig	1–1	1. FC Union Berlin	Braunschweig
13:00	Ryu 22'	Summary	Thiel 28'	Stadium: Eintracht-Stadion; Attendance: 23,050; Referee: Robert Kempter (Sauldorf)

16 December 2014 18	Eintracht Braunschweig	2–1	Fortuna Düsseldorf	Braunschweig
17:30	Nielsen 67'; Kessel 90'	Summary	Halloran 68'	Stadium: Eintracht-Stadion; Attendance: 21,410; Referee: Sascha Stegemann (Niederkassel)

19 December 2014 19	1. FC Heidenheim	0–1	Eintracht Braunschweig	Heidenheim an der Brenz
18:30		Summary	Ryu 61'	Stadium: Voith-Arena; Attendance: 11,800; Referee: Felix Brych (Munich)

8 February 2015 20	Eintracht Braunschweig	0–2	1. FC Kaiserslautern	Braunschweig
13:30		Summary	Hofmann 35'; Ring 73'	Stadium: Eintracht-Stadion; Attendance: 22,775; Referee: Felix Zwayer (Berlin)

13 February 2015 21	VfL Bochum	3–2	Eintracht Braunschweig	Bochum
18:30	Terodde 36', 47'; Terrazzino 41'	Summary	Boland 3'; Kessel 84'	Stadium: Rewirpower-Stadion; Attendance: 13,778; Referee: Manuel Gräfe (Berlin)

23 February 2015 22	Eintracht Braunschweig	1–1	RB Leipzig	Braunschweig
20:15	Berggreen 45'	Summary	Kaiser 84'	Stadium: Eintracht-Stadion; Attendance: 20,650; Referee: Robert Hartmann (Wangen im Allgäu)

27 February 2015 23	Darmstadt 98	1–0	Eintracht Braunschweig	Darmstadt
18:30	Rosenthal 90'	Summary		Stadium: Stadion am Böllenfalltor; Attendance: 13,600; Referee: Thorsten Kinhöfer (Herne)

7 March 2015 24	Eintracht Braunschweig	0–2	FC St. Pauli	Braunschweig
13:00		Summary	Gonther 25'; Sobiech 65'	Stadium: Eintracht-Stadion; Attendance: 23,100; Referee: Christian Dingert (Lebecksmühle)

15 March 2015 25	SV Sandhausen	0–1	Eintracht Braunschweig	Sandhausen
13:30		Summary	Omladič 77'	Stadium: Hardtwaldstadion; Attendance: 5,831; Referee: Christian Dietz (Kronach)

21 March 2015 26	Eintracht Braunschweig	0–0	FC Ingolstadt 04	Braunschweig
13:00		Summary		Stadium: Eintracht-Stadion; Attendance: 20,700; Referee: Marco Fritz (Korb)

4 April 2015 27	SpVgg Greuther Fürth	1–2	Eintracht Braunschweig	Fürth
13:00	Žulj 28'	Summary	Thesker 31' (o.g.); Reichel 79'	Stadium: Stadion am Laubenweg; Attendance: 10,280; Referee: Robert Kampka (Mainz)

11 April 2015 28	Eintracht Braunschweig	2–0	TSV 1860 München	Braunschweig
13:00	Zuck 5'; Hochscheidt 47'	Summary		Stadium: Eintracht-Stadion; Attendance: 22,050; Referee: Tobias Welz (Wiesbaden)

18 April 2015 29	VfR Aalen	2–1	Eintracht Braunschweig	Aalen
13:00	Quaner 54'; Ofosu-Ayeh 69'	Summary	Boland 51'	Stadium: Scholz-Arena; Attendance: 7,019; Referee: Christian Dietz (Kronach)

27 April 2015 30	Eintracht Braunschweig	4–2	FC Erzgebirge Aue	Braunschweig
20:15	Hochscheidt 2'; Zuck 69'; Berggreen 77'; Pfitzner 88' (pen.)	Summary	Wood 11'; Vučur 31'	Stadium: Eintracht-Stadion; Attendance: 20,200; Referee: Robert Kempter (Sauldorf)

2 May 2015 31	Eintracht Braunschweig	2–0	FSV Frankfurt	Braunschweig
13:00	Berggreen 59', 69'	Summary		Stadium: Eintracht-Stadion; Attendance: 21,050; Referee: Martin Thomsen (Kleve)

10 May 2015 32	1. FC Nürnberg	3–1	Eintracht Braunschweig	Nuremberg
13:30	Reichel 32' (o.g.); Blum 52'; Burgstaller 69'	Summary	Berggreen 68'	Stadium: Grundig-Stadion; Attendance: 27,985; Referee: René Rohde (Rostock)

17 May 2015 33	Eintracht Braunschweig	0–2	Karlsruher SC	Braunschweig
15:30		Summary	Hennings 43', 87'	Stadium: Eintracht-Stadion; Attendance: 22,335; Referee: Felix Brych (Munich)

24 May 2015 34	1. FC Union Berlin	2–0	Eintracht Braunschweig	Berlin
15:30	Schönheim 48'; Polter 59'	Summary		Stadium: Stadion An der Alten Försterei; Attendance: 21,717; Referee: Markus Schmidt (Stuttgart)

==== League table ====
Pos	Team	Pld	W	D	L	GF	GA	GD	Pts
4	1. FC Kaiserslautern	34	14	14	6	45	31	+14	56
5	RB Leipzig	34	13	11	10	39	31	+8	50
6	Eintracht Braunschweig	34	15	5	14	44	41	+3	50
7	Union Berlin	34	12	11	11	46	51	−5	47
8	1. FC Heidenheim	34	12	10	12	49	44	+5	46

Source: DFB
Rules for classification: 1) Points; 2) Goal difference; 3) Goals scored

=== DFB-Pokal ===
16 August 2014 Round 1	Bremer SV	0–1	Eintracht Braunschweig	Bremen
15:30		Summary	Nielsen 46'	Stadium: Weserstadion, Platz 11; Attendance: 2,901; Referee: Martin Thomsen (Kleve)

29 October 2014 Round 2	Würzburger Kickers	0–1	Eintracht Braunschweig	Würzburg
19:00		Summary	Nielsen 78'	Stadium: flyeralarm Arena; Attendance: 11,240; Referee: Robert Kampka (Mainz)

4 March 2015 Round 3	FC Bayern Munich	2–0	Eintracht Braunschweig	Munich
20:30	Alaba 45'; Götze 57'	Summary		Stadium: Allianz Arena; Attendance: 75,000; Referee: Jochen Drees (Münster-Sarmsheim)

== Squad ==
=== Current squad ===
As of 28 April 2015

Squad Season 2014–15
No.	Player	Nat.	Birthday	at BTSV since	previous club	League matches	League goals	Cup matches	Cup goals
Goalkeepers
1	Marjan Petković	German	22 May 1979	2009	FSV Frankfurt	1	0	0	0
33	Rafał Gikiewicz	Polish	26 Oct 1987	2014	Śląsk Wrocław	33	0	3	0
Defenders
2	Vegar Eggen Hedenstad	Norwegian	26 Jun 1991	2014	SC Freiburg	28	1	2	0
3	Saulo Decarli	Swiss	4 Feb 1992	2014	Livorno	17	0	1	0
4	Matthias Henn	German	28 Apr 1985	2007	1. FC Kaiserslautern	3	0	2	0
5	Benjamin Kessel	German	1 Oct 1987	2010	FSV Mainz 05 II	28	5	3	0
8	Deniz Doğan	Turk	20 Oct 1979	2007	VfB Lübeck	7	0	0	0
19	Ken Reichel	German	19 Dec 1986	2007	Hamburger SV II	32	4	3	0
21	Jan Washausen	German	2 Oct 1988	2007	Youth system	3	0	0	0
24	Maximilian Sauer	German	15 May 1994	2014	Youth system	6	0	1	0
25	Marcel Correia	Portuguese	16 May 1989	2011	1. FC Kaiserslautern II	29	0	3	0
36	Mohammad Baghdadi	German	30 Oct 1996	2014	Youth system	1	0	0	0
Midfielders
6	Damir Vrančić	Bosnian	4 Oct 1985	2009	Borussia Dortmund II	12	0	0	0
10	Mirko Boland	German	23 Apr 1987	01/09	MSV Duisburg II	33	3	3	0
11	Jan Hochscheidt	German	4 Oct 1987	2013	FC Erzgebirge Aue	18	2	0	0
12	Nik Omladič	Slovenian	21 Aug 1989	01/15	Olimpija Ljubljana	15	1	1	0
13	Raffael Korte	German	29 Aug 1990	2011	TuS Mechtersheim	17	1	2	0
15	Norman Theuerkauf	German	24 Jan 1987	2009	Eintracht Frankfurt II	24	0	2	0
17	Gerrit Holtmann	German	25 Mar 1995	04/15	Youth system	1	0	0	0
22	Salim Khelifi	Swiss	26 Jan 1994	01/14	Lausanne-Sport	9	0	2	0
31	Marc Pfitzner	German	28 Aug 1984	2007	Youth system	17	1	2	0
Strikers
7	Håvard Nielsen	Norwegian	15 Jul 1993	01/14	RB Salzburg	30	8	2	2
9	Emil Berggreen	Danish	10 May 1993	01/15	Hobro IK	13	5	0	0
14	Ryu Seung-woo	South Korean	17 Dec 1993	2014	Bayer 04 Leverkusen	16	4	2	0
20	Torsten Oehrl	German	7 Jan 1986	2013	FC Augsburg	0	0	0	0
26	Julius Düker	German	4 Jan 1996	2014	Youth system	9	0	1	0
30	Hendrick Zuck	German	21 Jul 1990	2014	SC Freiburg	31	3	3	0
32	Dennis Kruppke (captain)	German	1 Apr 1980	01/08	SC Freiburg	17	3	2	0
35	Haris Hyseni	German	14 Sep 1992	04/15	Youth system	1	0	0	0
No longer at the club
9	Orhan Ademi	Swiss	28 Oct 1991	2012	SC Rheindorf Altach	5	0	1	0
17	Björn Kluft	German	11 Jan 1990	2012	SC Preußen Münster	0	0	0	0
23	Mushaga Bakenga	Norwegian	8 Aug 1992	2014	Club Brugge	17	2	1	0
27	Gianluca Korte	German	29 Aug 1990	2011	TuS Mechtersheim	0	0	0	0
Last updated: 25 May 2015

=== Transfers ===
==== Summer ====
In:

No.	Pos.	Nation	Player
2	DF	NOR	Vegar Eggen Hedenstad (on loan from SC Freiburg)
3	DF	SUI	Saulo Decarli (from Livorno, previously on loan at Avellino)
13	MF	GER	Raffael Korte (loan return from 1. FC Saarbrücken)
14	FW	KOR	Ryu Seung-woo (on loan from Bayer 04 Leverkusen)
17	MF	GER	Björn Kluft (loan return from SV Sandhausen)
23	FW	NOR	Mushaga Bakenga (on loan from Club Brugge, previously on loan at Esbjerg)
24	DF	GER	Maximilian Sauer (from Eintracht Braunschweig II)
26	FW	GER	Julius Düker (from Eintracht Braunschweig U19)
30	FW	GER	Hendrick Zuck (on loan from SC Freiburg)
33	GK	POL	Rafał Gikiewicz (from Śląsk Wrocław)
36	DF	GER	Mohammad Baghdadi (from Eintracht Braunschweig U19)

Out:

No.	Pos.	Nation	Player
3	DF	BIH	Ermin Bičakčić (to TSG 1899 Hoffenheim)
12	FW	COD	Domi Kumbela (to Karabükspor)
14	MF	NOR	Omar Elabdellaoui (to Olympiacos F.C.)
17	MF	GER	Kevin Kratz (to SV Sandhausen)
22	FW	GER	Jonas Erwig-Drüppel (to SSV Jahn Regensburg)
24	MF	GER	Timo Perthel (to VfL Bochum)
26	GK	IRI	Daniel Davari (to Grasshopper Club Zürich)
33	MF	GER	Marco Caligiuri (to SpVgg Greuther Fürth)
35	GK	GER	Benjamin Later (released)
38	MF	GER	Karim Bellarabi (loan return to Bayer 04 Leverkusen)

==== Winter ====
In:

No.	Pos.	Nation	Player
9	FW	DEN	Emil Berggreen (from Hobro IK)
12	MF	SLO	Nik Omladič (from Olimpija Ljubljana)
17	MF	GER	Gerrit Holtmann (from Eintracht Braunschweig II)
35	FW	GER	Haris Hyseni (from Eintracht Braunschweig II)

Out:

No.	Pos.	Nation	Player
9	FW	SUI	Orhan Ademi (on loan to VfR Aalen)
17	MF	GER	Björn Kluft (to Rot-Weiss Essen)
23	FW	NOR	Mushaga Bakenga (to Molde FK, on loan from Club Brugge)
27	FW	GER	Gianluca Korte (on loan to VfR Aalen)

== Management and coaching staff ==
Since 12 May 2008 Torsten Lieberknecht is the manager of Eintracht Braunschweig.

Position	Staff
Manager	Torsten Lieberknecht
Assistant manager	Darius Scholtysik
Assistant manager/athletic trainer	Jürgen Rische
Goalkeeping coach	Alexander Kunze
Sporting director	Marc Arnold
Chief physiotherapist	Patrick Bick

== Reserve team ==
Eintracht Braunschweig II plays in the fourth-tier Regionalliga Nord for the 2014–15 season.

=== Current squad ===
As of 3 November 2014 Note: Flags indicate national team as defined under FIFA eligibility rules; some limited exceptions apply. Players may hold more than one non-FIFA nationality.

No.	Pos.	Nation	Player
1	GK	GER	Marcel Engelhardt
2	DF	GER	Marcel Schreyer
3	DF	GER	Dennis Slamar
4	DF	GER	Maurice Fiolka
7	MF	AZE	Ilter Tashkin
8	FW	GER	Morten Rüdiger
9	MF	GER	Gerrit Holtmann
10	MF	GER	Sven Hartwig
11	FW	GER	Haris Hyseni
12	GK	GER	Hendrik Hilpert

No.	Pos.	Nation	Player
13	MF	GER	Lukas Kierdorf
14	DF	IRQ	Umed Zandi
15	MF	GER	Jenni Marquardt
16	FW	GER	Brian Behrens
17	MF	GER	Niclas Erlbeck
18	MF	GER	Felix Drinkuth
19	MF	GER	Marcel Bär
20	MF	GER	Nils Göwecke
22	DF	GER	Maximilian Sauer

=== Staff ===
Position	Staff
Manager	Henning Bürger
Assistant manager	Markus Unger
