= Roman Hauk =

German footballer

Personal information
- Full name: Roman Hauk
- Date of birth: 15 April 1999 (age 27)
- Place of birth: Bretten, Germany
- Height: 1.93 m (6 ft 4 in)
- Position: Centre-back

Team information
- Current team: FC Astoria Walldorf
- Number: 5

Youth career
- –2011: FC Neibsheim
- 2011–2017: SV Sandhausen

Senior career*
Years	Team	Apps	(Gls)
2017–2020	SV Sandhausen II	69	(4)
2019–2020	SV Sandhausen	1	(0)
2020–	FC Astoria Walldorf	168	(12)
- * Club domestic league appearances and goals as of 24 September 2026

Roman Hauk (born 15 April 1999) is a German footballer who plays as a centre-back for FC Astoria Walldorf.

== Career ==
Hauk made his professional debut for SV Sandhausen in the 2. Bundesliga on 21 June 2020, coming on as a substitute in the 55th minute for Gerrit Nauber in the home match against Dynamo Dresden, which finished as a 0–1 loss.

He joined FC Astoria Walldorf on 1 July 2020.
