= Maximilian Waack =

German footballer

Personal information
- Date of birth: 12 January 1996 (age 30)
- Place of birth: Ludwigshafen, Germany
- Height: 1.73 m (5 ft 8 in)
- Position: Midfielder

Team information
- Current team: FC Astoria Walldorf
- Number: 10

Youth career
- Friesenheim
- Oggersheim
- –2013: 1. FC Kaiserslautern
- 2013–2014: Astoria Walldorf
- 2014–2015: 1899 Hoffenheim

Senior career*
Years	Team	Apps	(Gls)
2015–2018	1899 Hoffenheim II	66	(7)
2018–2019	Austria Lustenau	25	(1)
2019	TuS Mechtersheim	7	(0)
2019–	FC Astoria Walldorf	191	(18)
- * Club domestic league appearances and goals as of 24 September 2026

Maximilian Waack (born 12 January 1996) is a German professional footballer who plays as a midfielder for FC Astoria Walldorf.

== Career ==
On 4 August 2019, it was announced that Waack had joined TuS Mechtersheim.

In December 2019, he signed for FC Astoria Walldorf on a one-and-a-half-year contract.

== Career statistics ==
As of 10 December 2018

Appearances and goals by club, season and competition
Club	Season	League			Cup		Continental		Other		Total	
Club	Season	Division	Apps	Goals	Apps	Goals	Apps	Goals	Apps	Goals	Apps	Goals
1899 Hoffenheim II	2015–16	Regionalliga Südwest	8	1	0	0	–		0	0	8	1
1899 Hoffenheim II	2016–17	Regionalliga Südwest	30	3	0	0	–		0	0	30	3
1899 Hoffenheim II	2017–18	Regionalliga Südwest	28	3	0	0	–		0	0	28	3
1899 Hoffenheim II	Total		66	7	0	0	0	0	0	0	66	7
Austria Lustenau	2018–19	2. Liga	14	0	1	0	–		0	0	15	0
Career total			80	7	1	0	0	0	1	0	81	7
