= Tim Fahrenholz =

German footballer

Personal information
- Full name: Tim Fahrenholz
- Date of birth: 22 March 1994 (age 32)
- Place of birth: Darmstadt, Germany
- Height: 1.71 m (5 ft 7 in)
- Position: Midfielder

Team information
- Current team: FC Astoria Walldorf
- Number: 7

Youth career
- 2009–2010: SV Darmstadt 98
- 2010–2013: 1. FSV Mainz 05

Senior career*
Years	Team	Apps	(Gls)
2013–2014	1. FSV Mainz 05 II	10	(0)
2015–2018	Karlsruher SC II	80	(14)
2016–2018	Karlsruher SC	4	(0)
2018–	FC Astoria Walldorf	175	(9)
- * Club domestic league appearances and goals as of 24 September 2026

Tim Fahrenholz (born 22 March 1994) is a German footballer who plays as a midfielder for FC Astoria Walldorf.
