= Andreas Schön =

German footballer

Personal information
- Date of birth: 9 August 1989 (age 37)
- Place of birth: Heidelberg, West Germany
- Height: 1.75 m (5 ft 9 in)
- Position: Attacking midfielder

Team information
- Current team: FC Astoria Walldorf (head coach)

Youth career
- SV Sandhausen
- –2008: 1899 Hoffenheim

Senior career*
Years	Team	Apps	(Gls)
2008–2009	1899 Hoffenheim II	33	(9)
2009–2011	VfR Aalen	50	(4)
2011–2012	Werder Bremen II	30	(1)
2012–2014	1899 Hoffenheim II	14	(1)
2014–2022	FC Astoria Walldorf	228	(35)
2018–2023	FC Astoria Walldorf II	31	(4)

Managerial career
- 2023–2025: FC Astoria Walldorf (assistant)
- 2025–: FC Astoria Walldorf (head coach)
- * Club domestic league appearances and goals

Andreas Schön (born 9 August 1989) is a German professional footballer who played as an attacking midfielder. Who is currently the head coach of for FC Astoria Walldorf.
