= Dennis Kruppke =

German footballer (born 1980)

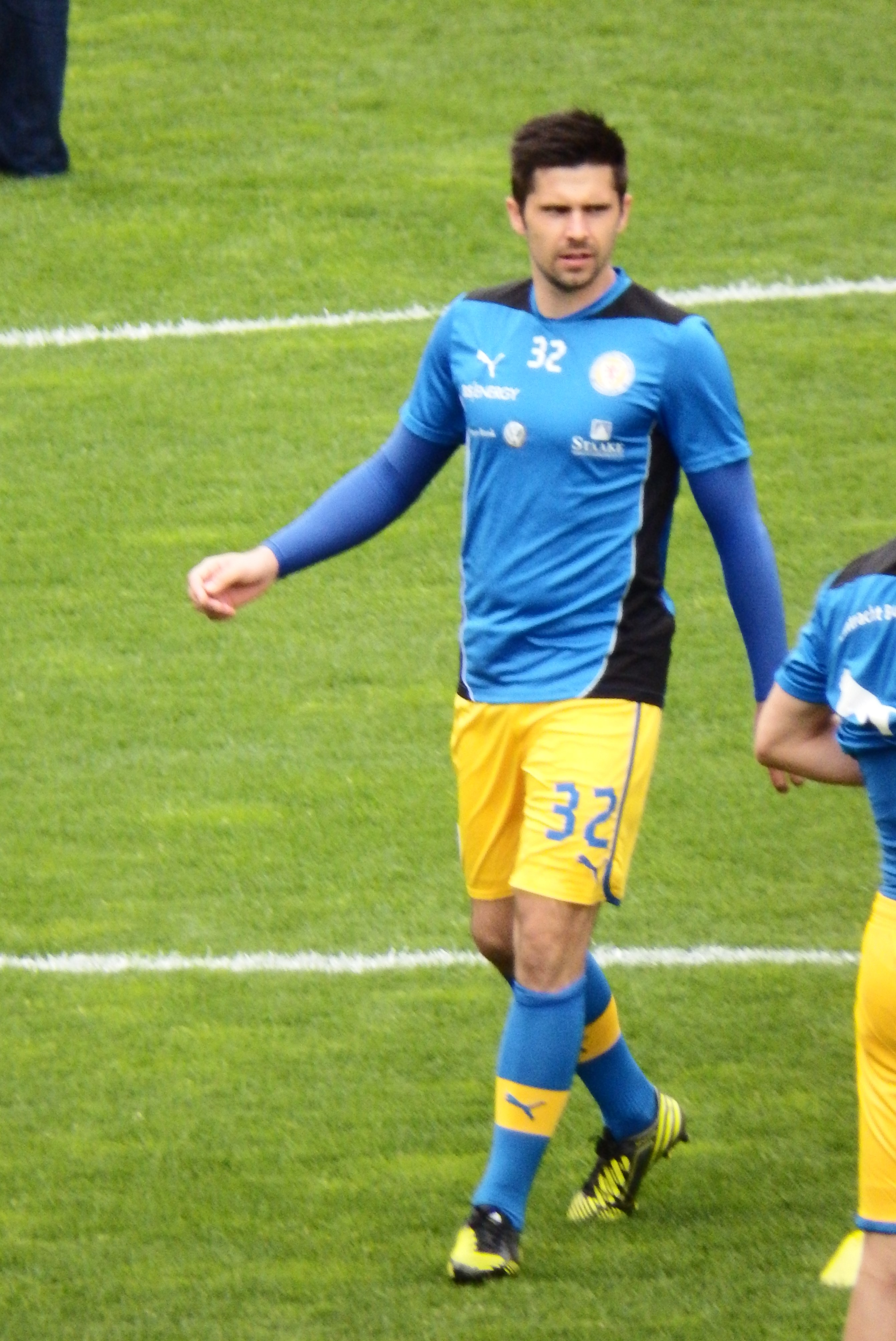
- Kruppke with Eintracht Braunschweig in 2013

Personal information
- Date of birth: 1 April 1980 (age 46)
- Place of birth: Münster, West Germany
- Height: 1.79 m (5 ft 10 in)
- Positions: Midfielder; forward

Youth career
- VfL Vorwerk
- SV Olympia Bad Schwartau
- –1995: FC Dornbreite Lübeck
- 1995–2000: VfB Lübeck

Senior career*
Years	Team	Apps	(Gls)
1995–2003	VfB Lübeck	83	(17)
2003–2007	SC Freiburg	85	(4)
2003–2007	SC Freiburg II	9	(1)
2007	→ VfB Lübeck (loan)	15	(7)
2008–2015	Eintracht Braunschweig	196	(61)
2008–2014	Eintracht Braunschweig II	3	(2)
Total		391	(92)
- * Club domestic league appearances and goals

Dennis Kruppke (born 1 April 1980) is a German former professional footballer who played as a midfielder or forward.

== Career ==
Kruppke was born in Münster. He joined the Bundesliga side SC Freiburg from VfB Lübeck in 2003. He made his debut in the German first-tier on 2 August 2003, in a match against Bayer Leverkusen.

He returned to Lübeck for a six-month loan in January 2007. After this loan he played again for SC Freiburg, but was transferred to Eintracht Braunschweig, then playing in the Regionalliga Nord, in January 2008. Kruppke went on to captain the team to promotions to the 2. Bundesliga in 2011 and the Bundesliga in 2013. After eight seasons with Braunschweig, he retired at the end of the 2014–15 season due to a knee injury.

== Honours ==
- Northern German Sportsperson of the Year (Nordsportler des Jahres): 2012
