= Karlo Kurányi =

Professional footballer

Personal information
- Date of birth: 27 September 2005 (age 21)
- Place of birth: Stuttgart, Germany
- Height: 1.93 m (6 ft 4 in)
- Position: Forward

Team information
- Current team: FC Astoria Walldorf
- Number: 22

Youth career
- –2016: SG Heidelberg-Kirchheim
- 2016–2022: Stuttgarter Kickers
- 2022–2024: VfB Stuttgart

Senior career*
Years	Team	Apps	(Gls)
2024	VfB Stuttgart II	0	(0)
2024–2025	VfB Stuttgart	0	(0)
2024–2025	→ FC 08 Villingen (loan)	30	(4)
2025–2026	SGV Freiberg	14	(0)
2026–	FC Astoria Walldorf	8	(3)

International career^{‡}
2025–	Panama U20	5	(0)
- * Club domestic league appearances and goals as of 24 September 2026 ‡ National team caps and goals as of 3 October 2025

Karlo Kurányi (born 27 September 2005) is a professional footballer who plays as a forward for FC Astoria Walldorf. Born in Germany, he is a Panama youth international.

== Early life ==
Kurányi was born on 27 September 2005 in Stuttgart, Germany. The son of Germany international Kevin Kurányi, he is of Panamanian, Brazilian, and Hungarian descent through his father, and Croatian descent through his mother.

== Club career ==
As a youth player, Kurányi joined the youth academy of German side SG Heidelberg-Kirchheim. Following his stint there, he joined the youth academy of German side Stuttgarter Kickers in 2016.

Ahead of the 2022–23 season, he joined the youth academy of German Bundesliga side VfB Stuttgart in 2022. In 2025, he was sent on loan to German side FC 08 Villingen, where he made thirty league appearances and scored four goals. Subsequently, he signed for German side SGV Freiberg in 2025.

== International career ==
Kurányi is a Panama youth international. During the summer of 2025, he played for the Panama national under-20 football team at the 2025 Maurice Revello Tournament.

== Style of play ==
Kurányi plays as a forward. German newspaper Bietigheimer Zeitung wrote in 2025 that he has "a similar stature and playing style to his father, his favorite territory is on the pitch in and around the opponent's penalty area".
