= Julius Düker =

German footballer

Personal information
- Full name: Julius Vincent Düker
- Date of birth: 4 January 1996 (age 30)
- Place of birth: Braunschweig, Germany
- Height: 1.87 m (6 ft 2 in)
- Position: Defensive midfielder

Team information
- Current team: SC Freiburg II
- Number: 8

Youth career
- TSV Sickte
- MTV Schandelah
- 2010–2012: VfL Wolfsburg
- 2012–2013: Braunschweiger SC Acosta
- 2013–2015: Eintracht Braunschweig

Senior career*
| Years | Team | Apps | (Gls) |
| 2014–2016 | Eintracht Braunschweig II | 24 | (5) |
| 2014–2016 | Eintracht Braunschweig | 17 | (0) |
| 2016–2018 | 1. FC Magdeburg | 46 | (6) |
| 2018–2019 | SC Paderborn | 6 | (1) |
| 2019 | → Eintracht Braunschweig (loan) | 10 | (3) |
| 2019–2021 | SV Meppen | 43 | (5) |
| 2021–2022 | TSV Havelse | 30 | (1) |
| 2022–2023 | Chennaiyin | 20 | (1) |
| 2023–2026 | TSV Havelse | 93 | (23) |
| 2026– | SC Freiburg II | 7 | (0) |
- * Club domestic league appearances and goals as of 24 September 2026

Julius Vincent Düker (born 4 January 1996) is a German professional footballer who plays as a defensive midfielder for SC Freiburg II.

== Career ==
=== Eintracht Braunschweig ===
Düker joined the U-19 side of Eintracht Braunschweig in 2013 from Acosta Braunschweig. He made his debut one year later for Eintracht Braunschweig II in the Regionalliga Nord. Shortly after, on the eighth matchday of the 2014–15 season, he made his professional debut for the senior team in the 2. Bundesliga, coming on in the 86th minute in a match against SV Sandhausen.

=== FC Magdeburg ===
In June 2016, Düker transferred to 3. Liga club FC Magdeburg.

=== SC Paderborn ===
He joined 2. Bundesliga club SC Paderborn in July 2018. On 31 December 2018, he returned to Eintracht Braunschweig on loan for the remainder of the season.

=== SV Meppen ===
Ahead of the 2019–20 season, he joined SV Meppen. He scored five goals in 43 matches league matches across two seasons for SV Meppen.

=== TSV Havelse ===
On 22 June 2021, he signed with newly promoted 3. Liga side TSV Havelse.

=== SC Freiburg II ===
Düker joined SC Freiburg II ahead of the 2026–27 season.

== Career statistics ==
=== Club ===
As of 19 April 2023

| Club | Season | League | | | Cup | | Continental | | Total | |
| Club | Season | Division | Apps | Goals | Apps | Goals | Apps | Goals | Apps | Goals |
|---|---|---|---|---|---|---|---|---|---|---|
| Eintracht Braunschweig II | 2014–15 | Regionalliga | 6 | 1 | 0 | 0 | — | | 6 | 1 |
| Eintracht Braunschweig II | 2015–16 | Regionalliga | 18 | 3 | 0 | 0 | — | | 18 | 3 |
| Eintracht Braunschweig II | Braunschweig II total | | 24 | 4 | 0 | 0 | 0 | 0 | 24 | 4 |
| Eintracht Braunschweig | 2014–15 | 2. Bundesliga | 9 | 0 | 1 (Note: Appearance(s) in DFB-Pokal) | 0 | — | | 10 | 0 |
| Eintracht Braunschweig | 2015–16 | 2. Bundesliga | 8 | 0 | 0 | 0 | — | | 8 | 0 |
| Eintracht Braunschweig | Braunschweig total | | 17 | 0 | 1 | 0 | 0 | 0 | 18 | 0 |
| 1. FC Magdeburg | 2016–17 | 3. Liga | 23 | 2 | 0 | 0 | — | | 23 | 2 |
| 1. FC Magdeburg | 2017–18 | 3. Liga | 23 | 4 | 1 | 0 | — | | 24 | 4 |
| 1. FC Magdeburg | Magdeburg total | | 46 | 6 | 1 | 0 | 0 | 0 | 47 | 6 |
| SC Paderborn | 2018–19 | 2. Bundesliga | 6 | 1 | 2 | 0 | — | | 8 | 1 |
| Eintracht Braunschweig (loan) | 2018–19 | 3. Liga | 10 | 3 | 0 | 0 | — | | 10 | 3 |
| SV Meppen | 2019–20 | 3. Liga | 31 | 5 | 0 | 0 | — | | 31 | 5 |
| SV Meppen | 2020–21 | 3. Liga | 12 | 0 | 0 | 0 | — | | 12 | 0 |
| SV Meppen | Meppen total | | 43 | 5 | 0 | 0 | 0 | 0 | 43 | 5 |
| TSV Havelse | 2021–22 | 3. Liga | 30 | 1 | 0 | 0 | — | | 30 | 1 |
| Chennaiyin | 2022–23 | Indian Super League | 20 | 1 | 8 (Note: Appearance(s) in Durand Cup) (Note: Appearances in the Super Cup) | 2 | — | | 28 | 3 |
| Career total | | | 196 | 21 | 12 | 2 | 0 | 0 | 208 | 23 |
