= Yannick Thermann =

German footballer

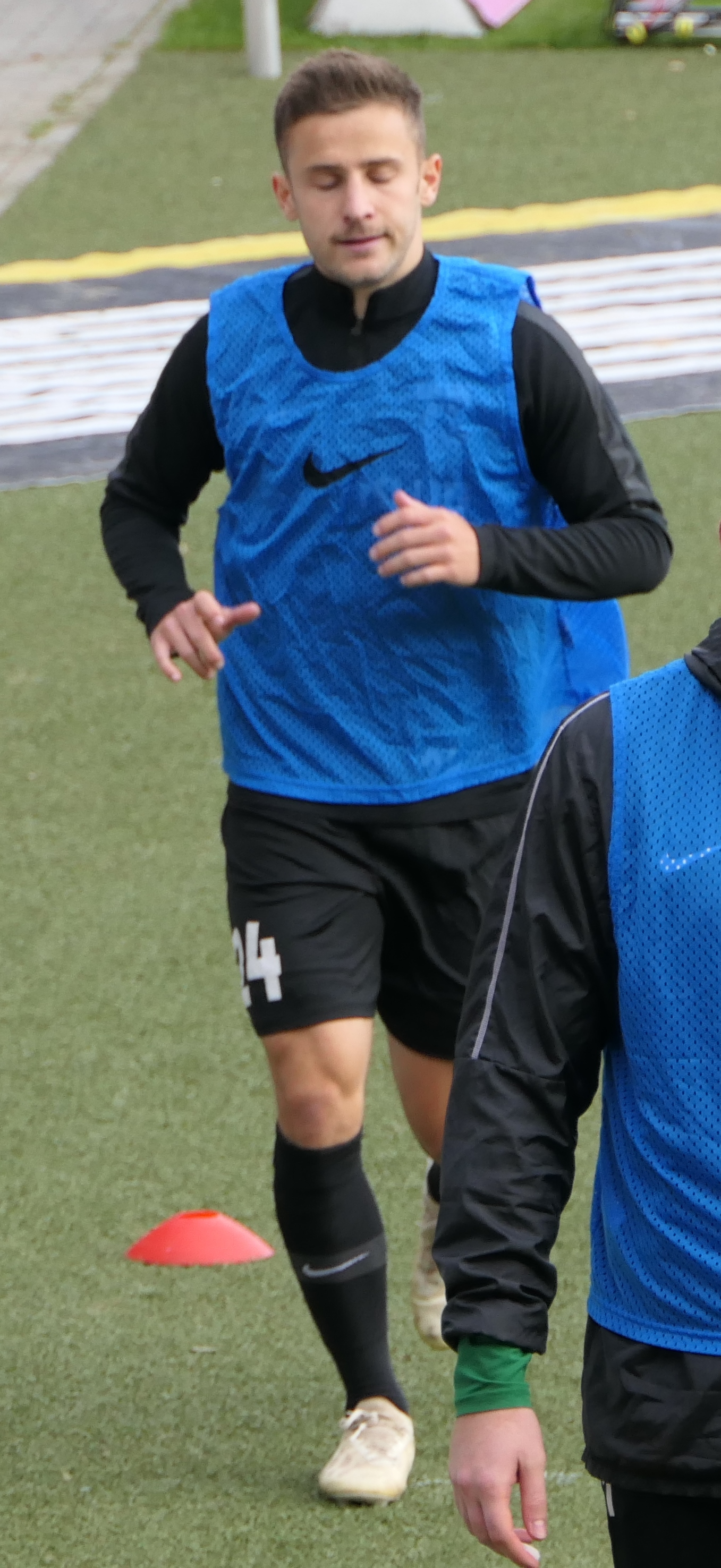

Personal information
- Date of birth: 8 February 1994 (age 32)
- Place of birth: Hanover, Germany
- Height: 1.68 m (5 ft 6 in)
- Position: Midfielder

Team information
- Current team: Astoria Walldorf
- Number: 24

Youth career
- DJK/FC Ziegelhausen-Peterstal
- –2013: 1899 Hoffenheim

Senior career*
Years	Team	Apps	(Gls)
2013–2016	1899 Hoffenheim II	78	(11)
2016–2017	Stuttgarter Kickers	25	(3)
2017–2019	Sonnenhof Großaspach	37	(2)
2020–2023	SGV Freiberg	69	(16)
2023–2024	VfR Aalen	30	(0)
2025–	Astoria Walldorf	42	(0)

International career
2013	Germany U19	1	(0)
- * Club domestic league appearances and goals as of 24 September 2026

Yannick Thermann (born 8 February 1994) is a German footballer who plays as a midfielder for Astoria Walldorf.
