= Deniz Sığa =

Turkish footballer

Personal information
- Date of birth: 1 February 1989 (age 37)
- Place of birth: Niğde, Turkey
- Height: 1.87 m (6 ft 2 in)
- Position: Forward

Team information
- Current team: OSC Bremerhaven

Youth career
- –2008: VfB Oldenburg

Senior career*
| Years | Team | Apps | (Gls) |
| 2008–2010 | 1. FC Magdeburg | 26 | (3) |
| 2008–2010 | 1. FC Magdeburg II | | |
| 2010–2011 | Rot-Weiß Erfurt II | | |
| 2010–2011 | Rot-Weiß Erfurt | 1 | (0) |
| 2011–2012 | Borussia Neunkirchen | | |
| 2012–2013 | Pendikspor | 8 | (2) |
| 2013 | → Siirtspor (loan) | 13 | (2) |
| 2013–2014 | Gölcükspor | 14 | (1) |
| 2014 | Denizli B.S.K. | 12 | (2) |
| 2014–2015 | 24 Erzincanspor | 13 | (0) |
| 2015 | Yozgatspor | | |
| 2015–2016 | FSV Salmrohr | 22 | (1) |
| 2015–2016 | FSV Salmrohr II | | |
| 2016–2019 | SV Rot-Weiss Wittlich | | |
| 2019–2020 | FC Bitburg | | |
| 2020–2021 | Borussia Neunkirchen | | |
| 2021– | OSC Bremerhaven | 43 | (8) |

International career
| | Turkey U18 | 4 | (0) |
- * Club domestic league appearances and goals as of 1 July 2024

Deniz Sığa (born 1 February 1989) is a Turkish footballer who plays as a forward for OSC Bremerhaven.
