= Nico Hammann =

German footballer

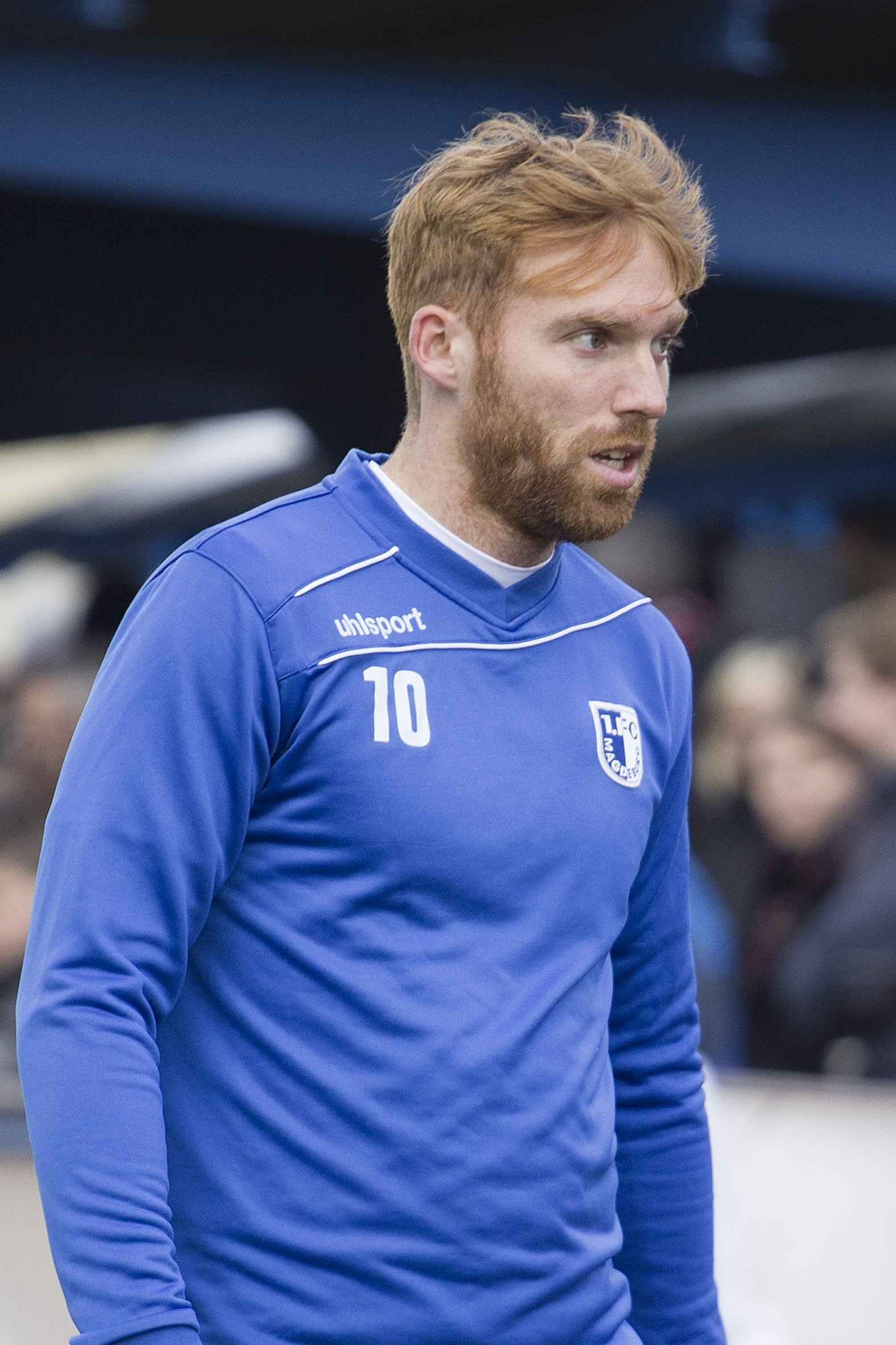

Personal information
- Date of birth: 16 March 1988 (age 38)
- Place of birth: Eberbach, West Germany
- Height: 1.87 m (6 ft 2 in)
- Positions: Midfielder; full-back

Team information
- Current team: SV Unter-Flockenbach
- Number: 23

Youth career
- SG Wald-Michelbach
- SV Affolterbach
- –2007: 1899 Hoffenheim

Senior career*
| Years | Team | Apps | (Gls) |
| 2007–2008 | 1899 Hoffenheim II | 25 | (3) |
| 2008–2010 | 1860 Munich II | 46 | (8) |
| 2010–2011 | 1. FC Kaiserslautern II | 33 | (9) |
| 2011–2012 | Arminia Bielefeld | 4 | (0) |
| 2012–2013 | Hessen Kassel | 38 | (2) |
| 2013–2015 | 1. FC Magdeburg | 61 | (22) |
| 2015–2016 | SV Sandhausen | 3 | (0) |
| 2016–2019 | 1. FC Magdeburg | 91 | (3) |
| 2019–2020 | Carl Zeiss Jena | 30 | (2) |
| 2020–2021 | Astoria Walldorf | 37 | (8) |
| 2021– | SV Unter-Flockenbach | 50 | (18) |
- * Club domestic league appearances and goals as of 12 November 2022

Nico Hammann (born 16 March 1988) is a German professional footballer who plays for Hessenliga club SV Unter-Flockenbach as a midfielder or full-back.
