= Kosta Rodrigues =

German footballer

Personal information
- Full name: Konstantinos Elvis Rodrigues
- Date of birth: 12 August 1979 (age 47)
- Place of birth: Rüsselsheim, West Germany
- Height: 1.70 m (5 ft 7 in)
- Position: Midfielder

Youth career
- 1988–1991: Eintracht Rüsselsheim
- 1991–1996: Eintracht Frankfurt
- 1996–1998: VfB Stuttgart

Senior career*
Years	Team	Apps	(Gls)
1998–1999	SC Weismain	23	(0)
1999–2002	Eintracht Braunschweig	73	(5)
2002–2003	Hannover 96	0	(0)
2002–2003	→ 1. FC Saarbrücken (loan)	26	(2)
2003	1. FC Saarbrücken	9	(0)
2003	→ 1. FC Saarbrücken II	3	(1)
2004–2009	Eintracht Braunschweig	160	(6)
2007–2008	→ Eintracht Braunschweig II	2	(0)
2010–2011	Wuppertaler SV	14	(0)
2011–2012	1. FC Magdeburg	30	(0)
2011	→ 1. FC Magdeburg II	1	(0)
2012–2014	SSV Kästorf		

Managerial career
- 2014–: Eintracht Braunschweig (youth)
- * Club domestic league appearances and goals as of 24 February 2014

Kosta Rodrigues (born 12 August 1979 in Rüsselsheim) is a retired German footballer who last played professionally for 1. FC Magdeburg. Before joining Magdeburg he spent most of his career with Eintracht Braunschweig, including two seasons in the 2. Bundesliga.

After retiring from professional football, Rodrigues became a youth coach at Eintracht Braunschweig.
