= FC-Astoria Walldorf =

Association football club

- Full name: Fußball-Club-Astoria Walldorf e.V.
- Founded: 15 February 1995
- Ground: Stadion im Dietmar-Hopp-Sportpark
- Capacity: 5,000
- Chairman: Wilhelm Kempf
- Manager: Andreas Schön
- League: Regionalliga Südwest (IV)
- 2025–26: Regionalliga Südwest, 12th of 18
- Website: https://fcastoria.de/
Home colours	Away colours

FC-Astoria Walldorf is a German association football club from the town of Walldorf, Baden-Württemberg.

The club is named after John Jacob Astor, who was born in Walldorf in 1763 and later emigrated to the United States where he became a successful businessman. His descendants, founders of the Waldorf-Astoria Hotel, generously supported the town of Walldorf and the new football club, formed in 1908, was named Astoria in his honour.

== History ==
The club was formed on 15 February 1995 through the union of the 1. FC 08 Walldorf and the football department of SG Walldorf Astoria 02. The new club advanced to the Verbandsliga Nordbaden (V) in 2001. Winning the Verbandsliga in 2007, the club was promoted to the Oberliga Baden-Württemberg.

Like TSG 1899 Hoffenheim the club is supported by Dietmar Hopp, the founder of software maker SAP. Hopp initiated negotiations to merge FC Astoria Walldorf, TSG Hoffenheim, and SV Sandhausen to create FC Heidelberg 06 with the long-term objective of reaching the Bundesliga, Germany's first division league. The talks were abandoned in 2005 due to the resistance of the latter two clubs, and the failure to agree on whether the new side's stadium should be located in Heidelberg or Eppelheim.

A North Baden Cup win in 2013–14 earned the club the right to enter the first round of the 2014–15 DFB-Pokal, the German Cup, for the first time. In the same season the club also won the Oberliga title and earned promotion to the tier four Regionalliga Südwest for the first time.

== Honours ==
The club's honours:

=== League ===
- Oberliga Baden-Württemberg (V)
  - Champions: 2014
  - Runners-up: 2010, 2013
- Verbandsliga Baden (V)
  - Champions: 2007, 2016

=== Cup ===
- Baden Cup
  - Winners: 2014, 2016, 2023

== Current squad ==
As of 8 September 2026

Note: Flags indicate national team as defined under FIFA eligibility rules; some limited exceptions apply. Players may hold more than one non-FIFA nationality.

No.	Pos.	Nation	Player
1	GK	GER	Michel Witte
2	DF	GER	Maik Goß
5	DF	GER	Roman Hauk
7	MF	GER	Tim Fahrenholz
8	DF	GER	Lennart Grimmer
9	FW	GER	Marcel Carl
10	MF	GER	Maximilian Waack
11	FW	GER	Felix Kendel
12	DF	GER	Bennet Schieber
13	MF	GER	Emilian Lässig
14	FW	GER	Konrad Riehle
17	MF	GER	Theodoros Politakis

No.	Pos.	Nation	Player
19	FW	GER	Baton Hajrizaj
20	MF	CRO	Matej Mijić
22	FW	PAN	Karlo Kurányi
23	FW	GER	Samuel Wetter
24	DF	GER	Yannick Thermann
25	MF	GRE	Iosif Maroudis
29	DF	GER	Marvin Mutz
30	MF	GER	Kenny Freßle
32	GK	GER	Jack Hillenbrand
33	GK	AUT	Mario Schragl
38	MF	GER	Arion Erbe
39	FW	GER	Tino Kaufmann

== Recent managers ==
Recent managers of the club:

Manager	Start	Finish
Roland Dickgießer	1 July 2007	30 August 2011
Thomas Erlein		
Guido Streichsbier	2 October 2011	30 June 2014
Matthias Born	1 July 2014	Present

== Recent seasons ==
The recent season-by-season performance of the club:

=== FC Astoria Walldorf ===
Season	Division	Tier	Position
2000–01	Landesliga Nordbaden	VI	
2001–02	Verbandsliga Nordbaden	V	6th
2002–03	Verbandsliga Nordbaden	V	3rd
2003–04	Verbandsliga Nordbaden	V	4th
2004–05	Verbandsliga Nordbaden	V	8th
2005–06	Verbandsliga Nordbaden	V	5th
2006–07	Verbandsliga Nordbaden	V	1st ↑
2007–08	Oberliga Baden-Württemberg	IV	8th
2008–09	Oberliga Baden-Württemberg	V	4th
2009–10	Oberliga Baden-Württemberg	V	2nd
2010–11	Oberliga Baden-Württemberg	V	8th
2011–12	Oberliga Baden-Württemberg	V	7th
2012–13	Oberliga Baden-Württemberg	V	2nd
2013–14	Oberliga Baden-Württemberg	V	1st ↑
2014–15	Regionalliga Südwest	IV	8th
2015–16	Regionalliga Südwest	IV	11th
2016–17	Regionalliga Südwest	IV	11th
2017–18	Regionalliga Südwest	IV	11th
2018–19	Regionalliga Südwest	IV	13th
2019–20 (Note: Season curtailed due to COVID-19 pandemic in Germany)	Regionalliga Südwest	IV	5th
2020–21	Regionalliga Südwest	IV	18th
2021–22	Regionalliga Südwest	IV	10th
2022–23	Regionalliga Südwest	IV	12th
2023–24	Regionalliga Südwest	IV	
2024–25	Regionalliga Südwest	IV	11th
2025–26	Regionalliga Südwest	IV	12th

=== FC Astoria Walldorf II ===
Season	Division	Tier	Position
2000–01			
2001–02			
2002–03			
2003–04			
2004–05	Kreisliga B Heidelberg-Süd	VIII	5th
2005–06	Kreisklasse A Heidelberg	VIII	8th
2006–07	Kreisklasse A Heidelberg	VIII	1st ↑
2007–08	Kreisliga Heidelberg	VII	1st ↑
2008–09	Landesliga Rhein-Neckar	VII	1st ↑
2009–10	Verbandsliga Baden	VI	11th
2010–11	Verbandsliga Baden	VI	5th
2011–12	Verbandsliga Baden	VI	4th
2012–13	Verbandsliga Baden	VI	6th
2013–14	Verbandsliga Baden	VI	2nd
2014–15	Verbandsliga Baden	VI	3rd
2015–16	Verbandsliga Baden	VI	1st ↑
2016–17	Oberliga Baden-Württemberg	V	15th
2017–18	Oberliga Baden-Württemberg	V	17th ↓
2018–19	Verbandsliga Baden	VI	5th
2019–20	Verbandsliga Baden	VI	1st ↑
2020–21	Oberliga Baden-Württemberg	V	19th
2021–22	Oberliga Baden-Württemberg	V	16th
2022–23	Oberliga Baden-Württemberg	V	16th ↓
2023–24	Verbandsliga Baden	VI	

- With the introduction of the Regionalligas in 1994 and the 3. Liga in 2008 as the new third tier, below the 2. Bundesliga, all leagues below dropped one tier.

=== Key ===
↑ Promoted	↓ Relegated

== Stadium ==
FC Astoria Walldorf plays its home matches in the FC-Astoria stadium which features a natural turf field and two artificial turf fields. During the 2006 World Cup the facility was used as the training ground of the Costa Rican national side.
