= Maximilian Watzka =

German retired football player (born 1986)

Personal information
- Date of birth: 25 May 1986 (age 40)
- Place of birth: Leipzig, East Germany
- Height: 1.81 m (5 ft 11 in)
- Position: Midfielder

Youth career
- 1991–2004: VfB Leipzig

Senior career*
Years	Team	Apps	(Gls)
2003–2004	VfB Leipzig	1	(0)
2004–2007	Sachsen Leipzig	76	(9)
2007–2008	Kickers Offenbach	13	(0)
2008–2010	1. FC Magdeburg	62	(14)
2010–2012	RB Leipzig	20	(2)
2012–2013	Eintracht Trier	29	(3)
2013–2017	Viktoria Berlin	90	(21)
2017–2018	Progrès Niederkorn	30	(4)
Total		321	(53)
- * Club domestic league appearances and goals

Maximilian Watzka (born 25 May 1986) is a German former professional football player.

== Career ==
Watzka began his career in the youth department of his home town club VfB Leipzig. In 2004, he moved to local rivals FC Sachsen Leipzig where he played in 76 NOFV-Oberliga Süd matches, scoring 9 goals. He also played in a match in the DFB-Pokal in 2005.

For the 2007–08 season, Watzka signed a professional contract with then-2nd Bundesliga side Kickers Offenbach. However, he only played in 13 matches, mostly as a substitute, and only was on the pitch for an average 20 minutes. He did not score any goals. Here he also played in one DFB-Pokal match.

After his rather disappointing spell at Offenbach Watzka moved to Regionalliga Nord side 1. FC Magdeburg where he quickly established himself as a first team regular. He played in all but one match and spent an average of 81 minutes on the pitch.
