= Rüdiger Naumann =

German footballer

Personal information
- Date of birth: 11 December 1960 (age 65)
- Position: Midfielder

Senior career*
Years	Team	Apps	(Gls)
1978–1984	1. FC Magdeburg II		
1981–1982	1. FC Magdeburg		
1984–1990	ASG Vorwärts Dessau		
1989	→ Motor Schönebeck		
1990–1991	Schönebecker SV		
- * Club domestic league appearances and goals

Rüdiger Naumann (born 11 December 1960) is a retired German football midfielder.
