= Christopher Handke =

German footballer

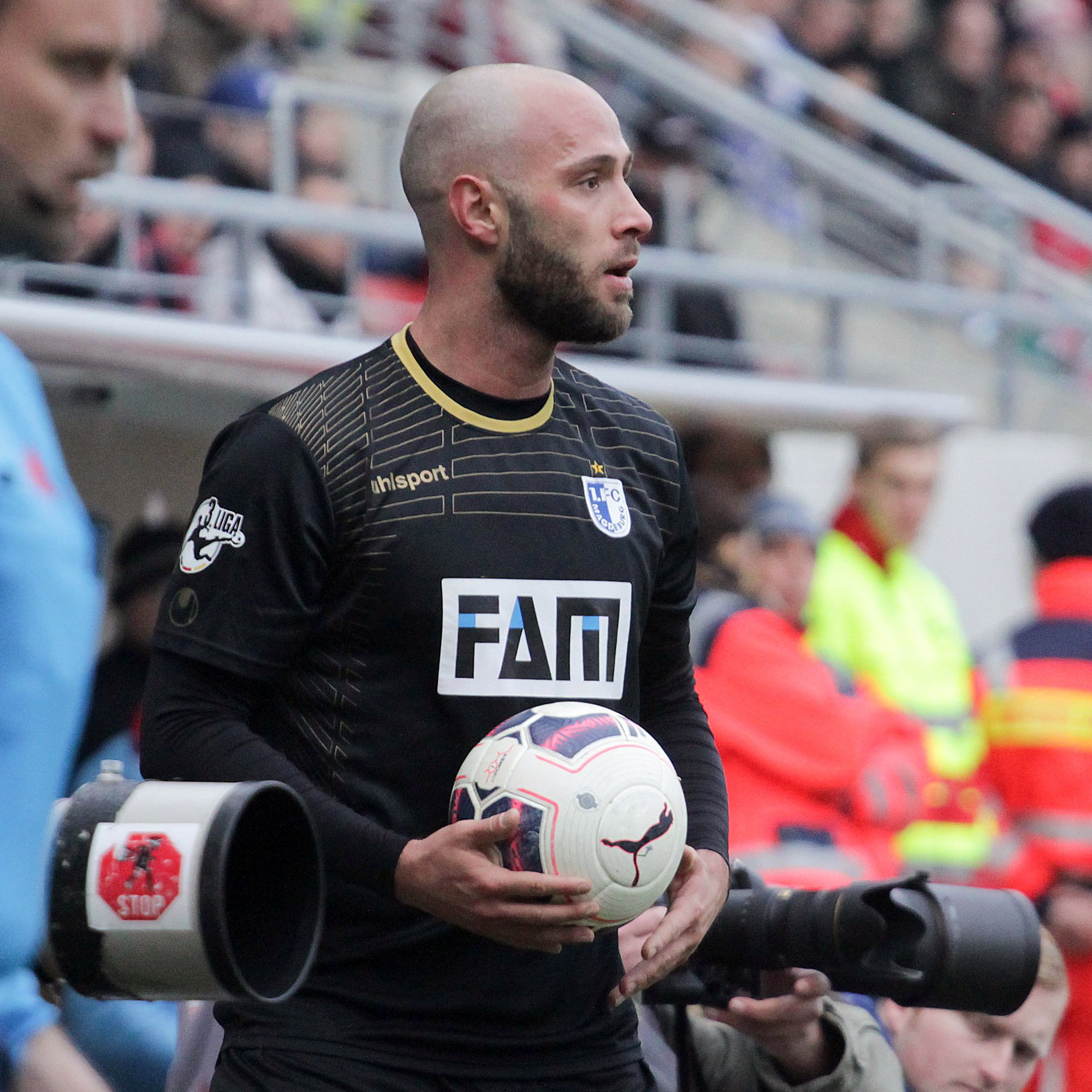

Personal information
- Date of birth: 14 February 1989 (age 37)
- Place of birth: Bad Frankenhausen, East Germany
- Height: 1.91 m (6 ft 3 in)
- Position: Centre back

Team information
- Current team: Ummendorfer SV

Youth career
- –2004: SV Blau-Weiß 91 Bad Frankenhausen
- 2004–2008: Rot-Weiß Erfurt

Senior career*
Years	Team	Apps	(Gls)
2008–2011	Rot-Weiß Erfurt II	63	(7)
2009–2011	Rot-Weiß Erfurt	7	(0)
2011–2013	VfB Germania Halberstadt	51	(1)
2013–2019	1. FC Magdeburg	146	(4)
2019–2020	FSV Zwickau	19	(0)
2020–	Ummendorfer SV		
- * Club domestic league appearances and goals as of 4 July 2020

Christopher Handke (born 14 February 1989) is a German professional footballer who plays for Ummendorfer SV.

== Career ==
Born in Bad Frankenhausen, Handke made his professional debut for Rot-Weiß Erfurt during the 2008–09 3. Liga season against Paderborn 07.

On 4 May 2016, Handke extended his contract with 1. FC Magdeburg until 2017.

== Career statistics ==
As of match played 1 July 2019

Appearances and goals by club, season and competition
Club	Season	League			DFB-Pokal		Total	
Club	Season	Division	Apps	Goals	Apps	Goals	Apps	Goals
Rot-Weiß Erfurt	2008–09	3. Liga	1	0	0	0	1	0
Rot-Weiß Erfurt	2009–10	3. Liga	5	0	0	0	5	0
Rot-Weiß Erfurt	2010–11	3. Liga	1	0	—		1	0
Rot-Weiß Erfurt	Total		7	0	0	0	7	0
Germania Halberstadt	2011–12	Regionalliga Nordost	25	0	—		25	0
Germania Halberstadt	2012–13	Regionalliga Nordost	26	1	—		26	1
Germania Halberstadt	Total		51	1	0	0	51	1
1. FC Magdeburg	2013–14	Regionalliga Nordost	26	0	1	0	27	0
1. FC Magdeburg	2014–15	Regionalliga Nordost	18	0	1	0	19	0
1. FC Magdeburg	2015–16	3. Liga	30	0	—		30	0
1. FC Magdeburg	2016–17	3. Liga	33	1	1	0	34	1
1. FC Magdeburg	2017–18	3. Liga	32	2	2	0	34	2
1. FC Magdeburg	2018–19	2. Bundesliga	7	1	1	0	8	1
1. FC Magdeburg	Total		146	4	6	0	152	4
Career total			204	5	6	0	210	5
