= Björn Rother =

German footballer

Personal information
- Date of birth: 29 July 1996 (age 30)
- Place of birth: Stolberg, Germany
- Height: 1.85 m (6 ft 1 in)
- Position: Defensive midfielder

Team information
- Current team: FC Gütersloh
- Number: 6

Youth career
- TSV Hertha Walheim
- –2013: Alemannia Aachen
- 2013–2015: Bayer Leverkusen

Senior career*
Years	Team	Apps	(Gls)
2015–2017	Werder Bremen II	49	(2)
2017–2020	1. FC Magdeburg	80	(5)
2020–2022	Hansa Rostock	41	(2)
2022–2024	Rot-Weiss Essen	45	(2)
2024–	FC Gütersloh	44	(3)
- * Club domestic league appearances and goals as of 23 September 2026

Björn Rother (born 29 July 1996) is a German professional footballer who plays as defensive midfielder for FC Gütersloh.

== Career ==
In his youth, Rother played for TSV Hertha Walheim, Alemannia Aachen, and Bayer Leverkusen.

In the summer of 2015 he moved from the U19 of Leverkusen to the Werder Bremen reserves, playing in the 3. Liga. He made his debut on 5 September 2015, in the 3–1 defeat to Preußen Münster. He finished the 2016–17 season making 28 appearances and scoring one goal. On 2 June 2017, 3. Liga rivals 1. FC Magdeburg announced the signing of Rother on a two-year contract.

In June 2022 it was announced that Rother would join Rot-Weiss Essen, newly promoted to the 3. Liga, for the 2022–23 season. He moved on a free transfer from Hansa Rostock.

On 25 September 2024, Rother joined FC Gütersloh.
