= Dennis Erdmann =

German footballer (born 1990)

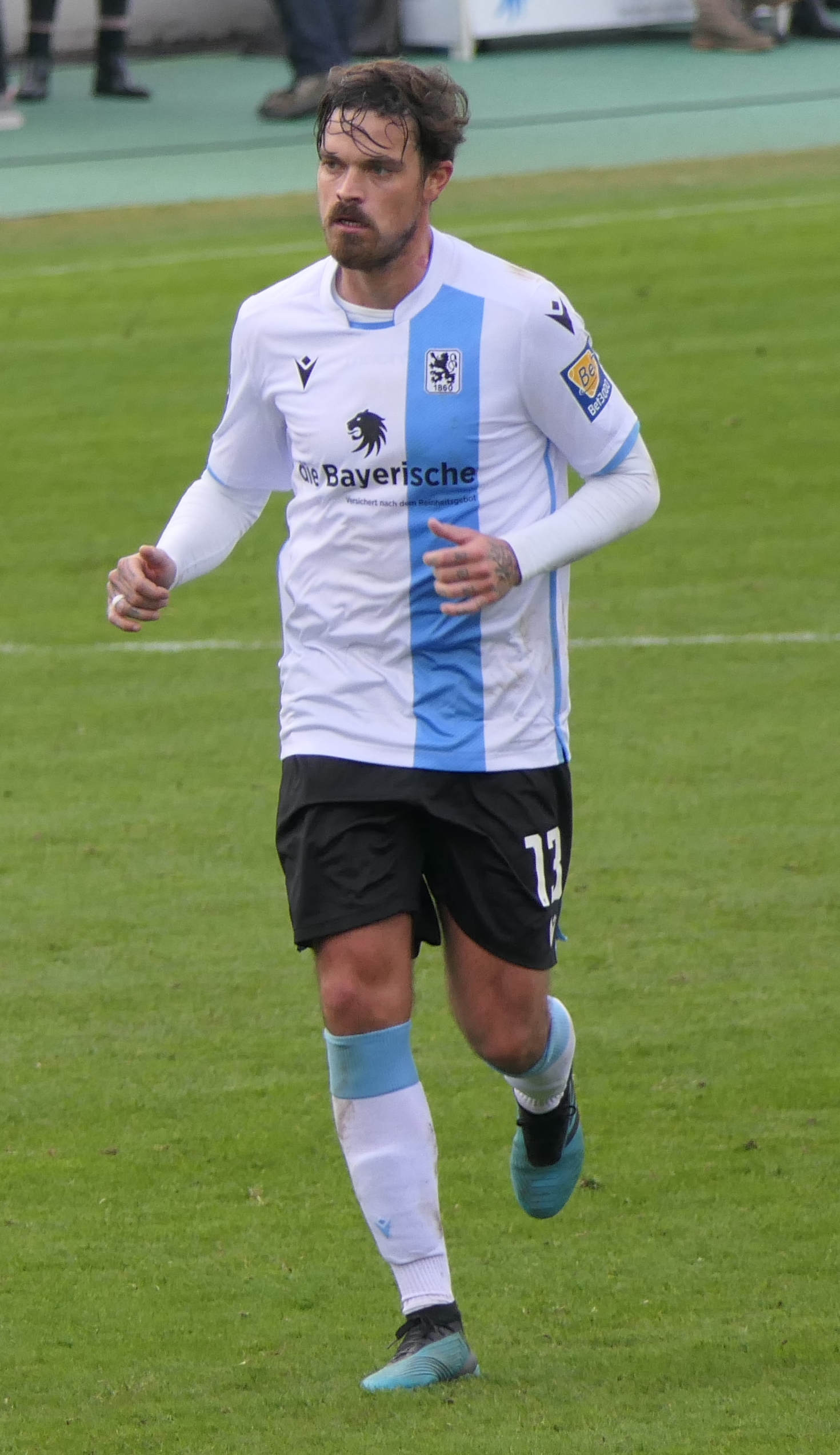
- Erdmann in 2020

Personal information
- Date of birth: 22 November 1990 (age 35)
- Place of birth: Kerpen, Germany
- Height: 1.88 m (6 ft 2 in)
- Positions: Defensive midfielder; centre back

Youth career
- –2006: SpVgg BBT
- 2006–2009: Blau-Weiß Kerpen
- 2009–2011: SC Brühl

Senior career*
Years	Team	Apps	(Gls)
2011–2012	SSG Bergisch Gladbach	36	(6)
2012–2014	Schalke 04 II	55	(4)
2014–2015	Dynamo Dresden	24	(1)
2015–2017	Hansa Rostock	64	(3)
2017–2019	1. FC Magdeburg	56	(2)
2019–2021	1860 Munich	59	(3)
2021–2022	1. FC Saarbrücken	9	(0)
2022–2023	Colorado Springs Switchbacks	24	(0)
2024	El Paso Locomotive	0	(0)
- * Club domestic league appearances and goals

Dennis Erdmann (born 22 November 1990) is a German professional footballer who plays as a defensive midfielder or centre back.

== Career ==
In June 2019, Erdmann joined TSV 1860 Munich on a two-year contract.

On 18 July 2021, he joined 1. FC Saarbrücken on a free transfer.

On 5 January 2022, Erdmann moved to the United States and signed with Colorado Springs Switchbacks.

On 31 July 2024, Erdmann signed with El Paso Locomotive FC.

On 25 November 2024, El Paso announced Erdmann was out of contract and would not return for the 2025 season.
