= Michel Niemeyer =

German footballer (born 1995)

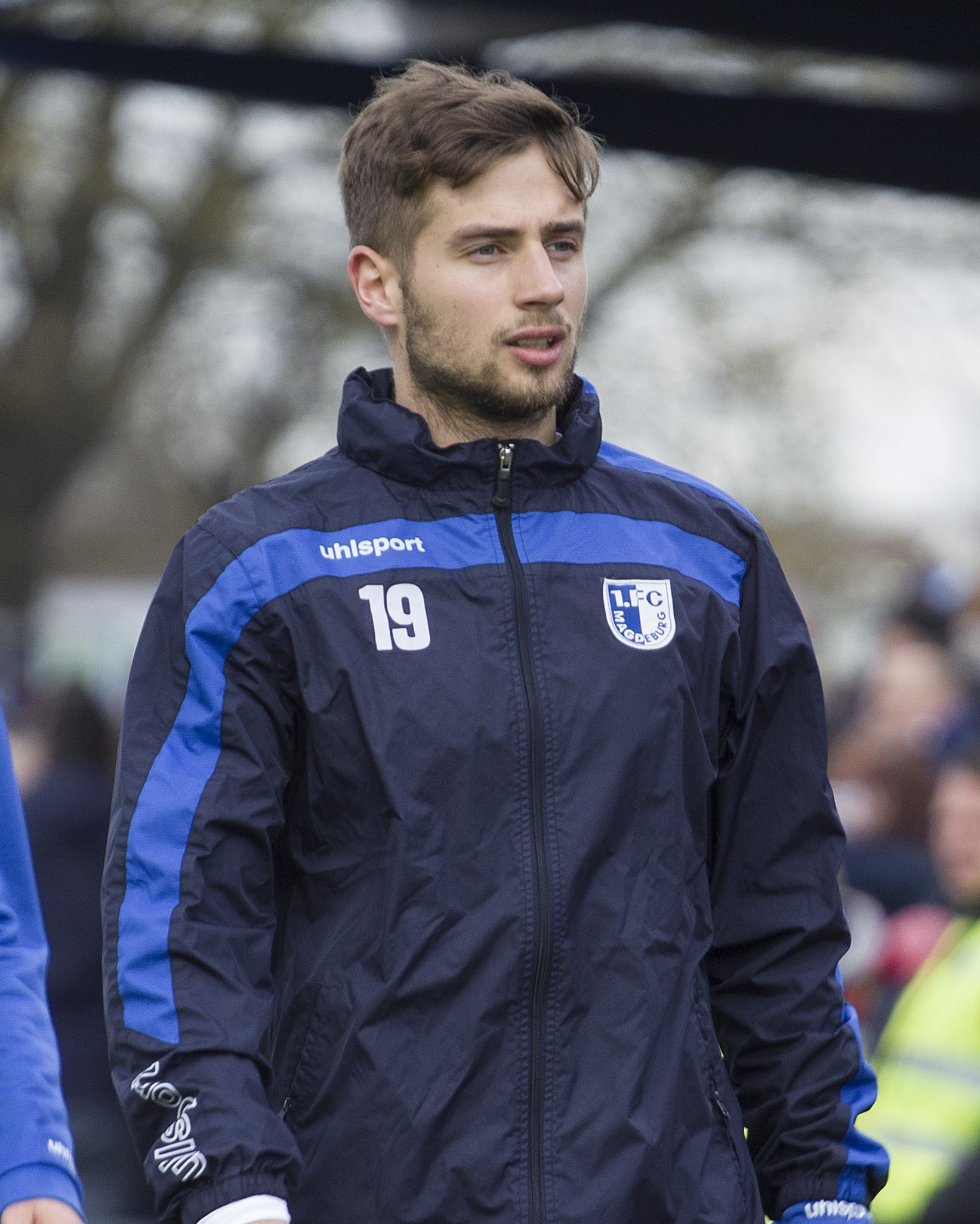
- Niemeyer with 1. FC Magdeburg

Personal information
- Date of birth: 19 November 1995 (age 30)
- Place of birth: Salzwedel, Saxony-Anhalt, Germany
- Height: 1.78 m (5 ft 10 in)
- Position: Midfielder

Team information
- Current team: Rot-Weiß Oberhausen
- Number: 29

Youth career
- –2008: SV Eintracht Salzwedel
- 2008–2013: 1. FC Magdeburg
- 2013–2014: RB Leipzig

Senior career*
Years	Team	Apps	(Gls)
2014–2015	RB Leipzig II	28	(0)
2015–2019	1. FC Magdeburg	80	(10)
2019–2021	Wehen Wiesbaden	34	(0)
2021–2023	Rot-Weiss Essen	6	(0)
2023–	Rot-Weiß Oberhausen	63	(2)
- * Club domestic league appearances and goals as of 23 September 2026

Michel Niemeyer (born 19 November 1995) is a German professional footballer who plays as a midfielder for Rot-Weiß Oberhausen.

== Career ==
Niemeyer was born in Salzwedel in Northeast Saxony-Anhalt and began playing football for his home-town club of SV Eintracht Salzwedel before moving on to 1. FC Magdeburg in 2008. He joined the Under 19 team of RB Leipzig in 2013. From 2014 he also played for the reserve team of that club, winning promotion to the Regionalliga Nordost in 2015.

However, he returned to 1. FC Magdeburg that summer, joining his former youth coach Jens Härtel who had signed as Magdeburg's manager a year earlier. He signed a contract until June 2017. He made his professional debut as a leftback in Magdeburg's 2–1 victory over Rot-Weiß Erfurt in the season opener of the 2015–16 3. Liga season.

On 21 May 2019, it was confirmed, that Niemeyer had joined SV Wehen Wiesbaden from the upcoming 2019–20 season on a two-year deal.

On 26 July 2023, Niemeyer signed with Rot-Weiß Oberhausen in Regionalliga West.
