= Eddy Vorm =

Dutch footballer

Personal information
- Date of birth: 4 June 1989 (age 37)
- Place of birth: Nieuwegein, Netherlands
- Height: 1.85 m (6 ft 1 in)
- Position: Forward

Senior career*
Years	Team	Apps	(Gls)
2008–2010	RKC Waalwijk	8	(0)
2010	1. FC Magdeburg	12	(1)
- * Club domestic league appearances and goals

Eddy Vorm (born 4 June 1989 in Nieuwegein) is a Dutch former footballer who made his Eerste Divisie league debut for club RKC Waalwijk during the 2008-2009 season.
