= Felix Schiller =

German footballer

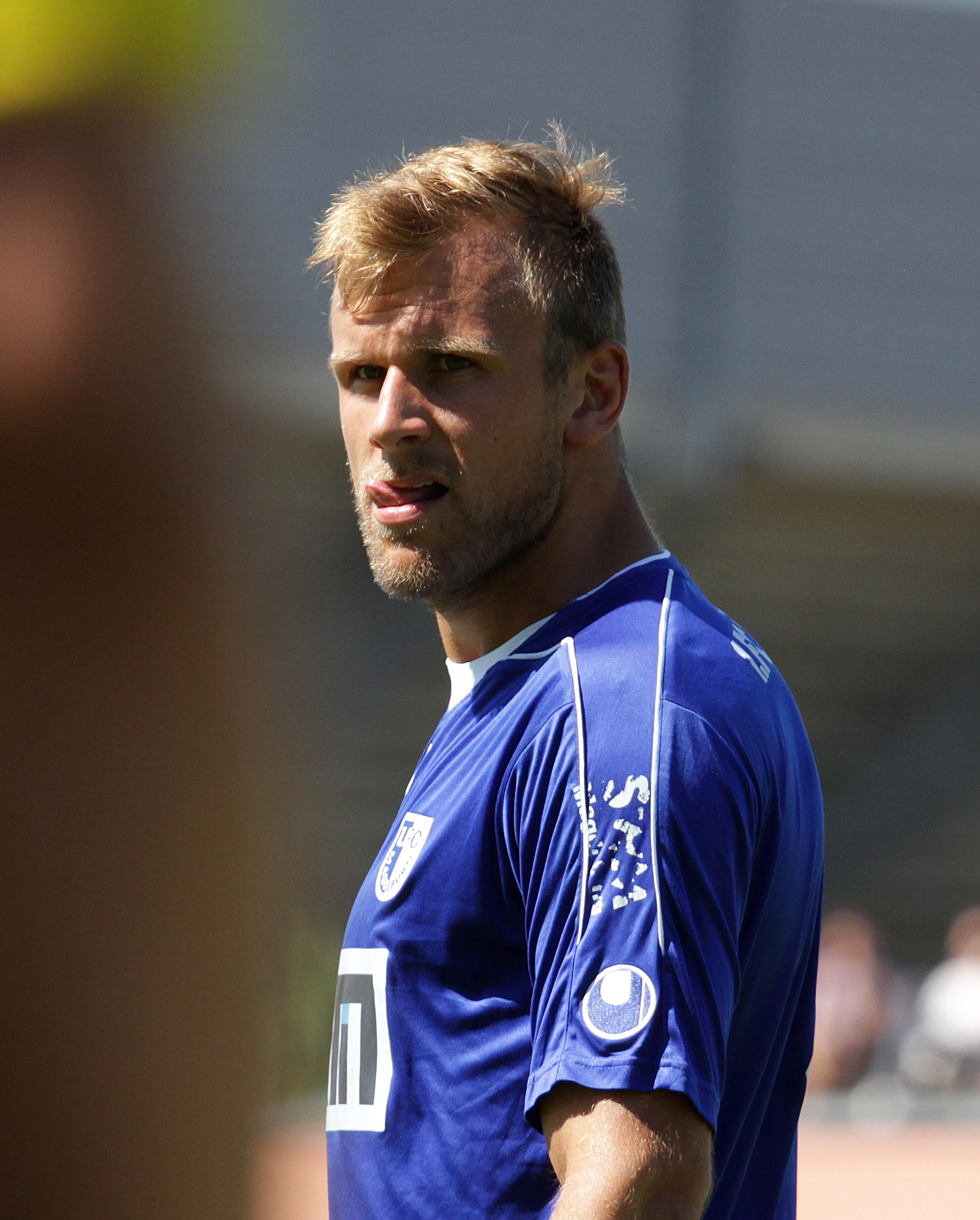
- Schiller in 2015

Personal information
- Full name: Felix Schiller
- Date of birth: 6 December 1989 (age 36)
- Place of birth: Berlin, Germany
- Height: 1.88 m (6 ft 2 in)
- Position: Defender

Youth career
- 2001–2005: Tasmania-Gropiusstadt 1973
- 2005–2008: Werder Bremen

Senior career*
Years	Team	Apps	(Gls)
2008–2011	Werder Bremen II	48	(0)
2011–2012	Rot-Weiß Oberhausen	30	(1)
2012–2018	1. FC Magdeburg	94	(8)
2018–2019	VfL Osnabrück	8	(0)
Total		180	(9)
- * Club domestic league appearances and goals

Felix Schiller (born 6 December 1989) is a German former professional footballer who played as a defender.

== Career ==
Born in Berlin, Schiller made his professional debut for SV Werder Bremen II during the 2008–09 3. Liga season as a substitute for Finn Holsing in a 1–1 home draw with Dynamo Dresden.

In the summer of 2011, Schiller moved to Rot-Weiß Oberhausen in the 3. Liga.

After a stint at Rot-Weiß Oberhausen where was a first-team regular, Schiller joined Regionalliga Nordost side 1. FC Magdeburg during the 2012–13 season.

In September 2018, Schiller missed three matches due to knee problems. On 23 January 2019, it was reported his knee injury required surgery. A week later Schiller announced his immediate retirement at the age of 29. He agreed the termination of his contract with VfL Osnabrück.

== Personal life ==
Following his retirement from football, Schiller studied to become a teacher.
