= 2014–15 DFB-Pokal =

Tournament details
- Country: Germany
- Venue(s): Olympiastadion
- Teams: 64

Final positions
- Champions: VfL Wolfsburg (1st title)
- Runner-up: Borussia Dortmund

Tournament statistics
- Matches played: 63
- Goals scored: 196 (3.11 per match)
- Attendance: 1,306,563 (20,739 per match)
- Top goal scorer(s): Sven Schipplock; Stefan Kießling (6 goals each)
- Goals scored in penalty shoot-outs not included.

The 2014–15 DFB-Pokal was the 72nd season of the annual German football cup competition. It began on 15 August 2014 with the first of six rounds and ended on 30 May 2015 with the final at the Olympiastadion in Berlin.

Bayern Munich was the two-time defending champions, having defeated Borussia Dortmund in the 2014 final, but were knocked out in the semi-finals by the same team in a penalty shootout.

VfL Wolfsburg won the final against Dortmund 3–1 to win their first title.

== Participating clubs ==
The following 64 teams qualified for the competition:

2013–14 Bundesliga all clubs	2013–14 2. Bundesliga all clubs	2013–14 3. Liga best four teams
1899 Hoffenheim; FC Augsburg; Bayer Leverkusen; Bayern Munich; Borussia Dortmund; Borussia Mönchengladbach; Eintracht Braunschweig; Eintracht Frankfurt; SC Freiburg; Hamburger SV; Hannover 96; Hertha BSC; Mainz 05; 1. FC Nürnberg; Schalke 04; VfB Stuttgart; Werder Bremen; VfL Wolfsburg	1860 Munich; VfR Aalen; Arminia Bielefeld; VfL Bochum; Dynamo Dresden; Fortuna Düsseldorf; Energie Cottbus; Erzgebirge Aue; FSV Frankfurt; Greuther Fürth; FC Ingolstadt; Karlsruher SC; 1. FC Kaiserslautern; 1. FC Köln; SC Paderborn; SV Sandhausen; FC St. Pauli; Union Berlin	1. FC Heidenheim; RB Leipzig; SV Darmstadt 98; SV Wehen Wiesbaden
24 representatives of regional associations, qualified through the 2013–14 Verbandspokale^{1}
North Baden Cup finalists: FC Astoria Walldorf; Bavarian Cup winners^{1}: Würzburger Kickers; 2nd Regionalliga Bayern 2013–14: FV Illertissen^{1,3}; Berlin Cup winners: FC Viktoria 1889 Berlin; Brandenburg Cup winners: FSV Optik Rathenow; Bremen Cup winners: Bremer SV; Hamburg Cup winners: USC Paloma; Hesse Cup winners: Kickers Offenbach^{2}; Mecklenburg-Vorpommern Cup winners: 1. FC Neubrandenburg 04; Middle Rhine Cup winners: FC Viktoria Köln; Lower Rhine Cup winners: MSV Duisburg; Lower Saxony Cup finalists^{1}: FT Braunschweig; Lower Saxony Cup finalists^{1}: BSV Schwarz-Weiß Rehden; Rhineland Cup winners: Eintracht Trier; Saarland Cup winners: FC 08 Homburg; Saxony Cup winners: Chemnitzer FC; Saxony-Anhalt Cup winners: 1. FC Magdeburg; Schleswig-Holstein Cup winners: Holstein Kiel; South Baden Cup winners: SV Waldkirch; South West Cup winners: SV Alemannia Waldalgesheim; Thuringia Cup winners: FC Carl Zeiss Jena; Westphalia Cup finalists^{1}: Preußen Münster; Westphalia Cup finalists^{1}: Sportfreunde Siegen; Württemberg Cup winners: Stuttgarter Kickers

^{1} The three regions with the most participating teams in their league competitions (Bavaria, Lower Saxony, Westphalia) are allowed to enter two teams for the competition.
^{2} As Hesse finalists SV Darmstadt 98 qualified through their league position, Kickers Offenbach were guaranteed a spot regardless of the final result.
^{3} FV Illertissen qualified as 2nd placed team in the 2013–14 Regionalliga Bayern as winners Bayern Munich II are ineligible to play in the DFB-Pokal.

== Schedule ==
The rounds of the 2014–15 competition were scheduled as follows:

- First round: 15–18 August 2014
- Second round: 28–29 October 2014
- Round of 16: 3–4 March 2015
- Quarter-finals: 7–8 April 2015
- Semi-finals: 28–29 April 2015
- Final: 30 May 2015 at Olympiastadion, Berlin

== Draw ==
The draws for the different rounds were conducted as following: For the first round, the participating teams were split into two pots. The first pot contained all teams which had qualified through their regional cup competitions, the best four teams of the 3. Liga and the bottom four teams of the 2. Bundesliga. Every team from this pot was drawn to a team from the second pot, which contained all remaining professional teams. The teams from the first pot were set as the home team in the process.

The two-pot scenario was also applied for the second round, with the remaining 3. Liga/amateur teams in the first pot and the remaining professional teams in the other pot. Once one pot was empty, the remaining pairings were drawn from the other pot with the first-drawn team for a match serving as hosts. For the remaining rounds, the draw was conducted from just one pot. Any remaining 3. Liga/amateur team was the home team if drawn against a professional team. In every other case, the first-drawn team served as hosts.

== Matches ==
=== First round ===
The draw for the first round was on 1 June. Fernanda Brandão and Horst Hrubesch drew the matches.

15 August 2014	Chemnitzer FC	5–5 (a.e.t.) (5–4 p)	Mainz 05	Chemnitz
19:00	Fink 50', 53'; Bungert 87' (o.g.); Ziereis 103'; Kehl-Gómez 119'	Report	Zimling 24'; Okazaki 49'; Koo Ja-cheol 73'; Bungert 109'; Geis 120+2'	Stadium: Stadion an der Gellertstraße; Attendance: 10,000; Referee: Patrick Ittrich (Hamburg)
	Penalties
	Garbuschewski (penalty scored); Türpitz (penalty scored); Hofrath (penalty scored); Kehl-Gómez (penalty scored); Fink (penalty scored)		(penalty scored) Geis; (penalty scored) Koo Ja-cheol; (penalty missed) Jara; (penalty scored) Park Joo-ho; (penalty scored) Brosinski

15 August 2014	Alemannia Waldalgesheim	0–6	Bayer Leverkusen	Mainz
19:00		Report	Kießling 2', 24', 31', 41', 60'; Son Heung-Min 82'	Stadium: Stadion am Bruchweg; Attendance: 7,524; Referee: Benjamin Brand (Gerolzhofen)

15 August 2014	MSV Duisburg	1–0	1. FC Nürnberg	Duisburg
20:00	Janjić 11' (pen.)	Report		Stadium: MSV-Arena; Attendance: 18,108; Referee: Christian Dingert (Lebecksmühle)

16 August 2014	FC 08 Homburg	1–3	Borussia Mönchengladbach	Homburg
15:30	Stegerer 20'	Report	Hahn 8'; Hrgota 45+2', 51'	Stadium: Waldstadion Homburg; Attendance: 17,000; Referee: Benjamin Cortus (Röthenbach)

16 August 2014	FSV Optik Rathenow	1–3	FC St. Pauli	Rathenow
15:30	Printemps 83'	Report	Nöthe 9', 51'; Budimir 31'	Stadium: Stadion Vogelgesang; Attendance: 4,500; Referee: Sven Jablonski (Bremen)

16 August 2014	Bremer SV	0–1	Eintracht Braunschweig	Bremen
15:30		Report	Nielsen 46'	Stadium: Weserstadion Platz 11; Attendance: 2,901; Referee: Martin Thomsen (Kleve)

16 August 2014	VfL Bochum	2–0	VfB Stuttgart	Bochum
15:30	Terodde 9', 48'	Report		Stadium: Ruhrstadion; Attendance: 22,694; Referee: Wolfgang Stark (Ergolding)

16 August 2014	FC Viktoria Köln	2–4	Hertha BSC	Cologne
15:30	Wunderlich 57'; Candan 67'	Report	Ronny 33'; Beerens 41'; Haraguchi 51'; Schieber 76'	Stadium: Sportpark Höhenberg; Attendance: 5,239; Referee: Arne Aarnink (Nordhorn)

16 August 2014	Stuttgarter Kickers	1–4	Borussia Dortmund	Stuttgart
15:30	Edwini-Bonsu 60'	Report	Mkhitaryan 30'; Aubameyang 55', 78'; Ramos 89'	Stadium: Mercedes-Benz Arena; Attendance: 37,000; Referee: Peter Sippel (Munich)

16 August 2014	FC Astoria Walldorf	1–3	Hannover 96	Walldorf
15:30	Hillenbrand 59'	Report	Joselu 29', 79'; Stindl 76'	Stadium: FC-Astoria Stadion; Attendance: 3,400; Referee: Martin Petersen (Stuttgart)

16 August 2014	FT Braunschweig	0–4	1. FC Köln	Braunschweig
15:30		Report	Ujah 46', 52'; Lehmann 63'; Zoller 87'	Stadium: Eintracht-Stadion; Attendance: 9,067; Referee: Christian Bandurski (Oberhausen)

16 August 2014	SV Waldkirch	0–3	Greuther Fürth	Bahlingen
15:30		Report	Schröck 46'; Mudrinski 52'; Röcker 82'	Stadium: Kaiserstuhlstadion; Attendance: 3,820; Referee: Malte Dittrich (Bremen)

16 August 2014	SV Wehen Wiesbaden	0–0 (a.e.t.) (3–5 p)	1. FC Kaiserslautern	Wiesbaden
18:00		Report		Stadium: BRITA-Arena; Attendance: 9,496; Referee: Sascha Stegemann (Niederkassel)
	Penalties
	Wiemann (penalty scored); Book (penalty missed); Mrowca (penalty scored); Geyer (penalty scored)		(penalty scored) Hofmann; (penalty scored) Fomitschow; (penalty scored) Mugoša; (penalty scored) Torrejón; (penalty scored) Heintz

16 August 2014	FC Viktoria Berlin	0–2	Eintracht Frankfurt	Berlin
20:30		Report	Seferovic 9'; Meier 90+3'	Stadium: Friedrich-Ludwig-Jahn-Sportpark; Attendance: 10,514; Referee: Thorsten Schriever (Dorum)

16 August 2014	Sportfreunde Siegen	3–3 (a.e.t.) (4–5 p)	FSV Frankfurt	Siegen
20:30	Bouadoud 17', 118'; Ibrahimaj 32'	Report	Yelen 41'; Kapllani 73', 98'	Stadium: Leimbachstadion; Attendance: 4,226; Referee: René Rohde (Rostock)
	Penalties
	Dalman (penalty missed); Glowacz (penalty scored); Frisch (penalty missed); König (penalty scored); Hayer (penalty scored); Bouadoud (penalty scored); Volina (penalty missed); Hartwig (penalty missed)		(penalty scored) Kapllani; (penalty scored) Konrad; (penalty missed) Kruska; (penalty missed) Schembri; (penalty scored) Grifo; (penalty scored) Engels; (penalty missed) Huber; (penalty scored) Beugelsdijk

17 August 2014	BSV Schwarz-Weiß Rehden	1–1 (a.e.t.) (3–4 p)	VfR Aalen	Cloppenburg
14:30	Daghfous 21' (o.g.)	Report	Klauß 57'	Stadium: TimePartner Arena; Attendance: 900; Referee: Patrick Alt (Heusweiler)
	Penalties
	Wessel (penalty scored); Winkelmann (penalty scored); Bolyki (penalty scored); Goldmanns (penalty missed); Heyken (penalty missed)		(penalty scored) Junglas; (penalty scored) Drexler; (penalty scored) Weiß; (penalty missed) Hainault; (penalty scored) Leandro

17 August 2014	Holstein Kiel	1–2	TSV 1860 München	Kiel
14:30	Siedschlag 8'	Report	Okotie 65', 81'	Stadium: Holstein-Stadion; Attendance: 8,408; Referee: Felix Zwayer (Berlin)

17 August 2014	FV Illertissen	2–3 (a.e.t.)	Werder Bremen	Ulm
14:30	Nebel 25'; Hämmerle 102'	Report	Hajrović 4'; Lukimya 93'; Selke 99'	Stadium: Donaustadion; Attendance: 10,205; Referee: Timo Gerach (Landau)

17 August 2014	FC Carl Zeiss Jena	0–1	Erzgebirge Aue	Jena
14:30		Report	Okoronkwo 39'	Stadium: Ernst-Abbe-Sportfeld; Attendance: 8,745; Referee: Frank Willenborg (Osnabrück)

17 August 2014	USC Paloma	0–9	1899 Hoffenheim	Hamburg
14:30		Report	Elyounoussi 9'; Bičakčić 17'; Schipplock 18', 28', 33', 45', 54'; Szalai 34'; Modeste 90'	Stadium: Stadion Hoheluft; Attendance: 4,750; Referee: Sören Storks (Velen)

17 August 2014	Eintracht Trier	0–2	SC Freiburg	Trier
16:00		Report	Schuster 51'; Guédé 68'	Stadium: Moselstadion; Attendance: 5,292; Referee: Robert Kampka (Mainz)

17 August 2014	Preußen Münster	1–4	Bayern Munich	Münster
16:00	Krohne 89' (pen.)	Report	Götze 19'; Müller 29'; Alaba 52'; Pizarro 73'	Stadium: Preußen-Stadion; Attendance: 16,797; Referee: Guido Winkmann (Kerken)

17 August 2014	Würzburger Kickers	3–2	Fortuna Düsseldorf	Würzburg
16:00	Bieber 51', 55'; Lewerenz 114'	Report	Schmidtgal 42'; Pinto 58'	Stadium: Flyeralarm Arena; Attendance: 10,500; Referee: Marcel Göpferich (Bad Schönborn)

17 August 2014	Neubrandenburg 04	1–3	Karlsruher SC	Neubrandenburg
16:00	Fischer 48'	Report	Krebs 51'; Mauersberger 55' (pen.); Mitsanski 67' (pen.)	Stadium: Friedrich-Ludwig-Jahn-Sportpark; Attendance: 3,000; Referee: Florian Heft (Wietmarschen)

17 August 2014	Arminia Bielefeld	4–1	SV Sandhausen	Bielefeld
16:00	Schuppan 42'; Klos 57'; Dick 60'; Müller 64'	Report	Kübler 76'	Stadium: Bielefelder Alm; Attendance: 7,305; Referee: Christian Dietz (Kronach)

17 August 2014	1. FC Magdeburg	1–0	FC Augsburg	Magdeburg
18:30	Beck 57'	Report		Stadium: MDCC-Arena; Attendance: 17,854; Referee: Robert Kempter (Sauldorf)

17 August 2014	RB Leipzig	2–1 (a.e.t.)	SC Paderborn	Leipzig
18:30	Jung 43'; Fandrich 109'	Report	Koç 27'	Stadium: Red Bull Arena; Attendance: 24,348; Referee: Harm Osmers (Hanover)

17 August 2014	Darmstadt 98	0–0 (a.e.t.) (4–5 p)	VfL Wolfsburg	Darmstadt
20:30		Report		Stadium: Stadion am Böllenfalltor; Attendance: 13,900; Referee: Peter Gagelmann (Bremen)
	Penalties
	Brégerie (penalty scored); Behrens (penalty scored); Holland (penalty scored); Exslager (penalty missed); Stroh-Engel (penalty scored); Ivana (penalty missed)		(penalty missed) Naldo; (penalty scored) Dost; (penalty scored) Rodriguez; (penalty scored) De Bruyne; (penalty scored) Olić; (penalty scored) Vieirinha

18 August 2014	1. FC Heidenheim	2–1	Union Berlin	Heidenheim
18:30	Schnatterer 53' (pen.); Grimaldi 69'	Report	Schönheim 79'	Stadium: Voith-Arena; Attendance: 7,600; Referee: Robert Hartmann (Wangen)

18 August 2014	Kickers Offenbach	0–0 (a.e.t.) (4–2 p)	FC Ingolstadt	Offenbach
18:30		Report		Stadium: Sparda Bank Hessen Stadium; Attendance: 7,386
	Penalties
	Müller (penalty scored); Cappek (penalty scored); Bäcker (penalty scored); Gjasula (penalty scored)		(penalty scored) Morales; (penalty missed) Groß; (penalty scored) Matip; (penalty missed) da Costa

18 August 2014	Energie Cottbus	2–2 (a.e.t.) (1–4 p)	Hamburger SV	Cottbus
18:30	Zeitz 10'; Michel 105'	Report	Westermann 70'; Van der Vaart 96'	Stadium: Stadion der Freundschaft; Attendance: 16,184; Referee: Thorsten Kinhöfer (Herne)
	Penalties
	Pawela (penalty missed); Holz (penalty scored); Michel (penalty missed)		(penalty scored) Van der Vaart; (penalty scored) Djourou; (penalty scored) Jansen; (penalty scored) Rudņevs

18 August 2014	Dynamo Dresden	2–1	Schalke 04	Dresden
20:30	Eilers 24'; Teixeira 50'	Report	Matip 78'	Stadium: Glücksgas Stadion; Attendance: 29,590; Referee: Deniz Aytekin (Oberasbach)

=== Second round ===
The draw for the second round was held on 23 August. Marcus Sorg and Vanessa Huppenkothen drew the matches. The lowest ranked teams left in the competition were Würzburger Kickers, 1. FC Magdeburg and Kickers Offenbach from the fourth tier of German football

28 October 2014	Chemnitzer FC	0–2	Werder Bremen	Chemnitz
19:00		Report	Bartels 31'; Di Santo 49'	Stadium: Stadion an der Gellertstraße; Attendance: 10,161; Referee: Markus Schmidt (Stuttgart)

28 October 2014	Arminia Bielefeld	0–0 (a.e.t.) (4–2 p)	Hertha BSC	Bielefeld
19:00		Report		Stadium: Bielefelder Alm; Attendance: 23,089; Referee: Robert Hartmann (Wangen)
	Penalties
	Klos (penalty scored); Salger (penalty missed); Ulm (penalty scored); Brinkmann (penalty scored); Lorenz (penalty scored)		(penalty scored) Ronny; (penalty scored) Hegeler; (penalty missed) Schieber; (penalty missed) Wagner

28 October 2014	Kickers Offenbach	1–0	Karlsruher SC	Offenbach
19:00	Pintol 63'	Report		Stadium: Sparda Bank Hessen Stadium; Attendance: 16,106; Referee: Bibiana Steinhaus (Hanover)

28 October 2014	VfR Aalen	2–0	Hannover 96	Aalen
19:00	Gülselam 24' (o.g.); Klauß 59'	Report		Stadium: Scholz-Arena; Attendance: 5,448; Referee: Wolfgang Stark (Ergolding)

28 October 2014	Dynamo Dresden	2–1 (a.e.t.)	VfL Bochum	Dresden
20:30	Eilers 61', 94'	Report	Terodde 54'	Stadium: Glücksgas Stadion; Attendance: 28,500; Referee: Markus Wingenbach (Mainz)

28 October 2014	MSV Duisburg	0–0 (a.e.t.) (1–4 p)	1. FC Köln	Duisburg
20:30		Report		Stadium: MSV-Arena; Attendance: 30,600; Referee: Peter Sippel (Munich)
	Penalties
	Grote (penalty missed); Janjić (penalty missed); Feltscher (penalty scored)		(penalty scored) Lehmann; (penalty scored) Vogt; (penalty scored) Wimmer; (penalty scored) Matuszczyk

28 October 2014	1. FC Kaiserslautern	2–0	SpVgg Greuther Fürth	Kaiserslautern
20:30	Hofmann 12', 22'	Report		Stadium: Fritz-Walter-Stadion; Attendance: 23,111; Referee: Bastian Dankert (Rostock)

28 October 2014	FC St. Pauli	0–3	Borussia Dortmund	Hamburg
20:30		Report	Immobile 33'; Reus 44'; Kagawa 86'	Stadium: Millerntor-Stadion; Attendance: 29,063; Referee: Günter Perl (Pullach)

29 October 2014	1. FC Magdeburg	2–2 (a.e.t.) (4–5 p)	Bayer Leverkusen	Magdeburg
19:00	Siefkes 28'; Brandt 111'	Report	Çalhanoğlu 3'; Papadopoulos 116'	Stadium: MDCC-Arena; Attendance: 23,855; Referee: Daniel Siebert (Berlin)
	Penalties
	Hammann (penalty scored); Bankert (penalty scored); Puttkammer (penalty scored); Hebisch (penalty missed); Brandt (penalty missed); Sowislo (penalty scored); Fuchs (penalty missed)		(penalty missed) Spahić; (penalty scored) Kruse; (penalty scored) Toprak; (penalty missed) Kießling; (penalty scored) Brandt; (penalty scored) Öztunalı; (penalty scored) Jedvaj

29 October 2014	Würzburger Kickers	0–1	Eintracht Braunschweig	Würzburg
19:00		Report	Nielsen 78'	Stadium: Flyeralarm Arena; Attendance: 11,240; Referee: Robert Kampka (Mainz)

29 October 2014	TSV 1860 München	2–5	SC Freiburg	Munich
19:00	Rama 16'; Okotie 69'	Report	Freis 25'; Mehmedi 59', 64', 89'; Schmid 84'	Stadium: Allianz Arena; Attendance: 18,100; Referee: Sascha Stegemann (Niederkassel)

29 October 2014	RB Leipzig	3–1 (a.e.t.)	Erzgebirge Aue	Leipzig
19:00	Poulsen 90+1'; Kaiser 98' (pen.); Boyd 108'	Report	Klostermann 20' (o.g.)	Stadium: Red Bull Arena; Attendance: 28,419; Referee: Tobias Stieler (Hamburg)

29 October 2014	Hamburger SV	1–3	Bayern Munich	Hamburg
20:30	Lasogga 85'	Report	Lewandowski 7'; Alaba 44'; Ribéry 55'	Stadium: Imtech Arena; Attendance: 57,000; Referee: Marco Fritz (Korb)

29 October 2014	1899 Hoffenheim	5–1	FSV Frankfurt	Sinsheim
20:30	Schipplock 23'; Vestergaard 45+3'; Firmino 57', 90'; Modeste 72'	Report	Schembri 80'	Stadium: Rhein-Neckar Arena; Attendance: 11,441; Referee: Jochen Drees (Münster-Sarmsheim)

29 October 2014	VfL Wolfsburg	4–1	1. FC Heidenheim	Wolfsburg
20:30	Caligiuri 28'; Dost 44'; Luiz Gustavo 65', 78'	Report	Schnatterer 12'	Stadium: Volkswagen Arena; Attendance: 7,608; Referee: Thorsten Kinhöfer (Herne)

29 October 2014	Eintracht Frankfurt	1–2	Borussia Mönchengladbach	Frankfurt
20:30	Kadlec 89'	Report	Hazard 17'; Traoré 67'	Stadium: Commerzbank-Arena; Attendance: 46,500; Referee: Knut Kircher (Rottenburg)

=== Round of 16 ===
The draw for the round of 16 was held on 29 October. Horst Hrubesch and Judith Rakers drew the matches. The lowest ranked team left in the competition was Kickers Offenbach from level four in German football

3 March 2015	Bayer Leverkusen	2–0 (a.e.t.)	1. FC Kaiserslautern	Leverkusen
19:00	Çalhanoğlu 102'; Kießling 114'	Report		Stadium: BayArena; Attendance: 26,601; Referee: Guido Winkmann (Kerken)

3 March 2015	VfR Aalen	0–2	1899 Hoffenheim	Aalen
19:00		Report	Polanski 16'; Volland 56'	Stadium: Scholz-Arena; Attendance: 8,252; Referee: Sascha Stegemann (Niederkassel)

3 March 2015	SC Freiburg	2–1	1. FC Köln	Freiburg
20:30	Ujah 17' (o.g.); Darida 19'	Report	Deyverson 89'	Stadium: Dreisamstadion; Attendance: 18,800; Referee: Manuel Gräfe (Berlin)

3 March 2015	Dynamo Dresden	0–2	Borussia Dortmund	Dresden
20:30		Report	Immobile 50', 90'	Stadium: Glücksgas Stadion; Attendance: 30,503; Referee: Tobias Welz (Wiesbaden)

4 March 2015	RB Leipzig	0–2	VfL Wolfsburg	Leipzig
19:00		Report	Caligiuri 20'; Klose 57'	Stadium: Red Bull Arena; Attendance: 43,348; Referee: Thorsten Kinhöfer (Herne)

4 March 2015	Arminia Bielefeld	3–1	Werder Bremen	Bielefeld
19:00	Junglas 32', 84'; Schuppan 57'	Report	Fritz 76'	Stadium: Bielefelder Alm; Attendance: 26,601; Referee: Bastian Dankert (Rostock)

4 March 2015	Kickers Offenbach	0–2	Borussia Mönchengladbach	Offenbach
20:30		Report	Kruse 52' (pen.); Herrmann 83'	Stadium: Sparda Bank Hessen Stadium; Attendance: 20,500; Referee: Christian Dingert (Lebecksmühle)

4 March 2015	Bayern Munich	2–0	Eintracht Braunschweig	Munich
20:30	Alaba 45+1'; Götze 57'	Report		Stadium: Allianz Arena; Attendance: 75,000; Referee: Jochen Drees (Münster-Sarmsheim)

=== Quarter-finals ===
The draw was made on 8 March 2015. Thomas Schneider and Nia Künzer drew the matches. The lowest ranked team left in the competition was Arminia Bielefeld from the 3. Liga, the third level in German football. The matches will be played on 7–8 April 2015.

7 April 2015	VfL Wolfsburg	1–0	SC Freiburg	Wolfsburg
19:00	Rodriguez 72' (pen.)	Report		Stadium: Volkswagen Arena; Attendance: 15,237; Referee: Tobias Stieler (Hamburg)

7 April 2015	Borussia Dortmund	3–2 (a.e.t.)	1899 Hoffenheim	Dortmund
20:30	Subotić 19'; Aubameyang 57'; Kehl 107'	Report	Volland 21'; Firmino 28'	Stadium: Westfalenstadion; Attendance: 80,667; Referee: Deniz Aytekin (Oberasbach)

8 April 2015	Arminia Bielefeld	1–1 (a.e.t.) (5–4 p)	Borussia Mönchengladbach	Bielefeld
19:00	Junglas 26'	Report	Kruse 32' (pen.)	Stadium: Bielefelder Alm; Attendance: 26,137; Referee: Wolfgang Stark (Ergolding)
	Penalties
	Klos (penalty scored); Dick (penalty scored); Ulm (penalty scored); Brinkmann (penalty scored); Lorenz (penalty missed); Burmeister (penalty scored)		(penalty missed) Raffael; (penalty scored) Johnson; (penalty scored) Xhaka; (penalty scored) Brouwers; (penalty scored) Kruse; (penalty missed) Traoré

8 April 2015	Bayer Leverkusen	0–0 (a.e.t.) (3–5 p)	Bayern Munich	Leverkusen
20:30		Report		Stadium: BayArena; Attendance: 30,210; Referee: Felix Zwayer (Berlin)
	Penalties
	Drmić (penalty missed); Bender (penalty scored); Castro (penalty scored); Çalhanoğlu (penalty scored)		(penalty scored) Müller; (penalty scored) Lewandowski; (penalty scored) Alonso; (penalty scored) Götze; (penalty scored) Thiago

=== Semi-finals ===
The draw was made on 8 April 2015. Horst Hrubesch and Rico Weiler drew the pairings. The lowest ranked team left in the competition was Arminia Bielefeld from the 3. Liga, the third level in German football. The matches were played on 28–29 April 2015.

28 April 2015
20:30

Bayern Munich	1–1 (a.e.t.)	Borussia Dortmund
Lewandowski 29'	Report	Aubameyang 75'
Penalties
Lahm (penalty missed); Alonso (penalty missed); Götze (penalty missed); Neuer (penalty missed)	0–2	(penalty scored) Gündoğan; (penalty scored) Kehl; (penalty missed) Hummels

Allianz Arena, Munich
Attendance: 75,000
Referee: Peter Gagelmann (Bremen)

29 April 2015
20:30

Arminia Bielefeld	0–4	VfL Wolfsburg
	Report	Arnold 8', 55'; Luiz Gustavo 32'; Perišić 51'

Bielefelder Alm, Bielefeld
Attendance: 26,137
Referee: Tobias Welz (Wiesbaden)

=== Final ===
30 May 2015
20:00 CEST

Borussia Dortmund	1–3	VfL Wolfsburg
Aubameyang 5'	Report	Luiz Gustavo 22'; De Bruyne 33'; Dost 38'

Olympiastadion, Berlin
Attendance: 75,815
Referee: Felix Brych (Munich)

== Bracket ==
The following is the bracket which the DFB-Pokal resembled. Numbers in parentheses next to the match score represent the results of a penalty shoot-out. Teams that are bolded advanced on. If "aet" is in parentheses next to a team name, it means that they advanced after extra time. If "p" is in parentheses next to a team name, it means that they advanced after a penalty shoot-out.

**First round** 15–18 August 2014
**1. FC Magdeburg**	1
FC Augsburg	0
Alemannia Waldalgesheim	0
**Bayer Leverkusen**	6
Wehen Wiesbaden	0 (3)
**1. FC Kaiserslautern** (p)	0 (5)
SV Waldkirch	0
**Greuther Fürth**	3
Energie Cottbus	2 (1)
**Hamburger SV** (p)	2 (4)
Preußen Münster	1
**Bayern Munich**	4
**Würzburger Kickers**	3
Fortuna Düsseldorf	2
Bremer SV	0
**Eintracht Braunschweig**	1
**Dynamo Dresden**	2
Schalke 04	1
**VfL Bochum**	2
VfB Stuttgart	0
Optik Rathenow	1
**FC St. Pauli**	3
Stuttgarter Kickers	1
**Borussia Dortmund**	4
Schwarz-Weiß Rehden	1 (3)
**VfR Aalen** (p)	1 (4)
Astoria Walldorf	1
**Hannover 96**	3
USC Paloma	0
**1899 Hoffenheim**	9
Sportfreunde Siegen	3 (4)
**FSV Frankfurt** (p)	3 (5)
**Arminia Bielefeld**	4
SV Sandhausen	1
Viktoria Köln	2
**Hertha BSC**	4
**Chemnitzer FC** (p)	5 (5)
Mainz 05	5 (4)
FV Illertissen	2
**Werder Bremen** (aet)	3
**Kickers Offenbach** (p)	0 (4)
FC Ingolstadt	0 (2)
Neubrandenburg 04	1
**Karlsruher SC**	3
Viktoria Berlin	0
**Eintracht Frankfurt**	2
FC Homburg	1
**Borussia Mönchengladbach**	3
**RB Leipzig** (aet)	2
Paderborn 07	1
Carl Zeiss Jena	0
**Erzgebirge Aue**	1
Darmstadt 98	0 (4)
**VfL Wolfsburg** (p)	0 (5)
**1. FC Heidenheim**	2
Union Berlin	1
Holstein Kiel	1
**1860 München**	2
Eintrach Trier	0
**SC Freiburg**	2
**MSV Duisburg**	1
1. FC Nürnberg	0
FT Braunschweig	0
**1. FC Köln**	4

**Second round** 28–29 October 2014
1. FC Magdeburg	2 (4)
**Bayer Leverkusen** (p)	2 (5)
**1. FC Kaiserslautern**	2
Greuther Fürth	0
Hamburger SV	1
**Bayern Munich**	3
Würzburger Kickers	0
**Eintracht Braunschweig**	1
**Dynamo Dresden** (aet)	2
VfL Bochum	1
FC St. Pauli	0
**Borussia Dortmund**	3
**VfR Aalen**	2
Hannover 96	0
**1899 Hoffenheim**	5
FSV Frankfurt	1
**Arminia Bielefeld** (p)	0 (4)
Hertha BSC	0 (2)
Chemnitzer FC	0
**Werder Bremen**	2
**Kickers Offenbach**	1
Karlsruher SC	0
Eintracht Frankfurt	1
**Borussia Mönchengladbach**	2
**RB Leipzig** (aet)	3
Erzgebirge Aue	1
**VfL Wolfsburg**	4
1. FC Heidenheim	1
1860 München	2
**SC Freiburg**	5
MSV Duisburg	0 (1)
**1. FC Köln** (p)	0 (4)

**Round of 16**; 3–4 March 2015
**Bayer Leverkusen** (aet)	2
1. FC Kaiserslautern	0
**Bayern Munich**	2
Eintracht Braunschweig	0
Dynamo Dresden	0
**Borussia Dortmund**	2
VfR Aalen	0
**1899 Hoffenheim**	2
**Arminia Bielefeld**	3
Werder Bremen	1
Kickers Offenbach	0
**Borussia Mönchengladbach**	2
RB Leipzig	0
**VfL Wolfsburg**	2
**SC Freiburg**	2
1. FC Köln	1

**Quarter-finals**; 7–8 April 2015
Bayer Leverkusen	0 (3)
**Bayern Munich** (p)	0 (5)
**Borussia Dortmund** (aet)	3
1899 Hoffenheim	2
**Arminia Bielefeld** (p)	1 (5)
Borussia Mönchengladbach	1 (4)
**VfL Wolfsburg**	1
SC Freiburg	0

**Semi-finals**; 28–29 April 2015
Bayern Munich	1 (0)
**Borussia Dortmund** (p)	1 (2)
Arminia Bielefeld	0
**VfL Wolfsburg**	4

**Final**; 30 May 2015
Borussia Dortmund	1
**VfL Wolfsburg**	3

== Top goalscorers ==
The following are the top scorers of the DFB-Pokal, sorted first by number of goals, and then alphabetically if necessary. Goals scored in penalty shoot-outs are not included.

Rank	Player	Team	Goals
1	(Germany) Stefan Kießling	Bayer Leverkusen	6
1	(Germany) Sven Schipplock	1899 Hoffenheim	6
3	(Gabon) Pierre-Emerick Aubameyang	Borussia Dortmund	5
4	(Brazil) Luiz Gustavo	VfL Wolfsburg	4
5	(Austria) David Alaba	Bayern Munich	3
5	(Germany) Justin Eilers	Dynamo Dresden	3
5	(Brazil) Roberto Firmino	1899 Hoffenheim	3
5	(Germany) Philipp Hofmann	Kaiserslautern	3
5	(Italy) Ciro Immobile	Borussia Dortmund	3
5	(Germany) Manuel Junglas	Arminia Bielefeld	3
5	(Switzerland) Admir Mehmedi	SC Freiburg	3
5	(Switzerland) Rubin Okotie	1860 München	3
5	(Germany) Simon Terodde	VfL Bochum	3
