= 2012–13 FC Energie Cottbus season =

FC Energie Cottbus
2012–13 season
- Chairman: Ulrich Lepsch
- Manager: Rudi Bommer
- Stadium: Stadion der Freundschaft, Cottbus, Germany
- 2.Bundesliga: 8th
- DFB-Pokal: First round
- Top goalscorer: League: Boubacar Sanogo (15); All: Boubacar Sanogo (15)
- Highest home attendance: 20,500 vs. Dynamo Dresden, 11 November 2012
- Lowest home attendance: 6,492 vs. Jahn Regensburg, 24 February 2013
- Average home league attendance: 10,405
Home colours	Away colours

The 2012–13 FC Energie Cottbus season is the 48th season in the club's football history. In 2012–13 the club plays in the 2. Fußball-Bundesliga, the second tier of German football. It is the clubs fourth consecutive season in this league, having played at this level since 2009–10, after it was relegated from the Fußball-Bundesliga in 2009.

The club also took part in the 2012–13 edition of the DFB-Pokal, the German Cup, but was knocked out in the first round by fellow second division side SV Sandhausen.

== Matches ==
=== Legend ===
Win Draw Loss Postponed

=== Friendly matches ===
7 July 2012	FC Energie Cottbus	15–0	SV Fichte Kunersdorf	Cottbus
14:30	Martin Fenin; Boubacar Sanogo; Marco Stiepermann; Nicolas Farina; Alexander Ludwig; Uwe Hünemeier; Julian Börner; Uwe Möhrle; Sebastian Glasner; Clemens Fandrich; Dennis Sørensen	Report		Stadium: Sudstadion; Attendance: 3,000

18 July 2012	Al Ain FC	1–1	FC Energie Cottbus	Tirol
17:00	Hallalah 65'	Report	Glasner 52'	Stadium: Angerberg; Attendance: 100

20 July 2012	SV Werder Bremen	1–1	FC Energie Cottbus	Zillertal
16:30	Elia 32'	Report	Adlung 86'	Stadium: Zell am Ziller; Attendance: 1,500

27 July 2012	SC Laubsdorf	0–3	FC Energie Cottbus	Briesen
18:00		Report	Ludwig 7'; Farina 82'; Möhrle 90'	Stadium: Sportplatz Briesen; Attendance: 1,000

29 July 2012	FC Energie Cottbus	2–2	West Ham United F.C.	Cottbus
13:30 BST	Adlung 8', 42'	Report	Kazim-Richards 77'; Baldock 79'	Stadium: Stadion der Freundschaft; Attendance: 10,302

=== 2. Bundesliga ===
3 August 2012 1	FC Ingolstadt 04	2–2	Energie Cottbus	Ingolstadt
18:00	Leitl 18', 28'	Report	Sanogo 80', 88'	Stadium: Audi Sportpark; Attendance: 6,517; Referee: Tobias Welz

10 August 2012 2	Energie Cottbus	3–0	Erzgebirge Aue	Cottbus
20:30	Adlung 22', 33'; Sanogo 54'	Report		Stadium: Stadion der Freundschaft; Attendance: 12,300; Referee: Knut Kircher

25 August 2012 3	Energie Cottbus	2–0	FC St. Pauli	Cottbus
13:00	Stiepermann 21'; Banovic 66'	Report		Stadium: Stadion der Freundschaft; Attendance: 11,190; Referee: Wolfgang Stark

31 August 2012 4	1. FC Köln	0–1	Energie Cottbus	Köln
18:15		Report	Sanogo 30'	Stadium: RheinEnergieStadion; Attendance: 34,000; Referee: Robert Hartmann

14 September 2012 5	Energie Cottbus	2–2	FSV Frankfurt	Cottbus
18:00	Kruska 51'; Sanogo 90+1'	Report	Görlitz 45'; Heubach 86'	Stadium: Stadion der Freundschaft; Attendance: 10,653; Referee: Benjamin Brand

22 September 2012 6	Jahn Regensburg	0–1	Energie Cottbus	Regensburg
13:00		Report	Sørensen 4'	Stadium: Städtisches Jahnstadion; Attendance: 4,251; Referee: Sascha Stegemann

25 September 2012 7	Energie Cottbus	2–1	SC Paderborn 07	Cottbus
17:30	Farina 67'; Stiepermann 80'	Report	Hofmann 74'	Stadium: Stadion der Freundschaft; Attendance: 8,419; Referee: Robert Kempter

29 September 2012 8	1. FC Union Berlin	3–1	Energie Cottbus	Berlin
13:00	Terodde 35'; Quiring 55'; Jopek 90+2'	Report	Adlung 50'	Stadium: Stadion An der Alten Försterei; Attendance: 16,750; Referee: Deniz Aytekin

6 October 2012 9	Energie Cottbus	0–1	MSV Duisburg	Cottbus
13:00		Report	Sukalo 20'	Stadium: Stadion der Freundschaft; Attendance: 9,276; Referee: Christian Dietz

21 October 2012 10	VfR Aalen	1–1	Energie Cottbus	Aalen
13:30	Dausch 84'	Report	Sanogo 70'	Stadium: Scholz-Arena; Attendance: 6,407; Referee: Christian Bandurski

26 October 2012 11	Energie Cottbus	1–0	1860 München	Cottbus
18:00	Banovic 12'	Report		Stadium: Stadion der Freundschaft; Attendance: 8,820; Referee: Bastian Dankert

4 November 2012 12	VfL Bochum	2–2	Energie Cottbus	Bochum
13:30	Sinkiewicz 73'; Dedic 89'	Report	Sanogo 5', 52'	Stadium: rewirpowerStadion; Attendance: 9,571; Referee: Daniel Siebert

11 November 2012 13	Energie Cottbus	2–0	Dynamo Dresden	Cottbus
13:30	Sørensen 7'; Banovic 30'	Report		Stadium: Stadion der Freundschaft; Attendance: 20,500; Referee: Michael Weiner

16 November 2012 14	1. FC Kaiserslautern	1–0	Energie Cottbus	Kaiserslautern
18:00	Zuck 13'	Report		Stadium: Fritz-Walter-Stadion; Attendance: 29,600; Referee: Knut Kircher

24 November 2012 15	Energie Cottbus	3–1	Eintracht Braunschweig	Cottbus
13:00	Sanogo 5'; Börner 44'; Brinkmann 81'	Report	Kumbela 13'	Stadium: Stadion der Freundschaft; Attendance: 11,740; Referee: Manuel Gräfe

28 November 2012 16	SV Sandhausen	3–1	Energie Cottbus	Sandhausen
17:30	Wooten 59', 66'; Löning 90'	Report	Möhrle 34'	Stadium: Hardtwaldstadion; Attendance: 2,650; Referee: Christian Dingert

3 December 2012 17	Energie Cottbus	1–2	Hertha BSC	Cottbus
20:15	Sørensen 54'	Report	Kluge 16'; Ronny 84'	Stadium: Stadion der Freundschaft; Attendance: 13,070; Referee: Florian Meyer

9 December 2013 18	Energie Cottbus	1–1	FC Ingolstadt 04	Cottbus
13:30	Sanogo 5'	Report	Mijatovic 79'	Stadium: Stadion der Freundschaft; Attendance: 6,745; Referee: Frank Willenborg

14 December 2012 19	Erzgebirge Aue	3–0	Energie Cottbus	Aue
18:00	Sylvestr 38', 80'; Fink 85'	Report		Stadium: Sparkassen-Erzgebirgsstadion; Attendance: 7,050; Referee: Marco Fritz

3 February 2013 20	FC St. Pauli	0–0	Energie Cottbus	Hamburg
13:30		Report		Stadium: Millerntor-Stadion; Attendance: 26,578; Referee: Jochen Drees

9 February 2013 21	Energie Cottbus	0–0	1. FC Köln	Cottbus
13:00		Report		Stadium: Stadion der Freundschaft; Attendance: 10,201; Referee: Bastian Dankert

17 February 2013 22	FSV Frankfurt	1–0	Energie Cottbus	Frankfurt
13:30	Jönsson 39'	Report		Stadium: Frankfurter Volksbank Stadion; Attendance: 3,383; Referee: Bibiana Steinhaus

24 February 2013 23	Energie Cottbus	1–1	Jahn Regensburg	Cottbus
13:30	Carlinhos 17'	Report	Schulze 65'	Stadium: Stadion der Freundschaft; Attendance: 6,492; Referee: Markus Schmidt

1 March 2013 24	SC Paderborn 07	0–1	Energie Cottbus	Paderborn
18:00		Report	Sanogo 50'	Stadium: Benteler Arena; Attendance: 6,535; Referee: Robert Kampka

9 March 2013 25	Energie Cottbus	2–1	1. FC Union Berlin	Cottbus
13:00	Adlung 10'; Sanogo 68'	Report	Mattuschka 38'	Stadium: Stadion der Freundschaft; Attendance: 14,212; Referee: Felix Brych

15 March 2013 26	MSV Duisburg	2–1	Energie Cottbus	Duisburg
18:00	Jovanovic 37'; Bajic 80'	Report	Rivic 87'	Stadium: Schauinsland-Reisen-Arena; Attendance: 9,547; Referee: Benjamin Cortus

28 March 2013 27	Energie Cottbus	1–1	VfR Aalen	Cottbus
18:00	Schulze 74'	Report	Junglas 75'	Stadium: Stadion der Freundschaft; Attendance: 7,770; Referee: Harm Osmers

7 April 2013 28	1860 München	1–1	Energie Cottbus	München
13:30	Halfar 58'	Report	Strohdiek 70'	Stadium: Allianz Arena; Attendance: 18,200; Referee: Daniel Siebert

14 April 2013 29	Energie Cottbus	0–2	VfL Bochum	Cottbus
13:30		Report	Banovic 66' (og.); Dedic 90+2'	Stadium: Stadion der Freundschaft; Attendance: 8,555; Referee: Benjamin Cortus

21 April 2013 30	Dynamo Dresden	1–0	Energie Cottbus	Dresden
13:30	Fort 53'	Report		Stadium: Glücksgas Stadion; Attendance: 29,153; Referee: Peter Sippel

29 April 2013 31	Energie Cottbus	4–2	1. FC Kaiserslautern	Cottbus
20:15	Banovic 32'; Sanogo 53', 90+3'; Fomitschow 81'	Report	Idrissou 50'; Bunjaku 86'	Stadium: Stadion der Freundschaft; Attendance: 7,545; Referee: Wolfgang Stark

6 May 2013 32	Eintracht Braunschweig	0–0	Energie Cottbus	Braunschweig
20:15		Report		Stadium: Eintracht-Stadion; Attendance: 20,445; Referee: Günter Perl

12 May 2013 33	Energie Cottbus	3–0	SV Sandhausen	Cottbus
13:30	Bickel 24'; Sanogo 41'; Adlung 77'	Report		Stadium: Stadion der Freundschaft; Attendance: 9,407; Referee: Benjamin Brand

19 May 2013 34	Hertha BSC	1–1	Energie Cottbus	Berlin
13:30	Brooks 87'	Report	Farina 28'	Stadium: Olympiastadion; Attendance: 63,267; Referee: Deniz Aytekin

=== DFB Pokal ===
20 August 2012 First round	SV Sandhausen	3–0	Energie Cottbus	Sandhausen
18:30	Löning 3'; Schulz 10'; Fießer 90'	Report		Stadium: Hardtwaldstadion; Attendance: 2,700; Referee: Thorsten Kinhöfer
