= 2014–15 Arminia Bielefeld season =

Arminia Bielefeld
2014–15 season
- Chairman: Hands-free Laufer
- Manager: Norbert Meier
- 3. Liga: 1st (promoted)
Home colours	Away colours

In the 2014–15 Arminia Bielefeld season, Arminia Bielefeld will participate in the 3. Liga, the third tier in German football, and the DFB Pokal, the German cup competition.

== Competitions ==
=== 3. Liga ===
==== League table ====
Pos	Team	Pld	W	D	L	GF	GA	GD	Pts	Promotion, qualification or relegation
1	Arminia Bielefeld (C, P)	38	22	8	8	75	41	+34	74	Promotion to 2. Bundesliga and qualification for DFB-Pokal
2	MSV Duisburg (P)	38	20	11	7	63	40	+23	71	Promotion to 2. Bundesliga and qualification for DFB-Pokal
3	Holstein Kiel	38	18	13	7	53	30	+23	67	Qualification for promotion play-offs and DFB-Pokal
4	Stuttgarter Kickers	38	18	11	9	61	47	+14	65	Qualification for DFB-Pokal
5	Chemnitzer FC	38	17	8	13	44	36	+8	59	

Source: DFB
Rules for classification: 1) Points; 2) Goal difference; 3) Goals scored
(C) Champions; (P) Promoted

==== Matches ====
26 July 2014 1	1. FSV Mainz 05 II	1–2	Arminia Bielefeld	Mainz
14:00 CEST (UTC+02:00)	Bouziane 7'; Hendl (yellow card) 41'; Franzin (yellow card) 74'; Müller (yellow card) 90+1'	Report	Klos 38'; Hemlein (yellow card) 73' (goal) 90+1'	Stadium: Stadion am Bruchweg; Attendance: 3,083; Referee: Benjamin Cortus

=== DFB-Pokal ===
17 August 2014 Round 1	Arminia Bielefeld	4–1	SV Sandhausen	Bielefeld
16:00 CEST (UTC+02:00)	Kluge (yellow card) 15'; Schuppan 42' (yellow card) 45'; Klos 57'; Dick 60'; Müller 64'	Report	Kulovits (yellow card) 54'; Bouhaddouz (yellow card) 69'; Kübler 76'; Olajengbesi (yellow card) 90+2'	Stadium: Bielefelder Alm; Attendance: 7,305; Referee: Christian Dietz

28 October 2014 Round 2	Arminia Bielefeld	0–0 (a.e.t.) (4–2 p)	Hertha BSC	Bielefeld
19:00 CET (UTC+01:00)	Schütz (yellow card) 55'; Brinkmann (yellow card) 104'	Report	Hosogai (yellow card) 49'; Brooks (yellow card) 114'	Stadium: Bielefelder Alm; Attendance: 23,089; Referee: Robert Hartmann
	Penalties
	Klos (penalty scored); Salger (penalty missed); Ulm (penalty scored); Brinkmann (penalty scored); Lorenz (penalty scored)		(penalty scored) Ronny; (penalty scored) Hegeler; (penalty missed) Schieber; (penalty missed) Wagner

4 March 2015 Round 3	Arminia Bielefeld	3–1	SV Werder Bremen	Bielefeld
19:00 CET (UTC+01:00)	Junglas 32', 84'; Schuppan 57'; Börner (yellow card) 63'	Report	García (yellow card) 17'; Fritz (yellow card) 67' (yellow-red card) 89' (goal) 76'; Bartels (yellow card) 90+2'	Stadium: Bielefelder Alm; Attendance: 26,601; Referee: Bastian Dankert

9 April 2015 Quarterfinals	Arminia Bielefeld	1–1 (a.e.t.) (5–4 p)	Borussia Mönchengladbach	Bielefeld
19:00 CEST (UTC+02:00)	Junglas (yellow card) 12'; Klos (yellow card) 23' (goal) 26'; Burmeister (yellow card) 104'; Ulm (yellow card) 110'	Report	Kruse 32' (pen.); Hahn (yellow card) 45'; Hazard (yellow card) 65'; Brouwers (yellow card) 90+2'; Xhaka (yellow card) 104'; Jantschke (yellow card) 111'	Stadium: Bielefelder Alm; Attendance: 26,137; Referee: Wolfgang Stark
	Penalties
	Klos (penalty scored); Dick (penalty scored); Ulm (penalty scored); Brinkmann (penalty scored); Lorenz (penalty missed); Burmeister (penalty scored)		(penalty missed) Raffael; (penalty scored) Johnson; (penalty scored) Xhaka; (penalty scored) Brouwers; (penalty scored) Kruse; (penalty missed) Traoré

29 April 2015 Semifinals	Arminia Bielefeld	0–4	VfL Wolfsburg	Bielefeld
20:30 CEST (UTC+02:00)		Report	Arnold 8', 55'; De Bruyne (yellow card) 27'; Luiz Gustavo 31'; Perišić 51'	Stadium: Bielefelder Alm; Attendance: 26,137; Referee: Tobias Welz
