= 2013–14 VfR Aalen season =

VfR Aalen
2013–14 season

VfR Aalen are a German football club which are based in Aalen. During the 2013/14 campaign they will be competing in the 2. Bundesliga, DFB-Pokal.

== 2. Bundesliga ==
19 July 2013 Match 1	Sandhausen	0–0	VfR Aalen	Sandhausen
18:30	Kulovits (yellow card) 76'	Summary	Hübner (yellow card) 63'; Hofmann (yellow card) 90'	Stadium: Hardtwaldstadion; Attendance: 3,825; Referee: (Germany) Martin Thomsen

26 July 2013 Match 2	VfR Aalen	0–2	SpVgg Greuther Fürth	Aalen
18:30	Hübner (yellow card) 82'	Summary	Šukalo 7' (yellow card) 64'; Sparv (yellow card) 45'; Azemi 82'; Hefele (yellow card) 90+2'	Stadium: Städtisches Waldstadion; Attendance: 6,412; Referee: (Germany) Daniel Siebert

11 August 2013 Match 3	Erzgebirge Aue	0–1	VfR Aalen	Aue
13:30	Okoronkwo (yellow card) 19'; Müller (yellow card) 85'	Summary	Hübner (yellow card) 24'; Reichwein (yellow card) 28' (goal) 44'; Grech (yellow card) 64'	Stadium: Sparkassen-Erzgebirgsstadion; Attendance: 8,750; Referee: (Germany) Harm Osmers

18 August 2013 Match 4	Energie Cottbus	5–1	VfR Aalen	Cottbus
13:30	Stiepermann 6'; Sanogo 25', 75'; Bittroff (yellow card) 27'; Jendrišek 30'; Kruska 50'	Summary	Reichwein (yellow card) 31'; Buballa 37'	Stadium: Stadion der Freundschaft; Attendance: 9,112; Referee: (Germany) Christian Fischer

24 August 2013 Match 5	VfR Aalen	4–0	1. FC Kaiserslautern	Aalen
13:00	Barth (yellow card) 27'; Junglas (yellow card) 38'; Löwe 42' (o.g.); Valentini 49', 88'; Buballa 72'	Summary	Gaus (yellow card) 4'; Ring (yellow card) 30'; Idrissou (red card) 43'; Karl (yellow card) 45'; Löwe (yellow card) 51'	Stadium: Städtisches Waldstadion; Attendance: 9,837; Referee: (Germany) Benjamin Brand

1 September 2013 Match 6	Karlsruher SC	1–1	VfR Aalen	Karlsruhe
13:30	Nazarov 7'; Peitz (yellow card) 45'; Mitsanski (yellow card) 54'	Summary	Traut (yellow card) 6'; Lechleiter 39'	Stadium: Wildparkstadion; Attendance: 14,534; Referee: (Germany) Christian Leicher

13 September 2013 Match 7	VfR Aalen	0–0	TSV 1860 München	Aalen
18:30	Valentini (yellow card) 24'; Reichwein (yellow card) 77'	Summary	Stark (yellow card) 45'; Wannenwetsch (yellow card) 67'; Hain (yellow card) 71'	Stadium: Städtisches Waldstadion; Attendance: 8,910; Referee: (Germany) Bibiana Steinhaus

21 September 2013 Match 8	VfL Bochum	1–2	VfR Aalen	Bochum
13:00	Aydın 13'; Zahirović (yellow card) 66'; Ćwielong (yellow card) 82'; Fabian (yellow card) 90+3'	Summary	Lechleiter 3'; Hübner (yellow card) 50'; Valentini 70'; Junglas (yellow card) 90+3'	Stadium: Ruhrstadion; Attendance: 15,051; Referee: (Germany) Robert Hartmann

27 September 2013 Match 9	VfR Aalen	0–1	1. FC Köln	Aalen
18:30	Traut (yellow card) 52'; Hübner (yellow card) 67'; Lechleiter (yellow card) 69'	Summary	Risse 32' (yellow card) 76'; Preszko (yellow card) 68'	Stadium: Städtisches Waldstadion; Attendance: 8,718; Referee: (Germany) Deniz Aytekin

5 October 2013 Match 10	Dynamo Dresden	2–0	VfR Aalen	Dresden
13:00	Aoudia 28'; Hartmann 35'; Losilla (yellow card) 63'; Sušac (yellow card) 75'; Schulz (yellow card) 83'	Summary	Buballa (yellow card) 39'; Klauß (yellow card) 69'; Hofmann (yellow card) 90'	Stadium: Glücksgas Stadium; Attendance: 21,709; Referee: (Germany) Christian Fischer

18 October 2013 Match 11	VfR Aalen	3–0	Arminia Bielefeld	Aalen
18:30	Hofmann 61'; Junglas 70'; Lechleiter (yellow card) 77' (goal) 81'	Summary	Hornig (yellow card) 67'; Riese (yellow card) 82'; Schütz (yellow card) 85'	Stadium: Städtisches Waldstadion; Attendance: 5,904; Referee: (Germany) Rene Rohde
