= 2014–15 1. FSV Mainz 05 season =

1. FSV Mainz 05
2014–15 season
- Manager: Kasper Hjulmand
- Bundesliga: 11th
- DFB-Pokal: Round 1
- UEFA Europa League: Third qualifying round
- Top goalscorer: League: Shinji Okazaki (12); All: Shinji Okazaki (14)
Home colours	Away colours	Third colours

The 2014–15 1. FSV Mainz 05 season is the 110th season in the club's football history. In 2014–15, the club competed in the Bundesliga, the top tier of German football. It is the club's sixth consecutive season in this league, having been promoted from the 2. Bundesliga at the conclusion of the 2008–09 season.

In the previous season, Mainz 05 finished in seventh place, thus qualifying for the UEFA Europa League third qualifying round.

== First team squad ==
As of 1 September 2014

Note: Flags indicate national team as defined under FIFA eligibility rules; some limited exceptions apply. Players may hold more than one non-FIFA nationality.

No.	Pos.	Nation	Player
1	GK	GRE	Stefanos Kapino
2	DF	CHI	Gonzalo Jara
3	DF	GER	Philipp Wollscheid (on loan from Bayer Leverkusen)
4	DF	MKD	Nikolče Noveski (captain)
5	DF	GER	Benedikt Saller
6	MF	GER	Johannes Geis
8	MF	GER	Christoph Moritz
9	FW	TUN	Sami Allagui (on loan from Hertha BSC)
10	MF	SRB	Filip Đuričić (on loan from Benfica)
11	MF	GER	Yunus Mallı
13	MF	KOR	Koo Ja-cheol
14	MF	AUT	Julian Baumgartlinger
15	FW	ARG	Pablo de Blasis
16	DF	GER	Stefan Bell
17	MF	ESP	Jairo
18	MF	GER	Daniel Brosinski

No.	Pos.	Nation	Player
19	MF	COL	Elkin Soto
20	DF	CRC	Júnior Díaz
21	GK	GER	Loris Karius
22	DF	GER	Julian Koch
23	FW	JPN	Shinji Okazaki
24	DF	KOR	Park Joo-ho
26	DF	GER	Niko Bungert
28	MF	BUL	Todor Nedelev
29	FW	GER	Devante Parker
30	MF	GER	Patrick Pflücke
31	MF	GER	Jonas Hofmann (on loan from Borussia Dortmund)
32	DF	GER	Damian Roßbach
34	DF	GER	Tobias Schilk
35	FW	CRO	Petar Slišković
36	FW	AUS	Nikita Rukavytsya
38	GK	GER	Robin Zentner

=== Out on loan ===
Note: Flags indicate national team as defined under FIFA eligibility rules; some limited exceptions apply. Players may hold more than one non-FIFA nationality.

No.	Pos.	Nation	Player
—	MF	GER	Chinedu Ede (at Anorthosis Famagusta)
—	MF	DEN	Niki Zimling (Ajax)
—	FW	GER	Sebastian Polter (at Union Berlin)
—	FW	GER	Dani Schahin (at SC Freiburg)

== Transfers ==
=== In ===
Note: Flags indicate national team as defined under FIFA eligibility rules; some limited exceptions apply. Players may hold more than one non-FIFA nationality.

No.	Pos.	Nation	Player
1	GK	GRE	Stefanos Kapino (from Panathinaikos)
2	DF	CHI	Gonzalo Jara (from Nottingham Forest)
15	FW	ARG	Pablo de Blasis (from Asteras Tripolis)
17	MF	ESP	Jairo (from Sevilla)
18	MF	GER	Daniel Brosinski (from Greuther Fürth)

=== Out ===
Note: Flags indicate national team as defined under FIFA eligibility rules; some limited exceptions apply. Players may hold more than one non-FIFA nationality.

No.	Pos.	Nation	Player
—	GK	CRO	Dario Krešić (at Bayer Leverkusen)
—	GK	GER	Christian Wetklo (at Darmstadt 98)
—	DF	CZE	Zdeněk Pospěch (at SFC Opava)
—	MF	GER	Nicolai Müller (at Hamburger SV)
—	FW	GER	Shawn Parker (at FC Augsburg)
—	FW	CMR	Eric Maxim Choupo-Moting (at Schalke 04)

== Competitions ==
=== Bundesliga ===
==== League table ====
Pos	Team	Pld	W	D	L	GF	GA	GD	Pts
9	Eintracht Frankfurt	34	11	10	13	56	62	−6	43
10	Werder Bremen	34	11	10	13	50	65	−15	43
11	Mainz 05	34	9	13	12	45	47	−2	40
12	1. FC Köln	34	9	13	12	34	40	−6	40
13	Hannover 96	34	9	10	15	40	56	−16	37

Source: DFB
Rules for classification: 1) points; 2) goal difference; 3) number of goals scored

==== Results summary ====
Overall								Home						Away					
Pld	W	D	L	GF	GA	GD	Pts	W	D	L	GF	GA	GD	W	D	L	GF	GA	GD
34	9	13	12	43	45	−2	40	6	6	5	25	19	+6	3	7	7	18	26	−8

Last updated: 9 May 2015.
Source: Competitive matches

==== Results by round ====
Round	1	2	3	4	5	6	7	8	9	10	11	12	13	14	15	16	17	18	19	20	21	22	23	24	25	26	27	28	29	30	31	32	33	34
Ground	A	H	A	H	A	H	A	H	A	H	A	H	A	A	H	A	H	H	A	H	A	H	A	H	A	H	A	H	A	H	H	A	H	A
Result	D	D	W	W	D	D	D	W	L	L	D	D	L	L	D	D	L	W	D	L	D	W	L	D	W	D	D	L	W	W	L	W	W	L
Position	6	10	7	2	4	4	6	3	6																									

Updated to match(es) played on 1 November 2014. Source: Competitive matches
A = Away; H = Home; W = Win; D = Draw; L = Loss

==== Matches ====
24 August 2014 1	SC Paderborn	2–2	Mainz 05	Paderborn
15:30 CEST (UTC+02:00)	Kachunga 37'; Brückner (yellow card) 44'; Vrančić (yellow card) 61'; Hünemeier 87'	Report	Okazaki 33'; Brosinki (yellow card) 45'; Park (yellow card) 67'; Koo 90+4' (pen.)	Stadium: Benteler Arena; Attendance: 14,824; Referee: Peter Sippel

31 August 2014 2	Mainz 05	0–0	Hannover 96	Mainz
15:30 CEST (UTC+02:00)		Report	Schulz (yellow card) 32'	Stadium: Coface Arena; Attendance: 27,647; Referee: Sascha Stegemann

13 September 2014 3	Hertha BSC	1–3	Mainz 05	Berlin
15:30 CEST (UTC+02:00)	Lustenberger (yellow card) 7'; Van den Bergh (yellow card) 45'; Beerens (yellow card) 75'; Ronny 86' (pen.)	Report	Okazaki 36', 90+1'; Allagui (yellow card) 43' (goal) 70'; Díaz (yellow card) 55'; Bungert (yellow card) 85'	Stadium: Olympiastadion; Attendance: 42,069; Referee: Guido Winkmann

20 September 2014 4	Mainz 05	2–0	Borussia Dortmund	Mainz
18:30 CEST (UTC+02:00)	Okazaki 66', (yellow card) 70'; Ginter 74' (o.g.); Geis (yellow card) 82'	Report	Großkreutz (yellow card) 78'	Stadium: Coface Arena; Attendance: 34,000; Referee: Günter Perl

23 September 2014 5	Eintracht Frankfurt	2–2	Mainz 05	Frankfurt
20:00 CEST (UTC+02:00)	Seferovic (yellow card) 26', (goal) 82'; Meier 45+1'; Zambrano (yellow card) 79'; Hasebe (yellow card) 80'	Report	Hofmann 41'; Okazaki 44', (yellow card) 74'; Bell (yellow card) 57'; Jairo (yellow card) 90+4'	Stadium: Commerzbank-Arena; Attendance: 44,100; Referee: Felix Brych

26 September 2014 6	Mainz 05	0–0	1899 Hoffenheim	Mainz
20:30 CEST (UTC+02:00)	Allagui (yellow card) 20'	Report	Polanski (yellow card) 56'; Rudy (yellow card) 71'	Stadium: Coface Arena; Attendance: 28,000; Referee: Felix Zwayer

5 October 2014 7	Borussia Mönchengladbach	1–1	Mainz 05	Mönchengladbach
17:30 CEST (UTC+02:00)	Kruse 15'	Report	Hofmann 31' (pen.); Okazaki (yellow card) 43'; Đuričić (yellow card) 57'; Díaz (yellow card) 90'	Stadium: Borussia-Park; Attendance: 50,383; Referee: Manuel Gräfe

18 October 2014 8	Mainz 05	2–1	FC Augsburg	Mainz
15:30 CEST (UTC+02:00)	Okazaki (yellow card) 18'; Hofmann 20'; Jairo 23'; Allagui (yellow card) 64'; Díaz (yellow card) 69'	Report	Bobadilla (yellow card) 63'; Werner 78', (yellow card) 82'	Stadium: Coface Arena; Attendance: 27,687; Referee: Tobias Stieler

26 October 2014 9	VfL Wolfsburg	3–0	Mainz 05	Wolfsburg
15:30 CET (UTC+01:00)	Naldo 15'; Perišić 59'; Guilavogui (yellow card) 63'; Caligiuri 87'	Report	Soto (yellow card) 26'; Geis (yellow card) 49'; Mallı (yellow card) 85'	Stadium: Volkswagen Arena; Attendance: 26,238; Referee: Guido Winkmann

1 November 2014 10	Mainz 05	1–2	Werder Bremen	Mainz
15:30 CET (UTC+01:00)	Okazaki 3'; Karius (yellow card) 43'; Geis (yellow card) 44'; Mallı (yellow card) 72'; Đuričić (yellow card) 74'	Report	Kroos (yellow card) 18'; Gálvez (yellow card) 21'; Di Santo 44', 49'; Wolf (yellow card) 69'	Stadium: Coface Arena; Attendance: 31,017; Referee: Wolfgang Stark

8 November 2014 11	Bayer Leverkusen	0–0	Mainz 05	Leverkusen
15:30 CET (UTC+01:00)	Wendell (yellow card) 75'	Report	Bell (yellow card) 37'; Jara (yellow card) 57'; Koo (yellow card) 87'	Stadium: BayArena; Attendance: 29,714; Referee: Markus Schmidt

22 November 2014 12	Mainz 05	2–2	SC Freiburg	Mainz
15:30 CET (UTC+01:00)	Díaz 27'; Bell 88'	Report	Schmid 30'; Mehmedi 58'; Klaus (yellow card) 73'	Stadium: Coface Arena; Attendance: 28,157; Referee: Daniel Siebert

29 November 2014 13	Schalke 04	4–1	Mainz 05	Gelsenkirchen
15:30 CET (UTC+01:00)	Huntelaar 9', 25', 61'; Barnetta 54'; Höger (yellow card) 66'; Neustädter (yellow card) 78'	Report	Okazaki 44'; Jara (yellow card) 81'	Stadium: Veltins-Arena; Attendance: 60,904; Referee: Günter Perl

7 December 2014 14	Hamburger SV	2–1	Mainz 05	Hamburg
15:30 CET (UTC+01:00)	Cléber 32'; Van der Vaart 54' (pen.); Rudņevs (yellow card) 78'	Report	Okazaki 89'	Stadium: Volksparkstadion; Attendance: 45,968; Referee: Sascha Stegemann

13 December 2014 15	Mainz 05	1–1	VfB Stuttgart	Mainz
18:30 CET (UTC+01:00)	Geis 36'; Jairo (yellow card) 56'; Đuričić (yellow card) 89'	Report	Hloušek (yellow card) 45+1'; Ginczek (yellow card) 58'; Kostić 72'	Stadium: Coface Arena; Attendance: 29,279; Referee: Bastian Dankert

16 December 2014 16	1. FC Köln	0–0	Mainz 05	Cologne
20:00 CET (UTC+01:00)	Vogt (yellow card) 48'; Lehmann (yellow card) 69'	Report	Geis (yellow card) 48'; Díaz (yellow card) 63'; Brosinski (yellow card) 76'; Koo (yellow card) 78'	Stadium: RheinEnergieStadion; Attendance: 42,900; Referee: Florian Meyer

19 December 2014 17	Mainz 05	1–2	Bayern Munich	Mainz
20:30 CET (UTC+01:00)	Soto 21', (yellow card) 48'; Koo (yellow card) 60'	Report	Schweinsteiger 24'; Robben 90'	Stadium: Coface Arena; Attendance: 34,000; Referee: Felix Zwayer

31 January 2015 18	Mainz 05	5–0	SC Paderborn	Mainz
15:30 CET (UTC+01:00)	Mallı 6', 46' de Blasis 69'; Allagui 82'; Geis 87' (pen.)	Report	Rafa (yellow card) 32'	Stadium: Coface Arena; Attendance: 27,114; Referee: Robert Hartmann

3 February 2015 19	Hannover 96	1–1	Mainz 05	Hanover
20:00 CET (UTC+01:00)	Briand 26'; Sané (yellow card) 52'	Report	Soto 77'; Jara (yellow card) 88'	Stadium: Niedersachsenstadion; Attendance: 30,500; Referee: Thorsten Kinhöfer

7 February 2015 20	Mainz 05	0–2	Hertha BSC	Mainz
15:30 CET (UTC+01:00)	Karius (red card) 32'; Jara (yellow card) 41'; Baumgartlinger (yellow card) 84'	Report	Skjelbred (yellow card) 4'; Hegeler 35' (pen.); Beerens 42'; Lustenberger (yellow card) 54' (yellow-red card) 58'; Schieber (yellow card) 55'; Wagner (yellow card) 85'	Stadium: Coface Arena; Attendance: 26,756; Referee: Deniz Aytekin

13 February 2015 21	Borussia Dortmund	4–2	Mainz 05	Dortmund
20:30 CET (UTC+01:00)	Subotić 49'; Reus 55'; Aubameyang 71'; Şahin 78'	Report	Soto 1'; Brosinski (yellow card) 48'; Mallı 56'	Stadium: Westfalenstadion; Attendance: 80,200; Referee: Tobias Stieler

21 February 2015 22	Mainz 05	3–1	Eintracht Frankfurt	Mainz
15:30 CET (UTC+01:00)	Clemens 38'; Geis 47'; Mallı 50'; Brosinski (yellow card) 62'; Bungert (yellow card) 68'	Report	Lucas Piazon (yellow card) 33'; Aigner 35', (yellow card) 81'; Zambrano (yellow card) 52' (yellow-red card) 83'; Seferovic (yellow card) 59'	Stadium: Coface Arena; Attendance: 33,237; Referee: Felix Brych

28 February 2015 23	1899 Hoffenheim	2–0	Mainz 05	Sinsheim
15:30 CET (UTC+01:00)	Kim (yellow card) 13'; Salihović (yellow card) 41'; Volland 55'; Polanski (yellow card) 68', (goal) 76'	Report		Stadium: Rhein-Neckar Arena; Attendance: 24,310; Referee: Peter Sippel

7 March 2015 24	Mainz 05	2–2	Borussia Mönchengladbach	Mainz
15:30 CET (UTC+01:00)	Geis 73'; Okazaki 77'; Hofmann (yellow card) 80'	Report	Raffael 27', 67'; Xhaka (yellow card) 72'; Wendt (yellow card) 80'	Stadium: Coface Arena; Attendance: 34,000; Referee: Knut Kircher

14 March 2015 25	FC Augsburg	0–2	Mainz 05	Augsburg
15:30 CET (UTC+01:00)		Report	Okazaki 32'; Koo 89'	Stadium: SGL arena Attendance: 28,359; Referee: Knut Kircher

22 March 2015 26	Mainz 05	1–1	VfL Wolfsburg	Mainz
15:30 CET (UTC+01:00)	Bungert 7'	Report	Luiz Gustavo 61', (yellow card) 66'; Arnold (yellow card) 83'	Stadium: Coface Arena; Attendance: 32,236; Referee: Wolfgang Stark

4 April 2015 27	Werder Bremen	0–0	Mainz 05	Bremen
15:30 CEST (UTC+02:00)	Di Santo (yellow card) 15'; Vestergaard (yellow card) 29'; Prödl (yellow card) 58'; Bargfrede (yellow card) 87'	Report	Baumgartlinger (yellow card) 68'; Bungert (yellow card) 79'	Stadium: Weserstadion; Attendance: 41,000; Referee: Michael Weiner

11 April 2015 28	Mainz 05	2–3	Bayer Leverkusen	Mainz
15:30 CEST (UTC+02:00)	Soto (yellow card) 70'; Koo 78' (pen.), 90+1' (pen.)	Report	Son 15'; Wendell (yellow card) 28'; Jedvaj (yellow card) 35'; Kießling 59'; Çalhanoğlu 73'	Stadium: Coface Arena; Attendance: 31,578; Referee: Guido Winkmann

18 April 2015 29	SC Freiburg	2–3	Mainz 05	Freiburg im Breisgau
15:30 CEST (UTC+02:00)	Mehmedi 81'; Krmaš (yellow card) 83'; Schmid 90+1'	Report	Park (yellow card) 34'; Okazaki 39', 45+1'; Mallı 83'	Stadium: Dreisamstadion; Attendance: 24,000; Referee: Sascha Stegemann

24 April 2015 30	Mainz 05	2–0	Schalke 04	Mainz
20:30 CEST (UTC+02:00)	Bell 28', 31'	Report	Neustädter (yellow card) 40'; Kolašinac (yellow card) 77'	Stadium: Coface Arena; Attendance: 34,000; Referee: Robert Hartmann

3 May 2015 31	Mainz 05	1–2	Hamburger SV	Mainz
15:30 CEST (UTC+02:00)	Bungert (yellow card) 46'; Baumgartlinger (yellow card) 53'; Mallı 76' de Blasis (yellow card) 80'; Brosinski (red card) 89'; Allagui (yellow card) 90+2'	Report	Baumgartlinger 37' (o.g.); Olić (yellow card) 50'; Kačar (yellow card) 81', (goal) 87'	Stadium: Coface Arena; Attendance: 34,000; Referee: Peter Sippel

9 May 2015 32	VfB Stuttgart	2–0	Mainz 05	Stuttgart
18:30 CEST (UTC+02:00)	Klein (yellow card) 3'; Didavi 66', (yellow card) 68'; Kostić 78'	Report	Noveski (yellow card) 14'	Stadium: Mercedes-Benz Arena; Attendance: 54,300; Referee: Michael Weiner

16 May 2015 33	Mainz 05	2–0	1. FC Köln	Mainz
15:30 CEST (UTC+02:00)	Noveski (yellow card) 27'; Koo 47'; Jairo 83'	Report	Vogt (yellow card) 60'; Deyverson (yellow card) 72'; Mavraj (yellow card) 84'	Stadium: Coface Arena; Attendance: 33,702; Referee: Günter Perl

23 May 2015 34	Bayern Munich	2–0	Mainz 05	Munich
15:30 CEST (UTC+02:00)	Lewandowski 25' (pen.); Schweinsteiger 48'	Report		Stadium: Allianz Arena; Attendance: 75,000; Referee: Thorsten Kinhöfer

=== DFB-Pokal ===
15 August 2014 Round 1	Chemnitzer FC	5–5 (a.e.t.) (5–4 p)	Mainz 05	Chemnitz
19:00 CEST (UTC+02:00)	Fink 50', 53'; Poggenberg (yellow card) 75'; Hofrath (yellow card) 84'; Bungert 87' (o.g.); Ziereis 103'; Kehl-Gómez (yellow card) 118' (goal) 119'; Garbuschewski (yellow card) 120+1'	Report	Zimling 24'; Okazaki 49'; Koo 73'; Bungert 109'; Geis (yellow card) 118' (goal) 120+2'	Stadium: Stadion an der Gellertstraße; Attendance: 10,000; Referee: Patrick Ittrich
	Penalties
	Garbuschewski (penalty scored); Türpitz (penalty scored); Hofrath (penalty scored); Kehl-Gómez (penalty scored); Fink (penalty scored)		(penalty scored) Geis; (penalty scored) Koo; (penalty missed) Jara; (penalty scored) Park; (penalty scored) Brosinski

=== UEFA Europa League ===
==== Third qualifying round ====
31 July 2014 First leg	Mainz 05 (Germany)	1–0	(Greece) Asteras Tripolis	Mainz, Germany
20:30 CEST (UTC+02:00)	Okazaki 45'; Noveski (yellow card) 90+1'	Report	Goian (yellow card) 69'	Stadium: Coface Arena; Attendance: 18,287; Referee: Jorge Sousa (Portugal)

7 August 2014 Second leg	Asteras Tripolis (Greece)	3–1 (3–2 agg.)	(Germany) Mainz 05	Tripoli, Greece
20:15 CEST (UTC+02:00)	de Blasis 30'; Panteliadis (yellow card) 38'; Mazza (yellow card) 58', (goal) 68', 86'; Lluy (yellow card) 58'	Report	Baumgartlinger (yellow card) 23'; Koo 39'; Noveski (yellow card) 44'; Moritz (yellow card) 56'	Stadium: Theodoros Kolokotronis Stadium; Attendance: 3,659; Referee: Serge Gumienny (Belgium)

== Statistics ==
=== Goalscorers ===
This includes all competitive matches. The list is sorted by shirt number when total goals are equal.

Rank	Pos	No.	Nat	Name	Bundesliga	DFB-Pokal	Europa League	Total
1	FW	23	(Japan)	Shinji Okazaki	5	1	1	7
2	MF	13	(South Korea)	Koo Ja-cheol	1	1	1	3
3	MF	6	(Germany)	Johannes Geis	0	1	0	1
3	MF	9	(Tunisia)	Sami Allagui	1	0	0	1
3	DF	26	(Germany)	Niko Bungert	0	1	0	1
3	MF	31	(Germany)	Jonas Hofmann	1	0	0	1
3	MF		(Denmark)	Niki Zimling	0	1	0	1
TOTALS					8	5	2	15

† denotes players that left the club during the season
Last updated on 24 September 2014
