= Maximilian Oesterhelweg =

German footballer (born 1990)

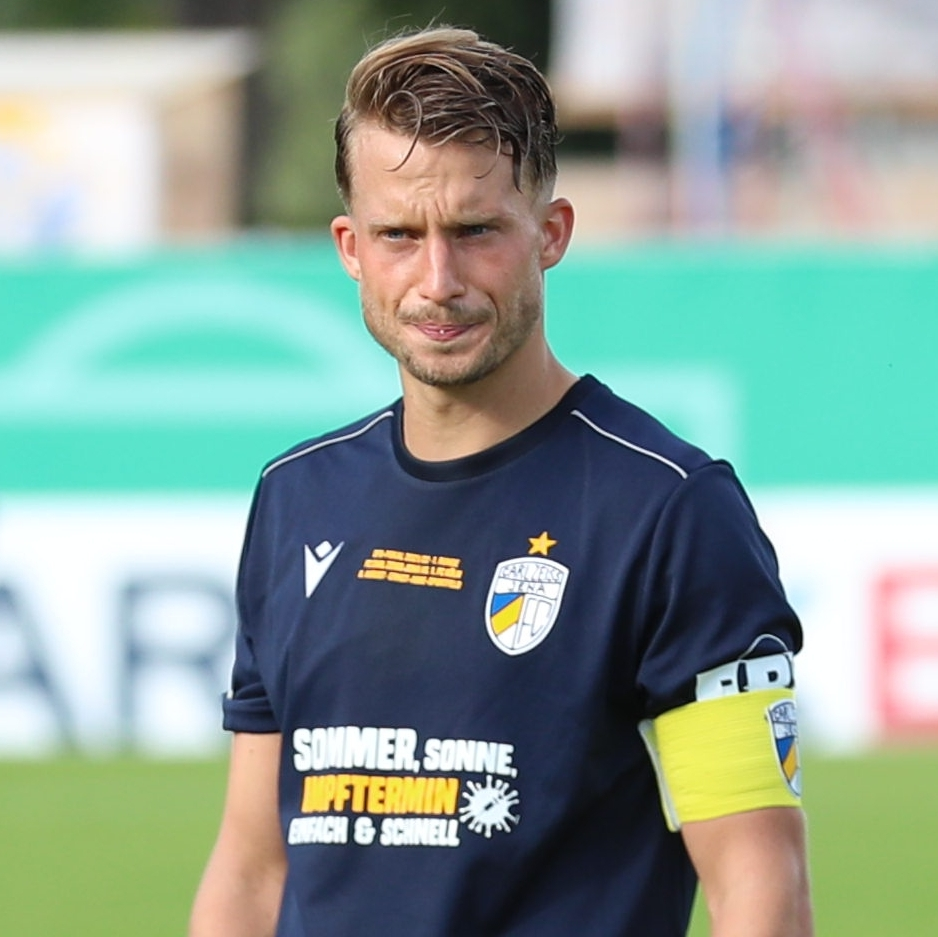
- Maximilian Oesterhelweg (2021)

Personal information
- Date of birth: 21 July 1990 (age 36)
- Place of birth: Gütersloh, Germany
- Height: 1.80 m (5 ft 11 in)
- Position: Winger

Youth career
- Gütersloher TV
- –2008: Gütersloh 2000

Senior career*
Years	Team	Apps	(Gls)
2008–2011	Wiedenbrück 2000	46	(3)
2011–2013	FSV Frankfurt II	61	(7)
2013–2014	Eintracht Frankfurt II	19	(8)
2014–2015	VfR Aalen	6	(0)
2014–2015	VfR Aalen II	2	(0)
2015–2017	SV Elversberg	61	(20)
2017–2019	Sportfreunde Lotte	68	(13)
2020	Chemnitzer FC	7	(0)
2020–2022	Carl Zeiss Jena	49	(12)
2022–2025	Energie Cottbus	52	(8)
- * Club domestic league appearances and goals as of 24 May 2025

Maximilian Oesterhelweg (born 21 July 1990) is a German professional footballer who plays as a winger. He started his senior career at Wiedenbrück 2000, and has subsequently played for FSV Frankfurt II, Eintracht Frankfurt II, VfR Aalen, VfR Aalen II, SV Elversberg, Sportfreunde Lotte, Chemnitzer FC, Carl Zeiss Jena and Energie Cottbus.

== Club career ==
=== Early career ===
Born in Gütersloh, Oesterhelweg played youth football for Gütersloher TV and Gütersloh 2000 before joining Wiedenbrück 2000 in 2008. He made his debut for Wiedenbrück on 7 August 2010 in a 1–0 win at Fortuna Düsseldorf before going on to make 18 appearances that season, though he did not score.

=== FSV Frankfurt II and Eintracht Frankfurt II ===
In the summer of 2011, Oesterholweg joined FSV Frankfurt II on a one-year contract with the option of a further year. His debut for FSV Frankfurt II came on 7 August 2011 in a 1–0 defeat at TSG 1899 Hoffenheim II, whilst the first goal of his senior career came two games later in a 3–1 defeat at Hessen Kassel. Over the course of the 2011–12 season, he was a regular player at FSV Frankfurt II, stating that he felt 'very comfortable at the club'. He made 30 appearances over the course of the season, scoring four times.

=== VfR Aalen ===
On 30 January 2014, one day before the transfer deadline, Oesterhelweg joined 2. Bundesliga club VfR Aalen on a one-and-a-half-year contract. He made 3 appearances for Aalen across the 2013–14 season, and made just 4 appearances in all competitions in the 2014–15 season leading to his departure at the end of his contract.

=== SV Elversberg ===
Oesterhelweg joined Regionalliga Südwest side SV Elversberg in the summer of 2015, and was part of the team that finished second, having scored 7 goals in 27 appearances across the regular part of the 2015–16 season. Despite a goal from Oesterhelweg to tie the opening promotion play-off match against FSV Zwickau, Elversberg lost the second leg 1–0, thus remaining in the Regionalliga Südwest for the following season. After 13 goals in 34 appearances for Oesterhelweg, Elversberg finished top of the Regionalliga Südwest in 2016–17, but again lost out in the promotion play-offs, this time to SpVgg Unterhaching.

=== Sportfreunde Lotte ===
Oesterhelweg joined Sportfreunde Lotte in the summer of 2017, making his debut on 22 July 2019 in a 2–0 defeat at home to Hansa Rostock, before scoring his first goal for the club on their eleventh game of the season at home to Hallescher FC. Oesterhelweg performed well that season, scoring 8 goals in 31 league games. The 2018–19 season saw Oesterhelweg play regularly, appearing in all but one of their league matches that season, though he was released following the expiration of his contract at the end of the season.

=== Chemnitzer FC ===
Having been a free agent since the summer, Oesterhelweg had a trial spell at 1860 Munich, before joining Chemnitzer FC in January 2020, after a trial spell at the club. Oesterhelweg made his debut three days later on 1 February 2020, coming on as a half-time substitute for Tarsis Bonga in a 2–1 victory at SV Meppen. He appeared in seven league matches for the club.

=== Carl Zeiss Jena ===
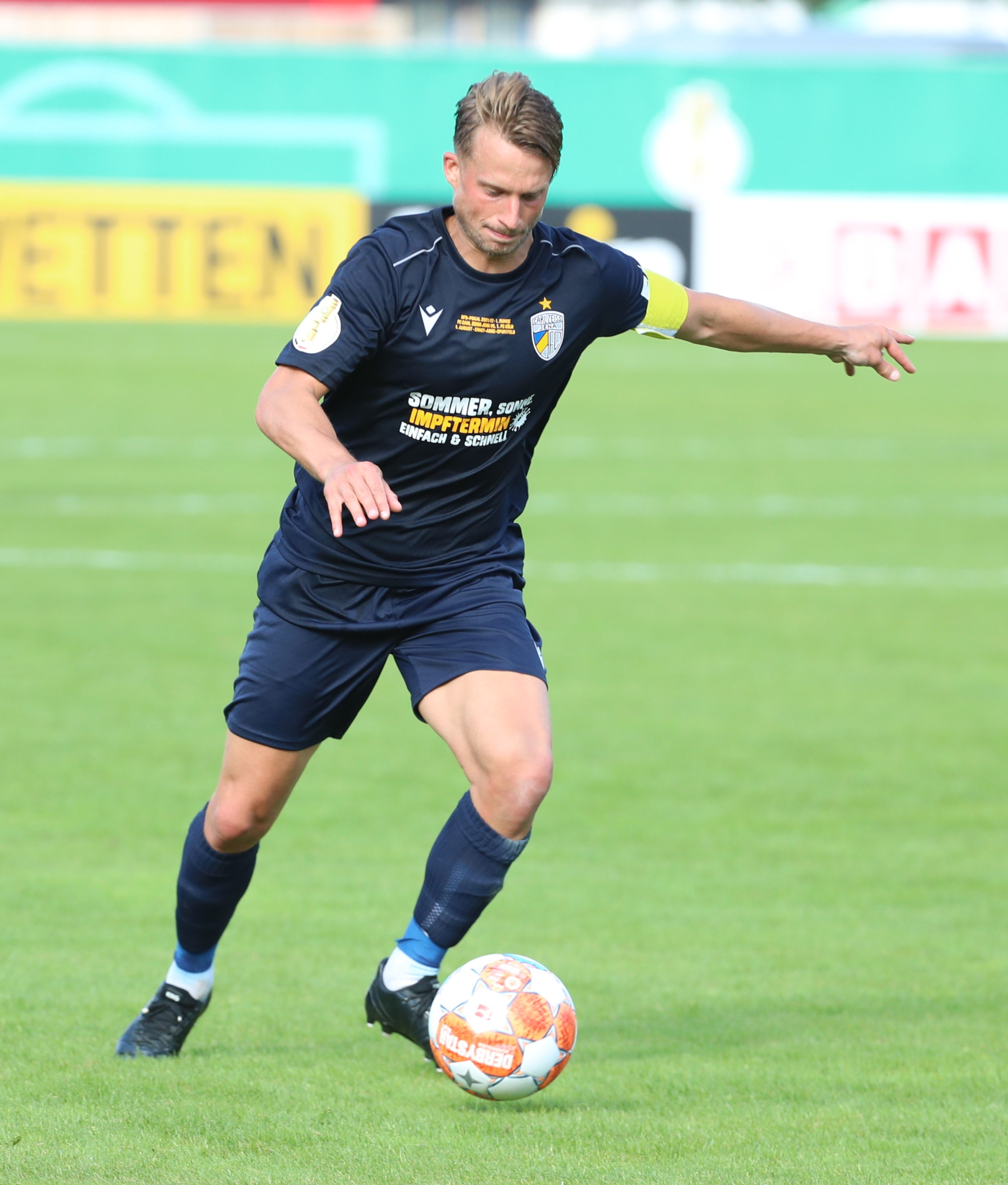
Maximilian Oesterhelweg with Jena in 2021

He joined Regionalliga Nordost side Carl Zeiss Jena on a year-long contract in August 2020. He scored his first goal for Jena after eleven minutes on his debut for the club on 15 August 2020 in a 1–1 draw with Babelsberg.
