= Julian Börner =

German footballer (born 1991)

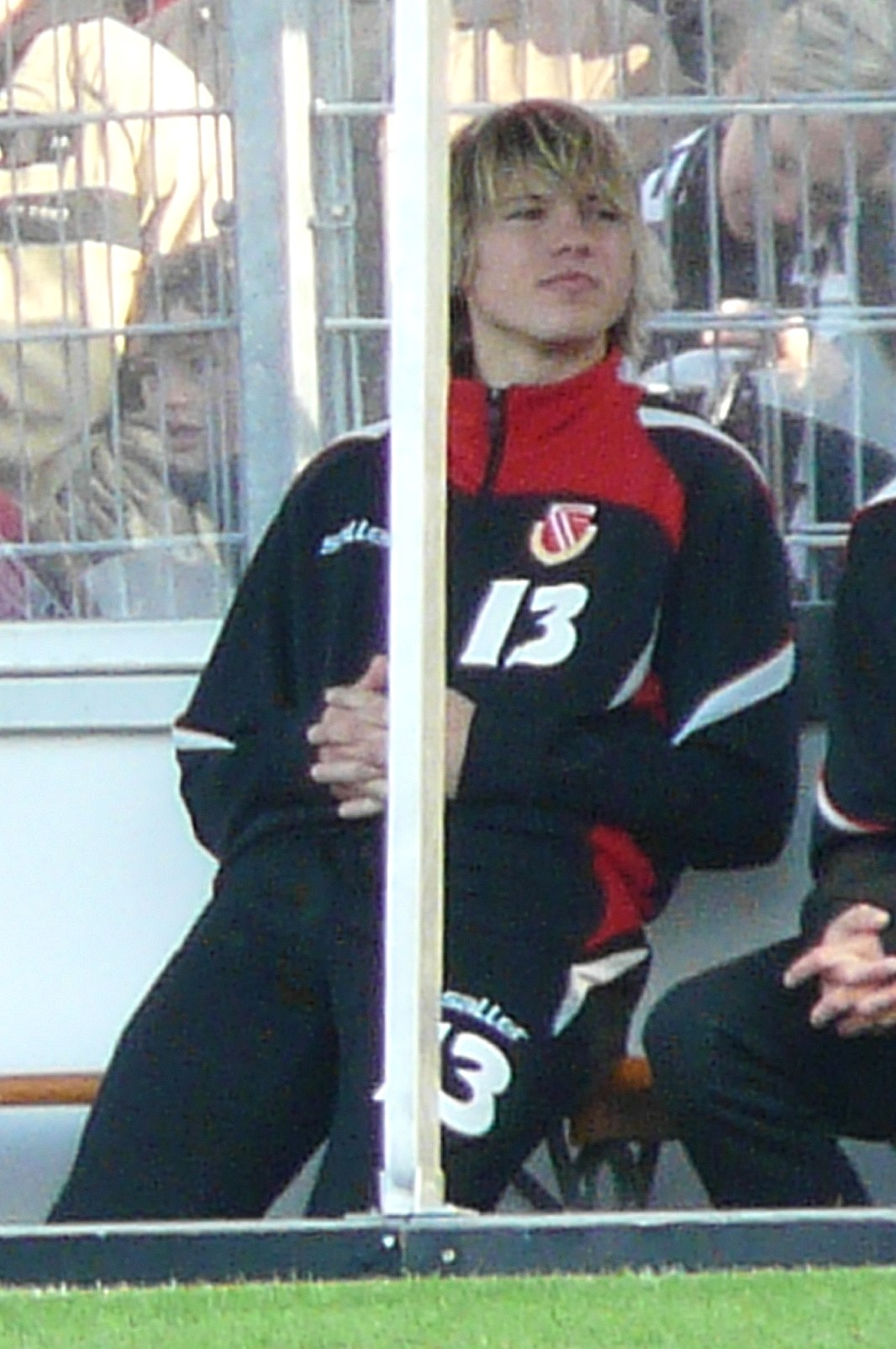
- Börner with Energie Cottbus in 2009

Personal information
- Full name: Julian Börner
- Date of birth: 21 January 1991 (age 35)
- Place of birth: Weimar, Germany
- Height: 1.88 m (6 ft 2 in)
- Position: Defender

Youth career
- 1996–1998: SC Weimar
- 1998–2001: Vimaria Weimar
- 2001–2009: Rot-Weiß Erfurt

Senior career*
Years	Team	Apps	(Gls)
2009–2014	Energie Cottbus II	22	(3)
2009–2014	Energie Cottbus	37	(1)
2014–2019	Arminia Bielefeld	134	(17)
2019–2021	Sheffield Wednesday	63	(4)
2021–2024	Hannover 96	56	(3)
2024	Hannover 96 II	1	(0)

International career^{‡}
2006–2007	Germany U16	7	(0)
2008	Germany U17	2	(0)
2009	Germany U18	2	(0)
- * Club domestic league appearances and goals as of 2 July 2024 ‡ National team caps and goals as of 20 January 2016

Julian Börner (born 21 January 1991) is a German professional footballer who plays as a defender.

After playing youth football for SC Weimar, Vimaria Weimar and Rot-Weiß Erfurt, he made his debut in professional football for Energie Cottbus in the 2. Bundesliga in August 2009, but did not make his next appearance for the club for over two years. He suffered relegation to the 3. Liga with Cottbus in 2014 and signed for fellow 3. Liga club Arminia Bielefeld in June 2014. He was promoted to the 2. Bundesliga in his first season with the club an appointed club captain in summer 2017. He transferred to English Championship club Sheffield Wednesday in 2019.

== Club career ==
=== Early career ===
Born in Weimar, Börner played youth football for SC Weimar (1996–1998), Vimaria Weimar (1998–2001) and Rot-Weiß Erfurt (2001–2009). In August 2009, he signed for 2. Bundesliga club Energie Cottbus on a three-year deal. He made his debut for the club and only appearance of the 2009–10 season as a substitute in a 3–1 home defeat to Greuther Fürth on 23 August 2009. He failed to make a first team appearance during the 2010–11 season, but did appear twice for the reserve team in the Regionalliga Nord. Having suffered from multiple injury problems during his first two seasons at the club, he made his second first-team appearance as a starter in a 0–0 draw with FC Ingolstadt 04 on 27 November 2011, before being substituted in the 67th-minute. During the 2011–12 season, he made 4 first-team appearances during the and 11 reserve team appearances, scoring twice for the reserve team. In March 2012, Börner extended his contract with the club by a further two years.

Börner scored his first goal in the 2. Bundesliga on 24 November 2012 with the club's second goal of a 3–1 win over Eintracht Braunschweig. He received the first red card of his career on 24 February 2013 for a challenge on Ramon Machado, resulting in a three-match ban. On 29 March 2013, his contract with the club was extended to 30 March 2016. He returned to first team action on 21 April 2013 for a 1–0 defeat to Dynamo Dresden, but was again sent off for a foul on Filip Trojan. Börner scored once in 15 first-team appearances during the 2012–13 season, whilst he scored one goal in 9 matches for the reserve team. Börner featured in the first nine matches of the 2013–14 season before dropping out of the matchday squad, returning to the starting line-up for the 16th matchday. He was sent off against SV Sandhausen in the 20th matchday, before returning for the final two matches of the season, with Börner making 18 appearances in all competitions as Cottbus finished bottom of the 2. Bundesliga and were relegated to the 3. Liga.

=== Arminia Bielefeld ===
In June 2014, Börner signed for fellow relegated 3. Liga side Arminia Bielefeld on a one-year deal. He made his debut for the club on 26 July 2014, starting in the opening match of the season as Bielefeld won 2–1 away at Mainz 05 II. He scored his first goal for the club on 27 August 2014 with a headed goal in a 1–1 draw against MSV Duisburg, before scoring his second goal for the club the following week in a 4–2 win over Stuttgarter Kickers. He received his first sending off for the club on 28 September 2014 for a challenge on Manuel Zeitz in a 1–1 draw with Energie Cottbus, with the sending off resulting in a three-match ban. Across the 2014–15 season, he scored 4 goals in 25 league matches as Bielefeld finished top of the 3. Liga and were promoted back to the 2. Bundesliga. He also made 4 appearances in the 2014–15 DFB-Pokal as the club were eliminated in the semi-final following a 4–0 defeat to VfL Wolfsburg.

Börner started 17 of Bielefeld's 19 matches prior to the winter break. On 6 January 2016, his contract with the club was extended until 2019. He scored his first goal of the season on 28 February 2016 with the final goal of a 3–2 defeat to 1. FC Heidenheim, before scoring his second and final goal of the season against Greuther Fürth on 24 April 2016. He made 31 2. Bundesliga appearances and 1 DFB-Pokal appearance over the course of the 2015–16 season. It took Börner until the 23rd matchday to score his first goal of the 2016–17 season, but he scored 5 goals in the final 11 matches of the season as the club finished 15th, avoiding the relegation play-offs by one point and automatic relegation by three points. The 2016–17 season saw Börner score 5 times across 30 matches in all competitions.

In summer 2017, he became club captain at Arminia, narrowly beating previous captain Fabian Klos in a vote amongst the playing squad. During the 2017–18 season, Börner played 28 times and scored 4 goals, and scored 3 goals in 27 matches in the 2018–19 season. Despite a verbal agreement that Börner would sign a new contract with the club, he rejected the offer of a new contract with a view to playing football in England.

=== Sheffield Wednesday ===
On 10 July 2019, Börner joined Championship club Sheffield Wednesday on a contract of undisclosed length following his departure from Arminia Bielefeld, and made his debut for the club on 3 August 2019, starting in the club's 3–1 away victory over Reading. He scored his first goal for the club on 18 October 2019 with a 19th-minute volley in a 1–1 draw with Cardiff City. He was nominated for the Championship Player of the Month award for October 2019, though the award was instead given to Aleksandar Mitrović of Fulham. Despite missing out on the award, Börner was praised by manager Garry Monk, who claimed that "how he has handled that transition [to English football] has been really impressive". Prior to the suspension of the campaign in March 2020 due to the COVID-19 pandemic, Börner had made 33 appearances and scored 1 goal, and made a further 7 appearances without scoring during the remainder of the 2019–20 season.

Sheffield Wednesday were deducted 12 points for the 2020–21 season, though that was reduced to six points after an appeal. It took Börner until 24 October 2020 to make his first league appearance of the season, but he then held down a regular first team place due to injuries to the club's other centre-backs. He suffered a facial injury in the club's 2–0 defeat to Huddersfield Town on 8 December 2020, returning from injury for the club's 3–0 FA Cup defeat to Everton on 24 January 2021. He was sent off for the first time for Wednesday on 6 March 2021 in a 3–0 defeat to Reading for a foul on George Pușcaș in the penalty area, with Reading converting the resulting penalty to score the first goal of the match. He scored three goals in his final 8 matches of the season, including one on the final day to put Wednesday 3–2 up in an eventual 3–3 draw against Derby County, with Wednesday suffering relegation to League One, finishing 24th, as a result of their failure to win. On 7 June 2021, Bild said that Börner would be joining 2. Bundesliga club, Hannover 96 on a free transfer, despite him still having a year of his Sheffield Wednesday contract remaining. On 23 June 2021, Hannover 96 announced that Börner had signed a contract with them, however Wednesday had not yet given him clearance in signing for them with reports that Wednesday wanted a fee for the player.

=== Hannover 96 ===
On 2 August 2021, Börner completed a move to German side Hannover 96 for an undisclosed fee.

In April 2023, Börner signed a contract extension with the club, valid until 2025. As part of the contract, he would remain with their first team for the 2023–24 season, before moving to their reserve team in the 2024–25 season. However, on 2 July 2024, he announced that he terminated his contract with the club, stating that he felt he wouldn't be able to support the team at the level that he would have wanted to due to ongoing ankle joint problems and did not want to occupy a spot on the squad due to this.

== International career ==
Börner is a German youth international, having represented his country at under-16, under-17 and under-18 level.

== Style of play ==
Börner plays as a left-sided central defender but can also play as a central midfielder. His style of play has been described as "no-nonsense".

== Personal life ==
He is married to former footballer Kristina Börner and their daughter Emma was born in May 2017.

== Career statistics ==
As of 1 July 2024

Appearances and goals by club, season and competition
Club	Season	League			National Cup		League Cup		Other		Total	
Club	Season	Division	Apps	Goals	Apps	Goals	Apps	Goals	Apps	Goals	Apps	Goals
Energie Cottbus	2009–10	2. Bundesliga	1	0	0	0	—		—		1	0
Energie Cottbus	2010–11	2. Bundesliga	0	0	0	0	—		—		0	0
Energie Cottbus	2011–12	2. Bundesliga	4	0	0	0	—		—		4	0
Energie Cottbus	2012–13	2. Bundesliga	15	1	0	0	—		—		15	1
Energie Cottbus	2013–14	2. Bundesliga	16	0	2	0	—		—		18	0
Energie Cottbus	Total		36	1	2	0	—		—		38	1
Energie Cottbus II	2010–11	Regionalliga Nord	2	0	—		—		—		2	0
Energie Cottbus II	2011–12	Regionalliga Nord	11	2	—		—		—		11	2
Energie Cottbus II	2012–13	Regionalliga Nord	9	1	—		—		—		9	1
Energie Cottbus II	Total		22	3	—		—		—		22	3
Arminia Bielefeld	2014–15	3. Liga	25	4	4	0	—		—		29	4
Arminia Bielefeld	2015–16	2. Bundesliga	31	2	1	0	—		—		32	2
Arminia Bielefeld	2016–17	2. Bundesliga	26	5	4	0	—		—		30	5
Arminia Bielefeld	2017–18	2. Bundesliga	27	4	1	0	—		—		28	4
Arminia Bielefeld	2018–19	2. Bundesliga	25	3	2	0	—		—		27	3
Arminia Bielefeld	Total		134	18	12	0	—		—		146	18
Sheffield Wednesday	2019–20	EFL Championship	37	1	3	0	—		—		40	1
Sheffield Wednesday	2020–21	EFL Championship	26	3	1	0	3	0	—		30	3
Sheffield Wednesday	Total		63	4	4	0	3	0	0	0	70	4
Hannover 96	2021–22	2. Bundesliga	26	2	3	0	—		—		29	2
Hannover 96	2022–23	2. Bundesliga	26	1	1	0	—		—		27	1
Hannover 96	2023–24	2. Bundesliga	4	0	0	0	—		—		4	0
Hannover 96	Total		56	3	4	0	0	0	0	0	60	3
Hannover 96 II	2023–24	Regionalliga Nord	1	0	—		—		2 (Note: Appearances in 3. Liga promotion play-offs)	0	3	0
Career total			312	29	22	0	3	0	2	0	339	29
