= Guillaume Rippert =

French former footballer (born 1985)

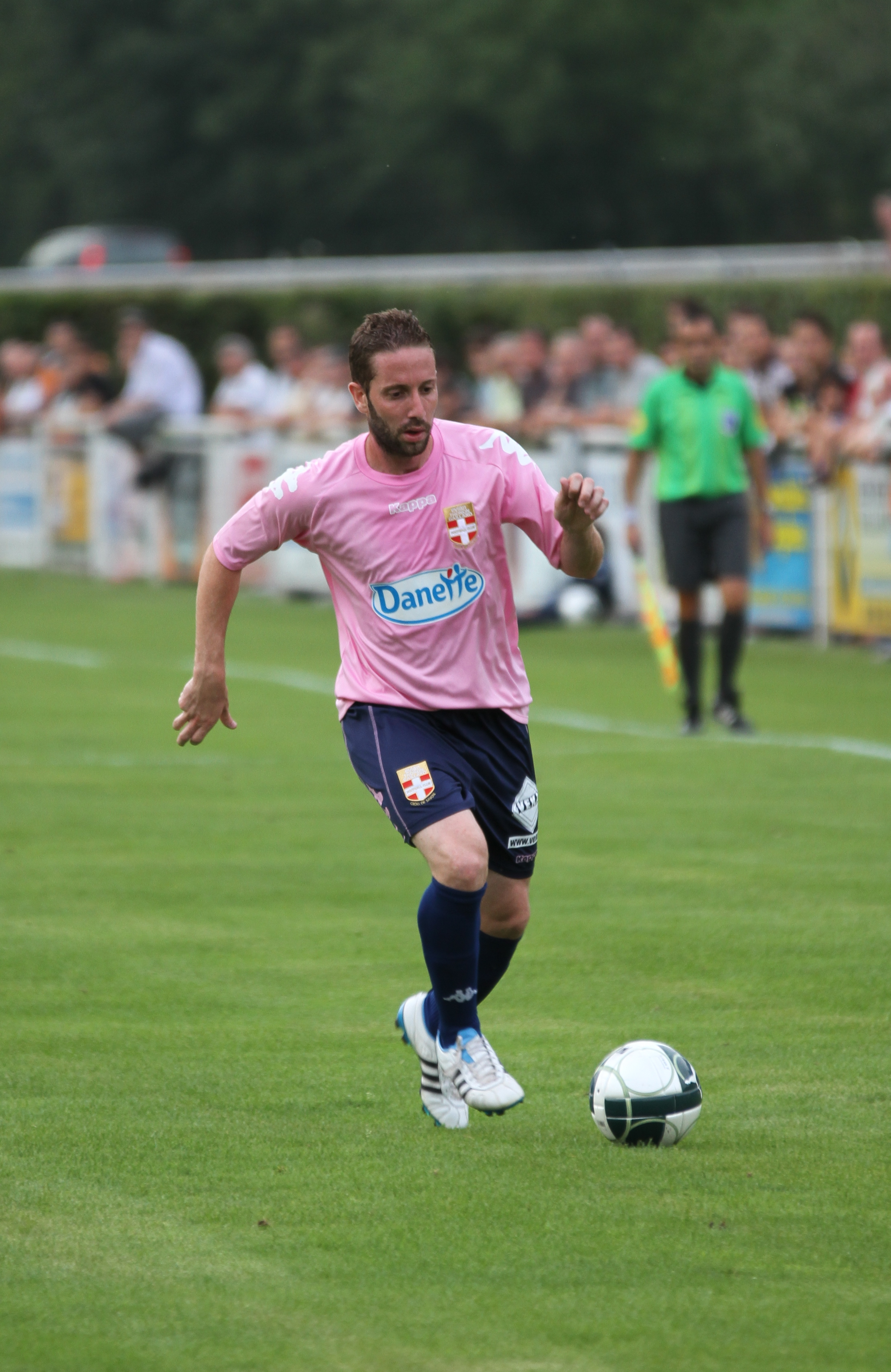

Personal information
- Full name: Guillaume Rippert
- Date of birth: 30 April 1985 (age 41)
- Place of birth: Paris, France
- Height: 1.80 m (5 ft 11 in)
- Positions: Left back; left midfielder

Senior career*
Years	Team	Apps	(Gls)
2004–2005	Nantes	0	(0)
2005–2008	Valenciennes	72	(0)
2008–2009	Metz	17	(0)
2009	Kavala	0	(0)
2009–2012	Evian	45	(1)
2012–2013	Energie Cottbus	8	(0)
2013–2014	Laval	32	(1)
2014–2015	FC Lausanne-Sport	14	(0)
2015	Petrolul Ploiești	7	(0)
2016–	Cholet	54	(0)
Total		249	(2)

International career
2005	France U-21	2	(0)
Medal record
Men's football
Representing France
UEFA European Under-17 Championship
Runner-up	2002 Denmark
- * Club domestic league appearances and goals as of 20 October 2020 (UTC)

Guillaume Rippert (born 30 April 1985, in Paris) is a French former footballer who played as a defender.

== Career ==
In 2006, Rippert was loaned by FC Nantes to Valenciennes. He made his professional debut in Ligue 2 on 5 August 2006. He went on to play 21 games in his first season, as Valenciennes won promotion and the league title. At the end of his loan spell, he elected to stay with Valenciennes rather than return to Nantes. After two season in Ligue 1, and with competition for his place, he agreed a termination of his contract and signed for fellow Ligue 1 side FC Metz.

He was released by Metz after one season in Ligue 1, and joined Greek side Kavala, who were newly promoted to Super League Greece. However, an issue arose with the validity of his three-year contract, and he returned to France.

In September 2009, he signed for Evian to play in Championnat National. He helped the club win back to back titles and promotions and played another season in Ligue 1. For the 2012–13 season, Rippert, along with fellow Evian player Nicolas Farina was loaned to German 2. Bundesliga side FC Energie Cottbus.

After a year in Germany Rippert returned to France with Ligue 2 Stade Lavallois. He then moved to Switzerland, signing for Swiss Challenge League side FC Lausanne-Sport. However, when manager Marco Simone was sacked, the new manager dispensed with the nine French players. Rippert signed for Romanian Liga I side FC Petrolul Ploiești, but he left due to issues with payment of wages.

In January 2016, Rippert and Farina joined up again, at SO Cholet in Championnat de France Amateur, where he won promotion.

== Honours ==
Valenciennes

- Ligue 2: 2005–06

Evian

- Ligue 2: 2010–11
- Championnat National: 2009–10
