= SV Alemannia Waldalgesheim =

German football club

- Full name: SV Alemannia 1910 e.V. Waldalgesheim
- Founded: 1910
- League: Verbandsliga Südwest (VI)
- 2015–16: 4th
Home colours	Away colours

SV Alemannia Waldalgesheim is a German association football club from the city of Waldalgesheim, Rhineland-Palatinate. The team is part of a larger sports club that also has departments for basketball, tennis, and general fitness.

== History ==
Like other clubs throughout the country, Waldalgesheim struggled through World War I, but survived the conflict to become C-Klasse champions on the strength of an undefeated season in 1926–27, and followed up that success with a B-Klasse title the following year. By 1930 the club were owners of their own playing field and were still part of B-Klasse competition before the outbreak of World War II. The first team side suspended operations during the war, while the youth team remained active. SV resumed play in 1946 and by 1950 was playing in the 2. Amateurliga Rheinland (IV). For nearly two decades the club remained in local level A- and B-Klasse competition.

They played in the 2. Amateurliga Rheinhessen and Bezirksliga Rheinhessen through the 70s before backsliding. A return to Bezirksliga play in 1989 was followed by a slow climb up through the Landesliga Südwest/Ost (VI) (1997–2004) into the Verbandsliga Südwest (V) before a second-place result put Waldalgesheim into the Oberliga Südwest for the 2008–09 season.

The club remained at this level for four seasons but was relegated again in 2012 after finishing 17th in the league. It made an immediate return to the Oberliga after a Verbandsliga title in 2013. A South West Cup win in 2013–14 earned the club the right to enter the first round of the 2014–15 DFB-Pokal, the German Cup, for the first time. At the same time however the club was unable to avoid relegation from the Oberliga Rheinland-Pfalz/Saar, dropping back down to the Verbandsliga again in 2014.

The club lost its first ever DFB-Pokal match 6–0 against Bayer Leverkusen on 15 August 2014.

== Honours ==
The club's honours:

=== League ===
- Verbandsliga Südwest (VI)
  - Champions: 2013
  - Runners-up: 2008, 2015
- Landesliga Südwest-Ost (V)
  - Champions: 2004
- Bezirksliga Rheinhessen (VI)
  - Champions: 1997

=== Cup ===
- Southwestern Cup
  - Winners: 2014

== Recent seasons ==
The recent season-by-season performance of the club:

Season	Division	Tier	Position
2003–04	Landesliga Südwest-Ost	VI	1st ↑
2004–05	Verbandsliga Südwest	V	9th
2005–06	Verbandsliga Südwest	V	8th
2006–07	Verbandsliga Südwest	V	2nd
2007–08	Verbandsliga Südwest	V	2nd ↑
2008–09	Oberliga Südwest	V	15th
2009–10	Oberliga Südwest	V	9th
2010–11	Oberliga Südwest	V	12th
2011–12	Oberliga Südwest	V	17th ↓
2012–13	Verbandsliga Südwest	VI	1st ↑
2013–14	Oberliga Rheinland-Pfalz/Saar	V	17th ↓
2014–15	Verbandsliga Südwest	VI	2nd
2015–16	Verbandsliga Südwest	VI	4th
2016–17	Verbandsliga Südwest	VI	

- With the introduction of the Regionalligas in 1994 and the 3. Liga in 2008 as the new third tier, below the 2. Bundesliga, all leagues below dropped one tier. In 2012 the Oberliga Südwest was renamed Oberliga Rheinland-Pfalz/Saar.

↑ Promoted	↓ Relegated

== Stadium ==
The sports field at the Waldstraße has capacity for 2000 spectators.
