= Sascha Traut =

German footballer (born 1985)

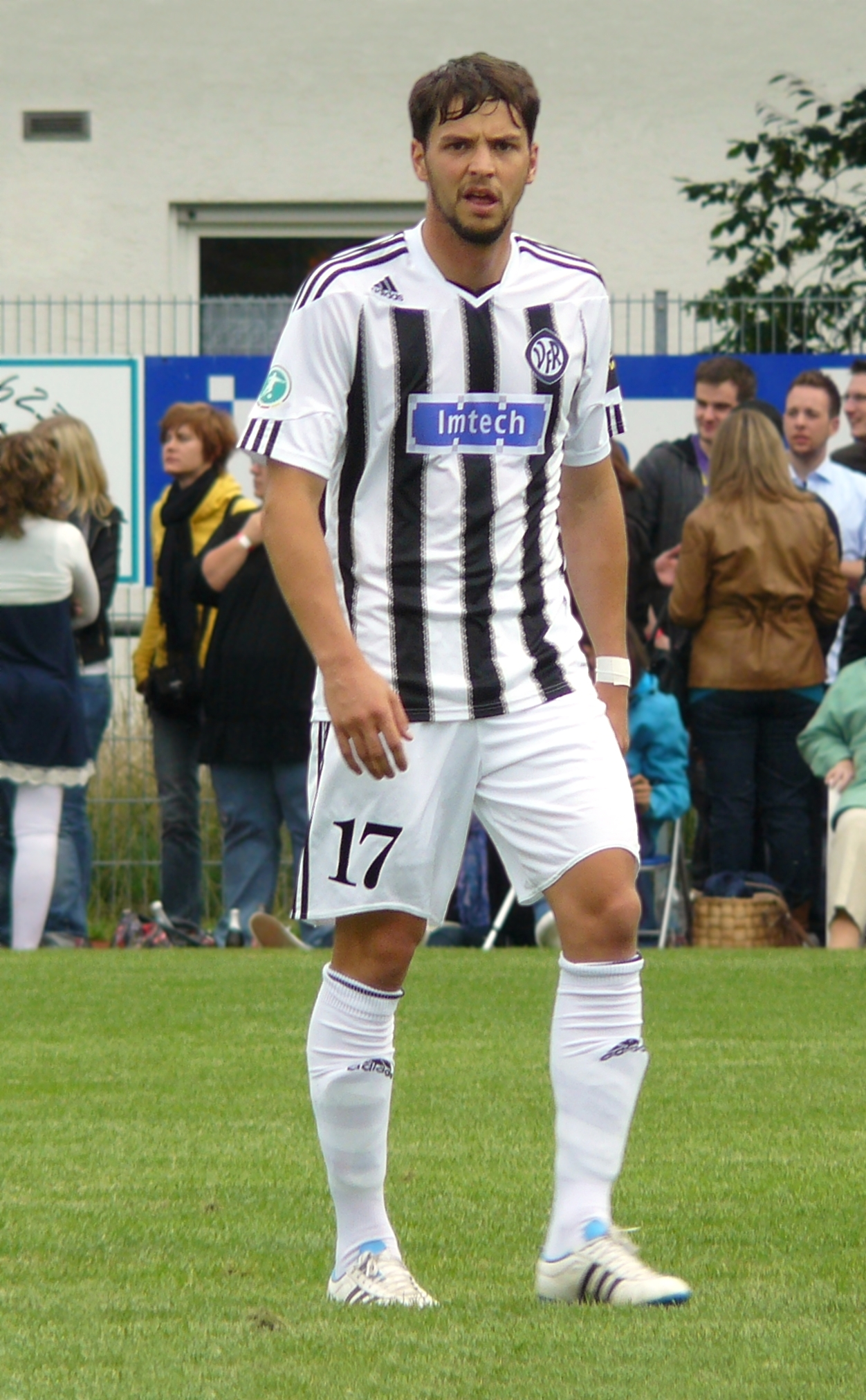
- Traut in 2011 with VfR Aalen

Personal information
- Date of birth: 21 May 1985 (age 41)
- Place of birth: Karlsruhe, West Germany
- Height: 1.83 m (6 ft 0 in)
- Position: Right midfielder

Youth career
- –2000: SG Siemens Karlsruhe
- 2000–2004: Karlsruher SC

Senior career*
Years	Team	Apps	(Gls)
2004–2007	Karlsruher SC II	86	(15)
2005–2007	Karlsruher SC	1	(0)
2007–2008	TuS Koblenz	12	(0)
2008–2009	Stuttgarter Kickers	35	(2)
2009–2010	Wacker Burghausen	30	(0)
2010–2014	VfR Aalen	123	(4)
2014–2016	Karlsruher SC	15	(0)
2016–2017	Würzburger Kickers	6	(0)
2017–2019	VfR Aalen	73	(2)
Total		381	(23)
- * Club domestic league appearances and goals

Sascha Traut (born 21 May 1985) is a German former professional footballer who played as a right midfielder.

== Career ==
On 24 June 2009, he moved for free to SV Wacker Burghausen. On 31 August 2010, he was signed by VfR Aalen. On 6 May 2014, he signed a two-year contract to return to his old club Karlsruher SC.

He left VfR Aalen in summer 2019.

== Honours ==
Karlsruher SC

- 2. Bundesliga: 2006–07

VfR Aalen

- 3. Liga runner-up: 2011–12
