= Robert Lechleiter =

German footballer

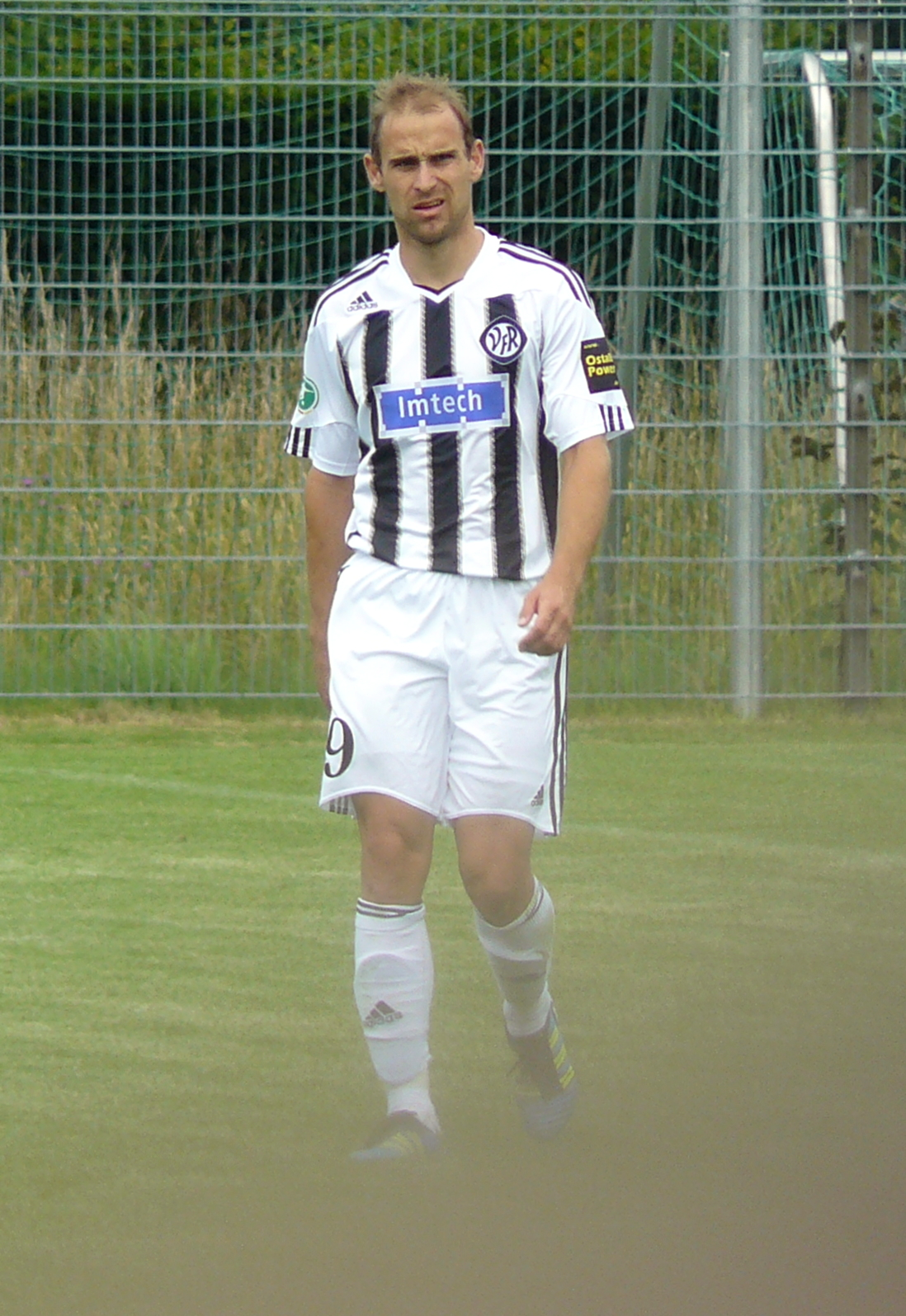
- Lechleiter with VfR Aalen in 2011

Personal information
- Date of birth: 1 July 1980 (age 46)
- Place of birth: Rosenheim, West Germany
- Height: 1.76 m (5 ft 9 in)
- Position: Striker

Youth career
- 1985–1999: TSV Aßling

Senior career*
Years	Team	Apps	(Gls)
1999–2001	SC Baldham		
2001–2003	FC Ismaning	57	(21)
2003–2008	SpVgg Unterhaching	107	(21)
2008–2009	Hansa Rostock	13	(3)
2009–2015	VfR Aalen	167	(48)

Managerial career
- 2025: SSV Ulm
- * Club domestic league appearances and goals

Robert Lechleiter (born 1 July 1980) is a former German professional footballer who played as a striker and last coached SSV Ulm.
