= Christian Müller (footballer, born 1984) =

German footballer

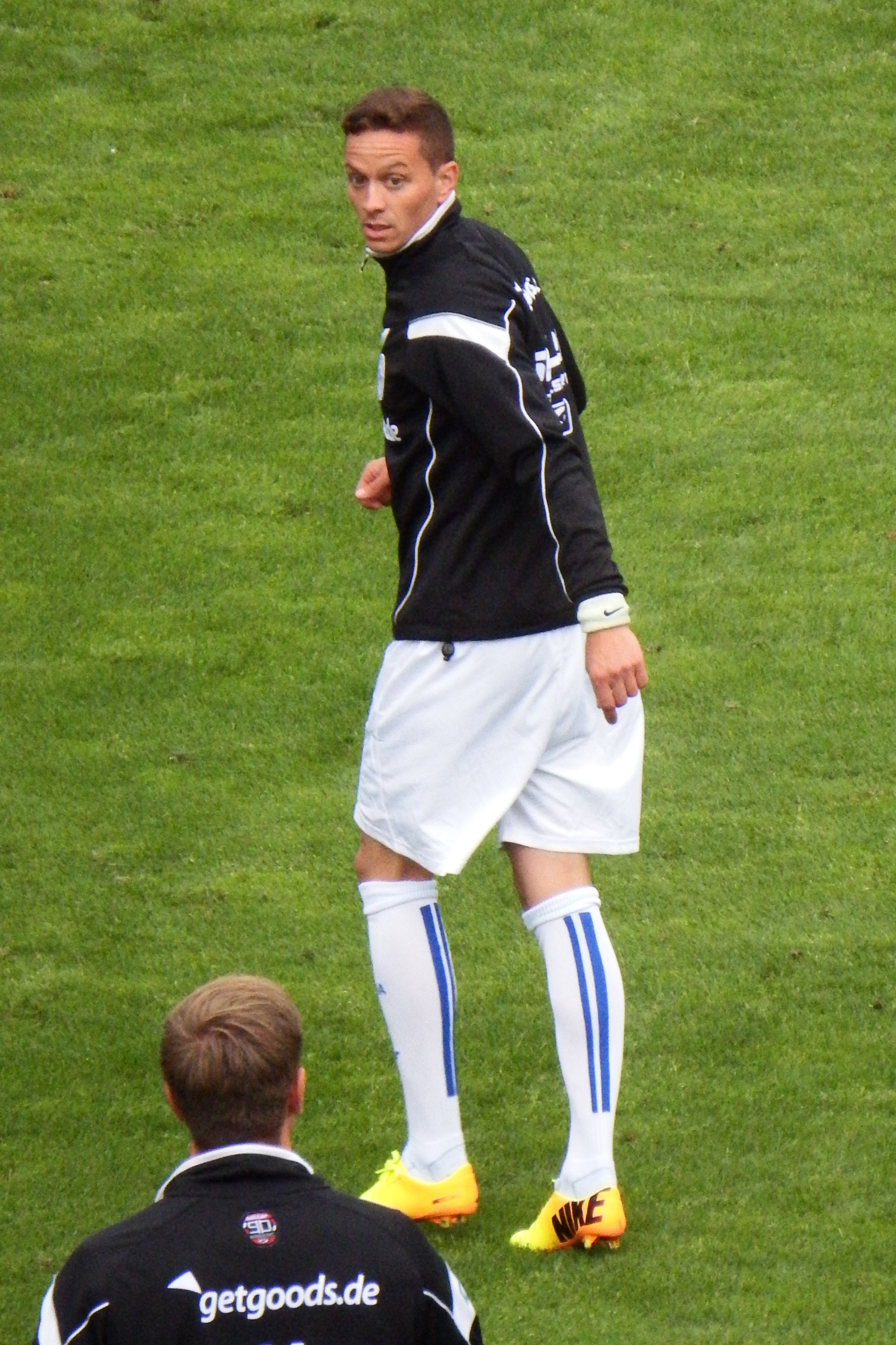
- Müller with Arminia Bielefeld in 2013

Personal information
- Date of birth: 28 February 1984 (age 42)
- Place of birth: Berlin, Germany
- Height: 1.82 m (6 ft 0 in)
- Position: Midfielder

Youth career
- 1990–2001: SV Tasmania-Gropiusstadt 1973
- 2001–2003: Hertha BSC

Senior career*
Years	Team	Apps	(Gls)
2003–2008	Hertha BSC II	64	(12)
2004–2008	Hertha BSC	16	(2)
2008–2009	Energie Cottbus II	25	(3)
2008–2009	Energie Cottbus	1	(0)
2009–2010	TuS Koblenz	13	(0)
2010–2011	Arminia Bielefeld	20	(2)
2011–2012	Energie Cottbus	24	(0)
2012–2016	Arminia Bielefeld	80	(15)
2016	Vasas SC	12	(1)
2017	Preußen Münster	5	(0)
2017–2018	KFC Uerdingen	13	(2)
Total		273	(37)

International career
2004	Germany U-21	1	(0)
- * Club domestic league appearances and goals

Christian Müller (born 28 February 1984) is a German former professional footballer who played as a midfielder.

== Career ==
Born in Berlin, Müller began his footballing career aged six with SV Tasmania-Gropiusstadt 1973. In 2001, he joined Hertha BSC.

On 3 February 2007, Müller played his first Bundesliga match for Hertha BSC against Hamburger SV. On 14 January 2008 he signed for fellow Bundesliga club FC Energie Cottbus. Müller was invited to a trial at FC St. Pauli in May 2009. On 7 July 2009, he signed a contract with TuS Koblenz.

In 2016, he was signed by Hungarian first league team Vasas SC. Only a half year later, in December 2016, he signed for German 3. Liga side Preußen Münster for the second leg of the 2016–17 campaign.

== Career statistics ==
Appearances and goals by club, season and competition
Club	Season	League			Cup		Other^{1}		Total		Ref.
Club	Season	Division	Apps	Goals	Apps	Goals	Apps	Goals	Apps	Goals	Ref.
Hertha BSC II	2003–04	NOFV-Oberliga Nord	21	3	—		—		21	3	
Hertha BSC II	2004–05	Regionalliga Nord	6	0	1	0	—		7	0	
Hertha BSC II	2005–06	Regionalliga Nord	5	0	—		—		5	0	
Hertha BSC II	2006–07	Regionalliga Nord	27	8	—		—		27	8	
Hertha BSC II	2007–08	NOFV-Oberliga Nord	5	1	—		—		5	1	
Hertha BSC II	Total		64	12	1	0	0	0	64	12	—
Hertha BSC	2004–05	Bundesliga	9	2	1	0	—		10	2	
Hertha BSC	2006–07	Bundesliga	6	0	0	0	—		6	0	
Hertha BSC	2007–08	Bundesliga	1	0	1	0	—		2	0	
Hertha BSC	Total		16	2	2	0	0	0	18	2	—
Energie Cottbus	2007–08	Bundesliga	1	0	0	0	—		1	0	
Energie Cottbus II	2007–08	Regionalliga Nord	8	2	—		—		8	2	
Energie Cottbus II	2008–09	Regionalliga Nord	17	1	—		—		17	1	
Energie Cottbus II	Total		25	3	0	0	0	0	25	3	—
TuS Koblenz	2009–10	2. Bundesliga	13	0	3	0	—		16	0	
Arminia Bielefeld	2010–11	2. Bundesliga	20	2	0	0	—		20	2	
Energie Cottbus	2011–12	2. Bundesliga	24	0	1	0	—		25	0	
Arminia Bielefeld	2012–13	3. Liga	19	2	1	0	—		20	2	
Arminia Bielefeld	2013–14	2. Bundesliga	26	3	1	0	2	1	29	4	
Arminia Bielefeld	2014–15	3. Liga	27	10	4	1	—		31	11	
Arminia Bielefeld	2015–16	2. Bundesliga	8	0	1	0	—		9	0	
Arminia Bielefeld	Total		80	15	7	1	2	1	88	17	—
Vasas SC	2015–16	Nemzeti Bajnokság I	12	1	0	0	—		12	1	
Preußen Münster	2016–17	3. Liga	5	0	—		—		5	0	
KFC Uerdingen	2017–18	Regionalliga West	13	2	—		—		13	2	
Career total			273	37	14	1	2	1	289	39	—

- 1.Relegation playoff.
