= Nicolas Farina =

French professional footballer (born 1986)

Personal information
- Date of birth: 9 August 1986 (age 40)
- Place of birth: Metz, France
- Height: 1.68 m (5 ft 6 in)
- Position: Winger

Youth career
- –2005: Metz

Senior career*
Years	Team	Apps	(Gls)
2005–2009	Metz	25	(3)
2007–2008	→ Cannes (loan)	28	(5)
2009–2012	Evian	63	(6)
2012–2014	Energie Cottbus	23	(2)
2015	Racing FC	9	(10)
2015	Petrolul Ploiești	8	(0)
2016–2018	Cholet	59	(6)
Total		215	(32)
- * Club domestic league appearances and goals as of 20 October 2020 (UTC)

Nicolas Farina (born 9 August 1986) is a French former professional footballer who played mainly as a winger.

== Club career ==
Farina began his career at FC Metz and was loaned out to AS Cannes in 2007–08. After a few years with FC Metz, he was released and signed on 2 July 2009 with Évian Thonon Gaillard FC. For the 2012–13 season, Farina, along with fellow Evian player Guillaume Rippert was loaned to German 2. Bundesliga side FC Energie Cottbus. He later signed with Racing FC from the Luxembourg National Division in January 2015.

After a brief spell together in Romania with FC Petrolul Ploiești, Farina and Rippert joined up again in January 2016, at SO Cholet in Championnat de France Amateur, where he won promotion.

== Honours ==
Metz

- Ligue 2: 2006–07

Evian

- Ligue 2: 2010–11
- Championnat National: 2009–10
