= Ali Ibrahimaj =

German footballer

Personal information
- Date of birth: 18 August 1991 (age 35)
- Place of birth: Rüsselsheim, Germany
- Height: 1.80 m (5 ft 11 in)
- Position: Midfielder

Team information
- Current team: VfR Mannheim
- Number: 7

Youth career
- Mainz 05
- Rot-Weiß Walldorf

Senior career*
Years	Team	Apps	(Gls)
–2012	Rot-Weiß Walldorf		
2012	Alemannia Königstädten		
2012–2013	FC Eddersheim	27	(2)
2013–2014	Rot-Weiß Darmstadt	32	(17)
2014–2015	Sportfreunde Siegen	28	(7)
2015–2017	Waldhof Mannheim	61	(6)
2015	Waldhof Mannheim II	1	(0)
2017–2018	SV Sandhausen II	5	(0)
2017–2018	SV Sandhausen	7	(0)
2018–2021	KFC Uerdingen 05	33	(5)
2021	FC Gießen	27	(3)
2021–	VfR Mannheim	32	(27)
- * Club domestic league appearances and goals as of 19 November 2022

Ali Ibrahimaj (born 18 August 1991) is a German professional footballer who plays as a midfielder for VfR Mannheim.

== Personal life ==
Ibrahimaj is of Albanian descent.
