= Zouhair Bouadoud =

French-Moroccan footballer (born 1986)

Personal information
- Date of birth: 12 July 1986 (age 40)
- Place of birth: Strasbourg, France
- Height: 1.86 m (6 ft 1 in)
- Position: Forward

Youth career
- Le Havre

Senior career*
Years	Team	Apps	(Gls)
–2006	Le Havre	0	(0)
2006–2007	Eintracht Trier	18	(11)
2007–2008	Mainz 05 II	21	(9)
2008–2009	VfR Aalen II	4	(3)
2008–2009	VfR Aalen	8	(0)
2009–2010	Wormatia Worms	22	(7)
2010–2011	SV Elversberg II	5	(0)
2010–2012	SV Elversberg	15	(4)
2012–2013	Karlsruher SC II	10	(2)
2013–2015	Sportfreunde Siegen	44	(9)
2014–2015	Sportfreunde Siegen II	4	(2)
2015–2017	AS Calcio Kreuzlingen		
- * Club domestic league appearances and goals

Zouhair Bouadoud (born 12 July 1986) is a French former professional footballer who played as a forward.
