= Dennis Franzin =

German footballer

Personal information
- Full name: Dennis Franzin
- Date of birth: 12 July 1993 (age 33)
- Place of birth: Weinheim, Germany
- Height: 1.69 m (5 ft 7 in)
- Position: Midfielder

Team information
- Current team: FV Nußloch
- Number: 11

Youth career
- VfB Gartenstadt
- –2005: ASV Feudenheim
- 2005–2012: SV Waldhof Mannheim

Senior career*
Years	Team	Apps	(Gls)
2012–2014	SV Waldhof Mannheim	44	(8)
2014–2017	1. FSV Mainz 05 II	35	(7)
2017	SC 1910 Käfertal	0	(0)
2017–2019	Waldhof Mannheim II	34	(12)
2019	Waldhof Mannheim	1	(0)
2019–2020	VfB Gartenstadt	12	(6)
2020–	FV Nußloch	6	(9)

Managerial career
- 2017: SC 1910 Käfertal (assistant)
- 2017–2019: Waldhof Mannheim II (assistant)
- * Club domestic league appearances and goals as of 2 February 2021

Dennis Franzin (born 12 July 1993) is a German footballer who plays as an attacking midfielder for FV Nußloch.
