= Steffen Puttkammer =

German footballer (born 1988)

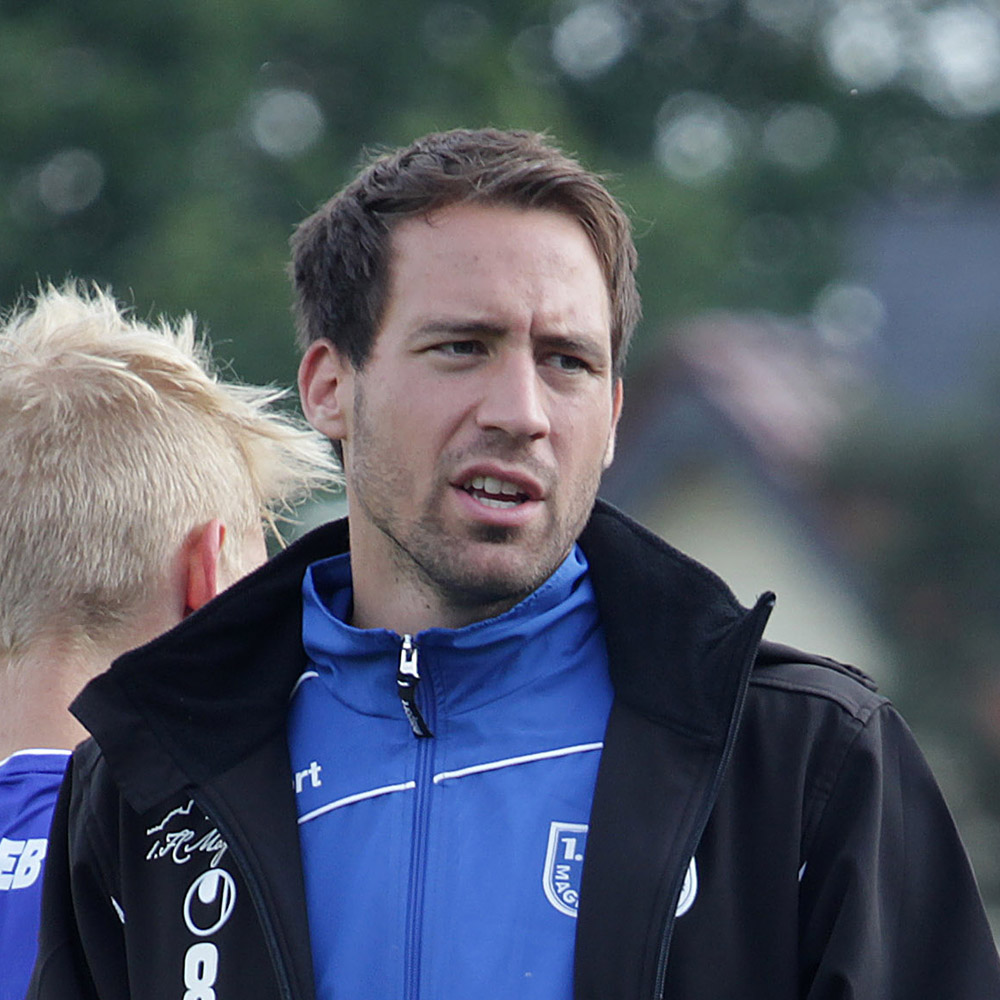
- Puttkammer with 1. FC Magdeburg

Personal information
- Date of birth: 30 September 1988 (age 38)
- Place of birth: Wilhelmshaven, West Germany
- Height: 1.92 m (6 ft 4 in)
- Position: Defender

Team information
- Current team: SV Meppen (assistant coach)

Youth career
- Heidmühler FC
- VfB Oldenburg

Senior career*
Years	Team	Apps	(Gls)
2007–2008	SV Wilhelmshaven	36	(1)
2008	BV Cloppenburg		
2008–2009	FC Oberneuland	23	(0)
2009–2013	SV Wilhelmshaven	95	(10)
2013–2017	1. FC Magdeburg	101	(10)
2017–2024	SV Meppen	139	(7)

Managerial career
- 2023–: SV Meppen (assistant)
- 2023: SV Meppen (caretaker)
- * Club domestic league appearances and goals

Steffen Puttkammer (born 30 September 1988) is a German professional football coach and a former defender who is an assistant manager for SV Meppen.

== Career ==
Puttkammer began playing football at Heidmühler SV before moving on to VfB Oldenburg. In 2007, he moved to Oberliga side SV Wilhelmshaven where he played 22 matches in his debut season. A year later he joined BV Cloppenburg, but was dropped only two weeks later and subsequently joined FC Oberneuland who played in the Regionalliga Nord. Here Puttkammer played his first Regionalliga matches, before returning to Wilhelmshaven in 2009, after the club had won promotion to the Regionalliga. In the summer of 2013, Puttkammer joined 1. FC Magdeburg where he established himself in the first team, and eventually won promotion to the 3. Liga in the 2014–15 Regionalliga season. Puttkammer's good performances saw his contract extended by two years until June 2017.

== Honours ==
SV Wilhelmshaven

- Lower Saxony Cup: 2006–07, 2009–10

1. FC Magdeburg

- Regionalliga Nordost: 2014–15
- Saxony-Anhalt Cup: 2013–14
