= Michael Schulze (footballer, born 1989) =

German footballer (born 1989)

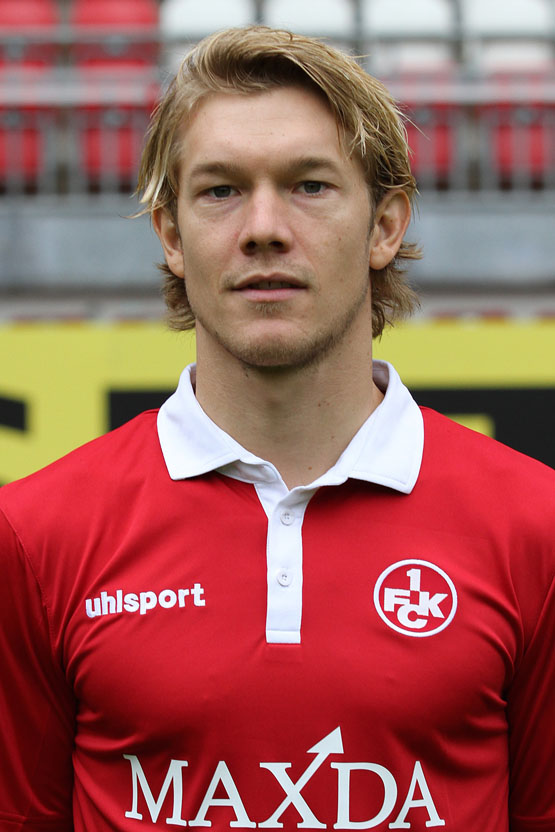
- Schulze with 1. FC Kaiserslautern in 2015

Personal information
- Date of birth: 13 January 1989 (age 37)
- Place of birth: Göttingen, West Germany
- Height: 1.85 m (6 ft 1 in)
- Position: Right-back

Youth career
- –2008: SSV Vorsfelde
- 2001–2008: VfL Wolfsburg

Senior career*
Years	Team	Apps	(Gls)
2008–2013	VfL Wolfsburg II	113	(7)
2011–2013	VfL Wolfsburg	2	(0)
2013	→ Energie Cottbus (loan)	14	(2)
2013–2014	Energie Cottbus	21	(0)
2014–2016	1. FC Kaiserslautern	36	(0)
2017	Eintracht Braunschweig II	7	(1)
2017	Eintracht Braunschweig	1	(0)
2017–2019	Sportfreunde Lotte	54	(0)
Total		248	(10)
- * Club domestic league appearances and goals

Michael Schulze (born 13 January 1989) is a German former professional footballer who played as a right-back.

== Career ==
Born in Göttingen, Schulze made his professional debut on 6 August 2011 for VfL Wolfsburg, in a Bundesliga match against 1. FC Köln.

In January 2017, Schulze joined the reserve side of Eintracht Braunschweig.
