= Shelby Printemps =

American-Haitian footballer (born 1990)

Personal information
- Date of birth: 10 August 1990 (age 36)
- Place of birth: Miami, United States
- Height: 1.80 m (5 ft 11 in)
- Position: Striker

Team information
- Current team: Türkgücü Friedberg
- Number: 17

Senior career*
| Years | Team | Apps | (Gls) |
| 2009 | Miami FC | 0 | (0) |
| 2009–2010 | Rocha | | |
| 2010–2011 | Għajnsielem | | |
| 2011–2013 | Vancouver Whitecaps FC U-23 | 0 | (0) |
| 2013–2016 | FSV Optik Rathenow | 52 | (14) |
| 2016 | Bhayangkara | | |
| 2016 | St Joseph's | 1 | (0) |
| 2016–2017 | Panelefsiniakos | 18 | (2) |
| 2017–2018 | Sandzak Frankfurt | 13 | (7) |
| 2018 | Sportfreunde Schwäbisch Hall | 7 | (1) |
| 2018–2019 | Optik Rathenow | 20 | (0) |
| 2019– | Türkgücü Friedberg | 30 | (13) |

International career^{‡}
| 2015 | Haiti | 1 | (1) |
- * Club domestic league appearances and goals as of 18:41, 23 February 2021 (UTC) ‡ National team caps and goals as of 14:55, 7 August 2018 (UTC)

Shelby Printemps (born 10 August 1990) is a professional footballer who plays for German club Türkgücü Friedberg, as a striker. Born in the United States, he represented Haiti at international level.

== Career ==
Born in Miami, United States, Printemps has played for Miami FC, Rocha, Għajnsielem, Vancouver Whitecaps FC U-23, FSV Optik Rathenow, Bhayangkara, St Joseph's, Panelefsiniakos, SV FC Sandzak Frankfurt, Sportfreunde Schwäbisch Hall and FSV Optik Rathenow.

He made his international debut for Haiti in 2015.
