= Michael Klauß (footballer, born 1987) =

German footballer

Personal information
- Full name: Michael Klauß
- Date of birth: 20 April 1987 (age 39)
- Place of birth: Sindelfingen, West Germany
- Height: 1.80 m (5 ft 11 in)
- Position: Left winger

Team information
- Current team: GSV Maichingen
- Number: 11

Youth career
- –2006: GSV Maichingen

Senior career*
Years	Team	Apps	(Gls)
2006–2010	VfB Stuttgart II	90	(9)
2010–2012	Jahn Regensburg	57	(10)
2012–2016	VfR Aalen	104	(6)
2016–2018	FC Köln II	52	(11)
2018–2020	Stuttgarter Kickers	68	(4)
2020–2022	SGV Freiberg	19	(0)
2022–	GSV Maichingen	77	(23)
- * Club domestic league appearances and goals as of 15:38, 19 January 2025 (UTC)

Michael Klauß (born 20 April 1987) is a German footballer who plays for GSV Maichingen.
