= Marco Kehl-Gómez =

Swiss-Spanish footballer (born 1992)

Personal information
- Date of birth: 1 May 1992 (age 34)
- Place of birth: Zürich, Switzerland
- Height: 1.81 m (5 ft 11 in)
- Position: Centre back

Team information
- Current team: SV Sandhausen
- Number: 33

Youth career
- Young Fellows Juventus
- –2010: Grasshoppers

Senior career*
Years	Team	Apps	(Gls)
2008–2013	Grasshoppers II	31	(1)
2011–2012	Grasshoppers	6	(0)
2012	→ Lugano (loan)	8	(0)
2013–2014	SC Pfullendorf	31	(2)
2014–2016	Chemnitzer FC	37	(1)
2015	Chemnitzer FC II	2	(0)
2016–2017	SV Elversberg	50	(3)
2017–2019	1. FC Saarbrücken	55	(4)
2019–2021	Rot-Weiss Essen	63	(10)
2021–2022	Türkgücü München	10	(0)
2022–2026	SGV Freiberg	136	(18)
2026–	SV Sandhausen	7	(0)
- * Club domestic league appearances and goals as of 24 September 2026

Marco Kehl-Gómez (born 1 May 1992) is a Swiss footballer who plays as a centre back for German club SV Sandhausen.
