= Daniel Brinkmann =

German footballer (born 1986)

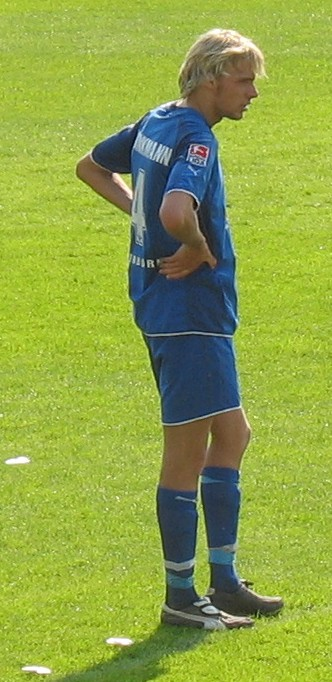
- Brinkmann with SC Paderborn in 2006

Personal information
- Date of birth: 29 January 1986 (age 40)
- Place of birth: Horn-Bad Meinberg, West Germany
- Height: 1.93 m (6 ft 4 in)
- Position: Midfielder

Youth career
- 1992–1995: TuS Horn-Bad Meinberg
- 1995–1997: TuS Eichholz-Remmighausen
- 1998: SV Diestelbruch-Mosebeck
- 1998–2000: SC Paderborn
- 2000–2002: BV Bad Lippspringe

Senior career*
Years	Team	Apps	(Gls)
2002–2007	SC Paderborn	56	(1)
2008–2009	Alemannia Aachen	32	(5)
2009–2012	FC Augsburg	66	(4)
2012–2014	Energie Cottbus	6	(1)
2014–2017	Arminia Bielefeld	27	(0)
2017–2020	SC Wiedenbrück	75	(11)
Total		262	(22)

International career
2007	Germany U20	1	(0)
2007	Germany U21	1	(0)

Managerial career
- 2020–2024: SC Wiedenbrück
- 2024: SC Paderborn II
- 2024–2026: Hansa Rostock
- * Club domestic league appearances and goals

Daniel Brinkmann (born 29 January 1986) is a German football coach and former player who last managed Hansa Rostock. He was a youth international for Germany.
