= Manuel Junglas =

German footballer

Personal information
- Date of birth: 31 January 1989 (age 37)
- Place of birth: Cologne, West Germany
- Height: 1.79 m (5 ft 10 in)
- Position: Midfielder

Youth career
- –2003: SC West Köln
- 2003–2004: SC Düsseldorf-West
- 2004–2009: Alemannia Aachen

Senior career*
Years	Team	Apps	(Gls)
2006–2009	Alemannia Aachen II	54	(18)
2009–2012	Alemannia Aachen	71	(3)
2012–2015	VfR Aalen	71	(5)
2015–2017	Arminia Bielefeld	62	(2)
2017–2018	Viktoria Köln	15	(1)
Total		273	(29)

International career
2006	Germany U17	2	(0)
- * Club domestic league appearances and goals

Manuel Junglas (born 31 January 1989) is a German former professional footballer who played as a midfielder.

== Club career ==
Born in Cologne, Junglas joined Alemannia Aachen in 2003 and was promoted to the second squad in 2006. Junglas made a single appearance as a substitute in the Bundesliga in the 2006–07 season for Alemannia Aachen against Arminia Bielefeld.

In 2009, Junglas received a contract for the professional team. Since then he appeared seventy times in the 2. Bundesliga and scored three goals.

== International career ==
Junglas was member of the Germany U-17 and played his first game on 21 February 2006 against Sweden U-17.
