= 2022–23 FC Ingolstadt 04 season =

FC Ingolstadt 04
2022–23 season
- Manager: Rüdiger Rehm (until 31 January); Guerino Capretti (from 1 February)
- Stadium: Audi Sportpark
- 3. Liga: 11th
- DFB-Pokal: First round
- Top goalscorer: League: Tobias Bech (13); All: Tobias Bech (13)
Home colours	Away colours	Third colours

The 2022–23 FC Ingolstadt 04 season was the club's first season return in the 3. Liga since their promotion in the 2020–21 season.

FC Ingolstadt were relegated from the 2021–22 2. Bundesliga, and returned to the 3. Liga after a one-year absence.

== Transfers ==
=== In ===
Pos	Player	Transferred from	Fee	Date	Source
MF	(Poland) David Kopacz	(Germany) Würzburger Kickers	Undisclosed	16 May 2022	
GK	(Germany) Marius Funk	(Germany) Greuther Fürth	Undisclosed	18 May 2022	
MF/DF	(Germany) / (United States) Marcel Costly	(Germany) SV Waldhof Mannheim	Free transfer	23 May 2022	
DF	(Germany) Calvin Brackelmann	(Germany) VfB Lübeck	Undisclosed	27 May 2022	
FW	(Germany) Pascal Testroet	(Germany) SV Sandhausen	Undisclosed	1 June 2022	
FW	(Guinea) Moussa Doumbouya	(Germany) Hannover 96	Undisclosed	3 June 2022	
MF	(Germany) Maximilian Dittgen	(Germany) FC St. Pauli	Free transfer	6 June 2022	
MF	(Germany) Tim Civeja	(Germany) FC Augsburg	Loan	23 June 2022	

=== Out ===
Pos	Player	Transferred to	Fee	Date	Source
DF	(Germany) Fabian Cavadias	(Germany) 1. FC Schweinfurt 05	Loan	10 June 2022	
FW	(Germany) Dennis Eckert	(Belgium) Royale Union Saint-Gilloise	Undisclosed	24 June 2022	
MF	(France) Yassin Ben Balla	(Germany) SV Darmstadt 98	Contract terminated	2 July 2022	
GK	(Croatia) Fabijan Buntić	(Portugal) FC Vizela	Undisclosed	2 July 2022	

== Competitions ==
=== Friendlies ===
18 June 2022	FC Ingolstadt	1–0	VfB Eichstätt	Großmehring
				Stadium: Sportanlage Großmehring

22 June 2022	FC Ingolstadt	3–1	FC Pipinsried	Ingolstadt
				Stadium: Audi Sportpark

30 June 2022	FC Lugano	0–1	FC Ingolstadt	Malles Venosta
				Stadium: Stadio Malles Venosta

6 July 2022	SpVgg Greuther Fürth	3–1	FC Ingolstadt	Roth
	Asta 5', 22'; Seufert 61'	Report	85' Musliu	Stadium: SPECK-Sportpark

9 July 2022	FC Ingolstadt	2–2	TSV Rain am Lech	Ingolstadt
				Stadium: Audi Sportpark

15 July 2022	FC Ingolstadt	2–2	Ulm	Ingolstadt
				Stadium: Audi Sportpark

8 January 2023	FC Ingolstadt	4–0	Chemnitzer FC	Ingolstadt
				Stadium: Audi Sportpark

=== 3. Liga ===
==== Table ====
Pos	Team	Pld	W	D	L	GF	GA	GD	Pts
9	Viktoria Köln	38	14	13	11	58	53	+5	55
10	SC Verl	38	13	10	15	60	58	+2	49
11	FC Ingolstadt	38	14	5	19	54	56	−2	47
12	MSV Duisburg	38	11	13	14	54	58	−4	46
13	Borussia Dortmund II (Note: Reserve teams are ineligible for promotion or DFB-Pokal qualification.)	38	13	6	19	47	49	−2	45

Source: DFB
Rules for classification: 1) Points; 2) Goal difference; 3) Goals scored; 4) Head-to-head results; 5) Head-to-head away goals scored; 6) Away goals scored; 7) Play-off.

==== Results ====
23 July 2022 1	FC Ingolstadt	1–0	SpVgg Bayreuth	Ingolstadt
13:00	Schmidt 5'; Costly (yellow card) 18'; Preißinger (red card) 89'; Linsmayer (yellow card) 90+3'		Weber (yellow card) 27'; Andermatt (yellow card) 56'	Stadium: Audi Sportpark; Attendance: 4,665; Referee: Patrick Kessel

7 August 2022 2	Borussia Dortmund II	0–4	FC Ingolstadt	Dortmund
12:00	Papadopoulos (yellow card) 34'		Schmidt 32' (yellow card) 68'; Testroet 45' (pen.); Costly (yellow card) 51'; Röhl 55'; Sarpei 65'	Stadium: Signal Iduna Park; Attendance: 2,018; Referee: Tom Bauer

10 August 2022 3	VfL Osnabrück	0–1	FC Ingolstadt	Osnabrück
18:00	Köhler (yellow card) 59'; Higl (yellow card) 59'; Haas (yellow card) 90+1'		Röhl 6' (yellow card) 54'; Musliu (yellow card) 26'; Costly (yellow card) 43'; Doumbouya (yellow card) 69'; Sarpei (yellow card) 84'; Butler (yellow card) 90+1'	Stadium: Stadion an der Bremer Brücke; Attendance: 11,953; Referee: Patrick Alt

13 August 2022 4	FC Ingolstadt	0–0	1. FC Saarbrücken	Ingolstadt
13:00	Schröck (yellow card) 36'; Röhl (yellow card) 55'; Franke (yellow card) 59'; Musliu (yellow card) 72'; Hawkins (yellow card) 90+1'		Grimaldi (yellow card) 72'; Çuni (yellow card) 84'	Stadium: Audi Sportpark; Attendance: 4,366; Referee: Nicolas Winter

20 August 2022 5	Rot-Weiss Essen	2–2	FC Ingolstadt	Essen
13:00	Bastians 9' (pen.); Engelmann 32'		Musliu (yellow card) 24'; Brackelmann (yellow card) 29'; Schmidt (yellow card) 44'; Bech 84', 88'	Stadium: Stadion an der Hafenstraße; Attendance: 3,507; Referee: Lars Erbst

27 August 2022 6	FC Ingolstadt	2–3	SV Wehen Wiesbaden	Ingolstadt
13:00	Bech 12', 37'		Froese (yellow card) 4'; Ezeh (yellow card) 26'; Gürleyen 39'; Hollerbach 66' (yellow card) 77'; Funk 73' (o.g.)	Stadium: Audi Sportpark; Attendance: 3,472; Referee: Florian Exner

3 September 2022 7	Freiburg II	1–0	FC Ingolstadt	Freiburg
13:00	Treu (yellow card) 20'; Kehl 55'		Schröck (yellow card) 21'; Sarpei (yellow card) 42'; Franke (yellow card) 74'	Stadium: Dreisamstadion; Attendance: 1,183; Referee: Lukas Benen

10 September 2022 8	FC Ingolstadt	1–0	SV Waldhof Mannheim	Ingolstadt
13:00	Musliu (yellow card) 42'; Bech 69' (yellow card) 83'; Schmidt (yellow card) 71'; Schröck (yellow card) 77'; Kopacz (yellow card) 88'		Höger (red card) 67'	Stadium: Audi Sportpark; Attendance: 4,201; Referee: Robin Braun

17 September 2022 9	Dynamo Dresden	1–1	FC Ingolstadt	Dresden
13:00	Kutschke 2'; Gogia (yellow card) 6'; Melichenko (yellow card) 39'		Testroet 26'; Antonitsch (yellow card) 69' (yellow-red card) 87'	Stadium: Rudolf-Harbig-Stadion; Attendance: 20,302; Referee: Florian Lechner

3 October 2022 10	FC Ingolstadt	0–0	FSV Zwickau	Ingolstadt
18:00	Kopacz (yellow card) 90'; Sarpei (yellow card) 90+1'		Kusić (yellow card) 90'; Löhmannsröben (yellow card) 90+2'	Stadium: Audi Sportpark; Attendance: 4,133; Referee: Nico Fuchs

8 October 2022 11	1860 Munich	1–2	FC Ingolstadt	Munich
13:00	Tallig (yellow card) 37'; Wein (yellow card) 80'; Skenderović 90+3'		Kopacz (yellow card) 9'; Costly 15'; Llugiqi (yellow card) 40'; Doumbouya (yellow card) 53'; Preißinger (yellow card) 64'; Bech (yellow card) 70'; Butler (yellow card) 73'; Schimdt 88'	Stadium: Grünwalder Stadion; Attendance: 15,000; Referee: Benjamin Brand

15 October 2022 12	FC Ingolstadt	3–1	SV Meppen	Ingolstadt
13:00	Schimdt 3'; Kraulich 26' (o.g.); Musliu (yellow card) 37'; Hawkins 90+3'		Pourié 30'; Abifade (yellow card) 49'; Hemlein (yellow card) 90'; Osée (yellow card) 90'	Stadium: Audi Sportpark; Attendance: 3,936; Referee: Mario Hildenbrand

23 October 2022 13	VfB Oldenburg	0–3	FC Ingolstadt	Oldenburg
12:00	Brand (yellow card) 6'; Appiah (yellow card) 57'; Plautz (yellow card) 84'		Costly 5'; Testroet 10'; Kopacz 23'; Linsmayer (yellow card) 59'	Stadium: Marschweg-Stadion; Attendance: 3,905; Referee: Christian Ballweg

30 October 2022 14	FC Ingolstadt	1–3	Viktoria Köln	Ingolstadt
13:00	Testroet 7' (pen.); Preißiger (yellow card) 37'		Becker 3' (yellow card) 43'; Dietz (yellow card) 6'; Handle 31'; Sontheimer (yellow card) 52'; Philipp 68'	Stadium: Audi Sportpark; Attendance: 5,458; Referee: Patrick Schwengers

5 November 2022 15	SC Verl	2–1	FC Ingolstadt	Verl
13:00	Mikic (yellow card) 19'; Ochojski 34'; Otto (yellow card) 75'; Stöcker 78'; Šapina (yellow card) 88'		Doumbouya 23'; Musliu (yellow card) 90+4'	Stadium: Home Deluxe Arena; Attendance: 705; Referee: Jonas Brombacher

8 November 2022 16	FC Ingolstadt	1–0	Hallescher FC	Ingolstadt
18:00	Bech 83'		Damer (yellow card) 44'	Stadium: Audi Sportpark; Attendance: 3,670; Referee: Konrad Oldhafer

12 November 2022 17	MSV Duisburg	0–1	FC Ingolstadt	Duisburg
13:00	Bitter (yellow card) 42'; König (yellow card) 84'		Preißinger (yellow card) 26'; Brackelmann 58'; Funk (yellow card) 80'	Stadium: MSV-Arena; Attendance: 10,161; Referee: Mitja Stegemann

16 January 2023 18	FC Ingolstadt	1–2	Erzgebirge Aue	Ingolstadt
18:00	Butler 8'; Brackelmann (yellow card) 35'; Sarpei (yellow card) 48'; Bech (yellow card) 74'; Neuberger (yellow card) 88'		Jonjić (yellow card) 35' (goal) 45+1'; Nazarov 67' (pen.); Majetschak (yellow card) 85'; Besong (yellow card) 90+6'	Stadium: Audi Sportpark; Attendance: 4,283; Referee: Robert Hartmann

21 January 2023 19	SV Elversberg	4–3	FC Ingolstadt	Spiesen-Elversberg
13:00	Schnellbacher 17'; Jacobsen 23', 25', 72' (pen.); Correia (yellow card) 38'; Pinckert (yellow card) 61' (yellow-red card) 65'		Brackelmann (yellow card) 17' (yellow-red card) 72'; Funk (yellow card) 9'; Butler 41'; Preißinger (yellow card) 47'; Dittgen 52'; Costly (yellow card) 76'; Testroet (yellow card) 90'; Doumbouya 90+5'	Stadium: Waldstadion an der Kaiserlinde; Attendance: 4,434; Referee: Nicolas Winter

28 January 2023 20	SpVgg Bayreuth	1–0	FC Ingolstadt	Bayreuth
13:00	Ziereis 17'; Lippert (yellow card) 21'; Zejnullahu (yellow card) 25' (yellow-red card) 83'; George (yellow card) 30'; Latteier (yellow card) 37'; Kolbe (yellow card) 38'		Kopacz (yellow card) 53'; Sarpei (yellow card) 53'; Schröck (yellow card) 74'; Linsmayer (yellow card) 82'	Stadium: Hans-Walter-Wild-Stadion; Attendance: 3,328; Referee: Sven Waschitski-Günther

4 February 2023 21	FC Ingolstadt	1–2	Borussia Dortmund II	Ingolstadt
13:00	Preißinger (yellow card) 45+1'; Brackelmann (yellow card) 47'; Testroet 53'		Papadopoulos (yellow card) 33'; Dams 40'; Njinmah 42'; Pudel (yellow card) 57'	Stadium: Audi Sportpark; Attendance: 3,767; Referee: Richard Hempel

12 February 2023 22	FC Ingolstadt	1–4	VfL Osnabrück	Ingolstadt
12:00	Brackelmann 19'; Kopacz (yellow card) 36'; Musliu (yellow card) 45+2'		Engelhardt 2', 45+3'; Köhler 27' (yellow card) 66'; Traoré 73'; Kleinhansl (yellow card) 75'	Stadium: Audi Sportpark; Attendance: 3,514; Referee: Max Burda

18 February 2023 23	1. FC Saarbrücken	3–4	FC Ingolstadt	Saarbrücken
13:00	Kerber 8'; Günther-Schimdt 9'; Grimaldi (yellow card) 44'; Rabihic 54' (yellow card) 61'; Neudecker (yellow card) 75'		Bech 1', 68', 80' (yellow card) 81'; Testroet 51'; Schröck (yellow card) 56'	Stadium: Ludwigsparkstadion; Attendance: 7,164; Referee: Daniel Schlager

25 February 2023 24	FC Ingolstadt	1–1	Rot-Weiss Essen	Ingolstadt
13:00	Kopacz (yellow card) 58'; Hawkins 90'		Alonso (yellow card) 37'; Rother (yellow card) 63'; Müsel (yellow card) 77'; Harenbrock 80'	Stadium: Audi Sportpark; Attendance: 4,841; Referee: Felix Bickel

4 March 2023 25	SV Wehen Wiesbaden	4–1	FC Ingolstadt	Wiesbaden
13:00	Hollerbach 13', 20', 47'; Ezeh (yellow card) 48'; Froese 84' (pen.); Iredale (yellow card) 90+1'		Testroet 24'; Linsmayer (yellow card) 43'; Butler (yellow card) 69'; Musliu (yellow card) 75'	Stadium: BRITA-Arena; Attendance: 3,526; Referee: Patrick Alt

12 March 2023 26	FC Ingolstadt	v	Freiburg II	Ingolstadt
12:00				Stadium: Audi Sportpark

=== Bavarian Cup ===
26 July 2022 First round	SpVgg Heßdorf	0–3	FC Ingolstadt	Heßdorf
17:30			Testroet 17'; Sulejmani 47'; Doumbouya 87'	Attendance: 999; Referee: Christopher Knauer

16 August 2022 Second round	FC Ingolstadt	3–0	Türkspor Augsburg	Ingolstadt
17:00	Hawkins 6' (pen.); Stevanović 37' (yellow card) 45'; Bech 40'		Brkic (yellow card) 5'; Nebihu (yellow card) 38'	Stadium: Audi Sportpark; Attendance: 653; Referee: Assad Nouhoum

6 September 2022 Third round	SV Schalding-Heining	0–3	FC Ingolstadt	Passau
16:30	Knochner (yellow card) 80' (yellow-red card) 85'		Schmidt 31' (pen.); Kopacz 48'; Brackelmann (yellow card) 53'; Costly 69' (pen.)	Stadium: Städtische Sportanlage; Attendance: 620; Referee: Thomas Ehrnsperger

27 September 2022 Quarter-finals	VfB Eichstätt	1–1 (a.e.t.) (5–6 p)	FC Ingolstadt	Eichstätt
15:30	Federl (yellow card) 40' (goal) 75'; Trslic (yellow card) 87'		Testroet 19'; Sarpei (yellow card) 34'; Stevanović (yellow card) 77' (yellow-red card) 86'; Civeja (yellow card) 80'	Stadium: Liqui-Moly-Stadion; Attendance: 420; Referee: Christopher Knauer

28 March 2023 Semi-finals	ATSV Erlangen	0-2	FC Ingolstadt	Erlangen
18:00			Civeja 65'; Doumbouya 79'	Stadium: ATSV-Sportanlage Paul-Gossen-Straße

3 June 2023 Final	Illertissen	-	FC Ingolstadt	Illertissen
16:45				Stadium: Voehlin-Stadium

=== DFB-Pokal ===
1 August 2022 First round	FC Ingolstadt	0–3	Darmstadt 98	Ingolstadt
18:01	Ponath (yellow card) 3'; Röhl (yellow card) 43'; Schmidt (yellow card) 63'	Report	Tietz 15'; Kempe 42' (pen.); Warming 84'	Stadium: Audi Sportpark; Attendance: 5,298; Referee: Robert Hartmann
