= List of German football transfers winter 2021–22 =

This is a list of German football transfers in the winter transfer window 2021–22 by club. Only transfers of the Bundesliga, and 2. Bundesliga are included.

== Bundesliga ==
Note: Flags indicate national team as has been defined under FIFA eligibility rules. Players may hold more than one non-FIFA nationality.

=== FC Bayern Munich ===
In:

| No. | Pos. | Nation | Player |

Out:

| No. | Pos. | Nation | Player |
|---|---|---|---|
| 17 | MF | FRA | Michaël Cuisance (to Venezia) |
| 43 | DF | GER | Bright Arrey-Mbi (on loan to 1. FC Köln) |
| — | MF | GER | Adrian Fein (on loan to Dynamo Dresden, previously on loan at Greuther Fürth) |

=== RB Leipzig ===
In:

| No. | Pos. | Nation | Player |

Out:

| No. | Pos. | Nation | Player |
|---|---|---|---|
| 21 | FW | NED | Brian Brobbey (on loan to Ajax) |
| 26 | MF | GUI | Ilaix Moriba (on loan to Valencia) |
| 43 | DF | URU | Marcelo Saracchi (free agent) |
| 47 | MF | GER | Joscha Wosz (on loan to Hallescher FC) |
| — | FW | GER | Fabrice Hartmann (on loan to Eintracht Braunschweig, previously on loan at SC Paderborn) |
| — | DF | BRA | Luan Cândido (to Red Bull Bragantino, previously on loan) |

=== Borussia Dortmund ===
In:

| No. | Pos. | Nation | Player |

Out:

| No. | Pos. | Nation | Player |
|---|---|---|---|
| 36 | MF | GER | Ansgar Knauff (on loan to Eintracht Frankfurt) |
| 37 | MF | GER | Tobias Raschl (to Greuther Fürth) |

=== VfL Wolfsburg ===
In:

| No. | Pos. | Nation | Player |
|---|---|---|---|
| 9 | FW | GER | Max Kruse (from Union Berlin) |
| 23 | FW | DEN | Jonas Wind (from Copenhagen) |
| 40 | MF | USA | Kevin Paredes (from D.C. United) |

Out:

| No. | Pos. | Nation | Player |
|---|---|---|---|
| 9 | FW | NED | Wout Weghorst (to Burnley) |
| 14 | FW | SUI | Admir Mehmedi (to Antalyaspor) |
| 23 | MF | FRA | Josuha Guilavogui (on loan to Bordeaux) |
| 33 | FW | GER | Daniel Ginczek (to Fortuna Düsseldorf) |
| 38 | DF | GER | Jannis Lang (to Erzgebirge Aue) |
| 44 | MF | GER | Marvin Stefaniak (to Würzburger Kickers) |
| — | MF | USA | Bryang Kayo (on loan to 1. FC Nürnberg II, previously on loan at Viktoria Berlin) |

=== Eintracht Frankfurt ===
In:

| No. | Pos. | Nation | Player |
|---|---|---|---|
| 36 | MF | GER | Ansgar Knauff (on loan from Borussia Dortmund) |

Out:

| No. | Pos. | Nation | Player |
|---|---|---|---|
| 28 | FW | ESP | Fabio Blanco (to Barcelona B) |
| 32 | MF | GER | Amin Younes (loan return to Napoli) |
| 45 | MF | SLO | Martin Pečar (on loan to Austria Wien) |

=== Bayer 04 Leverkusen ===
In:

| No. | Pos. | Nation | Player |
|---|---|---|---|
| 9 | FW | IRI | Sardar Azmoun (from Zenit Saint Petersburg) |

Out:

| No. | Pos. | Nation | Player |
|---|---|---|---|
| 3 | DF | GRE | Panagiotis Retsos (to Hellas Verona) |
| 11 | MF | GER | Nadiem Amiri (on loan to Genoa) |
| 37 | FW | GER | Emrehan Gedikli (to Trabzonspor) |

=== 1. FC Union Berlin ===
In:

| No. | Pos. | Nation | Player |
|---|---|---|---|
| 10 | FW | GER | Sven Michel (from SC Paderborn) |
| 13 | MF | HUN | András Schäfer (from Dunajská Streda) |
| 33 | DF | GER | Dominique Heintz (from SC Freiburg) |

Out:

| No. | Pos. | Nation | Player |
|---|---|---|---|
| 4 | DF | NED | Rick van Drongelen (on loan to Mechelen) |
| 5 | DF | GER | Marvin Friedrich (to Borussia Mönchengladbach) |
| 10 | FW | GER | Max Kruse (to VfL Wolfsburg) |
| 15 | MF | POL | Paweł Wszołek (on loan to Legia Warsaw) |
| 26 | DF | POL | Tymoteusz Puchacz (on loan to Trabzonspor) |
| 35 | MF | GER | Fabio Schneider (on loan to KuPS) |
| 36 | FW | GER | Cedric Teuchert (to Hannover 96) |

=== Borussia Mönchengladbach ===
In:

| No. | Pos. | Nation | Player |
|---|---|---|---|
| 5 | DF | GER | Marvin Friedrich (from Union Berlin) |

Out:

| No. | Pos. | Nation | Player |
|---|---|---|---|
| 8 | MF | SUI | Denis Zakaria (to Juventus) |
| 11 | MF | AUT | Hannes Wolf (on loan to Swansea City) |
| 26 | MF | GER | Torben Müsel (on loan to Eupen) |

=== VfB Stuttgart ===
In:

| No. | Pos. | Nation | Player |
|---|---|---|---|
| 18 | FW | POR | Tiago Tomás (on loan from Sporting CP) |

Out:

| No. | Pos. | Nation | Player |
|---|---|---|---|
| 4 | DF | GER | Marc-Oliver Kempf (to Hertha BSC) |
| 18 | FW | GER | Hamadi Al Ghaddioui (to Pafos FC) |
| 21 | MF | GER | Philipp Klement (on loan to SC Paderborn) |
| 27 | FW | AUS | Alou Kuol (on loan to SV Sandhausen) |
| 29 | FW | GUI | Momo Cissé (on loan to Wisła Kraków) |

=== SC Freiburg ===
In:

| No. | Pos. | Nation | Player |
|---|---|---|---|
| 2 | DF | BEL | Hugo Siquet (from Standard Liège) |

Out:

| No. | Pos. | Nation | Player |
|---|---|---|---|
| 23 | DF | GER | Dominique Heintz (to Union Berlin) |

=== 1899 Hoffenheim ===
In:

| No. | Pos. | Nation | Player |
|---|---|---|---|
| 24 | DF | USA | Justin Che (on loan from FC Dallas) |

Out:

| No. | Pos. | Nation | Player |
|---|---|---|---|
| 2 | DF | NED | Joshua Brenet (to Twente) |
| 20 | MF | SRB | Mijat Gaćinović (on loan to Panathinaikos) |
| 23 | FW | ARM | Sargis Adamyan (on loan to Club Brugge) |
| 32 | DF | NED | Melayro Bogarde (on loan to Groningen) |
| — | DF | BRA | Lucas Ribeiro (on loan to Ceará, previously on loan at Internacional) |
| — | FW | BRA | Klauss (on loan to Sint-Truiden, previously on loan at Standard Liège) |
| — | DF | NED | Justin Hoogma (to Heracles Almelo, previously on loan at Greuther Fürth) |
| — | MF | BRA | Bruno Nazário (to Vasco da Gama, previously on loan at América Mineiro) |

=== Mainz 05 ===
In:

| No. | Pos. | Nation | Player |
|---|---|---|---|
| 37 | FW | NED | Delano Burgzorg (on loan from Heracles Almelo) |

Out:

| No. | Pos. | Nation | Player |
|---|---|---|---|
| 41 | GK | GER | Marius Liesegang (to Dynamo Dresden) |
| — | FW | FRA | Jean-Philippe Mateta (to Crystal Palace, previously on loan) |

=== FC Augsburg ===
In:

| No. | Pos. | Nation | Player |
|---|---|---|---|
| 18 | FW | USA | Ricardo Pepi (from FC Dallas) |

Out:

| No. | Pos. | Nation | Player |
|---|---|---|---|
| 9 | FW | VEN | Sergio Córdova (on loan to Real Salt Lake) |

=== Hertha BSC ===
In:

| No. | Pos. | Nation | Player |
|---|---|---|---|
| 3 | DF | NOR | Fredrik André Bjørkan (from Bodø/Glimt) |
| 20 | DF | GER | Marc-Oliver Kempf (from VfB Stuttgart) |
| 28 | FW | FRA | Kélian Nsona (from Caen) |
| 30 | FW | KOR | Lee Dong-jun (from Ulsan Hyundai) |

Out:

| No. | Pos. | Nation | Player |
|---|---|---|---|
| 9 | FW | POL | Krzysztof Piątek (on loan to Fiorentina) |
| 25 | DF | GER | Jordan Torunarigha (on loan to Gent) |
| 30 | FW | POL | Dennis Jastrzembski (to Śląsk Wrocław) |
| 42 | DF | NED | Deyovaisio Zeefuik (on loan to Blackburn Rovers) |

=== Arminia Bielefeld ===
In:

| No. | Pos. | Nation | Player |
|---|---|---|---|
| 7 | MF | GER | Gonzalo Castro (free agent) |
| 17 | MF | TUR | Burak Ince (from Altınordu) |
| 24 | DF | USA | George Bello (from Atlanta United) |

Out:

| No. | Pos. | Nation | Player |
|---|---|---|---|
| 6 | DF | GER | Lennart Czyborra (loan return to Genoa) |
| — | GK | SWE | Oscar Linnér (on loan to Sundsvall, previously on loan at Brescia) |

=== 1. FC Köln ===
In:

| No. | Pos. | Nation | Player |
|---|---|---|---|
| 5 | DF | GER | Bright Arrey-Mbi (on loan from Bayern Munich) |
| 24 | DF | GER | Jeff Chabot (on loan from Sampdoria) |

Out:

| No. | Pos. | Nation | Player |
|---|---|---|---|
| 3 | DF | GER | Noah Katterbach (on loan to Basel) |
| 5 | DF | GER | Rafael Czichos (to Chicago Fire) |
| 22 | DF | ESP | Jorge Meré (to Club América) |
| 26 | DF | SRB | Sava-Arangel Čestić (to Rijeka) |
| 38 | MF | GER | Jens Castrop (on loan to 1. FC Nürnberg) |
| — | DF | GER | Robert Voloder (to Maribor, previously on loan) |

=== VfL Bochum ===
In:

| No. | Pos. | Nation | Player |
|---|---|---|---|
| 19 | FW | NED | Jürgen Locadia (from Brighton & Hove Albion) |

Out:

| No. | Pos. | Nation | Player |
|---|---|---|---|
| 13 | MF | GHA | Raman Chibsah (to Apollon Smyrnis) |
| 15 | FW | HUN | Soma Novothny (to Anorthosis Famagusta) |
| 35 | FW | CGO | Silvère Ganvoula (on loan to Cercle Brugge) |

=== SpVgg Greuther Fürth ===
In:

| No. | Pos. | Nation | Player |
|---|---|---|---|
| 9 | FW | ANG | Afimico Pululu (from Basel) |
| 20 | MF | GER | Tobias Raschl (from Borussia Dortmund) |
| 26 | GK | SWE | Andreas Linde (from Molde) |

Out:

| No. | Pos. | Nation | Player |
|---|---|---|---|
| 5 | DF | NED | Justin Hoogma (loan return to 1899 Hoffenheim) |
| 6 | MF | GER | Adrian Fein (loan return to Bayern Munich) |
| 8 | MF | GER | Nils Seufert (on loan to SV Sandhausen) |
| 14 | MF | GHA | Hans Nunoo Sarpei (to FC Ingolstadt) |
| 19 | FW | SUI | Cedric Itten (loan return to Rangers) |

== 2. Bundesliga ==
=== Werder Bremen ===
In:

| No. | Pos. | Nation | Player |

Out:

| No. | Pos. | Nation | Player |
|---|---|---|---|
| — | FW | GER | Justin Njinmah (on loan to Borussia Dortmund II) |
| — | MF | GER | Benjamin Goller (on loan to Karlsruher SC, previously on loan at Darmstadt 98) |

=== FC Schalke 04 ===
In:

| No. | Pos. | Nation | Player |
|---|---|---|---|
| 5 | DF | NOR | Marius Lode (from Bodø/Glimt) |
| 14 | MF | KOR | Lee Dong-gyeong (on loan from Ulsan Hyundai) |
| 16 | DF | NOR | Andreas Vindheim (on loan from Sparta Prague) |

Out:

| No. | Pos. | Nation | Player |
|---|---|---|---|
| 15 | DF | BEL | Dries Wouters (on loan to Mechelen) |
| 31 | DF | GER | Timo Becker (on loan to Hansa Rostock) |

=== Holstein Kiel ===
In:

| No. | Pos. | Nation | Player |
|---|---|---|---|
| 18 | FW | GHA | Kwasi Okyere Wriedt (from Willem II) |

Out:

| No. | Pos. | Nation | Player |
|---|---|---|---|
| 9 | FW | ISL | Hólmbert Friðjónsson (on loan to Lillestrøm) |

=== Hamburger SV ===
In:

| No. | Pos. | Nation | Player |
|---|---|---|---|
| 7 | MF | GEO | Giorgi Chakvetadze (on loan from Gent) |

Out:

| No. | Pos. | Nation | Player |
|---|---|---|---|
| 8 | MF | ENG | Tommy Doyle (loan return to Manchester City) |
| 22 | FW | GER | Robin Meißner (on loan to Hansa Rostock) |

=== Fortuna Düsseldorf ===
In:

| No. | Pos. | Nation | Player |
|---|---|---|---|
| 10 | FW | GER | Daniel Ginczek (from VfL Wolfsburg) |
| 30 | DF | NED | Jordy de Wijs (on loan from Queens Park Rangers) |
| 34 | DF | FRA | Nicolas Gavory (from Standard Liège) |

Out:

| No. | Pos. | Nation | Player |
|---|---|---|---|
| 9 | FW | POL | Dawid Kownacki (on loan to Lech Poznań) |
| 16 | DF | ROU | Dragoș Nedelcu (loan return to FCSB) |
| 27 | FW | GER | Nicklas Shipnoski (on loan to Jahn Regensburg) |
| 43 | DF | GER | Jamil Siebert (on loan to Viktoria Köln) |

=== Karlsruher SC ===
In:

| No. | Pos. | Nation | Player |
|---|---|---|---|
| 5 | DF | FIN | Daniel O'Shaughnessy (from HJK) |
| 14 | MF | GER | Benjamin Goller (on loan from Werder Bremen, previously on loan at Darmstadt 98) |

Out:

| No. | Pos. | Nation | Player |
|---|---|---|---|
| 19 | FW | GER | Dominik Kother (on loan to Waldhof Mannheim) |

=== SV Darmstadt 98 ===
In:

| No. | Pos. | Nation | Player |
|---|---|---|---|
| 36 | FW | GER | André Leipold (from Wacker Burghausen) |

Out:

| No. | Pos. | Nation | Player |
|---|---|---|---|
| 7 | MF | GER | Benjamin Goller (loan return to Werder Bremen) |
| 40 | FW | GER | Erich Berko (to SV Sandhausen) |

=== 1. FC Heidenheim ===
In:

| No. | Pos. | Nation | Player |

Out:

| No. | Pos. | Nation | Player |
|---|---|---|---|
| 17 | MF | GER | Florian Pick (on loan to FC Ingolstadt) |

=== SC Paderborn ===
In:

| No. | Pos. | Nation | Player |
|---|---|---|---|
| 19 | FW | SUI | Kemal Ademi (on loan from Khimki) |
| 30 | MF | KOS | Florent Muslija (from Hannover 96) |
| 31 | MF | GER | Philipp Klement (on loan from VfB Stuttgart) |

Out:

| No. | Pos. | Nation | Player |
|---|---|---|---|
| 7 | FW | GER | Prince Osei Owusu (to Erzgebirge Aue) |
| 11 | FW | GER | Sven Michel (to Union Berlin) |
| 35 | FW | GER | Fabrice Hartmann (loan return to RB Leipzig) |

=== FC St. Pauli ===
In:

| No. | Pos. | Nation | Player |

Out:

| No. | Pos. | Nation | Player |
|---|---|---|---|
| 5 | MF | GER | Marvin Knoll (to MSV Duisburg) |
| 36 | MF | DOM | Luis Coordes (to VfB Stuttgart II) |

=== 1. FC Nürnberg ===
In:

| No. | Pos. | Nation | Player |
|---|---|---|---|
| 17 | MF | GER | Jens Castrop (on loan from 1. FC Köln) |

Out:

| No. | Pos. | Nation | Player |
|---|---|---|---|
| 28 | DF | GER | Linus Rosenlöcher (on loan to Esbjerg fB) |

=== Erzgebirge Aue ===
In:

| No. | Pos. | Nation | Player |
|---|---|---|---|
| 4 | DF | GER | Jannis Lang (from VfL Wolfsburg) |
| 14 | FW | GER | Jann George (from Jahn Regensburg) |
| 29 | FW | GER | Prince Osei Owusu (from SC Paderborn) |

Out:

| No. | Pos. | Nation | Player |
|---|---|---|---|
| 22 | FW | SEN | Babacar Guèye (free agent) |
| 37 | FW | CRO | Antonio Mance (loan return to Osijek) |

=== Hannover 96 ===
In:

| No. | Pos. | Nation | Player |
|---|---|---|---|
| 15 | FW | GER | Cedric Teuchert (from Union Berlin) |
| 35 | MF | NED | Mark Diemers (on loan from Feyenoord) |

Out:

| No. | Pos. | Nation | Player |
|---|---|---|---|
| 6 | MF | GER | Tom Trybull (to SV Sandhausen) |
| 7 | FW | GHA | Patrick Twumasi (to Maccabi Netanya) |
| 18 | FW | CMR | Franck Evina (on loan to Viktoria Berlin) |
| 19 | FW | KOS | Valmir Sulejmani (to FC Ingolstadt) |
| 35 | MF | KOS | Florent Muslija (to SC Paderborn) |

=== Jahn Regensburg ===
In:

| No. | Pos. | Nation | Player |
|---|---|---|---|
| 9 | FW | GER | Nicklas Shipnoski (on loan from Fortuna Düsseldorf) |

Out:

| No. | Pos. | Nation | Player |
|---|---|---|---|
| 9 | FW | GER | Jann George (to Erzgebirge Aue) |
| 29 | FW | GER | André Becker (on loan to Würzburger Kickers) |

=== SV Sandhausen ===
In:

| No. | Pos. | Nation | Player |
|---|---|---|---|
| 3 | DF | BIH | Dario Đumić (from Twente) |
| 11 | FW | GER | Erich Berko (from Darmstadt 98) |
| 16 | GK | GER | Felix Wiedwald (free agent) |
| 21 | MF | GER | Nils Seufert (on loan from Greuther Fürth) |
| 23 | FW | TUR | Ahmed Kutucu (on loan from İstanbul Başakşehir) |
| 24 | FW | LUX | Maurice Deville (from Saarbrücken) |
| 28 | MF | GER | Tom Trybull (from Hannover 96) |
| 29 | FW | AUS | Alou Kuol (on loan from VfB Stuttgart) |

Out:

| No. | Pos. | Nation | Player |
|---|---|---|---|
| 5 | MF | GER | Carlo Sickinger (on loan to SV Elversberg) |
| 11 | MF | GER | Gianluca Gaudino (on loan to SCR Altach) |
| 20 | MF | MAR | Anas Ouahim (to Heracles Almelo) |
| 23 | MF | GER | Christian Conteh (loan return to Feyenoord) |
| 35 | FW | CUW | Charlison Benschop (to Fortuna Sittard) |

=== Dynamo Dresden ===
In:

| No. | Pos. | Nation | Player |
|---|---|---|---|
| 14 | MF | GER | Adrian Fein (on loan from Bayern Munich, previously on loan at Greuther Fürth) |
| 27 | FW | CZE | Václav Drchal (on loan from Sparta Prague) |
| 31 | GK | GER | Marius Liesegang (from Mainz 05) |
| 37 | MF | GER | Oliver Batista Meier (from Bayern Munich II) |

Out:

| No. | Pos. | Nation | Player |
|---|---|---|---|
| 9 | FW | GER | Pascal Sohm (to Waldhof Mannheim) |
| 14 | FW | AUT | Philipp Hosiner (to Kickers Offenbach) |
| 20 | MF | KOR | Seo Jong-min (on loan to Wacker Innsbruck) |
| 36 | MF | GER | Max Kulke (on loan to ZFC Meuselwitz) |

=== Hansa Rostock ===
In:

| No. | Pos. | Nation | Player |
|---|---|---|---|
| 2 | DF | GER | Timo Becker (on loan from Schalke 04) |
| 15 | FW | SWE | Nils Fröling (from Kalmar FF) |
| 19 | FW | GER | Robin Meißner (on loan from Hamburger SV) |
| 26 | FW | UKR | Danylo Sikan (on loan from Shakhtar Donetsk) |

Out:

| No. | Pos. | Nation | Player |

=== FC Ingolstadt 04 ===
In:

| No. | Pos. | Nation | Player |
|---|---|---|---|
| 15 | DF | SRB | Nikola Stevanović (from Radnički Niš) |
| 16 | DF | MKD | Visar Musliu (from Fehérvár) |
| 18 | MF | GHA | Hans Nunoo Sarpei (from Greuther Fürth) |
| 26 | MF | GER | Florian Pick (on loan from 1. FC Heidenheim) |
| 33 | FW | KOS | Valmir Sulejmani (from Hannover 96) |
| 39 | GK | MKD | Dejan Stojanović (on loan from Middlesbrough) |

Out:

| No. | Pos. | Nation | Player |
|---|---|---|---|
| 8 | MF | MAR | Nassim Boujellab (loan return to Schalke 04) |
| 16 | DF | GER | Peter Kurzweg (to Würzburger Kickers) |
| 20 | FW | USA | Jalen Hawkins (on loan to Saarbrücken) |
| 26 | DF | GER | Jan-Hendrik Marx (to Eintracht Braunschweig) |
| 31 | FW | GER | Justin Butler (on loan to Waldhof Mannheim) |
| 39 | GK | GER | Lucas Schellenberg (to Rot-Weiß Erfurt) |

== See also ==
- 2021–22 Bundesliga
- 2021–22 2. Bundesliga
