= 2018–19 1. FC Magdeburg season =

1. FC Magdeburg
2018–19 season
- Chairman: Peter Fechner
- Manager: Jens Härtel
- Stadium: MDCC-Arena
- 2. Bundesliga: 17th (relegated)
- DFB-Pokal: First round
Home colours	Away colours

The 2018–19 1. FC Magdeburg season was the 53rd season in the history of 1. FC Magdeburg. The season covers a period from 1 July 2018 to 30 June 2019. It was the first season the club played in 2. Bundesliga, and the second season in a second-tier league after they had competed in the DDR-Liga in the 1966–67 season.

== Players ==
=== Squad information ===
As of 31 August 2018

Note: Flags indicate national team as defined under FIFA eligibility rules; some limited exceptions apply. Players may hold more than one non-FIFA nationality.

No.	Pos.	Nation	Player
1	GK	BIH	Jasmin Fejzic
3	DF	GER	Christopher Handke
5	DF	GER	Tobias Müller
6	MF	GER	Björn Rother
7	FW	GER	Felix Lohkemper
8	MF	GER	Philip Türpitz
9	DF	GER	Marcel Costly
10	DF	GER	Nico Hammann
11	FW	GER	Christian Beck
12	GK	GER	Mario Seidel
13	MF	GER	Dennis Erdmann
14	DF	GER	Steffen Schäfer
16	DF	GER	Nils Butzen (captain)

No.	Pos.	Nation	Player
17	MF	GER	Richard Weil
18	DF	SRB	Aleksandar Ignjovski
19	MF	GER	Michel Niemeyer
20	DF	GER	Joel Abu Hanna
21	MF	GER	Rico Preißinger
22	DF	GER	Manfred Osei Kwadwo
23	MF	FRA	Charles-Elie Laprévotte
24	MF	TUN	Tarek Chahed
25	FW	GER	Philipp Harant
26	FW	GER	Marius Bülter
30	GK	GER	Alexander Brunst
33	DF	FRA	Romain Brégerie
37	FW	KOS	Mërgim Berisha (on loan from Red Bull Salzburg)

== Friendly matches ==
Win Draw Loss

30 June 2018	Brandenburger SC Süd 05	0–6	1. FC Magdeburg	Rathenow
13:30		Summary	Beck 22' (pen.), 27', 74', 90'; Bülter 34'; Erdmann 78'	Stadium: Stadion am Vogelgesang; Attendance: 646

30 June 2018	FSV Optik Rathenow	0–0	1. FC Magdeburg	Rathenow
16:00		Summary		Stadium: Stadion am Vogelgesang; Attendance: 646

6 July 2018	Eintracht Norderstedt	1–2	1. FC Magdeburg	Bernburg
12:00	Veselinovic 75'	Summary	Beck 3'; Türpitz 72'	Stadium: Sparkassenarena

6 July 2018	Askania Bernburg	0–6	1. FC Magdeburg	Bernburg
14:00		Summary	Preißinger 5'; Lohkemper 14', 57'; Harant 21', 29'; Bülter 33'	Stadium: Sparkassenarena

11 July 2018	VfB Lübeck	2–2	1. FC Magdeburg	Langlingen
16:00	Grupe 32'; Sezer 80'	Summary	Weil 15'; Beck 56'	Attendance: 350

14 July 2018	1. FC Magdeburg	3–1	FC Energie Cottbus	Barleben
14:00	Müller 12'; Türpitz 13'; Preißinger 36'	Summary	Mamba 45'	Stadium: Stadion am Anger; Attendance: 1512

18 July 2018	Germania Halberstadt	0–5	1. FC Magdeburg	Halberstadt
18:00		Summary	Berisha 23', 26', 38'; Bülter 78', 89'	Stadium: Friedensstadion; Attendance: 1503

21 July 2018	1. FC Magdeburg	0–0 (4–2 p)	Swansea City	Magdeburg
15:15		Summary		Stadium: MDCC-Arena; Attendance: 5870

21 July 2018	1. FC Magdeburg	2–0	Genoa C.F.C.	Magdeburg
16:30	Lohkemper 23'; Butzen 53'	Summary		Stadium: MDCC-Arena; Attendance: 5870

25 July 2018	SSV Markranstädt	0–9	1. FC Magdeburg	Markranstädt
18:30		Summary	Lohkemper 29', 35', 60'; Laprevotte 31'; Weil 45'; Bülter 58', 74'; Berisha 78'; Costly 89'	Stadium: Stadion am Bad; Attendance: 350

27 July 2018	SC Paderborn	3–0	1. FC Magdeburg	Paderborn
12:00	Klement 4'; Tietz 13'; Zolinski 89'	Summary		Stadium: Benteler Arena

28 August 2018	1. FC Magdeburg	3–1	Rot-Weiß Erfurt	Magdeburg
17:00		Report		Stadium: MDCC-Arena; Attendance: 807

11 October 2018	VfL Wolfsburg	1–1	1. FC Magdeburg	Wolfsburg
14:00		Report		Stadium: AOK Stadion

16 November 2018	Eintracht Braunschweig	1–1	1. FC Magdeburg	Braunschweig
16:00		Report		Stadium: Eintracht-Stadion; Attendance: 704

7 January 2019	Borussia Mönchengladbach	1–2	1. FC Magdeburg	Jerez de la Frontera
14:00		Report		Stadium: Calle Nueva Via Montecastillo

9 January 2019	1. FC Magdeburg	2–0	Shenzhen	Chiclana de la Frontera
15:00		Report

11 January 2019	Karlsruher SC	0–3	1. FC Magdeburg	La Línea de la Concepción
11:00		Report		Stadium: Estadio Municipal de La Línea de la Concepción

19 January 2019	Energie Cottbus	1–0	1. FC Magdeburg	Cottbus
13:00		Report		Stadium: Stadion der Freundschaft

22 January 2019	1. FC Magdeburg	3–2	FSV Zwickau	Magdeburg
14:30		Report		Stadium: MDCC-Arena

== Competitions ==
=== 2. Bundesliga ===
==== League table ====
Pos	Team	Pld	W	D	L	GF	GA	GD	Pts	Promotion, qualification or relegation
14	Erzgebirge Aue	34	11	7	16	43	47	−4	40	
15	SV Sandhausen	34	9	11	14	45	52	−7	38	
16	FC Ingolstadt (R)	34	9	8	17	43	55	−12	35	Qualification for relegation play-offs
17	1. FC Magdeburg (R)	34	6	13	15	35	53	−18	31	Relegation to 3. Liga
18	MSV Duisburg (R)	34	6	10	18	39	65	−26	28	Relegation to 3. Liga

Source: DFB
Rules for classification: 1) Points; 2) Goal difference; 3) Goals scored; 4) Head-to-head points; 5) Head-to-head goal difference; 6) Head-to-head goals scored; 7) Head-to-head away goals scored; 8) Away goals scored; 9) Play-off.
(R) Relegated

==== Results by round ====
Matchday	1	2	3	4	5	6	7	8	9	10	11	12	13	14	15	16	17	18	19	20	21	22	23	24	25	26	27	28	29	30	31	32	33	34
Ground	H	A	H	A	H	A	H	A	H	A	H	A	H	A	H	H	A	A	H	A	H	A	H	A	H	A	H	A	H	A	H	A	A	H
Result	L	D	D	L	D	D	D	W	D	L	L	L	L	L	D	D	L	L	W	W	D	W	D	L	L	D	D	W	L	L	W	L	L	D
Position	12	15	15	15	16	16	15	14	15	15	15	15	17	17	16	16	17	17	15	15	15	15	15	15	15	16	16	16	16	16	16	17	17	17

Updated to match(es) played on 23 September 2018. Source: kicker.de
A = Away; H = Home; W = Win; D = Draw; L = Loss

==== Matches ====
2. Bundesliga match details
Match	Date	Time	Opponent	Venue	Result F–A	Scorers	Attendance	Ref.
1	5 August 2018	13:30	FC St. Pauli	Home	1–2	Beck 16'	24,156	
2	12 August 2018	15:30	Erzgebirge Aue	Away	0–0		13,300	
3	25 August 2018	13:00	Ingolstadt 04	Home	1–1	Erdmann 29'	18,913	
4	3 September 2018	20:30	Holstein Kiel	Away	1–2	Türpitz 65'	9,314	
5	17 September 2018	20:30	Arminia Bielefeld	Home	0–0		19,794	
6	23 September 2018	13:30	SC Paderborn	Away	4–4	Costly 26', Beck 63', Lohkemper 82', Türpitz 90+1' pen.	11,525	
7	26 September 2018	18:30	MSV Duisburg	Home	3–3	Beck 62', Türpitz 64', Handke 84'	18,696	
8	30 September 2018	13:30	SV Sandhausen	Away	1–0	Beck 73'	7,352	
9	6 October 2018	13:00	Dynamo Dresden	Home	2–2	Kreuzer 60' o.g., Bülter 90+1'	23,024	
10	20 October 2018	13:00	1. FC Heidenheim	Away	0–3		10,450	
11	26 October 2018	18:30	Hamburger SV	Home	0–1		23,132	
12	3 November 2018	13:00	Darmstadt 98	Away	1–3	Bülter 71'	15,410	
13	11 November 2018	13:30	Jahn Regensburg	Home	2–3	Beck 4', 67'	20,336	
14	23 November 2018	18:30	Greuther Fürth	Away	2–3	Beck 40', Lohkemper 49'	9,390	
15	2 December 2018	13:30	VfL Bochum	Home	0–0		22,252	
16	9 December 2018	13:30	Union Berlin	Home	1–1	Beck 39'	23,149	
17	17 December 2018	20:30	1. FC Köln	Away	0–3		49,500	
18	22 December 2018	13:00	FC St. Pauli	Away	1–4	Niemeyer 35'	29,546	
19	29 January 2019	20:30	Erzgebirge Aue	Home	1–0	Lohkemper 44'	18,757	
20	1 February 2019	18:30	Ingolstadt 04	Away	1–0	Türpitz 81'	8,216	
21	10 February 2019	13:30	Holstein Kiel	Home	1–1	Türpitz 42'	19,704	
22	17 February 2019	13:30	Arminia Bielefeld	Away	3–1	Perthel 33', Lohkemper 45', Türpitz 85' pen.	19,568	
23	24 February 2019	13:30	SC Paderborn	Home	1–1	Preißinger 13'	20,201	
24	1 March 2019	18:30	MSV Duisburg	Away	0–1		13,416	
25	10 March 2019	13:30	SV Sandhausen	Home	0–1		19,615	
26	16 March 2019	13:00	Dynamo Dresden	Away	1–1	Rother 43'	30,500	
27	29 March 2019	18:30	1. FC Heidenheim	Home	0–0		17,517	
28	8 April 2019	20:30	Hamburger SV	Away	2–1	Bülter 60', Türpitz 90+4'	49,823	
29	13 April 2019	13:00	Darmstadt 98	Home	0–1		17,413	
30	21 April 2019	13:30	Jahn Regensburg	Away	0–1		10,543	
31	27 April 2019	13:00	Greuther Fürth	Home	2–1	Beck 16', Lohkemper 45+1'	18,243	
32	4 May 2019	13:00	VfL Bochum	Away	2–4	Bülter 64', Beck 87'	17,339	
33	12 May 2019	15:30	Union Berlin	Away	0–3		22,012	
34	19 May 2019	15:30	1. FC Köln	Home	1–1	Lohkemper 53'	18,902	

=== DFB-Pokal ===
DFB-Pokal match details
Round	Date	Time	Opponent	Venue	Result F–A	Scorers	Attendance	Ref.
First round	17 August 2018	20:45	Darmstadt 98	Home	0–1		20,165	
