= List of German football transfers winter 2020–21 =

This is a list of German football transfers in the winter transfer window 2020–21 by club. Only transfers of the Bundesliga, and 2. Bundesliga are included.

== Bundesliga ==
Note: Flags indicate national team as has been defined under FIFA eligibility rules. Players may hold more than one non-FIFA nationality.

=== FC Bayern Munich ===
In:

No.	Pos.	Nation	Player

Out:

No.	Pos.	Nation	Player
14	FW	NED	Joshua Zirkzee (on loan to Parma)
41	DF	USA	Chris Richards (on loan to 1899 Hoffenheim)
45	FW	GER	Leon Dajaku (on loan to 1. FC Union Berlin)

=== Borussia Dortmund ===
In:

No.	Pos.	Nation	Player

Out:

No.	Pos.	Nation	Player

=== RB Leipzig ===
In:

No.	Pos.	Nation	Player
17	MF	HUN	Dominik Szoboszlai (from Red Bull Salzburg)

Out:

No.	Pos.	Nation	Player
32	GK	GER	Tim Schreiber (on loan to Hallescher FC)
41	FW	GER	Dennis Borkowski (on loan to 1. FC Nürnberg)
45	DF	GER	Eric Martel (on loan to Austria Wien)

=== Bayer 04 Leverkusen ===
In:

No.	Pos.	Nation	Player
24	DF	NED	Timothy Fosu-Mensah (from Manchester United)
28	MF	ENG	Demarai Gray (from Leicester City)
30	DF	NED	Jeremie Frimpong (from Celtic)

Out:

No.	Pos.	Nation	Player

=== Borussia Mönchengladbach ===
In:

No.	Pos.	Nation	Player
29	DF	USA	Joe Scally (from New York City)
—	MF	FRA	Kouadio Koné (from Toulouse)

Out:

No.	Pos.	Nation	Player
22	MF	SVK	László Bénes (on loan to FC Augsburg)
40	DF	DEN	Andreas Poulsen (on loan to Austria Wien)
—	MF	FRA	Kouadio Koné (on loan to Toulouse)

=== VfL Wolfsburg ===
In:

No.	Pos.	Nation	Player

Out:

No.	Pos.	Nation	Player
2	DF	BRA	William (on loan to Schalke 04)
10	MF	TUR	Yunus Mallı (to Trabzonspor)
11	MF	GER	Felix Klaus (on loan to Fortuna Düsseldorf)
29	FW	EGY	Omar Marmoush (on loan to FC St. Pauli)

=== Eintracht Frankfurt ===
In:

No.	Pos.	Nation	Player
9	FW	SRB	Luka Jović (on loan from Real Madrid)

Out:

No.	Pos.	Nation	Player
9	FW	NED	Bas Dost (to Club Brugge)
19	DF	ARG	David Abraham (to Huracán de Chabás)
24	DF	GER	Danny da Costa (on loan to Mainz 05)
28	MF	GER	Dominik Kohr (on loan to Mainz 05)
42	MF	BIH	Marijan Ćavar (to Greuther Fürth)

=== Werder Bremen ===
In:

No.	Pos.	Nation	Player

Out:

No.	Pos.	Nation	Player
22	MF	NED	Tahith Chong (loan return to Manchester United)
27	GK	GRE	Stefanos Kapino (on loan to SV Sandhausen)

=== 1899 Hoffenheim ===
In:

No.	Pos.	Nation	Player
28	DF	USA	Chris Richards (on loan from Bayern Munich)
33	FW	FRA	Georginio Rutter (from Rennes)

Out:

No.	Pos.	Nation	Player
7	MF	DEN	Jacob Bruun Larsen (on loan to Anderlecht)
33	FW	BRA	Klauss (on loan to Standard Liège)
—	FW	GER	David Otto (on loan to Jahn Regensburg, previously on loan at 1. FC Heidenheim)

=== Hertha BSC ===
In:

No.	Pos.	Nation	Player
24	FW	SRB	Nemanja Radonjić (on loan from Marseille)
28	MF	GER	Sami Khedira (from Juventus)

Out:

No.	Pos.	Nation	Player
24	FW	GER	Palkó Dárdai (to Fehérvár)
—	MF	GER	Dennis Jastrzembski (on loan to Waldhof Mannheim, previously on loan at Paderborn 07)

=== 1. FSV Mainz 05 ===
In:

No.	Pos.	Nation	Player
22	DF	GER	Danny da Costa (on loan from Eintracht Frankfurt)
31	MF	GER	Dominik Kohr (on loan from Eintracht Frankfurt)
-	FW	GER	Robert Glatzel (on loan from Cardiff City)

Out:

No.	Pos.	Nation	Player
3	DF	ESP	Aarón Martín (on loan to Celta Vigo)
9	FW	FRA	Jean-Philippe Mateta (on loan to Crystal Palace)
11	FW	KOR	Ji Dong-won (on loan to Eintracht Braunschweig)
13	DF	BEL	Dimitri Lavalée (on loan to Sint-Truiden)
22	FW	GHA	Abass Issah (on loan to Twente)

=== SC Freiburg ===
In:

No.	Pos.	Nation	Player

Out:

No.	Pos.	Nation	Player
6	MF	ALB	Amir Abrashi (on loan to Basel)
24	DF	GER	Gian-Luca Itter (on loan to Greuther Fürth)

=== FC Schalke 04 ===
In:

No.	Pos.	Nation	Player
13	DF	BRA	William (on loan from VfL Wolfsburg)
20	DF	BIH	Sead Kolašinac (on loan from Arsenal)
21	FW	NED	Klaas-Jan Huntelaar (from Ajax)
30	DF	GER	Shkodran Mustafi (from Arsenal)

Out:

No.	Pos.	Nation	Player
4	DF	TUR	Ozan Kabak (on loan to Liverpool)
11	FW	BIH	Vedad Ibišević (released)
14	FW	WAL	Rabbi Matondo (on loan to Stoke City)
15	FW	TUR	Ahmed Kutucu (on loan to Heracles Almelo)

=== FC Augsburg ===
In:

No.	Pos.	Nation	Player
18	MF	SVK	László Bénes (on loan from Borussia Mönchengladbach)

Out:

No.	Pos.	Nation	Player
4	DF	GER	Felix Götze (on loan to 1. FC Kaiserslautern)

=== 1. FC Köln ===
In:

No.	Pos.	Nation	Player
13	MF	GER	Max Meyer (from Crystal Palace)
42	FW	NGA	Emmanuel Dennis (on loan from Club Brugge)

Out:

No.	Pos.	Nation	Player
17	MF	GER	Christian Clemens (to Darmstadt 98)
27	FW	FRA	Antony Modeste (on loan to Saint-Étienne)
30	DF	DEN	Frederik Sørensen (released)

=== 1. FC Union Berlin ===
In:

No.	Pos.	Nation	Player
8	FW	GER	Leon Dajaku (on loan from Bayern Munich)
24	FW	CRO	Petar Musa (on loan from Slavia Prague)

Out:

No.	Pos.	Nation	Player
35	GK	GER	Lennart Moser (on loan from Austria Klagenfurt)

=== Arminia Bielefeld ===
In:

No.	Pos.	Nation	Player
-	MF	JPN	Masaya Okugawa (on loan from Red Bull Salzburg)
-	MF	NED	Michel Vlap (on loan from Anderlecht)

Out:

No.	Pos.	Nation	Player
3	DF	GER	Brian Behrendt (to Eintracht Braunschweig)
13	FW	GER	Sebastian Müller (on loan to VfL Osnabrück)
22	FW	GER	Noel Niemann (on loan to Türkgücü München)

=== VfB Stuttgart ===
In:

No.	Pos.	Nation	Player

Out:

No.	Pos.	Nation	Player
17	DF	GER	Maxime Awoudja (on loan to Türkgücü München)
29	DF	BRA	Ailton (to Midtjylland)

== 2. Bundesliga ==
=== Fortuna Düsseldorf ===
In:

No.	Pos.	Nation	Player
27	MF	GER	Felix Klaus (on loan from VfL Wolfsburg)

Out:

No.	Pos.	Nation	Player
39	DF	GER	Jean Zimmer (on loan to 1. FC Kaiserslautern)

=== SC Paderborn 07 ===
In:

No.	Pos.	Nation	Player
5	MF	COD	Chadrac Akolo (on loan from Amiens)
14	DF	SUI	Nicolas Bürgy (on loan from Young Boys)

Out:

No.	Pos.	Nation	Player
5	DF	GER	Christian Strohdiek (to Würzburger Kickers)
12	DF	GER	Jesse Tugbenyo (on loan to Sportfreunde Lotte)
14	MF	GER	Adrian Oeynhausen (on loan to Rot Weiss Ahlen)
26	MF	ENG	Antony Evans (on loan to Crewe Alexandra)
30	FW	GER	Streli Mamba (to Kairat)
32	MF	GER	Dennis Jastrzembski (loan return to Hertha BSC)

=== Hannover 96 ===
In:

No.	Pos.	Nation	Player

Out:

No.	Pos.	Nation	Player

=== 1. FC Nürnberg ===
In:

No.	Pos.	Nation	Player
19	FW	GER	Dennis Borkowski (on loan from RB Leipzig)
24	MF	NOR	Mats Møller Dæhli (on loan from Genk)

Out:

No.	Pos.	Nation	Player
8	MF	NZL	Sarpreet Singh (loan return to Bayern Munich)
24	FW	NED	Virgil Misidjan (to PEC Zwolle)
-	DF	CRO	Jakov Medić (to Wehen Wiesbaden, previously on loan)
-	MF	GER	Simon Rhein (to Hansa Rostock)

=== Hamburger SV ===
In:

No.	Pos.	Nation	Player

Out:

No.	Pos.	Nation	Player
16	FW	AUT	Lukas Hinterseer (to Ulsan Hyundai)
17	MF	ENG	Xavier Amaechi (on loan to Karlsruher SC)

=== 1. FC Heidenheim ===
In:

No.	Pos.	Nation	Player
-	FW	GER	Tim Kleindienst (on loan from Gent)

Out:

No.	Pos.	Nation	Player
10	FW	GER	David Otto (loan return to 1899 Hoffenheim)
23	MF	GER	Merveille Biankadi (on loan to 1860 Munich)
32	FW	GER	Patrick Schmidt (on loan to SV Sandhausen)

=== Holstein Kiel ===
In:

No.	Pos.	Nation	Player
2	DF	DEN	Mikkel Kirkeskov (from Piast Gliwice)

Out:

No.	Pos.	Nation	Player
10	MF	GHA	David Atanga (on loan to Admira Wacker)
17	FW	GER	Makana Baku (on loan to Warta Poznań)
18	MF	GER	Lion Lauberbach (on loan to Hansa Rostock)

=== Jahn Regensburg ===
In:

No.	Pos.	Nation	Player
14	FW	GER	David Otto (on loan from 1899 Hoffenheim, previously on loan at 1. FC Heidenheim)

Out:

No.	Pos.	Nation	Player
20	FW	GER	Federico Palacios Martínez (on loan to MSV Duisburg)

=== FC St. Pauli ===
In:

No.	Pos.	Nation	Player
18	MF	SWE	Eric Smith (on loan from Gent)
21	GK	AUT	Dejan Stojanović (on loan from Middlesbrough)
22	FW	EGY	Omar Marmoush (on loan from VfL Wolfsburg)
24	DF	NOR	Tore Reginiussen (from Rosenborg)
25	DF	POL	Adam Dźwigała (from Aves)

Out:

No.	Pos.	Nation	Player
7	MF	USA	Kevin Lankford (on loan to Wehen Wiesbaden)
24	FW	UKR	Borys Tashchy (released)
28	DF	GER	Marvin Senger (on loan at 1. FC Kaiserslautern)
30	GK	GER	Robin Himmelmann (released)

=== SV Darmstadt 98 ===
In:

No.	Pos.	Nation	Player
3	DF	SWE	Thomas Isherwood (from Östersund)
20	MF	GER	Christian Clemens (from 1. FC Köln)
28	MF	SUI	Samuele Campo (on loan from Basel)

Out:

No.	Pos.	Nation	Player
33	FW	GER	Braydon Manu (on loan to Hallescher FC)

=== VfL Bochum ===
In:

No.	Pos.	Nation	Player

Out:

No.	Pos.	Nation	Player
7	MF	GER	Sebastian Maier (to Türkgücü München)
26	MF	GER	Lars Holtkamp (on loan to Wuppertaler SV)
33	DF	GER	Moritz Römling (on loan to Wuppertaler SV)
38	DF	GRE	Stylianos Kokovas (to Karviná)

=== Eintracht Braunschweig ===
In:

No.	Pos.	Nation	Player
25	DF	SEN	Oumar Diakhité (free agent)
30	DF	GER	Brian Behrendt (from Arminia Bielefeld)
-	FW	KOR	Ji Dong-won (on loan from Mainz 05)

Out:

No.	Pos.	Nation	Player
1	GK	GER	Marcel Engelhardt (to Maritzburg United)
11	FW	GER	Leandro Putaro (to SC Verl)
32	DF	GER	Michael Schultz (on loan to Viktoria Köln)

=== SpVgg Greuther Fürth ===
In:

No.	Pos.	Nation	Player
8	MF	BIH	Marijan Ćavar (from Eintracht Frankfurt)
27	DF	GER	Gian-Luca Itter (on loan from SC Freiburg)

Out:

No.	Pos.	Nation	Player

=== Erzgebirge Aue ===
In:

No.	Pos.	Nation	Player

Out:

No.	Pos.	Nation	Player

=== SV Sandhausen ===
In:

No.	Pos.	Nation	Player
1	GK	GRE	Stefanos Kapino (on loan from Werder Bremen)
5	MF	GER	Janik Bachmann (from 1. FC Kaiserslautern)
32	FW	GER	Patrick Schmidt (on loan from 1. FC Heidenheim)
-	MF	GRE	Nikolaos Zografakis (from VfB Stuttgart II)

Out:

No.	Pos.	Nation	Player
1	GK	AUT	Martin Fraisl (released)
5	MF	GER	Marlon Frey (to MSV Duisburg)
7	MF	GER	Philip Türpitz (to Hansa Rostock)
11	FW	MAR	Aziz Bouhaddouz (to MSV Duisburg)
37	MF	MAR	Anas Ouahim (on loan to 1. FC Kaiserslautern)

=== VfL Osnabrürck ===
In:

No.	Pos.	Nation	Player
-	FW	NED	Jay-Roy Grot (from Leeds United)
-	FW	GER	Sebastian Müller (on loan from Arminia Bielefeld)

Out:

No.	Pos.	Nation	Player
11	MF	GER	Nico Granatowski (to 1. FC Magdeburg)
25	MF	GER	Sven Köhler (on loan to SC Verl)

=== Karlsruher SC ===
In:

No.	Pos.	Nation	Player
-	DF	AUT	Kevin Wimmer (on loan from Stoke City)
-	MF	ENG	Xavier Amaechi (on loan from Hamburger SV)

Out:

No.	Pos.	Nation	Player

=== Würzburger Kickers ===
In:

No.	Pos.	Nation	Player
10	FW	GER	Marvin Pieringer (on loan from SC Freiburg II)
24	FW	AUT	Stefan Maierhofer (from Admira Wacker)
31	DF	VEN	Rolf Feltscher (from LA Galaxy)
32	DF	GER	Christian Strohdiek (from Paderborn 07)
35	MF	CZE	Martin Hašek (from Sparta Prague)
-	MF	NED	Rajiv van La Parra (from Logroñés)

Out:

No.	Pos.	Nation	Player
5	DF	GER	Leroy Kwadwo (to Dynamo Dresden)
11	FW	GER	Saliou Sané (on loan to 1. FC Magdeburg)
23	MF	AUT	Florian Flecker (to TSV Hartberg)

== See also ==
- 2020–21 Bundesliga
- 2020–21 2. Bundesliga
