= Marcel Costly =

German footballer (born 1995)

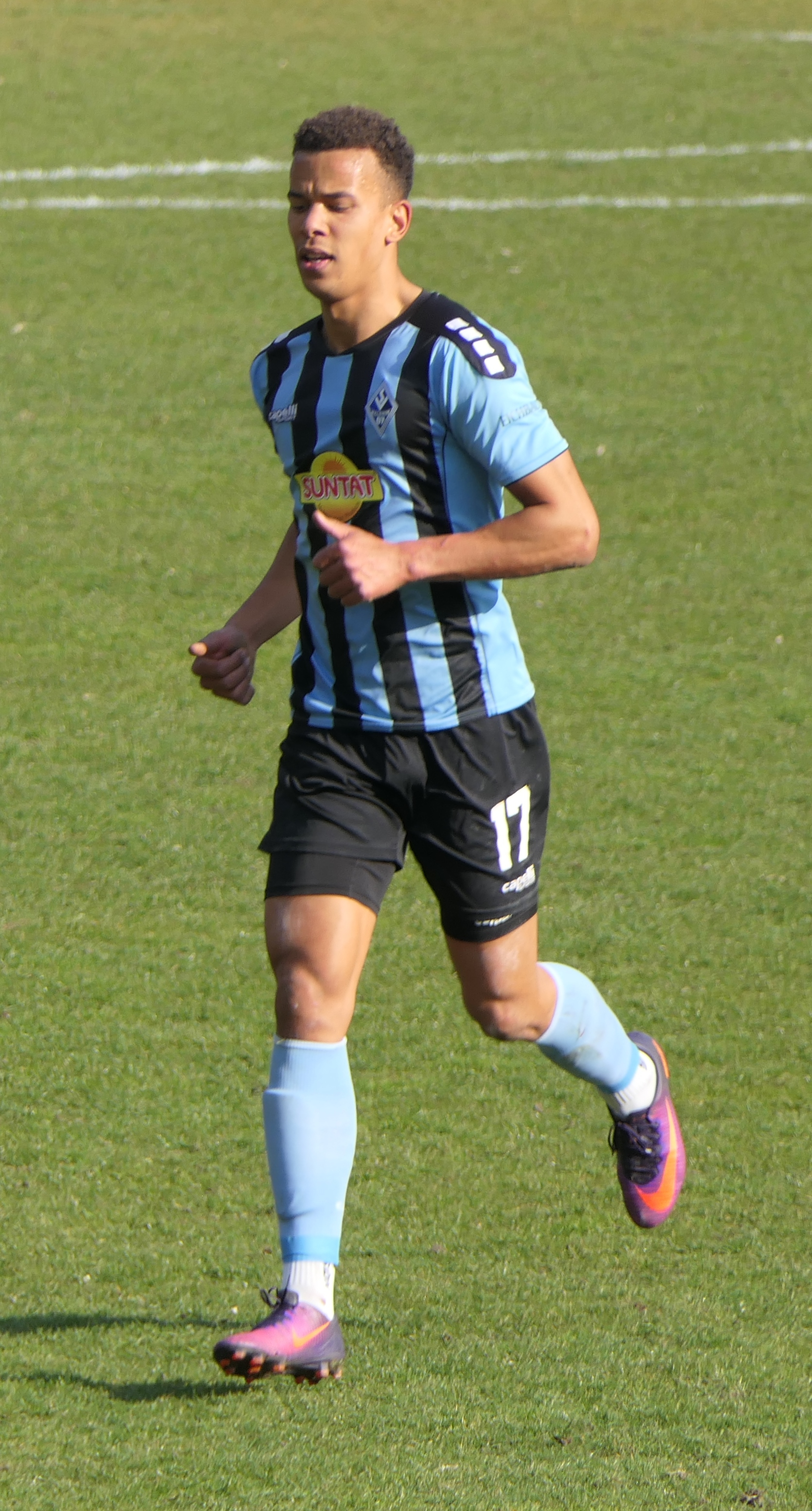

Personal information
- Date of birth: 20 November 1995 (age 30)
- Place of birth: Achim, Germany
- Height: 1.83 m (6 ft 0 in)
- Positions: Right midfielder; right-back

Team information
- Current team: 1. FC Heidenheim
- Number: 24

Youth career
- –2013: FC Verden 04

Senior career*
Years	Team	Apps	(Gls)
2013–2014	Rotenburger SV	24	(8)
2014–2018	Mainz 05 II	80	(5)
2018–2020	1. FC Magdeburg	63	(5)
2020–2022	Waldhof Mannheim	73	(8)
2022–2026	FC Ingolstadt	128	(23)
2026–	1. FC Heidenheim	5	(1)
- * Club domestic league appearances and goals as of 13 September 2026

Marcel Costly (born 20 November 1995) is a German professional footballer who plays as a right midfielder or right-back for 2. Bundesliga club 1. FC Heidenheim.

== Club career ==
Costly played his 250th match in the 3rd division on 30 March 2025.

On 1 June 2026, Costly signed a three-season contract with 1. FC Heidenheim.

== Career statistics ==
As of match played 13 September 2026

Appearances and goals by club, season and competition
Club	Season	League			Cup		Other		Total	
Club	Season	Division	Apps	Goals	Apps	Goals	Apps	Goals	Apps	Goals
Rotenburger SV	2013–14	Oberliga Niedersachsen	24	8	—		—		24	8
Mainz 05 II	2014–15	3. Liga	7	0	—		—		7	0
Mainz 05 II	2015–16	3. Liga	22	2	—		—		22	2
Mainz 05 II	2016–17	3. Liga	30	1	—		—		30	1
Mainz 05 II	2017–18	Regionalliga Südwest	21	2	—		—		21	2
Mainz 05 II	Total		80	5	—		—		80	5
1. FC Magdeburg	2017–18	3. Liga	13	2	—		1 (Note: Appearances in Saxony-Anhalt Cup)	0	14	2
1. FC Magdeburg	2018–19	2. Bundesliga	28	1	1	0	—		29	1
1. FC Magdeburg	2019–20	3. Liga	22	2	1	0	3	3	26	5
1. FC Magdeburg	Total		63	5	2	0	4	3	69	8
Waldhof Mannheim	2020–21	3. Liga	37	5	1	0	3 (Note: Appearances in Baden Cup)	0	41	5
Waldhof Mannheim	2021–22	3. Liga	36	3	2	0	1	0	39	3
Waldhof Mannheim	Total		73	8	3	0	4	0	81	8
FC Ingolstadt	2022–23	3. Liga	33	2	1	0	4 (Note: Appearannces in Bavarian Cup)	0	38	2
FC Ingolstadt	2023–24	3. Liga	28	2	0	0	4	0	32	2
FC Ingolstadt	2024–25	3. Liga	29	1	1	0	4	0	34	1
FC Ingolstadt	2025–26	3. Liga	38	18	0	0	5	0	43	18
FC Ingolstadt	Total		128	23	2	0	17	0	147	23
1. FC Heidenheim	2026–27	2. Bundesliga	5	1	1	0	—		6	1
Career total			373	50	8	0	25	3	406	53
