= Calvin Brackelmann =

German footballer (born 1999)

Personal information
- Full name: Calvin Marc Brackelmann
- Date of birth: 22 August 1999 (age 27)
- Place of birth: Lüneburg, Germany
- Height: 1.96 m (6 ft 5 in)
- Position: Centre-back

Team information
- Current team: FC Augsburg
- Number: 2

Youth career
- 2003–2005: MTV Handorf
- 2005–2006: MTV Treubund Lüneburg
- 2006–2013: Hamburger SV
- 2013: MTV Treubund Lüneburg
- 2013–2017: Hansa Rostock
- 2017–2018: 1. FC Köln

Senior career*
Years	Team	Apps	(Gls)
2018–2020	1. FC Köln II	11	(0)
2020	Schalke 04 II	4	(0)
2021	SV Rödinghausen	2	(0)
2021–2022	VfB Lübeck	29	(2)
2022–2023	FC Ingolstadt	28	(2)
2023–2026	SC Paderborn	59	(5)
2023–2024	SC Paderborn II	13	(1)
2026–	FC Augsburg	7	(1)

International career
2016–2017	Germany U18	6	(0)
2017–2018	Germany U19	3	(0)
- * Club domestic league appearances and goals as of 24 October 2026

Calvin Brackelmann (born 22 August 1999) is a German professional footballer who plays as a centre-back for Bundesliga club FC Augsburg.

== Career ==
Brackelmann started his career with 1. FC Köln II.

In 2021, he signed for VfB Lübeck. In 2022, he signed for FC Ingolstadt.

On 31 August 2023, Brackelmann joined SC Paderborn in 2. Bundesliga.

On 29 May 2026, Brackelmann signed a four-year contract with FC Augsburg.

== Style of play ==
Mainly a centre-back, Brackelmann was also deployed as a left-back during his time at Ingolstadt.

== Career statistics ==
As of match played 24 October 2026

Appearances and goals by club, season and competition
Club	Season	League			Cup		Europe		Other		Total	
Club	Season	Division	Apps	Goals	Apps	Goals	Apps	Goals	Apps	Goals	Apps	Goals
1. FC Köln II	2018–19	Regionalliga West	6	0	—		—		—		6	0
1. FC Köln II	2019–20	Regionalliga West	5	0	—		—		—		5	0
1. FC Köln II	Total		11	0	—		—		—		11	0
Schalke 04 II	2019–20	Regionalliga West	4	0	—		—		—		4	0
SV Rödinghausen	2020–21	Regionalliga West	2	0	—		—		0	0	2	0
VfB Lübeck	2021–22	Regionalliga Nord	29	2	—		—		4 (Note: Appearances in Schleswig-Holstein Cup)	1	33	3
FC Ingolstadt	2022–23	3. Liga	28	2	1	0	—		4 (Note: Appearances in Bavarian Cup)	0	33	2
Paderborn 07	2023–24	2. Bundesliga	13	0	0	0	—		—		13	0
Paderborn 07	2024–25	2. Bundesliga	22	3	1	0	—		—		23	3
Paderborn 07	2025–26	2. Bundesliga	24	2	1	0	—		2 (Note: Appearances in promotion play-offs)	0	27	2
Paderborn 07	Total		59	5	2	0	—		2	0	63	5
Paderborn 07 II	2023–24	Regionalliga West	12	1	—		—		—		12	1
Paderborn 07 II	2024–25	Regionalliga West	1	0	—		—		—		1	0
Paderborn 07 II	Total		13	1	—		—		—		13	1
Augsburg	2026–27	Bundesliga	7	1	0	0	—		—		7	1
Career total			153	11	3	0	0	0	10	1	166	12
