= Marius Bülter =

German footballer (born 1993)

Personal information
- Date of birth: 29 March 1993 (age 33)
- Place of birth: Ibbenbüren, Germany
- Height: 1.90 m (6 ft 3 in)
- Positions: Left winger; forward

Team information
- Current team: 1. FC Köln
- Number: 30

Youth career
- 1999–2009: Brukteria Dreierwalde
- 2009–2011: Preußen Münster
- 2011–2012: Eintracht Rheine

Senior career*
| Years | Team | Apps | (Gls) |
| 2012–2013 | Eintracht Rheine | | |
| 2013–2014 | SuS Neuenkirchen | 32 | (13) |
| 2014–2018 | SV Rödinghausen | 114 | (39) |
| 2018–2020 | 1. FC Magdeburg | 32 | (4) |
| 2019–2020 | → Union Berlin (loan) | 32 | (7) |
| 2020–2021 | Union Berlin | 26 | (1) |
| 2021–2023 | Schalke 04 | 65 | (21) |
| 2023–2025 | TSG Hoffenheim | 55 | (8) |
| 2025– | 1. FC Köln | 39 | (5) |
- * Club domestic league appearances and goals as of 17:30, 1 November 2026 (UTC)

Marius Bülter (born 29 March 1993) is a German professional footballer who plays as a left winger or forward for Bundesliga club 1. FC Köln.

== Career ==
=== Early career and Magdeburg ===
Born in Ibbenbüren, Bülter played for Eintracht Rheine, SuS Neuenkirchen and SV Rödinghausen before signing for 1. FC Magdeburg in the summer of 2018. Over the 2018–19 season, Bülter made 32 appearances, scoring four goals, in a season where Magdeburg would get relegated to the 3. Liga.

=== Union Berlin ===
On 4 July 2019, Bülter joined Bundesliga club 1. FC Union Berlin on a season-long loan, with the club having the option to make the transfer permanent at the end of the season. He made his debut for Union in their first Bundesliga appearance: a 4–0 defeat at home to RB Leipzig. His first goals for Union came in a stunning 3–1 victory at home to Borussia Dortmund: The opening and winning goals in Union's first win in the Bundesliga.

=== Schalke 04 ===
On 26 June 2021, he agreed to join Schalke 04, newly relegated from the Bundesliga, signing a three-year contract.

=== TSG Hoffenheim ===
On 6 July 2023, following Schalke 04 relegation from Bundesliga, he signed with TSG Hoffenheim on a three-year contract.

=== 1. FC Köln ===
On 31 July 2025, Bülter signed a two-season contract with 1. FC Köln.

== Career statistics ==
As of match played 1 November 2026

Appearances and goals by club, season and competition
| Club | Season | League | | | DFB-Pokal | | Europe | | Total | |
| Club | Season | Division | Apps | Goals | Apps | Goals | Apps | Goals | Apps | Goals |
|---|---|---|---|---|---|---|---|---|---|---|
| SuS Neuenkirchen | 2013–14 | Oberliga Westfalen | 32 | 13 | — | | — | | 32 | 13 |
| SV Rödinghausen | 2014–15 | Regionalliga West | 30 | 8 | — | | — | | 30 | 8 |
| SV Rödinghausen | 2015–16 | Regionalliga West | 30 | 7 | — | | — | | 30 | 7 |
| SV Rödinghausen | 2016–17 | Regionalliga West | 24 | 4 | — | | — | | 24 | 4 |
| SV Rödinghausen | 2017–18 | Regionalliga West | 30 | 20 | — | | — | | 30 | 20 |
| SV Rödinghausen | Total | | 114 | 39 | — | | — | | 114 | 39 |
| 1. FC Magdeburg | 2018–19 | 2. Bundesliga | 32 | 4 | 1 | 0 | — | | 33 | 4 |
| Union Berlin | 2019–20 | Bundesliga | 32 | 7 | 4 | 0 | — | | 36 | 7 |
| Union Berlin | 2020–21 | Bundesliga | 26 | 1 | 2 | 0 | — | | 28 | 1 |
| Union Berlin | Total | | 58 | 8 | 6 | 0 | — | | 64 | 8 |
| Schalke 04 | 2021–22 | 2. Bundesliga | 32 | 10 | 2 | 2 | — | | 34 | 12 |
| Schalke 04 | 2022–23 | Bundesliga | 33 | 11 | 2 | 0 | — | | 35 | 11 |
| Schalke 04 | Total | | 65 | 21 | 4 | 2 | — | | 69 | 23 |
| TSG Hoffenheim | 2023–24 | Bundesliga | 30 | 1 | 2 | 1 | — | | 32 | 1 |
| TSG Hoffenheim | 2024–25 | Bundesliga | 25 | 7 | 2 | 1 | 4 (Note: Appearances in UEFA Europa League) | 0 | 31 | 8 |
| TSG Hoffenheim | Total | | 55 | 8 | 4 | 2 | 4 | 0 | 63 | 10 |
| 1. FC Köln | 2025–26 | Bundesliga | 32 | 5 | 2 | 0 | — | | 34 | 5 |
| 1. FC Köln | 2026–27 | Bundesliga | 7 | 0 | 2 | 0 | — | | 9 | 0 |
| 1. FC Köln | Total | | 39 | 5 | 4 | 0 | — | | 43 | 5 |
| Career total | | | 395 | 98 | 19 | 4 | 4 | 0 | 418 | 102 |

== Honours ==
Schalke 04

- 2. Bundesliga: 2021–22
