= 2021–22 FC Ingolstadt 04 season =

FC Ingolstadt 04
2021–22 season
- Chairman: Peter Jackwerth
- Manager: Tomas Oral
- Stadium: Audi Sportpark
- 2. Bundesliga: 18th (relegated)
- DFB-Pokal: Second round
- Top goalscorer: League: Filip Bilbija (7); All: Filip Bilbija (8)
Home colours	Away colours	Third colours

The 2021–22 FC Ingolstadt 04 season was the 18th edition of FC Ingolstadt 04's existence, the club's first season return in the 2. Bundesliga, the second tier of German football, following their promotion from the 3. Liga in the 2020–21 season. The club contested in the DFB-Pokal.

== Background ==
Ingolstadt finished 3rd in the 2020–21 3. Liga, level on points with second-placed Hansa Rostock and losing out on automatic promotion as a result of their inferior goal difference, although they did qualify for the play-offs. They won the promotion play-offs 4–3 on aggregate against VfL Osnabrück and were promoted as a result.

== Competitions ==
=== 2. Bundesliga ===
==== League table ====
Pos	Team	Pld	W	D	L	GF	GA	GD	Pts	Promotion, qualification or relegation
14	SV Sandhausen	34	10	11	13	42	54	−12	41	
15	Jahn Regensburg	34	10	10	14	50	51	−1	40	
16	Dynamo Dresden (R)	34	7	11	16	33	46	−13	32	Qualification for relegation play-offs
17	Erzgebirge Aue (R)	34	6	8	20	32	72	−40	26	Relegation to 3. Liga
18	FC Ingolstadt (R)	34	4	9	21	30	65	−35	21	Relegation to 3. Liga

Source: DFB
Rules for classification: 1) Points; 2) Goal difference; 3) Goals scored; 4) Head-to-head points; 5) Head-to-head goal difference; 6) Head-to-head away goals scored; 7) Away goals scored; 8) Play-off.
(R) Relegated

==== Matches ====
2. Bundesliga match details
Match	Date	Time	Opponent	Venue	Result F–A	Scorers	Attendance	League position	Ref.
1	24 July 2021	13:30	Dynamo Dresden	Away	0–3	—	7,102	17th	
2	31 July 2021	13:30	1. FC Heidenheim	Home	1–2	Bilbija 59'	3,360	15th	
3	15 August 2021	13:30	Darmstadt 98	Away	1–6	Kutschke 50'	4,506	17th	
4	22 August 2021	13:30	1. FC Nürnberg	Home	0–0	—	3,533	17th	
5	27 August 2021	18:30	SV Sandhausen	Away	2–0	Bilbija 39', Kaya 87'	3,153	16th	
6	11 September 2021	13:30	Werder Bremen	Home	0–3	—	5,825	17th	
7	19 September 2021	13:30	FC St. Pauli	Away	1–4	Röhl 72'	13,917	17th	
8	25 September 2021	13:30	Fortuna Düsseldorf	Home	1–2	Kaya 90+3' pen.	4,572	17th	
9	3 October 2021	13:30	Schalke 04	Away	0–3	—	26,546	18th	
10	16 October 2021	13:30	Holstein Kiel	Home	1–1	Kutschke 46'	9,402	17th	
11	22 October 2021	18:30	Erzgebirge Aue	Away	0–1	—	7,349	18th	
12	31 October 2021	13:30	Jahn Regensburg	Home	0–3	—	7,024	18th	
13	6 November 2021	13:30	SC Paderborn	Away	1–2	Kaya 70'	6,625	18th	
14	21 November 2021	13:30	Karlsruher SC	Home	1–1	Kobald 27' o.g.	4,348	18th	
15	28 November 2021	13:30	Hamburger SV	Away	0–3	—	19,937	18th	
16	4 December 2021	13:30	Hansa Rostock	Away	1–1	Keller 41'	1,000	18th	
17	11 December 2021	13:30	Hannover 96	Home	1–2	Gaus 29'	0 (Note: Match played behind closed doors.)	18th	
18	18 December 2021	13:30	Dynamo Dresden	Home	3–0	Antonitsch 1', Ehlers 17' o.g., Bilbija 85'	0	18th	
19	16 January 2022	13:30	1. FC Heidenheim	Away	1–2	Gebauer 47'	500	18th	
20	22 January 2022	13:30	Darmstadt 98	Home	0–2	—	0	18th	
21	4 February 2022	18:30	1. FC Nürnberg	Away	5–0	Pick 13', Eckert 17', Bilbija 41', Schmidt 49', Sulejmani 80'	10,000	18th	
22	13 February 2022	13:30	SV Sandhausen	Home	0–0	—	4,247	18th	
23	19 February 2022	13:30	Werder Bremen	Away	1–1	Bilbija 85'	15,000	17th	
24	26 February 2022	13:30	FC St. Pauli	Home	1–3	Eckert 34'	5,511	18th	
25	6 March 2022	13:30	Fortuna Düsseldorf	Away	0–3	—	15,200	18th	
26	13 March 2022	13:30	Schalke 04	Home	0–3	—	7,593	18th	
27	20 March 2022	13:30	Holstein Kiel	Away	0–1	—	9,163	18th	
28	1 April 2022	18:30	Erzgebirge Aue	Home	3–2	Schmidt 24', Musliu 28', Poulsen 90+1'	4,189	18th	
29	8 April 2022	18:30	Jahn Regensburg	Away	1–1	Guwara 36' o.g.	12,089	17th	
30	17 April 2022	13:30	SC Paderborn	Home	0–1	—	4,219	18th	
31	22 April 2022	18:30	Karlsruher SC	Away	2–2	Schmidt 24' pen., Bilbija 46'	16,655	18th	
32	30 April 2022	13:30	Hamburger SV	Home	0–4	—	8,081	18th	
33	7 May 2022	13:30	Hansa Rostock	Home	0–0	—	6,371	18th	
34	15 May 2022	15:30	Hannover 96	Away	2–3	Sulejmani 11', Bilbija 75'	22,300	18th	

=== DFB-Pokal ===
DFB-Pokal match details
Round	Date	Time	Opponent	Venue	Result F–A	Scorers	Attendance	Ref.
First round	9 August 2021	18:30	FC Ingolstadt	Home	2–1	Bilbija 6', Kaya 79'	3,322	
Second round	26 October 2021	20:00	Borussia Dortmund	Away	0–2	—	25,130	

== Transfers ==
=== Transfers in ===
Date	Position	Name	Previous club (Note: Brackets around club names denote the player's contract with that club had expired before he joined Ingolstadt)	Fee	Ref.
1 July 2021	DF	Jan-Hendrik Marx	(Waldhof Mannheim)	Free transfer	

=== Loans in ===
Date	Position	Name	Club	Return	Ref.

=== Transfers out ===
Date	Position	Name	Subsequent club (Note: Brackets around club names denote the player joined that club after his contract with Ingolstadt expired)	Fee	Ref.
1 July 2021	FW	Caiuby		Released	
1 July 2021	MF	Robin Krauße		Released	
1 July 2021	DF	Bjørn Paulsen	(Hammarby IF)	Released	

=== Loans out ===
Date	Position	Name	Club	Return	Ref.
