= David Kopacz =

Polish footballer (born 1999)

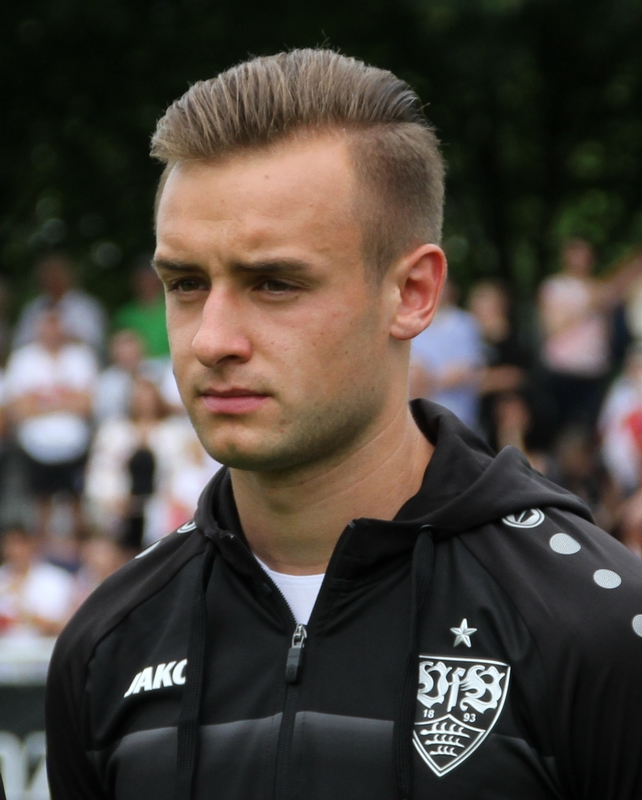
- Kopacz in 2019

Personal information
- Full name: David Peter Kopacz
- Date of birth: 29 May 1999 (age 27)
- Place of birth: Iserlohn, Germany
- Height: 1.80 m (5 ft 11 in)
- Position: Midfielder

Team information
- Current team: Hansa Rostock
- Number: 27

Youth career
- –2007: DJK VfK Iserlohn
- 2007–2018: Borussia Dortmund

Senior career*
| Years | Team | Apps | (Gls) |
| 2018–2020 | VfB Stuttgart | 0 | (0) |
| 2018–2019 | VfB Stuttgart II | 17 | (2) |
| 2019–2020 | → Górnik Zabrze (loan) | 23 | (0) |
| 2019–2020 | → Górnik Zabrze II (loan) | 3 | (2) |
| 2020–2022 | Würzburger Kickers | 64 | (7) |
| 2022–2025 | FC Ingolstadt | 89 | (12) |
| 2025–2026 | VfL Osnabrück | 27 | (8) |
| 2026– | Hansa Rostock | 1 | (0) |

International career
| 2014 | Poland U15 | 4 | (1) |
| 2015 | Poland U16 | 6 | (1) |
| 2015–2016 | Poland U17 | 7 | (3) |
| 2016–2017 | Poland U18 | 3 | (2) |
| 2018 | Poland U19 | 3 | (2) |
| 2018–2019 | Poland U20 | 11 | (0) |
| 2017 | Poland U21 | 2 | (0) |
- * Club domestic league appearances and goals as of 20:44, 2 September 2026 (UTC)

David Peter Kopacz (born 29 May 1999) is a professional footballer who plays as a midfielder for 3. Liga club Hansa Rostock. Born in Germany, he has represented Poland at youth international levels.

== Career ==
In the summer of 2018, Kopacz joined VfB Stuttgart on a four-year deal. On 16 July 2019, he was loaned out to Górnik Zabrze until the end of the 2019–20 season. On 5 August 2019, Kopacz made his debut in the Ekstraklasa against Wisła Kraków.

On 31 July 2020, Kopacz moved to Würzburger Kickers.

On 16 May 2022, he joined FC Ingolstadt.

On 2 June 2025, Kopacz signed with fellow 3. Liga side VfL Osnabrück.

After winning the 3. Liga with VfL Osnabrück in 2026, Kopacz made two 2. Bundesliga appearances for the club before moving back to the third tier and joining Hansa Rostock on 28 August 2026.

== Honours ==
VfL Osnabrück

- 3. Liga: 2025–26
