= Mërgim Berisha =

German footballer (born 1998)

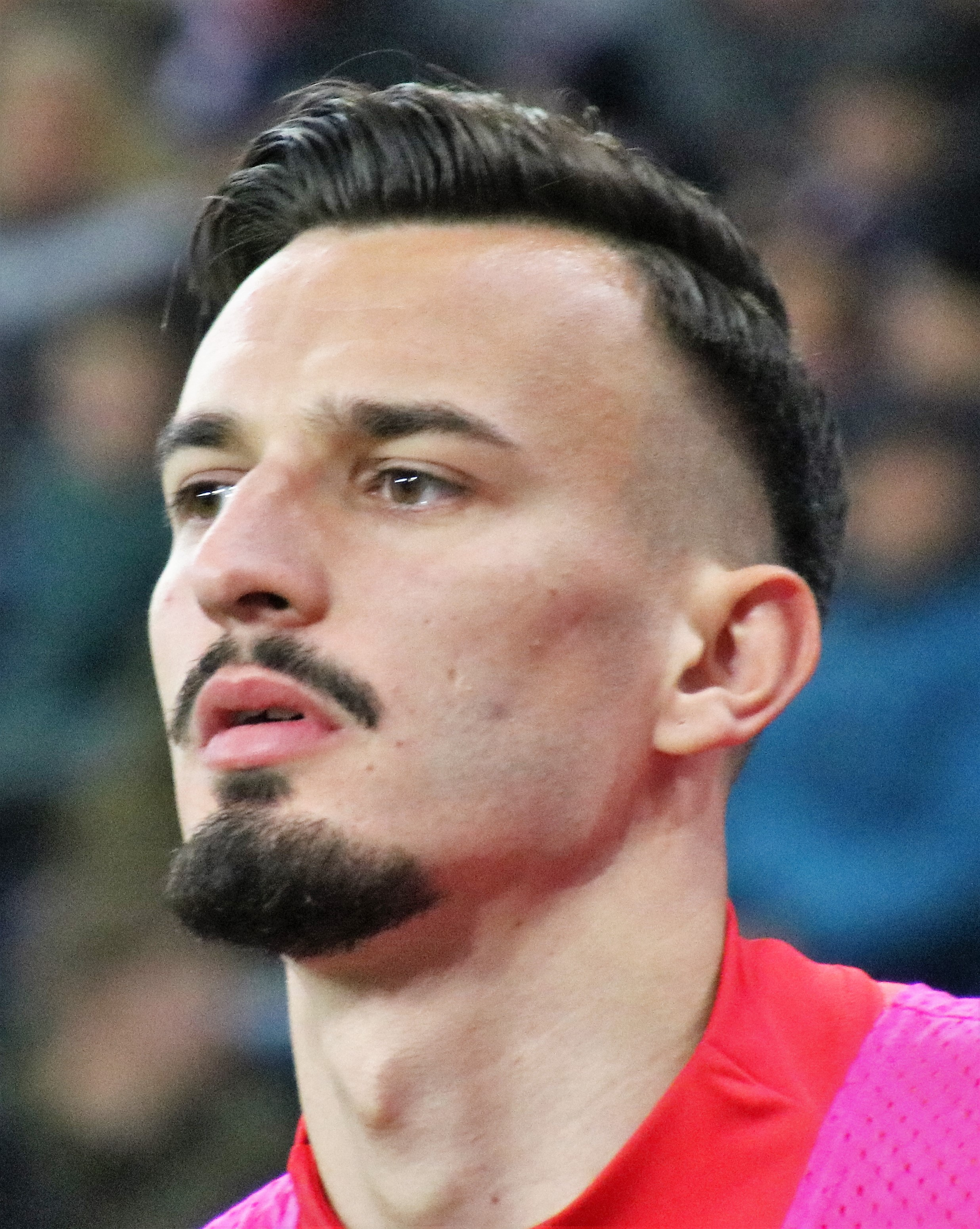
- Berisha with Red Bull Salzburg in 2020

Personal information
- Date of birth: 11 May 1998 (age 28)
- Place of birth: Berchtesgaden, Germany
- Height: 1.88 m (6 ft 2 in)
- Position: Forward

Team information
- Current team: 1. FC Kaiserslautern
- Number: 20

Youth career
- 2008–2016: Red Bull Salzburg

Senior career*
Years	Team	Apps	(Gls)
2014–2017	FC Liefering	41	(17)
2017–2021	Red Bull Salzburg	39	(16)
2017–2018	→ LASK (loan)	18	(5)
2018	→ 1. FC Magdeburg (loan)	4	(0)
2019–2020	→ Rheindorf Altach (loan)	31	(14)
2021–2023	Fenerbahçe	23	(5)
2022–2023	→ FC Augsburg (loan)	23	(9)
2023	FC Augsburg	2	(0)
2023–2026	TSG Hoffenheim	17	(1)
2025	→ FC Augsburg (loan)	2	(0)
2026–	1. FC Kaiserslautern	11	(2)

International career^{‡}
2019–2021	Germany U21	13	(1)
2023–	Germany	2	(0)
Medal record
Germany U21
UEFA European Under-21 Championship
Winner	2021
- * Club domestic league appearances and goals as of 18 May 2026 ‡ National team caps and goals as of 20:42, 28 March 2023 (UTC)

Mërgim Berisha (born 11 May 1998) is a German professional footballer who plays as a forward for 2. Bundesliga club 1. FC Kaiserslautern. He also played two matches for the Germany national team in 2023.

== Club career ==
=== FC Liefering ===
On 7 November 2014, Berisha made his debut with FC Liefering as a professional footballer against Mattersburg after coming on as a substitute at 73rd minute in place of Daniel Ripić and just 50 seconds after his substitution scored his side's third goal during a 3–1 home win.

=== Red Bull Salzburg ===
On 28 December 2016, Berisha signed his first professional contract with Austrian Bundesliga side Red Bull Salzburg after agreeing to a four-year deal. On 3 April 2017, he made his debut in a 0–5 away win against SC Rheindorf Altach after coming on as a substitute at 77th minute in place of Wanderson. Berisha helped his team winning the 2016–17 UEFA Youth League by being one of the top scorers in the tournament, scoring seven goals in total.

==== Loan at LASK ====
On 21 August 2017, Berisha joined Austrian Bundesliga side LASK, on a season-long loan. Five days later, he made his debut in a 1–0 away defeat against Rapid Wien after being named in the starting line-up.

==== Loan at 1. FC Magdeburg ====
On 19 June 2018, Berisha joined 2. Bundesliga side 1. FC Magdeburg, on a season-long loan. Two months later, he made his debut with 1. FC Magdeburg in the 2018–19 DFB-Pokal first round against Darmstadt 98 after coming on as a substitute at 81st minute in place of Tobias Müller.

==== Loan at Rheindorf Altach ====
On 10 January 2019, Berisha joined Austrian Bundesliga side Rheindorf Altach, on a 1 1/2-season loan. On 23 February 2019, he made his debut in a 0–0 away draw against Wolfsberger AC after being named in the starting line-up.

==== Return to Red Bull Salzburg ====
===== 2019–20 season =====
On 6 January 2020, Berisha returned to Austrian Bundesliga side Red Bull Salzburg. On 14 February 2020, he played the first game after the return in a 2–3 home defeat against former club LASK after coming on as a substitute in the 59th minute in place of Patrick Farkas.

===== 2020–21 season =====
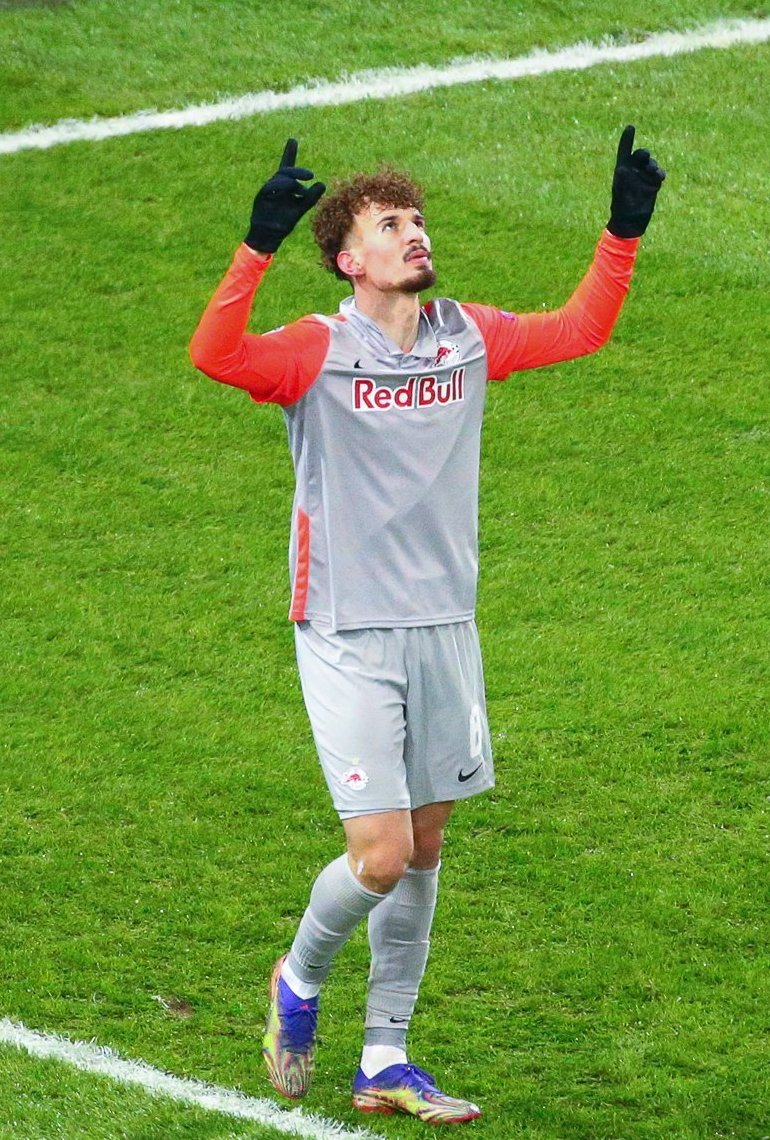
Berisha pointing to the sky after scoring against Lokomotiv Moscow in the UEFA Champions League group stage in December 2020

On 13 September 2020, Berisha commenced his season with the club by winning in the opening match of the season against Wolfsberger AC after being named in the starting line-up.

On 3 November, Berisha scored his first UEFA Champions League goal in a 2–6 defeat against German side Bayern Munich in the 2020–21 season, he also scored in the away tie in Munich as Salzburg lost 3–1. On 1 December, Berisha scored two goals against Russian side Lokomotiv Moscow, which allowed Red Bull Salzburg to win the match in Moscow 3–1, to secure third place in the group and reach the 2020–21 UEFA Europa League knockout phase.

On 1 May 2021, Berisha scored Salzburg's opening goal in a 3–0 win against his former club LASK in the final of the Austrian Cup, securing the club's third straight domestic cup title.

=== Fenerbahçe ===
On 2 September 2021, Berisha signed a four-year contract with Süper Lig club Fenerbahçe and received squad number 11.

==== Loan at FC Augsburg ====
On 31 August 2022, Berisha joined FC Augsburg on loan with an option to buy.

=== FC Augsburg ===
On 2 July 2023, Fenerbahçe announced that FC Augsburg had triggered the buy-option and acquired Berisha permanently, for a fee reported to be around €4 million.

=== TSG Hoffenheim ===
On 30 August 2023, Bundesliga club TSG Hoffenheim announced the signing of Berisha on a four-year contract, for a reported fee of €14 million.

==== Return to FC Augsburg ====
On 28 January 2025, Berisha returned to FC Augsburg on loan.

=== Kaiserslautern ===
On 2 February 2026, Berisha signed with 1. FC Kaiserslautern in 2. Bundesliga.

== International career ==
On 7 October 2019, Berisha received a call-up from Germany U21 for the friendly match against Spain U21 and 2021 UEFA European Under-21 Championship qualification match against Bosnia and Herzegovina U21. Three days later, he made his debut with Germany U21 in a friendly match against Spain U21 after coming on as a substitute at 46th minute in place of Janni Serra.

On 17 March 2023, he received his first official call-up to the German senior national team for the friendlies against Peru and Belgium.

== Personal life ==
Berisha was born in Berchtesgaden, Germany, to Kosovo Albanian parents from Suhareka.

== Career statistics ==
=== Club ===
As of match played 20 April 2025

Appearances and goals by club, season and competition
Club	Season	League			National cup (Note: Includes Austrian Cup, Turkish Cup, DFB-Pokal)		Continental		Total	
Club	Season	Division	Apps	Goals	Apps	Goals	Apps	Goals	Apps	Goals
FC Liefering	2014–15	Austrian First League	3	1	0	0	—		3	1
FC Liefering	2015–16	Austrian First League	8	2	0	0	—		8	2
FC Liefering	2016–17	Austrian First League	30	14	0	0	—		30	14
FC Liefering	Total		41	17	0	0	—		41	17
Red Bull Salzburg	2016–17	Austrian Bundesliga	1	0	1	0	0	0	2	0
Red Bull Salzburg	2017–18	Austrian Bundesliga	0	0	1	0	0	0	1	0
Red Bull Salzburg	2019–20	Austrian Bundesliga	8	1	1	0	1 (Note: Appearance(s) in UEFA Europa League)	0	10	1
Red Bull Salzburg	2020–21	Austrian Bundesliga	28	14	4	3	10 (Note: Eight appearances and four goals in UEFA Champions League, two appearances and one goal in UEFA Europa League)	5	42	22
Red Bull Salzburg	2021–22	Austrian Bundesliga	2	1	0	0	1 (Note: Appearance(s) in UEFA Champions League)	0	3	1
Red Bull Salzburg	Total		39	16	7	3	12	5	58	24
LASK (loan)	2017–18	Austrian Bundesliga	18	5	2	1	—		20	6
1. FC Magdeburg (loan)	2018–19	2. Bundesliga	4	0	1	0	—		5	0
Rheindorf Altach (loan)	2018–19	Austrian Bundesliga	14	7	0	0	—		14	7
Rheindorf Altach (loan)	2019–20	Austrian Bundesliga	17	7	3	2	—		20	9
Rheindorf Altach (loan)	Total		31	14	3	2	—		34	16
Fenerbahçe	2021–22	Süper Lig	22	4	1	0	8 (Note: Six appearances and two goals in UEFA Europa League, two appearances and one goal in UEFA Europa Conference League)	3	31	7
Fenerbahçe	2022–23	Süper Lig	1	1	0	0	0	0	1	1
Fenerbahçe	Total		23	5	1	0	8	3	32	8
FC Augsburg (loan)	2022–23	Bundesliga	23	9	0	0	—		23	9
FC Augsburg	2023–24	Bundesliga	2	0	1	0	—		3	0
FC Augsburg	Total		25	9	1	0	—		26	9
TSG Hoffenheim	2023–24	Bundesliga	6	0	1	0	—		7	0
TSG Hoffenheim	2024–25	Bundesliga	11	1	3	0	3	0	17	1
TSG Hoffenheim	Total		17	1	4	0	3	0	24	1
FC Augsburg (loan)	2024–25	Bundesliga	2	0	—		—		2	0
Career total			200	67	19	6	23	8	242	81

=== International ===
As of match played 28 March 2023

Appearances and goals by national team and year
National team	Year	Apps	Goals
Germany	2023	2	0
Total		2	0

== Honours ==
Red Bull Salzburg Youth

- UEFA Youth League: 2016–17

Red Bull Salzburg

- Austrian Bundesliga: 2016–17, 2019–20, 2020–21
- Austrian Cup: 2016–17, 2019–20, 2020–21
