= Poland national youth football team =

The Poland national youth football teams are a group of six teams that represents Poland in association football at various specific age levels, ranging from under-16 to under-21. All of the teams are controlled by Polish Football Association, the governing body for football in Poland.

The six teams are the following:

- Poland national under-21 football team
- Poland national under-20 football team
- Poland national under-19 football team
- Poland national under-18 football team
- Poland national under-17 football team
- Poland national under-16 football team
