= Fabian Cavadias =

German footballer

Personal information
- Date of birth: 4 September 2001 (age 25)
- Place of birth: Heimstetten, Germany
- Height: 1.85 m (6 ft 1 in)
- Position: Defender

Team information
- Current team: SV Heimstetten
- Number: 5

Youth career
- –2016: SV Heimstetten
- 2016–2018: Bayern Munich
- 2018–2019: SpVgg Unterhaching

Senior career*
Years	Team	Apps	(Gls)
2019–2021	SV Heimstetten	24	(3)
2021–2024	FC Ingolstadt	6	(0)
2021–2024	FC Ingolstadt II	44	(8)
2022–2023	→ Schweinfurt 05 (loan)	1	(0)
2024–	SV Heimstetten	1	(0)
- * Club domestic league appearances and goals as of 19 July 2024

Fabian Cavadias (born 4 September 2001) is a German professional footballer who plays as a defender for Bayernliga club SV Heimstetten.
