= Dominik Franke =

German footballer

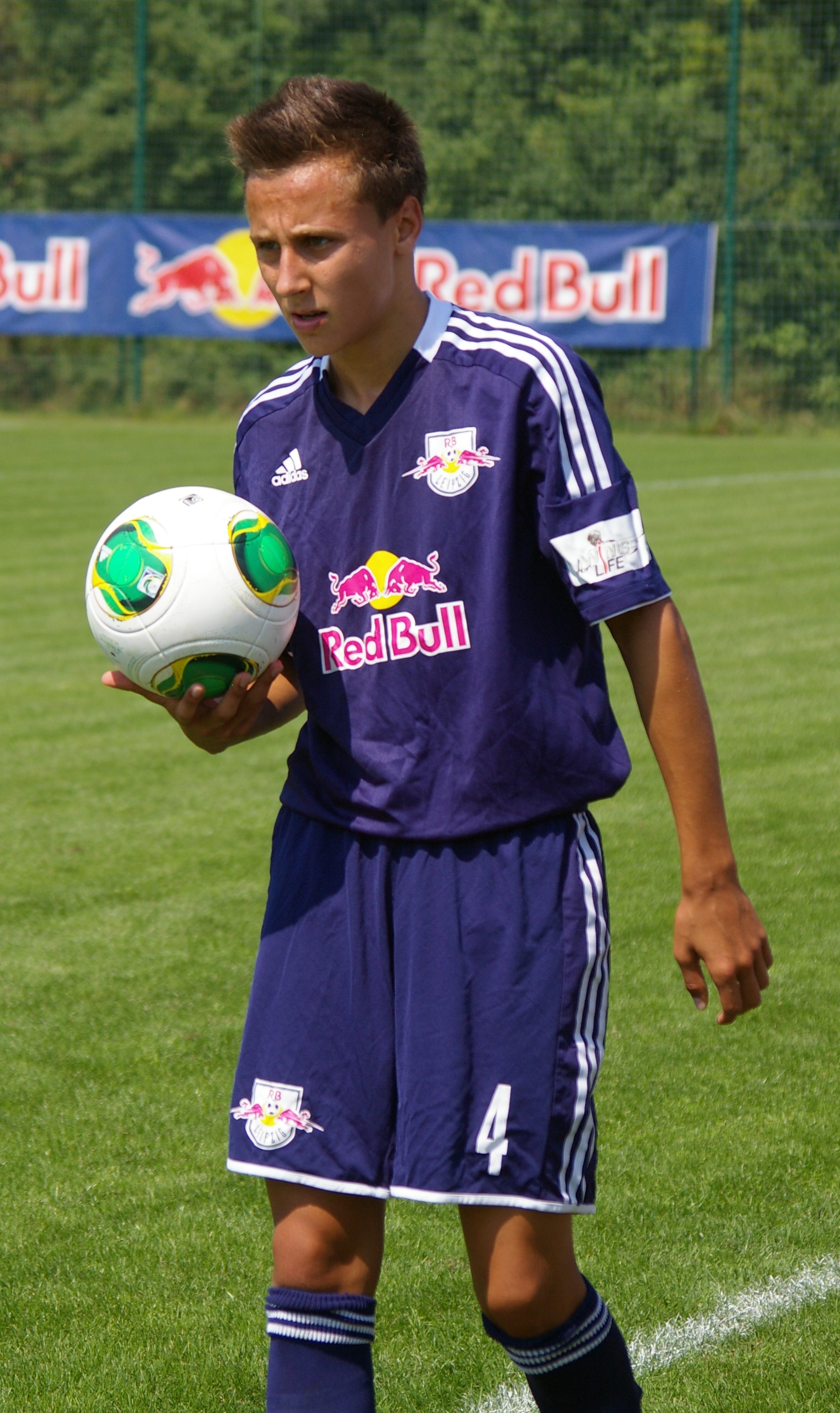
- Franke playing for RB Leipzig in 2013

Personal information
- Date of birth: 5 October 1998 (age 28)
- Place of birth: Riesa, Germany
- Height: 1.84 m (6 ft 0 in)
- Position: Left-back

Team information
- Current team: FK Žalgiris
- Number: 19

Youth career
- –2011: SC Riesa
- 2011–2017: RB Leipzig

Senior career*
Years	Team	Apps	(Gls)
2016–2017	RB Leipzig II	30	(1)
2016–2017	RB Leipzig	0	(0)
2017–2020	VfL Wolfsburg II	58	(2)
2018–2020	VfL Wolfsburg	0	(0)
2019–2020	→ Wehen Wiesbaden (loan)	10	(0)
2020–2023	FC Ingolstadt 04	75	(0)
2023–2026	FC Thun	51	(1)
2026–	FK Žalgiris	10	(0)

International career
2015–2016	Germany U18	8	(0)
2016–2017	Germany U19	10	(0)
2017	Germany U20	3	(0)
- * Club domestic league appearances and goals as of 7 September 2026

Dominik Franke (born 5 October 1998) is a German professional footballer who plays as a left-back for TOPLYGA club Žalgiris (Vilnius).

== Career ==
Franke made his professional debut for Wehen Wiesbaden in the 2. Bundesliga on 4 August 2019, coming on as a substitute in the 33rd minute for Michel Niemeyer in the 3–2 away loss against Erzgebirge Aue.

In October 2023, Franke joined Swiss Challenge League club FC Thun on a contract until the end of the season. He helped Thun win the 2024–25 Swiss Challenge League, and the following season their first ever first division title, the 2025–26 Swiss Super League.

=== FK Žalgiris ===
On 5 June 2026 lithuanian Žalgiris Club officially announced about agreement with Dominik franke.

== Honours ==
Thun

- Swiss Super League: 2025–26
- Swiss Challenge League: 2024–25
