= Jalen Hawkins =

American soccer player (born 2001)

Personal information
- Date of birth: January 24, 2001 (age 25)
- Place of birth: Regensburg, Germany
- Height: 1.77 m (5 ft 10 in)
- Position: Forward

Team information
- Current team: ADO Den Haag
- Number: 77

Youth career
- –2015: FC Ingolstadt 04
- 2015–2018: Bayern Munich
- 2018–2020: FC Ingolstadt 04

Senior career*
Years	Team	Apps	(Gls)
2020–2023	FC Ingolstadt 04	41	(2)
2020–2023	FC Ingolstadt 04 II	2	(0)
2022	→ 1. FC Saarbrücken (loan)	9	(1)
2023–2024	SV Waldhof Mannheim	34	(4)
2024–2026	Emmen	45	(12)
2026–	ADO Den Haag	16	(1)

International career
2018	United States U18	2	(0)
- * Club domestic league appearances and goals as of October 24, 2026

Jalen Hawkins (born January 24, 2001) is a professional soccer player who plays as a forward for Eredivisie club ADO Den Haag. Born in Germany, Hawkins has represented the United States at youth international level.

== Career ==
After playing in the academies of Bayern Munich and FC Ingolstadt 04, Hawkins made his professional debut for Ingolstadt on June 16, 2021, coming on as a substitute in a 0–0 draw vs. Eintracht Braunschweig.

On January 31, 2022, Hawkins joined 1. FC Saarbrücken on loan until the end of the season.

On June 13, 2023, Hawkins agreed to join SV Waldhof Mannheim in 3. Liga.

On July 2, 2024, Hawkins signed a contract with Dutch club Emmen for two seasons, with an optional third season.

On February 3, 2026, ADO Den Haag announced the signing of Hawkins on a contract until 2028.

== Career statistics ==
As of October 24, 2026

Appearances and goals by club, season and competition
Club	Season	League			National cup (Note: Includes DFB-Pokal)		Other		Total	
Club	Season	Division	Apps	Goals	Apps	Goals	Apps	Goals	Apps	Goals
FC Ingolstadt 04	2019–20	3. Liga	4	0	0	0	1 (Note: Appearance(s) in Promotion/relegation play-offs)	0	5	0
FC Ingolstadt 04	2020–21	3. Liga	6	0	—		0	0	6	0
FC Ingolstadt 04	2021–22	2. Bundesliga	6	0	0	0	0	0	6	0
FC Ingolstadt 04	2022–23	3. Liga	25	2	1	0	4 (Note: Appearances in Bavarian Cup)	1	30	3
FC Ingolstadt 04	Total		41	2	1	0	5	1	47	3
1. FC Saarbrücken (loan)	2021–22	3. Liga	9	1	—		0	0	9	1
SV Waldhof Mannheim	2023–24	3. Liga	34	4	0	0	3 (Note: Appearances in Baden Cup)	0	37	4
Emmen	2024–25	Eerste Divisie	38	11	1	0	—		39	11
Emmen	2025–26	Eerste Divisie	7	1	—		—		7	1
Emmen	Total		45	12	1	0	—		46	12
ADO Den Haag	2025–26	Eerste Divisie	7	1	—		—		7	1
ADO Den Haag	2026–27	Eredivisie	9	0	0	0	—		9	0
ADO Den Haag	Total		16	1	0	0	—		16	1
Career total			145	20	2	0	8	1	155	21

== Honours ==
ADO Den Haag

- Eerste Divisie: 2025–26
