= Tobias Schröck =

German footballer (born 1992

Personal information
- Date of birth: 31 December 1992 (age 33)
- Place of birth: Mühldorf, Germany
- Height: 1.88 m (6 ft 2 in)
- Position: Centre-back

Team information
- Current team: FC Pipinsried
- Number: 21

Senior career*
Years	Team	Apps	(Gls)
2010–2015	Wacker Burghausen	80	(8)
2012–2023	Wacker Burghausen II	22	(5)
2015–2016	Sonnenhof Großaspach	27	(0)
2016–2017	Würzburger Kickers	29	(4)
2017–2024	FC Ingolstadt	121	(4)
2018	FC Ingolstadt 04 II	3	(0)
2025	FC Ingolstadt 04 II	11	(2)
2025–	FC Pipinsried	8	(0)
- * Club domestic league appearances and goals as of 19:23, 25 September 2025 (UTC)

Tobias Schröck (born 31 December 1992) is a German professional footballer who plays as a midfielder for Bayernliga club FC Pipinsried.

== Career ==
In 2011, Schröck was promoted from the youth to the Wacker Burghausen senior squad. He had a contract with Wacker Burghausen until 2015. In May 2015, he signed a contract with SG Sonnenhof Großaspach until 2017. In June 2016, after his club Würzburger Kickers were relegated to the 3. Liga, he signed for 2. Bundesliga side FC Ingolstadt until 2021.

On 9 July 2025, Schröck signed a two-year contract with Bayernliga club FC Pipinsried.
