= Philipp Harant =

German footballer

Personal information
- Date of birth: 20 February 1999 (age 27)
- Place of birth: Schönebeck, Germany
- Height: 1.94 m (6 ft 4 in)
- Position: Centre-back

Team information
- Current team: FSV Zwickau
- Number: 26

Youth career
- –2010: Schönebecker SV
- 2010–2018: 1. FC Magdeburg

Senior career*
Years	Team	Apps	(Gls)
2017–2022	1. FC Magdeburg	12	(0)
2019	→ Germania Halberstadt (loan)	13	(0)
2021–2022	→ Berliner AK 07 (loan)	29	(1)
2022–2024	Chemie Leipzig	57	(7)
2024–2026	FSV Schöningen	55	(28)
2026–	FSV Zwickau	16	(5)
- * Club domestic league appearances and goals as of 20 November 2026

Philipp Harant (born 20 February 1999) is a German professional footballer who plays as a centre-back for Regionalliga Nordost club FSV Zwickau.

== Playing career ==
Harant made his professional debut for 1. FC Magdeburg in the 3. Liga on 20 July 2019, coming on as a substitute in the 87th minute for Jürgen Gjasula in the 4–2 home loss against Eintracht Braunschweig.
