= Visar Musliu =

Macedonian footballer

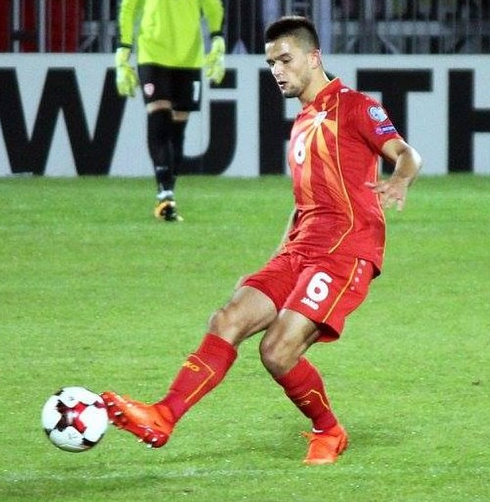

Personal information
- Date of birth: 13 November 1994 (age 32)
- Place of birth: Gostivar, Macedonia
- Height: 1.87 m (6 ft 2 in)
- Position: Centre-back

Team information
- Current team: Sint-Truiden
- Number: 26

Youth career
- Gostivar
- Renova

Senior career*
| Years | Team | Apps | (Gls) |
| 2012–2014 | Renova | 29 | (1) |
| 2012 | → Gostivar (loan) | | |
| 2014–2015 | St. Gallen U21 | 0 | (0) |
| 2015 | → Renova (loan) | 13 | (1) |
| 2015–2017 | Renova | 63 | (7) |
| 2017–2018 | Vardar | 11 | (1) |
| 2018 | Prishtina | 0 | (0) |
| 2018 | → Shkëndija (loan) | 15 | (2) |
| 2018–2019 | Shkëndija | 29 | (4) |
| 2019–2022 | Fehérvár | 60 | (2) |
| 2022–2023 | FC Ingolstadt | 39 | (1) |
| 2023–2025 | SC Paderborn | 33 | (3) |
| 2025– | Sint-Truiden | 39 | (0) |

International career^{‡}
| 2014–2017 | Macedonia U21 | 12 | (0) |
| 2017– | North Macedonia | 80 | (2) |
- * Club domestic league appearances and goals as of 31 May 2026 ‡ National team caps and goals as of 16 November 2026

Visar Musliu (Macedonian: Висар Муслиу; born 13 November 1994) is a Macedonian professional footballer who plays as a centre-back for Belgian Pro League club Sint-Truiden and the North Macedonia national team.

== Club career ==
Musliu started his football career in FK Renova where he spent most of his first five years. In between, he also spent six months on loan at FK Gostivar. The summer in 2014, he transferred to Swiss side St. Gallen on a one-year contract, but he didn't get to play there as they sent him back on loan to Renova.

On 3 June 2017, he made a transfer to Macedonian champion FK Vardar where they hired him as a reinforcement for the upcoming Champions League qualifications. In the end, Musliu helped Vardar qualify for the 2017-18 Europa League Group stage, becoming the first Macedonian football club to ever qualify for a European UEFA tournament.

On 5 August 2019, he moved from Shkëndija to Hungarian outfit Fehérvár.

On 19 January 2022, Musliu joined 2. Bundesliga club FC Ingolstadt.

In June 2023, Musliu signed for SC Paderborn following his departure from Ingolstadt.

On 4 February 2025, Musliu moved to Sint-Truiden in Belgium.

== International career ==
Musliu was part of the Macedonia national under-21 football team from 2013 to 2017, winning 12 caps. He was part of the first Macedonia U21 generation that qualified for a final tournament where he also got to play in the last game in the groups, coming in as a substitute in the 28th minute for Marjan Radeski in the match against Portugal.

On 2 September 2017, he also made his debut for the senior national team in a World Cup qualifier against Israel, where Visar played the full game and helped his side keep a clean sheet in the 1–0 victory. As of 1 April 2020, Musliu has earned a total of 20 caps, scoring one goal.

== Career statistics ==
As of end of 2022–23 season

Appearances and goals by club, season and competition
| Club | Season | League | | | Cup | | Continental | | Other | | Total | |
| Club | Season | Division | Apps | Goals | Apps | Goals | Apps | Goals | Apps | Goals | Apps | Goals |
|---|---|---|---|---|---|---|---|---|---|---|---|---|
| Renova | 2012–13 | Macedonian First Football League | 5 | 0 | 0 | 0 | — | | — | | 5 | 0 |
| Renova | 2013–14 | Macedonian First Football League | 24 | 1 | 0 | 0 | — | | — | | 24 | 1 |
| Renova | Total | | 29 | 1 | 0 | 0 | 0 | 0 | 0 | 0 | 29 | 1 |
| Renova (loan) | 2014–15 | Macedonian First Football League | 13 | 1 | 2 | 0 | — | | — | | 15 | 1 |
| Renova | 2015–16 | Macedonian First Football League | 30 | 3 | 0 | 0 | 2 | 0 | — | | 32 | 3 |
| Renova | 2016–17 | Macedonian First Football League | 33 | 4 | 0 | 0 | — | | — | | 33 | 4 |
| Renova | Total | | 63 | 7 | 0 | 0 | 2 | 0 | 0 | 0 | 65 | 7 |
| Vardar | 2017–18 | Macedonian First Football League | 11 | 1 | 0 | 0 | 6 | 0 | — | | 17 | 1 |
| Shkëndija (loan) | 2017–18 | Macedonian First Football League | 15 | 2 | 5 | 3 | 0 | 0 | — | | 20 | 5 |
| Shkëndija | 2018–19 | Macedonian First Football League | 29 | 4 | 2 | 0 | 8 | 0 | — | | 39 | 4 |
| Shkëndija | 2019–20 | Macedonian First Football League | 0 | 0 | 0 | 0 | 4 | 0 | — | | 4 | 0 |
| Shkëndija | Total | | 29 | 4 | 2 | 0 | 12 | 0 | 0 | 0 | 43 | 4 |
| Fehérvár | 2019–20 | Nemzeti Bajnokság I | 26 | 2 | 9 | 1 | 0 | 0 | 0 | 0 | 35 | 3 |
| Fehérvár | 2020–21 | Nemzeti Bajnokság I | 26 | 0 | 3 | 0 | 3 | 0 | 0 | 0 | 32 | 0 |
| Fehérvár | 2021–22 | Nemzeti Bajnokság I | 8 | 0 | 1 | 0 | 1 | 0 | 0 | 0 | 10 | 0 |
| Fehérvár | Total | | 60 | 2 | 13 | 1 | 4 | 0 | 0 | 0 | 77 | 3 |
| FC Ingolstadt | 2021–22 | 2. Bundesliga | 14 | 1 | 0 | 0 | — | | 0 | 0 | 14 | 1 |
| FC Ingolstadt | 2022–23 | 3. Liga | 25 | 0 | 0 | 0 | — | | 0 | 0 | 25 | 0 |
| FC Ingolstadt | Total | | 39 | 1 | 0 | 0 | 0 | 0 | 0 | 0 | 39 | 1 |
| Career total | | | 259 | 19 | 22 | 4 | 24 | 0 | 0 | 0 | 295 | 23 |

=== International ===
Scores and results list North Macedonia's goal tally first, score column indicates score after each Musliu goal.

List of international goals scored by Visar Musliu
| No. | Date | Venue | Opponent | Score | Result | Competition |
|---|---|---|---|---|---|---|
| 1 | 9 October 2017 | Stadion Mladost, Strumica, North Macedonia | Liechtenstein | 1–0 | 4–0 | 2018 FIFA World Cup qualification |
| 2 | 22 March 2025 | Rheinpark Stadion, Vaduz, Liechtenstein | Liechtenstein | 2–0 | 3–0 | 2026 FIFA World Cup qualification |
