= Daniel Mikic =

German footballer

Personal information
- Date of birth: 6 July 1992 (age 34)
- Place of birth: Germany
- Height: 1.84 m (6 ft 0 in)
- Position: Defender

Youth career
- –2010: Arminia Bielefeld

Senior career*
Years	Team	Apps	(Gls)
2010–2013	Arminia Bielefeld II	53	(1)
2013–2025	SC Verl	299	(2)
- * Club domestic league appearances and goals

Daniel Mikic (born 6 July 1992) is a German former professional footballer who played as a defender.
