= Justin Butler =

German footballer

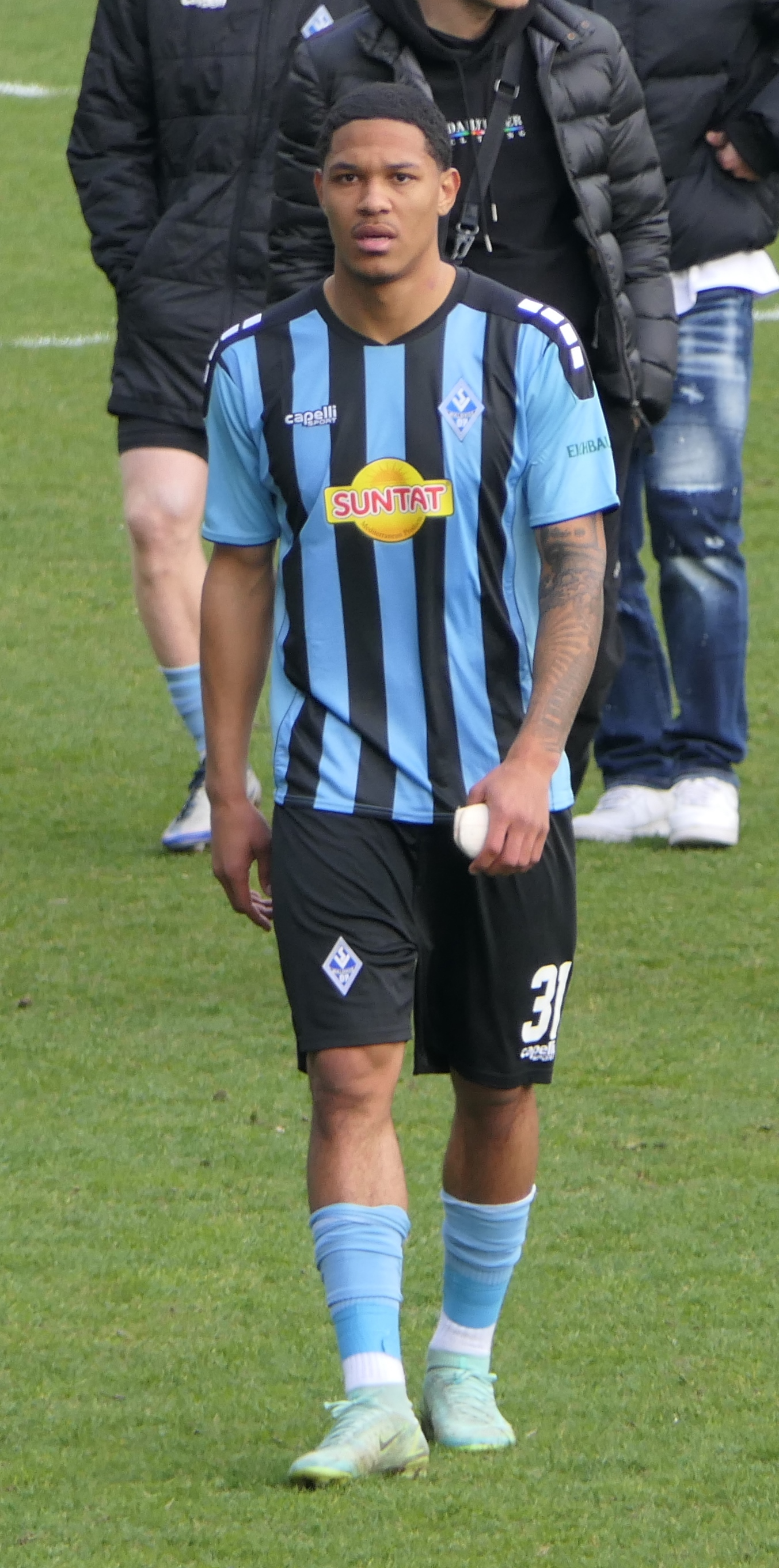

Personal information
- Date of birth: 23 March 2001 (age 25)
- Place of birth: Augsburg, Germany
- Height: 1.85 m (6 ft 1 in)
- Position: Forward

Team information
- Current team: Energie Cottbus
- Number: 31

Youth career
- –2016: FC Augsburg
- 2016–2018: Bayern Munich

Senior career*
Years	Team	Apps	(Gls)
2018–2019	Bayern Munich II	1	(0)
2019–2023	FC Ingolstadt II	3	(1)
2019–2023	FC Ingolstadt	49	(3)
2022	→ Waldhof Mannheim (loan)	10	(0)
2023–2025	Borussia Dortmund II	25	(1)
2025	SV Sandhausen	13	(0)
2025–	Energie Cottbus	29	(2)
- * Club domestic league appearances and goals as of 28 May 2026

Justin Butler (born 23 March 2001) is a German professional footballer who plays as a forward for 2. Bundesliga club Energie Cottbus.

== Club career ==
After playing youth football for FC Augsburg, Butler joined Bayern Munich's academy in 2016. Butler made his debut for Bayern Munich II on 29 October 2018, coming on as a late substitute in a 2–1 win over Wacker Burghausen. He joined FC Ingolstadt 04 in 2019, and made his debut on 24 June 2020, coming on as a substitute in a 2–0 win against Waldhof Mannheim, before making his second and final appearance of the season in a 2–0 defeat to 1. FC Magdeburg on 1 July 2020. He also made one appearance for FC Ingolstadt 04 II in a 5–1 defeat to TSV 1880 Wasserburg on 11 October 2019.

In January 2022 Butler moved to 3. Liga club Waldhof Mannheim on loan for the rest of the 2021–22 season.

On 26 May 2023, Butler was announced to have agreed to join Borussia Dortmund II on a free transfer, signing a five-year contract.

On 3 January 2025, Butler moved to SV Sandhausen.

On 14 July 2025, Butler joined FC Energie Cottbus.

== International career ==
Born in Augsburg, Germany, Butler is also eligible to represent the United States and has previously taken part in a training camp with the United States under-18 team.
