= Philip Türpitz =

German footballer (born 1991)

Personal information
- Date of birth: 23 August 1991 (age 35)
- Place of birth: Laupheim, Germany
- Height: 1.78 m (5 ft 10 in)
- Position: Midfielder

Team information
- Current team: VSG Altglienicke
- Number: 20

Youth career
- 1994–2002: TSV Rißtissen
- 2002–2008: SSV Ulm
- 2008–2009: Stuttgarter Kickers

Senior career*
Years	Team	Apps	(Gls)
2009–2012	Stuttgarter Kickers	71	(11)
2012–2014	Schalke 04 II	32	(5)
2014	Sportfreunde Lotte	12	(4)
2014–2017	Chemnitzer FC	98	(14)
2017–2019	FC Magdeburg	63	(24)
2019–2021	SV Sandhausen	30	(3)
2021	Hansa Rostock	14	(3)
2021–2022	Türkgücü München	24	(6)
2023–	VSG Altglienicke	100	(19)
- * Club domestic league appearances and goals as of 23 September 2026

Philip Türpitz (born 23 August 1991) is a German professional footballer who plays as a midfielder for VSG Altglienicke.
