= Hans Nunoo Sarpei =

Ghanaian footballer

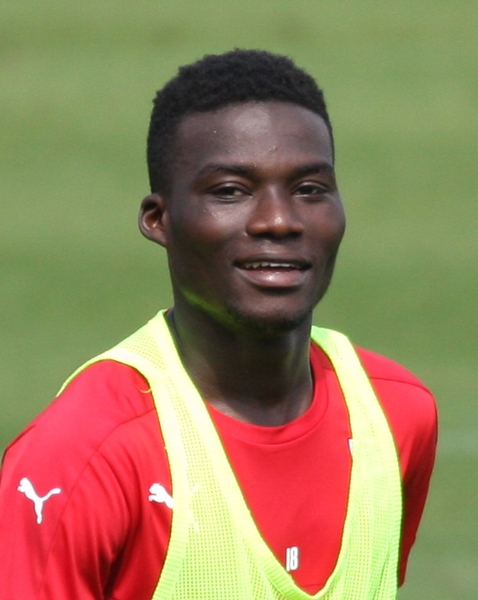
- Sarpei training with VfB Stuttgart in 2016

Personal information
- Date of birth: 22 August 1998 (age 28)
- Place of birth: Accra, Ghana
- Height: 1.78 m (5 ft 10 in)
- Position: Midfielder

Team information
- Current team: SG Barockstadt
- Number: 14

Youth career
- Accra Great Olympics
- Liberty Professionals

Senior career*
Years	Team	Apps	(Gls)
2016–2019	VfB Stuttgart	2	(0)
2017–2018	→ FK Senica (loan)	20	(0)
2019	→ Greuther Fürth (loan)	2	(0)
2019–2021	Greuther Fürth	58	(1)
2022–2023	FC Ingolstadt	36	(1)
2024	HJK	14	(0)
2025–	SG Barockstadt	39	(2)
- * Club domestic league appearances and goals as of 24 September 2026

Hans Nunoo Sarpei (born 22 August 1998) is a Ghanaian professional footballer who plays as a midfielder for German Regionalliga Südwest club SG Barockstadt.

== Career ==
=== VfB Stuttgart ===
In August 2016 Sarpei moved to VfB Stuttgart. He made his professional debut for Stuttgart on 25 October 2016 in the 2016–17 DFB-Pokal against Borussia Mönchengladbach. On 6 October 2018, Sarpei made his Bundesliga debut for VfB Stuttgart against Hannover 96.

==== FK Senica (loan) ====
On 5 September 2017, Sarpei was loaned out to FK Senica until the end of the season.

=== Greuther Fürth ===
In January 2019, Sarpei joined 2. Bundesliga side SpVgg Greuther Fürth on a half-season loan with Greuther Fürth securing an option to sign him permanently. After the season, the club exercised their option for an undisclosed fee. Sarpei scored his first goal for the club in 2. Bundesliga on 28 April 2021, in a 3–2 home win against SV Sandhausen.

=== FC Ingolstadt ===
On 1 January 2022, Sarpei transferred to 2. Bundesliga side FC Ingolstadt. After playing with the team in 3. Liga for the 2022–23 season, he left Ingolstadt in July 2023.

=== HJK Helsinki ===
On 6 February 2024, Sarpei signed with Finnish Veikkausliiga side HJK Helsinki on a two-year deal, with an option to extend for an additional year. He had already debuted for HJK earlier as a test player on 26 January 2024, in a Finnish League Cup win against IFK Mariehamn. On 1 November, his contract was terminated.

== Personal life ==
Sarpei is the nephew of former Ghanaian footballer Hans Sarpei.

== Career statistics ==
=== Clubs ===
As of match played 1 July 2026

Appearances and goals by club, season and competition
Club	Season	Division	League		Cup (Note: Includes DFB Pokal and Finnish Cup)		League cup		Europe		Total	
Club	Season	Division	Apps	Goals	Apps	Goals	Apps	Goals	Apps	Goals	Apps	Goals
VfB Stuttgart	2016–17	Bundesliga	0	0	1	0	—		—		1	0
VfB Stuttgart	2018–19	Bundesliga	2	0	0	0	—		—		2	0
VfB Stuttgart	Total		2	0	1	0	0	0	0	0	3	0
FK Senica (loan)	2017–18	Slovak Super Liga	20	0	0	0	0	0	—		20	0
Greuther Fürth (loan)	2018–19	2. Bundesliga	2	0	0	0	—		—		2	0
Greuther Fürth	2019–20	2. Bundesliga	22	0	0	0	—		—		22	0
Greuther Fürth	2020–21	2. Bundesliga	28	1	3	0	—		—		31	3
Greuther Fürth	2021–22	Bundesliga	8	0	1	0	—		—		9	0
Greuther Fürth	Total		58	1	4	0	0	0	0	0	62	1
FC Ingolstadt	2021–22	2. Bundesliga	6	0	0	0	—		—		6	0
FC Ingolstadt	2022–23	3. Liga	30	1	3	0	—		—		33	1
FC Ingolstadt	Total		36	1	3	0	0	0	0	0	39	1
HJK	2024	Veikkausliiga	14	0	0	0	3 (Note: Includes Finnish League Cup)	0	0	0	17	0
Barockstadt Fulda-Lehnerz	2025–26	Regionalliga Südwest	31	2	0	0	3 (Note: Includes Hessian Cup)	0	0	0	34	2
Career total			163	4	8	0	6	0	0	0	177	4

== Honours ==
=== Greuther Fürth ===
- 2. Bundesliga: 2020–21 Runners-up
