= Rico Preißinger =

German footballer

Personal information
- Date of birth: 21 July 1996 (age 30)
- Place of birth: Münchberg, Germany
- Height: 1.85 m (6 ft 1 in)
- Position: Midfielder

Team information
- Current team: Preußen Münster
- Number: 21

Youth career
- –2008: 1. FC Stammbach
- 2008–2015: 1. FC Nürnberg

Senior career*
Years	Team	Apps	(Gls)
2015–2016	1. FC Nürnberg II	46	(2)
2016–2018	VfR Aalen	69	(6)
2018–2020	1. FC Magdeburg	54	(2)
2020–2023	FC Ingolstadt 04	58	(0)
2023–	Preußen Münster	77	(0)
- * Club domestic league appearances and goals as of 18 May 2026

Rico Preißinger (born 21 July 1996) is a German professional footballer who plays as a midfielder for Preußen Münster in 2. Bundesliga. In his youth career, Preißinger played for FC Stammbach and FC Nürnberg.

== Career statistics ==
As of 1 February 2018

Appearances and goals by club, season and competition
Club	Season	League			Cup		Other		Total	
Club	Season	Division	Apps	Goals	Apps	Goals	Apps	Goals	Apps	Goals
1. FC Nürnberg II	2013–14	Regionalliga Bayern	2	0	0	0	0	0	2	0
1. FC Nürnberg II	2014–15	Regionalliga Bayern	13	1	0	0	0	0	13	1
1. FC Nürnberg II	2015–16	Regionalliga Bayern	31	1	0	0	0	0	31	1
1. FC Nürnberg II	Total		46	2	0	0	0	0	46	2
VfR Aalen	2016–17	3. Liga	36	2	0	0	0	0	36	2
VfR Aalen	2017–18	3. Liga	21	3	0	0	0	0	21	3
VfR Aalen	Total		57	5	0	0	0	0	57	5
Career total			103	7	0	0	0	0	103	7
