= Patrick Schmidt (footballer, born 1993) =

German footballer

Personal information
- Date of birth: 10 September 1993 (age 33)
- Place of birth: Homburg, Germany
- Height: 1.86 m (6 ft 1 in)
- Position: Forward

Team information
- Current team: 1. FC Saarbrücken
- Number: 39

Youth career
- 1997–2003: SV Webenheim
- 2003–2005: Spvgg Einöd-Ingweiler
- 2005–2006: FC Palatia Limbach
- 2006–2009: 1. FC Saarbrücken
- 2009–2012: VfB Stuttgart

Senior career*
Years	Team	Apps	(Gls)
2012–2014	Schalke 04 II	17	(2)
2014	1. FC Saarbrücken	11	(1)
2014–2016	FC Homburg	37	(23)
2016–2018	1. FC Saarbrücken	67	(42)
2018–2021	1. FC Heidenheim	36	(3)
2020	→ Dynamo Dresden (loan)	15	(6)
2021	→ SV Sandhausen (loan)	6	(1)
2021–2023	FC Ingolstadt	55	(13)
2023–	1. FC Saarbrücken	54	(8)

International career
2010–2011	Germany U18	6	(0)
2011	Germany U19	1	(0)
- * Club domestic league appearances and goals as of 30 May 2026

Patrick Schmidt (born 10 September 1993) is a German professional footballer who plays as a forward for 3. Liga club 1. FC Saarbrücken.

== Club career ==
On 30 June 2023, Schmidt returned to former club 1. FC Saarbrücken.
