= 2015–16 TSV 1860 Munich season =

1860 Munich
2015–16 season
- Chairman: Hasan Ismaik
- Head Coach: Torsten Fröhling (to 6 October); Benno Möhlmann (6 October - 19 April); Daniel Bierofka (from 19 April)
- Stadium: Allianz Arena
- 2. Bundesliga: 15th
- DFB-Pokal: Round of 16
- Top goalscorer: League: Rubin Okotie (8); All: Rubin Okotie (9)
- Highest home attendance: 54,100 vs SC Paderborn (8 May 2016)
- Lowest home attendance: 14,100 vs FSV Frankfurt (4 December 2015)
- Average home league attendance: 23,359
Home colours	Away colours	Third colours

The 2015–16 TSV 1860 Munich season was the club's 12th consecutive season in the 2. Bundesliga.

== Season events ==
=== Pre-season ===
On 20 June 2015, prior to the start of the season, Torsten Fröhling extended his contract.

=== July ===
On 13 July, 1860 announced the signing of Rodnei from Red Bull Salzburg, on a contract until the summer of 2017, and that Edu Bedia had left the club in order to sign for Real Oviedo.

On 18 July, 1860 announced the signing of Romuald Lacazette from Paris Saint-Germain, on a contract until the summer of 2017.

=== August ===
On 3 August, Rodri joined Real Valladolid on loan for the season.

On 15 August, 1860 announced the signing of Stefan Mugoša from FC Kaiserslauter, on a contract until the summer of 2018.

=== October ===
Benno Möhlmann replaced Fröhling as head coach on 6 October 2015.

=== January ===
On 13 January, Stephané Mvibudulu left 1860 to sign for Stuttgarter Kickers.

On 18 January, 1860 announced the signing of Jan Mauersberger from Karlsruher SC, on a contract until the summer of 2018.

On 19 January, 1860 announced that Fejsal Mulić had left the club after requesting the termination of his contract.

=== February ===
On 1 February, 1860 announced the signing of Goran Šukalo from Greuther Fürth, on a contract until the summer of 2017, and the singing of Maximilian Beister on loan from Mainz 05 for the rest of the season.

=== April/May ===
Daniel Bierofka took over for Möhlmann as head coach on 19 April 2016.

== Squad ==
As of match played 15 May 2016

No.	Name	Nationality	Position	Date of birth (age)	Signed from	Signed in	Contract ends	Apps.	Goals
Goalkeepers
1	Vitus Eicher	(Germany)	GK	5 November 1990 (aged 25)	Academy	2010		35	0
22	Michael Netolitzky	(Germany)	GK	12 January 1994 (aged 22)	Academy	2012		0	0
24	Stefan Ortega	(Germany)	GK	6 November 1992 (aged 23)	Arminia Bielefeld	2014		40	0
Defenders
2	Jan Mauersberger	(Germany)	DF	17 June 1985 (aged 30)	Karlsruher SC	2016	2018	14	2
3	Maximilian Wittek	(Germany)	DF	21 August 1995 (aged 20)	Academy	2014		52	1
4	Kai Bülow	(Germany)	DF	31 May 1986 (aged 29)	Hansa Rostock	2010		164	13
8	Rodnei	(Brazil)	DF	11 September 1985 (aged 30)	Red Bull Salzburg	2015	2017	5	0
17	Jannik Bandowski	(Germany)	DF	30 March 1994 (aged 22)	on loan from Borussia Dortmund	2015	2016	17	2
25	Gary Kagelmacher	(Uruguay)	DF	21 April 1988 (aged 28)	AS Monaco	2014		64	3
26	Christopher Schindler	(Germany)	DF	29 April 1990 (aged 26)	Academy	2010		166	4
30	Miloš Degenek	(Australia)	DF	28 April 1994 (aged 22)	VfB Stuttgart II	2015		28	1
37	Sertan Yiğenoğlu	(Germany)	DF	4 January 1995 (aged 21)	Hennef 05	2015		17	0
39	Vladimír Kováč	(Slovakia)	DF	29 April 1991 (aged 25)	BCF Wolfratshausen	2013			
Midfielders
6	Dominik Stahl	(Germany)	MF	20 August 1988 (aged 27)	Academy	2009		131	10
7	Daylon Claasen	(South Africa)	MF	28 January 1990 (aged 26)	Lech Poznań	2014			
10	Michael Liendl	(Austria)	MF	25 October 1985 (aged 30)	Fortuna Düsseldorf	2015			
11	Daniel Adlung	(Germany)	MF	1 October 1987 (aged 28)	Energie Cottbus	2013			
31	Richard Neudecker	(Germany)	MF	29 October 1996 (aged 19)	Academy	2014		8	0
33	Levent Ayçiçek	(Germany)	MF	14 February 1994 (aged 22)	on loan from Werder Bremen	2016	2016	14	1
38	Romuald Lacazette	(France)	MF	3 January 1994 (aged 22)	Paris Saint-Germain	2015	2017	9	0
	Goran Šukalo	(Slovenia)	MF	24 August 1981 (aged 34)	Greuther Fürth	2016	2017	0	0
Forwards
9	Stefan Mugoša	(Montenegro)	FW	26 February 1992 (aged 24)	FC Kaiserslautern	2015	2018	22	1
13	Sascha Mölders	(Germany)	FW	20 March 1985 (aged 31)	on loan from Augsburg	2016	2016	15	4
14	Krisztián Simon	(Hungary)	FW	10 June 1991 (aged 24)	Újpest	2015		13	1
16	Stephan Hain	(Germany)	FW	27 September 1988 (aged 27)	Augsburg	2013			
18	Nico Karger	(Germany)	FW	1 February 1993 (aged 23)	Academy	2015		14	0
19	Rubin Okotie	(Austria)	FW	6 June 1987 (aged 28)	Austria Wien	2014		62	25
20	Valdet Rama	(Albania)	FW	20 November 1987 (aged 28)	Real Valladolid	2014		45	5
23	Maximilian Beister	(Germany)	FW	6 September 1990 (aged 25)	on loan from Mainz 05	2016	2016	8	0
Out on loan
	Rodri	(Spain)	MF	6 June 1990 (aged 25)	Barcelona	2014	2017	6	1
Left during the season
27	Marius Wolf	(Germany)	FW	27 May 1995 (aged 20)	Academy	2014		44	5
33	Korbinian Vollmann	(Germany)	MF	27 October 1993 (aged 22)	Academy	2012		36	2
34	Fejsal Mulić	(Serbia)	FW	3 October 1994 (aged 21)	Novi Pazar	2014		14	0
35	Emanuel Taffertshofer	(Germany)	MF	24 February 1995 (aged 21)	Academy	2015		2	0
36	Stephané Mvibudulu	(Germany)	FW	18 May 1993 (aged 22)	Hallescher	2013		11	0

== Transfers ==
=== In ===
Date	Position	Nationality	Name	From	Fee	Ref.
13 July 2015	DF	(Brazil)	Rodnei	Red Bull Salzburg	Undisclosed	
18 July 2015	MF	(France)	Romuald Lacazette	Paris Saint-Germain	Undisclosed	
15 August 2015	FW	(Montenegro)	Stefan Mugoša	FC Kaiserslautern	Undisclosed	
18 January 2016	DF	(Germany)	Jan Mauersberger	Karlsruher SC	Undisclosed	
1 February 2016	MF	(Slovenia)	Goran Šukalo	Greuther Fürth	Undisclosed	

=== Loans in ===
Start date	Position	Nationality	Name	From	End date	Ref.
1 February 2016	FW	(Germany)	Maximilian Beister	Mainz 05	30 June 2026	

=== Out ===
Date	Position	Nationality	Name	To	Fee	Ref.
13 January 2026	FW	(Germany)	Stephané Mvibudulu	Stuttgarter Kickers	Undisclosed	
22 June 2016	DF	(Uruguay)	Gary Kagelmacher	Maccabi Haifa	Undisclosed	
29 June 2016	DF	(Germany)	Christopher Schindler	Huddersfield Town	Undisclosed	

=== Loans out ===
Start date	Position	Nationality	Name	To	End date	Ref.
4 August 2016	MF	(Spain)	Rodri	Real Valladolid	30 June 2016	

=== Released ===
Date	Position	Nationality	Name	Joined	Date	Ref
19 January 2016	FW	(Serbia)	Fejsal Mulić	Mouscron		
30 June 2016	GK	(Germany)	Michael Netolitzky	Hallescher		
30 June 2016	DF	(Slovakia)	Vladimír Kováč	Wehen Wiesbaden	1 July 2016	
30 June 2016	MF	(Germany)	Dominik Stahl	SpVgg Unterhaching	7 July 2016	
30 June 2016	MF	(Germany)	Richard Neudecker	St. Pauli		
30 June 2016	FW	(Albania)	Valdet Rama	Würzburger Kickers		
30 June 2016	FW	(Austria)	Rubin Okotie	Beijing Enterprises Group	13 July 2016	
30 June 2016	FW	(Germany)	Stephan Hain	SpVgg Unterhaching	28 July 2016	

== Friendlies ==
9 July 2015	Ufa	1–2	1860 Munich	Kirchbichl, Austria
CEST (UTC+2)	Marcinho 3' (yellow card); Paurević (yellow card)	Report	Okotie 19'; Mulić 63'	Stadium: SVK Arena; Attendance: 350; Referee: Christoph Hofer

== Competitions ==
=== Overall record ===
Competition	First match	Last match	Starting round	Final position	Record							
Competition	First match	Last match	Starting round	Final position	Pld	W	D	L	GF	GA	GD	Win %
2. Bundesliga	1 August 2025	15 May 2016	Matchday 1	15th	34	8	10	16	32	46	−14	23.53
DFB-Pokal	8 August 2015	16 December 2015	First Round	Round of 16	3	2	0	1	4	3	+1	66.67
Total					37	10	10	17	36	49	−13	27.03

Last updated: 15 May 2016
Source: Competitions

=== 2. Bundesliga ===
==== League table ====
Pos	Team	Pld	W	D	L	GF	GA	GD	Pts	Promotion, qualification or relegation
13	SV Sandhausen	34	12	7	15	40	50	−10	40 (Note: SV Sandhausen were deducted three points for license violation.)	
14	Fortuna Düsseldorf	34	9	8	17	32	47	−15	35	
15	1860 Munich	34	8	10	16	32	46	−14	34	
16	MSV Duisburg (R)	34	7	11	16	32	54	−22	32	Qualification for relegation play-offs
17	FSV Frankfurt (R)	34	8	8	18	33	59	−26	32	Relegation to 3. Liga

Source: DFB
Rules for classification: 1) Points; 2) Goal difference; 3) Goals scored
(R) Relegated

==== Results summary ====
Overall								Home						Away					
Pld	W	D	L	GF	GA	GD	Pts	W	D	L	GF	GA	GD	W	D	L	GF	GA	GD
34	8	10	16	32	46	−14	34	6	5	6	17	17	0	2	5	10	15	29	−14

Last updated: 15 May 2016.

==== Results by round ====
Round	1	2	3	4	5	6	7	8	9	10	11	12	13	14	15	16	17	18	19	20	21	22	23	24	25	26	27	28	29	30	31	32	33	34
Ground	A	H	A	H	A	A	H	A	H	A	H	A	H	A	H	A	H	H	A	H	A	H	H	A	H	A	H	A	H	A	H	A	H	A
Result	L	L	D	D	L	L	D	D	D	D	L	L	W	D	W	D	L	L	L	L	L	D	W	W	W	L	D	L	L	L	W	W	W	L
Position	12	17	14	16	16	17	17	17	17	17	17	17	17	17	16	17	17	17	17	17	17	17	16	16	15	15	16	16	16	17	16	14	14	15
Points	0	0	1	2	2	2	3	4	5	6	6	6	9	10	13	14	14	14	14	14	14	15	18	21	24	24	25	25	25	25	28	31	34	34

Updated to match(es) played on 15 May 2016. Source:
A = Away; H = Home; W = Win; D = Draw; L = Loss

==== Results ====
27 July 2015 1	FC Heidenheim	1–0	1860 Munich	Heidenheim an der Brenz
15:30 CEST (UTC+2)	Wittek (yellow card) 61'; Kraus 86'	Report	Degenek (yellow card) 25'; Simon (yellow card) 41'; Okotie (yellow card) 56'; Rama (yellow card) 59'; Kováč (yellow card) 87'; Vollmann (yellow card) 88'	Stadium: Voith-Arena; Attendance: 14,500; Referee: Christian Dingert

1 August 2015 2	1860 Munich	0–1	SC Freiburg	Munich
15:30 CEST (UTC+2)	Bülow (yellow card) 37'; Hain (yellow card) 74'	Report	Mujdža (yellow card) 56'; Petersen 75'; Abrashi (yellow card) 87'	Stadium: Allianz Arena; Attendance: 23,800; Referee: Guido Winkmann

17 August 2015 3	FC Nürnberg	2–2	1860 Munich	Nuremberg
20:15 CEST (UTC+2)	Polák (yellow card) 50'; Burgstaller 54'; Stark 63'; Blum (yellow card) 73'; Bulthuis (yellow card) 78'	Report	Bülow 45+1'; Adlung 74'	Stadium: Max-Morlock-Stadion; Attendance: 36,547; Referee: Robert Kampka

23 August 2015 4	1860 Munich	0–0	Union Berlin	Munich
13:30 CEST (UTC+2)	Okotie (yellow card) 47'; Mugoša (yellow card) 53'; Schindler (yellow card) 66'	Report	Brandy (yellow card) 17'; Schönheim (yellow card) 58'; Kessel (red card) 63'; Parensen (yellow card) 90+3'	Stadium: Allianz Arena; Attendance: 20,300; Referee: Thorsten Schriever

31 August 2015 5	VfL Bochum	1–0	1860 Munich	Bochum
20:15 CEST (UTC+2)	Losilla (yellow card) 23'; Terodde 48'; Bastians (yellow card) 68'	Report	Adlung (yellow card) 80'; Okotie (yellow card) 86'	Stadium: Ruhrstadion; Attendance: 20,776; Referee: Frank Willenborg

13 September 2015 6	Fortuna Düsseldorf	3–0	1860 Munich	Düsseldorf
13:30 CEST (UTC+2)	Bebou 9'; Ya Konan 30', 66'; Haggui (yellow card) 52'	Report	Wittek (yellow card) 32'; Claasen (yellow card) 42'; Degenek (yellow card) 63'; Wolf (yellow card) 70'	Stadium: Merkur Spiel-Arena; Attendance: 24,970; Referee: Manuel Gräfe

19 September 2015 7	1860 Munich	1–1	FC Kaiserslautern	Munich
13:00 CEST (UTC+2)	Degenek 15'; Claasen (yellow card) 36'; Adlung (yellow card) 62'; Degenek (yellow card) 89'	Report	Jenssen 59' (yellow card) 76'; Zimmer (yellow card) 68'	Stadium: Allianz Arena; Attendance: 23,500; Referee: Florian Meyer

22 September 2015 8	SV Sandhausen	1–1	1860 Munich	Sandhausen
17:30 CEST (UTC+2)	Jovanović 38' (yellow card) 52'; Klingmann (yellow card) 45'; Paqarada (yellow card) 49'; Zillner (yellow card) 60'	Report	Degenek (yellow card) 2'; Vollmann 39'; Rodnei (yellow card) 52'	Stadium: Hardtwaldstadion; Attendance: 4,664; Referee: Timo Gerach

27 September 2015 9	1860 Munich	2–2	RB Leipzig	Munich
13:30 CEST (UTC+2)	Wolf 8'; Wittek (yellow card) 63'; Okotie 78'	Report	Forsberg 6'; Selke 67'	Stadium: Allianz Arena; Attendance: 21,600; Referee: Sven Jablonski

2 October 2015 10	Arminia Bielefeld	1–1	1860 Munich	Bielefeld
18:30 CEST (UTC+2)	Klos 40'; Junglas (yellow card) 55'; Behrendt (yellow card) 65'	Report	Wolf 8'; Degenek (yellow card) 64'; Rodnei (yellow card) 90+1'	Stadium: Bielefelder Alm; Attendance: 16,787; Referee: Martin Petersen

19 October 2015 11	1860 Munich	0–1	Karlsruher SC	Munich
20:15 CEST (UTC+2)	Kagelmacher (yellow card) 20'; Liendl (yellow card) 26'; Wolf (yellow card) 70'; Wittek (yellow card) 76'	Report	Hoffer 33'; Stoll (yellow card) 52'; Orlishausen (yellow card) 71'; Prömel (yellow card) 76'; Barry (yellow card) 82'	Stadium: Allianz Arena; Attendance: 19,800; Referee: Daniel Siebert

23 October 2015 12	Greuther Fürth	1–0	1860 Munich	Fürth
18:30 CEST (UTC+2)	Berisha (yellow card) 37'; Stiepermann 47'; Freis (yellow card) 61'; Šukalo (yellow card) 68'; Hofmann (yellow card) 90+4'	Report	Degenek (yellow card) 4'; Yiğenoğlu (yellow card) 85'; Adlung (yellow card) 90+1'	Stadium: Sportpark Ronhof Thomas Sommer; Attendance: 12,530; Referee: Marco Fritz

1 November 2015 13	1860 Munich	1–0	MSV Duisburg	Munich
13:30 CET (UTC+1)	Neudecker (yellow card) 27'; Wolf 90+1'	Report	Holland (yellow card) 8'; Grote (yellow card) 72'	Stadium: Allianz Arena; Attendance: 17,100; Referee: Bibiana Steinhaus

8 November 2015 14	Eintracht Braunschweig	0–0	1860 Munich	Paderborn
13:30 CET (UTC+1)	Baffoe (yellow card) 79'; Holtmann (yellow card) 85'	Report	Neudecker (yellow card) 11'; Wittek (yellow card) 82'	Stadium: Benteler-Arena; Attendance: 21,435; Referee: Thorben Siewer

21 November 2015 15	1860 Munich	2–0	St. Pauli	Munich
13:00 CET (UTC+1)	Liendl 53'; Okotie 56'; Kagelmacher (yellow card) 83'	Report	Sobota (yellow card) 59'	Stadium: Allianz Arena; Attendance: 30,100; Referee: Jochen Drees

28 November 2015 16	SC Paderborn	4–4	1860 Munich	Paderborn
13:00 CET (UTC+1)	Stoppelkamp 17'; Wahl 50'; Sağlık 60'; Bertels (yellow card) 83'; Brückner (yellow card) 84'; Proschwitz 90'	Report	Adlung (yellow card) 36'; Neudecker (yellow card) 51' (yellow-red card) 59'; Kagelmacher 57'; Okotie 62', 73', 88'; Degenek (yellow card) 67'; Mulić (yellow card) 84'	Stadium: Benteler-Arena; Attendance: 10,225; Referee: Patrick Alt

4 December 2015 17	1860 Munich	0–1	FSV Frankfurt	Munich
18:30 CET (UTC+1)	Yiğenoğlu (yellow card) 36'; Liendl (yellow card) 56'; Degenek (yellow card) 89'	Report	Schahin 37'; Barry (yellow card) 56'	Stadium: Allianz Arena; Attendance: 14,100; Referee: Robert Kempter

11 December 2015 18	1860 Munich	1–3	FC Heidenheim	Munich
18:30 CET (UTC+1)	Okotie 45+2'; Kagelmacher (yellow card) 66'	Report	Halloran 6'; Philp (yellow card) 24'; Leipertz 54'; Schnatterer (yellow card) 66'; Morabit 83'	Stadium: Allianz Arena; Attendance: 14,300; Referee: Robert Schröder

20 December 2015 19	SC Freiburg	3–0	1860 Munich	Freiburg im Breisgau
15:30 CET (UTC+1)	Philipp 34'; Föhrenbach 44'; Grifo 65' (yellow card) 76'	Report	Mugoša (yellow card) 28'; Lacazette (yellow card) 47'; Schindler (yellow card) 66'; Hain (yellow card) 83'	Stadium: Dreisamstadion; Attendance: 24,000; Referee: Tobias Stieler

6 February 2016 20	1860 Munich	0–1	FC Nürnberg	Munich
13:00 CET (UTC+1)	Schindler (yellow card) 77'; Kagelmacher (yellow card) 87'; Beister (yellow card) 90+4'	Report	Erras 23'; Burgstaller (yellow card) 80'	Stadium: Allianz Arena; Attendance: 51,200; Referee: Thorsten Schriever

14 February 2016 21	Union Berlin	3–0	1860 Munich	Berlin
13:30 CET (UTC+1)	Kroos 6'; Parensen (yellow card) 64'; Wood 80'; Kreilach 88'	Report	Wittek (yellow card) 70'; Ayçiçek (yellow card) 76'	Stadium: Stadion An der Alten Försterei; Attendance: 18,332; Referee: Guido Winkmann

21 February 2016 22	1860 Munich	1–1	VfL Bochum	Munich
13:30 CET (UTC+1)	Okotie 36'; Yiğenoğlu (yellow card) 45+1'; Stahl (yellow card) 62'	Report	Terrazzino 44'; Haberer (yellow card) 60'; Losilla (yellow card) 69'	Stadium: Allianz Arena; Attendance: 15,300; Referee: Markus Schmidt

27 February 2016 23	1860 Munich	3–2	Fortuna Düsseldorf	Munich
13:00 CET (UTC+1)	Bülow 29'; Mölders 47'; Liendl 80'; Beister (yellow card) 83'	Report	Schmitz 66'; Bebou 76'; Pohjanpalo (yellow card) 80'; Strohdiek (yellow card) 89'	Stadium: Allianz Arena; Attendance: 17,700; Referee: Patrick Ittrich

1 March 2016 24	FC Kaiserslautern	0–1	1860 Munich	Kaiserslautern
17:30 CET (UTC+1)		Report	Bülow 18'; Lacazette (yellow card) 68'; Wittek (yellow card) 89'	Stadium: Fritz-Walter-Stadion; Attendance: 23,547; Referee: Robert Schröder

4 March 2016 25	1860 Munich	3–2	SV Sandhausen	Munich
18:30 CET (UTC+1)	Schindler 10'; Mölders 30'; Liendl 61' (pen.)	Report	Bouhaddouz 12'; Thiede (yellow card) 42'; Roßbach (yellow card) 64'; Jovanović 72'; Wooten (yellow card) 74'; Hübner (yellow card) 77'	Stadium: Allianz Arena; Attendance: 14,600; Referee: René Rohde

13 March 2016 26	RB Leipzig	2–1	1860 Munich	Leipzig
13:30 CET (UTC+1)	Nukan (yellow card) 13'; Demme (yellow card) 41'; Selke 64'; Klostermann 77'; Khedira (yellow card) 83'; Jung (yellow card) 90+3'	Report	Mauersberger (yellow card) 43'; Mölders 50'; Degenek (yellow card) 53'; Wittek (yellow card) 64'	Stadium: Red Bull Arena; Attendance: 25,551; Referee: Robert Kampka

20 March 2016 27	1860 Munich	1–1	Arminia Bielefeld	Munich
13:30 CET (UTC+1)	Wittek (yellow card) 18'; Mauersberger 19'; Lacazette (yellow card) 37' (yellow-red card) 88'; Degenek (yellow card) 64'; Rama (yellow card) 80'	Report	Görlitz 55'; Hemlein (yellow card) 81'; Salger (yellow card) 90+2'	Stadium: Allianz Arena; Attendance: 20,500; Referee: Sven Jablonski

3 April 2016 28	Karlsruher SC	3–1	1860 Munich	Karlsruhe
13:30 CEST (UTC+2)	Diamantakos 34'; Gulde 38'; Valentini 41'; Thoelke (yellow card) 65'	Report	Mölders 14'; Schindler (yellow card) 40'; Wittek (yellow card) 67'	Stadium: Wildparkstadion; Attendance: 16,952; Referee: Michael Weiner

8 April 2016 29	1860 Munich	0–1	Greuther Fürth	Munich
18:30 CEST (UTC+2)	Kagelmacher (yellow card) 83'; Ortega (yellow card) 90+3'	Report	Žulj 2' (yellow card) 85'; Stiepermann (yellow card) 43'; Rodríguez (yellow card) 88'	Stadium: Allianz Arena; Attendance: 18,300; Referee: Marco Fritz

15 April 2016 30	MSV Duisburg	2–1	1860 Munich	Duisburg
18:30 CEST (UTC+2)	Bröker 73'; Obinna 85'; Ratajczak (yellow card) 90+3'	Report	Liendl 64'; Bülow (yellow card) 77'; Degenek (yellow card) 55' (yellow-red card) 80'; Mauersberger (yellow card) 87'	Stadium: MSV-Arena; Attendance: 22,482; Referee: Thorben Siewer

24 April 2016 31	1860 Munich	1–0	Eintracht Braunschweig	Munich
13:30 CEST (UTC+2)	Okotie (yellow card) 75' (goal) 87'	Report		Stadium: Allianz Arena; Attendance: 20,800; Referee: Tobias Welz

29 April 2016 32	St. Pauli	0–2	1860 Munich	Hamburg
18:30 CEST (UTC+2)	Buchtmann (yellow card) 36'; Buballa (yellow card) 90'	Report	Claasen 8'; Mölders (yellow card) 30'; Wittek (yellow card) 36'; Ayçiçek 88'	Stadium: Millerntor-Stadion; Attendance: 29,546; Referee: Knut Kircher

8 May 2016 33	1860 Munich	1–0	SC Paderborn	Munich
15:30 CEST (UTC+2)	Mauersberger (yellow card) 51' (goal) 73'; Ayçiçek (yellow card) 87'	Report	Sebastian (yellow card) 40'; Schonlau (yellow card) 56'	Stadium: Allianz Arena; Attendance: 54,100; Referee: Tobias Stieler

15 May 2016 34	FSV Frankfurt	2–1	1860 Munich	Frankfurt
15:30 CEST (UTC+2)	Hajsafi (yellow card) 31'; Kapllani 56', 88'; Engels (yellow card) 62'; Konrad (yellow card) 86'	Report	Rama 48'; Wittek (yellow card) 73' (yellow-red card) 81'; Kagelmacher (yellow card) 86'	Stadium: PSD Bank Arena; Attendance: 12,542; Referee: Felix Zwayer

=== DFB-Pokal ===
8 August 2015 First round	1860 Munich	2–0	TSG Hoffenheim	Munich
18:00 CEST (UTC+2)	Degenek (yellow card) 48'; Claasen 51'; Mulić 90+3' (yellow card) 90+3'	Report	Toljan (yellow card) 37'; Volland (yellow card) 50'	Stadium: Allianz Arena; Attendance: 17,800; Referee: Harm Osmers

27 October 2015 Second round	Mainz 05	1–2	1860 Munich	Mainz
19:00 CET (UTC+1)	Schindler 6' (o.g.); Niederlechner (yellow card) 25'; Bengtsson (red card) 45'	Report	Yiğenoğlu (yellow card) 51'; Neudecker (yellow card) 61'; Degenek (yellow card) 68'; Mugoša 70'; Okotie 77'; Kagelmacher (yellow card) 87'	Stadium: Mewa Arena; Attendance: 17,617; Referee: Harm Osmers

16 December 2015 Round of 16	1860 Munich	0–2	VfL Bochum	Munich
20:30 CET (UTC+1)	Degenek (yellow card) 57'; Wolf (yellow card) 80'; Wittek (yellow card) 88'	Report	Haberer 39' (yellow card) 62'; Hoogland 44'	Stadium: Allianz Arena; Attendance: 19,800; Referee: Marco Fritz

== Squad statistics ==
As of match played 15 May 2016

=== Appearances and goals ===
Players with no appearances are not included on the list
Italics indicate a loaned in player

No.	Pos	Nat	Player	Total		2. Bundesliga		DFB-Pokal	
No.	Pos	Nat	Player	Apps	Goals	Apps	Goals	Apps	Goals
1	GK	(Germany) GER	Vitus Eicher	19	0	19	0	0	0
2	DF	(Germany) GER	Jan Mauersberger	14	2	14	2	0	0
3	DF	(Germany) GER	Maximilian Wittek	30	0	26+1	0	2+1	0
4	DF	(Germany) GER	Kai Bülow	23	3	21+1	3	1	0
6	MF	(Germany) GER	Dominik Stahl	4	0	3+1	0	0	0
7	MF	(South Africa) RSA	Daylon Claasen	25	2	19+3	1	3	1
8	DF	(Brazil) BRA	Rodnei	5	0	3+2	0	0	0
9	FW	(Montenegro) MNE	Stefan Mugoša	22	1	6+14	0	2	1
10	MF	(Austria) AUT	Michael Liendl	31	4	26+3	4	1+1	0
11	MF	(Germany) GER	Daniel Adlung	31	1	27+1	1	3	0
13	FW	(Germany) GER	Sascha Mölders	15	4	13+2	4	0	0
14	FW	(Hungary) HUN	Krisztián Simon	4	0	2+1	0	1	0
16	FW	(Germany) GER	Stephan Hain	6	0	3+2	0	1	0
17	DF	(Germany) GER	Jannik Bandowski	1	0	1	0	0	0
18	FW	(Germany) GER	Nico Karger	8	0	0+7	0	0+1	0
19	FW	(Austria) AUT	Rubin Okotie	35	9	24+8	8	2+1	1
20	FW	(Albania) ALB	Valdet Rama	20	1	12+8	1	0	0
23	FW	(Germany) GER	Maximilian Beister	8	0	1+7	0	0	0
24	GK	(Germany) GER	Stefan Ortega	18	0	15	0	3	0
25	DF	(Uruguay) URU	Gary Kagelmacher	35	1	32	1	3	0
26	DF	(Germany) GER	Christopher Schindler	36	1	33	1	3	0
30	DF	(Australia) AUS	Miloš Degenek	28	1	20+5	1	3	0
31	MF	(Germany) GER	Richard Neudecker	8	0	4+2	0	2	0
33	MF	(Germany) GER	Levent Ayçiçek	14	1	11+3	1	0	0
37	DF	(Germany) GER	Sertan Yiğenoğlu	17	0	12+3	0	2	0
38	MF	(France) FRA	Romuald Lacazette	9	0	9	0	0	0
39	DF	(Slovakia) SVK	Vladimír Kováč	1	0	1	0	0	0
Players away on loan:
Players who featured but departed the club permanently during the season:
27	FW	(Germany) GER	Marius Wolf	18	3	11+5	3	1+1	0
33	MF	(Germany) GER	Korbinian Vollmann	16	1	6+9	1	0+1	0
34	FW	(Serbia) SRB	Fejsal Mulić	8	1	2+5	0	0+1	1
35	MF	(Germany) GER	Emanuel Taffertshofer	2	0	2	0	0	0
36	FW	(Germany) GER	Stephané Mvibudulu	11	0	2+7	0	0+2	0

=== Goal scorers ===
Place	Position	Nation	Number	Name	2. Bundesliga	DFB-Pokal	Total
1	FW	(Austria)	19	Rubin Okotie	8	1	9
2	FW	(Germany)	13	Sascha Mölders	4	0	4
2	MF	(Austria)	10	Michael Liendl	4	0	4
4	FW	(Germany)	27	Marius Wolf	3	0	3
4	DF	(Germany)	4	Kai Bülow	3	0	3
6	DF	(Germany)	2	Jan Mauersberger	2	0	2
6	MF	(South Africa)	7	Daylon Claasen	1	1	2
8	MF	(Germany)	11	Daniel Adlung	1	0	1
8	DF	(Australia)	30	Miloš Degenek	1	0	1
8	MF	(Germany)	33	Korbinian Vollmann	1	0	1
8	DF	(Uruguay)	25	Gary Kagelmacher	1	0	1
8	DF	(Germany)	26	Christopher Schindler	1	0	1
8	MF	(Germany)	33	Levent Ayçiçek	1	0	1
8	MF	(Albania)	20	Valdet Rama	1	0	1
8	FW	(Serbia)	34	Fejsal Mulić	0	1	1
8	FW	(Montenegro)	9	Stefan Mugoša	0	1	1
Total					32	4	36

=== Clean sheets ===
Place	Position	Nation	Number	Name	2. Bundesliga	DFB-Pokal	Total
1	GK	(Germany)	24	Stefan Ortega	4	1	5
2	GK	(Germany)	1	Vitus Eicher	4	0	4
Total					8	1	9

=== Disciplinary record ===
As of match played 9 May 2026

Number	Nation	Position	Name	2. Bundesliga		DFB-Pokal		Total	
Number	Nation	Position	Name	Booked	Sent off (straight red)	Booked	Sent off (straight red)	Booked	Sent off (straight red)
2	(Germany)	DF	Jan Mauersberger	2	0	0	0	2	0
3	(Germany)	DF	Maximilian Wittek	12	1	1	0	13	1
4	(Germany)	DF	Kai Bülow	2	0	0	0	2	0
6	(Germany)	MF	Dominik Stahl	2	0	0	0	2	0
7	(South Africa)	MF	Daylon Claasen	3	0	0	0	3	0
8	(Brazil)	DF	Rodnei	2	0	0	0	2	0
9	(Montenegro)	FW	Stefan Mugoša	2	0	0	0	2	0
10	(Austria)	MF	Michael Liendl	2	0	0	0	2	0
11	(Germany)	MF	Daniel Adlung	3	0	0	0	3	0
13	(Germany)	FW	Sascha Mölders	1	0	0	0	1	0
14	(Hungary)	FW	Krisztián Simon	1	0	0	0	1	0
16	(Germany)	FW	Stephan Hain	2	0	0	0	2	0
19	(Austria)	FW	Rubin Okotie	4	0	0	0	4	0
20	(Albania)	MF	Valdet Rama	2	0	0	0	2	0
23	(Germany)	FW	Maximilian Beister	2	0	0	0	2	0
24	(Germany)	GK	Stefan Ortega	1	0	0	0	1	0
25	(Uruguay)	DF	Gary Kagelmacher	6	0	1	0	7	0
26	(Germany)	DF	Christopher Schindler	4	0	0	0	4	0
30	(Australia)	DF	Miloš Degenek	12	1	3	0	15	1
31	(Germany)	MF	Richard Neudecker	4	1	1	0	5	1
33	(Germany)	MF	Levent Ayçiçek	2	0	0	0	2	0
37	(Germany)	DF	Sertan Yiğenoğlu	3	0	1	0	4	0
38	(France)	MF	Romuald Lacazette	4	1	0	0	4	1
39	(Slovakia)	DF	Vladimír Kováč	1	0	0	0	1	0
Players away on loan:
Players who left 1860 Munich during the season:
27	(Germany)	FW	Marius Wolf	2	0	1	0	3	0
33	(Germany)	MF	Korbinian Vollmann	1	0	0	0	1	0
34	(Serbia)	FW	Fejsal Mulić	1	0	1	0	2	0
Total				83	4	9	0	92	4
