= 2013–14 TSV 1860 Munich season =

TSV 1860 Munich
2013–14 season
- Manager: Alexander Schmidt
- Stadium: Allianz Arena
- 2. Bundesliga: 7th
- DFB-Pokal: Second round (eliminated by 1. FC Heidenheim)

The 2013–14 TSV 1860 Munich season was the 108th season in the club's football history.

== Background ==
1860 München signed Daniel Adlung. Markus Ziereis left 1860 München.

=== Transfers ===
==== In ====
Pos.	Name	Age	Moving from	Type	Transfer Window	Contract ends	Transfer fee	Sources
MF	Daniel Adlung	25	Energie Cottbus	End of contract	Summer	2016	Free	

==== Out ====
Pos.	Name	Age	Moving to	Type	Transfer Window	Transfer fee	Sources
DF	Markus Ziereis	20	FSV Frankfurt	Transfer	Summer		

== 2. Bundesliga ==
=== 2. Bundesliga review ===
==== Matchdays 1–17 ====
1860 München started their season against FC St. Pauli on 19 July with a 1–0 loss. Lennart Thy scored for St. Pauli. 1860 München finished the matchday tied for 14th place with Energie Cottbus, FSV Frankfurt, and Paderborn 07. Then 1860 München finished July against FSV Frankfurt on matchday two on 28 July. 1860 München won 2–1. Benjamin Lauth and Moritz Stoppelkamp scored for 1860 München and Mathew Leckie scored for Frankfurt. 1860 München finished the matchday in ninth place.

=== 2. Bundesliga fixtures and results ===
==== Legend ====
Win Draw Loss Postponed

==== 2. Bundesliga fixtures and results ====
MD	Date^{1}	Stadium	Opponent	Result^{2}	Attendance	Goalscorers		League position	Ref.
MD	Date^{1}	Stadium	Opponent	Result^{2}	Attendance	1860 München	Opponent	League position	Ref.
1	19 July – 20:30	A	FC St. Pauli	0–1	27,818	—	Thy 80'	T14	
2	28 July – 13:30	H	FSV Frankfurt	2–1	16,500	Lauth 55'; Stoppelkamp 90+1'	Leckie 53'	9	
3	9 August – 18:30	A	Fortuna Düsseldorf	2–1	34,626	Lauth 9'; Tomasov 78'	Benschop 37' (pen.)	4	
4	18 August – 13:30	H	Ingolstadt 04	1–0	24,200	Roger 48' (o.g.)	—	3	
5	25 August – 13:30	A	Paderborn 07	0–1	7,411	—	Wemmer 71'	3	
6	30 August – 18:30	H	SV Sandhausen	0–2	15,100	—	Hübner 12'; Jovanović 39'	6	
7	13 September – 18:30	A	VfR Aalen	0–0	8,910	—	—	7	
8	21 September – 13:00	H	Erzgebirge Aue	3–1	14,300	Stoppelkamp 23' (pen.); Stark 27'; Friend 65'	Sylvestr 79'	5	
9	29 September – 13:30	A	1. FC Kaiserslautern	0–3	31,637	—	Gaus 51'; Zoller 72'; Idrissou 82'	7	
10	6 October – 13:30	H	Energie Cottbus	0–0	16,100	—	—	8	
11	21 October – 20:15	A	1. FC Köln	0–0	48,300	—	—	9	
12	27 October – 13:30	A	Karlsruher SC	1–2	16,527	Stoppelkamp 85'	Alibaz 16'; Vallori 22' (o.g.)	11	
13	3 November – 13:30	H	Dynamo Dresden	1–3	23,500	Vallori 9'	Poté 2'; Dedić 10'; Aoudia 90+3'	14	
14	9 November – 13:00	A	Arminia Bielefeld	1–0	14,309	Stahl 57'	—	11	
15	25 November – 20:15	H	Greuther Fürth	1–0	15,500	Stahl 56'	—	8	
16	1 December – 13:30	A	VfL Bochum	2–1	17,479	Stahl 10'; Adlung 61'	Tasaka 35'	7	
17	7 December – 13:00	H	Union Berlin	2–1	18,400	Bülow 64'; Stahl 86'	Mattuschka 74' (pen.)	6	
18	16 December – 20:15	H	FC St. Pauli	0–2	23,700	—	Nöthe 43'; Bartels 81'	7	
19	21 December – 13:00	A	FSV Frankfurt	2–2	5,814	Stoppelkamp 38' (pen.), 90'	Leckie 21'; Yelen 70'	8	
20	10 February 2014 – 20:15	H	Fortuna Düsseldorf	1–1	20,100	Osako 63'	Halloran 70'		
21	14 February 2014 – 18:30	A	Ingolstadt 04	0–2	13,734	—	Hofmann 20'; Quaner 88'		
22	22 February 2014 – 13:00	H	Paderborn 07	2–2	13,800	Bierofka 81'; Osako 86'	Vrančić 5'; Meha 18'		
23	1 March 2014 – 13:00	A	SV Sandhausen	0–0	5,300	—	—		
24	7 March 2014 – 18:30	H	VfR Aalen	4–0	14,100	Stark 20'; Osako 21'; Ludwig 37'; Stoppelkamp 87'	—		
25	15 March 2014 – 13:00	A	Erzebirge Aue	2–2	8,750	Wojtkowiak 2'; Osako 90+2'	Jakob Sylvestr 49'; Benatelli 86'		
26	23 March 2014 – 13:30	H	1. FC Kaiserslautern	0–1	24,600	—	Gaus 55'		
27	26 March 2014 – 17:30	A	Energie Cottbus	1–2	10,021	Stahl 47'; Adlung 70'	Fetsch 25'		
28	30 March 2014 – 13:30	H	1. FC Köln	0–1	33,600	—	Finne 85'		
29	6 April 2014 – 13:30	H	Karlsruher SC	0–3	19,100	—	Hennings 19' (pen.) 32' 54'		
30	14 April 2014 – 20:15	A	Dynamo Dresden	4–2	27,344	Losilla 26' (o.g.); Adlung 89'	Kempe 5'; Ouali 11'; Koch 20' 44'		
31	19 April 2014 – 13:00	H	Arminia Bielefeld	2–1	15,100	Adlung 4'; Bülow 72'	Sahar 30'		
32	25 April 2014 – 18:30	A	Greuther Fürth	1–2	16,140	Osako 26'; Bülow 90+2'	Azemi 21'		
33	4 May 2014 – 15:30	H	VfL Bochum	2–0	20,600	Osako 31'; Lauth 90'	—		
34	11 May 2014 – 15:30	A	Union Berlin	1–1	21,717	Wojtkowiak 17'	Kohlmann 49'		

=== League table ===
Pos	Team	Pld	W	D	L	GF	GA	GD	Pts
5	Karlsruher SC	34	12	14	8	47	34	+13	50
6	Fortuna Düsseldorf	34	13	11	10	45	44	+1	50
7	1860 Munich	34	13	9	12	38	41	−3	48
8	FC St. Pauli	34	13	9	12	44	49	−5	48
9	Union Berlin	34	11	11	12	48	47	+1	44

Source: kicker.de
Rules for classification: 1) points; 2) goal difference; 3) number of goals scored.

== DFB–Pokal ==
=== DFB–Pokal review ===
The first round draw took place on 15 June. 1860 München were drawn against 1. FC Heidenheim. The match took place on 2 August. Regular time ended 1–1 and the match went into extra time. There was no scoring in either extra time period and went to kicks from the penalty mark where 1860 München won the shoot–out.

=== DFB–Pokal results ===
==== Legend ====
Win Draw Loss Postponed

==== DFB–Pokal results ====
Rd.	Date^{1}	Stadium	Opponent	Result^{2}	Attendance	Goalscorers		Ref.
Rd.	Date^{1}	Stadium	Opponent	Result^{2}	Attendance	1860 München	Opponent	Ref.
R1	2 August – 19:00	A	1. FC Heidenheim	1–1^{3}	10,000	Stoppelkamp 50'	Göhlert 90+1'	
R2	24 September – 19:00	H	Borussia Dortmund	0–2^{4}	71,000	–	Aubameyang 105' (pen.); Mkhitaryan 107'	

== Player information ==
=== Squad and statistics ===
==== Appearances and goals ====
As of 27 January 2014

No.	Pos	Nat	Player	Total		2. Bundesliga		DFB-Pokal	
No.	Pos	Nat	Player	Apps	Goals	Apps	Goals	Apps	Goals
1	GK	(Hungary) HUN	Gábor Király	21	0	19	0	2	0
2	DF	(Germany) GER	Moritz Volz	13	0	11	0	2	0
3	DF	(Poland) POL	Grzegorz Wojtkowiak	18	0	16	0	2	0
4	DF	(Germany) GER	Kai Bülow	21	1	19	1	2	0
5	DF	(Spain) ESP	Guillermo Vallori	19	1	19	1	0	0
6	MF	(Germany) GER	Dominik Stahl	15	4	13	4	2	0
7	MF	(Germany) GER	Daniel Bierofka	1	0	1	0	0	0
9	FW	(Japan) JPN	Yuya Osako	0	0	0	0	0	0
10	MF	(Germany) GER	Moritz Stoppelkamp	21	6	19	5	2	1
11	FW	(Germany) GER	Benjamin Lauth	21	2	19	2	2	0
14	MF	(Croatia) CRO	Marin Tomasov	13	1	12	1	1	0
16	MF	(Germany) GER	Stephan Hain	12	0	11	0	1	0
17	MF	(Germany) GER	Sebastian Hertner	13	0	12	0	1	0
18	FW	(Germany) GER	Andreas Neumeyer	0	0	0	0	0	0
19	MF	(Germany) GER	Daniel Adlung	21	1	19	1	2	0
20	MF	(Germany) GER	Stefan Wannenwetsch	8	0	7	0	1	0
21	MF	(Germany) GER	Markus Steinhöfer	0	0	0	0	0	0
22	GK	(Germany) GER	Michael Netolitzky	0	0	0	0	0	0
23	FW	(United States) USA	Bobby Wood	13	0	12	0	1	0
25	DF	(Germany) GER	Andreas Geipl	0	0	0	0	0	0
26	DF	(Germany) GER	Christopher Schindler	17	0	15	0	2	0
29	MF	(Germany) GER	Yannick Stark	20	1	18	1	2	0
30	GK	(Germany) GER	Vitus Eicher	0	0	0	0	0	0
33	MF	(Germany) GER	Korbinian Vollmann	0	0	0	0	0	0
35	DF	(Germany) GER	Markus Schwabl	0	0	0	0	0	0
36	DF	(Germany) GER	Phillipp Steinhart	0	0	0	0	0	0
Players who have left the club after the season started.
9	FW	(Canada) CAN	Rob Friend	12	1	10	1	2	0
27	DF	(Germany) GER	Arne Feick	0	0	0	0	0	0

== Notes ==
- 1.Kickoff time in Central European Time/Central European Summer Time.
- 2.1860 München goals listed first.
- 3.1860 München won 4–3 in a shoot–out.
- 4.The match finished at the end of extra time.
