= Vitus Eicher =

German footballer (born 1990)

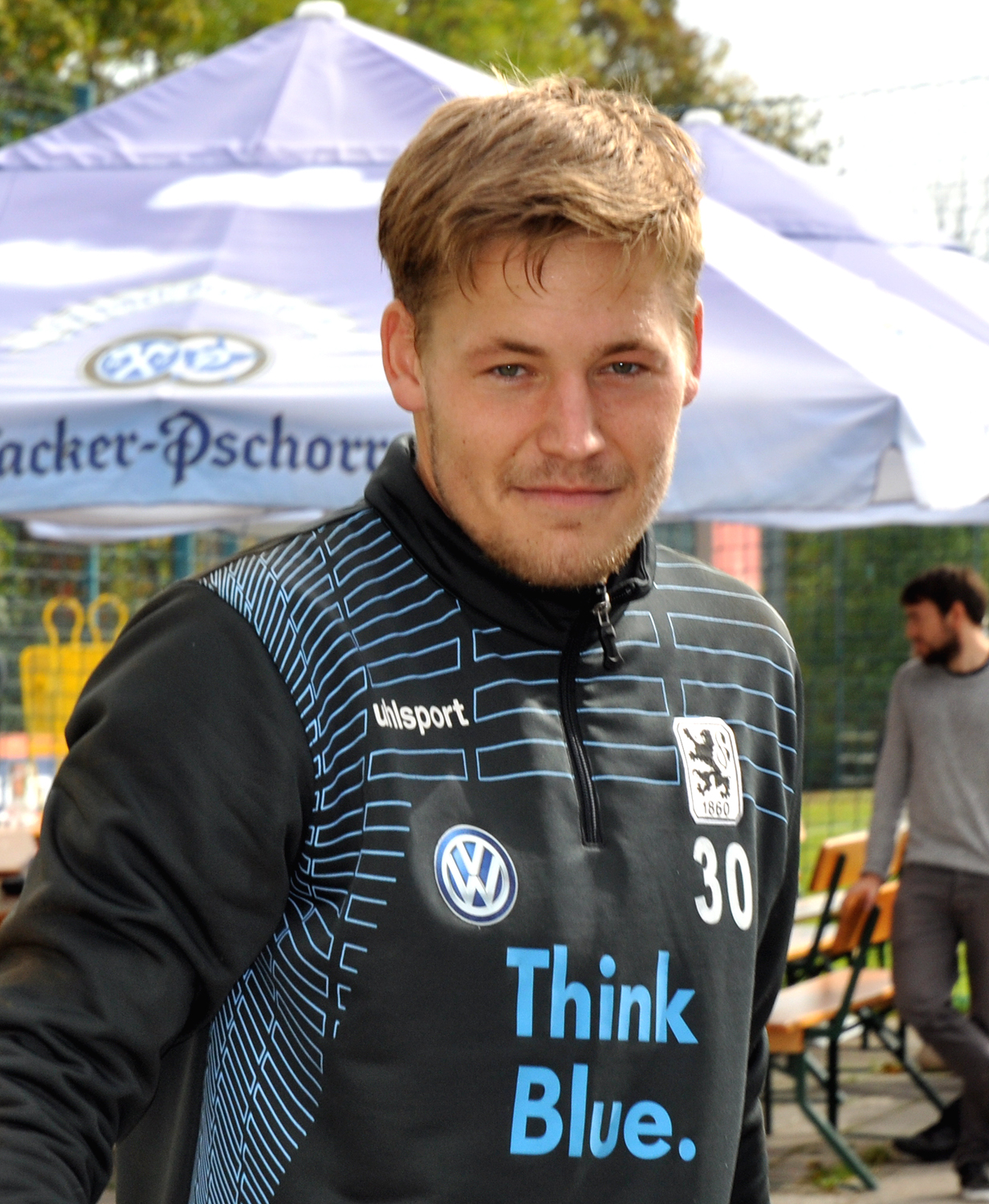
- Eicher with 1860 Munich in 2014

Personal information
- Date of birth: 5 November 1990 (age 35)
- Place of birth: Erding, Germany
- Height: 1.91 m (6 ft 3 in)
- Position: Goalkeeper

Team information
- Current team: 1860 Munich
- Number: 30

Youth career
- –2000: FC Langengeisling
- 2000–2009: 1860 Munich

Senior career*
Years	Team	Apps	(Gls)
2009–2017	1860 Munich II	118	(1)
2010–2017	1860 Munich	33	(0)
2017–2025	1. FC Heidenheim	6	(0)
2026–	1860 Munich	9	(0)
2026–	1860 Munich II	1	(0)
- * Club domestic league appearances and goals as of 27 September 2026

Vitus Eicher (born 5 November 1990) is a German professional footballer who plays as a goalkeeper for 1860 Munich.

== Career ==
On 23 April 2013, Eicher scored his first goal of his career in a Regionalliga Bayern game against TSV Buchbach. After a blocked free kick, Eicher corralled the ball and launched it 70 meters down the field in the 58th minute. After one bounce, the ball sailed over the opposing netminder's head giving Eicher the goal.

After the second match of the 2014–15 season, Eicher was suspended to the second squad along with his teammates Gábor Király, Daniel Adlung, Yannick Stark and captain Julian Weigl. While Király had assaulted Gary Kagelmacher during a match, the other four players had been out drinking late at night and were overheard talking negatively about the club.

Eicher was made the first-choice keeper of 1860 Munich in February 2015 after Torsten Fröhling became head coach of the team.

== Career statistics ==
As of match played 12 December 2024

Appearances and goals by club, season and competition
Club	Season	League			DFB-Pokal		Europe		Other		Total	
Club	Season	Division	Apps	Goals	Apps	Goals	Apps	Goals	Apps	Goals	Apps	Goals
1860 Munich II	2009–10	Regionalliga Süd	12	0	—		—		—		12	0
1860 Munich II	2010–11	Regionalliga Süd	20	0	—		—		—		20	0
1860 Munich II	2011–12	Regionalliga Süd	32	0	—		—		—		32	0
1860 Munich II	2012–13	Regionalliga Bayern	30	1	—		—		2 (Note: Appearance(s) in 3. Liga relegation play-offs)	0	32	1
1860 Munich II	2013–14	Regionalliga Bayern	10	0	—		—		—		10	0
1860 Munich II	2014–15	Regionalliga Bayern	8	0	—		—		—		8	0
1860 Munich II	2015–16	Regionalliga Bayern	0	0	—		—		—		0	0
1860 Munich II	2016–17	Regionalliga Bayern	4	0	—		—		—		4	0
1860 Munich II	Total		116	1	0	0	—		2	0	118	1
1860 Munich	2011–12	2. Bundesliga	1	0	—		—		—		1	0
1860 Munich	2012–13	2. Bundesliga	0	0	—		—		—		0	0
1860 Munich	2013–14	2. Bundesliga	0	0	—		—		—		0	0
1860 Munich	2014–15	2. Bundesliga	13	0	—		—		2 (Note: Appearance(s) in 2. Bundesliga relegation play-offs)	0	15	0
1860 Munich	2015–16	2. Bundesliga	19	0	—		—		—		19	0
1860 Munich	2016–17	2. Bundesliga	0	0	—		—		—		0	0
1860 Munich	Total		33	0	0	0	—		2	0	35	0
1. FC Heidenheim	2017–18	2. Bundesliga	3	0	0	0	—		—		3	0
1. FC Heidenheim	2018–19	2. Bundesliga	1	0	0	0	—		—		1	0
1. FC Heidenheim	2019–20	2. Bundesliga	1	0	1	0	—		0	0	2	0
1. FC Heidenheim	2020–21	2. Bundesliga	0	0	1	0	—		—		1	0
1. FC Heidenheim	2021–22	2. Bundesliga	0	0	0	0	—		—		0	0
1. FC Heidenheim	2022–23	2. Bundesliga	0	0	2	0	—		—		2	0
1. FC Heidenheim	2023–24	Bundesliga	0	0	1	0	—		—		1	0
1. FC Heidenheim	2024–25	Bundesliga	0	0	0	0	1 (Note: Appearance in UEFA Conference League)	0	0	0	1	0
1. FC Heidenheim	Total		5	0	5	0	1	0	0	0	11	0
Career total			154	1	5	0	5	0	0	0	164	1
