= Dominik Stahl =

German footballer (born 1988)

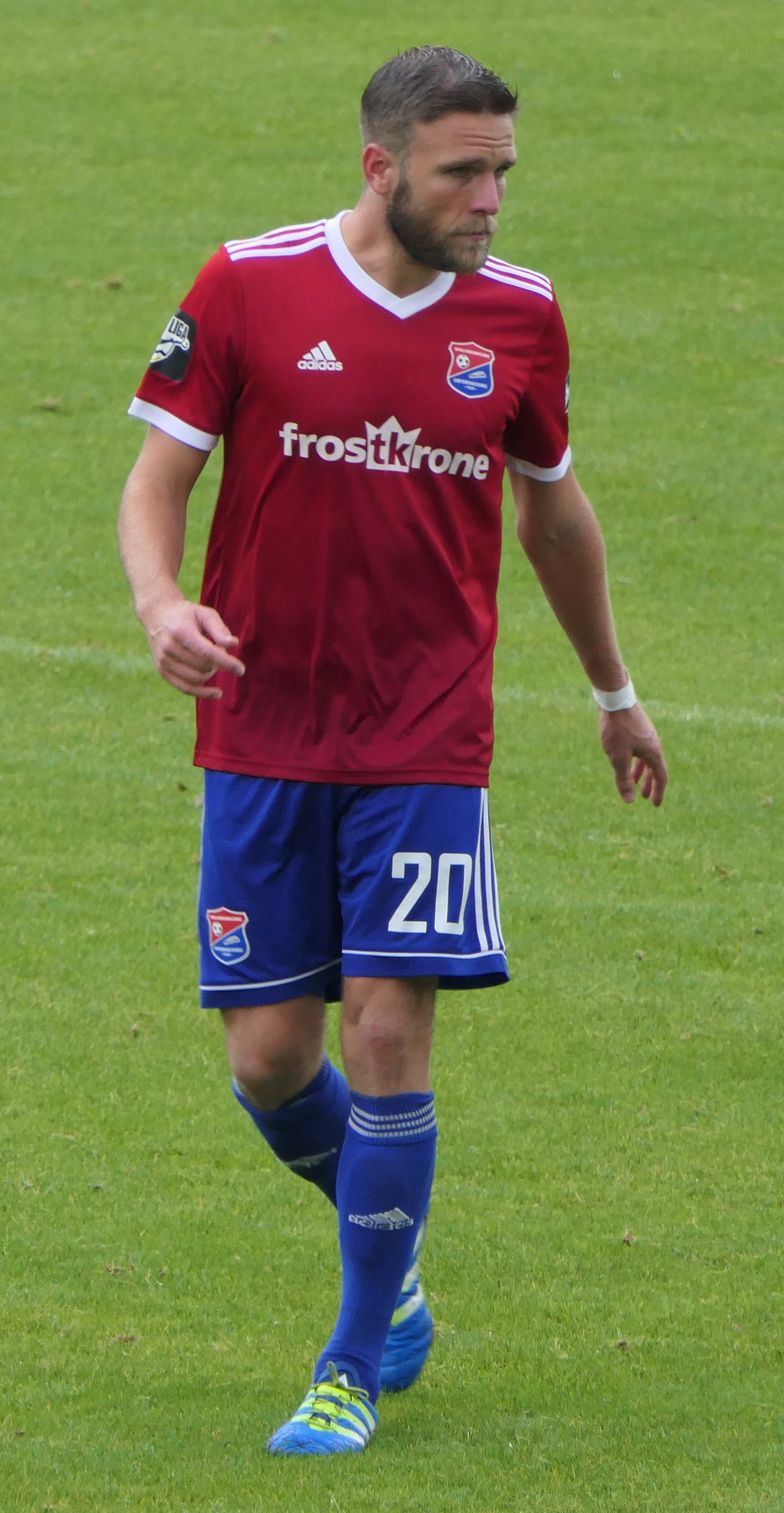
- Stahl with SpVgg Unterhaching in 2018

Personal information
- Date of birth: 20 August 1988 (age 38)
- Place of birth: Hardheim, West Germany
- Height: 1.82 m (6 ft 0 in)
- Position: Defensive midfielder

Youth career
- 1994–2002: SV Osterburken
- 2002–2003: TSV Tauberbischofsheim
- 2003–2004: 1899 Hoffenheim
- 2004–2006: 1860 Munich

Senior career*
Years	Team	Apps	(Gls)
2006–2015	1860 Munich II	62	(5)
2009–2016	1860 Munich	123	(10)
2016–2023	SpVgg Unterhaching	111	(8)
Total		296	(23)
- * Club domestic league appearances and goals

Dominik Stahl (born 20 August 1988) is a German former professional footballer who played as a defensive midfielder for 1860 Munich and SpVgg Unterhaching.

== Career ==
=== 1860 Munich ===
Stahl was born Hardheim, Baden-Württemberg, but grew up in Osterburken. He joined 1860 Munich at youth level in 2004, after playing for SV Osterburken, TSV Tauberbischofsheim and 1899 Hoffenheim. He progressed through the academy, before moving up to the under-23 team in the Regionalliga Süd in 2007. He would also go on the win the DFB Youth Cup with the under-19 team the same year.

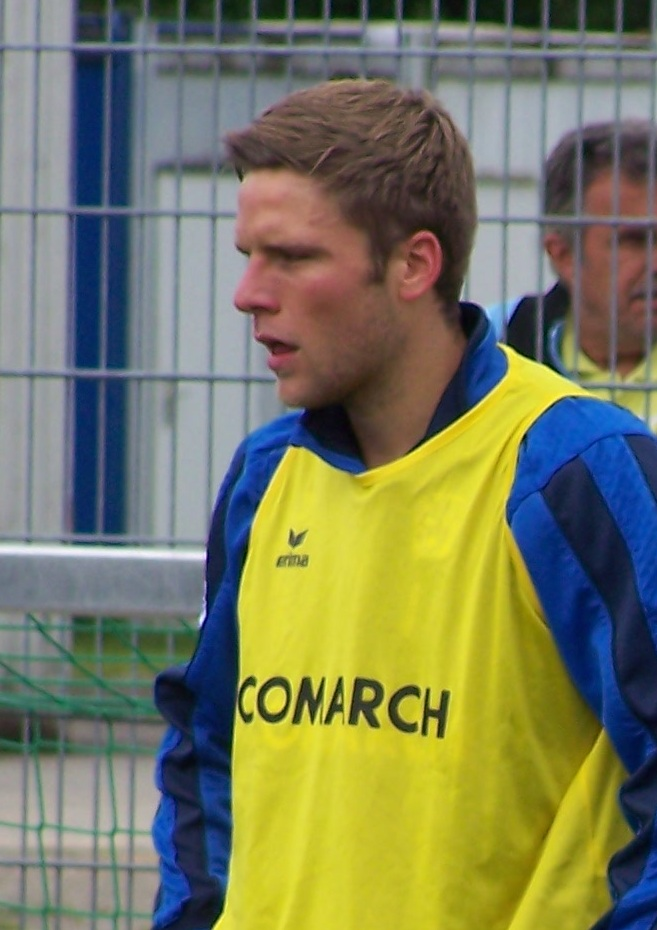
Stahl with 1860 Munich in 2011

Stahl made his first appearance for the reserves in the Regionalliga Süd on 24 February 2007 in a 2–1 away loss against Karlsruher SC II, starting the game before being substituted in the 70th minute for Ralf Schmitt. In the summer of 2009 he was appointed captain of the under-23 team.

After making 13 appearances as a starter in the Regionalliga Süd during the 2009–10 season, Stahl was called up to the first team for the 2. Bundesliga game of 1860 Munich away against Energie Cottbus on 8 November 2009. There, he made his professional debut as part of Die Löwen's starting line-up at Stadion der Freundschaft as his team lost 1–0. In March 2010, he extended his expiring contract with the club until 2012.

In the 2010–11 season, Stahl established himself in defensive midfield, winning the starting position from Florin Lovin. On 30 October 2010, he scored his first professional goal in a game in Karlsruher SC, followed by two more goals in the course of the season. He made a total of 22 appearances that season, with another three games played for the under-23 team in October 2010.

In September 2011, Stahl signed another two-year contract extension, keeping him at 1860 Munich until 2014.

Stahl experienced a particularly strong start to the 2013–14 season, as he managed to score the game-winning goal in four consecutive matches in November and December 2013.

Stahl's contract with 1860 Munich expired on 30 June 2016 and was not renewed, which meant that he left the club after 12 years, in which he made a total of 131 appearances and 10 goals.

=== SpVgg Unterhaching ===
On 7 July 2016, Stahl signed a three-year contract with an option for an additional year with Regionalliga Bayern club SpVgg Unterhaching. He made his competitive debut for the club on 23 July, scoring the opening goal in a 5–1 home win against VfR Garching.

He signed a contract extension on 13 April 2020, keeping him at the club until 2022. In June 2020, he tore his anterior cruciate ligament, sidelining him for an extended period.

In April 2023, Stahl announced his retirement from playing following persistent knee problems.

== Career statistics ==
Appearances and goals by club, season and competition
Club	Season	League			DFB-Pokal		Other		Total	
Club	Season	Division	Apps	Goals	Apps	Goals	Apps	Goals	Apps	Goals
1860 Munich II	2006–07	Regionalliga Süd	7	0	—		—		7	0
1860 Munich II	2007–08	Regionalliga Süd	16	0	—		—		16	0
1860 Munich II	2008–09	Regionalliga Süd	20	2	—		—		20	2
1860 Munich II	2009–10	Regionalliga Süd	14	1	—		—		14	1
1860 Munich II	2010–11	Regionalliga Süd	3	1	—		—		3	1
1860 Munich II	2011–12	Regionalliga Süd	0	0	—		—		0	0
1860 Munich II	2012–13	Regionalliga Süd	0	0	—		—		0	0
1860 Munich II	2013–14	Regionalliga Bayern	1	0	—		—		1	0
1860 Munich II	2014–15	Regionalliga Bayern	0	0	—		—		0	0
1860 Munich II	2015–16	Regionalliga Bayern	1	1	—		—		1	1
1860 Munich II	Total		62	5	—		—		62	5
1860 Munich	2009–10	2. Bundesliga	13	0	0	0	—		13	0
1860 Munich	2010–11	2. Bundesliga	22	3	0	0	—		22	3
1860 Munich	2011–12	2. Bundesliga	28	1	2	0	—		30	1
1860 Munich	2012–13	2. Bundesliga	26	1	2	0	—		28	1
1860 Munich	2013–14	2. Bundesliga	20	5	2	0	—		22	5
1860 Munich	2014–15	2. Bundesliga	10	0	0	0	2 (Note: Appearances in the 2014–15 2. Bundesliga relegation play-offs)	0	12	0
1860 Munich	2015–16	2. Bundesliga	4	0	0	0	—		4	0
1860 Munich	Total		123	10	6	0	2	0	131	10
SpVgg Unterhaching	2016–17	Regionalliga Bayern	31	5	1	0	4 (Note: Two appearances and one goal in 2016–17 Regionalliga promotion play-offs, two appearances in Bavarian Cup)	1	36	6
SpVgg Unterhaching	2017–18	3. Liga	27	3	1	0	3 (Note: Appearances in the Bavarian Cup)	0	31	3
SpVgg Unterhaching	2018–19	3. Liga	25	0	0	0	1	0	26	0
SpVgg Unterhaching	2019–20	3. Liga	26	0	0	0	1	0	27	0
SpVgg Unterhaching	2020–21	3. Liga	0	0	0	0	0	0	0	0
SpVgg Unterhaching	2021–22	Regionalliga Bayern	2	0	0	0	0	0	2	0
SpVgg Unterhaching	2022–23	Regionalliga Bayern	0	0	0	0	0	0	0	0
SpVgg Unterhaching	Total		111	8	2	0	9	1	122	9
Career total			296	23	8	0	11	1	315	24

== Honours ==
SpVgg Unterhaching

- Regionalliga Bayern: 2016–17
