= Daniel Adlung =

German footballer

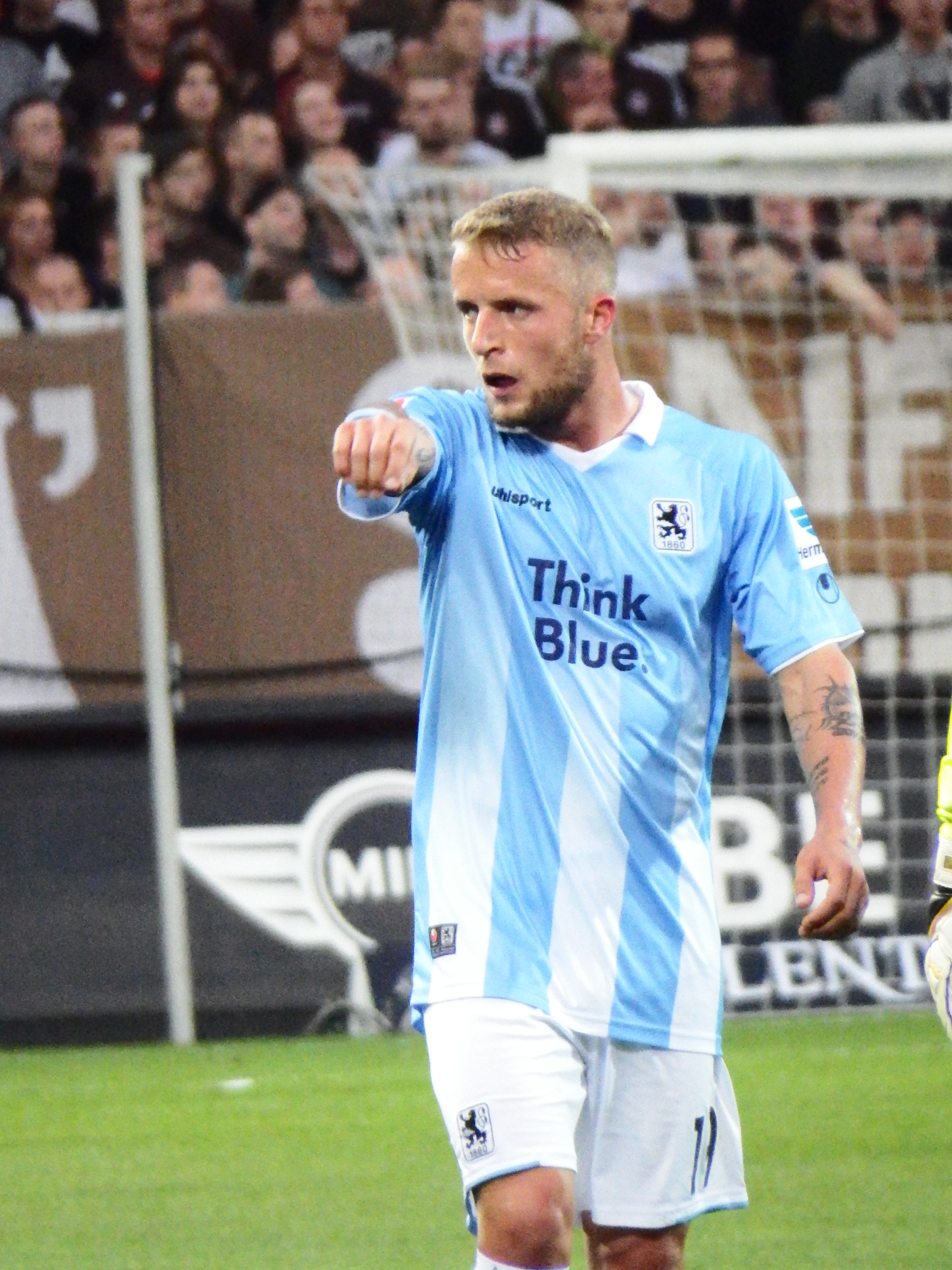
- Adlung with 1860 Munich

Personal information
- Date of birth: 1 October 1987 (age 39)
- Place of birth: Fürth, West Germany
- Height: 1.80 m (5 ft 11 in)
- Position: Midfielder

Youth career
- 1994–1996: SV Hiltpoltstein
- 1996–1998: 1. FC Nürnberg
- 1998–2000: Greuther Fürth
- 2000–2001: 1. FC Nürnberg
- 2001–2005: Greuther Fürth

Senior career*
Years	Team	Apps	(Gls)
2005–2008	Greuther Fürth	74	(4)
2008–2010	VfL Wolfsburg II	20	(3)
2008–2010	VfL Wolfsburg	0	(0)
2009–2010	→ Alemannia Aachen (loan)	25	(2)
2009–2010	→ Alemannia Aachen II (loan)	3	(0)
2010–2013	FC Energie Cottbus	81	(12)
2013–2017	1860 Munich	105	(11)
2017–2018	Adelaide United	26	(5)
2018–2021	Greuther Fürth II	55	(5)
2021	→ 1. FC Schweinfurt 05 (loan)	0	(0)
2021–2022	1. FC Schweinfurt 05	21	(6)
2022–2026	Greuther Fürth II	145	(16)
Total		555	(64)

International career
2008	Germany U21	5	(0)

Managerial career
- 2018–2019: Greuther Fürth II (assistant coach)
- 2026–: Greuther Fürth II (assistant coach)
Medal record
Men's football
Representing Germany
UEFA European Under-21 Championship
Winner	2009 Sweden
- * Club domestic league appearances and goals

Daniel Adlung (born 1 October 1987) is a former German footballer who played as a midfielder. He is currently the assistant coach for Greuther Fürth II.

== Club career ==
=== Greuther Fürth ===
Born in Fürth, West Germany, Adlung began his football career at SV Hiltpoltstein, joining the club when he was seven years old. When Adlung was nine years old, he moved to 1. FC Nürnberg. Every two years, Adlung shuttled back and forth between Greuther Fürth and 1. FC Nürnberg before sticking with Greuther Fürth, where he started his professional football career there. Adlung progressed through the ranks of the club's youth system.

Adlung made his Greuther Fürth debut, coming on as a 78th-minute substitute, in a 1–0 win against Alemannia Aachen on 30 September 2005. He then found himself rotated at playing between the club's first team and the second team. After three months away from the first team, Adlung made his return to the first team against Rot Weiss Ahlen on 2 December 2005, coming on as a 70th-minute substitute, in a 1–0 win. He then set up Greuther Fürth's first goal of the game, in a 2–0 win against Kickers Offenbach on 29 January 2006. At the end of the 2005–06 season, Adlung made seventeen appearances in all competitions.

At the start of the 2006–07 season, Adlung found himself involved in the first team, alternating between a starting and a substitute role. He then set up the club's second goal of the game, in a 3–0 win against Erzgebirge Aue on 17 September 2006. It wasn't until on 13 November 2006 when Adlung scored his first goal of the season, in a 2–2 draw against 1. FC Kaiserslautern. His second goal came on 21 January 2007 against 1860 München and then setting up Greuther Fürth's second goal of the game, in a 3–0 win. Two months later on 2 March 2007, he scored his third goal of the season, in a 2–1 win against FC Augsburg. By the second half of the season, Adlung began playing in unfamiliar right–back position, as well as, rotating in playing the defensive midfield position. He then regained his first team place for the rest of the 2006–07 season. Despite being plagued with injuries, Adlung went on to make thirty–one appearances and scoring three times in all competitions.

At the start of the 2007–08 season, Adlung appeared six matches in the first two months of the season before missing one match due to a toe injury. He then returned to the first team from injury, coming on as a 72nd-minute substitute, in a 2–2 draw against Carl Zeiss Jena on 30 September 2007. Following his return, Adlung then set up the club's first goal of the game for Asen Karaslavov, who went to score twice, in a 3–0 win against 1860 München. However, he suffered a knee injury while training and didn't play for a month. It wasn't until on 16 December 2007 when Adlung returned to the starting line–up against Hoffenheim and scored his first goal of the season, as well as, setting up Greuther Fürth's third goal of the game, in a 4–1 win. He followed up by setting up two goals against Erzgebirge Aue and Mainz. Since returning from injury, Adlung continued to regain as a first team regular for Greuther Fürth, rotating in the left or right midfield positions. At the end of the 2007–08 season, he went on to make thirty appearances and scoring two times in all competitions.

=== VfL Wolfsburg ===
With his contract at Greuther Fürth expire at the end of the 2007–08 season, Adlung was expected to leave after being linked a move away, with clubs, such as, VfL Wolfsburg and Hansa Rostock were interested in signing him. It was announced on 11 May 2008 that he would be joining VfL Wolfsburg.

Adlung made his Wolfsburg debut, coming on as a second-half substitute, in a 7–0 win against FC Oberneuland in the second round of the DFB–Pokal. However, he found himself playing for the club's reserve side instead of the first team. Despite this, Adlung was part of Wolfsburg's squad that won the league, saying: "Of course we celebrated a lot. My family was very happy for me. And even if I haven't got too many assignments yet, it has been a good experience for me that will certainly help me in my career."

=== Alemannia Aachen (loan) ===
It was announced on 5 August 2009 that Adlung was loaned out to Alemannia Aachen for the 2009–10 season and was given a number 24 shirt. It came after when he was told by Wolfsburg that he needs to be loaned out to get first team football.

Adlung made his Alemannia Aachen debut, starting a match and played 45 minutes before being substituted, in a 5–0 loss against St. Pauli on 17 August 2009. However, his first three months at the club saw him placed on the substitute bench. He then regained his place in the first team for Alemannia Aachen. In a match against his former club, Greuther Fürth on 7 December 2009, Adlung set up the club's first goal of the game, in a 2–0 win. It wasn't until on 15 January 2010 when he scored his first goal for Alemannia Aachen, in a 3–1 win against Karlsruher SC. Adlung then set up a goal for Benjamin Auer, who scored twice for the club, in a 2–1 win against Arminia Bielefeld on 12 March 2010. His second goal for Alemannia Aachen came on 28 March 2010, as well as, setting up the club's third goal of the game, in a 4–0 win against FC Augsburg. At the end of the 2009–10 season, he went on to make twenty–five appearances in all competitions. Following this, Adlung returned to his parent club.

=== Energie Cottbus ===
On 3 August 2010, Adlung joined Energie Cottbus for a transfer fee of 180,000 euros, signing a three–year contract.

He made his Energie Cottbus debut, starting a match and set up the club's second goal of the game, in a 2–1 win against TuS Heeslingen in the first round of the DFB-Pokal. Since making his debut for Energie Cottbus, Adlung quickly established himself in the starting eleven, playing in the left–midfield position. He then set up the club's first goal of the game, in a 5–5 draw against Karlsruher SC on 13 September 2010. His first goal for Energie Cottbus came on 17 October 2010, scoring the club's first goal of the game, in a 3–1 win against Paderborn. Two weeks later on 31 October 2010, Adlung scored his second goal for Energie Cottbus, in a 2–1 win against VfL Bochum. However, he was sidelined for the rest of 2010, due to suspension for picking five yellow cards, followed up by injuries. It wasn't until on 15 January 2011 when Adlung returned to the starting line–up against Fortuna Düsseldorf, as the club lost 3–1. A month later on 21 February 2011, he scored his third goal of the season, in a 2–2 draw against Hertha BSC. Two months later on 21 April 2011, Adlung scored his fourth goal of the season, in a 2–1 win against Erzgebirge Aue. Since returning to the first team from injury, he continued to regain his first team place in the starting line–up for the rest of the 2010–11 season. Despite missing two more matches later in the season, Adlung made thirty–two appearances and scoring four times in all competitions.

In the opening game of the 2011–12 season against Dynamo Dresden, Adlung scored his first goal of the season, in a 2–1 win. In a follow–up match against MSV Duisburg, he set up Energie Cottbus’ second goal of the game, in a 2–1 win. Adlung then scored his second goal of the season, as well as, setting up the club's first goal of the game, in a 3–3 draw against Eintracht Frankfurt on 10 September 2011. However, he suffered injuries on two occasions that kept him out for several weeks. It wasn't until on 16 October 2011 when Adlung returned to the first team, coming on as a 79th-minute substitute, in a 1–0 win against FSV Frankfurt. Since returning from injury, he started in the next six matches, including setting up a goal, in a 2–1 loss against Dynamo Dresden on 11 December 2011, before serving a one match suspension for picking up five yellow cards. After returning to the first team from suspension, Adlung then captained Energie Cottbus for the first time against Karlsruher SC on 17 February 2012 and helped the club lose 2–0. In a match against Eintracht Frankfurt on 4 March 2012, he was sent–off for a second bookable offence, in a 1–0 loss. In the last game of the season against Union Berlin, Adlung scored his third goal of the season, in a 2–1 win, as the result saw the club avoid relegation. Despite the setback he received during the 2011–12 season, Adlung remained as the club's first team regular, playing in the midfield position. As a result, he went on to make thirty appearances and scoring three times in all competitions.

At the start of the 2012–13 season, Adlung scored a brace for Energie Cottbus, as the club won 3–0 against Erzgebirge Aue on 10 August 2012. He then set up two goals in two matches between 14 September 2012 and 22 September 2012 against FSV Frankfurt and Jahn Regensburg. In a match against Union Berlin on 29 September 2012, Adlung scored his second goal of the season, but received a straight red card in the 76th minute for insulting the assistant referee. Following this, he served a two match suspension. Up until his sending off, Adlung started in the first eight league matches of the season. After serving a two match suspension, he returned to the starting line–up against 1860 München on 26 October 2012 and helped the club win 1–0. This was followed up by setting up two goals in two matches between 4 November 2012 and 11 November 2012 against Bochum and Dynamo Dresden. Adlung continued to start in the next six matches, including setting up a goal, in a 1–1 draw against FC Ingolstadt 04 on 9 December 2012, before being sent–off for a straight red card in the 88th minute, losing 3–0 against Erzgebirge Aue. After serving a three match suspension, he returned to the starting line–up against Jahn Regensburg on 24 February 2013 and set up the equalising goal, in a 1–1 draw. Two weeks later on 9 March 2013, Adlung played in the striker position for the first time (and did so again in a follow–up), and scored his fourth goal of the season, in a 2–1 win against Union Berlin. However, he found himself out of the first team and was demoted to the club's reserve side that saw him miss five matches. It wasn't until on 12 May 2013 when he returned to the first team, coming on as a 75th-minute substitute against SV Sandhausen and scored his fifth goal of the season, in a 3–0 win. At the end of the 2012–13 season, Adlung went on to make twenty–five appearances and scoring five times in all competitions.

=== TSV 1860 München ===
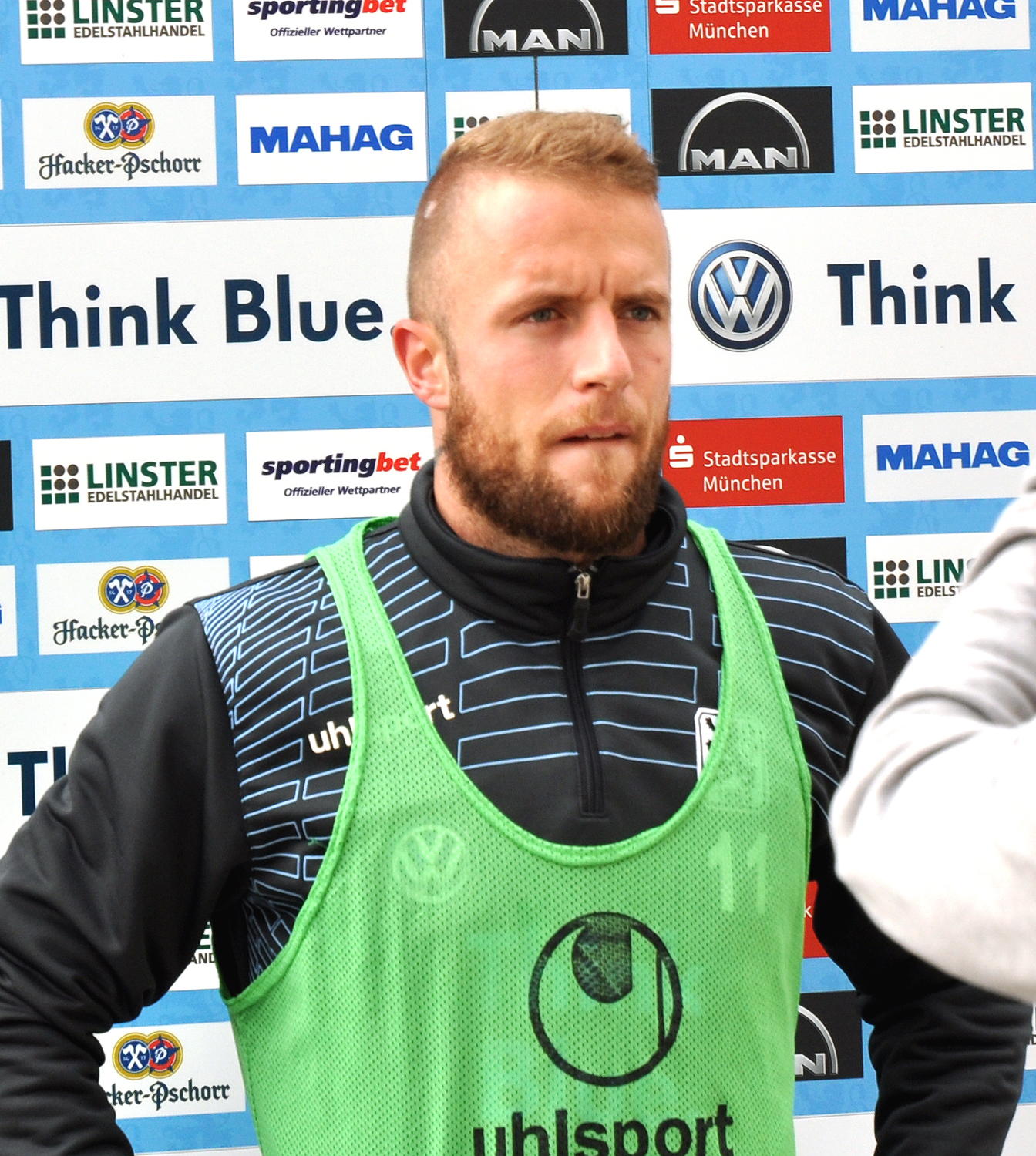
Adlung about to be interviewed during his time at 1860 Munich.

With his contract expected to expire at the end of the 2012–13 season, Adlung confirmed his departure from Energie Cottbus. It was announced on 11 April 2013 that he signed for 1860 Munich on a three–year contract, keeping him until 2016.

Adlung made his 1860 München debut, starting the match and played 75 minutes before being substituted, in a 1–1 draw against St. Pauli in the opening game of the season. In the first round of the DFB–Pokal against 1. FC Heidenheim, he played 120 minutes following a 1–1 draw and successfully converted the penalty in the shootout, as the club won 4–3. Since making his debut for 1860 München, Adlung quickly became a first team regular, establishing himself in the midfield position. It wasn't until on 1 December 2013 when he scored his first goal for the club, in a 2–1 win against VfL Bochum. Adlung then made his 200th league appearances of his career against Fortuna Düsseldorf, coming on as an 81st-minute substitute, in a 1–1 draw on 10 February 2014. In a match against FC Erzgebirge Aue on 15 March 2014, he set up the equalising goal for Yuya Osako in the last minute of the game, to make it 2–2. Two weeks later on 26 March 2014, Adlung scored his second goal of the season, in a 2–1 win against Energie Cottbus. Since the start of the 2013–14 season, he appeared in every match until missing one match after being suspended for picking up yellow cards. After serving a one match suspension, Adlung returned to the starting line–up against Karlsruher SC on 6 April 2014, as 1860 München lost 3–0. This was followed by scoring two goals in the next two matches against Dynamo Dresden and Arminia Bielefeld. At the end of the 2013–14 season, he made thirty–five appearances and scoring four times in all competitions.

At the start of the 2014–15 season, however, Adlung was suspended to the second squad along with his teammates Gábor Király, Vitus Eicher, Yannick Stark and captain Julian Weigl. While Király had assaulted Gary Kagelmacher during a match, the other four players had been out drinking late at night and were overheard talking negatively about the club. Shortly after, he apologised to 1860 München for his action and returned to training with the first team. However, Adlung suffered a back injury that kept him out for weeks. He returned to the first team from injury against SV Sandhausen on 23 September 2014, coming on as a 75th-minute substitute, in a 1–0 loss. In a follow–up match against Greuther Fürth, Adlung set up the club's first goal of the game, in a 2–0 win. After the match, his performance was praised by Manager Markus von Ahlen, saying: "It wouldn't be fair to highlight any player. Adi played a strong game." It wasn't until on 2 November 2014 when he scored his first goal of the season, as well as, setting up 1860 München's two other goals, in a 3–0 win against Bochum. Three weeks later on 22 November 2014, Adlung scored his second goal of the season, as well as setting up the club's fourth goal of the game, in a 4–1 win. Since returning from suspension and injury, he continued to be a first team regular, playing in different midfield positions. Following the absence of Christopher Schindler, Adlung captained 1860 München for the first time against Karlsruher SC on 13 December 2014, as the club lost 3–2. He went on to captain four times of next five matches for the club. His third goal of the season came on 13 March 2015 against Greuther Fürth, in a 3–0 win. Adlung later scored two more goals for 1860 München later in the 2014–15 season against Fortuna Düsseldorf and 1. FC Nürnberg. Despite this, the club finished sixteenth place in the 2. Bundesliga, resulting in them participating in the relegation play-offs against Holstein Kiel. He played in both legs in the relegation play-offs against Holstein Kiel and scored in the second leg, as 1860 München won 2–1 on aggregate to retain its league place. At the end of the 2014–15 season, Adlung made thirty–four appearances and scoring six times in all competitions.

In the opening game of the 2015–16 season against 1. FC Heidenheim, Adlung suffered an injury and was substituted in the 63rd minute, as 1860 München lost 1–0. But he made a quick recovery and returned to the starting line–up against SC Freiburg on 1 August 2015, as the club lost 1–0. Adlung then scored his first goal for the club, in a 2–2 draw against 1. FC Nürnberg on 17 August 2015. Following this, he continued to establish himself in the first team, playing in different midfield positions. Adlung was also appointed as 1860 München's vice captain. He then provided a hat–trick assists; two of were for Rubin Okotie, who scored a hat–trick, in a 4–4 draw against Paderborn on 28 November 2015. Since the start of the 2015–16 season, Adlung started in every match until he suffered ankle injury during a 1–1 draw against Bochum on 21 February 2016 and was substituted at half time. Following this, Adlung was sidelined for six weeks following an operation on his ankle. It wasn't until on 8 April 2016 when he returned to the first team, coming on as a 73rd-minute substitute, in a 1–0 loss against Greuther Fürth. In a follow–up match against MSV Duisburg, Adlung captained the club for the first time in the 2015–16 season, as they lost 2–1. Since returning from injury, he appeared in the last six matches of the season, as 1860 München successfully avoided relegation once again. At the end of the 2015–16 season, Adlung went on to make thirty–one appearances and scoring once in all competitions. Following this, his future at the club became uncertain as he yet to sign a contract. It was announced on 30 June 2016 that Adlung signed a contract extension with 1860 München, keeping him until 2018.

At the start of the 2016–17 season, Adlung continued to establish himself in the first team, playing in different midfield positions. It wasn't until on 28 October 2016 when he scored his first goal of the season, coming on as an 85th-minute substitute, in a 6–2 win against Erzgebirge Aue. However, by mid–October, Adlung soon found his playing time, mostly coming from the substitute bench. But he did appear in the starting line–up, appearing five times between 21 November 2016 and 3 February 2017. Following this, Adlung appeared on the substitute bench for the rest of the 2016–17 season, as 1860 München were officially relegated after losing 3–1 against Jahn Regensburg on aggregate. At the end of the 2016–17 season, he went on to make seventeen appearances and scoring once in all competitions.

Following the club's relegation, Adlung was critical of the club's performance that saw him relegated. Although his contract expires at the end of the 2017–18 season, he was allowed to leave 1860 München after being surplus of requirement. It was announced on 4 September 2017 that Adlung and the club agreed to terminate his contract, making him a free agent.

=== Adelaide United ===
In September 2017, Adlung joined Adelaide United, signing a two–year contract.

Adlung made his Adelaide United debut, starting the whole game, in a 1–1 draw against Wellington Phoenix in the opening game of the season. In a follow–up match against Brisbane Roar, he set up the club's second goal of the game, in a 2–1 win. Since making his debut for the club, Adlung quickly established himself in the starting eleven, playing in the midfield positions. He scored his first goal for Adelaide United in a 2–1 win over Western Sydney Wanderers in the semi-final of the 2017 FFA Cup. A month later on 16 November 2017, Adlung scored his second goal of the season, in a 2–1 win against Central Coast Mariners. Five days later on 21 November 2017, he started and played 120 minutes in the FFA Cup Final against Sydney FC, as the club lost 2–1. However, in a match against Melbourne Victory on 8 December 2017, Adlung was sent–off for a second bookable offence in the 82nd minute, in a 2–1 win. After serving a one match suspension, he returned to the starting line–up against Central Coast Mariners on 26 December 2017 and helped Adelaide United win 1–0. During a 3–0 win against Perth Glory on 5 January 2018, Adlung scored the club's first goal of the game before suffering a back injury that saw him substituted in the 41st minute. After recovering from a back injury that saw him miss one match, he continued to remain in the first team for the rest of the 2017–18 season. Adlung then went on to score three more goals, including a brace against Newcastle Jets on 30 March 2018. At the end of the 2017–18 season, he went on to make twenty–eight appearances and scoring six times in all competitions.

Following this, Adlung was released by Adelaide United in May 2018. It was later revealed that homesickness was the factor of his release.

=== Return to Greuther Fürth ===
Adlung returned to Germany and re–joined Greuther Fürth as the club's player-assistant coach on 26 June 2018, assigning to play for the second team.

Adlung started well for SpVgg Greuther Fürth II, setting up two goals in the first two league matches. He started in a number of matches for the club since joining SpVgg Greuther Fürth II. It wasn't until on 17 November 2018 when Adlung scored his first goal for the second team, in a 2–2 draw against Schalding-Heining. In a match against TSV 1860 Rosenheim on 23 March 2019, he received a straight red card for his unsportsmanlike conduct, as SpVgg Greuther Fürth II drew 1–1. Despite serving a three match suspension, Adlung suffered a back injury that kept him out further. But Adlung returned to the starting line–up against VfB Eichstätt on 4 May 2019 and played the whole game, as the second team drew 1–1. At the end of the 2018–19 season, he went on to make twenty–eight appearances and scoring once in all competitions for SpVgg Greuther Fürth II.

At the start of the 2019–20 season, Adlung continued to start for SpVgg Greuther Fürth II. He contributed four assists in the first six matches of the season. It wasn't until on 7 September 2019 when Adlung scored his first goal of the season, in a 3–1 loss against FV Illertissen. Adlung then scored his second goal of the season, in a 2–0 win against TSV 1860 Rosenheim on 19 October 2019. However, the 2019–20 season was interrupted and eventuality cancelled due to COVID-19 pandemic. Up until the cancellation of the season, he started in every match, making twenty–three appearances and scoring two times in all competitions for the second team.

== International career ==
Adlung made his Germany U17 debut on 20 October 2003 against Portugal U17, starting the whole game, as the U17 side lost 2–0. He went on to make three appearances for Germany U17. In November 2004, Adlung was called up to the Germany U18 squad, making his debut for the U18 side, in a 2–1 loss against Turkey U18 on 23 November 2004. He went on to make five appearances for the U18 side.

Adlung made his Germany U19 debut, starting a match against China U19, as they drew 1–1 on 12 September 2005. He then scored his first Germany U19 goal, in a 6–0 win against Cyprus U19 on 26 May 2006. Three months later, Adlung received a bronze medal for the Fritz-Walter-Medal. Adlung made nine appearances for the U19 side.

Adlung made his Germany U20 on 30 August 2006, starting the whole game, as the U20 side won 1–0 against Switzerland U20. He went on to make four appearances for the U20 side. Adlung then made his Germany U21 debut, coming on as a 66th-minute substitute, in a 2–0 win against Scotland U21 on 6 February 2007. Two years later, he was called up to the U21 squad for the 2009 UEFA Under-21 Championship. However, Adlung appeared as an unused substitute throughout the tournament, as Germany U21 won the tournament. Adlung went on to make five appearances for the U21 side.

== Personal life ==
Adlung has a sister and brother. His father, Herbert, was supportive of him playing football, having known the case, knowing that he "would one day make the step into the big football business". Adlung is a vegan after being given copies of the Attila Hildmann and Brendan Brazier books.

Adlung is married to his long-term girlfriend, Julia, and together, they have a daughter, Aviana Rose.

== Honours ==
VfL Wolfsburg

- Bundesliga: 2008–09

Adelaide United

- FFA Cup: 2018

1. FC Schweinfurt 05

- Regionalliga Bayern: 2019–21

Germany U21

- UEFA Under-21 Championship: 2009
