= Korbinian Vollmann =

German footballer

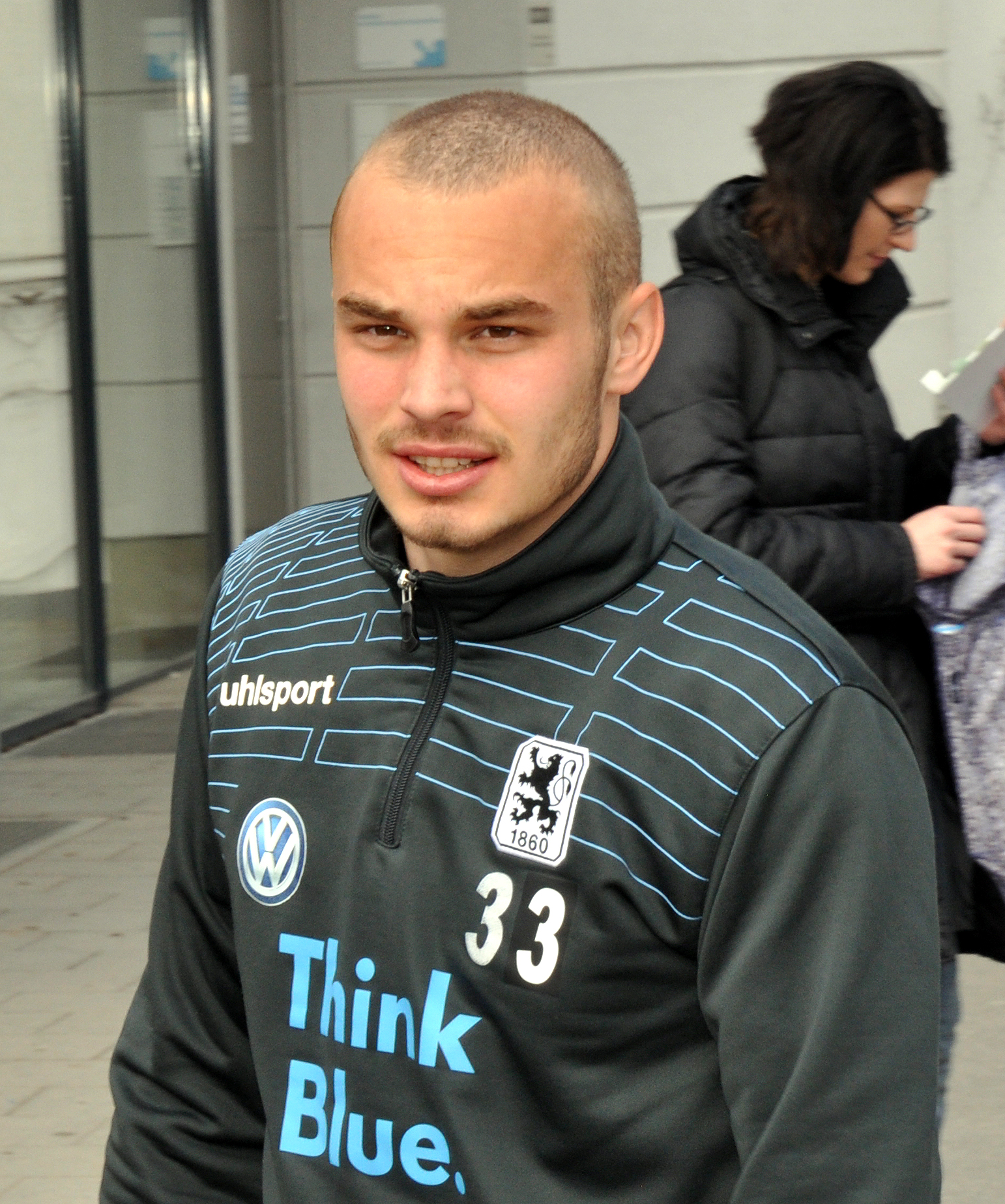
- Vollmann in 2015

Personal information
- Date of birth: 27 October 1993 (age 33)
- Place of birth: Munich, Germany
- Height: 1.75 m (5 ft 9 in)
- Position: Attacking midfielder

Youth career
- SC Kirchheim
- –2004: SV Pullach
- 2004–2011: 1860 Munich

Senior career*
Years	Team	Apps	(Gls)
2011–2015	1860 Munich II	75	(26)
2011–2012	→ SpVgg Unterhaching (loan)	13	(1)
2012–2016	1860 Munich	33	(2)
2016–2019	SV Sandhausen	55	(6)
2019–2021	Hansa Rostock	54	(4)
- * Club domestic league appearances and goals as of 09:18, 5 August 2021 (UTC)

Korbinian Vollmann (born 27 October 1993) is a German professional footballer, who most recently played as an attacking midfielder for FC Hansa Rostock.

== Club career ==
Vollmann is a youth exponent of 1860 Munich. After he played his first four games for 1860 Munich II in the 2011–12 season in the Regionalliga Süd he went on a loan to 3. Liga club Unterhaching for the rest of the season and managed to score once in 13 appearances.

In the upcoming years, Vollmann was a regular player of 1860 Munich II in the Regionalliga Bayern. In the 2014–15 season he replaced injured Michael Kokocinski as captain in several games and scored 14 goals out of 20 appearances.

After this good run of form Vollmann gave his debut for the first team on 22 November 2014 in a 4–1 away win against Union Berlin being substituted for Valdet Rama in 76th minute. In March 2015 he extended his contract until June 2017. Vollmann played his first full match from the beginning on against SV Sandhausen on 8 March 2015. On 13 March 2015, he scored his first goal for the first team of 1860 Munich in a 3–0 away win against Greuther Fürth, when he brought his team to a 2–0 lead in the 65th minute.

On 20 January 2016, he signed for SV Sandhausen.

== Club statistics ==
As of matches played on 30 March 2018.

Appearances and goals by club, season and competition
Club	Season	League			Cup		Other^{1}		Total		Ref.
Club	Season	Division	Apps	Goals	Apps	Goals	Apps	Goals	Apps	Goals	Ref.
1860 Munich II	2011–12	Regionalliga Süd	4	1	—		—		4	1	
1860 Munich II	2012–13	Regionalliga Bayern	27	4	—		2	0	29	4	
1860 Munich II	2013–14	Regionalliga Bayern	24	7	—		—		24	7	
1860 Munich II	2014–15	Regionalliga Bayern	20	14	—		—		20	14	
1860 Munich II	Total		75	26	—		2	0	77	26	—
SpVgg Unterhaching (loan)	2011–12	3. Liga	13	1	—				13	1	
1860 Munich	2014–15	2. Bundesliga	18	1	0	0	2	0	20	1	
1860 Munich	2015–16	2. Bundesliga	15	1	1	0	—		16	1	
1860 Munich	Total		33	2	1	0	2	0	36	2	—
SV Sandhausen	2015–16	2. Bundesliga	11	3	0	0	—		11	3	
SV Sandhausen	2016–17	2. Bundesliga	17	3	2	0	—		19	3	
SV Sandhausen	2017–18	2. Bundesliga	8	0	1	0	—		9	0	
SV Sandhausen	Total		36	6	3	0	—		39	6	—
Career total			157	35	4	0	4	0	165	35	—

- 1.Including Regionalliga playoff and relegation playoff.
