= SG Arheilgen =

German football club

- Full name: Sportgemeinde Arheilgen e.V.
- Nickname(s): SGA
- Founded: 1904
- Ground: Am Arheilger Mühlchen
- League: Kreisoberliga Darmstadt/Gross-Gerau (VIII)
- 2015–16: 3rd
Home colours	Away colours

SG Arheilgen is a German football club from the Darmstadt-Arheilgen district of Darmstadt, Hesse.

== History ==
The club was established as Fußball-Club Olympia 04 Arheilgen on 3 July 1904 and on 20 September 1913 changed its name to Fußballverein Olympia 04 Arheilgen. In 1921 FV merged with FC Germania 06 Arheilgen to form Spielvereinigung 04 Arheilgen. In 1939 SpVgg merged with the gymnastics club Turnverein 1876 Arheilgen (formed 12 August 1876) to create Sportverein 1876 Arheilgen.

Following World War II the club was briefly lost before reappearing as SG 1876 Arheilgen in late 1945. In 1954 part of the membership left to form FC 04 Arheilgen which later became FCA Darmstadt.

SG took up play in the Amateurliga Hessen (III) in 1947 where they played 6 of the next 7 seasons. The team played a single season (1950–51) in the second tier 2. Liga-Süd and were relegated after finishing 15th. They slipped from sight into lower tier local football in 1954.

The club played in the Kreisoberliga Darmstadt (VIII) in 2014–15, finishing fifth.
