= Vladimír Kováč =

Slovak footballer

Personal information
- Full name: Vladimír Kováč
- Date of birth: 29 April 1991 (age 35)
- Place of birth: Bojnice, Czechoslovakia
- Height: 1.78 m (5 ft 10 in)
- Position: Right back

Youth career
- 1997–2006: TJ Nitrianske Rudno
- 2007–2010: Prievidza

Senior career*
Years	Team	Apps	(Gls)
–2010	Prievidza		
2010–2012	Ružomberok	11	(0)
2012–2013	Wolfratshausen	20	(4)
2013–2016	1860 Munich II	45	(0)
2015–2016	1860 Munich	2	(0)
2016–2018	Wehen Wiesbaden	17	(1)
2018–2019	Wacker Nordhausen	23	(0)
2019	Wacker Nordhausen II	15	(0)
2019–2020	Wacker Nordhausen	2	(0)

International career
	Slovakia U-19	4	(0)
- * Club domestic league appearances and goals as of 20:38, 1 July 2020 (UTC)

Vladimír Kováč (born 29 April 1991) is a Slovak football defender.

== Career ==
He joined 1860 Munich in summer 2013 and played the first season for the reserve team. In the last match of the 2014-15 season he made his first appearance for 1860's 2. Bundesliga team. In the 2015-16 season he was sidelined for a long time with a syndesmosis ligament tear. On 1 July 2016, he signed a two-year contract with Wehen Wiesbaden.

On 23 January 2018, Kováč joined FSV Wacker 90 Nordhausen. In October 2019, he was relegated to the club's reserve team alongside 4 other teammates. However, he went to play with the first team again in December 2019.
