= Fejsal Mulić =

Serbian footballer

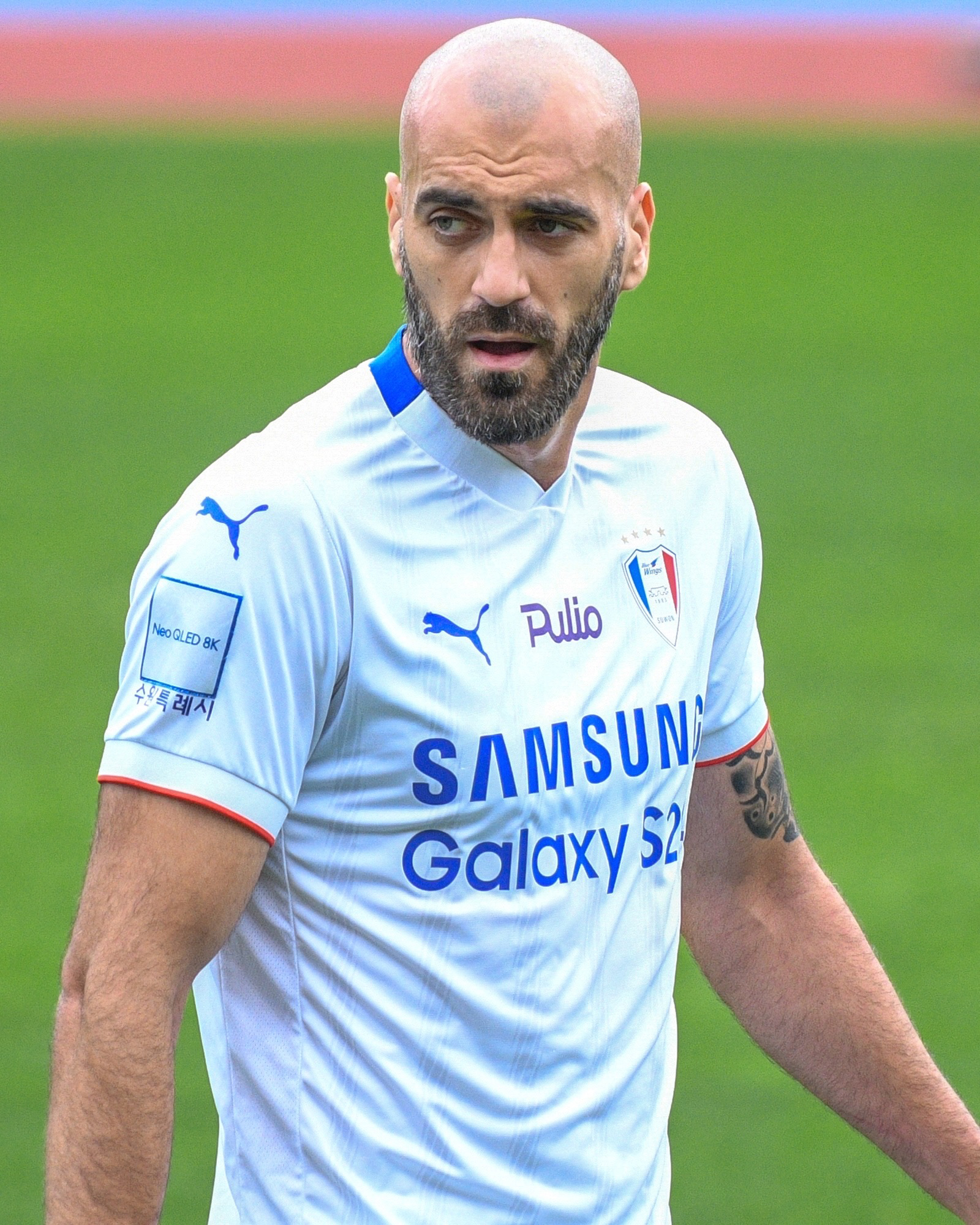
- Mulić in October 2024

Personal information
- Date of birth: 3 October 1994 (age 32)
- Place of birth: Novi Pazar, FR Yugoslavia
- Height: 2.03 m (6 ft 8 in)
- Position: Forward

Team information
- Current team: Novi Pazar
- Number: 99

Youth career
- Novi Pazar

Senior career*
Years	Team	Apps	(Gls)
2012	Novi Pazar	1	(0)
2013–2016	1860 Munich II	37	(9)
2014–2016	1860 Munich	13	(0)
2016–2017	Mouscron	17	(1)
2017–2018	Hapoel Acre	16	(2)
2018–2019	Hapoel Tel Aviv	28	(7)
2019	→ Bnei Yehuda (loan)	10	(1)
2019	Mura	14	(2)
2020	Velež Mostar	19	(9)
2021–2022	Seongnam	69	(22)
2023–2024	Suwon Samsung Bluewings	57	(14)
2025	Yelimay	10	(3)
2025	Buriram United	8	(3)
2026	Sogdiana	11	(4)
2026–	Novi Pazar	2	(0)

International career
2015–2017	Serbia U21	3	(1)
- * Club domestic league appearances and goals as of 27 July 2026

Fejsal Mulić (Serbian Cyrillic: Фејсал Мулић; born 3 October 1994) is a Serbian professional footballer who plays as a forward for Novi Pazar.

== Club career ==
Born in Novi Pazar, Mulić began his career in his native Serbia, playing for the young team of Novi Pazar. In 2012, he made his debut with Novi Pazar in the 2011–12 Serbian SuperLiga playing against Jagodina.

After having played for 1860 Munich II since 2013, Mulić made his debut for 1860 Munich on 22 November 2014 being substituted in the 88th minute for Rubin Okotie at a 4–1 away win against Union Berlin. He scored his first goal for 1860 Munich on 8 August 2015 in the first round of the DFB-Pokal against Hoffenheim, when he brought his team to a 2–0 victory in the 93rd minute. Mulić was released by 1860 Munich on 19 January 2016.

During his first game with Royal Excel Mouscron, he entered at the 57th minute and scored his first goal in the Belgian First Division A in the 89th minute against Lokeren. On 13 July 2017, Mulić signed with Hapoel Acre of the Israeli Premier League. He then joined Hapoel Tel Aviv, and later on was sent on a loan to Bnei Yehuda. On 12 July 2019, he joined Slovenian PrvaLiga club Mura.

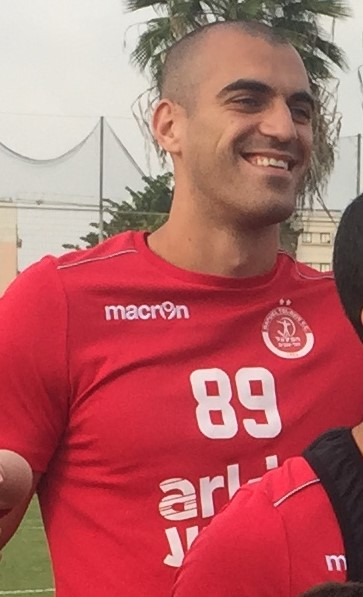
Mulić with Hapoel Tel Aviv in 2018.

On 4 July 2020, Mulić signed a contract with Bosnian Premier League club Velež Mostar. He made his official debut for Velež in a league match against Željezničar on 1 August 2020. Mulić scored his first goal for Velež in a Mostar derby win against Zrinjski Mostar.

On 19 January 2021, he signed a contract with K League 1 club Seongnam for an undisclosed transfer fee.

On 7 February 2023, Mulić joined fellow South Korean club Suwon Samsung Bluewings for an undisclosed fee.

== International career ==
Mulić made his international debut for the Serbia U21 national team against Lithuania on 8 September 2015. After that game, he would go on to make two more appearances, scoring one goal.

== Career statistics ==
As of 6 April 2025

Club performance			League		Cup		Continental		Other		Total	
Club	Season	Division	Apps	Goals	Apps	Goals	Apps	Goals	Apps	Goals	Apps	Goals
Novi Pazar	2011–12	Serbian SuperLiga	1	0	0	0	—		—		1	0
1860 Munich II	2013–14	Regionalliga Bayern	18	1	—		—		—		18	1
1860 Munich II	2014–15	Regionalliga Bayern	18	8	—		—		—		18	8
1860 Munich II	2015–16	Regionalliga Bayern	1	0	—		—		—		1	0
1860 Munich II	Total		37	9	—		—		—		37	9
1860 Munich	2014–15	2. Bundesliga	6	0	—		—		—		6	0
1860 Munich	2015–16	2. Bundesliga	7	0	1	1	—		—		8	1
1860 Munich	Total		13	0	1	1	—		—		14	1
Mouscron	2015–16	Belgian Pro League	5	1	0	0	—		—		5	1
Mouscron	2016–17	Belgian Pro League	12	0	0	0	—		—		12	0
Mouscron	Total		17	1	0	0	—		—		17	1
Hapoel Acre	2017–18	Israeli Premier League	16	2	1	0	—		4 (Note: Appearance(s) in Toto Cup)	1	21	3
Hapoel Tel Aviv	2017–18	Liga Leumit	16	7	0	0	—		—		16	7
Hapoel Tel Aviv	2018–19	Israeli Premier League	12	0	1	1	—		5	0	18	1
Hapoel Tel Aviv	Total		28	7	1	1	—		5	0	34	8
Bnei Yehuda (loan)	2018–19	Israeli Premier League	10	1	0	0	—		—		10	1
Mura	2019–20	Slovenian PrvaLiga	14	2	3	1	—		—		17	3
Velež Mostar	2020–21	Bosnian Premier League	19	9	2	0	—		—		21	9
Seongnam	2021	K League 1	36	13	0	0	—		—		36	13
Seongnam	2022	K League 1	33	9	2	0	—		—		35	9
Seongnam	Total		69	22	2	0	—		—		71	22
Suwon Samsung Bluewings	2023	K League 1	22	4	0	0	—		—		22	4
Suwon Samsung Bluewings	2024	K League 2	35	10	2	0	—		—		37	10
Suwon Samsung Bluewings	Total		57	14	2	0	—		—		59	14
Career total			281	67	12	3	0	0	9	1	302	71
