= Sertan Yiğenoğlu =

German-Turkish footballer

Personal information
- Date of birth: 4 January 1995 (age 31)
- Place of birth: Siegburg, Germany
- Height: 1.88 m (6 ft 2 in)
- Positions: Centre back; left back

Team information
- Current team: FC Hennef 05
- Number: 13

Youth career
- –2009: Jugendfußballschule Hennef
- 2009–2014: 1. FC Köln

Senior career*
Years	Team	Apps	(Gls)
2014–2015	FC Hennef 05	17	(0)
2015–2016	1860 Munich II	17	(1)
2015–2016	1860 Munich	13	(0)
2016–2017	SV Wehen Wiesbaden	9	(0)
2017–2019	Konyaspor	0	(0)
2017–2019	→ Anadolu Selçukspor (loan)	66	(7)
2020	Tuzlaspor	0	(0)
2020–2021	Sportfreunde Lotte	31	(0)
2021–2022	Uşakspor	20	(0)
2022–2023	Turgutluspor	22	(1)
2023–2024	Uşakspor	13	(0)
2024–	FC Hennef 05	0	(0)
- * Club domestic league appearances and goals as of 27 January 2024

Sertan Yiğenoğlu (born 4 January 1995) is a German-Turkish footballer who plays as a centre back for Mittelrheinliga club FC Hennef 05.

== Club career ==
Yiğenoğlu is a youth exponent from 1. FC Köln. He first played professional football for FC Hennef 05 in the Regionalliga West during the 2014–15 season. Since the 2015–16 season he plays for the second team of 1860 Munich in the Regionalliga Bayern. He gave his debut for the first team in a 0–1 home defeat against Karlsruher SC on 19 October 2015.

At the beginning of the 2016–17 season Yiğenoğlu transferred to SV Wehen Wiesbaden.

== International career ==
Yegenoglu was born in Germany to parents of Turkish descent. He is eligible for both the Turkish and Germany national teams - he accepted a callup to the Turkish U19s, but has yet to make an appearance for either side.

== Club statistics ==
As of match played 8 May 2016

Club	Season	League			DFB-Pokal		Other		Total	
Club	Season	Division	Apps	Goals	Apps	Goals	Apps	Goals	Apps	Goals
Hennef 05	2014–15	Regionalliga West	17	0	—		0	0	17	0
1860 Munich II	2015–16	Regionalliga Bayern	14	1	—		0	0	14	1
1860 Munich	2015–16	2. Bundesliga	13	0	2	0	0	0	14	0
Career total			44	1	2	0	0	0	46	1
