= Yannick Stark =

German footballer (born 1990)

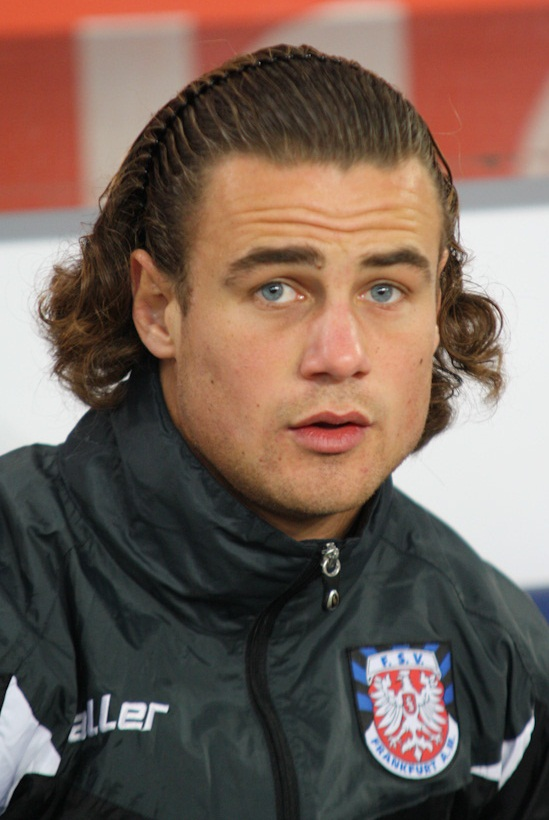
- Stark with FSV Frankfurt in 2012

Personal information
- Date of birth: 28 October 1990 (age 36)
- Place of birth: Darmstadt, Germany
- Height: 1.86 m (6 ft 1 in)
- Position: Central midfielder

Team information
- Current team: Hessen Kassel
- Number: 30

Youth career
- SG Arheilgen
- SC Hassia Dieburg
- Eintracht Frankfurt

Senior career*
Years	Team	Apps	(Gls)
2008–2010	Eintracht Frankfurt II	33	(2)
2010–2011	MSV Duisburg	0	(0)
2010–2011	→ Darmstadt 98 (loan)	29	(6)
2011–2013	FSV Frankfurt	60	(4)
2013–2015	1860 Munich	44	(4)
2015–2020	Darmstadt 98	82	(5)
2016–2017	→ FSV Frankfurt (loan)	33	(8)
2020–2022	Dynamo Dresden	67	(3)
2022–2023	Manisa	17	(0)
2024	SpVgg Unterhaching	7	(0)
2025–	Hessen Kassel	38	(6)
- * Club domestic league appearances and goals as of 26 June 2026

Yannick Stark (born 28 October 1990) is a German professional footballer who plays as a central midfielder for Hessen Kassel.

== Career ==
Stark began his youth career at SG Arheilgen and SC Hasia Dieburg before being signed by the youth department of Eintracht Frankfurt. At Frankfurt, he played with Under 19's in the Under 19 Bundesliga while also featuring for the Under 23 side in the Regionalliga Süd. In only his second season, while being eligible to play for the Under 19's, he became a regular for Eintracht Frankfurt II in the Regionalliga Süd, competing in 31 games.

At the end of the season Stark was signed by 2. Bundesliga club MSV Duisburg but was loaned to his homeside Darmstadt 98 immediately. At Darmstadt 98 he helped his team get promoted to the 3. Liga by coming first in the league in the 2011–12 season. In the penultimate game Stark scored the winning goal which ensured promotion with a game to spare. He was then voted "Player of the season" by the readers of the local newspaper Darmstädter Echo.

In the summer of 2011 Stark was signed by FSV Frankfurt for two years after his contract with MSV Duisburg was nullified. He gave his debut on 15 July 2011 in the first game of the season against Union Berlin. Stark featured in 29 games in his first 2. Bundesliga season. In the following season, he scored his first goal for Frankfurt against SG Sonnenhof Großaspach in the DFB-Pokal and against Erzgebirge Aue in the league.

In the 2013–14 season Stark moved to 1860 Munich within the league and signed a contract valid for two years.

In the winter of the following season Stark moved back to his old club Darmstadt 98 with whom he was then promoted to the Bundesliga for the 2015–16 season.

Stark signed for 3. Liga club Dynamo Dresden in the summer of 2020 following the expiry of his contract at Darmstadt 98.

On 15 February 2024, Stark signed for 3. Liga club SpVgg Unterhaching on a contract for the rest of the season.

On 22 January 2025, Stark joined Hessen Kassel in the Regionalliga Südwest on season-long contract.
