= Gary Kagelmacher =

Uruguayan footballer (born 1988)

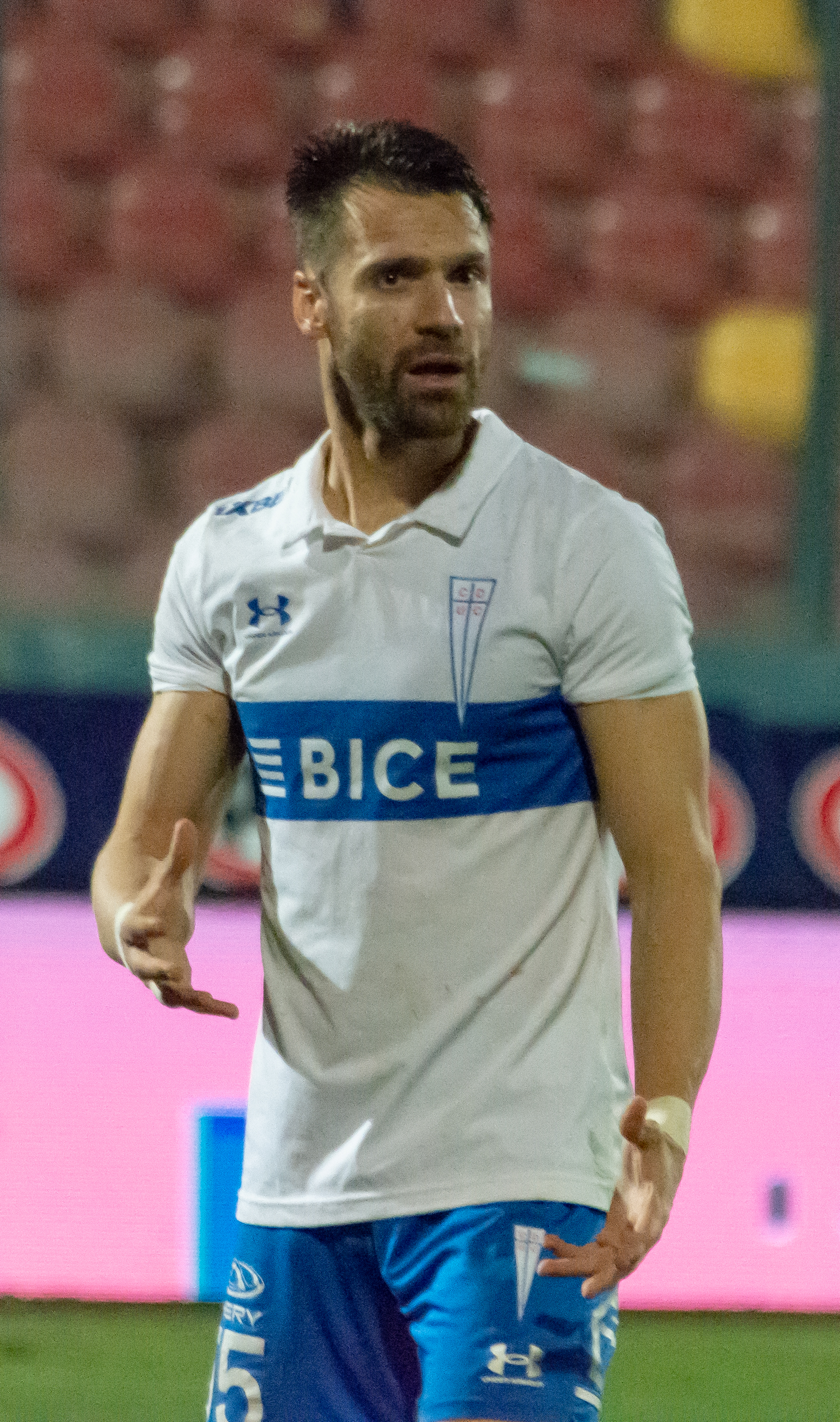
- Kagelmacher with Universidad Católica in 2023

Personal information
- Full name: Gary Christofer Kagelmacher Pérez
- Date of birth: 21 April 1988 (age 38)
- Place of birth: Montevideo, Uruguay
- Height: 1.83 m (6 ft 0 in)
- Position: Defender

Team information
- Current team: Montevideo City Torque
- Number: 24

Senior career*
Years	Team	Apps	(Gls)
2006–2008	Danubio	2	(0)
2007–2008	→ Real Madrid B (loan)	27	(2)
2008–2011	Real Madrid B	59	(4)
2009	Real Madrid	1	(0)
2010–2011	→ Beerschot (loan)	21	(3)
2011–2012	Beerschot	19	(4)
2012–2014	Monaco	52	(3)
2013	Monaco B	1	(0)
2013–2014	→ Valenciennes (loan)	31	(0)
2014–2016	1860 Munich	58	(3)
2016–2017	Maccabi Haifa	34	(1)
2017–2020	Kortrijk	61	(2)
2020–2021	Peñarol	59	(3)
2022	León	7	(0)
2022–2024	Universidad Católica	51	(4)
2025–	Montevideo City Torque	45	(3)

International career
2005	Uruguay U17	3	(0)
2007	Uruguay U20	4	(0)
- * Club domestic league appearances and goals as of 21:32, 10 May 2026 (UTC)

Gary Christofer Kagelmacher Pérez (born 21 April 1988) is a Uruguayan professional footballer who plays as a right-back or a central defender for Liga AUF Uruguaya club Montevideo City Torque.

== Club career ==
Born in Montevideo of German descent, Kagelmacher began his professional career with local club Danubio FC. In 2007, aged 19, he was loaned to Real Madrid Castilla in the Spanish Segunda División B, being first choice from an early stage; the move was made permanent at the end of his first season.

In the last match of the 2008–09 campaign, Kagelmacher made his La Liga debut with Real Madrid, starting in a 2–1 away loss against CA Osasuna. In the summer of 2010, he was loaned to K.F.C. Germinal Beerschot of the Belgian Pro League.

Kagelmacher agreed to a permanent four-year contract at Beerschot on 6 May 2011. In the following transfer window, however, he moved countries again and signed with AS Monaco FC of the French Ligue 2.

On 30 June 2014, Kagelmacher joined TSV 1860 Munich on a three-year deal, arriving from Valenciennes FC. He scored his first goals for his new team on 8 March of the following year, but in a 3–2 home defeat to SV Sandhausen.

After one season in the Israeli Premier League with Maccabi Haifa F.C. and two and a half in the Belgian top division at the service of K.V. Kortrijk, the 31-year-old Kagelmacher returned to his homeland in the 2020 January transfer window after signing with Peñarol. He competed abroad subsequently, with Club León in the Mexican Liga MX and Club Deportivo Universidad Católica in the Chilean Primera División.

Kagelmacher went back to Uruguay and its Liga AUF in the 2025 season, on a contract at newly promoted Montevideo City Torque.

== International career ==
Kagelmacher played for the Uruguay under-17 side at the 2005 FIFA World Championship. Two years later, he appeared with the under-20s at the World Cup.

== Career statistics ==
As of 29 May 2025

Appearances and goals by club, season and competition
Club	Season	League			National Cup		League Cup		Other^{1}		Total		Ref.
Club	Season	Division	Apps	Goals	Apps	Goals	Apps	Goals	Apps	Goals	Apps	Goals	Ref.
Danubio	2007–08	Uruguayan Primera División	2	0	0	0	—		2	0	4	0	
Real Madrid B (loan)	2007–08	Segunda División B	27	2	—		—		—		27	2	
Real Madrid B	2008–09	Segunda División B	27	1	—		—		—		27	1	
Real Madrid B	2009–10	Segunda División B	32	3	—		—		—		32	3	
Real Madrid B	Total		59	4	—		—		—		59	4	—
Real Madrid	2008–09	La Liga	1	0	0	0	—		—		1	0	
Beerschot (loan)	2010–11	Belgian Pro League	21	3	4	0	—		6 (Note: Appearances in Belgian Pro League playoffs)	0	31	3	
Beerschot	2011–12	Belgian Pro League	19	4	3	0	—		—		22	4	
Monaco	2011–12	Ligue 2	17	0	0	0	0	0	—		17	0	
Monaco	2012–13	Ligue 2	35	3	2	0	0	0	—		37	3	
Monaco	Total		52	3	2	0	0	0	0	0	54	2	—
Valenciennes (loan)	2013–14	Ligue 1	31	0	1	0	1	0	—		33	1	
1860 Munich	2014–15	2. Bundesliga	26	2	1	0	—		2 (Note: Appearances in 2. Bundesliga relegation playoffs)	0	29	2	
1860 Munich	2015–16	2. Bundesliga	32	1	3	0	—		—		35	1	
1860 Munich	Total		58	3	4	0	—		2	0	64	3	—
Maccabi Haifa	2016–17	Israeli Premier League	34	1	1	0	4	0	3 (Note: One appearance in Israeli Super Cup, two appearances in UEFA Europa League)	0	42	1	
Kortrijk	2017–18	Belgian First Division A	14	0	3	0	—		8 (Note: Appearances in Belgian First Division A playoffs)	0	25	0	
Kortrijk	2018–19	Belgian First Division A	28	0	3	0	—		10	0	41	0	
Kortrijk	2019–20	Belgian First Division A	19	2	2	1	—		0	0	21	3	
Kortrijk	Total		61	2	8	1	—		18	0	87	3	—
Peñarol	2020	Uruguayan Primera División	32	2	—		—		7 (Note: Appearances in Copa Libertadores and Copa Sudamericana)	2	39	4	
Peñarol	2021	Uruguayan Primera División	27	1	—		—		14 (Note: Appearances in Copa Sudamericana)	2	41	3	
Peñarol	Total		59	3	—		—		21	4	80	7	—
Club León	2021–22	Liga MX	7	0	0	0	—		2 (Note: Appearances in CONCACAF Champions League)	0	9	0	
Universidad Católica	2022	Chilean Primera División	10	1	3	0	—		—		13	1	
Universidad Católica	2023	Chilean Primera División	22	3	5	0	—		1	0	28	3	
Universidad Católica	2024	Chilean Primera División	19	0	2	0	—		1	0	22	0	
Universidad Católica	Total		51	4	10	0	—		2	0	63	4	—
Montevideo City Torque	2025	Uruguayan Primera División	15	1	0	0	—		0	0	15	1	
Career total			399	23	25	1	5	0	32	0	461	24	—
