= Michael Netolitzky =

German footballer

Personal information
- Date of birth: 12 January 1994 (age 32)
- Place of birth: Bayreuth, Germany
- Height: 1.91 m (6 ft 3 in)
- Position: Goalkeeper

Team information
- Current team: Bayern Munich II (goalkeeping coach)

Youth career
- 2000–2006: FSV Bayreuth
- 2006–2012: 1. FC Nürnberg
- 2012–2013: 1860 Munich

Senior career*
Years	Team	Apps	(Gls)
2012–2016	1860 Munich II	66	(0)
2016–2018	Hallescher FC	1	(0)
2018–2020	Bayern Munich II	0	(0)

Managerial career
- 2020–: Bayern Munich II (goalkeeping coach)
- * Club domestic league appearances and goals

Michael Netolitzky (born 12 January 1994) is a German former footballer who played as a goalkeeper. He works as a goalkeeping coach along with Walter Junghans for Bayern Munich II.

== Career ==
Netolitzky started his career at FSV Bayreuth, then he played for 1. FC Nürnberg, 1860 Munich and Hallescher FC, before joining Bayern Munich II, where he ended his career due to injury.

Afterwards, he became a goalkeeper coach at Bayern Munich women's team.
