= Valdet Rama =

Albanian footballer

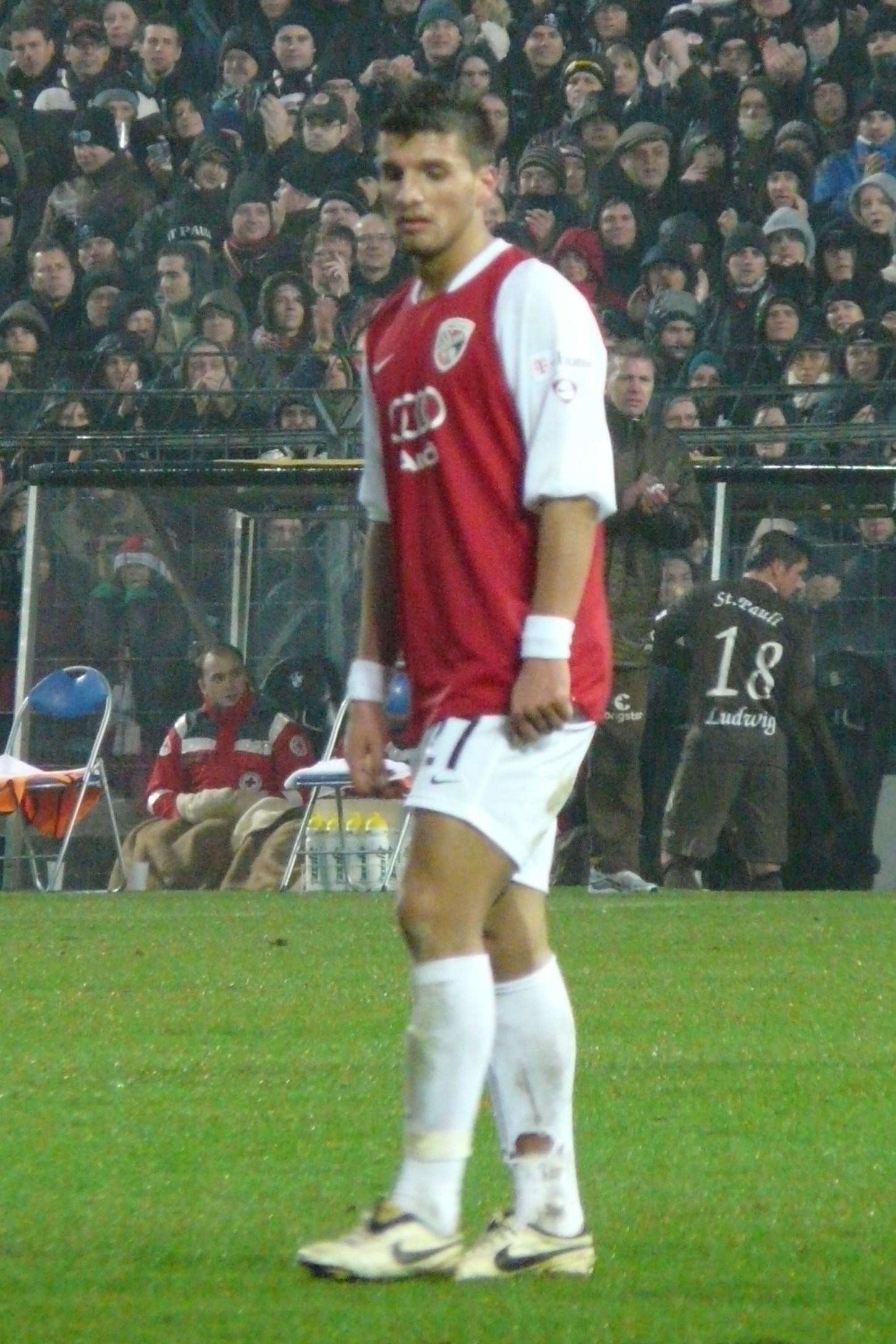
- Rama playing for FC Ingolstadt in 2008

Personal information
- Full name: Valdet Skënder Rama
- Date of birth: 20 November 1987 (age 38)
- Place of birth: Mitrovica, Kosovo
- Height: 1.82 m (6 ft 0 in)
- Position: Midfielder

Youth career
- 2002–2004: SF Oestrich-Iserlohn
- 2004–2005: Rot-Weiss Essen

Senior career*
Years	Team	Apps	(Gls)
2005–2008	VfL Wolfsburg II	58	(10)
2008–2009	FC Ingolstadt	32	(2)
2009–2011	Hannover 96 II	16	(1)
2009–2011	Hannover 96	15	(0)
2011–2013	Örebro	50	(10)
2013–2014	Valladolid	31	(1)
2014–2016	1860 Munich	42	(4)
2016–2017	Würzburger Kickers	28	(2)
2017–2018	Yanbian Funde	7	(0)
2019	Kukësi	10	(2)
2019–2022	SV Meppen	52	(9)
2022–2023	Wuppertaler SV	27	(1)

International career
2013–2015	Albania	15	(3)
- * Club domestic league appearances and goals as of 23:13, 11 June 2024 (UTC)

Valdet Skënder Rama (born 20 November 1987) is a professional footballer who most recently played as a midfielder for German club Wuppertaler SV. Born in Kosovo, he represented Albania internationally.

== Early life ==
Rama is a Kosovo Albanian and fled to Germany at the age of nine years. There he spent his youth in the Ruhr district and went through the ranks of three local clubs before joining former German champions Rot-Weiss Essen in 2004.

== Club career ==
=== Early career ===
Rama made his debut on the professional league level in the 2. Bundesliga for FC Ingolstadt 04 on 17 August 2008 when he started a game against Greuther Fürth. He scored a goal on his debut.

=== Hannover 96 ===
After Ingolstadt was relegated at the end of the 2008–09 season, his contract became invalid and he was able to join a new club on a free transfer. On 26 May 2009, he announced his move to Bundesliga side Hannover 96 where he signed a three-year contract.

=== Örebro ===
In February 2011, he signed for Swedish club Örebro SK. He made a big impact in his first year with the club, scoring eight goals from his position as a winger. During the second season he often found himself benched and his manager criticized his lack of defensive work. This caused his agent to lash out against the club, claiming that Rama was one of the best players in the league and that he had been humiliated by the managers comments. He also demanded that Örebro sell him during the summer. Rama however ended up staying with the club until the end of the 2012 Allsvenskan season, after which Örebro was relegated.

=== Valladolid ===
After the 2012 Allsvenskan season ended, on 31 January 2013 Rama moved Real Valladolid on loan until the end of the 2012–13 La Liga's season. He made his debut on 9 March 2013, in a match against Málaga which finished 1–1 and he came on as a substitute in the 71st minute in place of Daniel Larsson.

His first goal with Valladolid came on 20 January 2014 in a match against Athletic Bilbao, where he scored in the last 90th minute and the match finished in the loss 4–2. With this goal, Rama became the first Albanian player ever to score in La Liga and in the entire Spanish football.

Rama finished the 2013–14 La Liga season with 26 appearances and 1 goal scored. His last match in which he played was early on 27 March 2014 against Real Sociedad and only as substitute in the 61st minute. Then he was called up only in one match on 3 May 2014 against Espanyol and did not play any minute.

On 11 July 2014, Rama left Valladolid as he interrupted his contract with the club, where the contract was valid until 30 June 2015.

=== 1860 Munich ===
On 27 August 2014, Rama had started the medical tests with 2. Bundesliga side TSV 1860 Munich. Two days later, the transfer was made official with Rama joining on a two-year contract.

He made his competitive debut later on 14 September by starting in the week 5 match against St. Pauli which was won 1–2 away. In the next match he provided an assist to rescue his side a point against FC Ingolstadt. Rama's first score-sheet contributions came on 19 October where he scored his team's only goal in the 4–1 loss at Erzgebirge Aue.

He was on the scoresheet also in the DFB-Pokal round 2 tie against SC Freiburg which gave his side the temporary lead as the opponents bounced back to win 5–2, much to 1860 Munich elimination. He finished his first season with Die Löwen by making 28 league appearances, scoring three times.

In the 2015–16 season, Rama declined, scoring only once in 16 league appearances. His season was also marred by injuries. Following the end of the season, Rama's contract was not extended and left as a free agent. He described his spell with the club as "difficult" due to injuries.

=== Yanbian Funde ===
Rama transferred to Chinese Super League side Yanbian Funde on a two-year contract in July 2017. He made his debut on 13 August in a 1–1 draw against Changchun Yatai

=== Kukësi ===
On 31 January 2019, after more than a year without a club, Rama joined Albanian Superliga side Kukësi on a six-month contract with an option to renew for one more year; his monthly wage was reportedly €9,000, excluding bonuses.

He won his first trophy with Kukësi on 2 June following the 2–1 win at Elbasan Arena against Tirana in the Albanian Cup final. He participated in the build up that led to both two goals of his side, earning him praise from the media.

=== SV Meppen ===
On 20 August 2019, SV Meppen announced the signing of Rama on a two-year deal with an option for a third year. Having made three substitute appearances in the 2021–22 season he agreed the termination of his contract in January 2022.

=== Wuppertaler SV ===
On 3 January 2022, Rama joined Wuppertaler SV in the fourth-tier Regionalliga West.

== International career ==
As soon as Rama moved to Spain to play in La Liga he declared that he was eager to play for Albania and was contacted by the Albanian Football Association in order to plan a call-up for the next matches. On 25 March 2013 he received the Albanian citizenship and became fully eligible to play for Albania.

He made his international debut on 26 March 2013 in a friendly match against Lithuania finished in the victory 4–1, where Rama played as a starter and substituted off in the 64th minute with Armando Vajushi. On 7 June 2013, he scored first goal against Norway finished in the 1–1 draw. He finished first year (2013) with Albania making a total of 8 appearances, all as a starter, and substituted off 3 times. In those 8 appearances he also scored 3 goals.

In August 2016, Rama opted to play for newly recognized Kosovo national team. However, in an interview in September 2017, Rama didn't exclude the opportunity to play for Albania once again.

== Personal life ==
Rama was born in Mitrovicë, in what was then SFR Yugoslavia, and is of Albanian ethnicity. He is a cousin of Bujar Rama, a Kosovan footballer who has played for Trepça in the Superleague of Kosovo.

== Career statistics ==
=== Club ===
As of 3 January 2022

Appearances and goals by club, season and competition
Club	Season	League			Cup		Europe		Total	
Club	Season	Division	Apps	Goals	Apps	Goals	Apps	Goals	Apps	Goals
VfL Wolfsburg II	2005–06	Oberliga Nord	15	4	0	0	—		15	4
VfL Wolfsburg II	2006–07	Oberliga Nord	15	6	0	0	—		15	6
VfL Wolfsburg II	2007–08	Regionalliga Nord	35	0	0	0	—		35	0
VfL Wolfsburg II	Total		65	10	0	0	—		65	10
Ingolstadt 04	2008–19	2. Bundesliga	32	2	0	0	—		32	2
Hannover 96	2009–10	Bundesliga	15	0	1	0	—		16	0
Hannover 96 II	2009–10	Regionalliga Nord	6	0	0	0	—		0	0
Hannover 96 II	2010–11	Regionalliga Nord	10	1	0	0	—		10	1
Hannover 96 II	Total		16	1	0	0	—		16	1
Örebro	2011	Allsvenskan	29	8	0	0	2 (Note: Appearance in UEFA Europa League)	0	31	8
Örebro	2012	Allsvenskan	21	2	0	0	—		23	2
Örebro	Total		50	10	0	0	2	0	52	10
Real Valladolid	2012–13	La Liga	5	0	0	0	—		5	0
Real Valladolid	2013–14	La Liga	26	1	0	0	—		26	1
Real Valladolid	Total		16	1	0	0	—		16	1
1860 Munich	2014–15	2. Bundesliga	28	3	1	1	—		29	4
1860 Munich	2015–16	2. Bundesliga	16	1	0	0	—		16	1
1860 Munich	Total		44	4	1	1	—		45	5
Würzburger Kickers	2016–17	2. Bundesliga	28	2	1	0	—		29	2
Yanbian Funde	2017	Chinese Super League	7	0	0	0	—		7	0
Kukësi	2018–19	Albanian Superliga	10	2	5	1	2	0	17	3
SV Meppen	2019–20	3. Liga	24	6	0	0	–		24	6
SV Meppen	2020–21	3. Liga	25	3	0	0	–		25	3
SV Meppen	2020–21	3. Liga	3	0	0	0	–		3	0
SV Meppen	Total		52	9	0	0	—		52	9
Career total			348	41	8	2	4	0	360	43

=== International ===
As of match played 13 June 2015

Appearances and goals by national team and year
National team	Year	Apps	Goals
Albania	2013	8	3
Albania	2014	6	0
Albania	2015	1	0
Total		15	3

International goals
Scores and results list Albania's goal tally first, score column indicates score after each Rama goal.

List of international goals scored by Valdet Rama
No.	Date	Venue	Cap	Opponent	Score	Result	Competition
1	7 June 2013	Qemal Stafa Stadium, Tirana, Albania	2	Norway	1–0	1–1	2014 FIFA World Cup qualification
2	14 August 2013	Qemal Stafa Stadium, Tirana, Albania	3	Armenia	1–0	2–0	Friendly
3	10 September 2013	Laugardalsvöllur, Reykjavík, Iceland	5	Iceland	1–0	1–2	2014 FIFA World Cup qualification
