= Stephan Hain =

German footballer (born 1988)

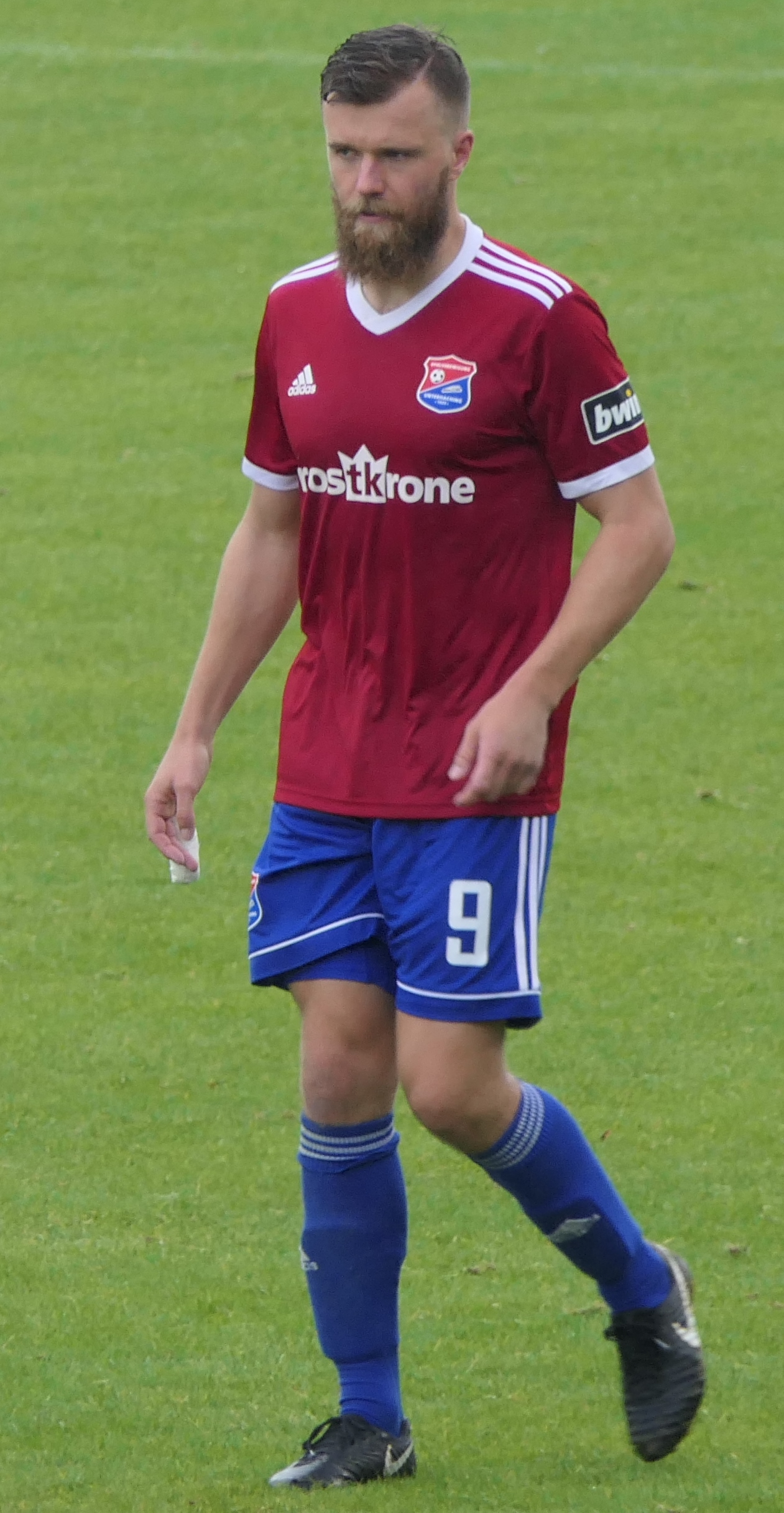
- Hain playing for SpVgg Unterhaching in 2018

Personal information
- Date of birth: 27 September 1988 (age 38)
- Place of birth: Zwiesel, West Germany
- Height: 1.78 m (5 ft 10 in)
- Position: Striker

Youth career
- 1995–2000: SV 1922 Zwiesel
- 2000–2001: TSV Lindberg
- 2001–2007: SpVgg Ruhmannsfelden

Senior career*
Years	Team	Apps	(Gls)
2007–2013	FC Augsburg	75	(16)
2013	FC Augsburg II	4	(1)
2013–2016	1860 Munich	25	(1)
2015–2016	1860 Munich II	4	(2)
2016–2023	SpVgg Unterhaching	158	(86)
2023	Manukau United	1	(0)
Total		267	(106)
- * Club domestic league appearances and goals

Stephan Hain (born 27 September 1988) is a German former professional footballer who played as a striker. A prolific goalscorer, Hain became top goalscorer of the 2016–17 Regionalliga season, netting 32 goals in 28 appearances for SpVgg Unterhaching.

== Career ==
=== Early years ===
Hain was born in Zwiesel, Bavaria, and started playing football for hometown club SV 1922 Zwiesel, before moving to TSV Lindberg where he played for a year and a half. In November 2001, he moved to SpVgg Ruhmannsfelden, where he spent six years playing at youth level.

=== FC Augsburg ===
In the summer of 2007, Hain moved to FC Augsburg. He made his senior debut on 21 October 2007, starting in the 2. Bundesliga match against Erzgebirge Aue before being replaced by Anton Makarenko in the 62nd minute of a 3–0 away loss. He would go on to play more frequently during the 2009–10 season, scoring three goals in 16 games. In the first half of the 2010–11 season, he improved his goal tally and made it into the starting lineup. During the 2010–11 winter break, Hain extended his contract until 2013. He scored the winning 2–1 goal against FSV Frankfurt on 8 May 2011 which secured Augsburg's promotion to the Bundesliga. On 28 January 2012, in a game against 1. FC Kaiserslautern, he scored 20 seconds after coming on as a substitute. This became the fastest goal scored for a substitute in the Bundesliga, equalling the record set by Dave Mitchell in 1986.

=== 1860 Munich ===
On 21 May 2013, Hain joined 2. Bundesliga club 1860 Munich. He scored his first goal for the club on 18 April 2015, the winner in added time in a home game against VfL Bochum. Hain's contract expired in June 2016 and was not renewed.

=== SpVgg Unterhaching ===
Hain moved to Regionalliga Bayern club SpVgg Unterhaching on 28 July 2016. He ended his first season as the top goalscorer of the league, scoring 32 goals in 28 league games, which contributed to Unterhaching's return to the 3. Liga. In the 3. Liga, Hain continued his goal scoring form, netting 19 goals in 37 league games in the 2017–18 season and finishing shared second in the top scorers list, three behind Manuel Schäffler. In January 2019, he extended his contract with Unterhaching until 2023.

He suffered successive injuries during the 2021–22 and 2022–23 seasons, including an anterior cruciate ligament injury, which sidelined him for an extended period.

In July 2023, after winning the Regionalliga Bayern in the 2022–23 season, he retired from professional football and relocated to New Zealand with his family to pursue a new professional career.

== Honours ==
SpVgg Unterhaching

- Regionalliga Bayern: 2022–23
