= 2011–12 TSV 1860 Munich season =

1860 Munich
2011–12 season
- Stadium: Allianz Arena
- 2. Bundesliga: 6th
- DFB-Pokal: Second round

The 2011–12 TSV 1860 Munich season started on 17 July 2011 and finished on 6 May 2012. 1860 Munich finished the 2011–12 2. Bundesliga in sixth place and were eliminated in the second round of the 2011–12 DFB-Pokal.

== Competitions ==
=== 2. Bundesliga ===
==== 2. Bundesliga review ====
===== July =====
1860 Munich started their season on 17 July 2011 with a 3–1 loss to Eintracht Braunschweig in the 2. Bundesliga. Kevin Volland scored for 1860 Munich. Dennis Kruppke, Nico Zimmermann, and Domi Kumbela scored for Eintracht Braunschweig. Stefan Buck was sent–off during the match. 1860 Munich finished matchday one in 16th place. On 23 July 2011, 1860 Munich's first home match was against Karlsruher SC. 1860 Munich won the match 2–1 with goals from Christopher Schindler and Stefan Aigner. 1860 Munich finished matchday two in 10th place.

===== August =====
1860 Munich started August with a 5–0 win against Energie Cottbus in Cottbus. 1860 Munich got goals from Stefan Aigner, Kevin Volland, Daniel Halfar, an own goal from Uwe Hünemeier, and a goal from Benjamin Lauth. Sebastian Maier made his 2. Bundesliga debut. 1860 Munich finished matchday three in fourth place. on 14 August 2011, 1860 Munich defeated Erzgebirge Aue 4–0 with two goals from Daniel Halfar and a goal each from Benjamin Lauth and Manuel Schäffler. 1860 Munich finished matchday four in second place. On 19 August 2011 (matchday five), 1860 Munich lost 3–1 to Fortuna Düsseldorf. Benjamin Lauth scored from a penalty shot for 1860 Munich and Fortuna Düsseldorf got goals from Sascha Rösler, who scored from a penalty shot, Andreas Lambertz, and Maximilian Beister. 1860 Munich finished matchday five in seventh place. 1860 Munich finished August with a 3–1 win against Union Berlin on 28 August 2011 (matchday six). 1860 Munich got two goals from Kevin Volland and a goal from Stefan Aigner and Union Berlin got their goal from John Mosquera. 1860 Munich finished matchday six in fifth place.

===== September =====
1860 Munich started September with a 4–2 loss to FC St. Pauli, which took place on 11 September 2011 (matchday seven). 1860 Munich took a 2–0 lead with a penalty shot from Benjamin Lauth and an own goal from Kevin Schindler. However, FC St. Pauli got a goal from Marius Ebbers, a goal from Sebastian Schachten, and two goals from Max Kruse to win 4–2. 1860 Munich dropped down to seventh place. On 18 September 2011 (matchday eight), 1860 Munich defeated FSV Frankfurt 4–0 with a goal from Stefan Aigner, two goals from Kevin Volland and an own goal from Alexander Huber. 1860 Munich moved up to sixth place. The 125th Bavarian Derby took place on 25 September 2011 (matchday nine). 1860 Munich lost 2–0 to Greuther Fürth. Christopher Nöthe and Bernd Nehrig scored for Greuther Fürth. Kai Bülow (1860 Munich) was sent–off during the match. 1860 Munich finished matchday nine in sixth place.

===== October =====
1860 Munich started October with a 4–2 loss to Dynamo Dresden. The match took place on 2 October 2011. Daniel Bierofka scored both of 1860 Munich's season. Dynamo Dresden got three goals from Mickael Poté and a goal from Romain Bregerie. With the win, Dynamo Dresden picked up their first 3 points away from home. Stefan Buck was sent–off. 1860 Munich finished matchday 10 in seventh place. 1860 Munich faced Hansa Rostock on 14 October 2011. Hansa Rostock defeated 1860 Munich 2–0. Dominic Peitz and Matthias Holst scored for Hansa Rostock. 1860 Munich dropped down to ninth place. On 21 October 2011, the match between 1860 Munich and SC Paderborn 07 finished in a 1–1 draw. Kevin Volland scored for 1860 Munich and Florian Mohr for SC Paderborn 07. 1860 Munich finished matchday 12 by remaining in ninth place. 1860 Munich finished October with a 3–0 win against MSV Duisburg. The match took place on 30 October 2011. Daniel Bierofka, Sandro Kaiser, and Kevin Volland scored for 1860 Munich. The win for 1860 Munich finished their four–match winless streak. 1860 Munich finished matchday 13 by moving up to seventh place.

===== November =====
On 5 November 2011, 1860 Munich started November with a 3–1 loss to VfL Bochum. Benjamin Lauth scored for 1860 Munich. Lauth also missed scoring from a penalty kick. VfL Bochum got a goal from Takashi Inui, an own goal from Collin Benjamin, and a goal from Mirkan Aydin. 1860 Munich finished matchday 14 in eighth place. On 18 November 2011, 1860 Munich started a Nine–match undefeated streak with a 1–0 win against FC Ingolstadt 04. Đorđe Rakić scored the goal for 1860 Munich. 1860 Munich finished matchday 15 in sixth place. On 26 November 2011, 1860 Munich defeated Eintracht Frankfurt 2–1. Anderson Soares de Oliveira scored an own goal in the first minute that put 1860 Munich ahead. Kevin Volland scored the second goal for 1860 Munich. Theofanis Gekas scored for Eintracht Frankfurt. The win against Eintracht Frankfurt finished their undefeated streak to start the season. 1860 Munich remained in sixth place.

===== December =====
On 4 December 2011, 1860 Munich faced Alemannia Aachen at New Tivoli in Aachen. Stefan Buck and Stefan Aigner scored for 1860 Munich. Sergiu Radu and Bas Sibum scored for Alemannia Aachen. 1860 Munich dropped down to eighth place. On 9 December 2011, 1860 Munich faced Eintracht Braunschweig at the Allianz Arena in Munich. 1860 Munich won 3–0 with goals from Stefan Aigner, Đorđe Rakić, and Benjamin Lauth. This was 1860 Munich's fourth match without defeat. 1860 Munich finished matchday 18 in seventh place. 1860 Munich faced Karlsruher SC on 17 December 2011 at Wildparkstadion in Karlsruhe. 1860 Munich won the match 3–1. Stefan Aigner got two goals from Daniel Bierofka, including one from a penalty kick, and a goal from Stefan Aigner. This was their fourth win in five matches and their final match of 2011. Timo Ochs played in goal against Karlsruher SC, which was his only match in either the 2. Bundesliga or DFB-Pokal. 1860 Munich finished in sixth place on matchday 19.

===== February =====
On 6 February 2011, 1860 Munich faced Energie Cottbus at the Allianz Arena in Munich. 1860 Munich won 2–0 with two goals from Benjamin Lauth. This was 1860 Munich's first competitive match of 2012. 1860 Munich also extended their undefeated streak to six matches. 1860 Munich remained in sixth place. The away match against Erzgebirge Aue on matchday 21 was supposed to be the next match for 1860 Munich. However, it was postponed until 14 March 2011. Matchday 22 against Fortuna Düsseldorf happened on 19 February 2012 at Allianz Arena in Munich. 1860 Munich defeated Fortuna Düsseldorf 2–1. Stefan Aigner and Necat Aygün scored for 1860 Munich and Maximilian Beister scored for Fortuna Düsseldorf. 1860 Munich handed Fortuna Düsseldorf their first loss away from their home stadium in Düsseldorf. 1860 Munich finished matchday 22 in sixth place. On 24 February 2012, 1860 Munich faced Union Berlin at Stadion An der Alten Försterei in Berlin. 1860 Munich won the match 1–0 with a goal from Stefan Aigner. 1860 Munich remained in sixth place.

===== March =====
1860 Munich started March with a 1–1 draw against FC St. Pauli. The match took place on 5 March 2012 at the Allianz Arena in Munich. The match finished in a 1–1 draw. Kevin Volland scored for 1860 Munich and Florian Bruns, who scored from a penalty kick, scored for FC St. Pauli. 1860 Munich remained in sixth place. 1860 Munich faced FSV Frankfurt on 10 March 2012 at PSD Bank Arena in Frankfurt. Kai Bülow scored for 1860 Munich. Michael Görlitz, Marcel Gaus, and Macauley Chrisantus scored for FSV Frankfurt. The loss finished their nine–match undefeated streak. 1860 Munich finished matchday 10 in sixth place. 1860 Munich faced Erzgebirge Aue on 14 March 2012 at Erzgebirgsstadion in Aue. the match finished in a 0–0 draw. 1860 Munich remained in sixth place. 1860 Munich faced Greuther Fürth on 17 March 2012 at Allianz Arena in Munich. 1860 Munich lost the match 4–1. Daniel Bierofka scored from a penalty kick for 1860 Munich. Greuther Fürth got two goals from Olivier Occean and goals from Stephan Fürstner and Felix Klaus. 1860 Munich remained in sixth place. 1860 Munich faced Dynamo Dresden on 23 March 2012 at Glücksgas-Stadion in Dresden. 1860 Munich won 1–0 with a goal from Benjamin Lauth. 1860 Munich remained in sixth place. 1860 Munich faced Hansa Rostock on 31 March 2012 at Allianz Arena in Munich. Hansa Rostock won 1–0 with a goal from Freddy Borg. 1860 Munich remained in sixth place.

===== April and May =====
1860 Munich started April with a 2–2 draw against SC Paderborn 07. The match took place on 8 April 2012 at Energieteam-Arena in Paderborn. Đorđe Rakić and Kevin Volland scored for 1860 Munich. Nick Proschwitz and Enis Alushi scored for SC Paderborn 07. 1860 Munich remained in sixth place. 1860 Munich faced MSV Duisburg on 11 April 2012 at Allianz Arena in Munich. 1860 Munich won the match 2–1. Guillermo Vallori and Benjamin Lauth scored for 1860 Munich and Emil Jula. The win for 1860 Munich finished MSV Duisburg's five–match undefeated streak. 1860 Munich finished matchday 30 in sixth place. 1860 Munich faced VfL Bochum on 15 April 2012 at Rewirpower-Stadion in Bochum. The match finished in a 2–2 draw. Đorđe Rakić and Benjamin Lauth scored for 1860 Munich and Daniel Ginczek and Kevin Vogt scored for VfL Bochum. 1860 Munich remained in sixth place. 1860 Munich faced FC Ingolstadt 04 on 21 April 2012 at the Allianz Arena in Munich. 1860 Munich won the match 4–1. 1860 Munich got two goals from Kevin Volland and a goal each from Stefan Aigner and Dominik Stahl. Stefan Leitl scored for FC Ingolstadt 04. 1860 Munich finished matchday 32 in sixth place. 1860 Munich faced Eintracht Frankfurt on 29 April 2012 at Commerzbank-Arena in Frankfurt. 1860 Munich won 2–0 with an own goal from Sebastian Jung and a goal from Guillermo Vallori. 1860 Munich finished matchday 33 in sixth place. 1860 Munich finished the 2. Bundesliga season with a 2–1 loss to Alemannia Aachen. The match took place 6 May 2012 at Allianz Arena in Munich. Stefan Aigner scored for 1860 Munich and Albert Streit and Alper Uludag scored for Alemannia Aachen. 1860 Munich finished the 2011–12 season in sixth place.

==== 2. Bundesliga results ====
Date	Opponent	Venue H/A	Results F–A	Goalscorer(s)	Attendance	Pos.	Ref.
17 July 2011	Eintracht Braunschweig	A	1–3	Volland	22,167	16th	
23 July 2011	Karlsruher SC	H	2–1	Schindler, Aigner	26,600	10th	
6 August 2011	Energie Cottbus	A	5–0	Aigner, Volland, Halfar, Hünemeier (O.G.), Lauth	11,220	4th	
14 August 2011	Erzgebirge Aue	H	4–0	Halfar (2), Lauth, Schäffler	24,600	2nd	
19 August 2011	Fortuna Düsseldorf	A	1–3	Lauth (Pen.)	28,300	7th	
28 August 2011	Union Berlin	H	3–1	Volland (2), Aigner	22,500	5th	
11 September 2011	FC St. Pauli	A	2–4	Lauth (Pen.), Schindler (O.G.)	24,487	7th	
18 September 2011	FSV Frankfurt	H	4–0	Aigner, Volland (2), Huber (O.G.)	20,100	6th	
25 September 2011	Greuther Fürth	A	0–2	—	14,200	6th	
2 October 2011	Dynamo Dresden	H	2–4	Bierofka (2)	39,500	7th	
14 October 2011	Hansa Rostock	A	0–2	—	14,700	11th	
21 October 2011	SC Paderborn 07	H	1–1	Volland	15,100	9th	
30 October 2011	MSV Duisburg	A	3–0	Bierofka, Kaiser, Volland	11,387	7th	
5 November 2011	VfL Bochum	H	1–3	Lauth	18,300	8th	
18 November 2011	FC Ingolstadt 04	A	1–0	Rakić	13,850	6th	
26 November 2011	Eintracht Frankfurt	H	2–1	Anderson (O.G.), Volland	30,660	6th	
4 December 2011	Alemannia Aachen	A	2–2	Buck, Aigner	17,023	8th	
9 December 2011	Eintracht Braunschweig	H	3–0	Aigner, Rakić, Lauth	16,400	6th	
17 December 2011	Karlsruher SC	A	3–1	Bierofka (2, Pen.), Aigner	12,640	6th	
6 February 2012	Energie Cottbus	H	2–0	Lauth (2)	14,600	6th	
19 February 2012	Fortuna Düsseldorf	H	2–1	Aigner, Aygün	21,400	6th	
24 February 2012	Union Berlin	A	1–0	Aigner	15,723	6th	
5 March 2012	FC St. Pauli	H	1–1	Volland	31,600	6th	
10 March 2012	FSV Frankfurt	A	1–3	Bülow	6,019	6th	
14 March 2012	Erzgebirge Aue	A	0–0	—	7,500	6th	
17 March 2012	Greuther Fürth	H	1–4	Bierofka (Pen.)	29,600	6th	
23 March 2012	Dynamo Dresden	A	1–0	Lauth	29,323	6th	
31 March 2012	Hansa Rostock	H	0–1	—	17,700	6th	
8 April 2012	SC Paderborn 07	A	2–2	Rakić, Volland	11,466	6th	
11 April 2012	MSV Duisburg	H	2–1	Vallori, Lauth	14,400	6th	
15 April 2012	VfL Bochum	A	2–2	Rakić, Lauth	10,132	6th	
21 April 2012	FC Ingolstadt 04	H	4–1	Volland (2), Aigner, Stahl	21,200	6th	
29 April 2012	Eintracht Frankfurt	A	2–0	Jung (O.G.), Vallori	50,800	6th	
6 May 2012	Alemannia Aachen	H	1–2	Aigner	25,100	6th	

==== League table ====
Pos	Team	Pld	W	D	L	GF	GA	GD	Pts
4	FC St. Pauli	34	18	8	8	59	34	+25	62
5	SC Paderborn	34	17	10	7	51	42	+9	61
6	1860 Munich	34	17	6	11	62	46	+16	57
7	Union Berlin	34	14	6	14	55	58	−3	48
8	Eintracht Braunschweig	34	10	15	9	37	35	+2	45

Source: kicker
Rules for classification: 1) points; 2) goal difference; 3) number of goals scored.

==== Results summary ====
Overall								Home						Away					
Pld	W	D	L	GF	GA	GD	Pts	W	D	L	GF	GA	GD	W	D	L	GF	GA	GD
34	17	6	11	62	46	+16	57	10	2	5	35	22	+13	7	4	6	27	24	+3

Last updated: 6 May 2012.
Source: 2. Bundesliga results

=== DFB-Pokal ===
==== DFB-Pokal review ====
1860 Munich were eliminated in the second round of the DFB-Pokal. In the first round, 1860 Munich defeated VfL Osnabrück 3–2 in extra time. 1860 Munich got two goals from Benjamin Lauth, including one from the penalty spot, and a goal from Kevin Volland. In the second round, 1860 Munich lost 3–0 to Fortuna Düsseldorf. Collin Benjamin was sent–off during the match.

==== DFB-Pokal results ====
Date	Round	Opponent	Venue Home/Away	Result F–A	Goalscorers	Attendance	Ref.
29 July 2011	First round	VfL Osnabrück	A	3–2	Lauth (2), Volland	11,000	
25 October 2011	Second round	Fortuna Düsseldorf	A	0–3	—	34,413	

=== Overall record ===
Competition	First match	Last match	Starting round	Final position	Record							
Competition	First match	Last match	Starting round	Final position	Pld	W	D	L	GF	GA	GD	Win %
2. Bundesliga	17 July 2011	6 May 2012	Matchday 1	Sixth	34	17	6	11	62	46	+16	50.00
DFB-Pokal	29 July 2011	25 October 2011	First round	Second round	2	1	0	1	3	5	−2	50.00
Total					36	18	6	12	65	51	+14	50.00

Source: Competitions

== Roster and statistics ==
=== Roster, appearances, and goals ===
==== Roster, appearances, and goals ====
Roster, appearances, and goals
Player	Total		2. Bundesliga		DFB-Pokal	
Player	Apps.	Gls.	Apps.	Gls.	Apps.	Gls.
Gpalkeepers
Vitus Eicher	1	0	1	0	0	0
Gabor Kiraly	34	0	32	0	2	0
Timo Ochs	1	0	1	0	0	0
Defenders
Necat Aygün	19	1	19	1	0	0
Stefan Buck	21	1	21	1	0	0
Arne Feick	22	0	20	0	2	0
Jonatan Kotzke	1	0	1	0	0	0
Dennis Malura	4	0	3	0	1	0
Antonio Rukavina	33	0	31	0	2	0
Christopher Schindler	32	1	30	1	2	0
Phillipp Steinhart	1	0	1	0	0	0
Guillermo Vallori	11	2	11	2	0	0
Midfielders
Stefan Aigner	32	11	30	11	2	0
Collin Benjamin	20	0	18	0	2	0
Daniel Bierofka	33	6	31	6	2	0
Kai Bülow	30	1	28	1	2	0
Daniel Halfar	19	3	18	3	1	0
Sandro Kaiser	10	1	10	1	0	0
Sebastian Maier	15	0	15	0	0	0
Maximilian Nicu	15	0	15	0	0	0
Dominik Stahl	30	1	28	1	2	0
Forwards
Benjamin Lauth	35	13	33	11	2	2
Đorđe Rakić	25	4	24	4	1	0
Manuel Schäffler	15	3	14	3	1	0
Kevin Volland	35	14	33	13	2	1
Bobby Wood	4	0	3	0	1	0

==== Goalscorers ====
Goalscorers in all competitions
Player	Goals
Kevin Volland	14
Benjamin Lauth	13
Stefan Aigner	11
Daniel Bierofka	6
Own goals	5
Đorđe Rakić	4
Manuel Schäffler	3
Daniel Halfar	3
Guillermo Vallori	2
Jonatan Kotzke	1
Christopher Schindler	1
Kai Bülow	1
Sandro Kaiser	1
Dominik Stahl	1
Necat Aygün	1
Stefan Buck	1

2. Bundesliga goalscorers
Player	Goals
Kevin Volland	13
Benjamin Lauth	11
Stefan Aigner	11
Daniel Bierofka	6
Own goals	5
Đorđe Rakić	4
Manuel Schäffler	3
Daniel Halfar	3
Guillermo Vallori	2
Jonatan Kotzke	1
Christopher Schindler	1
Kai Bülow	1
Sandro Kaiser	1
Dominik Stahl	1
Necat Aygün	1
Stefan Buck	1

DFB-Pokal goalscorers
Player	Goals
Benjamin Lauth	2
Kevin Volland	1

==== Own goals ====
Own goals by 1860 Munich players
No.	Player	Competition	Date	Opponent	Final score	Ref.
1	Collin Benjamin	2. Bundesliga	5 November 2011	VfL Bochum	1–3	

Own goals by opposing players
No.	Player	Competition	Date	Team	Final score	Ref.
1	Uwe Hünemeier	2. Bundesliga	6 August 2011	Energie Cottbus	5–0	
2	Kevin Schindler	2. Bundesliga	11 September 2011	FC St. Pauli	2–4	
3	Alexander Huber	2. Bundesliga	18 September 2011	FSV Frankfurt	4–0	
4	Anderson Soares de Oliveira	2. Bundesliga	26 November 2011	Eintracht Frankfurt	2–1	
5	Sebastian Jung	2. Bundesliga	29 April 2012	Eintracht Frankfurt	2–0	

=== Other statistics ===
==== Discipline ====
Player	Total		
Player	Yellow card	(yellow card) (red card)	Red card
Daniel Bierofka	10	0	0
Kevin Volland	8	0	0
Kai Bülow	6	0	2
Christopher Schindler	6	0	0
Dominik Stahl	6	0	0
Necat Aygün	5	0	0
Arne Feick	5	0	0
Stefan Aigner	5	0	0
Guillermo Vallori	4	0	0
Benjamin Lauth	4	0	0
Stefan Buck	1	1	1
Gabor Kiraly	3	0	0
Collin Benjamin	1	0	1
Daniel Halfar	2	0	0
Sandro Kaiser	2	0	0
Antonio Rukavina	2	0	0
Đorđe Rakić	2	0	0
Dennis Malura	1	0	0
Sebastian Maier	1	0	0
Manuel Schäffler	1	0	0
Totals	75	1	4

Player	2. Bundesliga			Ref.
Player	Yellow card	(yellow card) (red card)	Red card	Ref.
Daniel Bierofka	10	0	0	
Kevin Volland	7	0	0	
Kai Bülow	6	0	2	
Dominik Stahl	6	0	0	
Christopher Schindler	5	0	0	
Necat Aygün	5	0	0	
Stefan Aigner	5	0	0	
Arne Feick	4	0	0	
Guillermo Vallori	4	0	0	
Benjamin Lauth	4	0	0	
Stefan Buck	1	1	1	
Gabor Kiraly	2	0	0	
Daniel Halfar	2	0	0	
Sandro Kaiser	2	0	0	
Antonio Rukavina	2	0	0	
Đorđe Rakić	2	0	0	
Collin Benjamin	1	0	0	
Sebastian Maier	1	0	0	
Manuel Schäffler	1	0	0	
Totals	70	1	3	—

Player	DFB-Pokal			Ref.
Player	Yellow card	(yellow card) (red card)	Red card	Ref.
Kevin Volland	1	0	0	
Christopher Schindler	1	0	0	
Arne Feick	1	0	0	
Gabor Kiraly	1	0	0	
Collin Benjamin	0	0	1	
Dennis Malura	1	0	0	
Totals	5	0	1	—

==== Clean sheets ====
Clean sheets
No.	Goalkeeper	Competition	Opponent	Final score	Ref.
1	Gabor Kiraly	2. Bundesliga	Energie Cottbus	5–0	
2	Gabor Kiraly	2. Bundesliga	Erzgebirge Aue	4–0	
3	Gabor Kiraly	2. Bundesliga	FSV Frankfurt	4–0	
4	Gabor Kiraly	2. Bundesliga	MSV Duisburg	3–0	
5	Gabor Kiraly	2. Bundesliga	FC Ingolstadt 04	1–0	
6	Gabor Kiraly	2. Bundesliga	Eintracht Braunschweig	3–0	
7	Gabor Kiraly	2. Bundesliga	Energie Cottbus	2–0	
8	Gabor Kiraly	2. Bundesliga	Union Berlin	1–0	
9	Gabor Kiraly	2. Bundesliga	Erzgebirge Aue	0–0	
10	Gabor Kiraly	2. Bundesliga	Dynamo Dresden	1–0	
11	Vitus Eicher	2. Bundesliga	Eintracht Frankfurt	2–0	
10 clean sheets for Gabor Kiraly and one clean sheet for Vitus Eicher.

==== Minutes played ====
Minutes played in all competitions
Rank	Players	Minutes played
1	Gabor Kiraly	3,090
2	Kevin Volland	2,951
3	Antonio Rukavina	2,895
4	Benjamin Lauth	2,885
5	Christopher Schindler	2,611
6	Stefan Aigner	2,542
7	Daniel Bierofka	2,472
8	Kai Bülow	2,448
9	Dominik Stahl	1,941
10	Stefan Buck	1,631
11	Đorđe Rakić	1,623
12	Arne Feick	1,605
13	Necat Aygün	1,598
14	Daniel Halfar	1,110
15	Collin Benjamin	1,013
16	Maximilian Nicu	973
17	Guillermo Vallori	959
18	Sandro Kaiser	393
19	Manuel Schäffler	291
20	Sebastian Maier	259
21	Dennis Malura	234
22	Vitus Eicher	90
22	Timo Ochs	90
24	Phillipp Steinhart	40
25	Bobby Wood	35
26	Jonatan Kotzke	22

2. Bundesliga
Rank	Players	Minutes played
1	Gabor Kiraly	2,880
2	Kevin Volland	2,747
3	Antonio Rukavina	2,731
4	Benjamin Lauth	2,675
5	Christopher Schindler	2,401
6	Daniel Bierofka	2,334
7	Stefan Aigner	2,332
8	Kai Bülow	2,238
9	Dominik Stahl	1,753
10	Stefan Buck	1,631
11	Đorđe Rakić	1,617
12	Necat Aygün	1,598
13	Arne Feick	1,395
14	Daniel Halfar	1,004
15	Maximilian Nicu	973
16	Guillermo Vallori	959
17	Collin Benjamin	851
18	Sandro Kaiser	393
19	Manuel Schäffler	277
20	Sebastian Maier	259
21	Dennis Malura	188
22	Vitus Eicher	90
22	Timo Ochs	90
24	Phillipp Steinhart	40
25	Jonatan Kotzke	22
26	Bobby Wood	13

DFB-Pokal
Rank	Players	Minutes played
1	Gabor Kiraly	210
1	Benjamin Lauth	210
1	Christopher Schindler	210
1	Stefan Aigner	210
1	Kai Bülow	210
1	Arne Feick	210
7	Kevin Volland	204
8	Dominik Stahl	188
9	Antonio Rukavina	164
10	Collin Benjamin	162
11	Daniel Bierofka	138
12	Daniel Halfar	106
13	Dennis Malura	46
14	Bobby Wood	22
15	Manuel Schäffler	14
16	Đorđe Rakić	6

=== Transfers ===
Transferred in
Pos.	Name	Age	EU	Moving from	Transfer Window
Midfielder	Eke Uzoma	21	No	Arminia Bielefeld	Summer
Forward	Manuel Schäffler	22	Yes	MSV Duisburg	Summer
Goalkeeper	Timo Ochs	29	Yes	1. FC Nürnberg	Summer
Defender	Dennis Malura	27	Yes	Rot-Weiß Erfurt	Summer
Midfielder	Jonatan Kotzke	21	Yes	1. FC Nürnberg II	Summer
Midfielder	Sandro Kaiser	21	Yes	Arminia Bielefeld	Summer
Defender	Arne Feick	23	Yes	Arminia Bielefeld	Summer
Defender	Collin Benjamin	32	No	Hamburger SV	Summer
Defender	Guillermo Vallori	29	Yes	Grasshopper Club Zürich	Winter
Midfielder	Maximilian Nicu	29	Yes	SC Freiburg	Winter

Transferred Out
Pos.	Name	Age	EU	Moving to	Transfer Window
Goalkeeper	Philipp Tschauner	25	Yes	FC St. Pauli	Summer
Defender	Julian Ratei	22	Yes	SV Darmstadt 98	Summer
Midfielder	Alexander Ludwig	27	Yes	Energie Cottbus	Summer
Midfielder	Florin Lovin	29	Yes	AO Kerkyra	Summer
Midfielder	Aleksandar Ignjovski	20	No	Werder Bremen	Summer
Midfielder	Tarık Çamdal	20	Yes	Eskişehirspor	Summer
Midfielder	Stefan Bell	19	Yes	Eintracht Frankfurt	Summer
Forward	Korbinian Vollmann	17	Yes	SpVgg Unterhaching	Summer
Forward	Manuel Schäffler	22	Yes	FC Ingolstadt 04	Winter
Defender	Dennis Malura	27	Yes	1. FC Heidenheim 1846	Winter

== Coaching staff ==
Position	Coach
Head coach:	Reiner Maurer
Assistant coach:	Wolfgang Schellenberg
Assistant coach:	Alexander Schmidt
Goalkeeping coach:	Jürgen Wittmann
