= 2012–13 TSV 1860 Munich season =

TSV 1860 Munich
2012–13 season
- Chairman: Dieter Schneider
- Manager: Reiner Maurer
- Stadium: Allianz Arena, Munich, Bavaria
- 2. Bundesliga: 6th
- DFB-Pokal: Round of 16
- Average home league attendance: 27,642
Home colours	Away colours	Third colours

The 2012–13 TSV 1860 Munich season was the 108th season in the club's football history. The club played in the 2. Bundesliga, the second tier of German football. It was the club's ninth consecutive season in the league, having played at this level since 2004–05, after being relegated from the Bundesliga in 2004.

The club also took part in the 2012–13 edition of the DFB-Pokal, reaching the round of 16.

== Review and events ==
It is the clubs ninth consecutive season in this league, having played at this level since 2004–05, after it was relegated from the Fußball-Bundesliga in 2004.

The club also takes part in the 2012–13 edition of the DFB-Pokal, the German Cup, where it reached the second round and will face fourth division side Berliner AK 07 next.

== Matches ==
=== Legend ===
Win Draw Loss Postponed

=== 2. Bundesliga ===
4 August 2012 1	1860 München	1–0	Jahn Regensburg	Munich
13:00	Wojtkowiak 8'	Report		Stadium: Allianz Arena; Attendance: 45.300; Referee: B. Dankert

13 August 2012 2	Dynamo Dresden	2–2	1860 München	Dresden
20:15	Poté 38'; Wojtkowiak 64' (o.g.)	Report	Lauth 18'; Bierofka 74'	Stadium: Glücksgas Stadium; Attendance: 9,772; Referee: Felix Zwayer

26 August 2012 3	1. FC Kaiserslautern	0–0	1860 München	Kaiserslautern
13:30		Report		Stadium: Fritz-Walter-Stadion; Attendance: 37.571; Referee: Markus Schmidt

31 August 2012 4	1860 München	3–0	MSV Duisburg	Munich
18:00	Lauth 2', 56'; Stoppelkamp 85'	Report		Stadium: Allianz Arena; Attendance: 22.600; Referee: Norbert Grudzinski

14 September 2012 5	VfL Bochum	0–0	1860 München	Bochum
18:00		Summary		Stadium: rewirpowerSTADION; Attendance: 13,098; Referee: Bastian Dankert

23 September 2012 6	1860 München	1–1	Eintracht Braunschweig	Munich
13:30	Aygün 59'	Summary	Kumbela 19'	Stadium: Allianz Arena; Attendance: 31,600; Referee: Tobias Christ

26 September 2012 7	Ingolstadt 04	0–2	1860 München	Ingolstadt
17:30		Summary	Stoppelkamp 32'; Guillermo Vallori 73'	Stadium: Audi Sportpark; Attendance: 14,319; Referee: Knut Kircher

29 September 2012 8	1860 München	4–0	SV Sandhausen	Munich
13:00	Halfar 10'; Stoppelkamp 20'; Bierofka 24'; Lauth 46'	Report		Stadium: Allianz Arena; Attendance: 19,100; Referee: Tobias Welz

5 October 2012 9	Hertha BSC	3–0	1860 München	Berlin
18:00	Lustenberger 75'; Ramos 55'; Ben-Hatira 57', 77'	Report		Stadium: Olympic Stadium; Attendance: 32,547; Referee: Markus Schmidt

22 October 2012 10	1860 München	1–1	Erzgebirge Aue	Munich
20:15	Vallori 66'	Report	Sylvestr 51'	Stadium: Allianz Arena; Attendance: 17,600; Referee: Tobias Stieler

26 October 2012 11	Energie Cottbus	1–0	1860 München	Cottbus
18:00	Banović 12'	Report		Stadium: Stadion der Freundschaft; Attendance: 8,820; Referee: Bastian Dankert

3 November 2012 12	1860 München	0–2	St. Pauli	Munich
13:00		Report	Boll 26'; Ginczek 53'	Stadium: Allianz Arena; Attendance: 31,500; Referee: Marco Fritz

11 November 2012 13	FSV Frankfurt	0–1	1860 München	Frankfurt
13:30		Report	Lauth 36'	Stadium: Frankfurter Volksbank Stadion; Attendance: 5,188; Referee: Markus Wingenbach

16 November 2012 14	1860 München	0–2	1. FC Köln	Munich
20:30		Report	McKenna 3'; Chihi 75'	Stadium: Allianz Arena; Attendance: 25,800; Referee: Markus Schmidt

24 November 2012 15	Union Berlin	2–2	1860 München	Berlin
13:00	Stuff 22'; Nemec 81'	Report	Lauth 53', 70'	Stadium: Stadion An der Alten Försterei; Attendance: 16,750; Referee: Florian Meyer

27 November 2012 16	1860 München	1–0	SC Paderborn 07	Munich
17:30	Lauth 38'	Report		Stadium: Allianz Arena; Attendance: 13.300; Referee: Dr. Robert Kampka

30 November 2012 17	VfR Aalen	1–1	1860 München	Aalen
18:00	Lechleiter 62'	Report	Wood 69'	Stadium: Scholz-Arena; Attendance: 9,342; Referee: Tobias Stieler

9 December 2012 18	Jahn Regensburg	1–1	1860 München	Regensburg
13:30	Hofmann 56' (pen.)	Report	Stoppelkamp 84'	Stadium: Jahnstadion; Attendance: 12,500; Referee: Bibiana Steinhaus

16 December 2012 19	1860 München	1–1	Dynamo Dresden	Munich
13:30	Vallori 81'	Report	Gueye 61'	Stadium: Allianz Arena; Attendance: 22,200; Referee: Christian Dingert

4 February 2013 20	1860 München	0–1	Kaiserslautern	Munich
20:30		Report	Riedel 87'	Stadium: Allianz Arena; Attendance: 19,100; Referee: Daniel Siebert

9 February 2013 21	MSV Duisburg	1–3	1860 München	Duisburg
13:00	Jovanović 9'	Report	Wood 15'; Bülow 45'; Stoppelkamp 81'	Stadium: Schauinsland-Reisen-Arena; Attendance: 11,027; Referee: Marcel Unger

15 February 2013 22	1860 München	0–1	VfL Bochum	Munich
18:00		Report	Scheidhauer 10'	Stadium: Allianz Arena; Attendance: 14,100; Referee: Markus Wingenbach

24 February 2013 23	Eintracht Braunschweig	1–2	1860 München	Braunschweig
13:30	Kumbela 56'	Report	Friend 77'; Lauth 85'	Stadium: Eintracht-Stadion; Attendance: 20,455; Referee: Thorsten Kinhöfer

3 March 2013 24	1860 München	1–1	FC Ingolstadt 04	Munich
13:30	Tomasov 27'	Report	Eigler 79'	Stadium: Allianz Arena; Attendance: 24,100; Referee: Christian Dietz

8 March 2013 25	SV Sandhausen	0–1	1860 München	Sandhausen
18:00		Report	Tomasov 54'	Stadium: Hardtwaldstadion; Attendance: 6,200; Referee: Florian Steuer

16 March 2013 26	1860 München	0–0	Hertha BSC	Munich
13:00		Report		Stadium: Allianz Arena; Attendance: 25,400; Referee: Bastian Dankert

28 March 2013 27	Erzgebirge Aue	0–1	1860 München	Aue
18:00		Report	Friend 14'	Stadium: Erzgebirgsstadion; Attendance: 9,300; Referee: Florian Meyer

7 April 2013 28	1860 München	1–1	Energie Cottbus	Munich
13:30	Halfar 50'	Report	Bittroff 70'	Stadium: Allianz Arena; Attendance: 18,200; Referee: Daniel Siebert

13 April 2013 29	FC St. Pauli	3–1	1860 München	Hamburg
13:00	Ginczek 34'; Bartels 70', 74'	Report	Friend 73'	Stadium: Millerntor-Stadion; Attendance: 28,892; Referee: Christian Fischer

20 April 2013 30	1860 München	1–2	FSV Frankfurt	Munich
13:00	Friend 70'	Report	Stark 20'; Görlitz 33'	Stadium: Allianz Arena; Attendance: 14,200; Referee: Thorsten Schriever

28 April 2013 31	1. FC Köln	1–1	1860 München	Cologne
13:30	Ujah 7'	Report	Halfar 78'	Stadium: RheinEnergieStadion; Attendance: 49,100; Referee: Marco Fritz

5 May 2013 32	1860 München	3–0	Union Berlin	Munich
13:30	Lauth 25', 63'; Stoppelkamp 45'	Report		Stadium: Allianz Arena; Attendance: 18,100; Referee: Markus Schmidt

12 May 2013 33	Paderborn 07	2–0	1860 München	Paderborn
13:30	Sağlık 4'; Kachunga 69'	Report		Stadium: Benteler-Arena; Attendance: 9,160; Referee: Norbert Grudzinski

19 May 2013 34	1860 München	3–0	VfR Aalen	Munich
13:30	Stahl 35'; Wood 59'; Lauth 75'	Report		Stadium: Allianz Arena; Attendance: 23,400; Referee: Christian Fischer

==== Table ====
===== League table =====
Pos	Team	Pld	W	D	L	GF	GA	GD	Pts
4	FSV Frankfurt	34	16	6	12	55	45	+10	54
5	1. FC Köln	34	14	12	8	43	33	+10	54
6	1860 Munich	34	12	13	9	39	31	+8	49
7	Union Berlin	34	13	10	11	50	49	+1	49
8	Energie Cottbus	34	12	12	10	41	36	+5	48

Source: kicker.de
Rules for classification: 1) points; 2) goal difference; 3) number of goals scored.

===== Results summary =====
Overall								Home						Away					
Pld	W	D	L	GF	GA	GD	Pts	W	D	L	GF	GA	GD	W	D	L	GF	GA	GD
26	9	11	6	28	22	+6	38	4	5	4	13	10	+3	5	6	2	15	12	+3

Last updated: 19 March 2013.
Source: kicker

=== DFB-Pokal ===
19 August 2012 1st Round	FC Hennef 05	0–6	1860 München	Bonn
14:30		Report (in German)	Vallori 31'; Lauth 33'; Tomasov (yellow card) 49'; Wojtkowiak (yellow card) 53'; Blanco 69'; Bülow 70'; Bierofka 72' (pen.); Stoppelkamp 90'	Stadium: Sportpark Nord; Attendance: 5,200; Referee: M. Kunzmann

18 August 2012 2nd Round	Berliner AK	0–3	1860 München	Berlin
19:00	Yigitoglu (yellow card) 49'; Altiparmak (yellow card) 83'	Report (in German)	Stoppelkamp 38', 62' (yellow card) 48'; Volz (yellow card) 38'; Blanco 89'	Stadium: Friedrich-Ludwig-Jahn-Sportpark; Attendance: 2,403; Referee: Bibiana Steinhaus (Hannover)

19 December 2012 Round of 16	VfL Bochum	3–0	1860 München	Bochum
19:00	Dedič 30'; Maltritz 75', 78'	Report		Stadium: rewirpowerSTADION; Attendance: 20,206; Referee: Tobias Welz

== Squad information ==
=== Squad and statistics ===
As of 14 March 2013

No.	Pos	Nat	Player	Total		2. Bundesliga		DFB-Pokal	
No.	Pos	Nat	Player	Apps	Goals	Apps	Goals	Apps	Goals
1	GK	(Hungary) HUN	Gábor Király	26	0	25	0	1	0
22	GK	(Germany) GER	Timo Ochs	2	0	0	0	2	0
30	GK	(Germany) GER	Vitus Eicher	0	0	0	0	0	0
2	DF	(Germany) GER	Moritz Volz	21	0	18	0	3	0
3	DF	(Poland) POL	Grzegorz Wojtkowiak	24	1	22	1	2	0
4	DF	(Germany) GER	Kai Bülow	25	2	22	1	3	1
5	DF	(Spain) ESP	Guillermo Vallori	22	3	22	3	0	0
13	DF	(Germany) GER	Necat Aygün	15	1	15	1	0	0
15	DF	(Germany) GER	Malik Fathi	6	0	6	0	0	0
26	DF	(Germany) GER	Christopher Schindler	18	0	15	0	3	0
27	DF	(Germany) GER	Arne Feick	7	0	6	0	1	0
36	DF	(Germany) GER	Phillipp Steinhart	0	0	0	0	0	0
6	MF	(Germany) GER	Dominik Stahl	20	0	18	0	2	0
7	MF	(Germany) GER	Daniel Bierofka	28	3	25	2	3	1
8	MF	(Romania) ROU	Maximilian Nicu	12	0	10	0	2	0
10	MF	(Germany) GER	Moritz Stoppelkamp	28	8	25	5	3	3
14	MF	(Croatia) CRO	Marin Tomasov	20	2	17	2	3	0
17	MF	(Germany) GER	Liridon Vocaj	0	0	0	0	0	0
19	MF	(Germany) GER	Sebastian Maier	9	0	9	0	0	0
20	MF	(Germany) GER	Stefan Wannenwetsch	5	0	4	0	1	0
21	MF	(Greece) GRE	Grigorios Makos	10	0	9	0	1	0
28	MF	(Germany) GER	Daniel Halfar	24	1	21	1	3	0
9	FW	(Canada) CAN	Rob Friend	5	1	5	1	0	0
11	FW	(Germany) GER	Benjamin Lauth	24	10	21	9	3	1
18	FW	(Argentina) ARG	Ismael Blanco	15	2	13	0	2	2
18	FW	(Norway) NOR	Ola Kamara	6	0	6	0	0	0
23	FW	(United States) USA	Bobby Wood	11	2	10	2	1	0
29	FW	(Germany) GER	Markus Ziereis	4	0	4	0	0	0
33	FW	(Germany) GER	Korbinian Vollmann	0	0	0	0	0	0
