= Daniel Bierofka =

German football player and coach

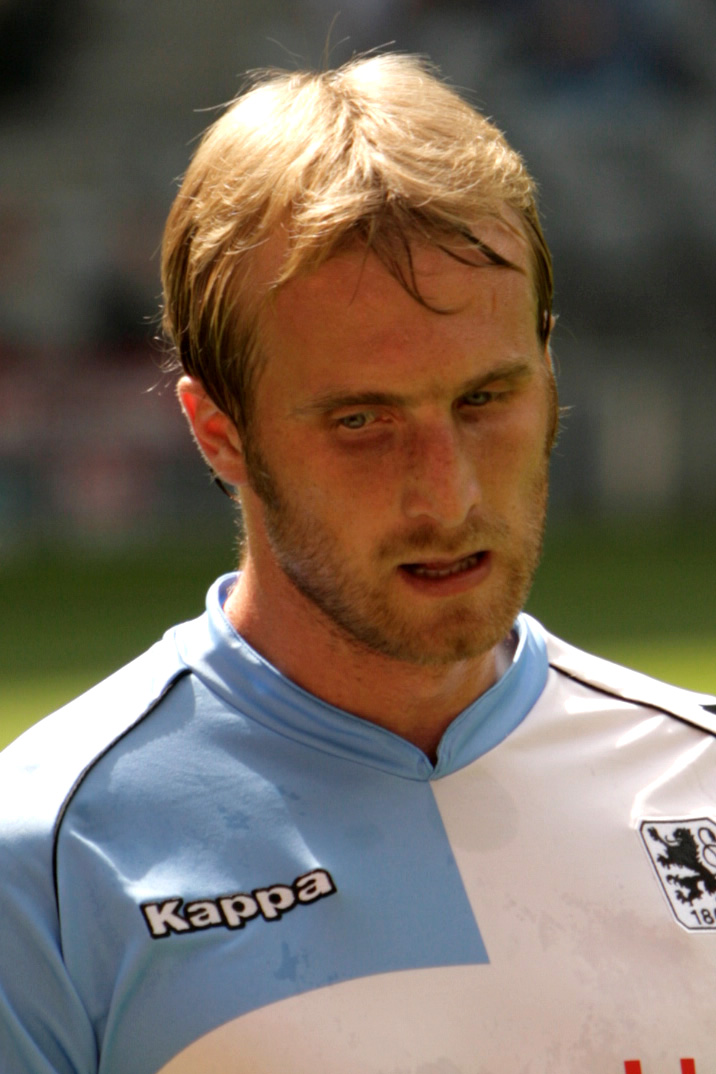
- Bierofka with 1860 Munich in 2007

Personal information
- Date of birth: 7 February 1979 (age 47)
- Place of birth: Munich, West Germany
- Height: 1.78 m (5 ft 10 in)
- Position: Left midfielder

Youth career
- 1985–1993: SpVgg Feldmoching
- 1993–1994: SpVgg Unterhaching
- 1994–1997: Bayern Munich

Senior career*
| Years | Team | Apps | (Gls) |
| 1997–2000 | Bayern Munich II | 47 | (2) |
| 2000–2002 | 1860 Munich | 55 | (7) |
| 2002–2005 | Bayer Leverkusen | 78 | (11) |
| 2005–2007 | VfB Stuttgart | 13 | (0) |
| 2005–2006 | VfB Stuttgart II | 6 | (0) |
| 2007–2014 | 1860 Munich | 138 | (20) |
| 2014–2015 | 1860 Munich II | 0 | (0) |
| Total | | 337 | (40) |

International career
| 1999–2001 | Germany U21 | 20 | (6) |
| 2002 | Germany | 3 | (1) |
| 2002–2004 | Germany Team 2006 | 5 | (0) |

Managerial career
- 2015–2016: 1860 Munich II
- 2016: 1860 Munich
- 2016: 1860 Munich II
- 2016: 1860 Munich
- 2016–2017: 1860 Munich II
- 2017–2019: 1860 Munich
- 2020–2021: FC Wacker Innsbruck
- 2022–: SpVgg Unterhaching (U17)
- * Club domestic league appearances and goals

Daniel Bierofka (German pronunciation: [ˈdaːni̯eːl ˈbiːʁɔfkaː, -ni̯ɛl -]; born 7 February 1979) is a German football coach and former player. A former midfielder, his playing career was plagued by injuries which limited his chances of playing more matches for the Germany national team and forced him to retire after the 2013–14 season.

== Club career ==
Bierofka came through the Bayern Munich youth system and made it to the reserve squad but never played for the senior team. He then transferred to city rival 1860 Munich where he played 55 games in two seasons. He then moved to Bayer Leverkusen for three years before going over to VfB Stuttgart. In the 2006–07 season, Bierofka won the Bundesliga title with VfB Stuttgart. In June 2007, he returned to 1860 Munich with the club committing to a deferred payment of €400,000. In the first three levels of German football, he scored more than 40 goals in almost 340 matches.

== International career ==
Bierofka played three internationals for Germany and scored one goal – on 18 May 2002 in the 6–2 win against Austria in a friendly match.

== Coaching career ==
=== 1860 Munich ===
After ending his club career at 1860 Munich II in May 2014, Bierofka became head coach of the U-16 squad of his former club. On 18 February 2015, he became the head coach of 1860 Munich II after Torsten Fröhling was appointed head coach of the first team. In his debut on 14 March 2015, 1860 Munich II and Schalding-Heining finished in a 0–0 draw. In a Bavarian derby on 21 March 2015, 1860 Munich II lost to 1. FC Nürnberg II 2–0. He finished with a record of four wins, three draws, and five losses.

Bierofka took on the first team on 19 April 2016. Under his coaching, 1860 Munich won its first three matches against Eintracht Braunschweig, St. Pauli and SC Paderborn and thereby avoided relegation from the 2. Bundesliga. As he did not held a coaching license for the 2. Bundesliga, he was only allowed to coach with a special permit for three matches. He won all three of his matches. After this permit expired, Bierofka took over the second team again and was replaced by interim coach Denis Bushuev for the last match of the season against FSV Frankfurt. He was again appointed as the interim head coach on 22 November 2016.

After the first team was relegated from the 2. Bundesliga and failed to obtain a licence for the 3. Liga, Bierofka was appointed head coach for the 2017–18 season. He resigned on 7 November 2019.

=== Wacker Innsbruck ===
In May 2020, Bierofka signed a contract to become head coach at Wacker Innsbruck from the 2020-21 season. His appointment ended on 7 October 2021.

== Personal life ==
Bierofka's father Willi is a former player and former head coach of 1860 Munich.

== Career statistics ==
=== Club ===
Appearances and goals by club, season and competition
| Club | Season | League | | | Cup | | Europe | | Other | | Total | |
| Club | Season | Division | Apps | Goals | Apps | Goals | Apps | Goals | Apps | Goals | Apps | Goals |
|---|---|---|---|---|---|---|---|---|---|---|---|---|
| Bayern Munich II | 1997–98 | Regionalliga Süd | 1 | 0 | — | | — | | — | | 1 | 0 |
| Bayern Munich II | 1998–99 | Regionalliga Süd | 19 | 1 | — | | — | | — | | 19 | 1 |
| Bayern Munich II | 1999–2000 | Regionalliga Süd | 27 | 1 | — | | — | | — | | 27 | 1 |
| Bayern Munich II | Total | | 47 | 2 | 0 | 0 | 0 | 0 | 0 | 0 | 47 | 2 |
| 1860 Munich | 2000–01 | Bundesliga | 28 | 3 | 3 | 0 | 5 | 0 | — | | 36 | 3 |
| 1860 Munich | 2001–02 | Bundesliga | 27 | 4 | 2 | 0 | — | | — | | 29 | 4 |
| 1860 Munich | Total | | 55 | 7 | 5 | 0 | 5 | 0 | 0 | 0 | 65 | 7 |
| Bayer Leverkusen | 2002–03 | Bundesliga | 30 | 7 | 5 | 2 | 5 | 0 | 2 | 0 | 42 | 9 |
| Bayer Leverkusen | 2003–04 | Bundesliga | 32 | 4 | 3 | 1 | — | | — | | 35 | 5 |
| Bayer Leverkusen | 2004–05 | Bundesliga | 16 | 1 | 0 | 0 | 4 | 0 | 1 | 0 | 21 | 1 |
| Bayer Leverkusen | Total | | 78 | 11 | 8 | 1 | 9 | 0 | 3 | 0 | 98 | 15 |
| VfB Stuttgart | 2005–06 | Bundesliga | 1 | 0 | 0 | 0 | — | | — | | 1 | 0 |
| VfB Stuttgart | 2006–07 | Bundesliga | 12 | 0 | 3 | 1 | — | | — | | 15 | 1 |
| VfB Stuttgart | Total | | 13 | 0 | 3 | 1 | 0 | 0 | 0 | 0 | 16 | 1 |
| VfB Stuttgart II | 2005–06 | Regionalliga Süd | 6 | 0 | — | | — | | — | | 6 | 0 |
| 1860 Munich | 2007–08 | 2. Bundesliga | 32 | 7 | 4 | 0 | — | | — | | 36 | 7 |
| 1860 Munich | 2008–09 | 2. Bundesliga | 11 | 4 | 3 | 1 | — | | — | | 14 | 5 |
| 1860 Munich | 2009–10 | 2. Bundesliga | 0 | 0 | 0 | 0 | — | | — | | 0 | 0 |
| 1860 Munich | 2010–11 | 2. Bundesliga | 25 | 0 | 2 | 0 | — | | — | | 27 | 0 |
| 1860 Munich | 2011–12 | 2. Bundesliga | 31 | 6 | 2 | 0 | — | | — | | 33 | 6 |
| 1860 Munich | 2012–13 | 2. Bundesliga | 30 | 2 | 3 | 1 | — | | — | | 33 | 3 |
| 1860 Munich | 2013–14 | 2. Bundesliga | 9 | 1 | 0 | 0 | — | | — | | 9 | 1 |
| 1860 Munich | Total | | 138 | 20 | 14 | 2 | 0 | 0 | 0 | 0 | 152 | 22 |
| 1860 Munich II | 2014–15 | Regionalliga Bayern | 0 | 0 | — | | — | | — | | 0 | 0 |
| Career total | | | 337 | 40 | 30 | 4 | 14 | 0 | 3 | 0 | 384 | 44 |

=== International goal ===
Score and result list Germany's goal tally first, score column indicates score after Bierofka goal.

International goal scored by Daniel Bierofka
| No. | Date | Venue | Opponent | Score | Result | Competition |
|---|---|---|---|---|---|---|
| 1 | 18 May 2002 | BayArena, Leverkusen | Austria | 6–2 | 6–2 | Friendly match |

=== Coaching record ===
As of 9 July 2017

| Team | From | To | Record | | | | | |
| Team | From | To | M | W | D | L | Win % | Ref. |
|---|---|---|---|---|---|---|---|---|
| 1860 Munich II | 18 February 2015 | 19 April 2016 | 41 | 13 | 15 | 13 | 31.71 | |
| 1860 Munich | 19 April 2016 | 9 May 2016 | 3 | 3 | 0 | 0 | 100.00 | |
| 1860 Munich II | 1 July 2016 | 22 November 2016 | 34 | 18 | 9 | 7 | 52.94 | |
| 1860 Munich | 22 November 2016 | 18 December 2016 | 3 | 1 | 0 | 2 | 33.33 | |
| 1860 Munich II | 18 December 2016 | 9 July 2017 | 13 | 8 | 3 | 2 | 61.54 | |
| 1860 Munich | 9 July 2017 | 7 November 2019 | 43 | 30 | 6 | 7 | 69.77 | |
| FC Wacker Innsbruck | 1 September 2020 | 7 October 2021 | 45 | 24 | 9 | 12 | 53.33 | |
| SpVgg Unterhaching (U17) | 1 July 2022 | | 0 | 0 | 0 | 0 | — | |
| Total | | | 165 | 87 | 39 | 39 | 52.73 | — |

== Honours ==
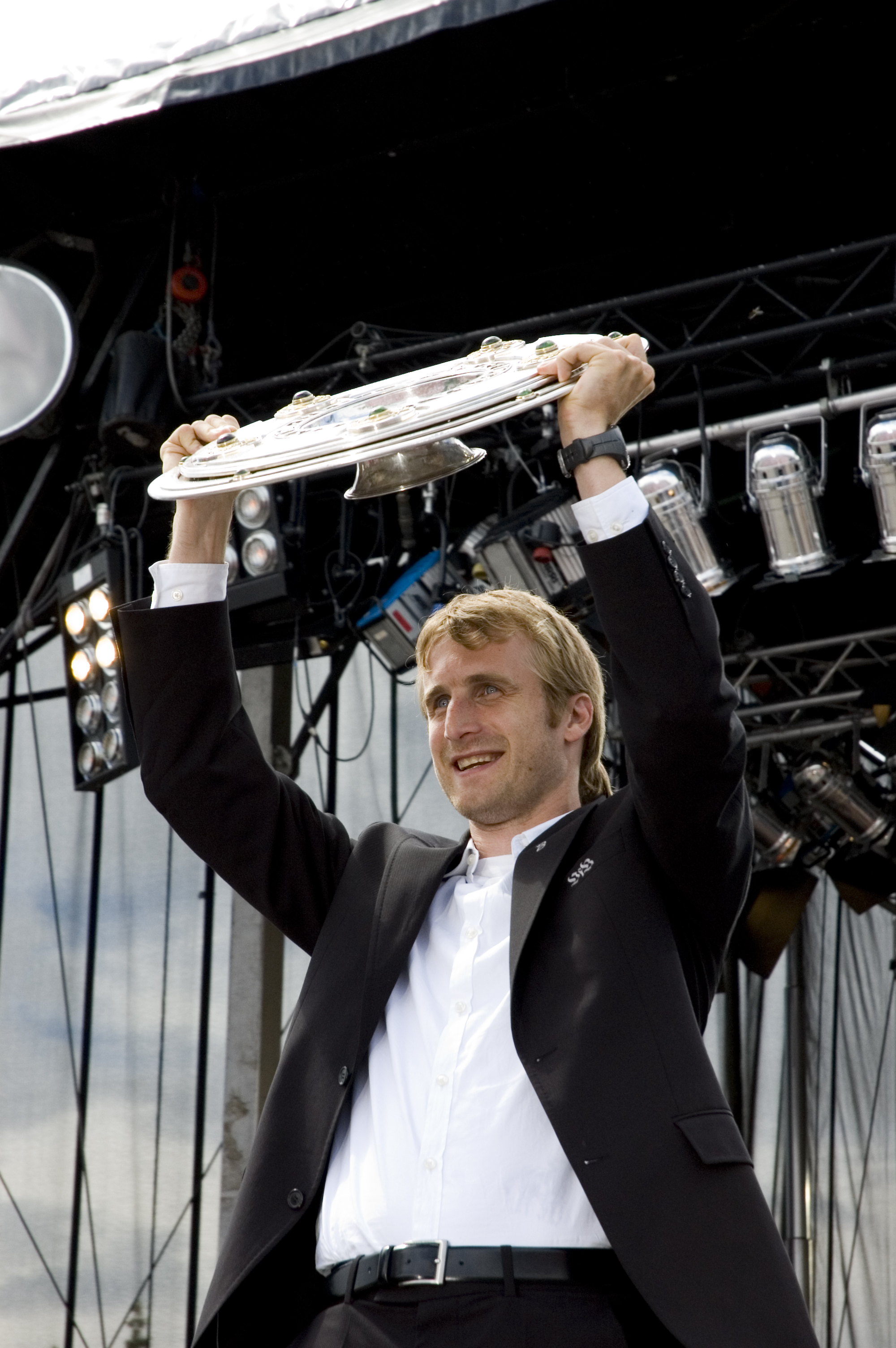
Bierofka celebrating the win of the 2007 Bundesliga with VfB Stuttgart

VfB Stuttgart

- Bundesliga: 2006–07
