= Daniel Halfar =

German former professional footballer (born 1988)

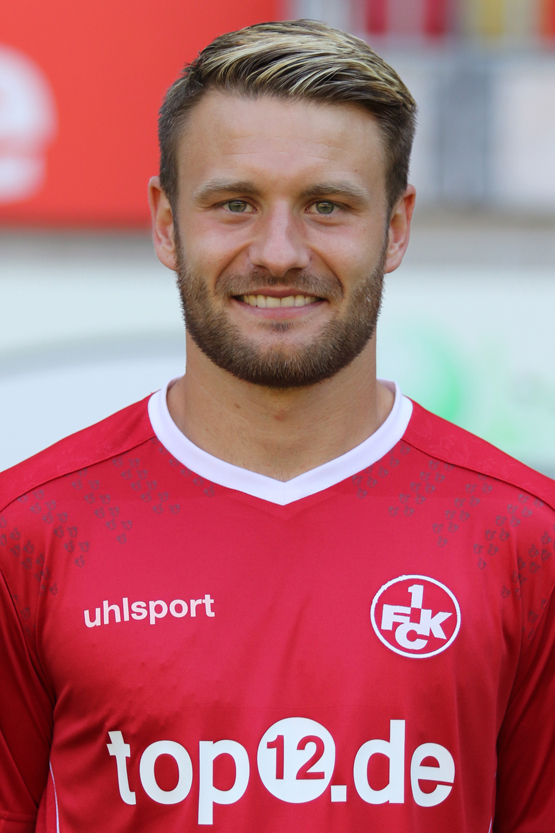
- Halfar in 2017.

Personal information
- Date of birth: 7 January 1988 (age 38)
- Place of birth: Mannheim, West Germany
- Height: 1.73 m (5 ft 8 in)
- Position: Midfielder

Youth career
- 1994–1998: MFC Phönix Mannheim 02
- 1998–2005: 1. FC Kaiserslautern

Senior career*
Years	Team	Apps	(Gls)
2005–2007	1. FC Kaiserslautern	29	(3)
2005–2007	1. FC Kaiserslautern II	12	(5)
2007–2010	Arminia Bielefeld	73	(1)
2007	Arminia Bielefeld II	5	(1)
2010–2013	1860 Munich	68	(8)
2013–2015	1. FC Köln	55	(3)
2015–2018	1. FC Kaiserslautern	65	(3)
Total		307	(24)

International career
2008–2009	Germany U21	3	(2)
- * Club domestic league appearances and goals

Daniel Halfar (born 7 January 1988) is a German former professional footballer who played as a midfielder.

== Career ==
Born in Mannheim, Halfar began his career at MFC Phönix Mannheim 02.

In 1997, he joined 1. FC Kaiserslautern. He made his debut on 11 December 2005 against Bayern Munich. Ten days later, with Halfar having made three substitute appearances in the Bundesliga, it was announced his first professional contract had been agreed, which would run from 1 January 2006 to 30 June 2010. He scored his first two goals in a match against MSV Duisburg on 4 February 2006. making him the youngest Kaiserslautern player to score (18 years, 28 days). Following his first season, Halfar was seen as a very big talent.

In August 2007 he moved to Arminia Bielefeld. He scored his first goal for his new club on 22 November 2008 against VfB Stuttgart. After three seasons with Arminia Bielefeld and scoring only one goal for the club, he was sold on a free transfer to 1860 Munich. In the summer of 2013 he transferred to 1. FC Köln, signing a three-year contract.

After having played for 1. FC Kaiserslautern between 2015 and 2018, Halfar retired from football in November 2018 due to a hip injury.

== International career ==
Halfar played for the Germany U21 national team.

== Career statistics ==
Appearances and goals by club, season and competition
Club	Season	League			Cup		Total	
Club	Season	Division	Apps	Goals	Apps	Goals	Apps	Goals
1. FC Kaiserslautern	2005–06	Bundesliga	18	3	1	0	19	3
1. FC Kaiserslautern	2006–07	2. Bundesliga	11	0	0	0	11	0
1. FC Kaiserslautern	Total		29	3	1	0	30	3
1. FC Kaiserslautern II	2005–06	Regionalliga Süd	7	5	—		7	5
1. FC Kaiserslautern II	2006–07	Regionalliga Süd	4	0	—		4	0
1. FC Kaiserslautern II	2007–08	Oberliga Südwest	1	0	—		1	0
1. FC Kaiserslautern II	Total		12	5	—		12	5
Arminia Bielefeld II	2007–08	Oberliga Westfalen	5	1	—		5	1
Arminia Bielefeld	2007–08	Bundesliga	16	0	1	0	17	0
Arminia Bielefeld	2008–09	Bundesliga	28	1	2	0	30	1
Arminia Bielefeld	2009–10	2. Bundesliga	29	0	2	1	31	1
Arminia Bielefeld	Total		73	1	5	1	78	2
1860 Munich	2010–11	2. Bundesliga	23	2	1	0	24	2
1860 Munich	2011–12	2. Bundesliga	18	3	1	0	19	3
1860 Munich	2012–13	2. Bundesliga	27	3	3	0	30	3
1860 Munich	Total		68	8	5	0	73	0
1. FC Köln	2013–14	2. Bundesliga	33	3	3	0	36	3
1. FC Köln	2014–15	Bundesliga	22	0	3	0	25	0
1. FC Köln	Total		55	3	6	0	61	3
1. FC Kaiserslautern	2015–16	2. Bundesliga	31	1	2	0	33	1
1. FC Kaiserslautern	2016–17	2. Bundesliga	25	1	1	0	26	1
1. FC Kaiserslautern	2017–18	2. Bundesliga	9	1	1	0	10	1
1. FC Kaiserslautern	Total		65	3	4	0	69	3
Career total			307	24	21	1	328	25
