= Maximilian Nicu =

German-Romanian footballer (born 1982)

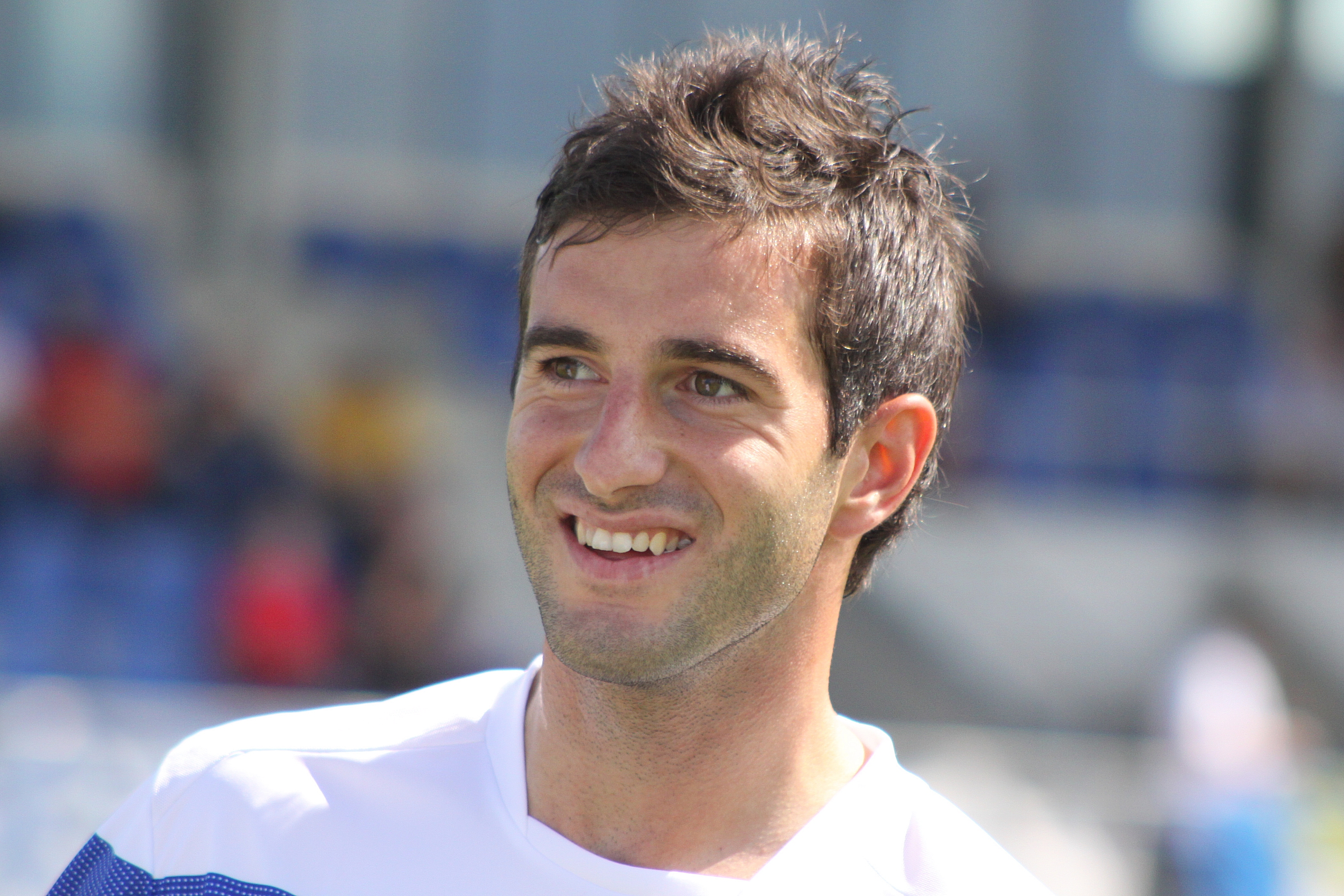
- Nicu with Hertha BSC in 2009

Personal information
- Full name: Maximilian Johannes Ştefan Nicu
- Date of birth: 25 November 1982 (age 43)
- Place of birth: Prien am Chiemsee, West Germany
- Height: 1.85 m (6 ft 1 in)
- Positions: Midfielder; centre-back

Youth career
- 1988–1994: TuS Prien
- 1994–1997: TSV 1860 Rosenheim
- 1997–2002: SpVgg Unterhaching

Senior career*
Years	Team	Apps	(Gls)
2002–2004	SpVgg Unterhaching	23	(2)
2004	Rot-Weiss Erfurt	13	(0)
2005–2006	Wehen Wiesbaden	48	(20)
2006–2007	Wacker Burghausen	31	(6)
2007–2008	Wehen Wiesbaden	32	(6)
2008–2010	Hertha BSC	43	(3)
2010–2011	SC Freiburg	27	(0)
2012–2013	1860 Munich	25	(0)
2014	Universitatea Cluj	8	(2)
2014–2015	Aris Limassol	7	(0)
2015	SV Elversberg	18	(1)
2015–2018	SpVgg Unterhaching	70	(7)
Total		345	(47)

International career
2009	Romania	3	(0)
- * Club domestic league appearances and goals

Maximilian Nicu (born 25 November 1982) is a former professional footballer who played as a midfielder or centre-back. He spent most of his career in Germany, apart from two short spells in Romania and Cyprus. Born in Germany, he played for the Romania national team internationally, making three appearances in 2009.

== Club career ==
=== Hertha BSC ===
Nicu made his first appearance with Hertha BSC on 31 July 2008 in the 2008–09 UEFA Cup first qualifying round second leg against FC Nistru Otaci. He made his Bundesliga debut on 17 August 2008 in Hertha's opening fixture against Eintracht Frankfurt. Nicu came on in the 71st minute as a substitute, replacing Patrick Ebert. After two seasons with Hertha, the club chose not to renew Nicu's contract following their relegation to the 2. Bundesliga.

=== SC Freiburg ===
On 1 July 2010, Nicu signed for SC Freiburg.

=== 1860 Munich ===
On 31 January 2012, Nicu signed for 2. Bundesliga side 1860 Munich.

=== Universitatea Cluj ===
On 14 January 2014 he signed a contract with Universitatea Cluj making it the first Romanian club in his career.

=== Aris Limassol ===
In July 2014, Nicu signed a one-year contract with Cypriot Second Division club Aris Limassol.

=== SV Elversberg ===
In January 2015, after a year abroad, he returned to his native Germany and signed for fourth tier Regionalliga Südwest side SV Elversberg until 2016.

=== SpVgg Unterhaching ===
In August 2015, Nicu joined SpVgg Unterhaching from Elversberg for a second stint at the club. In April 2018, Unterhaching announced Nicu would retire from professional football at the end of the 2017–18 season.

== International career ==
Nicu elected to play for the country of his parents, rather than his country of birth. In 2009, he requested a Romanian passport. Nicu was called up for matches against Serbia and Austria. At first it appeared he would not be able to play, since he had not received his Romanian citizenship yet, but on 17 March it was announced that Nicu had been granted citizenship and would be permitted to play.

On 20 March 2009, he pledged his vow to become a Romanian citizen. He made his debut for Romania on 1 April 2009 against Austria.

== Career statistics ==
=== Club ===
Appearances and goals by club, season and competition
Club	Season	League			National cup		Continental		Total	
Club	Season	Division	Apps	Goals	Apps	Goals	Apps	Goals	Apps	Goals
SpVgg Unterhaching	2002–03	Regionalliga Süd	23	2	3	0	—		26	2
SpVgg Unterhaching	2003–04	2. Bundesliga	0	0	0	0	—		0	0
SpVgg Unterhaching	Total		23	2	3	0	0	0	26	2
Rot-Weiß Erfurt	2003–04	Regionalliga Süd	13	0	—		—		13	0
SV Wehen Wiesbaden	2004–05	Regionalliga Süd	14	4	—		—		14	4
SV Wehen Wiesbaden	2005–06	Regionalliga Süd	34	16	—		—		34	16
SV Wehen Wiesbaden	Total		48	20	0	0	0	0	48	20
Wacker Burghausen	2006–07	2. Bundesliga	31	6	3	1	—		34	7
SV Wehen Wiesbaden	2007–08	2. Bundesliga	32	6	1	0	—		33	6
Hertha BSC	2008–09	Bundesliga	28	2	2	0	7 (Note: Appearances in the Europa League)	1	37	3
Hertha BSC	2009–10	Bundesliga	15	1	2	0	9	0	26	1
Hertha BSC	Total		43	3	4	0	16	1	63	4
SC Freiburg	2010–11	Bundesliga	23	0	1	0	—		24	0
SC Freiburg	2011–12	Bundesliga	4	0	1	0	—		5	0
SC Freiburg	Total		27	0	2	0	0	0	29	0
1860 Munich	2011–12	2. Bundesliga	15	0	0	0	—		15	0
1860 Munich	2012–13	2. Bundesliga	10	0	2	0	—		12	0
1860 Munich	Total		25	0	2	0	0	0	27	0
Universitatea Cluj	2013–14	Liga I	8	2	0	0	—		8	2
Aris Limassol	2014–15	Cypriot Second Division	7	0	0	0	—		7	0
SV Elversberg	2014–15	Regionalliga Südwest	14	1	—		—		14	1
SV Elversberg	2015–16	Regionalliga Südwest	4	0	1	0	—		5	0
SV Elversberg	Total		18	1	1	0	0	0	19	1
SpVgg Unterhaching	2015–16	Regionalliga Bayern	21	4	2	0	—		23	4
SpVgg Unterhaching	2016–17	Regionalliga Bayern	35	2	1	0	—		36	2
SpVgg Unterhaching	2017–18	3. Liga	14	1	0	0	—		7	0
SpVgg Unterhaching	Total		70	7	3	0	0	0	73	7
Career total			345	47	19	1	16	1	380	49

=== International ===
Appearances and goals by national team and year
National team	Year	Apps	Goals
Romania
Romania	2009	3	0
Total		3	0

== Honours ==
SpVgg Unterhaching

- Regionalliga Süd: 2002–03

Individual

- Regionalliga Süd top scorer: 2005–06 (16 goals)
