= Bobby Wood =

American soccer player

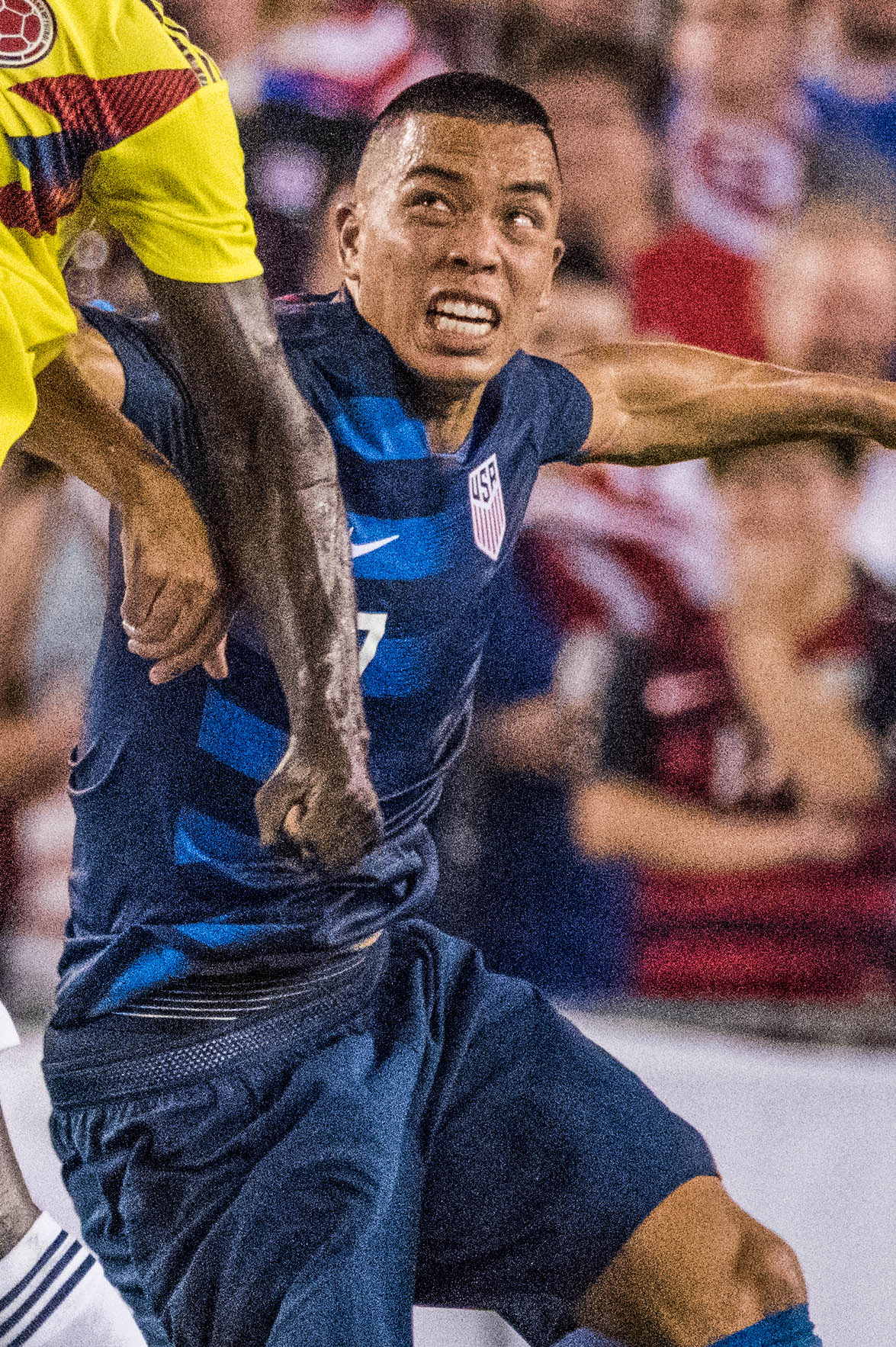
- Wood playing for the United States in 2018

Personal information
- Full name: Bobby Shou Wood
- Date of birth: November 15, 1992 (age 34)
- Place of birth: Honolulu, Hawaii, United States
- Height: 5 ft 11 in (1.80 m)
- Position: Striker

Youth career
- 1999–2005: Powder Edge SC
- 2005–2007: Irvine Strikers
- 2007–2010: 1860 Munich

Senior career*
Years	Team	Apps	(Gls)
2010–2013	1860 Munich II	46	(12)
2011–2015	1860 Munich	50	(3)
2015	→ Erzgebirge Aue (loan)	9	(3)
2015–2016	Union Berlin	31	(17)
2016–2021	Hamburger SV	74	(8)
2018–2019	→ Hannover 96 (loan)	20	(3)
2021–2022	Real Salt Lake	31	(5)
2021	→ Real Monarchs (loan)	1	(0)
2023–2024	New England Revolution	47	(11)

International career
2010–2011	United States U20	6	(4)
2011	United States U23	1	(0)
2013–2018	United States	45	(13)
Medal record
Men's soccer
Representing United States
CONCACAF Cup
Runner-up	2015 United States
- * Club domestic league appearances and goals as of October 19, 2024

Bobby Shou Wood (born November 15, 1992) is an American professional soccer player who plays as a striker.

== Youth and early career ==
Wood was born in Honolulu, Hawaii, to a mother with partial Japanese ancestry and a father with African-American ancestry. He began his youth career in 1999 with Powder Edge SC, based in Honolulu. He moved to California in 2005 to play with local club Irvine Strikers.

== Club career ==
At the age of 14, Wood relocated to Germany in July 2007 to join the academy of 1860 Munich.

=== 1860 Munich ===
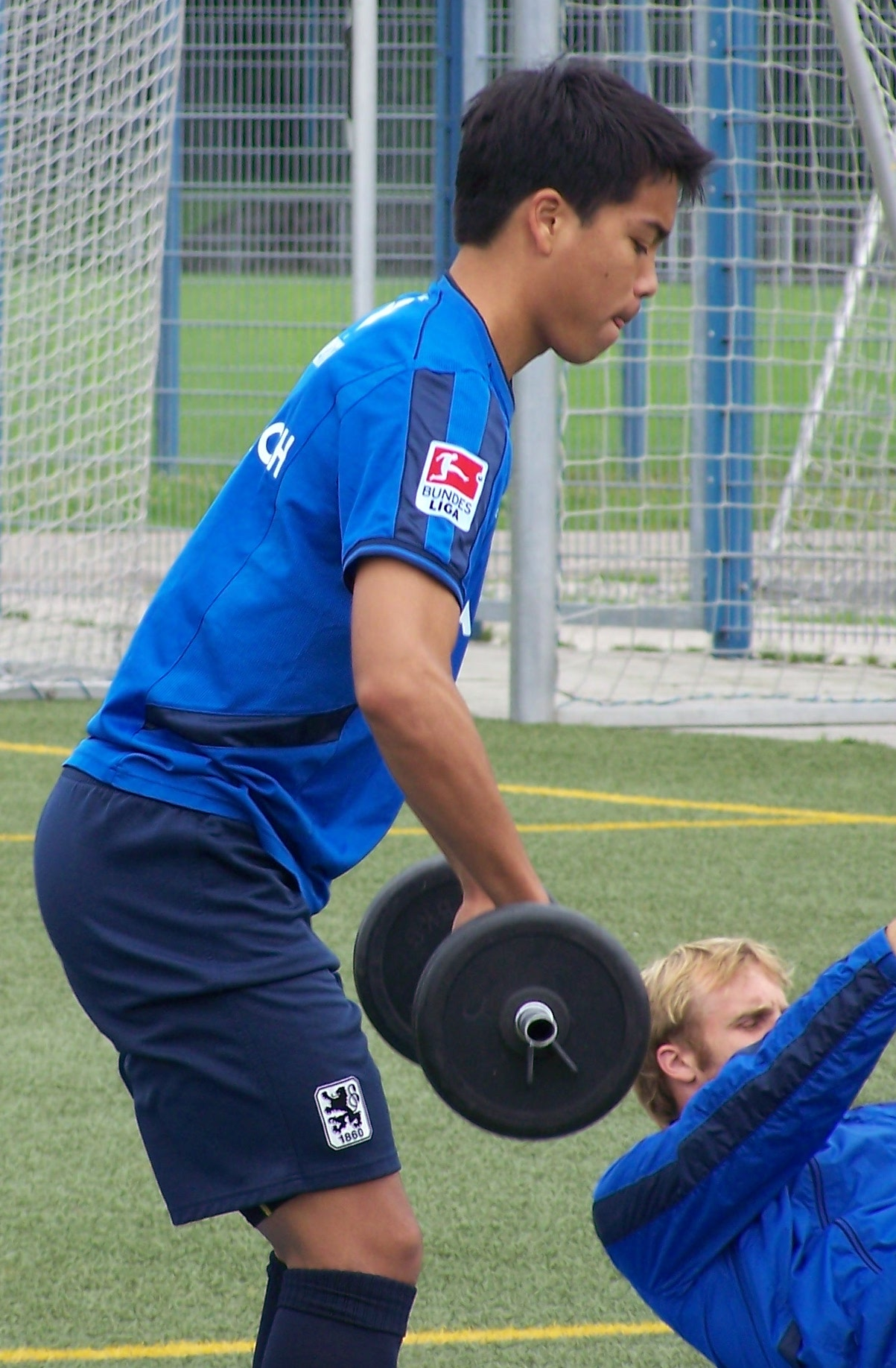
Wood training with 1860 Munich in 2011

On January 29, 2011, Wood made his professional debut, coming on in the 82nd minute as a substitute during a 2. Bundesliga match against MSV Duisburg.

Wood made his first career start for 1860 Munich in October 2011 against Hansa Rostock. On November 30, 2012, against VfR Aalen, Wood scored his first professional goal to secure a 1–1 draw for 1860 Munich.

In December 2012, Wood signed his first professional contract, extending his stay with 1860 Munich through the 2015–16 season.

==== Loan to Erzgebirge Aue ====
In February 2015, Wood joined fellow 2. Bundesliga side Erzgebirge Aue on loan for the rest of the 2014–15 season. For Aue, Wood made nine league appearances and scored three goals before seeing the club relegated to 3. Liga for the first time in six years.

=== Union Berlin ===
In July 2015, Wood signed a three-year contract with 2. Bundesliga side Union Berlin for an undisclosed fee. In his Union Berlin debut season, Wood broke the record for goals scored by an American in a single season in Germany's top two flights.

=== Hamburger SV ===
On May 15, 2016, Wood signed a four-year deal with Hamburger SV. On August 27, Wood made his Bundesliga debut with Hamburg against FC Ingolstadt. In the 1–1 draw, Wood scored the opening goal from the edge of the box, beating Ingolstadt defender Marvin Matip after receiving a long pass from goalkeeper René Adler. After his debut, manager Bruno Labbadia commented that Wood "has lots of pace and uses his body skillfully". His goal was later voted the Bundesliga's Goal of the Week. Wood scored the first goal on September 10 at Bayer Leverkusen after Bayer goalkeeper Bernd Leno came well off his line, but a late hat trick from Joel Pohjanpalo gave Bayer a 3–1 win.

Hamburg lost their next three league matches without scoring, and Labbadia was sacked on September 25. Wood made his first start under new manager Markus Gisdol on October 25 in their second round DFB-Pokal match against Hallescher FC, scoring twice in the 4–0 victory. Hamburg's league form did not improve, however, and five days later, in his first Bundesliga start under Gisdol, Wood was sent off at 1. FC Köln. After the match, Gisdol told reporters that Wood's red card, given when he elbowed Köln defender Dominique Heintz in the stomach, was "inexcusable", and Wood was handed a three-match ban by the DFB.

Hamburg won three of their remaining six matches of 2016, with Wood scoring in a 2–1 win against FC Schalke 04 on matchday 16, and finished the year 16th. They opened 2017 with two away defeats, 1–0 at VfL Wolfsburg and 3–1 at FC Ingolstadt, then won six of their next ten matches to climb to 13th; Wood scored in a 2–1 win against Borussia Mönchengladbach during that run. Three defeats and a draw in the next four matches left Hamburg 16th after matchday 32. On the penultimate matchday, they drew 1–1 away to Schalke through an injury-time goal from Pierre-Michel Lasogga, after Wood had missed a chance to equalize. A week later, Hamburg beat VfL Wolfsburg 2–1 on the last matchday to finish 14th and avoid the relegation play-off.

In the 2017–18 season, Hamburg lost 3–1 to third-tier VfL Osnabrück in the first round of the DFB-Pokal. They won their first two league matches, with Wood scoring in a 3–1 win away to 1. FC Köln, but won only two more in the first half of the season and were 17th at the winter break. Gisdol was sacked after a 2–0 home defeat to 1. FC Köln, and his successor, Bernd Hollerbach, after seven matches without a win. The club's new president, Bernd Hoffmann, dismissed CEO Heribert Bruchhagen and director of sport Jens Todt, and reserve-team head coach Christian Titz replaced Hollerbach. Hamburg won four of their last eight matches, with Wood scoring a penalty in a 3–1 win away to VfL Wolfsburg on matchday 32. Despite a 2–1 win against Borussia Mönchengladbach on the last matchday, in which Wood was sent off, Hamburg were relegated for the first time in their history, as VfL Wolfsburg beat 1. FC Köln.

==== Loan to Hannover 96 ====
On July 9, 2018, it was announced that Wood would be joining Hannover 96 on loan until the end of 2018–19 season with an option to buy.

=== Real Salt Lake ===
On April 2, 2021, Major League Soccer side Real Salt Lake announced the signing of Wood, effective July 1, on a contract running through the 2023 season. On April 13, Hamburger SV announced that Wood's contract was terminated prematurely, allowing him to join Real Salt Lake immediately and in time for the season start. Following the 2022 season, his contract option was declined by Salt Lake.

==== Loan to Real Monarchs ====
On October 7, 2021, Wood was sent on loan to Real Salt Lake's reserve side, Real Monarchs, for the remainder of the 2021 USL Championship season.

=== New England Revolution ===
Wood was selected by the New England Revolution in the 2022 MLS Re-Entry Draft on November 22, 2022. He was officially signed by New England on December 5, on a one-year deal for the upcoming 2023 season. The deal additionally contained a club option for the 2024 season.

Wood made his debut for his new club in the opening match of the 2023 season, on February 25, 2023, entering the match as a 64th-minute substitute for Giacomo Vrioni in the Revolution's 1–0 victory over Charlotte FC. In the Revolution's home opener on March 4, Wood scored his first goal for the Revolution and added an assist in the Revolution's 3–0 victory over Houston Dynamo FC. On April 9, Wood scored the Revolution's third goal in their 4–0 victory over CF Montréal. On May 6, Wood scored the game-winner in the Revolution's 2–0 victory over Toronto FC. On May 27, Wood scored New England's second goal of the game in a 3–3 home draw against Chicago Fire. Four days later he scored again in the Revolution's 3–3 draw against Atlanta United. Wood scored his sixth goal of the season on June 10, in the Revolution's 3–1 victory over Inter Miami. On June 24, Wood scored the Revolution's first goal in their 2–1 victory over Toronto FC. Wood finished the 2023 campaign with seven goals and five assists, second in scoring for the Revolution.

During the 2024 season, Wood made 18 appearances, of which six were starts, for the Revolution and scored three goals in regular season play. He suffered a knee injury early in the season, making his regular season debut on April 6, 2024. On August 9, Wood scored an equalizing goal against New York City FC in the 2024 Leagues Cup knockout stage. On August 24, Wood scored his first MLS career brace, helping the Revolution defeat CF Montréal 5–0.

== International career ==
In May 2013, Wood was named to the preliminary United States 35-man roster for the 2013 Gold Cup. He later made his senior international debut for the United States in a friendly match against Bosnia and Herzegovina in August 2013.

Wood scored his first senior international goal on June 5, 2015, a game-winning goal in a 4–3 victory against the Netherlands. Five days later, Wood scored the game-winning goal in a 2–1 friendly victory against top-ranked Germany in Cologne. In the 2015 CONCACAF Cup against Mexico to decide which team would qualify for the 2017 Confederations Cup, coach Jürgen Klinsmann substituted Wood on in the 98th minute, after Mexico scored the go-ahead goal in extra time. Wood scored the tying goal in the 108th minute on a through ball from DeAndre Yedlin, but the United States ended up losing the match on an additional extra time goal from Mexico. On September 5, 2017, Wood scored the tying goal in the 85th minute against Honduras to keep the US hopes alive in the CONCACAF qualifications for the 2018 FIFA World Cup in Russia, securing a 1–1 draw. On October 6, he scored a goal to give a 4–0 lead for United States against Panama with one more match in the group to spare.

== Career statistics ==
=== Club ===
As of match played October 19, 2024

Appearances and goals by club, season and competition
Club	Season	League			National cup (Note: Includes DFB-Pokal, U.S. Open Cup and MLS Cup playoffs.)		Other (Note: Includes Leagues Cup and CONCACAF Champions League/Cup)		Total		Ref.
Club	Season	Division	Apps	Goals	Apps	Goals	Apps	Goals	Apps	Goals	Ref.
1860 Munich II	2009–10	Regionalliga Süd	1	0	–		–		1	0	
1860 Munich II	2010–11	Regionalliga Süd	8	2	–		–		8	2	
1860 Munich II	2011–12	Regionalliga Süd	10	2	–		–		10	2	
1860 Munich II	2012–13	Regionalliga Bayern	26	8	–		–		26	8	
1860 Munich II	2013–14	Regionalliga Bayern	1	0	–		–		1	0	
1860 Munich II	Total		46	12	0	0	0	0	46	12	—
1860 Munich	2010–11	2. Bundesliga	5	0	0	0	—		5	0	
1860 Munich	2011–12	2. Bundesliga	3	0	1	0	–		4	0	
1860 Munich	2012–13	2. Bundesliga	15	3	1	0	–		16	3	
1860 Munich	2013–14	2. Bundesliga	21	0	1	0	–		22	0	
1860 Munich	2014–15	2. Bundesliga	6	0	1	0	–		7	0	
1860 Munich	Total		50	3	4	0	0	0	54	3	—
Erzgebirge Aue (loan)	2014–15	2. Bundesliga	9	3	0	0	—		9	3	
Union Berlin	2015–16	2. Bundesliga	31	17	1	0	—		32	17	
Hamburger SV	2016–17	Bundesliga	28	5	4	4	—		32	9	
Hamburger SV	2017–18	Bundesliga	24	2	1	1	–		25	3	
Hamburger SV	2019–20	2. Bundesliga	6	0	0	0	–		6	0	
Hamburger SV	2020–21	2. Bundesliga	16	1	1	0	–		17	1	
Hamburger SV	Total		74	8	6	5	—		80	13	—
Hannover 96 (loan)	2018–19	Bundesliga	20	3	2	0	—		22	3	
Real Salt Lake	2021	MLS	17	2	3	1	—		20	3	
Real Salt Lake	2022	MLS	14	3	0	0	–		14	3	
Real Salt Lake	Total		31	5	0	0	0	0	34	6	—
New England Revolution	2023	MLS	29	7	2	0	2	0	33	7	
New England Revolution	2024	MLS	18	4	—		7	2	25	6	
New England Revolution	Total		47	11	2	0	9	2	58	13	—
Career total			308	62	18	7	9	2	335	70	—

=== International ===
Appearances and goals by national team and year
National team	Year	Apps	Goals
United States	2013	1	0
United States	2014	4	0
United States	2015	9	4
United States	2016	15	4
United States	2017	7	2
United States	2018	8	3
Total		44	13

Scores and results list United States' goal tally first, score column indicates score after each Wood goal.

List of international goals scored by Bobby Wood
No.	Date	Venue	Opponent	Score	Result	Competition
1	June 5, 2015	Amsterdam Arena, Amsterdam, Netherlands	Netherlands	4–3	4–3	Friendly
2	June 10, 2015	RheinEnergieStadion, Cologne, Germany	Germany	2–1	2–1	Friendly
3	October 10, 2015	Rose Bowl, Pasadena, United States	Mexico	2–2	2–3	CONCACAF Cup
4	November 13, 2015	Busch Stadium, St. Louis, United States	Saint Vincent and the Grenadines	1–1	6–1	2018 FIFA World Cup qualification
5	May 22, 2016	Juan Ramón Loubriel Stadium, Bayamón, Puerto Rico	Puerto Rico	2–0	3–1	Friendly
6	June 7, 2016	Soldier Field, Chicago, United States	Costa Rica	3–0	4–0	Copa América Centenario
7	September 2, 2016	Arnos Vale Stadium, Kingstown, Saint Vincent and the Grenadines	Saint Vincent and the Grenadines	1–0	6–0	2018 FIFA World Cup qualification
8	November 11, 2016	MAPFRE Stadium, Columbus, United States	Mexico	1–1	1–2	2018 FIFA World Cup qualification
9	September 5, 2017	Estadio Olímpico Metropolitano, San Pedro Sula, Honduras	Honduras	1–1	1–1	2018 FIFA World Cup qualification
10	October 6, 2017	Orlando City Stadium, Orlando, United States	Panama	4–0	4–0	2018 FIFA World Cup qualification
11	March 27, 2018	WakeMed Soccer Park, Cary, United States	Paraguay	1–0	1–0	Friendly
12	June 2, 2018	Aviva Stadium, Dublin, Republic of Ireland	Republic of Ireland	1–0	1–2	Friendly
13	October 11, 2018	Raymond James Stadium, Tampa, United States	Colombia	2–1	2–4	Friendly

== Honors ==
United States

- CONCACAF Cup runner-up: 2015
