= Sebastian Maier =

German footballer (born 1993)

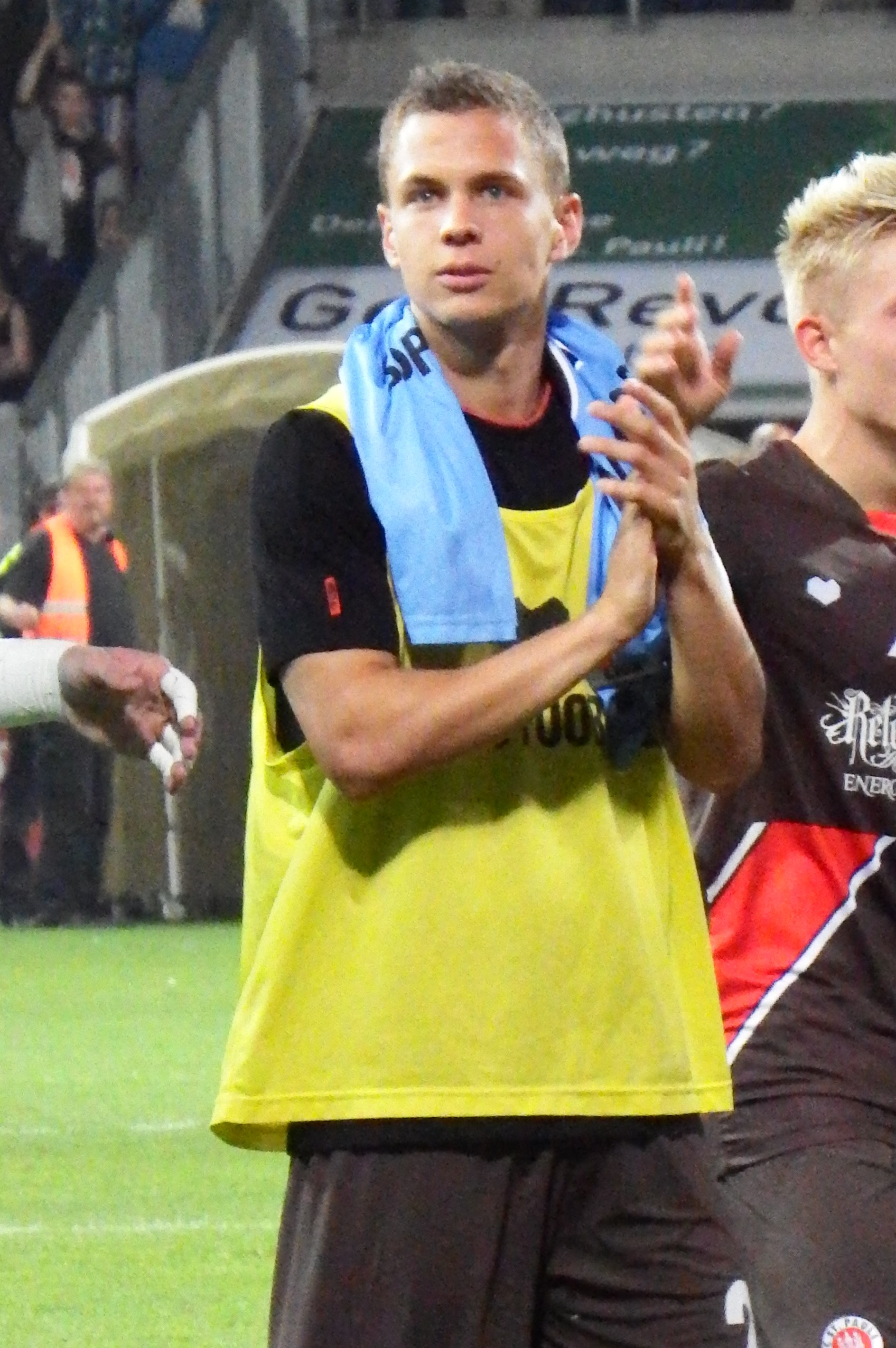
- Maier with FC St. Pauli in 2013

Personal information
- Date of birth: 18 September 1993 (age 33)
- Place of birth: Landshut, Germany
- Height: 1.79 m (5 ft 10 in)
- Position: Attacking midfielder

Team information
- Current team: SpVgg Unterhaching
- Number: 10

Youth career
- 2000–2004: SC Weihmichl
- 2004–2011: 1860 Munich

Senior career*
Years	Team	Apps	(Gls)
2011–2013	1860 Munich II	23	(7)
2011–2013	1860 Munich	24	(0)
2013–2016	FC St. Pauli	70	(9)
2013–2014	→ FC St. Pauli II	2	(0)
2016–2018	Hannover 96	27	(2)
2018–2021	VfL Bochum	25	(0)
2021–2022	Türkgücü München	21	(0)
2022–	SpVgg Unterhaching	84	(6)

International career^{‡}
2011	Germany U19	3	(0)
- * Club domestic league appearances and goals as of 25 May 2025 ‡ National team caps and goals as of 10 August 2014

Sebastian Maier (born 18 September 1993) is a German professional footballer who plays as an attacking midfielder for club SpVgg Unterhaching.

== Career ==
Maier started his career with 1860 Munich, where he played during the 2011–12 and 2012–13 seasons.

In early 2013, Maier decided not to extend his contract with 1860 Munich. Thus he was able to join 2. Bundesliga rivals FC St. Pauli on a free transfer for the 2013–14 season. He signed for St. Pauli on a three-year deal until 2016. He finished the 2013–14 season with four goals in 25 appearances for the first team and a goal i ntwo appearances for the reserve team. He finished the 2014–15 season with two goals in 21 appearances. He finished the 2015–16 season with three goals in 28 appearances.

Maier signed for Hannover 96 for the 2016–17 season, again remaining in the 2. Bundesliga. He finished the 2016–17 season with three goals in 20 appearances. He finished the 2017–18 season with a goal in 12 appearances.

Maier moved to 3. Liga club Türkgücü München in January 2021, having agreed a contract until 2022.

On 12 June 2022, Maier joined Regionalliga Bayern club SpVgg Unterhaching on a one-year deal.

In early May 2024 he announced he will retire at the end of the 2024–25 season.

== Career statistics ==
As of match played 24 September 2022

Appearances and goals by club, season and competition
Club	Season	League			Cup		Other		Total	
Club	Season	Division	Apps	Goals	Apps	Goals	Apps	Goals	Apps	Goals
1860 Munich	2011–12	2. Bundesliga	15	0	0	0	—		15	0
1860 Munich	2012–13	2. Bundesliga	9	0	0	0	—		9	0
1860 Munich	Total		24	0	0	0	—		24	0
1860 Munich II	2011–12	Regionalliga Süd	4	1	—		—		4	1
1860 Munich II	2012–13	Regionalliga Bayern	19	6	—		2 (Note: Appearances in the Regionalliga playoff)	1	21	7
1860 Munich II	Total		23	7	—		2	1	25	8
FC St. Pauli II	2013–14	Regionalliga Nord	2	1	—		—		2	1
FC St. Pauli	2013–14	2. Bundesliga	24	4	1	0	—		25	4
FC St. Pauli	2014–15	2. Bundesliga	19	2	2	0	—		21	2
FC St. Pauli	2015–16	2. Bundesliga	27	3	1	0	—		28	3
FC St. Pauli	Total		70	9	4	0	—		74	9
Hannover 96	2016–17	2. Bundesliga	17	2	3	1	—		20	3
Hannover 96	2017–18	Bundesliga	10	0	2	1	—		12	1
Hannover 96	Total		27	2	5	2	—		32	4
VfL Bochum	2018–19	2. Bundesliga	10	0	0	0	—		10	0
VfL Bochum	2019–20	2. Bundesliga	15	0	1	0	—		16	0
VfL Bochum	2020–21	2. Bundesliga	0	0	0	0	—		0	0
VfL Bochum	Total		25	0	1	0	—		26	0
Türkgücü München	2020–21	3. Liga	15	0	0	0	2 (Note: Appearances in Bavarian Cup)	0	17	0
Türkgücü München	2021–22	3. Liga	6	0	0	0	2	0	8	0
Türkgücü München	Total		21	0	0	0	4	0	25	0
SpVgg Unterhaching	2022–23	Regionalliga Bayern	12	2	0	0	0	0	12	2
Career total			204	21	10	2	6	1	220	24

== Honours ==
SpVgg Unterhaching

- Regionalliga Bayern: 2022–23
