= Sandro Kaiser =

German footballer

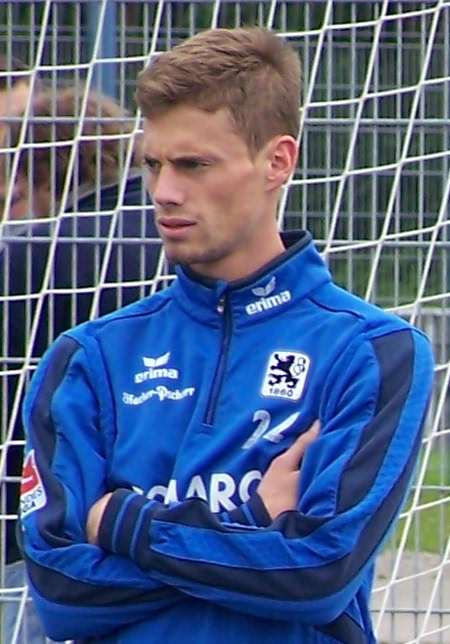
- Sandro Kaiser in 2011

Personal information
- Date of birth: 21 September 1989 (age 37)
- Place of birth: Fürstenfeldbruck, West Germany
- Height: 1.77 m (5 ft 9 1/2 in)
- Position: Midfielder

Youth career
- –2001: MTV Diessen
- 2001–2008: TSV 1860 München

Senior career*
| Years | Team | Apps | (Gls) |
| 2008–2009 | TSV 1860 München II | 34 | (5) |
| 2009–2012 | TSV 1860 München | 30 | (1) |
| 2011 | → Arminia Bielefeld (loan) | 15 | (0) |
| 2012 | 1. FC Heidenheim | 0 | (0) |
| 2013 | FSV Frankfurt II | 0 | (0) |
| 2014 | SpVgg Unterhaching | 0 | (0) |
| 2014 | → SpVgg Unterhaching II | 5 | (2) |
| 2014–2015 | FC Eintracht Bamberg | 9 | (1) |
| Total | | 93 | (9) |
- * Club domestic league appearances and goals

Sandro Kaiser is a German retired footballer.
