= Julian Ratei =

German footballer

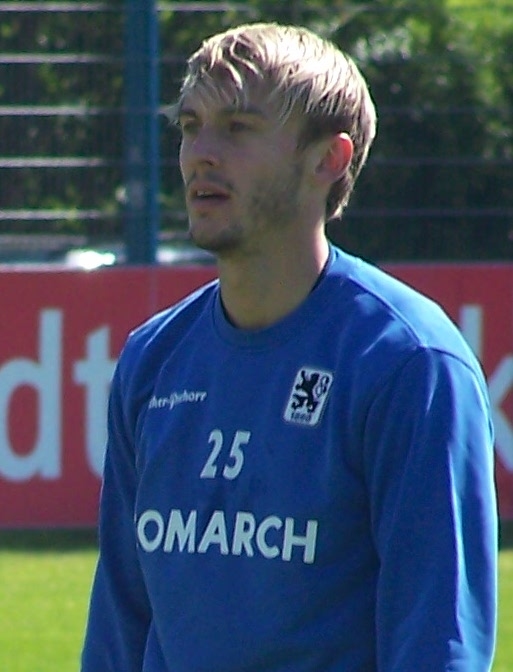
- Ratei in 2010.

Personal information
- Date of birth: July 12, 1988 (age 38)
- Place of birth: Bayreuth, West Germany
- Position: Right-back

Youth career
- Sportring Bayreuth
- –2003: SpVgg Bayreuth
- 2003–2006: 1860 Munich

Senior career*
| Years | Team | Apps | (Gls) |
| 2006–2011 | 1860 Munich II | 59 | (0) |
| 2011–2014 | SV Darmstadt 98 | 28 | (1) |

International career
| 2006 | Germany U-19 | 2 | (0) |
- * Club domestic league appearances and goals as of 10 August 2013

Julian Ratei (born July 12, 1988) is a German footballer who played in the 3. Liga for SV Darmstadt 98. He plays as a defender.
