= Stefan Buck =

German footballer (born 1980)

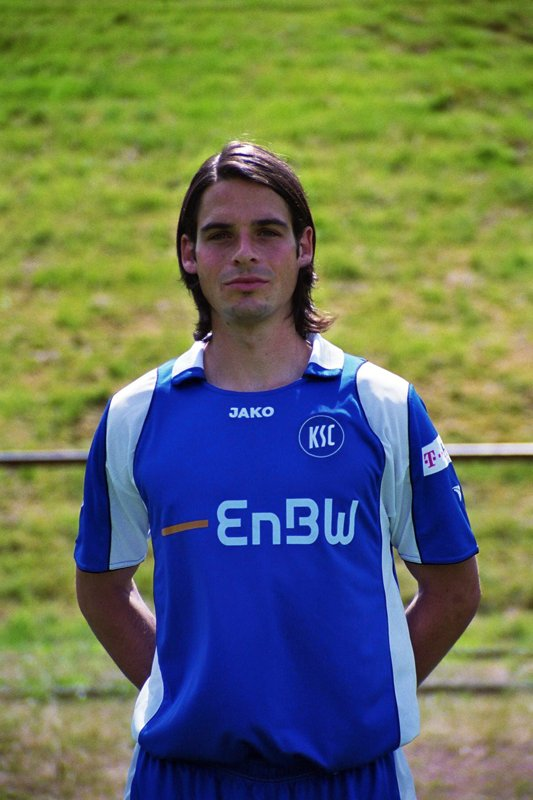
- Buck while with Karlsruher SC in 2007

Personal information
- Date of birth: 3 September 1980 (age 46)
- Place of birth: Bad Saulgau, West Germany
- Height: 1.89 m (6 ft 2 in)
- Position: Defender

Team information
- Current team: RB Leipzig (assistant coach)

Youth career
- FV Altshausen
- FV Biberach
- –1999: FV Ravensburg
- 1999–2000: FV Bad Saulgau

Senior career*
| Years | Team | Apps | (Gls) |
| 2000–2004 | SC Pfullendorf | 93 | (5) |
| 2004–2005 | Bayern Munich II | 32 | (3) |
| 2005–2007 | SpVgg Unterhaching | 54 | (11) |
| 2007–2009 | Karlsruher SC II | 4 | (0) |
| 2007–2009 | Karlsruher SC | 20 | (2) |
| 2009–2010 | FC Augsburg | 24 | (1) |
| 2010–2012 | 1860 Munich | 53 | (3) |
| 2012–2015 | Bayern Munich II | 79 | (2) |
| Total | | 359 | (27) |

Managerial career
- 2017: Bayern Munich U16 (caretaker)
- * Club domestic league appearances and goals

Stefan Buck (born 3 September 1980) is a German former professional footballer who played as a defender. He currently works as an assistant coach for Bundesliga club RB Leipzig.

== Career ==
Buck played for a number of clubs in Baden-Württemberg before joining Oberliga side SC Pfullendorf in 2000. The club won the Oberliga Baden-Württemberg in 2002, and Buck spent the next two years playing for them in the Regionalliga Süd, before joining FC Bayern Munich II in 2004.

Buck stayed in Munich, joining 2. Bundesliga side SpVgg Unterhaching in 2005. He spent two years with the club but the 2006–07 season ended in relegation, and Buck left the club, joining Karlsruher SC, Buck's debut for Karlsruhe was a goalscoring one; he scored in the last minute of extra time to secure a 2–0 win over TSG Neustrelitz in the first round of the DFB Pokal, having come on as a sub for Tamás Hajnal. His Bundesliga debut came three months later, as a replacement for Bradley Carnell in the last minute of a match with MSV Duisburg, and he ended the season with thirteen league appearances.

Buck only made six league appearances the following season. Shortly after the beginning of the 2009–10 season, he signed for FC Augsburg, for whom he made 24 appearances. In July 2010, Buck signed for another Bavarian 2. Bundesliga club, TSV 1860 Munich, where he would spend the next two seasons, making over 50 appearances.

In 2012, Buck returned to FC Bayern Munich II, then in the fourth tier Regionalliga Bayern. He was named as team captain. After three years with the club, he retired from professional football in 2015.
