= Jonatan Kotzke =

German footballer

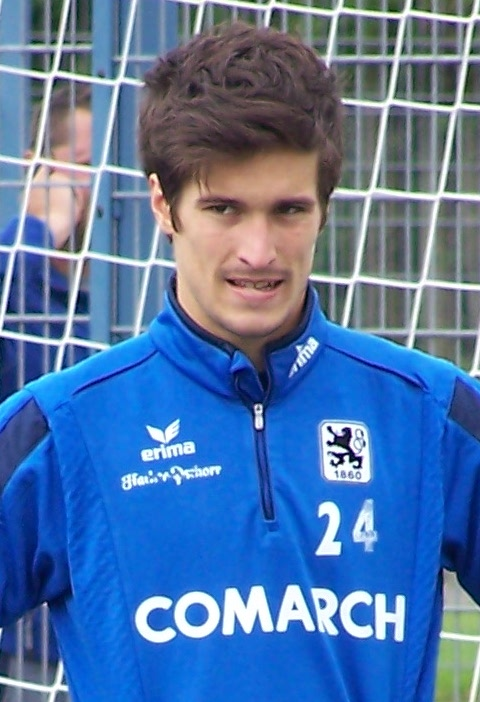
- Kotzke at practice with 1860 Munich in 2011

Personal information
- Date of birth: 18 May 1990 (age 36)
- Place of birth: Pinneberg, West Germany
- Height: 1.84 m (6 ft 0 in)
- Positions: Centre-back; defensive midfielder

Senior career*
Years	Team	Apps	(Gls)
2008–2011	1. FC Nürnberg II	59	(1)
2011–2012	1860 Munich II	25	(2)
2011–2012	1860 Munich	1	(0)
2012–2014	Jahn Regensburg	44	(2)
2014–2016	SV Wehen Wiesbaden	3	(0)
2015–2016	SV Wehen Wiesbaden II	2	(2)
2016	VfR Aalen	15	(1)
2016–2017	Teutonia Watzenborn-Steinberg	28	(2)
2017–2021	FC Ingolstadt 04 II	54	(9)
2018–2022	FC Ingolstadt 04	55	(1)
2022–2023	Górnik Zabrze	16	(0)
- * Club domestic league appearances and goals as of 10 May 2023

Jonatan Kotzke (born 18 May 1990) is a German professional footballer who plays as either a centre-back or a defensive midfielder. He previously played for 1860 Munich, Jahn Regensburg, SV Wehen Wiesbaden, VfR Aalen, FC Ingolstadt 04 and Górnik Zabrze.
