= Necat Aygün =

German footballer (born 1980)

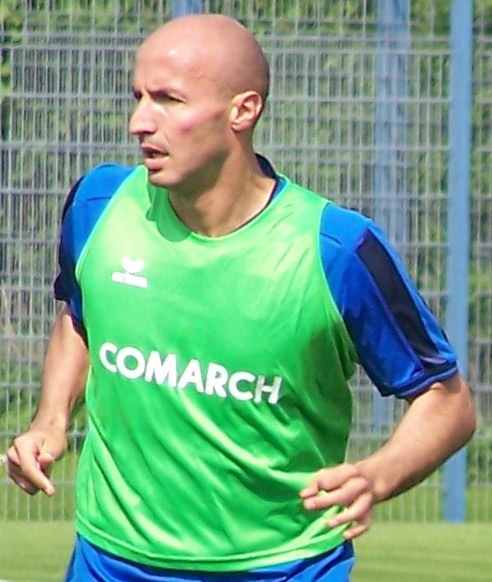
- Aygün training with 1860 Munich

Personal information
- Date of birth: 26 February 1980 (age 46)
- Place of birth: Munich, West Germany
- Height: 1.92 m (6 ft 4 in)
- Position: Defender

Youth career
- –1992: Wacker München
- 1992–2000: 1860 Munich

Senior career*
Years	Team	Apps	(Gls)
2000–2001	1860 Munich II	30	(5)
2001–2002	Beşiktaş	8	(0)
2002	1860 Munich	10	(0)
2003–2005	SpVgg Unterhaching	46	(7)
2006–2009	MSV Duisburg	8	(0)
2008–2009	→ FC Ingolstadt (loan)	25	(1)
2010	SV Sandhausen	11	(1)
2010–2013	1860 Munich	45	(4)
2010–2014	1860 Munich II	34	(4)
Total		217	(21)
- * Club domestic league appearances and goals

Necat Aygün (born 26 February 1980) is a German former professional footballer who played as a defender.

== Career ==
Aygün was born in Munich.

After retiring in summer 2014, Aygün was hired as a scout for TSV 1860 Munich. In summer 2015, he was promoted to sporting director of the first team. He was replaced by Oliver Kreuzer on 4 November 2015.

After that, Aygün did not work for a professional club before he took up a position as technical director for sports at the second division club Karlsruher SC on 1 February 2020.
