= Guillermo Vallori =

Spanish footballer

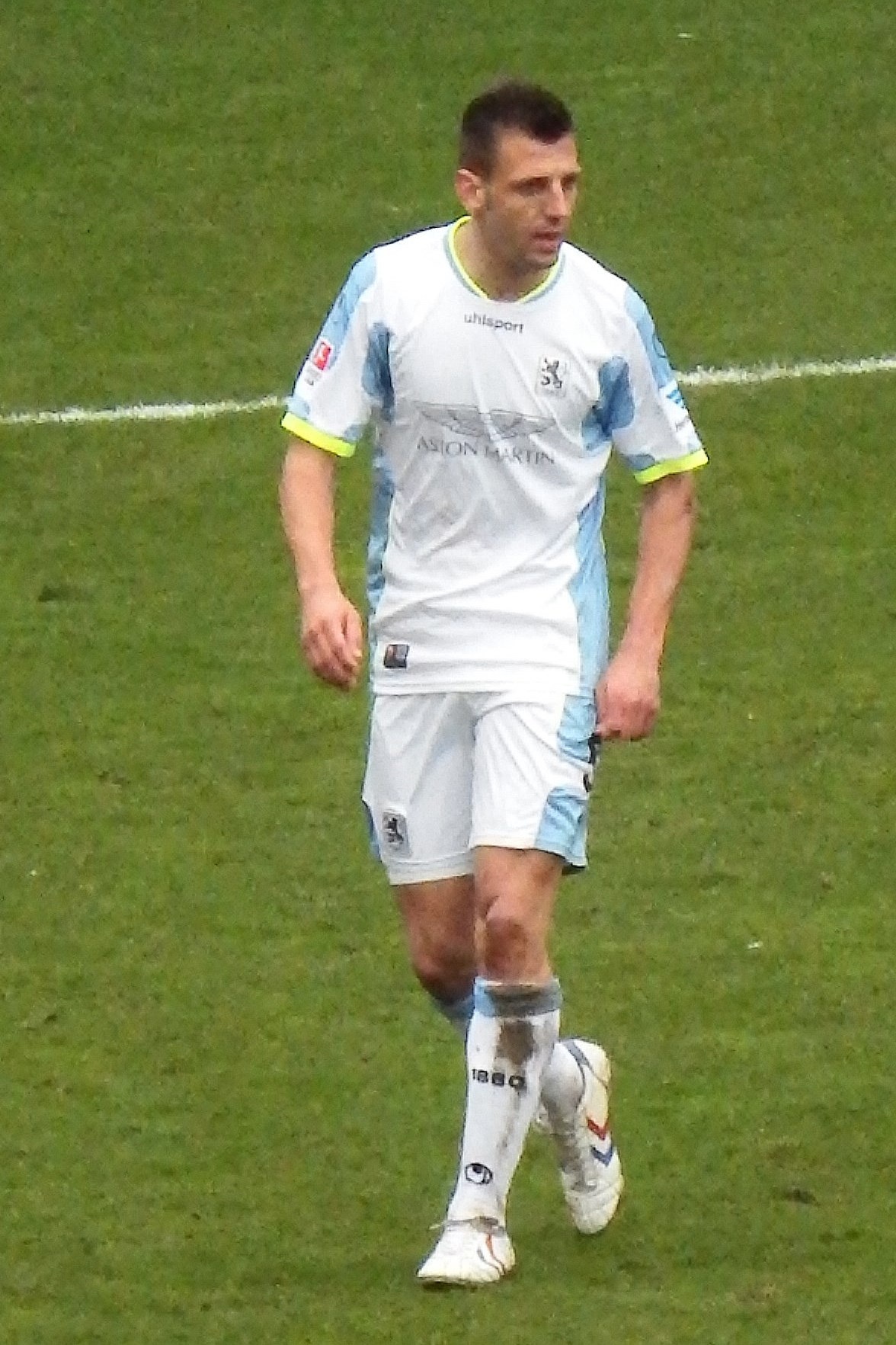
- Vallori playing for 1860 in 2013.

Personal information
- Full name: Guillermo Juan Vallori Grimalt
- Date of birth: 24 June 1982 (age 44)
- Place of birth: Palma de Mallorca, Spain
- Height: 1.91 m (6 ft 3 in)
- Position: Centre back

Youth career
- Mallorca
- → San Fernando (loan)
- → Ferriolense (loan)

Senior career*
| Years | Team | Apps | (Gls) |
| 2000–2002 | Santa Ponsa | ? | (7) |
| 2002–2004 | Mallorca B | 1 | (0) |
| 2003–2004 | → Santa Ponsa (loan) | 36 | (7) |
| 2004–2007 | Santa Eulàlia | 112 | (20) |
| 2007–2012 | Grasshopper Zurich | 141 | (6) |
| 2012–2016 | 1860 Munich | 93 | (7) |
| 2016–2020 | Atlético Baleares | 119 | (3) |
- * Club domestic league appearances and goals

Guillermo Juan Vallori Grimalt (born 24 June 1982) is a Spanish former professional footballer who played as a central defender.
