= Reiner Maurer =

German footballer (born 1960)

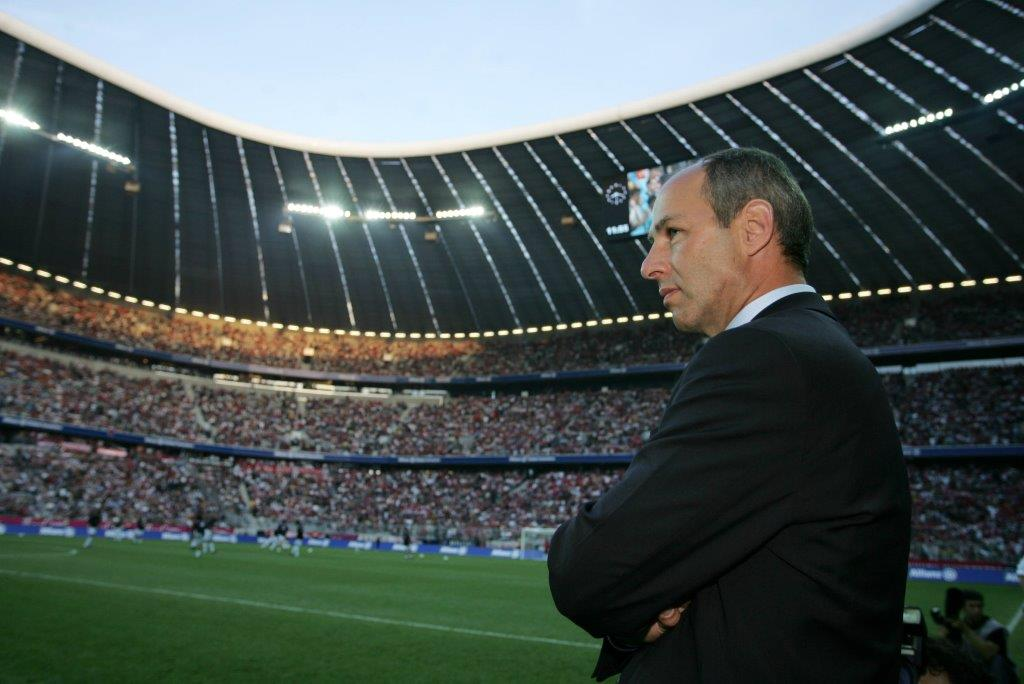
- Maurer in the Allianz Arena in 2005

Personal information
- Date of birth: 16 February 1960 (age 66)
- Place of birth: Mindelheim, West Germany
- Height: 1.83 m (6 ft 0 in)
- Position: Defender

Team information
- Current team: China (assistant coach)

Youth career
- TSV Mindelheim
- FC Memmingen

Senior career*
Years	Team	Apps	(Gls)
–1982	FC Memmingen		
1982–1983	SpVgg Unterhaching		
1983–1984	Bayern Munich	7	(0)
1984–1985	VfB Stuttgart	11	(0)
1985–1986	Karlsruher SC	25	(3)
1986–1987	Arminia Bielefeld	22	(1)
1987–1989	BSC Old Boys	51	(1)
1991–1995	1860 Munich	146	(8)
1995–1997	1. FC Garmisch-Partenkirchen		

Managerial career
- 1996–1997: 1. FC Garmisch-Partenkirchen
- 1999: 1. FC Miesbach
- 1999–2001: FC Memmingen
- 2001–2003: 1860 Munich (assistant)
- 2003–2004: 1860 Munich II
- 2004: 1860 Munich (assistant)
- 2004–2006: 1860 Munich
- 2006–2007: OFI
- 2008–2009: Kavala
- 2010: Rodos
- 2010–2012: 1860 Munich
- 2013–2014: Skoda Xanthi
- 2015–2017: Angthong
- 2019–2020: Türkgücü München
- 2021–2022: FC Augsburg (assistant)
- 2024–2025: Qingdao West Coast (assistant)
- 2026–: China (assistant)
- * Club domestic league appearances and goals

Reiner Maurer (born 16 February 1960) is a German football coach and a former player. He is the assistant coach of China national football team. Maurer played as a midfielder.

== Playing career ==
Maurer was born in Mindelheim. He spent three seasons in the Bundesliga as a player for FC Bayern Munich, VfB Stuttgart and 1860 Munich.

== Managerial career ==
=== 1860 Munich ===
Maurer was head coach of the reserve team from July 2001 to April 2004. Maurer became interim head coach when Rudi Bommer was sacked in December 2004. Maurer was sacked in January 2006.

=== Time in Greece ===
Maurer went to Greece and became head coach of OFI in July 2006. Maurer left by mutual consent in November 2007. Then Maurer was head coach of Kavala from June 2008 to November of the same year and Rodos in 2010 before moving back to 1860 Munich.

=== Return to 1860 Munich and Greece ===
Maurer was hired as 1860 Munich manager in June 2010 and was sacked in November 2012. Maurer returned to Greece when Skoda Xanthi hired him in September 2013. He stayed there for four months.

=== Thailand ===
From November 2015 to November 2017, Maurer managed Angthong.

=== China ===
In 2026, Maurer joined China national football team as assistant coach.

== Coaching record ==
As of 10 February 2014

Team	From	To	Record								
Team	From	To	G	W	D	L	GF	GA	GD	Win %	Ref.
1860 Munich II	1 July 2003	17 April 2004	28	16	4	8	53	37	+16	57.14	
1860 Munich	4 December 2004	22 January 2006	39	20	12	7	63	39	+24	51.28	
OFI	2 July 2006	12 November 2007	—								
Kavala	12 June 2008	30 November 2008	—								
Rodos	4 March 2010	26 April 2010	—								
1860 Munich	25 June 2010	18 November 2012	88	40	21	27	141	103	+38	45.45	
Skoda Xanthi	24 September 2013	5 February 2014	21	5	5	11	28	35	−7	23.81	
Angthong	5 November 2015	1 November 2017	—								

== Honours ==
- DFB-Pokal: 1983–84
