= Timo Ochs =

German footballer

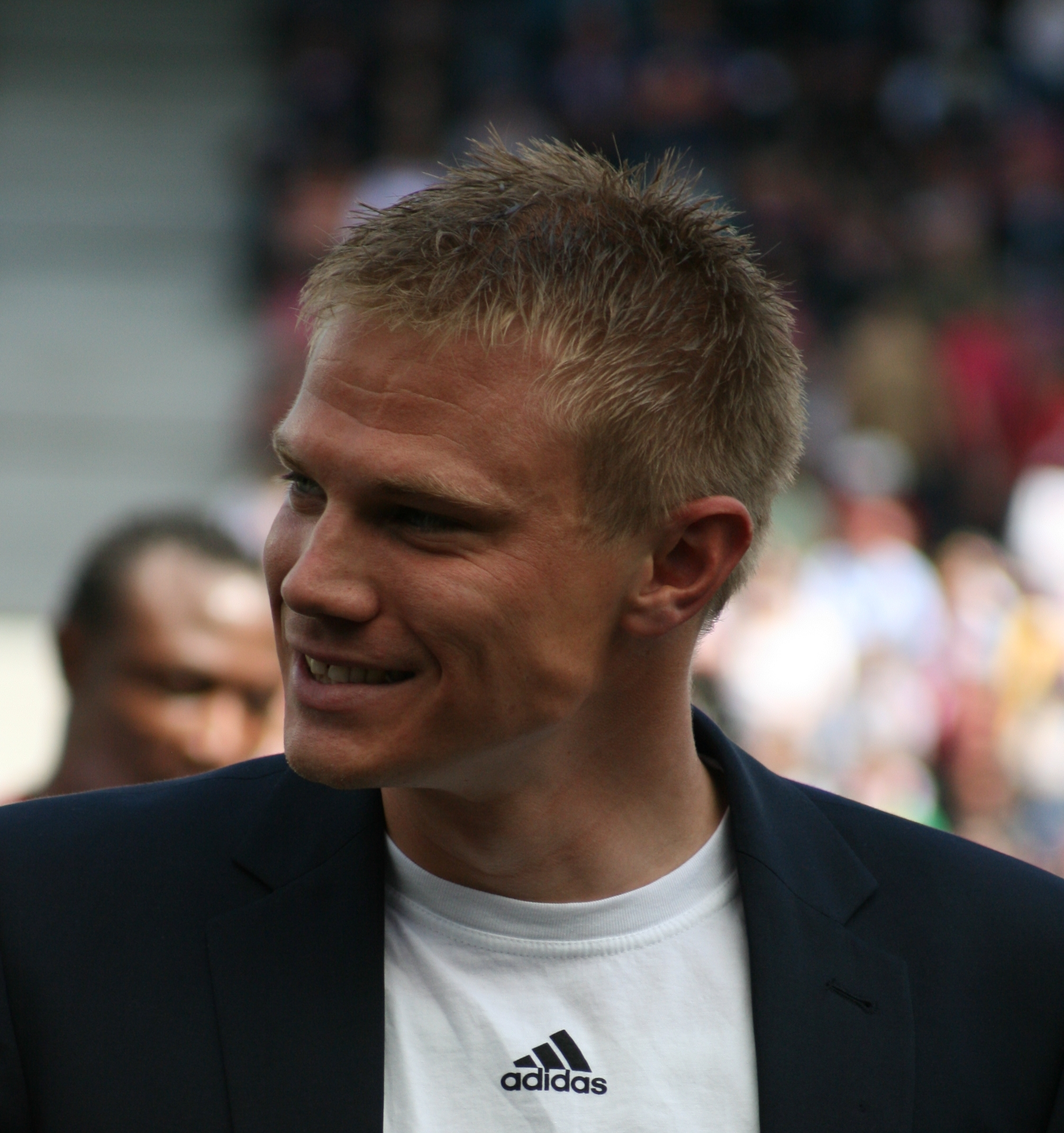
- Ochs in 2009

Personal information
- Date of birth: 17 October 1981 (age 45)
- Place of birth: Göttingen, West Germany
- Height: 1.89 m (6 ft 2 in)
- Position: Goalkeeper

Youth career
- –1996: SC Weende
- 1996–1999: Hannover 96

Senior career*
Years	Team	Apps	(Gls)
1999–2003	Hannover 96	0	(0)
2003–2004	VfL Osnabrück	25	(0)
2004–2006	1860 Munich	47	(0)
2006–2009	Red Bull Salzburg	85	(0)
2009–2010	Hertha BSC	2	(0)
2010–2011	1. FC Nürnberg	0	(0)
2010–2011	1. FC Nürnberg II	9	(0)
2011–2013	1860 Munich	1	(0)
2013	Jahn Regensburg	13	(0)
2013–2014	1. FC Saarbrücken	38	(0)
Total		220	(0)
- * Club domestic league appearances and goals

Timo Ochs (born 17 October 1981) is a German former professional footballer who played as a goalkeeper.

== Club career ==
=== Early years ===
Ochs was born in Göttingen, Lower Saxony. He joined Hannover 96 in 1996 and started his senior career with the club in 1999. However, he never managed to establish himself in the first team and left the club for 2. Bundesliga side VfL Osnabrück in 2003. At Osnabrück, he initially played understudy to Sven Scheuer, but soon managed to establish himself as the first-choice goalkeeper and was seen by many as one of the best goalkeepers in the league, despite the club's relegation at the end of the season.

=== 1860 Munich ===
In 2004, Ochs moved to 2. Bundesliga side TSV 1860 Munich, where he initially played understudy to Michael Hofmann and only made one first-team appearance in the DFB-Pokal, as well as some appearances for the club's reserves in the Regionalliga Süd, in the first half of the 2004–05 season. However, he managed to establish himself as the first-choice goalkeeper following an injury to Hofmann at the beginning of the second half of the season and kept his place between the sticks for the rest of the season, as well as the entire following season in 2005–06, when he only missed one league match.

=== Red Bull Salzburg ===
In 2006, Ochs moved to Austrian Bundesliga side Red Bull Salzburg, where he was the first-choice goalkeeper from the beginning of his contract. He helped the team win the Austrian championship in 2007 and also made several appearances in the UEFA Champions League qualifying as well as in the UEFA Cup. On 30 June 2009, Ochs left Red Bull Salzburg, when his contract expired.

=== Hertha BSC ===
On 24 September 2009, he signed for Hertha BSC, for one year to serve as a replacement for Czech international Jaroslav Drobný who was injured. His contract was not renewed after Hertha were relegated.

=== 1. FC Nürnberg ===
After almost half a season without a club, Ochs signed for 1. FC Nürnberg on 27 November 2010.

=== 1860 Munich (second stint) ===
On 6 June 2011, Ochs signed on with 1860 Munich.

=== Jahn Regensburg ===
On 23 January 2013, Ochs moved to 2. Bundesliga team SSV Jahn Regensburg.

=== 1. FC Saarbrücken ===
Ochs signed for 1. FC Saarbrücken in the summer of 2013. He left the club after one season after they were relegated from the 3. Liga.

== International career ==
Ochs was part of the Germany under-21 national team at the finals of the UEFA U-21 Championship 2004, but did not play any matches at the tournament.

== Honours ==
- Austrian Bundesliga: 2006–07, 2008–09
