= Arne Feick =

German footballer (born 1988)

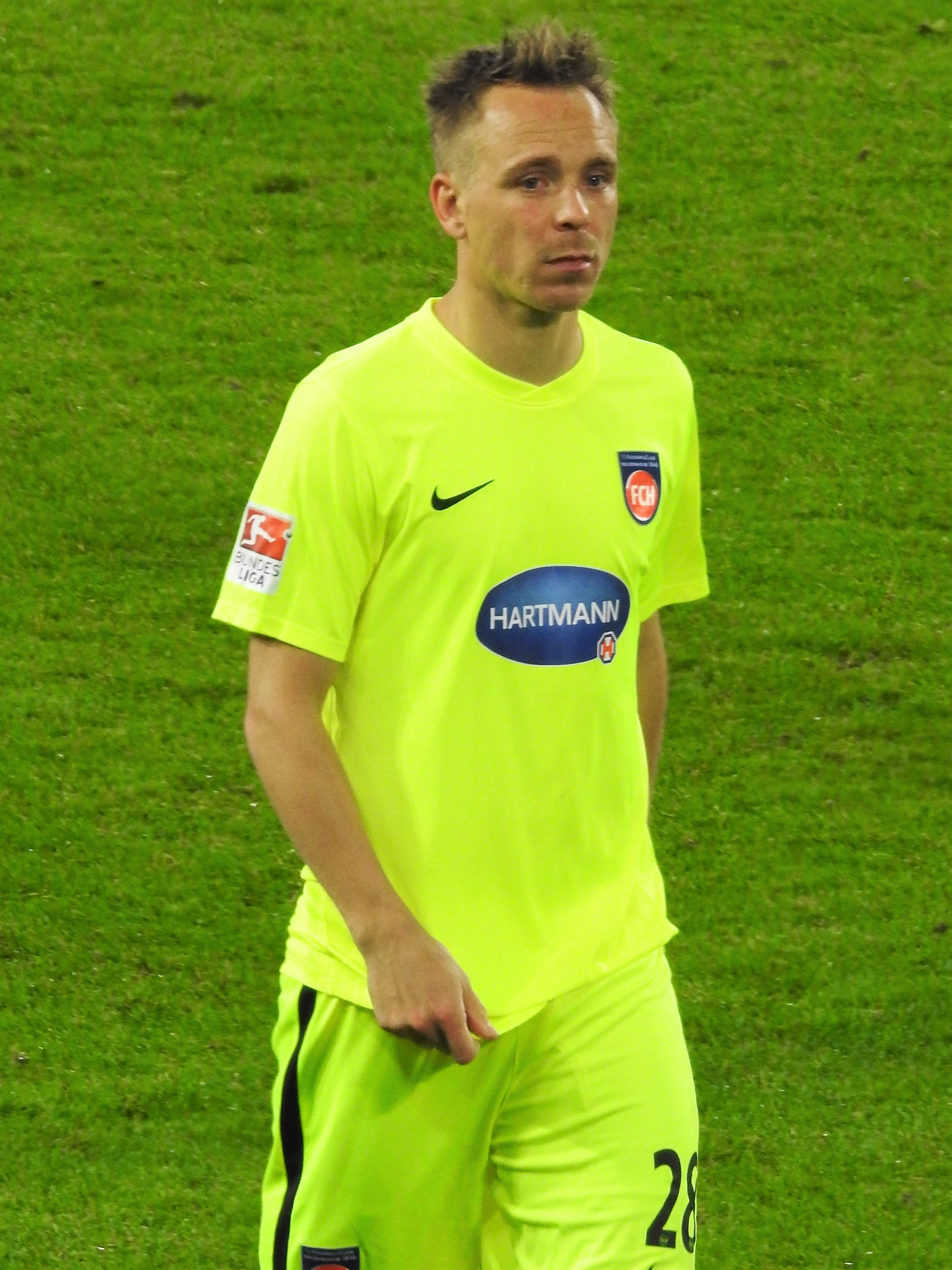
- Feick with 1. FC Heidenheim in 2017

Personal information
- Date of birth: 1 April 1988 (age 38)
- Place of birth: East Berlin, East Germany
- Height: 1.79 m (5 ft 10 in)
- Positions: Left-back; left midfielder

Youth career
- 1994–2000: SV Mühlenbeck 47
- 2000–2002: SC Oberhavel Velten
- 2002–2006: Energie Cottbus

Senior career*
Years	Team	Apps	(Gls)
2005–2008	Energie Cottbus II	59	(2)
2006–2008	Energie Cottbus	2	(0)
2008–2009	Erzgebirge Aue	33	(10)
2009–2011	Arminia Bielefeld	50	(2)
2011–2013	1860 Munich	29	(0)
2013–2014	Arminia Bielefeld	26	(0)
2014–2015	VfR Aalen	30	(1)
2015–2020	1. FC Heidenheim	115	(10)
2020–2021	Würzburger Kickers	31	(2)
Total		375	(27)

International career
2006–2007	Germany U19	17	(0)
2007–2009	Germany U20	6	(1)
- * Club domestic league appearances and goals

Arne Feick (born 1 April 1988) is a German former professional footballer who played as a left-back and left midfielder.

== Club career ==
Born in East Berlin, Feick started playing football at SV Mühlenbeck 47 in 1994 and moved to the SC Oberhavel Velten youth department in 2000. In the summer of 2002, he joined the youth academy of Energie Cottbus.

For the 2005–06 season, he managed to make the cut to the second team, Energie Cottbus II, that played in the Oberliga. The team managed to reach promotion to the Regionalliga. However, qualification for the new 3. Liga in the 2007–08 season was clearly missed. After midfielder Markus Dworrak's move to Dynamo Dresden, Feick signed his first professional contract in September 2006. He made his debut in the Bundesliga on 26 November 2006, under head coach Petrik Sander where he came on as a substitute in the 85th minute in a match against Bayer Leverkusen. On 2 December, Feick made his debut in the starting eleven against Hannover 96 and was sent off in the 90th minute with his second yellow card. He was able to make one more league appearance during the season. In the 2007–08 season, Feick only appeared for the second team.

After the second team had clearly failed to qualify for the new 3. Liga, Feick signed a two-year contract with Erzgebirge Aue, competing in the 3. Liga, ahead of the 2008–09 season alongside former Energie Cottbus teammates Martin Männel, Jan Hochscheidt and Marc Hensel. There, he was able to establish himself as a regular starter and became top goalscorer for the club in his first season.

For the 2009–10 season, Feick moved to Arminia Bielefeld in the 2. Bundesliga, signing a three-year contract. After Arminia suffered relegation at the end of the 2010–11 season, Feick moved to 1860 Munich. In the 2011–12 season, he made 20 appearances, during which he was sidelined from the end of November until the end of the winter break due to an injury. In the following season, he was only utilised as a complementary player, not appearing in the 2. Bundesliga. He was part of a matchday squad 18 times during that season, but nevertheless did not play. He made seven appearances for the second team in the Regionalliga Bayern.

After two years, in September 2013, Feick returned to Arminia Bielefeld, who had been promoted to the 2. Bundesliga again. There. he was promoted to a regular starter and played in 24 of the remaining 28 games of the season. However, Arminia suffered another relegation at the end of the season after losing in the relegation play-offs to Darmstadt 98.

For the following season 2014–15, Feick moved to 2. Bundesliga team VfR Aalen, whom he left again at the end of the season and signed a contract with local rivals 1. FC Heidenheim. On 29 July 2016, he extended his contract with 1. FC Heidenheim until 2020.

After his contract expired in July 2020, Feick moved to recently promoted 2. Bundesliga club Würzburger Kickers. He signed a contract until 30 June 2021. He left the club as his contract expired and subsequently retired from football.

== International career ==
Feick is a youth international for Germany.
