= List of German football transfers summer 2013 =

This is a list of German football transfers in the summer transfer window 2013 by club. Only transfers of the Bundesliga, and 2. Bundesliga are included.

== Bundesliga ==
=== Bayern Munich ===
In:

Out:

Note: Flags indicate national team as has been defined under FIFA eligibility rules. Players may hold more than one non-FIFA nationality.

No.	Pos.	Nation	Player
6	MF	ESP	Thiago (from Barcelona)
15	DF	GER	Jan Kirchhoff (from 1. FSV Mainz 05)
19	MF	GER	Mario Götze (from Borussia Dortmund)

No.	Pos.	Nation	Player
24	GK	GER	Maximilian Riedmüller (to Holstein Kiel)
33	FW	GER	Mario Gómez (to Fiorentina)
44	MF	UKR	Anatoliy Tymoshchuk (to Zenit St. Petersburg)
24	FW	GER	Nils Petersen (to Werder Bremen, previously on loan)
30	MF	BRA	Luiz Gustavo (to VfL Wolfsburg)
36	MF	GER	Emre Can (to Bayer Leverkusen)

=== Borussia Dortmund ===
In:

No.	Pos.	Nation	Player
10	MF	ARM	Henrikh Mkhitaryan (from Shakhtar Donetsk)
17	FW	GAB	Pierre-Emerick Aubameyang (from AS Saint-Étienne)
25	DF	GRE	Sokratis Papastathopoulos (from Werder Bremen)

Out:

No.	Pos.	Nation	Player
7	MF	GER	Moritz Leitner (on loan to VfB Stuttgart)
10	MF	GER	Mario Götze (to Bayern Munich)
27	DF	BRA	Felipe Santana (to FC Schalke 04)
32	MF	GER	Leonardo Bittencourt (to Hannover 96)
11	FW	GER	Daniel Ginczek (to 1. FC Nürnberg, previously on loan at FC St. Pauli)
22	DF	GER	Julian Koch (to 1. FSV Mainz 05, previously on loan at MSV Duisburg)
31	MF	GER	Marvin Bakalorz (to Eintracht Frankfurt)
--	DF	GER	Lasse Sobiech (to Hamburger SV, previously on loan at SpVgg Greuther Fürth)

=== Bayer 04 Leverkusen ===
In:

No.	Pos.	Nation	Player
2	DF	GRE	Kostas Stafylidis (from PAOK)
5	MF	BIH	Emir Spahić (from Sevilla FC)
7	FW	KOR	Son Heung-Min (from Hamburger SV)
9	FW	SUI	Eren Derdiyok (on loan from 1899 Hoffenheim)
14	MF	GER	Roberto Hilbert (from Beşiktaş J.K.)
10	MF	GER	Emre Can (from Bayern Munich)
23	FW	AUS	Robbie Kruse (from Fortuna Düsseldorf)
25	GK	ESP	Andrés Palop (from Sevilla FC)
26	DF	ITA	Giulio Donati (from Inter Milan, previously on loan at US Grosseto)
--	MF	COL	Michael Javier Ortega (loan return from VfL Bochum)
--	FW	FIN	Joel Pohjanpalo (on loan from HJK Helsinki)

Out:

No.	Pos.	Nation	Player
2	DF	GER	Daniel Schwaab (to VfB Stuttgart)
7	FW	CHI	Junior Fernándes (on loan to Dinamo Zagreb)
9	FW	GER	Andre Schurrle (to Chelsea)
14	DF	JPN	Hajime Hosogai (to Hertha BSC)
16	FW	POL	Arkadiusz Milik (on loan to FC Augsburg)
20	DF	ESP	Dani Carvajal (to Real Madrid)
24	DF	CZE	Michal Kadlec (to Fenerbahçe S.K.)
33	GK	GER	Michael Rensing (to Fortuna Düsseldorf)
38	MF	GER	Karim Bellarabi (on loan to Eintracht Braunschweig)
--	MF	GER	Christoph Kramer (on loan to Borussia Mönchengladbach, previously on loan at VfL Bochum)
--	FW	FIN	Joel Pohjanpalo (on loan to VfR Aalen)

=== FC Schalke 04 ===
In:

No.	Pos.	Nation	Player
2	DF	GER	Tim Hoogland (loan return from VfB Stuttgart)
5	DF	BRA	Felipe Santana (from Borussia Dortmund)
8	MF	GER	Leon Goretzka (from VfL Bochum)
9	MF	GHA	Kevin-Prince Boateng (from AC Milan)
11	FW	GER	Christian Clemens (from 1. FC Köln)
15	DF	GER	Dennis Aogo (on loan from Hamburger SV)
28	FW	HUN	Ádám Szalai (from 1. FSV Mainz 05)

Out:

No.	Pos.	Nation	Player
9	FW	BRA	Michel Bastos (loan return to Olympique Lyon)
18	MF	BRA	Raffael (loan return to Dynamo Kyiv)
20	FW	FIN	Teemu Pukki (to Celtic F.C.)
21	DF	GER	Christoph Metzelder (retired)
27	MF	SUI	Tranquillo Barnetta (on loan to Eintracht Frankfurt)
28	MF	GER	Christoph Moritz (to 1. FSV Mainz 05)
29	FW	GER	Philipp Hofmann (on loan to FC Ingolstadt 04)
37	MF	ESP	Manuel Torres (to Karlsruher SC)
--	MF	ESP	José Manuel Jurado (to Spartak Moscow, previously on loan)

=== SC Freiburg ===
In:

No.	Pos.	Nation	Player
4	MF	SUI	Gelson Fernandes (from Sporting CP)
5	DF	FRA	Christopher Jullien (from AJ Auxerre)
7	MF	CZE	Vladimír Darida (from Viktoria Plzeň)
8	MF	CZE	Václav Pilař (on loan from VfL Wolfsburg)
9	FW	GER	Mike Hanke (from Borussia Mönchengladbach)
13	MF	GER	Nicolas Höfler (loan return from FC Erzgebirge Aue)
14	FW	SUI	Admir Mehmedi (on loan from Dynamo Kyiv)
20	MF	FRA	Francis Coquelin (on loan from Arsenal)
36	MF	GER	Felix Klaus (from SpVgg Greuther Fürth)
--	DF	SLO	Denis Perger (from FC Koper)

Out:

No.	Pos.	Nation	Player
7	MF	COD	Cédric Makiadi (to Werder Bremen)
8	MF	GER	Jan Rosenthal (to Eintracht Frankfurt)
9	FW	CRO	Ivan Santini (loan return to NK Zadar)
18	MF	GER	Johannes Flum (to Eintracht Frankfurt)
20	MF	GER	Max Kruse (to Borussia Mönchengladbach)
26	FW	SVK	Erik Jendrišek (to Energie Cottbus)
32	MF	GER	Marc Lais (to SV Sandhausen)
40	MF	GER	Daniel Caligiuri (to VfL Wolfsburg)
--	FW	GER	Simon Brandstetter (to FC Rot-Weiß Erfurt, previously on loan at Karlsruher SC)
--	DF	SUI	Beg Ferati (to FC Sion, previously on loan at FC Winterthur)
--	DF	SLO	Denis Perger (on loan at SV Wehen Wiesbaden)

=== Eintracht Frankfurt ===
In:

No.	Pos.	Nation	Player
7	MF	GER	Jan Rosenthal (from SC Freiburg)
9	FW	ESP	Joselu (on loan from 1899 Hoffenheim)
17	DF	PHI	Stephan Schröck (from 1899 Hoffenheim)
18	MF	GER	Johannes Flum (from SC Freiburg)
19	MF	GER	Marvin Bakalorz (from Borussia Dortmund)
25	MF	SUI	Tranquillo Barnetta (on loan from FC Schalke 04)
30	GK	GER	Felix Wiedwald (from MSV Duisburg)

Out:

No.	Pos.	Nation	Player
1	GK	MKD	Oka Nikolov (to Philadelphia Union)
2	DF	GER	Heiko Butscher (to VfL Bochum)
5	DF	GER	Martin Amedick (to SC Paderborn 07)
9	FW	CAN	Olivier Occéan (on loan to 1. FC Kaiserslautern)
21	MF	ALG	Karim Matmour (to 1. FC Kaiserslautern)
39	DF	GER	Julian Dudda (to Werder Bremen II)

=== Hamburger SV ===
In:

No.	Pos.	Nation	Player
5	DF	SUI	Johan Djourou (on loan from Arsenal, previously on loan at Hannover 96)
16	DF	GER	Lasse Sobiech (from Borussia Dortmund, previously on loan at SpVgg Greuther Fürth)
20	FW	GER	Pierre-Michel Lasogga (on loan from Hertha BSC)
27	MF	TUR	Kerem Demirbay (from Borussia Dortmund II)
31	FW	CMR	Jacques Zoua (from FC Basel)

Out:

No.	Pos.	Nation	Player
6	DF	GER	Dennis Aogo (on loan to FC Schalke 04)
16	FW	SWE	Marcus Berg (to Panathinaikos F.C.)
22	DF	ITA	Jacopo Sala (to Hellas Verona F.C.)
25	MF	NOR	Per Ciljan Skjelbred (on loan to Hertha BSC)
40	FW	KOR	Son Heung-Min (to Bayer 04 Leverkusen)
--	DF	AUT	Paul Scharner (retired, previously on loan at Wigan Athletic)

=== Borussia Mönchengladbach ===
In:

No.	Pos.	Nation	Player
10	MF	GER	Max Kruse (from SC Freiburg)
11	MF	BRA	Raffael (from Dynamo Kyiv, previously on loan at FC Schalke 04)
23	MF	GER	Christoph Kramer (on loan from Bayer Leverkusen, previously on loan at VfL Bochum)

Out:

No.	Pos.	Nation	Player
5	MF	FIN	Alexander Ring (loan return to HJK)
6	MF	GER	Tolga Ciğerci (loan return to VfL Wolfsburg)
19	FW	GER	Mike Hanke (to SC Freiburg)
37	DF	GER	Niklas Dams (to Servette FC)
--	FW	BEL	Igor de Camargo (to 1899 Hoffenheim, previously on loan)
--	FW	AUS	Mathew Leckie (to FSV Frankfurt, previously on loan)
--	DF	GER	Matthias Zimmermann (on loan to SV Sandhausen, previously on loan at SpVgg Greuther Fürth)

=== Hannover 96 ===
In:

No.	Pos.	Nation	Player
5	DF	SEN	Salif Sané (from AS Nancy)
7	MF	RUS	Edgar Prib (from SpVgg Greuther Fürth)
21	GK	GER	Konstantin Fuhry (from VfB Stuttgart youth)
25	DF	BRA	Marcelo (from PSV Eindhoven)
32	MF	GER	Leonardo Bittencourt (from Borussia Dortmund)

Out:

No.	Pos.	Nation	Player
3	DF	TUN	Karim Haggui (to VfB Stuttgart)
5	DF	SUI	Mario Eggimann (to 1. FC Union Berlin)
7	MF	POR	Sérgio Pinto (to UD Levante)
17	DF	SUI	Johan Djourou (loan return to Arsenal)
21	GK	AUT	Samuel Radlinger (on loan to Rapid Wien)
25	FW	NOR	Mohammed Abdellaoue (to VfB Stuttgart)
34	DF	GER	Konstantin Rausch (to VfB Stuttgart)
37	MF	GER	Sascha Schünemann (to Hansa Rostock)
38	MF	GER	Niko Gießelmann (to SpVgg Greuther Fürth)
--	MF	AUT	Daniel Royer (to Austria Wien, previously on loan at 1. FC Köln)

=== 1. FC Nürnberg ===
In:

No.	Pos.	Nation	Player
2	DF	AUT	Emanuel Pogatetz (from VfL Wolfsburg, previously on loan at West Ham United)
6	DF	SUI	Martin Angha (from Arsenal)
8	FW	POL	Mariusz Stępiński (form Widzew Łódź)
11	FW	GER	Daniel Ginczek (from Borussia Dortmund, previously on loan at FC St. Pauli)
18	FW	SUI	Josip Drmić (from FC Zürich)
31	FW	GER	Nick Weber (from Borussia Dortmund youth)
--	DF	JPN	Makoto Hasebe (from VfL Wolfsburg)

Out:

No.	Pos.	Nation	Player
2	DF	BEL	Timmy Simons (to Club Brugge K.V.)
15	DF	SUI	Timm Klose (to VfL Wolfsburg)
28	MF	JPN	Mu Kanazaki (to Portimonense S.C.)
--	MF	GER	Manuel Zeitz (to SC Paderborn 07, previously on loan)
--	MF	GER	Julian Wießmeier (on loan to Wehen Wiesbaden, previously on loan at Jahn Regensburg)
--	MF	ISR	Almog Cohen (to FC Ingolstadt 04, previously on loan at Hapoel Tel Aviv)

=== VfL Wolfsburg ===
In:

No.	Pos.	Nation	Player
5	DF	SUI	Timm Klose (from 1. FC Nürnberg)
7	MF	GER	Daniel Caligiuri (from SC Freiburg)
20	GK	GER	Max Grün (from SpVgg Greuther Fürth)
22	MF	BRA	Luiz Gustavo (from Bayern Munich)
24	FW	GER	Kevin Scheidhauer (loan return from VfL Bochum)
26	DF	BRA	Felipe Lopes (loan return from VfB Stuttgart)
30	FW	GER	Stefan Kutschke (from RB Leipzig)

Out:

No.	Pos.	Nation	Player
5	DF	AUT	Emanuel Pogatetz (to 1. FC Nürnberg, previously on loan at West Ham United)
13	DF	JPN	Makoto Hasebe (to 1. FC Nürnberg)
14	MF	CZE	Václav Pilař (on loan to SC Freiburg)
17	FW	CIV	Giovanni Sio (to FC Basel)
28	FW	SWE	Rasmus Jönsson (on loan to AaB)
30	MF	VEN	Yohandry Orozco (to Deportivo Táchira)
32	DF	BRA	Fagner (on loan to Vasco da Gama)
33	FW	GER	Patrick Helmes (to 1. FC Köln)
35	GK	SUI	Marwin Hitz (to FC Augsburg)
37	MF	MKD	Ferhan Hasani (to Brøndby IF)
40	DF	DEN	Simon Kjær (to Lille OSC)
--	DF	GER	Michael Schulze (to Energie Cottbus, previously on loan)
--	MF	POL	Mateusz Klich (to PEC Zwolle, previously on loan)
--	MF	GER	Akaki Gogia (to Hallescher FC, previously on loan at FC St. Pauli)
--	MF	GER	Tolga Ciğerci (to Hertha BSC, previously on loan at Borussia Mönchengladbach)
--	FW	KOR	Park Jung-Bin (to Karlsruher SC, previously on loan at SpVgg Greuther Fürth)

=== VfB Stuttgart ===
In:

No.	Pos.	Nation	Player
2	DF	JPN	Gotoku Sakai (from Albirex Niigata, previously on loan)
3	DF	GER	Daniel Schwaab (from Bayer 04 Leverkusen)
5	DF	TUN	Karim Haggui (from Hannover 96)
8	MF	GER	Moritz Leitner (on loan from Borussia Dortmund)
14	MF	NZL	Marco Rojas (from Melbourne Victory FC)
22	GK	GER	Thorsten Kirschbaum (from FC Energie Cottbus)
23	MF	TUR	Sercan Sararer (from SpVgg Greuther Fürth)
25	FW	NOR	Mohammed Abdellaoue (from Hannover 96)
34	DF	GER	Konstantin Rausch (from Hannover 96)

Out:

No.	Pos.	Nation	Player
3	DF	BRA	Felipe Lopes (loan return to VfL Wolfsburg)
5	DF	GER	Serdar Tasci (to Spartak Moscow)
11	FW	FRA	Johan Audel (on loan to FC Nantes)
14	FW	ITA	Federico Macheda (loan return to Manchester United F.C.)
19	MF	AUT	Kevin Stöger (on loan to 1. FC Kaiserslautern)
22	GK	GER	Marc Ziegler (retired)
23	DF	GER	Tim Hoogland (loan return to FC Schalke 04)
26	MF	AUT	Raphael Holzhauser (on loan to FC Augsburg)
29	FW	GER	Soufian Benyamina (to Dynamo Dresden)
30	MF	HUN	Tamás Hajnal (to FC Ingolstadt 04)
31	FW	JPN	Shinji Okazaki (to 1. FSV Mainz 05)
33	GK	GER	André Weis (to FC Ingolstadt 04)
38	DF	GER	Michael Vitzthum (on loan to Karlsruher SC)

=== 1. FSV Mainz 05 ===
In:

No.	Pos.	Nation	Player
6	MF	GER	Johannes Geis (from SpVgg Greuther Fürth)
8	MF	GER	Christoph Moritz (from FC Schalke 04)
18	FW	GER	Dani Schahin (from Fortuna Düsseldorf)
22	DF	GER	Julian Koch (from Borussia Dortmund, previously on loan at MSV Duisburg)
23	FW	JPN	Shinji Okazaki (from VfB Stuttgart)
24	DF	KOR	Park Joo-Ho (from FC Basel)

Out:

No.	Pos.	Nation	Player
6	MF	GER	Marco Caligiuri (to Eintracht Braunschweig)
8	DF	SVK	Radoslav Zabavník (to SV Sandhausen)
13	FW	AUS	Nikita Rukavytsya (on loan to FSV Frankfurt)
15	DF	GER	Jan Kirchhoff (to FC Bayern Munich)
23	MF	GER	Marcel Risse (to 1. FC Köln)
25	MF	AUT	Andreas Ivanschitz (to Levante UD)
28	FW	HUN	Ádám Szalai (to FC Schalke 04)
--	DF	GER	Fabian Schönheim (to 1. FC Union Berlin, previously on loan)
--	FW	NGR	Anthony Ujah (to 1. FC Köln, previously on loan)
--	FW	TUR	Deniz Yılmaz (to Sanica Boru Elazığspor, previously on loan at SC Paderborn 07)

=== Werder Bremen ===
In:

No.	Pos.	Nation	Player
2	DF	ARG	Santiago García
3	DF	ITA	Luca Caldirola (from Inter Milan)
6	MF	COD	Cédric Makiadi (from SC Freiburg)
24	FW	GER	Nils Petersen (from Bayern Munich, previously on loan)
—	FW	ARG	Franco Di Santo (from Wigan Athletic)

Out:

No.	Pos.	Nation	Player
6	MF	BEL	Kevin De Bruyne (loan return to Chelsea F.C.)
7	FW	AUT	Marko Arnautović (to Stoke City)
9	FW	SWE	Denni Avdić (to AZ Alkmaar)
19	FW	NGR	Joseph Akpala (on loan to Karabükspor)
22	DF	GRE	Sokratis Papastathopoulos (to Borussia Dortmund)
26	DF	GER	Florian Hartherz (to SC Paderborn 07)
27	FW	GER	Johannes Wurtz (to SC Paderborn 07)
33	GK	GER	Christian Vander (retired)
41	FW	GER	Niclas Füllkrug (on loan to SpVgg Greuther Fürth)

=== FC Augsburg ===
In:

No.	Pos.	Nation	Player
7	MF	TUR	Halil Altıntop (from Trabzonspor)
8	MF	AUT	Raphael Holzhauser (on loan from VfB Stuttgart)
11	MF	GRE	Panagiotis Vlachodimos (on loan from Olympiacos F.C.)
9	FW	POL	Arkadiusz Milik (on loan from Bayer 04 Leverkusen)
20	DF	KOR	Hong Jeong-Ho (from Jeju United)
21	FW	GER	Mathias Fetsch (from Kickers Offenbach)
25	FW	ARG	Raúl Bobadilla (from FC Basel)
35	GK	GER	Marwin Hitz (from VfL Wolfsburg)

Out:

No.	Pos.	Nation	Player
8	FW	ZIM	Knowledge Musona (loan return to 1899 Hoffenheim)
9	FW	GER	Torsten Oehrl (to Eintracht Braunschweig)
11	FW	CZE	Milan Petržela (to FC Viktoria Plzeň)
15	DF	GER	Sebastian Langkamp (to Hertha BSC)
23	FW	BFA	Aristide Bancé (on loan to Fortuna Düsseldorf)
31	MF	GER	Marco Thiede (to SV Sandhausen)
36	FW	GER	Stephan Hain (to TSV 1860 München)

=== 1899 Hoffenheim ===
In:

No.	Pos.	Nation	Player
10	FW	BEL	Igor de Camargo (from Borussia Mönchengladbach, previously on loan)
14	FW	NOR	Tarik Elyounoussi (from Rosenborg BK)
18	FW	FRA	Anthony Modeste (from Girodins de Bordeaux, previously on loan at SC Bastia)
21	DF	GER	Kevin Akpoguma (from Karlsruher SC)
22	MF	BRA	Bruno Nazário (from Figueirense)
12	MF	GER	Tobias Strobl (loan return from 1. FC Köln)
--	MF	GER	Denis Streker (loan return from Dynamo Dresden)
--	GK	GER	Marvin Schwäbe (from Eintracht Frankfurt youth)

Out:

No.	Pos.	Nation	Player
10	FW	BEL	Igor de Camargo (to Standard Liège)
11	FW	SUI	Eren Derdiyok (on loan to Bayer 04 Leverkusen)
13	MF	USA	Danny Williams (to Reading F.C.)
18	FW	ESP	Joselu (on loan to Eintracht Frankfurt)
24	FW	AUT	Michael Gregoritsch (on loan to FC St. Pauli)
25	DF	PER	Luis Advíncula (to Ponte Preta)
27	MF	LIE	Sandro Wieser (on loan to SV Ried)
33	MF	JPN	Takashi Usami (loan return to Gamba Osaka)
34	GK	BRA	Heurelho Gomes (loan return to Tottenham Hotspur)
40	DF	PHI	Stephan Schröck (to Eintracht Frankfurt)
41	MF	GHA	Afriyie Acquah (on loan to Parma F.C.)
--	FW	ZIM	Knowledge Musona (on loan to Kaizer Chiefs, previously on loan at FC Augsburg)

=== Hertha BSC ===
In:

No.	Pos.	Nation	Player
7	DF	JPN	Hajime Hosogai (from Bayer 04 Leverkusen)
9	MF	GER	Alexander Baumjohann (from 1. FC Kaiserslautern)
13	MF	NOR	Per Ciljan Skjelbred (on loan from Hamburger SV)
15	DF	GER	Sebastian Langkamp (from FC Augsburg)
17	MF	GER	Tolga Ciğerci (from VfL Wolfsburg, previously on loan at Borussia Mönchengladbach)
23	DF	GER	Johannes van den Bergh (from Fortuna Düsseldorf)

Out:

No.	Pos.	Nation	Player
4	DF	CZE	Roman Hubník (to Viktoria Plzeň)
19	FW	GER	Pierre-Michel Lasogga (on loan to Hamburger SV)
22	DF	GER	Felix Bastians (on loan to VfL Bochum)
27	MF	USA	Alfredo Morales (to FC Ingolstadt 04)
29	MF	GER	Marvin Knoll (to SV Sandhausen)
31	DF	GER	Shervin Radjabali-Fardi (to Hansa Rostock)
--	MF	AUT	Daniel Beichler (to Sturm Graz, previously on loan at SV Sandhausen)
--	FW	AUT	Marco Djuricin (to Sturm Graz, previously on loan at Jahn Regensburg)

=== Eintracht Braunschweig ===
In:

No.	Pos.	Nation	Player
11	MF	GER	Jan Hochscheidt (from FC Erzgebirge Aue)
14	MF	NOR	Omar Elabdellaoui (from Manchester City F.C., previously on loan)
18	FW	CAN	Simeon Jackson (from Norwich City)
20	FW	GER	Torsten Oehrl (from FC Augsburg)
24	MF	GER	Timo Perthel (from MSV Duisburg)
33	MF	GER	Marco Caligiuri (from 1. FSV Mainz 05)
38	MF	GER	Karim Bellarabi (on loan from Bayer 04 Leverkusen)

Out:

No.	Pos.	Nation	Player
7	MF	GER	Björn Kluft (on loan to SV Sandhausen)
13	MF	GER	Raffael Korte (on loan to 1. FC Saarbrücken)
16	DF	TUR	Emre Turan (to Berliner AK 07)
18	MF	GER	Oliver Petersch (to Arminia Bielefeld)
21	FW	GER	Pierre Merkel (to Hallescher FC)

== 2. Bundesliga ==
=== Fortuna Düsseldorf ===
In:

No.	Pos.	Nation	Player
1	GK	GER	Michael Rensing (from Bayer 04 Leverkusen)
8	DF	KAZ	Heinrich Schmidtgal (from SpVgg Greuther Fürth)
6	DF	GER	Dustin Bomheuer (from MSV Duisburg)
10	MF	GEO	Levan Kenia (from Karpaty Lviv)
23	FW	AUS	Ben Halloran (from Brisbane Roar)
30	FW	BFA	Aristide Bancé (on loan from FC Augsburg)
35	FW	NED	Charlison Benschop (from Stade Brestois 29)

Out:

No.	Pos.	Nation	Player
1	GK	AUT	Robert Almer (to Energie Cottbus)
10	MF	DEN	Ken Ilsø (to VfL Bochum)
18	MF	GER	Ronny Garbuschewski (to Chemnitzer FC)
20	FW	GER	Dani Schahin (to 1. FSV Mainz 05)
21	DF	GER	Johannes van den Bergh (to Hertha BSC)
23	FW	AUS	Robbie Kruse (to Bayer 04 Leverkusen)
--	MF	GER	André Fomitschow (on loan to Energie Cottbus, previously on loan)

=== SpVgg Greuther Fürth ===
In:

No.	Pos.	Nation	Player
3	DF	HUN	Zsolt Korcsmár (from SK Brann)
6	MF	FIN	Tim Sparv (from FC Groningen)
9	FW	SRB	Ognjen Mudrinski (from Red Star Belgrade)
11	FW	GER	Dominick Drexler (from Rot-Weiß Erfurt)
14	MF	GER	Tom Weilandt (from Hansa Rostock)
16	MF	SLO	Goran Šukalo (from MSV Duisburg)
20	MF	GER	Daniel Brosinski (from MSV Duisburg)
22	FW	GER	Niclas Füllkrug (on loan from Werder Bremen)
23	DF	GER	Kevin Schulze (from VfL Wolfsburg II)
30	GK	NED	Mark Flekken (from Alemannia Aachen)
31	MF	GER	Niko Gießelmann (from Hannover 96)

Out:

No.	Pos.	Nation	Player
2	DF	GER	Lasse Sobiech (loan return to Borussia Dortmund)
6	DF	KAZ	Heinrich Schmidtgal (to Fortuna Düsseldorf)
7	MF	GER	Bernd Nehrig (to FC St. Pauli)
9	FW	GER	Christopher Nöthe (to FC St. Pauli)
11	FW	GER	Gerald Asamoah (to FC Schalke 04 II)
13	MF	MNE	Milorad Peković (to Hansa Rostock)
14	MF	GER	Edgar Prib (to Hannover 96)
22	MF	GRE	Athanasios Petsos (to Rapid Wien)
23	MF	TUR	Sercan Sararer (to VfB Stuttgart)
24	FW	SEN	Baye Djiby Fall (to Randers FC)
26	GK	GER	Max Grün (to VfL Wolfsburg)
30	MF	GER	Johannes Geis (to 1. FSV Mainz 05)
32	FW	KOR	Park Jung-Bin (loan return to VfL Wolfsburg)
34	MF	HUN	József Varga (loan return to Debreceni VSC)
36	MF	GER	Felix Klaus (to SC Freiburg)
38	MF	GER	Matthias Zimmermann (loan return to Borussia Mönchengladbach)

=== 1. FC Kaiserslautern ===
In:

No.	Pos.	Nation	Player
6	MF	FIN	Alexander Ring (from HJK, previously on loan at Borussia Mönchengladbach)
9	FW	GER	Simon Zoller (from VfL Osnabrück)
11	MF	NOR	Ruben Jenssen (from Tromsø IL)
16	MF	ALG	Karim Matmour (from Eintracht Frankfurt)
19	FW	GER	Marcel Gaus (from FSV Frankfurt)
20	MF	AUT	Kevin Stöger (on loan from VfB Stuttgart)
25	FW	CAN	Olivier Occéan (on loan from Eintracht Frankfurt)

Out:

No.	Pos.	Nation	Player
9	MF	GER	Alexander Baumjohann (to Hertha BSC)
14	DF	TUN	Enis Hajri (on loan to FC 08 Homburg)
19	MF	GER	Denis Linsmayer (to SV Sandhausen)
21	MF	GER	Pierre de Wit (to MSV Duisburg)
25	MF	GER	Benjamin Köhler (to 1. FC Union Berlin)
29	FW	GHA	Kwame Nsor (on loan to SV Sandhausen)
35	FW	GER	Julian Derstroff (to Borussia Dortmund II)
--	FW	ISR	Itay Shechter (to Hapoel Tel Aviv, previously on loan at Swansea City)
--	FW	GER	Richard Sukuta-Pasu (on loan to VfL Bochum, previously on loan at Sturm Graz)
--	FW	BUL	Iliyan Mitsanski (to Karlsruher SC, previously on loan at FC Ingolstadt 04)

=== FSV Frankfurt ===
In:

No.	Pos.	Nation	Player
6	MF	FIN	Joni Kauko (from FC Lahti)
11	FW	GER	Chhunly Pagenburg (from Eintracht Trier)
13	FW	AUS	Nikita Rukavytsya (from 1. FSV Mainz 05)
14	DF	CMR	Nestor Djengoue (from Chievo Verona, previously on loan at NK Zagreb)
18	MF	GER	Marcel Kandziora (from SV Sandhausen)
19	FW	GER	Markus Ziereis (from TSV 1860 München)
20	FW	AUS	Mathew Leckie (from Borussia Mönchengladbach, previously on loan)
22	FW	ALB	Odise Roshi (from 1. FC Köln, previously on loan)
26	MF	GER	Denis Epstein (from Atromitos F.C.)

Out:

No.	Pos.	Nation	Player
6	DF	GER	Anthony Jung (to RB Leipzig)
11	FW	NED	John Verhoek (loan return to Stade Rennais F.C.)
19	FW	GER	Marcel Gaus (to 1. FC Kaiserslautern)
26	MF	GER	Yannick Stark (to TSV 1860 München)

=== 1. FC Köln ===
In:

No.	Pos.	Nation	Player
4	DF	ESP	Román Golobart (from Wigan Athletic)
6	DF	BRA	Bruno Nascimento (from G.D. Estoril Praia)
9	FW	GER	Anthony Ujah (from 1. FSV Mainz 05, previously on loan)
15	DF	GER	Maximilian Thiel (from Wacker Burghausen)
16	FW	GER	Patrick Helmes (from VfL Wolfsburg)
20	MF	GER	Marcel Risse (from 1. FSV Mainz 05)
22	MF	GER	Daniel Halfar (from TSV 1860 München)
27	FW	GER	Maurice Exslager (from MSV Duisburg)
17	MF	POL	Sławomir Peszko (on loan from Parma)
31	MF	GER	Yannick Gerhardt (from 1. FC Köln U19)
35	DF	GER	Koray Kacinoglu (from 1. FC Köln II)

Out:

No.	Pos.	Nation	Player
3	DF	GER	Lukas Kübler (to SV Sandhausen)
20	MF	GER	Reinhold Yabo (to Karlsruher SC)
25	MF	AUT	Daniel Royer (loan return to Hannover 96)
27	FW	GER	Christian Clemens (to FC Schalke 04)
--	MF	GER	Tobias Strobl (loan return to 1899 Hoffenheim)
--	DF	GER	Sascha Riether (to Fulham F.C., previously on loan)
--	FW	ALB	Odise Roshi (to FSV Frankfurt, previously on loan)
--	MF	POL	Sławomir Peszko (to Parma, previously on loan at Wolverhampton Wanderers)
--	FW	SWE	Mikael Ishak (to Parma, previously on loan at FC St. Gallen)
--	DF	GER	Christian Eichner (Released)
--	DF	GER	Christopher Schorch (Released)
--	FW	GER	Stefan Maierhofer (Released)

=== 1860 Munich ===
In:

No.	Pos.	Nation	Player
16	FW	GER	Stephan Hain (from FC Augsburg)
17	DF	GER	Sebastian Hertner (from FC Schalke 04 II)
19	MF	GER	Daniel Adlung (from Energie Cottbus)
29	MF	GER	Yannick Stark (from FSV Frankfurt)
35	DF	GER	Markus Schwabl (from SpVgg Unterhaching)

Out:

No.	Pos.	Nation	Player
19	MF	GER	Sebastian Maier (to FC St. Pauli)
21	MF	GRE	Grigoris Makos (to Anorthosis Famagusta)
27	DF	GER	Arne Feick (to Arminia Bielefeld)
28	MF	GER	Daniel Halfar (to 1. FC Köln)
29	FW	GER	Markus Ziereis (to FSV Frankfurt)

=== 1. FC Union Berlin ===
In:

No.	Pos.	Nation	Player
4	DF	CRO	Roberto Punčec (from Maccabi Tel Aviv F.C., previously on loan)
9	MF	GER	Sören Brandy (from MSV Duisburg)
10	MF	GER	Martin Dausch (from VfR Aalen)
15	DF	SUI	Mario Eggimann (from Hannover 96)
18	MF	GER	Benjamin Köhler (from 1. FC Kaiserslautern)
19	MF	CRO	Damir Kreilach (from HNK Rijeka)
34	DF	GER	Fabian Schönheim (from 1. FSV Mainz 05, previously on loan)

Out:

No.	Pos.	Nation	Player
16	MF	GER	Christoph Menz (to Dynamo Dresden)

=== Energie Cottbus ===
In:

No.	Pos.	Nation	Player
1	GK	AUT	Robert Almer (from Fortuna Düsseldorf)
5	DF	BIH	Mateo Sušić (from NK Istra 1961)
18	DF	CRO	Jurica Buljat (from NK Zadar)
19	MF	SWE	Amin Affane (from Chelsea F.C., previously on loan at Roda JC Kerkrade)
20	MF	GHA	Charles Takyi (from AC Horsens)
21	MF	POL	Sebastian Mrowca (from Bayern Munich youth)
22	MF	GER	André Fomitschow (on loan from Fortuna Düsseldorf, previously on loan)
26	FW	SVK	Erik Jendrišek (from SC Freiburg)
31	GK	GER	Niclas Heimann (from VVV-Venlo)
33	DF	GER	Michael Schulze (from VfL Wolfsburg, previously on loan)

Out:

No.	Pos.	Nation	Player
1	GK	GER	Thorsten Kirschbaum (to VfB Stuttgart)
10	MF	GER	Daniel Adlung (to TSV 1860 München)
21	DF	GER	Uwe Hünemeier (to SC Paderborn 07)

=== VfR Aalen ===
In:

No.	Pos.	Nation	Player
3	DF	CAN	André Hainault (from Ross County F.C.)
--	FW	FIN	Joel Pohjanpalo (on loan from Bayer 04 Leverkusen)

Out:

No.	Pos.	Nation	Player
2	MF	GER	Martin Dausch (to 1. FC Union Berlin)
7	MF	GER	Marco Haller (to Würzburger Kickers)
14	DF	GER	Tim Kister (to SV Sandhausen)
21	MF	GER	Thorsten Schulz (to Dynamo Dresden)

=== FC St. Pauli ===
In:

No.	Pos.	Nation	Player
8	MF	GER	Bernd Nehrig (from SpVgg Greuther Fürth)
9	FW	GER	Christopher Nöthe (from SpVgg Greuther Fürth)
11	MF	GER	Marc Rzatkowski (from VfL Bochum)
12	FW	NED	John Verhoek (from Stade Rennais F.C., previously on loan at FSV Frankfurt)
14	DF	GER	Philipp Ziereis (from Jahn Regensburg)
19	FW	AUT	Michael Gregoritsch (on loan from 1899 Hoffenheim)
23	DF	GER	Marcel Halstenberg (from Borussia Dortmund II)
29	MF	GER	Sebastian Maier (from TSV 1860 München)

Out:

No.	Pos.	Nation	Player
1	GK	GER	Benedikt Pliquett (to Sturm Graz)
8	MF	GER	Florian Bruns (to Werder Bremen II)
11	FW	GER	Daniel Ginczek (loan return to Borussia Dortmund)
14	MF	GER	Akaki Gogia (loan return to VfL Wolfsburg)

=== SC Paderborn 07 ===
In:

No.	Pos.	Nation	Player
2	DF	GER	Uwe Hünemeier (from Energie Cottbus)
3	DF	GER	Fabian Scheffer (from 1. FC Nürnberg II)
6	MF	GER	Manuel Zeitz (from 1. FC Nürnberg, previously on loan)
9	FW	NED	Rick ten Voorde (from NEC)
11	FW	GER	Saliou Sané (from TSV Havelse)
20	MF	GER	Marc Vucinovic (from TSV Havelse)
22	DF	GER	Michael Heinloth (from 1. FC Nürnberg II)
25	DF	GER	Martin Amedick (from Eintracht Frankfurt)

Out:

No.	Pos.	Nation	Player
3	DF	GER	Manuel Gulde (to Karlsruher SC)
10	FW	TUR	Deniz Yılmaz (loan return to 1. FSV Mainz 05)
26	MF	GER	Massimo Ornatelli (to VfL Osnabrück)
--	DF	GER	Florian Hartherz (from Werder Bremen)
--	FW	GER	Johannes Wurtz (from Werder Bremen)

=== FC Ingolstadt 04 ===
In:

No.	Pos.	Nation	Player
6	MF	USA	Alfredo Morales (from Hertha BSC)
15	DF	BRA	Danilo Soares (from SC Austria Lustenau)
28	FW	GER	Philipp Hofmann (on loan from FC Schalke 04)
30	MF	HUN	Tamás Hajnal (from VfB Stuttgart)
33	GK	GER	André Weis (from VfB Stuttgart)

Out:

No.	Pos.	Nation	Player
22	FW	BUL	Iliyan Mitsanski (loan return to 1. FC Kaiserslautern)
36	MF	ISR	Almog Cohen (from 1. FC Nürnberg, previously on loan at Hapoel Tel Aviv)
38	GK	GER	Sascha Kirschstein (to FC Erzgebirge Aue)

=== VfL Bochum ===
In:

No.	Pos.	Nation	Player
2	DF	GER	Jan Gyamerah (from VfL Bochum youth)
3	DF	GER	Fabian Holthaus (from VfL Bochum youth)
5	DF	GER	Heiko Butscher (from Eintracht Frankfurt)
8	MF	GER	Christian Tiffert (free agent)
9	FW	GER	Richard Sukuta-Pasu (on loan from 1. FC Kaiserslautern, previously on loan at Sturm Graz)
11	DF	GER	Felix Bastians (on loan from Hertha BSC)
12	MF	DEN	Ken Ilsø (from Fortuna Düsseldorf)
14	MF	BIH	Adnan Zahirović (from Spartak Nalchik, previously on loan at Dinamo Minsk)
18	MF	GER	Danny Latza (from SV Darmstadt 98)
17	FW	FRA	Smail Morabit (from FC Rot-Weiß Erfurt)
20	FW	POL	Piotr Ćwielong (from Śląsk Wrocław)
21	FW	GER	Joel Reinholz (from VfL Bochum youth)
23	DF	GER	Florian Jungwirth (from Dynamo Dresden)
29	FW	CRO	Mario Jelavić (from Slaven Belupo)

Out:

No.	Pos.	Nation	Player
9	FW	GEO	Nikoloz Gelashvili (to Qarabağ FK)
10	MF	GEO	Alexander Iashvili (released)
11	FW	SLO	Zlatko Dedič (to Dynamo Dresden)
12	MF	COL	Michael Javier Ortega (loan return to Bayer 04 Leverkusen)
13	MF	GER	Marc Rzatkowski (to FC St. Pauli)
14	MF	GER	Sören Bertram (on loan to Hallescher FC)
17	DF	GER	Florian Brügmann (to Hallescher FC)
18	MF	GER	Leon Goretzka (to FC Schalke 04)
21	FW	GER	Kevin Scheidhauer (loan return to VfL Wolfsburg)
23	MF	GER	Christoph Kramer (loan return to Bayer 04 Leverkusen)
29	GK	GER	Philipp Heerwagen (released)
30	DF	DEN	Michael Lumb (to FC Vestsjælland)
--	FW	GER	Daniel Engelbrecht (to Stuttgarter Kickers, previously on loan)

=== FC Erzgebirge Aue ===
In:

No.	Pos.	Nation	Player
11	FW	LTU	Arvydas Novikovas (from Heart of Midlothian)
12	FW	SVK	Jakub Sylvestr (from Dinamo Zagreb, previously on loan)
22	MF	GER	Rico Benatelli (from Borussia Dortmund II)
23	MF	FRA	Dorian Diring (from Hertha BSC II)
26	FW	NGR	Solomon Okoronkwo (from Pécsi MFC)
33	GK	GER	Sascha Kirschstein (from FC Ingolstadt 04)
34	DF	JPN	Taku Ishihara (from Mladost Podgorica)

Out:

No.	Pos.	Nation	Player
9	FW	NOR	Flamur Kastrati (to Strømsgodset IF)
11	FW	GER	Halil Savran (to Hansa Rostock)
17	MF	GER	Jan Hochscheidt (to Eintracht Braunschweig)
22	MF	GER	Marc Hensel (to Chemnitzer FC)
23	MF	GER	Nicolas Höfler (loan return to SC Freiburg)

=== Dynamo Dresden ===
In:

No.	Pos.	Nation	Player
6	MF	GER	Marco Hartmann (from Hallescher FC)
9	FW	GER	Soufian Benyamina (from VfB Stuttgart)
14	DF	GER	Alban Sabah (from FC Schalke 04 II)
15	FW	ALG	Mohamed Amine Aoudia (from ES Sétif)
17	DF	BIH	Adnan Mravac (from SV Mattersburg)
20	GK	GER	Nico Pellatz (from Sparta Rotterdam)
21	DF	CRO	Adam Sušac (from HNK Rijeka, previously on loan at Pomorac Kostrena)
22	FW	SLO	Zlatko Dedič (from VfL Bochum)
23	DF	GER	Thorsten Schulz (from VfR Aalen)
24	MF	GER	Christoph Menz (from 1. FC Union Berlin)

Out:

No.	Pos.	Nation	Player
6	DF	GER	Florian Jungwirth (to VfL Bochum)
20	DF	GER	Cüneyt Köz (to Kayserispor)
23	MF	GER	Denis Streker (loan return to 1899 Hoffenheim)
24	MF	GER	David Solga (to Borussia Dortmund II)
28	DF	GER	Marcel Franke (to Hallescher FC)
29	MF	GER	Tobias Jänicke (to SV Wehen Wiesbaden)
39	FW	FRA	Lynel Kitambala (loan return to AS Saint-Étienne)

=== SV Sandhausen ===
In:

No.	Pos.	Nation	Player
3	DF	SVK	Radoslav Zabavník (from 1. FSV Mainz 05)
6	MF	GER	Denis Linsmayer (from 1. FC Kaiserslautern)
7	MF	GER	Marco Thiede (from FC Augsburg)
14	DF	GER	Tim Kister (from VfR Aalen)
17	DF	GER	Florian Hübner (from Borussia Dortmund II)
18	MF	GER	Matthias Zimmermann (on loan from Borussia Mönchengladbach, previously on loan at SpVgg Greuther Fürth)
23	MF	GER	Marc Lais (from SC Freiburg)
26	FW	GER	Ranisav Jovanović (from MSV Duisburg)
29	FW	GHA	Kwame Nsor (on loan from 1. FC Kaiserslautern)
30	DF	GER	Lukas Kübler (from 1. FC Köln)
31	MF	AUT	Stefan Kulovits (from Rapid Wien)
33	GK	GER	Manuel Riemann (from VfL Osnabrück)
37	MF	GER	Marvin Knoll (from Hertha BSC)
--	MF	GER	Björn Kluft (on loan from Eintracht Braunschweig)

Out:

No.	Pos.	Nation	Player
14	MF	GER	Jan Fießer (to Arminia Bielefeld)
21	MF	GER	Marcel Kandziora (to FSV Frankfurt)
26	DF	GER	Kim Falkenberg (to 1. FC Saarbrücken)
28	GK	GER	Philipp Kühn (to Rot-Weiß Oberhausen)
34	MF	AUT	Daniel Beichler (loan return to Hertha BSC)

=== Karlsruher SC ===
In:

No.	Pos.	Nation	Player
8	MF	GER	Reinhold Yabo (from 1. FC Köln)
11	FW	GER	Dimitrij Nazarov (from Preußen Münster)
14	DF	GER	Manuel Gulde (from SC Paderborn 07)
16	FW	GER	Dennis Mast (from Hallescher FC)
18	MF	ESP	Manuel Torres (from FC Schalke 04)
19	FW	BUL	Iliyan Mitsanski (from 1. FC Kaiserslautern, previously on loan at FC Ingolstadt 04)
20	DF	GER	Michael Vitzthum (on loan from VfB Stuttgart)
24	GK	GER	René Vollath (from Wacker Burghausen)
32	FW	KOR	Park Jung-Bin (from VfL Wolfsburg, previously on loan at SpVgg Greuther Fürth)

Out:

No.	Pos.	Nation	Player
9	FW	GER	Simon Brandstetter (loan return to SC Freiburg)
11	FW	GER	Elia Soriano (to Stuttgarter Kickers)
16	DF	PHI	Dennis Cagara (released)
18	DF	GER	Kevin Akpoguma (to 1899 Hoffenheim)

=== Arminia Bielefeld ===
In:

No.	Pos.	Nation	Player
17	MF	GER	Oliver Petersch (from Eintracht Braunschweig)
18	FW	CGO	Francky Sembolo (from Jahn Regensburg)
20	MF	GER	Jan Fießer (from SV Sandhausen)
27	GK	GER	Jarno Peters (from FC Schalke 04 II)
40	DF	GER	Jerome Propheter (from Viktoria Köln)
--	DF	GER	Arne Feick (from TSV 1860 München)

Out:

No.	Pos.	Nation	Player
29	MF	GER	Konak Nuri (on loan to BV Cloppenburg)

== See also ==
- 2013–14 Bundesliga
- 2013–14 2. Bundesliga
