= 2013–14 Dynamo Dresden season =

Dynamo Dresden
2013–14 season
- Chairman: Andreas Ritter
- Manager: Peter Pacult (to August); Steffen Menze (Interim, August–September); Olaf Janßen (from September)
- Stadium: Glücksgas Stadium, Dresden, Saxony
- 2. Bundesliga: 17th (relegated)
- DFB-Pokal: Suspended
Home colours	Away colours

The 2013–14 Dynamo Dresden season was the 64th season in the club's football history. In 2013–14 the club played in the 2. Fußball-Bundesliga, the second tier of German football. It was the clubs second consecutive season in this league, having played at this level since 2011–12, after winning promotion from the 3. Liga in 2011.

The club were suspended from the 2013–14 edition of the DFB-Pokal, due to crowd trouble in the previous season's competition.

== Review and events ==
Dynamo began the season slowly, failing to win any of their first nine matches of the season. This run cost coach Peter Pacult his job, he was sacked in August and replaced by Olaf Janßen. Jansen was unable to save the club from relegation – they finished 17th, having been leapfrogged into this position by Arminia Bielefeld after a dramatic 3–2 home defeat on the last day of the season. Dynamo had won just five games all season, and drawn seventeen.

== Matches ==
=== Legend ===
Win Draw Loss Postponed

=== 2. Bundesliga ===
20 July 2013 1	Dynamo Dresden	1–1	1. FC Köln	Dresden
15:30	Kempe 78'	Report	Ujah 61'	Stadium: Glücksgas Stadion; Attendance: 29,300; Referee: Wolfgang Stark (Ergolding)

29 July 2013 2	VfL Bochum	1–1	Dynamo Dresden	Bochum
20:15	Fabian 10'	Report	Fiel 69'	Stadium: rewirpowerSTADION; Attendance: 20,200; Referee: Tobias Stieler (Obertshausen)

9 August 2013 3	Dynamo Dresden	1–3	1. FC Union Berlin	Dresden
18:30	Susac 73'	Report	Brandy 23'; Mattuschka 25'; Kreilach 37'	Stadium: Glücksgas Stadium; Attendance: 29,200; Referee: Peter Sippel (Munich)

18 August 2013 4	Dynamo Dresden	0–3	FSV Frankfurt	Dresden
13:30		Report	Kapllani 40', 50', 69'	Stadium: Glücksgas Stadium; Attendance: 24,100; Referee: Frank Willenborg (Osnabrück)

26 August 2013 5	FC St. Pauli	2–1	Dynamo Dresden	Hamburg
20:15	Kringe 73'; Maier 88'	Report	Aoudia 71'	Stadium: Millerntorstadion; Attendance: 28,600; Referee: Manuel Gräfe (Berlin)

1 September 2013 6	Dynamo Dresden	1–1	FC Ingolstadt 04	Dresden
13:30	Menz 24'	Report	Hofmann 11'	Stadium: Glücksgas Stadium; Attendance: 22,700; Referee: Harm Osmers (Hannover)

15 September 2013 7	Fortuna Düsseldorf	1–1	Dynamo Dresden	Düsseldorf
17:30	Fink 18'	Report	Müller 82'	Stadium: Esprit-Arena; Attendance: 35,900; Referee: Thorsten Kinhöfer (Herne)

22 September 2013 8	Dynamo Dresden	2–2	SC Paderborn 07	Dresden
13:30	Aoudia 63'; Dedić 67'	Report	Wurtz 47'; Saglik 84'	Stadium: Glücksgas Stadium; Attendance: 22,800; Referee: Tobias Christ (Münchweiler an der Rodalb)

30 September 2013 9	SpVgg Greuther Fürth	4–0	Dynamo Dresden	Fürth
20:15	Stieber 10'; Brégerie 63'; Gießelmann 76'; Sparv 86'			Stadium: Trolli-Arena; Attendance: 12,500; Referee: Tobias Welz (Wiesbaden)

5 October 2013 10	Dynamo Dresden	2–0	VfR Aalen	Dresden
13:00	Aoudia 28'; Hartmann 35'	Report		Stadium: Glücksgas Stadium; Attendance: 20,000; Referee: Christian Fischer (Hemer)

19 October 2013 11	SV Sandhausen	0–0	Dynamo Dresden	Sandhausen
13:00		Report (in German)		Stadium: Hartdwaldstadion; Attendance: 6,500; Referee: Christian Leicher (Weihmichl)

27 October 2013 12	Dynamo Dresden	1–0	Energie Cottbus	Dresden
13:30	Poté 72'	Report		Stadium: Glücksgas Stadium; Attendance: 29,600; Referee: Felix Brych (Munich)

3 November 2013 13	1860 Munich	1–3	Dynamo Dresden	Munich
13:30	Vallori 9'	Report	Poté 2'; Dedić 10'; Aoudia 90+3'	Stadium: Allianz Arena; Attendance: 23,500; Referee: Christian Dingert (Lebecksmühle)

10 November 2013 14	Dynamo Dresden	1–1	Erzgebirge Aue	Dresden
13:30	Schulz 71'	Report	Klingbeil 90+1'	Stadium: Glücksgas Stadium; Attendance: 30,084; Referee: Daniel Siebert

24 November 2013 15	Karlsruher SC	3–0	Dynamo Dresden	Karlsruhe
13:30	Hennings 8' van der Biezen 20'; Nazarov 72'	Report		Stadium: Wildparkstadion; Attendance: 16,520; Referee: Sascha Stegemann

30 November 2013 16	Dynamo Dresden	3–2	1. FC Kaiserslautern	Dresden
13:00	Kempe 41'; Ouali 78'; Dedić 80'	Report	Occéan 45'; Gaus 73'	Stadium: Glücksgas Stadium; Attendance: 28,368; Referee: Florian Meyer

6 December 2013 17	Arminia Bielefeld	1–1	Dynamo Dresden	Bielefeld
18:30	Lorenz 60'	Report	Aoudia 90+2'	Stadium: Schücho Arena; Attendance: 14,587; Referee: Tobias Stieler

13 December 2013 18	1. FC Köln	3–1	Dynamo Dresden	Cologne
18:30	Helmes 14', 25'; Brecko 52'	Report	Aoudia 56'	Stadium: Müngersdorfer Stadion; Attendance: 14,587; Referee: Peter Gagelmann

20 December 2013 19	Dynamo Dresden	0–0	VfL Bochum	Dresden
18:30		Report		Stadium: Glücksgas Stadium; Attendance: 27,900; Referee: Christian Dingert

8 February 2014 20	1. FC Union Berlin	0–0	Dynamo Dresden	Berlin
18:30		Report		Stadium: Alte Försterei; Attendance: 21,700; Referee: Wolfgang Stark

15 February 2014 21	FSV Frankfurt	3–2	Dynamo Dresden	Frankfurt
13:00	Kapllani 54'; Epstein 83'; Huber 86'	Report	Grifo 11'; Schuppan 89'	Stadium: Stadion am Bornheimer Hang; Attendance: 6,000; Referee: Patrick Ittrich

23 February 2014 22	Dynamo Dresden	1–2	FC St. Pauli	Dresden
13:00	Hartmann 44'	Report	Kringe 35'; Halstenberg 88'	Stadium: Glücksgas Stadium; Attendance: 29,600; Referee: Tobias Welz

2 March 2014 23	FC Ingolstadt 04	1–1	Dynamo Dresden	Ingolstadt
13:00	Caiuby 1'	Report	Koch 43'	Stadium: Audi Sportpark; Attendance: 8,500; Referee: Michael Weiner

23 February 2014 24	Dynamo Dresden	1–1	Fortuna Düsseldorf	Dresden
13:30	Ouali 55'	Report	Latka 90'	Stadium: Glücksgas Stadium; Attendance: 27,500; Referee: Jochen Drees

14 March 2014 25	SC Paderborn 07	2–1	Dynamo Dresden	Paderborn
13:00	Bakalorz 38'; Wurtz 44'	Report	Dedic 55'	Stadium: Benteler Arena; Attendance: 10,800; Referee: Sascha Stegemann

21 March 2014 26	Dynamo Dresden	1–1	SpVgg Greuther Fürth	Dresden
18:30	Dedic 71' (pen.)	Report	Djurdjic 79' (pen.)	Stadium: Glücksgas Stadium; Attendance: 25,100; Referee: Guido Winkmann

27 March 2014 27	VfR Aalen	1–1	Dynamo Dresden	Aalen
17:30	Leandro 84' (pen.)	Report	Kempe 79'	Stadium: Scholz-Arena; Attendance: 6,700; Referee: Markus Wingenbach

28 March 2014 28	Dynamo Dresden	0–0	SV Sandhausen	Dresden
18:30		Report		Stadium: Glücksgas Stadium; Attendance: 25,200; Referee: Benjamin Cortus

4 April 2014 29	Energie Cottbus	0–0	Dynamo Dresden	Cottbus
18:30		Report		Stadium: Stadion der Freundschaft; Attendance: 18,500; Referee: Günter Perl

14 April 2014 30	Dynamo Dresden	4–2	1860 Munich	Dresden
20:15	Kempe 5'; Ouali 11'; Koch 20', 44'	Report	Losilla 26' (o.g.); Adlung 89'	Stadium: Glücksgas Stadium; Attendance: 27,300; Referee: Daniel Siebert

17 April 2014 31	Erzgebirge Aue	2–0	Dynamo Dresden	Aue
18:30	Fink 6'; Löning 29'	Report		Stadium: Erzgebirgsstadion; Attendance: 15,000; Referee: Christian Dingert

27 April 2014 32	Dynamo Dresden	2–2	Karlsruher SC	Dresden
20:15	Brégerie 41'; Dedic 75'	Report	Hennings 6' (pen.); Mauersberger 55'	Stadium: Glücksgas Stadium; Attendance: 29,000; Referee: Martin Petersen

4 May 2014 33	1. FC Kaiserslautern	4–0	Dynamo Dresden	Kaiserslautern
15:30	Leistner 6' (o.g.); Idrissou 64' (pen.), 84'; Stöger 90'	Report		Stadium: Fritz-Walter-Stadion; Attendance: 30,400; Referee: Wolfgang Stark

11 May 2014 34	Dynamo Dresden	2–3	Arminia Bielefeld	Dresden
15:30	Poté 64'; Koch 70'	Report	Klos 41', 63'; Przybyłko 71'	Stadium: Glücksgas Stadium; Attendance: 29,600; Referee: Manuel Gräfe

== Squad ==
Note: Flags indicate national team as defined under FIFA eligibility rules; some limited exceptions apply. Players may hold more than one non-FIFA nationality.

No.	Pos.	Nation	Player
1	GK	GER	Markus Scholz
4	DF	SEN	Cheikh Gueye
5	DF	FRA	Romain Brégerie (captain)
6	MF	GER	Marco Hartmann
7	MF	ALG	Idir Ouali
8	MF	CZE	Filip Trojan
9	FW	ALG	Soufian Benyamina (to January)
10	FW	BEN	Mickaël Poté
11	MF	FRA	Anthony Losilla
13	GK	GER	Benjamin Kirsten
14	DF	GER	Alban Sabah
15	FW	ALG	Mohamed Amine Aoudia
17	DF	BIH	Adnan Mravac
18	MF	GER	Tobias Kempe
19	MF	ITA	Vincenzo Grifo (from January)

No.	Pos.	Nation	Player
20	GK	GER	Nico Pellatz (to January)
21	DF	CRO	Adam Sušac
22	FW	SVN	Zlatko Dedič (vice-captain)
23	DF	GER	Thorsten Schulz
24	MF	GER	Christoph Menz
25	MF	GER	Robert Koch
27	DF	GER	Sebastian Schuppan
31	MF	GER	Paul Milde
34	MF	GER	Marvin Stefaniak
35	GK	GER	Florian Fromlowitz
36	MF	GER	Tommy Klotke
37	DF	GER	Toni Leistner
38	FW	GER	Tobias Müller
40	MF	ESP	Cristian Fiél

== Transfers ==
=== Summer ===
In:

No.	Pos.	Nation	Player
6	MF	GER	Marco Hartmann (from Hallescher FC)
9	FW	GER	Soufian Benyamina (from VfB Stuttgart)
14	DF	GER	Alban Sabah (from FC Schalke 04 II)
15	FW	ALG	Mohamed Amine Aoudia (from ES Sétif)
17	DF	BIH	Adnan Mravac (from SV Mattersburg)
20	GK	GER	Nico Pellatz (from Sparta Rotterdam)
21	DF	CRO	Adam Sušac (from HNK Rijeka, previously on loan at Pomorac Kostrena)
22	FW	SVN	Zlatko Dedič (from VfL Bochum)
23	DF	GER	Thorsten Schulz (from VfR Aalen)
24	MF	GER	Christoph Menz (from 1. FC Union Berlin)
31	MF	GER	Paul Milde (from Youth team)
34	MF	GER	Marvin Stefaniak (from Youth team)
36	MF	GER	Tommy Klotke (from Dynamo Dresden II)
37	DF	GER	Toni Leistner (loan return from Hallescher FC)

Out:

No.	Pos.	Nation	Player
6	DF	GER	Florian Jungwirth (to VfL Bochum)
9	FW	CZE	Pavel Fort (to Slovan Bratislava)
17	MF	GER	Lars Jungnickel (to Dynamo Dresden II)
19	MF	GRE	Yiannis Papadopoulos (to Aris)
20	DF	GER	Cüneyt Köz (to Kayserispor, previously on loan at Preußen Münster)
22	DF	GER	Muhamed Subasic (loan return to Olimpik Sarajevo)
22	DF	GER	Bjarne Thoelke (loan return to VfL Wolfsburg)
23	MF	GER	Denis Streker (loan return to 1899 Hoffenheim)
24	MF	GER	David Solga (to Borussia Dortmund II)
28	DF	GER	Marcel Franke (to Hallescher FC)
29	MF	GER	Tobias Jänicke (to SV Wehen Wiesbaden)
30	FW	BLR	Dmitri Khlebosolov (loan return to Spartak Moscow)
39	FW	FRA	Lynel Kitambala (loan return to AS Saint-Étienne)

=== Winter ===
In:

No.	Pos.	Nation	Player
19	MF	ITA	Vincenzo Grifo (on loan from 1899 Hoffenheim)

Out:

No.	Pos.	Nation	Player
9	FW	ALG	Soufian Benyamina (on loan to Preußen Münster)
20	GK	GER	Nico Pellatz (to Viktoria Köln)
