= Alban (given name) =

- Gender: Male

Origin
- Region of origin: Europe

Alban is an Albanian, English, German and French masculine given name. The Albanian female version is Albana.

== Notable people ==
Saints

- Saint Alban, the first British martyr, for whom the city of St Albans in England is named
- Saint Alban of Mainz, German martyr
- Saint Alban Roe (1583–1642), English martyr and Benedictine priest

Others

- Alban Ajdini (born 1999), Swiss footballer
- Alban Arnold (1892–1916), English cricketer
- Alban Bagbin (born 1957), Speaker of the Parliament of Ghana
- Alban Bensa (1948–2021), French anthropologist
- Alban Beqiri (born 1994), Albanian boxer
- Alban Berg (1885–1935), Austrian composer
- Alban Birch (1526–1599), English politician
- Alban Bizhyti (born 1984), Albanian footballer
- Alban Bunjaku (born 1994), Kosovar-Albanian footballer
- Alban Bushi (born 1973), Albanian football coach
- Alban Butler (1710–1773), English priest and hagiographer
- Alban Jasper Conant (1821–1915), American painter
- Alban Caroe (1904–1991), British architect
- Alban Çejku (born 2001), Albanian footballer
- Alban Ceray (born 1945), Monegasque adult film actor
- Alban Curteis (1887–1961), English Royal Navy officer
- Alban Davies, Welsh rugby union footballer
- Alban Dobson (1885–1962), English cricketer
- Alban Dorrinton (1800–1872), English cricketer
- Alban Dragusha (born 1981), Kosovar footballer
- Alban Dudushi (born 1972), Albanian journalist
- Alban Ellison (1889–1974), English-Canadian lawyer and politician
- Alban Farmer (1901–1988), Canadian politician
- Alban Faust (born 1960), Swedish luthier
- Alban Ferati (born 1991), Finnish-Kosovan footballer
- Alban Francis (died 1715), English Roman Catholic Benedictine monk
- Alban Garon (1930–2007), Canadian judge
- Alban Gerhardt (born 1969), German cellist
- Alban Gibbs (1846–1936), British politician
- Alban Gordon (1890–1947), British political activist
- Alban Harrison (1869–1943), English footballer
- Alban Hill (died 1559), Welsh physicist
- Alban Hoxha (born 1987), Albanian footballer
- Alban Joinel (born 1979), French football goalkeeper
- Alban Jusufi (born 1981), Swedish-Albanian footballer
- Alban Köhler (1874–1947), German radiologist
- Alban Lafont (born 1999), French football goalkeeper
- Alban Lakata (born 1979), Austrian cyclist
- Alban Landry (1934–2013), Canadian politician
- Alban Langdale (fl. 1532–1580), English Roman Catholic churchman and author
- Alban Lendorf (born 1989), Danish ballet dancer and actor
- Alban Lenoir (born 1980), French actor, screenwriter and stuntman
- Alban Lynch (1930–2021), Australian mining engineer and academic
- Alban MacLellan (1902–1968), Canadian politician
- Alban Maginness (born 1950), Northern Irish politician and Lord Mayor of Belfast (1997–1998)
- Alban McCoy (born 1951), British Catholic writer and priest
- Alban Meha (born 1986), Kosovar-Albanian footballer
- Alban Muja (born 1980), Kosovan contemporary artist and filmmaker
- Alban J. Parker (1893–1971), American attorney and politician
- Alban Pierson (born 1972), French sport shooter
- Alban Pnishi (born 1990), Kosovar-Albanian footballer
- Alban Préaubert (born 1985), French figure skater
- Alban W. Purcell (c. 1843–1913), American actor, dramatist, and manager
- Alban Ramaj (born 1985), Kosovar-Albanian footballer
- Alban Ramosaj (born 1996), Albanian singer, songwriter, producer, director, actor, and model
- Alban Riley (1844–1914), Australian politician
- Alban Roe (1583–1642), English Benedictine priest
- Alban Rooman, Belgian sports shooter
- Alban Russell (1905–1980), Belizean clergy
- Alban Sabah (born 1992), Togolese footballer
- Alban Shabani (born 2000), Kosovan footballer
- Alban Skënderaj (born 1982), Albanian singer, songwriter, composer, actor, producer, and television personality
- Alban Stepney (died 1611), English politician
- Alban C. Stimers (1827–1876), American U.S. Navy Chief Engineer
- Alban Stolz (1808–1883), German theologian and author
- Alban Sulejmani (born 1998), Macedonian footballer
- Alban Tafaj (born 1971), Albanian footballer and manager
- Alban Thomas (1686–1771), Welsh doctor, librarian and antiquarian
- Alban Turner (1885–1951), English cricketer
- Alban Ukaj (born 1980), Kosovar-Albanian actor
- Dr. Alban (born 1957), Nigerian-Swedish musician and producer
