= Albane (given name) =

Albane is a French feminine given name.

== List of people with the given name ==
- Albane Dubois (born 1992), French sailor
- Albane Gaillot (born 1971), French politician
- Albane Valenzuela (born 1997), American-French-Swiss Olympian golfer

== See also ==
- Alban (given name)
- Arbane, type of grape
- Albanese (surname)
- Albanel, Quebec
- Albania
