= Soufian Benyamina =

German footballer

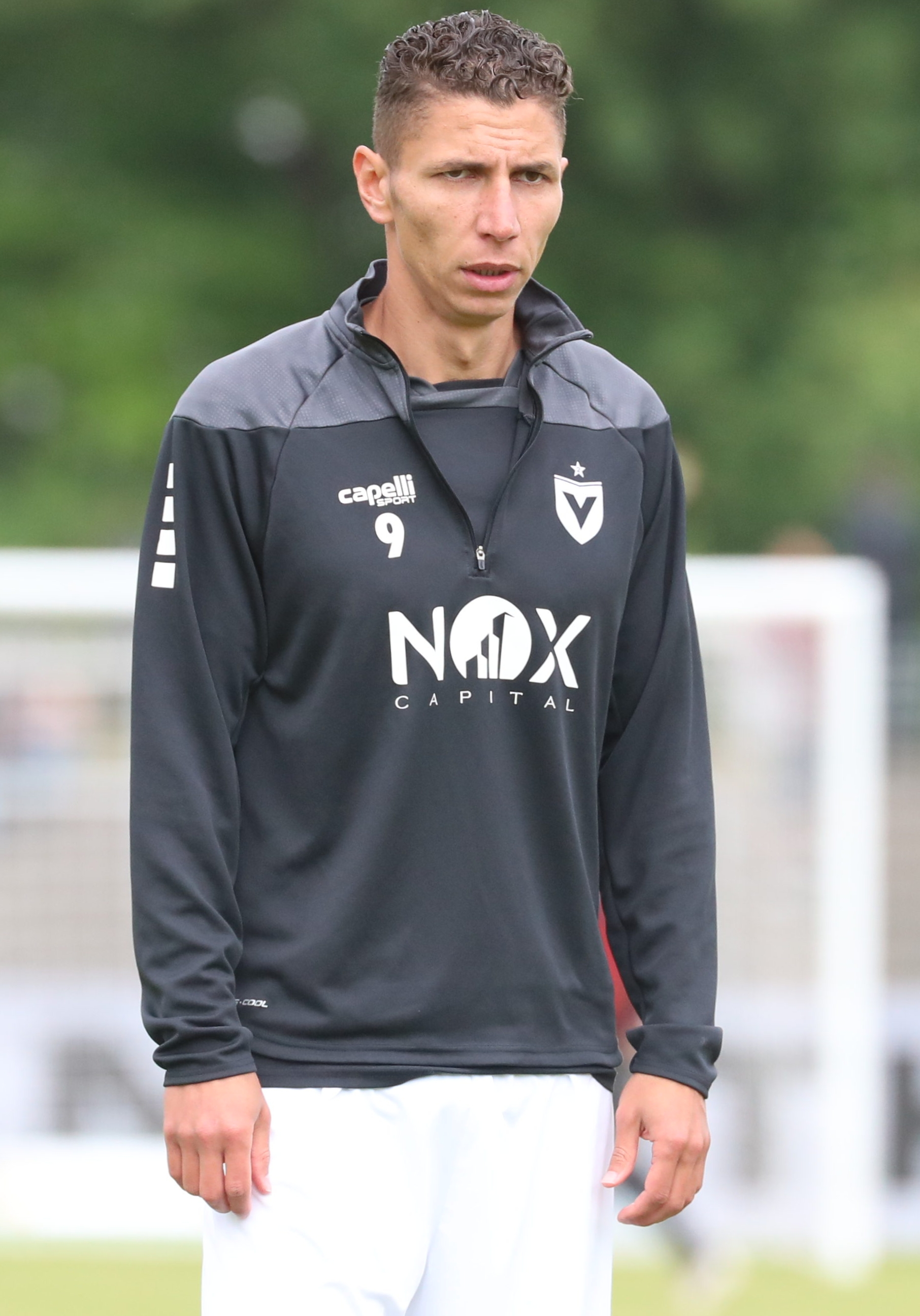
- Benyamina with Viktoria Berlin (2022)

Personal information
- Date of birth: 2 March 1990 (age 36)
- Place of birth: East Berlin, East Germany
- Height: 1.89 m (6 ft 2 in)
- Position: Forward

Team information
- Current team: Hallescher FC
- Number: 90

Youth career
- MSV Normannia 08 Berlin
- –2007: Hertha BSC
- 2007–2009: Union Berlin

Senior career*
Years	Team	Apps	(Gls)
2009–2010	Carl Zeiss Jena	18	(3)
2010–2013	VfB Stuttgart II	98	(28)
2012–2013	VfB Stuttgart	2	(0)
2013–2014	Dynamo Dresden	4	(0)
2014	→ Preußen Münster (loan)	17	(6)
2014–2015	Wehen Wiesbaden	35	(7)
2015–2018	Hansa Rostock	70	(18)
2018–2020	Pogoń Szczecin	25	(2)
2019	Pogoń Szczecin II	3	(2)
2020–2021	VfB Lübeck	24	(3)
2021–2022	Viktoria Berlin	23	(5)
2022–2026	Greifswalder FC	109	(60)
2026–	Hallescher FC	6	(1)
- * Club domestic league appearances and goals as of 23 September 2026

Soufian Benyamina (born 2 March 1990) is a German professional footballer who plays as a forward for Hallescher FC.

== Personal life ==
His older brother Karim is also professional footballer and is currently playing for Berliner AK 07 and the Algerian national team.

== Career ==
Benyamina began his career in the youth side with MSV Normannia 08 Berlin. He was later scouted by Hertha BSC. After few years with Hertha BSC, he joined rival Union Berlin, where he played twenty three games and scored four goals in the A Jugend Bundesliga Nord/Nordost in the 2008–09 season. He left Union Berlin in July 2009 and signed for Carl Zeiss Jena. Here played his first professional match in the 3. Liga on 29 July 2009 against SV Sandhausen and scored on 25 October 2009 his first goal against SpVgg Unterhaching. On 14 June 2010, he left Carl Zeiss Jena and signed for VfB Stuttgart II. He signed in Stuttgart a three years contract and played first for the 3. Liga team.

On 8 December 2012, Benyamina made his Bundesliga debut for the first team of VfB Stuttgart in a 3–1 home victory against Schalke 04.

On 1 July 2013, he moved to Dynamo Dresden. After an unsuccessful half-season, in which Benyamina made only four appearances for Dynamo, the club loaned him to 3rd division club Preußen Münster in the winter transfer window. At the end of the season he left Dynamo permanently, signing for SV Wehen Wiesbaden.

In August 2015, Benyamina signed for 3. Liga club Hansa Rostock on a three-year deal.

== Career statistics ==
As of match played 1 July 2022

Appearances and goals by club, season and competition
Club	Season	League			DFB-Pokal		Other		Total	
Club	Season	Division	Apps	Goals	Apps	Goals	Apps	Goals	Apps	Goals
Carl Zeiss Jena	2009–10	3. Liga	18	3	—		—		18	3
VfB Stuttgart II	2010–11	3. Liga	35	7	—		—		35	7
VfB Stuttgart II	2011–12	3. Liga	33	9	—		—		33	9
VfB Stuttgart II	2012–13	3. Liga	30	12	—		—		30	12
VfB Stuttgart II	Total		98	28	—		0	0	98	28
VfB Stuttgart	2012–13	Bundesliga	2	0	0	0	0	0	2	0
Dynamo Dresden	2013–14	2. Bundesliga	4	0	0	0	—		4	0
Preußen Münster	2013–14	3. Liga	17	6	0	0	—		17	6
Wehen Wiesbaden	2014–15	3. Liga	32	7	1	0	—		33	7
Wehen Wiesbaden	2015–16	3. Liga	3	0	—		—		3	0
Wehen Wiesbaden	Total		35	7	1	0	0	0	36	7
Hansa Rostock	2015–16	3. Liga	15	3	0	0	—		15	3
Hansa Rostock	2016–17	3. Liga	20	4	0	0	—		20	4
Hansa Rostock	2017–18	3. Liga	25	11	1	0	—		26	11
Hansa Rostock	Total		60	18	1	0	0	0	61	18
Pogoń Szczecin	2018–19	Ekstraklasa	15	2	–		–		15	2
Pogoń Szczecin	2019–20	Ekstraklasa	10	0	1	0	–		11	0
Pogoń Szczecin	Total		25	2	1	0	0	0	26	2
VfB Lübeck	2020–21	3. Liga	24	3	0	0	0	0	24	3
Viktoria Berlin	2021–22	3. Liga	23	5	0	0	0	0	23	5
Career total			306	72	3	0	0	0	309	72
