= Alban Davies =

Wales international rugby league & union footballer

Personal information
- Full name: Alban Davies
- Born: 14 January 1914 Machen, Wales
- Died: unknown

Playing information

Rugby union
- Position: Fullback
Club
Years	Team	Pld	T	G	FG	P
≤1938–≤38	Cross Keys RFC
≤1939–39	Cardiff RFC
	Total	0	0	0	0	0

Rugby league
- Position: Fullback
Club
Years	Team	Pld	T	G	FG	P
≤1943–≥46	Huddersfield
Representative
Years	Team	Pld	T	G	FG	P
1943–46	Wales	2	0	3	0	6

Alban Davies was a Welsh rugby union and professional rugby league footballer who played in the 1930s and 1940s. He played club level rugby union (RU) for Cross Keys RFC and Cardiff RFC, as a fullback, and representative level rugby league (RL) for Wales, and at club level for Huddersfield, as a fullback.

== Playing career ==
Davies played rugby union for Cross Keys RFC and Cardiff RFC before moving to England to play rugby league for Huddersfield.

Davies won 2 caps for Wales (RL) in 1943–1946 while at Huddersfield.
