= Alban Russell =

Dean of Belize from 1953 to 1957

Alban Edward Russell (1905–1980) was the Dean of Belize from 1953 to 1957.

Russell was born in 1905, educated at Chichester Theological College and ordained deacon in 1929 and priest in 1930. After a curacies in East Preston and Eastbourne he was assistant priest vicar at Chichester Cathedral. After this he was Vicar of Amport before his time as dean and, afterwards, chaplain general to the Community of the Holy Name. He is buried at St Peter's Cassington.
