= Kwame Nsor =

Ghanaian footballer

Personal information
- Date of birth: 1 August 1992 (age 34)
- Place of birth: Accra, Ghana
- Height: 1.88 m (6 ft 2 in)
- Position: Forward

Youth career
- –2010: Tudu Mighty Jets
- 2009–2010: → All Stars (loan)

Senior career*
Years	Team	Apps	(Gls)
2010–2012	Metz	6	(2)
2012–2013	1. FC Kaiserslautern	8	(0)
2013–2017	Metz	17	(3)
2015–2016	→ RFC Seraing (loan)	22	(4)
2016–2017	→ União da Madeira (loan)	30	(15)
2017–2019	Académico Viseu	47	(23)
2019	Feirense	13	(4)
2020	Cova Piedade	6	(0)

International career
- Ghana U-20
- * Club domestic league appearances and goals as of 18:08, 11 May 2020 (UTC)

Kwame Nsor (born 1 August 1992) is a Ghanaian professional footballer who plays as a forward.

== Career ==
Nsor joined German side 1. FC Kaiserslautern from FC Metz in July 2012 and made his debut for the club two months later, as a substitute for Enis Alushi in a 2. Bundesliga match against MSV Duisburg.

On 16 June 2013, SV Sandhausen announced that they had agreed upon a season-long loan deal with Kaiserslautern but then they stated on 7 July 2013 that the agreement did not become valid due to missing medical certificates. Kaiserslautern objected to that view.

On 2 September 2013, Nsor returned to FC Metz on a four-year deal.
