= Alban Bensa =

French anthropologist (1948–2021)

- Born: 18 September 1948; Paris, France
- Died: 10 October 2021 (aged 73); Paris, France
- Occupation: Anthropologist

Alban Bensa (18 September 1948 – 10 October 2021) was a French anthropologist. He was director of studies at the School for Advanced Studies in the Social Sciences and specialized in the study of New Caledonia and Kanak people.

== Publications ==
=== Books ===
- Les Chemins de l'alliance : l'organisation sociale et ses représentations en Nouvelle-Calédonie, région de Touho, aire linguistique cèmuhî (1982)
- Chroniques Kanak : l'ethnologie en marche (1995)
- Nouvelle-Calédonie, vers l’émancipation (1998)
- Ethnologie et architecture : le Centre culturel Tjibaou, Nouméa, Nouvelle-Calédonie (2000)
- La fin de l'exotisme : essais d'anthropologie critique (2006)
- Après Lévi-Strauss : pour une anthropologie à taille humaine (2010)
- Les sanglots de l'aigle pêcheur. Nouvelle-Calédonie : la Guerre kanak de 1917 (2015)

=== Collections ===
- Les filles du rocher Até : contes et récits paicî (1995)
- 1878 : carnets de campagne en Nouvelle-Calédonie (2004)
- Histoire d'une chefferie kanak, 1740-1878 (2005)
- Les politiques de l'enquête (2008)
