= Thorsten Schulz =

German footballer (born 1984)

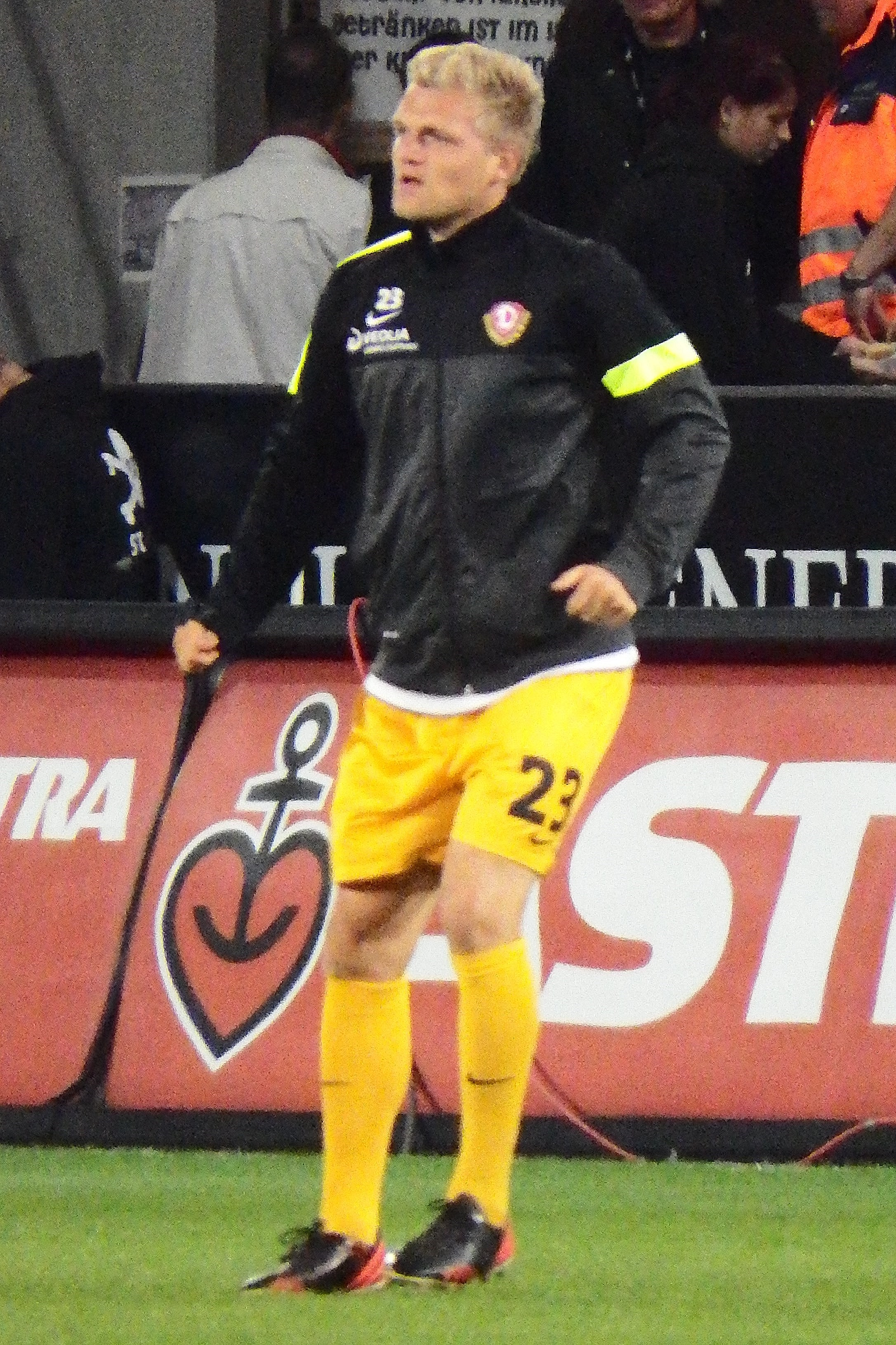
- Schulz with Dynamo Dresden in 2013.

Personal information
- Date of birth: 5 December 1984 (age 41)
- Place of birth: Groß-Gerau, West Germany
- Height: 1.80 m (5 ft 11 in)
- Position: Right-back

Youth career
- SV Untermenzing
- Bayern Munich
- –2002: Energie Cottbus

Senior career*
Years	Team	Apps	(Gls)
2002–2005	Energie Cottbus II		
2005–2006	SC Fürstenfeldbruck		
2006–2007	SpVgg Unterhaching II	42	(2)
2007–2011	SpVgg Unterhaching	97	(2)
2011–2013	VfR Aalen	34	(1)
2013–2014	Dynamo Dresden	24	(1)
2014–2015	Erzgebirge Aue	3	(0)
2015	Preußen Münster	14	(0)
2015–2018	VfR Aalen	69	(1)
- * Club domestic league appearances and goals as of 19:48, 27 February 2019 (UTC)

Thorsten Schulz (born 5 December 1984) is a German footballer who plays as a right-back.

== Career statistics ==
As of 27 February 2019

Appearances and goals by club, season and competition
Club	Season	League			Cup		Other		Total	
Club	Season	Division	Apps	Goals	Apps	Goals	Apps	Goals	Apps	Goals
SpVgg Unterhaching	2008–09	3. Liga	33	2	0	0	0	0	33	2
SpVgg Unterhaching	2009–10	3. Liga	20	0	1	0	0	0	21	0
SpVgg Unterhaching	2010–11	3. Liga	22	0	0	0	0	0	22	0
SpVgg Unterhaching	Total		75	2	1	0	0	0	76	2
VfR Aalen	2011–12	3. Liga	23	1	0	0	0	0	23	1
VfR Aalen	2012–13	2. Bundesliga	11	0	0	0	0	0	11	0
VfR Aalen	Total		34	1	0	0	0	0	34	1
Dynamo Dresden	2013–14	2. Bundesliga	24	1	0	0	0	0	24	1
Erzgebirge Aue	2014–15	2. Bundesliga	3	0	2	0	0	0	5	0
Preußen Münster	2014–15	3. Liga	14	0	0	0	0	0	14	0
VfR Aalen	2015–16	3. Liga	29	0	1	0	0	0	30	0
VfR Aalen	2016–17	3. Liga	20	1	0	0	0	0	20	1
VfR Aalen	2017–18	3. Liga	20	0	0	0	0	0	20	0
VfR Aalen	Total		69	1	0	0	0	0	69	1
Career totals			219	5	4	0	0	0	223	5
