= Nico Pellatz =

German footballer (born 1986)

Personal information
- Full name: Nico-Stéphàno Pellatz
- Date of birth: 8 July 1986 (age 40)
- Place of birth: West Berlin, West Germany
- Height: 1.91 m (6 ft 3 in)
- Position: Goalkeeper

Youth career
- –1998: Blau Weiss Berlin
- 1998–2002: Tasmania-Gropiusstadt
- 2002–2004: Hertha BSC

Senior career*
Years	Team	Apps	(Gls)
2004–2006	Hertha BSC II	35	(0)
2007–2009	Werder Bremen II	36	(0)
2007–2009	Werder Bremen	0	(0)
2009–2010	Apollon Limassol	3	(0)
2010–2011	ADO Den Haag	0	(0)
2010–2011	→ Excelsior (loan)	9	(0)
2011–2013	Sparta Rotterdam	66	(0)
2013–2014	Dynamo Dresden	0	(0)
2014–2017	Viktoria Köln	77	(0)
2017–2019	VfL Wolfsburg II	4	(0)
Total		230	(0)

Managerial career
- 2019–2020: Berliner SC (goalkeeping coach)
- 2020–2021: DAC Dunajská Streda (goalkeeping coach)
- * Club domestic league appearances and goals

Nico-Stéphàno Pellatz (born 8 July 1986) is a German former professional footballer who played as a goalkeeper.

== Career ==
Pellatz was part of Hertha BSC's reserve team since 2004 and signed a professional contract with the club for the 2006-07 season, during which he did not make any appearances in the Bundesliga as the third-choice goalkeeper behind Christian Fiedler and Kevin Stuhr-Ellegaard. Between 2005 and 2007, he made 36 appearances for Hertha's reserve team in the third-division Regionalliga Nord.

In the summer of 2007, he moved to Werder Bremen on a two-year deal for both Bundesliga and Regionalliga squads. He was the third-choice goalkeeper in Werder Bremen's professional squad, behind Tim Wiese and Christian Vander, and did not make any Bundesliga appearances. However, he was a regular at the club's reserve squad, where he also made three appearances in the German Cup.

After being released by Werder Bremen on 10 June 2009, he moved to Cypriot club Apollon Limassol on a two-year deal.

On 13 September 2010, it was announced that Pellatz would join the Dutch club ADO Den Haag. During the January 2011 transfer window, Pellatz moved to Excelsior Rotterdam on loan. The following season, he left Den Haag permanently, moving to Sparta Rotterdam.

On 4 July 2013, it was announced that Pellatz would leave Sparta to sign a two-year-contract with Dynamo Dresden. Six months later he signed for Viktoria Köln after only have been capped for Dresden's reserve team. He left the club on a free transfer since his contract was dissolved by mutual agreement.

After two seasons with VfL Wolfsburg II, Pellatz left at the end of the 2018–19 season where his contract expired.
