= Christoph Menz =

German professional footballer (born 1988)

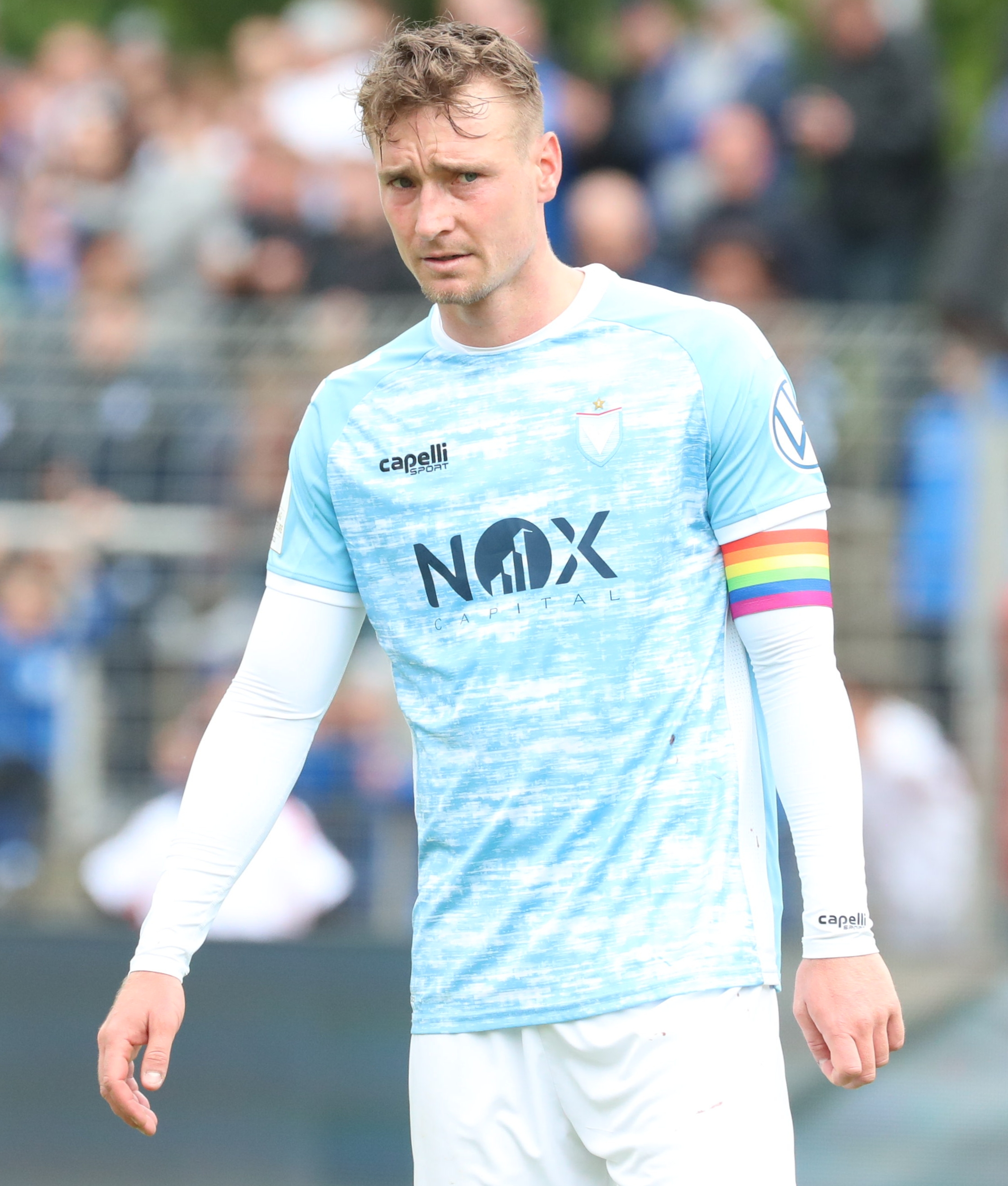
- Menz in 2022

Personal information
- Date of birth: 22 December 1988 (age 37)
- Place of birth: Magdeburg, East Germany
- Height: 1.85 m (6 ft 1 in)
- Position: Centre back

Team information
- Current team: BFC Preussen
- Number: 30

Youth career
- 1994–1996: SG Messtron Magdeburg
- 1996–2000: 1. FC Magdeburg
- 2000–2007: Union Berlin

Senior career*
Years	Team	Apps	(Gls)
2007–2013	Union Berlin	123	(0)
2013–2014	Dynamo Dresden	21	(1)
2014–2018	Rot-Weiß Erfurt	114	(7)
2018	Fortuna Köln	15	(1)
2018–2019	Viktoria Berlin	14	(0)
2019	Eintracht Braunschweig	10	(0)
2019–2022	Viktoria Berlin	61	(4)
2022–	BFC Preussen	7	(0)
- * Club domestic league appearances and goals as of 6 November 2022

Christoph Menz (born 22 December 1988) is a German professional footballer who plays as a defender for BFC Preussen.

== Career ==
In August 2018, Menz agreed the termination of his contract with Fortuna Köln.
