= Adam Sušac =

Croatian footballer

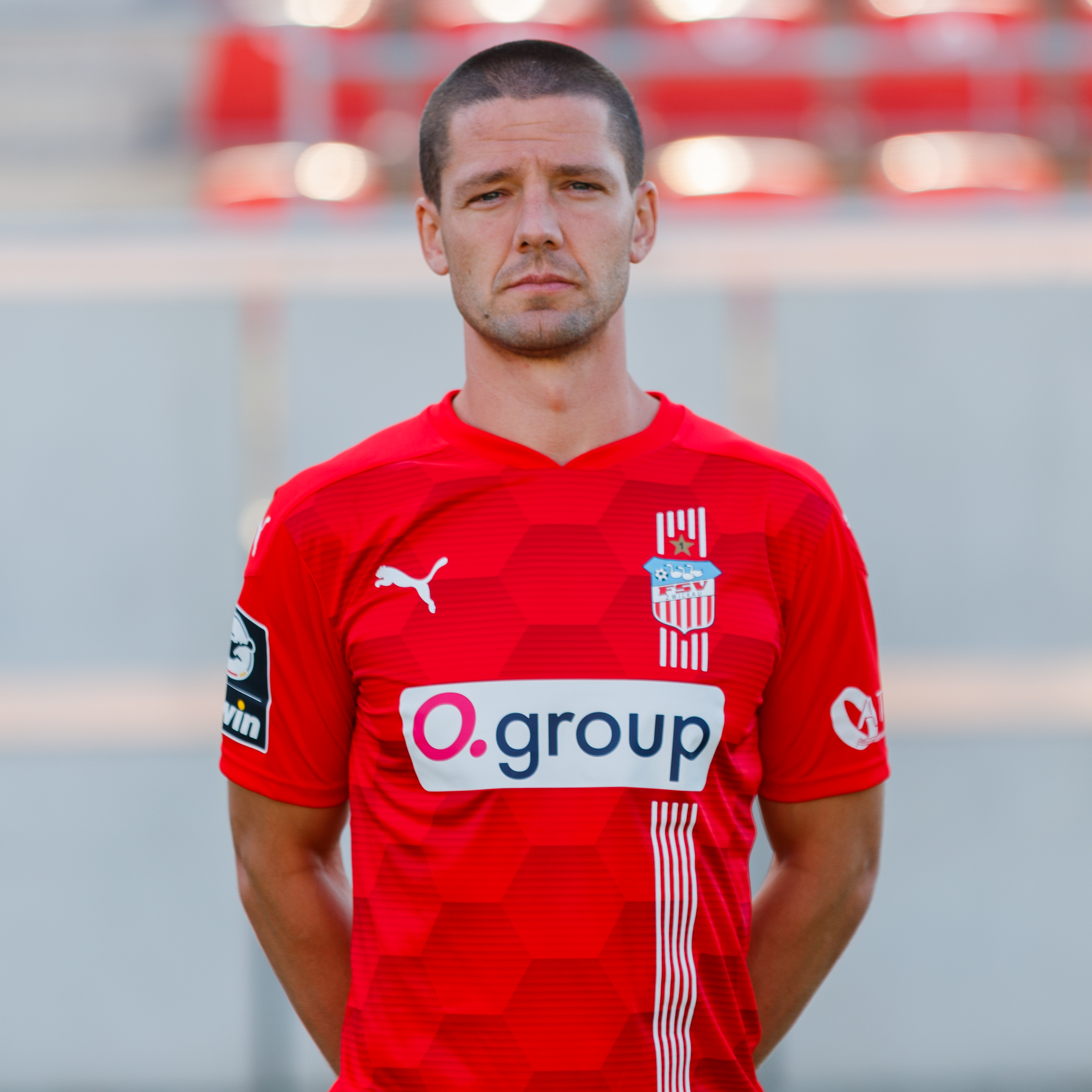
- Sušac with FSV Zwickau in 2021

Personal information
- Date of birth: 20 May 1989 (age 37)
- Place of birth: Novi Marof, SFR Yugoslavia
- Height: 1.84 m (6 ft 0 in)
- Position: Defender

Senior career*
Years	Team	Apps	(Gls)
2009–2011	Varteks Varaždin	36	(1)
2008–2009	→ Sloboda (loan)		
2012–2013	Rijeka	2	(0)
2013	→ Pomorac (loan)	15	(4)
2013–2014	Dynamo Dresden	17	(1)
2014–2015	Wiener Neustadt	19	(1)
2015–2017	Erzgebirge Aue	45	(0)
2017–2021	VfL Osnabrück	80	(1)
2021–2023	FSV Zwickau	14	(0)

International career
2005	Croatia U16	3	(2)
2005	Croatia U17	11	(0)
2007–2008	Croatia U19	10	(0)

Managerial career
- 2024–2025: Erzgebirge Aue (interim)
- 2026: Hansa Rostock (interim)
- * Club domestic league appearances and goals

Adam Sušac (born 20 May 1989) is a Croatian professional footballer who plays as a centre-back.

== Club career ==
Born in Novi Marof, Sušac kicked off his career with Varteks in 2009 and went on to make 36 appearances for the club, which changed its name to NK Varaždin in mid 2010. He also enjoyed a loan spell at non league club Sloboda. In October 2011, he was released by the club. On 29 January 2012, he joined Rijeka on a two-year deal. In order to gain first team appearances, he joined second-tier club Pomorac on loan. In July 2013, he trialled with German club Dynamo Dresden, and featured for it in a friendly against Dutch side Ajax. After a successful trial, he signed permanently with the club, penning a one-year deal.

After a short stint with Austrian club Wiener Neustadt, Sušac returned to Germany, this time by joining Erzgebirge Aue of the 3. Liga in 2015. On 1 June 2017, after having played two seasons with the club, he was released. On 8 October 2017, he signed for VfL Osnabrück of the same league.

== International career ==
Sušac had been capped at the youth international level, featuring for Croatia under-16, Croatia under-17 and Croatia under-19.

== Career statistics ==
As of match played on 1 August 2020

Appearances and goals by club, season and competition
Club	Season	League			Cup		Continental		Total	
Club	Season	Division	Apps	Goals	Apps	Goals	Apps	Goals	Apps	Goals
Varteks (renamed Varaždin in mid-2010)	2009–10	Prva HNL	10	0	2	0	—		13	0
Varteks (renamed Varaždin in mid-2010)	2010–11	Prva HNL	21	1	4	0	—		25	1
Varteks (renamed Varaždin in mid-2010)	2011–12	Prva HNL	5	0	0	0	4 (Note: Appearances in UEFA Europa League)	0	9	0
Varteks (renamed Varaždin in mid-2010)	Total		36	1	6	0	4	0	46	1
Rijeka	2011–12	Prva HNL	2	0	0	0	—		2	0
Rijeka	2012–13	Prva HNL	0	0	0	0	—		0	0
Rijeka	Total		2	0	0	0	0	0	2	0
Pomorac	2012–13	Druga HNL	15	4	0	0	—		15	4
Dynamo Dresden	2013–14	2. Bundesliga	17	1	0	0	—		17	1
Wiener Neustadt	2014–15	Austrian Bundesliga	18	1	1	0	—		19	1
Erzgebirge Aue	2015–16	3. Liga	32	0	3	0	—		35	0
Erzgebirge Aue	2016–17	2. Bundesliga	13	0	0	0	—		13	0
Erzgebirge Aue	Total		45	0	3	0	0	0	48	0
VfL Osnabrück	2017–18	3. Liga	33	1	2	0	—		35	1
VfL Osnabrück	2018–19	2. Bundesliga	36	0	0	0	—		36	0
VfL Osnabrück	2019–20	2. Bundesliga	8	0	0	0	—		8	0
VfL Osnabrück	Total		77	1	2	0	0	0	79	1
Career total			210	8	12	0	4	0	226	8
