= Alban Sabah =

Togolese-German footballer

Personal information
- Date of birth: 22 June 1992 (age 34)
- Place of birth: Kpalime, Togo
- Height: 1.89 m (6 ft 2 in)
- Position: Centre-back

Youth career
- 1999–2001: Ratingen 04/19
- 2001–2005: DJK Blau-Weiß Gelsenkirchen
- 2005–2009: SG Wattenscheid 09
- 2009–2011: Schalke 04

Senior career*
Years	Team	Apps	(Gls)
2011–2013	Schalke 04 II	61	(9)
2013–2015	Dynamo Dresden	11	(0)
2013–2015	Dynamo Dresden II	16	(1)
2015–2016	Waldhof Mannheim	10	(0)
2016–2017	SSVg Velbert	19	(3)
2017	→ Sportfreunde Siegen (loan)	10	(0)
2017–2020	FSV Frankfurt	43	(3)

International career
2009–2010	Germany U18	7	(0)
2014	Togo	2	(0)
- * Club domestic league appearances and goals

Alban Sabah (born 22 June 1992) is a Togolese former footballer who played as a centre-back. He also holds German citizenship.

== Career ==
Sabah was born in Kpalime. He made his senior debut for Schalke 04 when he traveled to Israel for the club's Europa League clash against Israeli Premier League team Maccabi Haifa in which Schalke were 3–1 winners.
