= 2016–17 TSV 1860 Munich season =

1860 Munich
2016–17 season
- Chairman: Hasan Ismaik
- Head Coach: Kosta Runjaić (until 22 November); Daniel Bierofka (interim, 22 November - 31 December); Vítor Pereira (from 1 January)
- Stadium: Allianz Arena
- 2. Bundesliga: 16th
- DFB-Pokal: Round of 16
- Top goalscorer: League: Michael Liendl (8); All: Michael Liendl (8)
- Highest home attendance: 62,200 vs Jahn Regensburg (30 May 2017)
- Lowest home attendance: 15,300 vs 1. FC Heidenheim (16 December 2016)
- Average home league attendance: 25,900
Home colours	Away colours	Third colours

The 2016–17 TSV 1860 Munich season was the club's 13th consecutive season in the 2. Bundesliga.

== Season events ==
=== June ===
On 7 June, 1860 announced the appointment of Kosta Runjaić as their new head coach.

On 10 June, 1860 announced that they had extended their loan deal with Werder Bremen for Levent Ayçiçek for another season.

On 20 June, 1860 announced the season-long loan signing of Marnon Busch from Werder Bremen.

On 22 June, 1860 announced that they had accepted a request from Gary Kagelmacher to leave the club, and that he had joined Maccabi Haifa.

On 23 June, 1860 announced the signing of Jan Zimmermann from FC Heidenheim on a contract until June 2018.

On 29 June, 1860 announced the signing of Karim Matmour from Huddersfield Town on a contract until June 2018, and that Christoph Daferner had left the club in order to sign for Huddersfield Town.

=== July ===
On 10 July, 1860 announced the signing of Filip Stojković from Čukarički, on a contract until June 2021.

On 14 July, 1860 announced that they had signed new contracts with academy graduates Florian Neuhaus and Christoph Daferner, until June 2019.

On 21 July, 1860 announced that they had signed Victor Andrade on loan from Benfica for the season.

On 27 July, 1860 announced the signing of Fanol Përdedaj from FSV Frankfurt until June 2019, and the signing of Ivica Olić from Hamburger SV on a contract until June 2017. Also on the same day, 1860 announced that Rodri had left the club after his contract that was due to expire in June 2017 was terminated by mutual agreement.

On 29 July, 1860 announced the signing of Ribamar from Botafogo, on a contract until June 2021.

On 30 July, 1860 announced the return of Stefan Aigner to the club, signing from Eintracht Frankfurt, on a contract until the summer of 2020.

=== August ===
On 26 August, 1860 announced that their contract with Ilie Sánchez, that was due to expire in the June 2017, had been terminated early by mutual agreement.

On 30 August, Sertan Yiğenoğlu left 1860 to sign for Wehen Wiesbaden.

=== October ===
On 6 October, 1860 announced the signing of Sebastian Boenisch on a contract until 30 June 2018.

=== November ===
On 22 November, 1860 announced the departure of Kosta Runjaić as their head coach, with Daniel Bierofka taking charge in an interim basis.

=== December ===
On 18 December, 1860 announced the appointment of Vítor Pereira as their new head coach, on a contract until 30 June 2018, commencing on 1 January.

=== January ===
On 17 January, Vitus Eicher left 1860 to sign for FC Heidenheim.

On 26 January, 1860 announced that Miloš Degenek had left the club to sign for Yokohama F. Marinos, and that Abdoulaye Ba had joined the club on loan for the remainder of the season. Later the same day, 1860 announced the signing of Amilton on a contract until the summer of 2020, and the loan signing of Lumor until the end of the season, both from Portimonense.

On 30 January, 1860 announced the signing of Christian Gytkjær from Rosenborg on a contract until the summer of 2019.

On 31 January, Stefan Mugoša joined Karlsruher SC on loan from 1860 for the remainder of the season, and Frank Boya signed for 1860 from APEJES Academy, on a contract until the summer of 2018.

=== February ===
On 3 February 1860 announced that their contract with Goran Šukalo, that was due to expire in the summer, had been terminated early by mutual agreement.

On 9 February, 1860 announced that their contract with Rodnei, that was due to expire in the summer, had been terminated early by mutual agreement.

== Squad ==
As of match played 30 May 2017

No.	Name	Nationality	Position	Date of birth (age)	Signed from	Signed in	Contract ends	Apps.	Goals
Goalkeepers
21	Jan Zimmermann	(Germany)	GK	19 April 1985 (aged 32)	FC Heidenheim	2016	2018	15	0
24	Stefan Ortega	(Germany)	GK	6 November 1992 (aged 24)	Arminia Bielefeld	2014		64	0
Defenders
2	Jan Mauersberger	(Germany)	DF	17 June 1985 (aged 31)	Karlsruher SC	2016	2018	34	2
3	Maximilian Wittek	(Germany)	DF	21 August 1995 (aged 21)	Academy	2014		81	1
4	Kai Bülow	(Germany)	DF	31 May 1986 (aged 30)	Hansa Rostock	2010		187	15
6	Sebastian Boenisch	(Poland)	DF	1 February 1987 (aged 30)	Unattached	2016	2018	15	0
16	Marnon Busch	(Germany)	DF	8 December 1994 (aged 22)	on loan from Werder Bremen	2016	2017	13	0
17	Felix Uduokhai	(Germany)	DF	9 September 1997 (aged 19)	Academy	2016		22	1
22	Filip Stojković	(Montenegro)	DF	22 January 1993 (aged 24)	Čukarički	2016	2021	10	0
25	Abdoulaye Ba	(Senegal)	DF	1 January 1991 (aged 26)	on loan from Porto	2017	2017	18	3
26	Kilian Jakob	(Germany)	DF	25 January 1998 (aged 19)	Academy	2016		1	0
28	Lumor	(Ghana)	DF	15 August 1996 (aged 20)	on loan from Portimonense	2017	2017	19	2
35	Marin Pongračić	(Croatia)	DF	11 September 1997 (aged 19)	Ingolstadt 04	2016		7	0
44	Felix Weber	(Germany)	DF	18 January 1995 (aged 22)	Academy	2016		3	0
Midfielders
5	Fanol Përdedaj	(Kosovo)	MF	16 July 1991 (aged 25)	FSV Frankfurt	2016	2019	17	0
7	Daylon Claasen	(South Africa)	MF	28 January 1990 (aged 27)	Lech Poznań	2014			
10	Michael Liendl	(Austria)	MF	25 October 1985 (aged 31)	Fortuna Düsseldorf	2015			
11	Daniel Adlung	(Germany)	MF	1 October 1987 (aged 29)	Energie Cottbus	2013			
19	Florian Neuhaus	(Germany)	MF	16 March 1997 (aged 20)	Academy	2016	2019	15	1
29	Stefan Aigner	(Germany)	MF	20 August 1987 (aged 29)	Eintracht Frankfurt	2016	2020		
33	Levent Ayçiçek	(Germany)	MF	14 February 1994 (aged 23)	on loan from Werder Bremen	2016	2017	41	6
38	Romuald Lacazette	(France)	MF	3 January 1994 (aged 23)	Paris Saint-Germain	2015	2017	36	1
Forwards
8	Karim Matmour	(Algeria)	FW	25 June 1985 (aged 31)	Huddersfield Town	2015	2018	14	0
9	Christian Gytkjær	(Denmark)	FW	6 May 1990 (aged 27)	Rosenborg	2017	2019	18	2
12	Ribamar	(Brazil)	FW	21 May 1997 (aged 20)	Rosenborg	2016	2021	4	0
13	Sascha Mölders	(Germany)	FW	20 March 1985 (aged 32)	Augsburg	2016		38	7
14	Krisztián Simon	(Hungary)	FW	10 June 1991 (aged 25)	Újpest	2015		13	1
18	Nico Karger	(Germany)	FW	1 February 1993 (aged 24)	Academy	2015		20	0
30	Amilton	(Brazil)	FW	12 August 1989 (aged 27)	Portimonense	2017	2020	15	0
31	Victor Andrade	(Brazil)	FW	30 September 1995 (aged 21)	on loan from Benfica	2016	2017	9	1
40	Ivica Olić	(Croatia)	FW	14 September 1979 (aged 37)	Hamburger SV	2016	2017	33	5
Out on loan
9	Stefan Mugoša	(Montenegro)	FW	26 February 1992 (aged 25)	FC Kaiserslautern	2015	2018	33	1
Left during the season
1	Vitus Eicher	(Germany)	GK	5 November 1990 (aged 26)	Academy	2010		35	0
15	Goran Šukalo	(Slovenia)	MF	24 August 1981 (aged 35)	Greuther Fürth	2016	2017	1	0
20	Rodnei	(Brazil)	DF	11 September 1985 (aged 31)	Red Bull Salzburg	2015	2017	8	0
30	Miloš Degenek	(Australia)	DF	28 April 1994 (aged 23)	VfB Stuttgart II	2015		37	1
	Rodri	(Spain)	MF	6 June 1990 (aged 26)	Barcelona	2014	2017	6	1
	Ilie Sánchez	(Spain)	MF	21 November 1990 (aged 26)	Barcelona	2014	2017	26	1

== Transfers ==
=== In ===
Date	Position	Nationality	Name	From	Fee	Ref.
23 June 2016 (Note: Transfer announced on the shown date, becoming official on 1 July 2025.)	GK	(Germany)	Jan Zimmermann	FC Heidenheim	Undisclosed	
29 June 2016	FW	(Algeria)	Karim Matmour	Huddersfield Town	Undisclosed	
10 July 2016	DF	(Montenegro)	Filip Stojković	Čukarički	Undisclosed	
27 July 2016	MF	(Kosovo)	Fanol Përdedaj	FSV Frankfurt	Undisclosed	
27 July 2016	FW	(Croatia)	Ivica Olić	Hamburger SV	Undisclosed	
29 July 2016	FW	(Brazil)	Ribamar	Botafogo	Undisclosed	
30 July 2016	MF	(Germany)	Stefan Aigner	Eintracht Frankfurt	Undisclosed	
6 October 2016	DF	(Poland)	Sebastian Boenisch	Unattached	Free	
26 January 2017	FW	(Brazil)	Amilton	Portimonense	Undisclosed	
30 January 2017	FW	(Denmark)	Christian Gytkjær	Rosenborg	Undisclosed	
31 January 2017	MF	(Cameroon)	Frank Boya	APEJES Academy	Undisclosed	

=== Loans in ===
Start date	Position	Nationality	Name	From	End date	Ref.
20 June 2016 (Note: Transfer announced on the shown date, becoming official on 1 July 2025.)	DF	(Germany)	Marnon Busch	Werder Bremen	30 June 2017	
21 July 2016	FW	(Brazil)	Victor Andrade	Benfica	30 June 2017	
26 January 2017	DF	(Ghana)	Lumor	Portimonense	30 June 2017	
26 January 2017	DF	(Senegal)	Abdoulaye Ba	Porto	30 June 2017	

=== Out ===
Date	Position	Nationality	Name	To	Fee	Ref.
30 August 2026	DF	(Germany)	Sertan Yiğenoğlu	Wehen Wiesbaden	Undisclosed	
17 January 2017	GK	(Germany)	Vitus Eicher	FC Heidenheim	Undisclosed	
26 January 2017	DF	(Australia)	Miloš Degenek	Yokohama F. Marinos	Undisclosed	

=== Loans out ===
Start date	Position	Nationality	Name	To	End date	Ref.
31 January 2017	FW	(Montenegro)	Stefan Mugoša	Karlsruher SC	30 June 2017	

=== Released ===
Date	Position	Nationality	Name	Joined	Date	Ref
27 July 2016	MF	(Spain)	Rodri	Córdoba	27 July 2016	
26 August 2016	MF	(Spain)	Ilie Sánchez	Sporting Kansas City	13 January 2017	
3 February 2017	MF	(Slovenia)	Goran Šukalo			
9 February 2017	DF	(Brazil)	Rodnei	Blau-Weiß Linz	23 January 2018	
30 June 2017	GK	(Germany)	Stefan Ortega	Arminia Bielefeld		
30 June 2017	GK	(Germany)	Jan Zimmermann	Eintracht Frankfurt	22 August 2017	
30 June 2017	DF	(Germany)	Maximilian Wittek	Greuther Fürth	1 July 2017	
30 June 2017	DF	(Germany)	Kai Bülow	Karlsruher SC		
30 June 2017	DF	(Poland)	Sebastian Boenisch	Floridsdorfer	27 August 2019	
30 June 2017	DF	(Montenegro)	Filip Stojković	Red Star Belgrade	1 July 2017	
30 June 2017	MF	(Kosovo)	Fanol Përdedaj	FC Saarbrücken		
30 June 2017	MF	(South Africa)	Daylon Claasen	Bidvest Wits		
30 June 2017	MF	(Austria)	Michael Liendl	Twente		
30 June 2017	MF	(Germany)	Florian Neuhaus	Borussia Mönchengladbach		
30 June 2017	MF	(Germany)	Stefan Aigner	Colorado Rapids	27 July 2017	
30 June 2017	MF	(France)	Romuald Lacazette	Darmstadt 98		
30 June 2017	FW	(Algeria)	Karim Matmour	Adelaide United	25 August 2017	
30 June 2017	FW	(Denmark)	Christian Gytkjær	Lech Poznań	1 July 2017	
30 June 2017	FW	(Brazil)	Ribamar	Athletico Paranaense		
30 June 2017	FW	(Hungary)	Krisztián Simon	Újpest		
30 June 2017	FW	(Brazil)	Amilton	Aves		
30 June 2017	FW	(Croatia)	Ivica Olić	Darmstadt 98		
30 June 2017	FW	(Montenegro)	Stefan Mugoša	Sheriff Tiraspol	1 July 2017	

== Competitions ==
=== Overall record ===
Competition	First match	Last match	Starting round	Final position	Record							
Competition	First match	Last match	Starting round	Final position	Pld	W	D	L	GF	GA	GD	Win %
2. Bundesliga	7 August 2016	21 May 2017	Matchday 1	16th	34	10	6	18	37	47	−10	29.41
Relegation play-off	26 May 2017	30 May 2017	1st leg	Relegated	2	0	1	1	1	3	−2	0.00
DFB-Pokal	20 August 2016	8 February 2017	First Round	Round of 16	3	1	1	1	2	3	−1	33.33
Total					39	11	8	20	40	53	−13	28.21

Last updated: 30 May 2017
Source: Competitions

=== 2. Bundesliga ===
==== League table ====
Pos	Team	Pld	W	D	L	GF	GA	GD	Pts	Promotion, qualification or relegation
14	Erzgebirge Aue	34	10	9	15	37	52	−15	39	
15	Arminia Bielefeld	34	8	13	13	50	54	−4	37	
16	1860 Munich (Note: 1860 Munich, who lost in the relegation play-offs, were unable to obtain a license for the 2017–18 3. Liga. Therefore, 1860 Munich was relegated to the Regionalliga Bayern.) (R)	34	10	6	18	37	47	−10	36	Qualification for relegation play-offs
17	Würzburger Kickers (R)	34	7	13	14	32	41	−9	34	Relegation to 3. Liga
18	Karlsruher SC (R)	34	5	10	19	27	56	−29	25	Relegation to 3. Liga

Source: DFB
Rules for classification: 1) Points; 2) Goal difference; 3) Goals scored
(R) Relegated

==== Results summary ====
Overall								Home						Away					
Pld	W	D	L	GF	GA	GD	Pts	W	D	L	GF	GA	GD	W	D	L	GF	GA	GD
34	10	6	18	37	47	−10	36	7	4	6	24	21	+3	3	2	12	13	26	−13

Last updated: 21 May 2017.

==== Results by round ====
Round	1	2	3	4	5	6	7	8	9	10	11	12	13	14	15	16	17	18	19	20	21	22	23	24	25	26	27	28	29	30	31	32	33	34
Ground	A	H	A	A	H	A	H	A	H	A	H	A	H	A	H	A	H	H	A	H	H	A	H	A	H	A	H	A	H	A	H	A	H	A
Result	L	W	D	W	L	D	L	L	L	L	W	L	D	L	W	L	D	W	L	W	W	L	L	L	W	W	D	L	D	L	L	W	L	L
Position	16	8	10	6	9	9	11	14	14	16	13	14	14	14	14	14	14	13	14	14	14	14	14	14	13	12	12	14	12	15	16	14	16	16
Points	0	3	4	7	7	8	8	8	8	8	11	11	12	12	15	15	16	19	19	22	25	25	25	25	28	31	32	32	33	33	33	36	36	36

Updated to match(es) played on 21 May 2017. Source:
A = Away; H = Home; W = Win; D = Draw; L = Loss

==== Results ====
7 August 2026 1	Greuther Fürth	1–0	1860 Munich	Fürth
13:30 CEST (UTC+2)	Gießelmann (yellow card) 6'; Freis (yellow card) 21'; Žulj 45' (yellow card) 89'	Report	Busch (yellow card) 39'; Degenek (yellow card) 41'; Adlung (yellow card) 81'; Claasen (yellow card) 82'	Stadium: Sportpark Ronhof Thomas Sommer; Attendance: 13,205; Referee: Felix Zwayer

14 August 2016 2	1860 Munich	1–0	Arminia Bielefeld	Munich
15:30 CEST (UTC+2)	Matmour (yellow card) 42'; Stojković (yellow card) 53'; Wittek (yellow card) 62'; Aigner 67'	Report	Schütz (yellow card) 34'; Görlitz (yellow card) 36'	Stadium: Allianz Arena; Attendance: 24,800; Referee: Sven Jablonski

27 August 2016 3	Karlsruher SC	0–0	1860 Munich	Karlsruhe
13:00 CEST (UTC+2)	Torres (yellow card) 51' (yellow-red card) 57'	Report	Mauersberger (yellow card) 9'; Wittek (yellow card) 30'; Përdedaj (yellow card) 62'; Matmour (yellow card) 90'	Stadium: Wildparkstadion; Attendance: 16,800; Referee: Guido Winkmann

12 September 2016 4	FC Nürnberg	1–2	1860 Munich	Nuremberg
20:15 CEST (UTC+2)	Matavž 17'; Burgstaller (yellow card) 20' (yellow-red card) 73'; Sepsi (yellow card) 70'; Möhwald (yellow card) 80'; Salli (yellow card) 85'	Report	Mölders 11'; Claasen (yellow card) 32'; Liendl 79'; Zimmermann (yellow card) 84'; Andrade (yellow card) 90+3'	Stadium: Max-Morlock-Stadion; Attendance: 30,635; Referee: Bastian Dankert

16 September 2016 5	1860 Munich	1–2	Union Berlin	Munich
18:30 CEST (UTC+2)	Liendl 25'; Përdedaj (yellow card) 41'; Adlung (yellow card) 65'; Wittek (yellow card) 83'	Report	Skrzybski 5'; Redondo 40'; Schönheim (yellow card) 53' (yellow-red card) 53'; Kroos (yellow card) 63'; Busk (yellow card) 72'	Stadium: Allianz Arena; Attendance: 19,300; Referee: Florian Heft

22 September 2016 6	St. Pauli	2–2	1860 Munich	Hamburg
20:15 CEST (UTC+2)	Buchtmann 16'; Buballa (yellow card) 54'; Hedenstad (yellow card) 61'; Nehrig (yellow card) 69' (goal) 76'	Report	Mauersberger (yellow card) 11'; Mölders (yellow card) 52'; Matmour (yellow card) 60'; Liendl 70'; Përdedaj (yellow card) 75'; Andrade 77' (yellow card) 78'; Adlung (yellow card) 86'; Wittek (yellow card) 90+3'	Stadium: Millerntor-Stadion; Attendance: 29,000; Referee: Robert Kampka

25 September 2016 7	1860 Munich	0–2	Hannover 96	Munich
13:30 CEST (UTC+2)	Matmour (yellow card) 79'	Report	Karaman 67'; Albornoz (yellow card) 76'; Harnik 87'	Stadium: Allianz Arena; Attendance: 26,100; Referee: Timo Gerach

2 October 2016 8	Würzburger Kickers	2–0	1860 Munich	Würzburg
13:30 CEST (UTC+2)	Soriano 27'; Schoppenhauer (yellow card) 41'; Pisot (yellow card) 77'; Müller 83'	Report	Adlung (yellow card) 8'; Zimmermann (yellow card) 26'; Mölders (yellow card) 64'; Andrade (yellow card) 74'	Stadium: Akon Arena; Attendance: 12,475; Referee: Martin Petersen

16 October 2016 9	1860 Munich	1–3	Fortuna Düsseldorf	Munich
13:30 CEST (UTC+2)	Përdedaj (yellow card) 8'; Bülow (yellow card) 26'; Mauersberger (yellow card) 61'; Liendl 81'	Report	Bellinghausen (yellow card) 3'; Hennings 6'; Bebou 25'; Sobottka 36'; Akpoguma (yellow card) 70' (yellow-red card) 80'; Ayhan (yellow card) 87'	Stadium: Allianz Arena; Attendance: 21,800; Referee: Lasse Koslowski

21 October 2016 10	VfB Stuttgart	2–1	1860 Munich	Stuttgart
18:30 CEST (UTC+2)	Özcan 6'; Mané (yellow card) 15'; Terodde 18'; Gentner (yellow card) 21'; M.Zimmermann (yellow card) 34'; Großkreutz (yellow card) 43'; Šunjić (yellow card) 49'; Maxim (yellow card) 90+4'	Report	Ayçiçek 35'; Rodnei (yellow card) 43'; Wittek (yellow card) 56'; Neuhaus (yellow card) 60'; Mauersberger (yellow card) 64'	Stadium: MHPArena; Attendance: 55,100; Referee: Arne Aarnink

28 October 2016 11	1860 Munich	6–2	Erzgebirge Aue	Munich
18:30 CEST (UTC+2)	Ayçiçek 16', 72'; Liendl 23', 43'; Mölders 49'; Mauersberger (yellow card) 59'; Adlung 90'	Report	Riedel (yellow card) 21'; Köpke 28'; Hertner (red card) 42'; Soukou 55'; Kaufmann (yellow card) 72'; Wegner (yellow card) 86'	Stadium: Allianz Arena; Attendance: 16,600; Referee: Thorben Siewer

6 November 2016 12	SV Sandhausen	3–2	1860 Munich	Sandhausen
13:30 CET (UTC+1)	Derstroff 1'; Kister (yellow card) 32'; Gordon 64'; Wooten 73'; Paqarada (yellow card) 79'; Vunguidica (yellow card) 90'	Report	Olić 12' (yellow card) 23'; Uduokhai 43'; Mölders (yellow card) 52'; Rodnei (yellow card) 67'	Stadium: Hardtwaldstadion; Attendance: 5,435; Referee: Robert Kampka

21 November 2016 13	1860 Munich	1–1	FC Kaiserslautern	Munich
20:15 CET (UTC+1)	Olić 9'; Matmour (yellow card) 79'	Report	Stieber 44'	Stadium: Allianz Arena; Attendance: 17,600; Referee: Bibiana Steinhaus

27 November 2016 14	Eintracht Braunschweig	2–1	1860 Munich	Braunschweig
13:30 CET (UTC+1)	Nyman 16'; Decarli (yellow card) 51'; Kumbela 65'	Report	Lacazette (yellow card) 18'; Aigner (yellow card) 31'; Adlung (yellow card) 34'; Olić 72'; Mauersberger (yellow card) 90'	Stadium: Eintracht-Stadion; Attendance: 20,850; Referee: Patrick Alt

3 December 2016 15	1860 Munich	1–0	Dynamo Dresden	Munich
13:00 CET (UTC+1)	Mauersberger (yellow card) 35'; Wittek (yellow card) 35'; Liendl (yellow card) 42'; Bülow (yellow card) 80'; Ayçiçek 89'; Mölders (yellow card) 90+1'	Report	Aosman (yellow card) 37'	Stadium: Allianz Arena; Attendance: 43,400; Referee: Sören Storks

10 December 2016 16	VfL Bochum	1–0	1860 Munich	Bochum
13:00 CET (UTC+1)	Riemann (yellow card) 56'; Wurtz (yellow card) 70'; Canouse 77'	Report	Neuhaus (yellow card) 57'; Wittek (yellow card) 61'; Bülow (yellow card) 67'	Stadium: Ruhrstadion; Attendance: 15,239; Referee: Benedikt Kempkes

16 December 2016 17	1860 Munich	1–1	FC Heidenheim	Munich
18:30 CET (UTC+1)	Stojković (yellow card) 2'; Mölders 27' (yellow card) 78'; Ayçiçek (yellow card) 49'; Përdedaj (yellow card) 55'; Uduokhai (yellow card) 71'; Adlung (yellow card) 82'	Report	Strauß (yellow card) 33'; Griesbeck (yellow card) 55'; Schnatterer 72'; Beermann (yellow card) 73'; Halloran (yellow card) 78'	Stadium: Allianz Arena; Attendance: 15,300; Referee: Robert Kempter

27 January 2017 18	1860 Munich	2–1	Greuther Fürth	Munich
18:30 CET (UTC+1)	Adlung (yellow card) 30'; Stojković (yellow card) 34'; Olić 43'; Aigner (yellow card) 69'; Claasen (yellow card) 70'; Liendl 86'	Report	Dursun 13'; Sama (yellow card) 40' (yellow-red card) 49'	Stadium: Allianz Arena; Attendance: 15,800; Referee: Sven Jablonski

3 February 2017 19	Arminia Bielefeld	2–1	1860 Munich	Bielefeld
18:30 CET (UTC+1)	Klos 12', 38'; Voglsammer (yellow card) 29'; Schuppan (yellow card) 80'; Börner (yellow card) 82'	Report	Gytkjær 13'; Olić (yellow card) 35'; Ba (yellow card) 37'; Amilton (yellow card) 70'	Stadium: Bielefelder Alm; Attendance: 16,247; Referee: Bastian Dankert

11 February 2017 20	1860 Munich	2–1	Karlsruher SC	Munich
13:00 CET (UTC+1)	Olić 57'; Boenisch (yellow card) 79'; Bülow 90+5'	Report	Figueras 48'; Prömel (yellow card) 50' (yellow-red card) 90+4'; Kinsombi (yellow card) 63'; Yamada (yellow card) 65'; Meffert (yellow card) 76'; Stoppelkamp (yellow card) 90+1'	Stadium: Allianz Arena; Attendance: 18,100; Referee: Martin Thomsen

20 February 2017 21	1860 Munich	2–0	FC Nürnberg	Munich
20:15 CET (UTC+1)	Ba (yellow card) 12' (goal) 16'; Amilton (yellow card) 19'; Lumor 39'; Bülow (yellow card) 65'	Report	Lippert (yellow card) 11'; Hovland (yellow card) 25'; Möhwald (yellow card) 74'	Stadium: Allianz Arena; Attendance: 24,100; Referee: Frank Willenborg

24 February 2017 22	Union Berlin	2–0	1860 Munich	Hanover
18:30 CET (UTC+1)	Kreilach (yellow card) 17'; Skrzybski 41'; Hedlund (yellow card) 44' (goal) 61'; Parensen (yellow card) 52'	Report	Ba (yellow card) 47'	Stadium: Niedersachsenstadion; Attendance: 20,176; Referee: Timo Gerach

4 March 2017 23	1860 Munich	1–2	St. Pauli	Munich
13:00 CET (UTC+1)	Lumor 27'; Ba (yellow card) 35'; Uduokhai (yellow card) 50'; Amilton (yellow card) 90+2'; Gytkjær (yellow card) 90+3'	Report	Sobiech 36'; Bouhaddouz 41' (yellow card) 81'; Ziereis (yellow card) 67'	Stadium: Allianz Arena; Attendance: 30,300; Referee: Bibiana Steinhaus

11 March 2017 24	Hannover 96	1–0	1860 Munich	Hanover
13:00 CET (UTC+1)	Sané (yellow card) 49'; Harnik 55'; Maier (yellow card) 60'; Prib (yellow card) 81'	Report	Lacazette (yellow card) 90'	Stadium: Niedersachsenstadion; Attendance: 34,600; Referee: Daniel Schlager

17 March 2017 25	1860 Munich	2–1	Würzburger Kickers	Munich
18:30 CET (UTC+1)	Amilton (yellow card) 13'; Ba 67'; Aigner (yellow card) 72'; Liendl 78'	Report	Soriano (yellow card) 15'; Schoppenhauer (yellow card) 59'; Kurzweg (yellow card) 77' (goal) 90+2'	Stadium: Allianz Arena; Attendance: 22,600; Referee: Arne Aarnink

31 March 2017 26	Fortuna Düsseldorf	0–1	1860 Munich	Düsseldorf
18:30 CEST (UTC+2)	Fink (yellow card) 43'; Sobottka 69'; Schmitz (yellow card) 90+5'	Report	Aigner 55'	Stadium: Merkur Spiel-Arena; Attendance: 23,778; Referee: Manuel Gräfe

5 April 2017 27	1860 Munich	1–1	VfB Stuttgart	Munich
17:30 CEST (UTC+2)	Lacazette 23'; Amilton (yellow card) 79'; Bülow (yellow card) 90+1'	Report	Ofori (yellow card) 45'; Kamiński 90+2'	Stadium: Allianz Arena; Attendance: 47,100; Referee: Patrick Alt

9 April 2017 28	Erzgebirge Aue	3–0	1860 Munich	Aue-Bad Schlema
13:30 CEST (UTC+2)	Nazarov 42', 73'; Soukou 49'	Report	Lacazette (yellow card) 37'; Boenisch (red card) 41'; Mauersberger (yellow card) 64'; Neuhaus (yellow card) 78'	Stadium: Eins Erzgebirgsstadion; Attendance: 10,000; Referee: Sascha Stegemann

16 April 2017 29	1860 Munich	1–1	SV Sandhausen	Munich
13:30 CEST (UTC+2)	Bülow 45+1'; Pongračić (yellow card) 74'; Lacazette (yellow card) 89'; Amilton (yellow card) 90'	Report	Kister (yellow card) 19'; Karl (yellow card) 65' (goal) 82'; Höler (yellow card) 90'; Knipping (yellow card) 90'; Knaller (yellow card) 90+2'	Stadium: Allianz Arena; Attendance: 17,600; Referee: Thorben Siewer

21 April 2017 30	FC Kaiserslautern	1–0	1860 Munich	Kaiserslautern
18:30 CEST (UTC+2)	Gytkjær 73' (o.g.)	Report	Gytkjær (yellow card) 68'; Ba (yellow card) 76'; Mölders (yellow card) 82'	Stadium: Fritz-Walter-Stadion; Attendance: 27,906; Referee: Martin Petersen

30 April 2017 31	1860 Munich	0–1	Eintracht Braunschweig	Munich
13:30 CEST (UTC+2)	Aigner (yellow card) 2'; Amilton (yellow card) 50'; Pongračić (yellow card) 63'	Report	Sauer (yellow card) 48'; Decarli (yellow card) 53'; Nyman 55'; Fejzić (yellow card) 90'	Stadium: Allianz Arena; Attendance: 39,500; Referee: Sören Storks

5 May 2017 32	Dynamo Dresden	1–2	1860 Munich	Dresden
18:30 CEST (UTC+2)	Hartmann (yellow card) 10' (goal) 89'; Aosman (yellow card) 79'; Kreuzer (yellow card) 86'	Report	Gytkjær 43'; Ayçiçek 46'; Busch (yellow card) 63' (yellow-red card) 69'	Stadium: Rudolf-Harbig-Stadion; Attendance: 29,564; Referee: Robert Schröder

14 May 2017 33	1860 Munich	1–2	VfL Bochum	Munich
15:30 CEST (UTC+2)	Ba 34'	Report	Mlapa 31'; Sağlam (yellow card) 33'; Stiepermann (yellow card) 68'; Weilandt 79'	Stadium: Allianz Arena; Attendance: 40,300; Referee: Daniel Schlager

21 May 2017 34	FC Heidenheim	2–1	1860 Munich	Heidenheim an der Brenz
15:30 CEST (UTC+2)	Schnatterer 86' (yellow card) 88'; Philp (yellow card) 90+3'; Kleindienst 90+4'	Report	Ba (yellow card) 6'; Liendl (yellow card) 49'; Aigner 62'; Mölders (yellow card) 79'; Pongračić (yellow card) 82'	Stadium: Voith-Arena; Attendance: 15,000; Referee: Guido Winkmann

==== Relegation play-off ====
26 May 2017 1st leg	Jahn Regensburg	1–1	1860 Munich	Regensburg
18:00 CEST (UTC+2)	Lais 2'; Nachreiner (yellow card) 57'	Report	Pongračić (yellow card) 25' (yellow-red card) 80'; Lacazette (yellow card) 36'; Ayçiçek (yellow card) 40'; Neuhaus 78'	Stadium: Continental Arena; Attendance: 15,224; Referee: Patrick Ittrich

30 May 2017 2nd leg	1860 Munich	0–2 (1–3 agg.)	Jahn Regensburg	Munich
18:00 CEST (UTC+2)	Neuhaus (yellow card) 44'; Ba (yellow card) 56'; Mölders (yellow card) 77'	Report	Pusch 30'; Lais 41'; Thommy (yellow card) 90'	Stadium: Allianz Arena; Attendance: 62,200; Referee: Daniel Siebert

=== DFB-Pokal ===
20 August 2016 First round	1860 Munich	2–1	Karlsruher SC	Munich
18:30 CEST (UTC+2)	Matmour (yellow card) 40' (goal) 90+2'; Aigner 60'; Përdedaj (yellow card) 65'; Mauersberger (yellow card) 84'	Report	Figueras (yellow card) 17'; Diamantakos 67' (yellow card) 74'	Stadium: Allianz Arena; Attendance: 16,800; Referee: Sascha Stegemann

25 October 2016 Second round	Würzburger Kickers	0–0 (a.e.t.) (3–4 p)	1860 Munich	Würzburg
18:30 CET (UTC+1)	Díaz (yellow card) 83'	Report	Uduokhai (yellow card) 9'; Neuhaus (yellow card) 29'; Përdedaj (yellow card) 45'; Adlung (yellow card) 88'	Stadium: flyeralarm Arena; Attendance: 12,142; Referee: Markus Schmidt
	Penalties
	Rama (penalty scored); Soriano (penalty missed); Benatelli (penalty scored); Pisot (penalty scored); Daghfous (penalty missed)		(penalty scored) Ayçiçek; (penalty scored) Uduokhai; (penalty scored) Wittek; (penalty missed) Stojković; (penalty scored) Mölders

8 February 2017 Round of 16	Sportfreunde Lotte	2–0	1860 Munich	Lotte
20:30 CET (UTC+1)	Rahn (yellow card) 17'; Lindner 28'; Gorschlüter (yellow card) 55'; Freiberger 58'	Report	Aigner (yellow card) 10'; Boenisch (yellow card) 58'; Stojković (yellow card) 61'; Lumor (yellow card) 74'; Wittek (yellow card) 79'; Përdedaj (yellow card) 81'; Ba (yellow card) 90+2'; Ribamar (red card) 90+3'	Stadium: FRIMO Stadion; Attendance: 10,059; Referee: Christian Dingert

== Squad statistics ==
As of match played 30 May 2017

=== Appearances and goals ===
Players with no appearances are not included on the list
Italics indicate a loaned in player

No.	Pos	Nat	Player	Total		2. Bundesliga		Relegation play-off		DFB-Pokal	
No.	Pos	Nat	Player	Apps	Goals	Apps	Goals	Apps	Goals	Apps	Goals
2	DF	(Germany) GER	Jan Mauersberger	20	0	16+1	0	0	0	3	0
3	DF	(Germany) GER	Maximilian Wittek	29	0	23+2	0	0+1	0	3	0
4	DF	(Germany) GER	Kai Bülow	23	2	13+8	2	1	0	0+1	0
5	MF	(Kosovo) KOS	Fanol Përdedaj	17	0	13+1	0	0	0	2+1	0
6	DF	(Poland) POL	Sebastian Boenisch	15	0	13+1	0	0	0	1	0
7	MF	(South Africa) RSA	Daylon Claasen	15	0	8+6	0	0	0	1	0
8	FW	(Algeria) ALG	Karim Matmour	14	0	10+3	0	0	0	1	0
9	FW	(Denmark) DEN	Christian Gytkjær	18	2	7+8	2	1+1	0	1	0
10	MF	(Austria) AUT	Michael Liendl	32	8	20+8	8	2	0	2	0
11	MF	(Germany) GER	Daniel Adlung	17	1	14+1	1	0	0	2	0
12	FW	(Brazil) BRA	Ribamar	4	0	0+3	0	0	0	0+1	0
13	FW	(Germany) GER	Sascha Mölders	23	3	14+6	3	1+1	0	1	0
16	DF	(Germany) GER	Marnon Busch	13	0	11	0	2	0	0	0
17	DF	(Germany) GER	Felix Uduokhai	22	1	20+1	1	0	0	1	0
18	FW	(Germany) GER	Nico Karger	6	0	1+4	0	0	0	1	0
19	MF	(Germany) GER	Florian Neuhaus	15	1	4+8	0	1+1	1	1	0
21	GK	(Germany) GER	Jan Zimmermann	15	0	13	0	0	0	2	0
22	DF	(Montenegro) MNE	Filip Stojković	10	0	8	0	0	0	1+1	0
24	GK	(Germany) GER	Stefan Ortega	24	0	21	0	2	0	1	0
25	DF	(Senegal) SEN	Abdoulaye Ba	18	3	15	3	2	0	1	0
26	DF	(Germany) GER	Kilian Jakob	1	0	1	0	0	0	0	0
28	DF	(Ghana) GHA	Lumor	19	2	16	2	2	0	1	0
29	MF	(Germany) GER	Stefan Aigner	28	4	20+4	3	2	0	2	1
30	FW	(Brazil) BRA	Amilton	15	0	12+2	0	0	0	1	0
31	FW	(Brazil) BRA	Victor Andrade	9	1	1+6	1	0	0	0+2	0
33	MF	(Germany) GER	Levent Ayçiçek	27	5	16+7	5	2	0	0+2	0
35	DF	(Croatia) CRO	Marin Pongračić	7	0	6	0	1	0	0	0
38	MF	(France) FRA	Romuald Lacazette	27	1	24+1	1	1	0	1	0
40	FW	(Croatia) CRO	Ivica Olić	33	5	23+7	5	0+2	0	1	0
44	DF	(Germany) GER	Felix Weber	3	0	1	0	2	0	0	0
Players away on loan:
9	FW	(Montenegro) MNE	Stefan Mugoša	11	0	1+9	0	0	0	1	0
Players who featured but departed the club permanently during the season:
15	MF	(Slovenia) SLO	Goran Šukalo	1	0	0+1	0	0	0	0	0
20	DF	(Brazil) BRA	Rodnei	3	0	2+1	0	0	0	0	0
30	DF	(Australia) AUS	Miloš Degenek	9	0	7+1	0	0	0	1	0

=== Goal scorers ===
Place	Position	Nation	Number	Name	2. Bundesliga	Relegation play-off	DFB-Pokal	Total
1	MF	(Austria)	10	Michael Liendl	8	0	0	8
2	MF	(Germany)	33	Levent Ayçiçek	5	0	0	5
2	FW	(Croatia)	40	Ivica Olić	5	0	0	5
4	MF	(Germany)	29	Stefan Aigner	3	1	0	4
5	FW	(Germany)	13	Sascha Mölders	3	0	0	3
5	DF	(Senegal)	25	Abdoulaye Ba	3	0	0	3
7	DF	(Germany)	4	Kai Bülow	2	0	0	2
7	FW	(Denmark)	9	Christian Gytkjær	2	0	0	2
7	DF	(Ghana)	28	Lumor	2	0	0	2
10	DF	(Germany)	11	Daniel Adlung	1	0	0	1
10	DF	(Germany)	17	Felix Uduokhai	1	0	0	1
10	FW	(Brazil)	31	Victor Andrade	1	0	0	1
10	MF	(Germany)	19	Florian Neuhaus	0	1	0	1
10	FW	(Algeria)	8	Karim Matmour	0	0	1	1
Total					37	2	1	39

=== Clean sheets ===
Place	Position	Nation	Number	Name	2. Bundesliga	Relegation play-off	DFB-Pokal	Total
1	GK	(Germany)	24	Stefan Ortega	3	0	0	3
1	GK	(Germany)	21	Jan Zimmermann	2	0	1	3
Total					5	0	1	6

=== Disciplinary record ===
Number	Nation	Position	Name	2. Bundesliga		Relegation play-off		DFB-Pokal		Total	
Number	Nation	Position	Name	Booked	Sent off (straight red)	Booked	Sent off (straight red)	Booked	Sent off (straight red)	Booked	Sent off (straight red)
2	(Germany)	DF	Jan Mauersberger	8	0	0	0	1	0	9	0
3	(Germany)	DF	Maximilian Wittek	7	0	0	0	1	0	8	0
4	(Germany)	DF	Kai Bülow	5	0	0	0	0	0	5	0
5	(Kosovo)	MF	Fanol Përdedaj	5	0	0	0	3	0	8	0
6	(Poland)	DF	Sebastian Boenisch	1	1	0	0	1	0	2	1
7	(South Africa)	MF	Daylon Claasen	3	0	0	0	0	0	3	0
8	(Algeria)	FW	Karim Matmour	5	0	0	0	1	0	6	0
9	(Denmark)	FW	Christian Gytkjær	2	0	0	0	0	0	2	0
10	(Austria)	MF	Michael Liendl	2	0	0	0	0	0	2	0
11	(Germany)	MF	Daniel Adlung	7	0	0	0	1	0	8	0
12	(Brazil)	FW	Ribamar	0	0	0	0	0	1	0	1
13	(Germany)	FW	Sascha Mölders	7	0	1	0	0	0	8	0
16	(Germany)	DF	Marnon Busch	3	1	0	0	0	0	3	1
17	(Germany)	DF	Felix Uduokhai	2	0	0	0	1	0	3	0
19	(Germany)	MF	Florian Neuhaus	3	0	1	0	1	0	4	0
21	(Germany)	GK	Jan Zimmermann	2	0	0	0	0	0	2	0
22	(Montenegro)	DF	Filip Stojković	3	0	0	0	1	0	4	0
25	(Senegal)	DF	Abdoulaye Ba	6	0	1	0	1	0	7	0
28	(Ghana)	DF	Lumor	0	0	0	0	1	0	1	0
29	(Germany)	MF	Stefan Aigner	4	0	0	0	1	0	5	0
30	(Brazil)	FW	Amilton	7	0	0	0	0	0	7	0
31	(Brazil)	FW	Victor Andrade	3	0	0	0	0	0	3	0
33	(Germany)	MF	Levent Ayçiçek	1	0	1	0	0	0	2	0
35	(Croatia)	DF	Marin Pongračić	3	0	2	1	0	0	5	1
38	(France)	MF	Romuald Lacazette	4	0	1	0	0	0	5	0
40	(Croatia)	FW	Ivica Olić	2	0	0	0	0	0	2	0
Players away on loan:
Players who left 1860 Munich during the season:
20	(Brazil)	DF	Rodnei	2	0	0	0	0	0	2	0
30	(Australia)	DF	Miloš Degenek	1	0	0	0	0	0	1	0
Total				98	2	7	1	14	1	119	3
