= 2014–15 TSV 1860 Munich season =

1860 Munich
2014–15 season
- Head Coach: Ricardo Moniz (to 24 September 2014); Markus von Ahlen (from 24 September 2014 to 17 February 2015); Torsten Fröhling (from 17 February 2015)
- Stadium: Allianz Arena
- 2. Bundesliga: 16th (relegation playoff)
- Relegation playoff: Winner
- DFB-Pokal: Second round
- Top goalscorer: League: Rubin Okotie (13); All: Rubin Okotie (16)

The 2014–15 TSV 1860 Munich season happened between 4 August 2014 and 2 June 2015.

== Season review ==
=== August ===
Matchday one happened on 4 August 2014 against 1. FC Kaiserslautern. Kaiserslautern won the match 3–2. Rubin Okotie scored two goals for 1860 Munich. Kaiserslautern got two goals from Srđan Lakić, including one from the penalty mark, and a goal from Philipp Hofmann. Tobias Sippel was sent-off during the match. 1860 Munich finished matchday one in 15th place. Matchday two happened on 10 August 2014 against RB Leipzig. Leipzig won the match 3–0 with goals from Yussuf Poulsen, Matthias Morys, and Denis Thomalla. 1860 Munich finished matchday two in 17th place. On 17 August 2014, 1860 Munich faced Holstein Kiel in the first round of the German Cup. 1860 Munich won the match 2–1. Rubin Okotie scored two goals for 1860 Munich, including one from the penalty mark. Tim Siedschlag scored for Holstein Kiel. Matchday three happened on 22 August 2014 against 1. FC Heidenheim. The match finished in a 2–2 draw. Rubin Okotie and Leonardo scored for 1860 Munich. Florian Niederlechner and Sebastian Griesbeck scored for Heidenheim. Smail Morabit was sent-off during the match. 1860 Munich finished matchday three in 17th place. Matchday four happened on 31 August 2014 against SV Darmstadt 98. The match finished in a 1–1 draw. Rubin Okotie scored for 1860 Munich and Dominik Stroh-Engel scored for Darmstadt. 1860 Munich finished matchday four in 16th place.

=== September ===
Matchday five happened on 14 September 2014 against FC St. Pauli. 1860 Munich won the match 2–1. Leonardo and Yannick Stark scored for 1860 Munich. John Verhoek scored for St. Pauli. 1860 Munich finished matchday five in 11th place. Matchday six happened on 20 September 2014 against FC Ingolstadt 04. The match finished in a 1–1 draw. Rubin Okotie scored for 1860 Munich and Pascal Groß scored for Ingolstadt. 1860 Munich finished matchday six in 12th place. Matchday seven happened on 23 September 2014 against SV Sandhausen. Sandhausen won the match 1–0 with a goal from Andrew Wooten. Lukas Kübler was sent-off during the match. 1860 Munich finished matchday seven in 13th place. Matchday eight happened on 26 September 2014 against Greuther Fürth. 1860 Munich won 2–0 with goals from Rubin Okotie and Ilie Sánchez. 1860 Munich finished matchday eight in 12th place.

=== October ===
Matchday nine happened on 3 October 2014 against VfR Aalen. Aalen won 2–0 with goals from Fabian Weiß and Arne Feick. 1860 Munich finished matchday nine in 15th place. Matchday 10 happened on 19 October 2014 against Erzgebirge Aue. Erzgebirge Aue won the match 4–1. Valdet Rama scored for 1860 Munich. René Klingbeil, Arvydas Novikovas, Romario Kortzorg, and Rico Benatelli scored for Erzgebirge Aue. 1860 Munich finished matchday 10 in 17th place. Matchday 11 happened on 26 October 2014 against Eintracht Braunschweig. Eintracht Braunschweig won the match 2–1. Christopher Schindler scored for 2860 Munich. Hendrick Zuck and Raffael Korte scored for Eintracht Braunschweig. 1860 Munich finished matchday 11 in 18th place (last). 1860 Munich faced SC Freiburg in the second round of the German Cup on 29 October 2014. Valdet Rama and Rubin Okotie scored for 1860 Munich. Freiburg got three goals from Admir Mehmedi, a goal from Sebastian Freis, and a goal from Jonathan Schmid.

=== November ===
Matchday 12 happened on 2 November 2014 against VfL Bochum. 1860 Munich won 3–0 with two goals from Rubin Okotie and a goal from Daniel Adlung. 1860 Munich finished matchday 12 in 14th place. Matchday 13 happened on 10 November 2014 against Fortuna Düsseldorf. Fortuna Düsseldorf won 1–0 with a goal from Bruno Soares. 1860 Munich finished matchday 13 in 15th place. Matchday 14 happened on 22 November 2014 against Union Berlin. 1860 Munich won the match 4–1. 1860 Munich won the match 4–1. 1860 Munich got two goals from Rubin Okotie and a goal from Daniel Adlung, and a goal from Valdet Rama. Sebastian Polter scored for Union Berlin. 1860 Munich finished matchday 14 in 12th place. Matchday 15 happened on 30 November 2014 against FSV Frankfurt. Frankfurt won the match 2–0 with goals from Zlatko Dedić and Mario Engels. 1860 Munich finished matchday 15 in 15th place.

=== December to February ===
Matchday 16 happened on 8 December 2014 against 1. FC Nürnberg. Nürnberg won the match 2–1. 1860 Munich got their goal from an own goal by Jürgen Mössmer. Alessandro Schöpf and Jakub Sylvestr. Martin Angha was sent-off during the match. 1860 Munich finished matchday 16 in 16th place. Matchday 17 happened on 13 December 2014 against Karlsruher SC. Karlsruhe won the match 3–2. Maximilian Wittek and Rubin Okotie scored for 1860 Munich. Karlsruhe got two goals from Rouwen Hennings and a goal from Hiroki Yamada. 1860 Munich finished matchday 17 in 16th place. Matchday 18 happened on 17 December 2014 against Kaiserslautern. The match finished in a 1–1 draw. Yannick Stark scored for 1860 Munich and Markus Karl scored for Kaiserslautern. 1860 Munich finished matchday 18 in 16th place. Matchday 19 happened on 22 December 2014 against Leipzig. The match finished in a 1–1 draw. Rubin Okotie scored for 1860 Munich and Yussuf Poulsen scored for Leipzig. 1860 Munich finished matchday 19 in 15th place. Matchday 20 happened on 9 February 2015 against Heidenheim. Heidenheim won the match 2–1. Rubin Okotie scored for 1860 Munich. Tim Göhlert and Florian Niederlechner scored for Heidenheim. Ilie Sánchez was sent-off during the match. 1860 Munich finished matchday 20 in 16th place. Matchday 21 happened on 15 February 2015 against Darmstadt. The match finished in a 1–1 draw. Jannik Bandowski scored for 1860 Munich and Leon Balogun scored for Darmstadt. 1860 Munich finished matchday 21 in 16th place. Matchday 22 happened on 21 February 2015 against St. Pauli. 1860 Munich won the match 2–1. 1860 Munich got an own goal from Sören Gonther and a goal from Marius Wolf. Christopher Nöthe scored for St. Pauli. 1860 Munich finished matchday 22 in 15th place.

=== March ===
Matchday 23 happened on 2 March 2015 against Ingolstadt. The match finished in a 1–1 draw. Jannik Bandowski scored for 1860 Munich and Danilo scored for Ingolstadt. 1860 Munich finished matchday 23 in 15th place. Matchday 24 happened on 8 March 2015 against Sandhausen. Sandhausen won the match 3–2. Gary Kagelmacher scored two goals for 1860 Munich. Andrew Wooten, Manuel Stiefler, and Nicky Adler scored for Sandhausen. 1860 Munich finished matchday 24 in 15th place. Matchday 25 happened on 13 March 2015 against Greuther Fürth. 1860 Munich won the match 3–0 with goals from Krisztian Simon, Korbinian Vollmann, and Daniel Adlung. 1860 Munich finished matchday 25 in 15th place. Matchday 26 happened on 20 March 2015 against Aalen. The match finished in a 1–1 draw. Rodri scored for 1860 Munich and Collin Quaner scored for Aalen. 1860 Munich finished matchday 26 in 15th place.

=== April ===
Matchday 27 happened on 5 April 2015 against Erzgebirge Aue. Erzgebirge Aue won the match 1–0 with a goal from Romario Kortzorg. 1860 Munich finished matchday 28 in 15th place. Matchday 28 happened on 11 April 2015 against Eintracht Braunschweig. Eintracht Braunschweig won the match 2–0 with goals from Hendrick Zuck and Jan Hochscheidt. 1860 Munich finished matchday 28 in 15 place. Matchday 29 happened on 18 April 2015 against Bochum. 1860 Munich won the match 2–1. Marius Wolf and Stephan Hain scored for 1860 Munich. Michael Gregoritsch scored for Bochum. 1860 Munich finished matchday 29 in 15th place. Matchday 30 happened on 25 April 2015 against Fortuna Düsseldorf. The match finished in a 1–1 draw. Daniel Adlung scored for 1860 Munich and Michael Liendl scored for Bochum. 1860 Munich finished matchday 30 in 15th place.

=== May and June ===
Matchday 31 happened on 3 May 2015 against Union Berlin. Union Berlin won the match 3–0 with two goals from Sebastian Polter and a goal from Damir Kreilach. 1860 Munich finished matchday 31 in 17th place. Matchday 32 happened on 8 May 2015 against Frankfurt. 1860 Munich won the match 1–0 with a goal from Valdet Rama. 1860 Munich finished matchday 32 in 17th place. Matchday 33 happened on 17 May 2015 against Nürnberg. 1860 Munich won the match 2–1. Yannick Stark and Daniel Adlung scored for 1860 Munich. Guillermo Vallori scored for Nürnberg. Javier Pinola was sent-off during the match. 1860 Munich finished matchday 33 in 15th place. Matchday 34 happened on 24 May 2015 against Karlsruhe. Karlsruhe won the match 2–0 with an own goal from Kai Bülow and a goal from Manuel Torres. 1860 Munich finished the season in 16th place. 1860 Munich qualified for the relegation playoff. The first leg was played on 29 May 2015 and the second leg was played on 2 June 2015. The opponent was Holstein Kiel. The first leg finished in a 0–0 draw. 1860 Munich won the second leg 2–1. Daniel Adlung and Kai Bülow scored for 1860 Munich. Rafael Kazior scored for Holstein Kiel. With the win, 1860 Munich retained their status as a second division club.

== Competitive results ==
=== Bundesliga ===
==== League ====
===== Results summary =====
Overall								Home						Away					
Pld	W	D	L	GF	GA	GD	Pts	W	D	L	GF	GA	GD	W	D	L	GF	GA	GD
34	9	9	16	41	51	−10	36	4	4	9	18	27	−9	5	5	7	23	24	−1

Last updated: 17 March 2018.
Source: kicker.de

===== Results =====
MD	Date	H/A	Opponent	Res. F–A	Goalscorers		Table		Ref.
MD	Date	H/A	Opponent	Res. F–A	1860 Munich	Opponent	Pos.	Pts.	Ref.
1	4 Aug	A	Kaiserslautern	2–3	Okotie 26', 33'	Lakić 68' (pen.), 71'; Hofmann 80'	15	0	
2	10 Aug	H	Leipzig	0–3	—	Poulsen 39'; Morys 68'; Thomalla 82'	17	0	
3	22 Aug	A	Heidenheim	2–2	Okotie 13'; Leonardo 66'	Niederlechner 51'; Griesbeck 55'	17	1	
4	31 Aug	H	Darmstadt	1–1	Okotie 54'	Stroh-Engel 31'	16	2	
5	14 Sep	A	St. Pauli	2–1	Leonardo 21' (pen.); Stark 45+1'	Verhoek 31'	11	5	
6	20 Sep	H	Ingolstadt	1–1	Okotie 20'	Groß 16'	12	6	
7	23 Sep	A	Sandhausen	0–1	—	Wooten 90+2'	13	6	
8	26 Sep	H	Greuther Fürth	2–0	Okotie 6'; Sánchez 74'	—	12	9	
9	3 Oct	A	Aalen	0–2	—	Weiß 83'; Feick 85'	15	9	
10	19 Oct	A	Erzgebirge Aue	1–4	Rama 51'	Klingbeil 2'; Novikovas 8'; Kortzorg 15'; Benatelli 74'	17	9	
11	26 Oct	H	Eintracht Braunschweig	1–2	Schindler 38'	Zuck 18'; Korte 49'	18	9	
12	2 Nov	A	Bochum	3–0	Okotie 62', 74'; Adlung 87'	—	14	12	
13	10 Nov	H	Fortuna Düsseldorf	0–1	—	Soares 4'	15	12	
14	22 Nov	A	Union Berlin	4–1	Adlung 9'; Okotie 39', 46'; Rama 49'	Polter 51'	12	15	
15	30 Nov	H	Frankfurt	0–2	—	Dedić 44'; Engels 89'	15	15	
16	8 Dec	A	Nürnberg	1–2	Mössmer 28' (o.g.)	Schöpf 14'; Sylvestr 17'	16	15	
17	13 Dec	H	Karlsruhe	2–3	Wittek 28'; Okotie 74'	Hennings 59', 69'; Yamada 67'	16	15	
18	17 Dec	H	Kaiserslautern	1–1	Stark 26'	Karl 85'	16	16	
19	22 Dec	A	Leipzig	1–1	Okotie 86'	Poulsen 29'	15	17	
20	9 Feb	H	Heidenheim	1–2	Okotie 29' (pen.)	Göhlert 54'; Niederlechner 66'	16	17	
21	15 Feb	A	Darmstadt	1–1	Bandowski 26'	Balogun 83'	16	18	
22	21 Feb	H	St. Pauli	2–1	Gonther 10' (o.g.); Wolf 72'	Nöthe 77'	15	21	
23	2 Mar	A	Ingolstadt	1–1	Bandowski 83'	Danilo 41'	15	22	
24	8 Mar	H	Sandhausen	2–3	Kagelmacher 33', 90+1'	Wooten 7'; Stiefler 47'; Adler 52'	15	22	
25	13 Mar	A	Greuther Fürth	3–0	Simon 34'; Adlung 71'	—	15	25	
26	20 Mar	H	Aalen	1–1	Rodri 75'	Quaner 59'	15	26	
27	5 Apr	H	Erzgebirge Aue	0–1	—	Kortzorg 5'	15	26	
28	11 Apr	A	Eintracht Braunschweig	0–2	—	Zuck 5'; Hochscheidt 47'	15	26	
29	18 Apr	H	Bochum	2–1	Wolf 56'; Hain 90+2'	Gregoritsch 16'	15	29	
30	25 Apr	A	Fortuna Düsseldorf	1–1	Adlung 42'	Liendl 48'	15	30	
31	3 May	H	Union Berlin	0–3	—	Polter 19', 89'; Kreilach 80'	17	30	
32	8 May	A	Frankfurt	1–0	Rama 84'	—	17	33	
33	17 May	H	Nürnberg	2–1	Stark 45'	Adlung 72' (pen.)	15	36	
34	24 May	A	Karlsruhe	0–2	—	Bülow 9' (o.g.); Torres 69'	16	36	

==== Relegation playoff ====
Leg	Date	H/A	Opponent	Res. F–A	Agg. score F–A	Goalscorers		Ref.
Leg	Date	H/A	Opponent	Res. F–A	Agg. score F–A	1860 Munich	Opponent	Ref.
Relegation playoff
1	29 May	A	Holstein Kiel	0–0	—	—	—	
2	2 Jun	H	Holstein Kiel	2–1	2–1	Adlung 78'; Bülow 90+1'	Kazior 16'	

=== DFB-Pokal ===
Rd	Date	H/A	Opponent	Res. F–A	Goalscorers		Ref.
Rd	Date	H/A	Opponent	Res. F–A	1860 Munich	Opponent	Ref.
1	17 Aug	A	Holstein Kiel	2–1	Okotie 65', 81' (pen.)	Siedschlag 8'	
2	29 Oct	H	Freiburg	2–5	Rama 16'; Okotie 69'	Freis 25'; Mehmedi 59', 64', 89'; Schmid 84'	

== Squad statistics ==
=== Matches played and goals scored ===
No.	Pos	Nat	Player	Total		2. Bundesliga		Relegation playoff		DFB-Pokal	
No.	Pos	Nat	Player	Apps	Goals	Apps	Goals	Apps	Goals	Apps	Goals
	GK	(Germany) GER	Vitus Eicher	15	0	13	0	2	0	0	0
	GK	(Hungary) HUN	Gábor Király	2	0	2	0	0	0	0	0
	GK	(Germany) GER	Stefan Ortega	22	0	20	0	0	0	2	0
	DF	(Switzerland) SUI	Martin Angha	18	0	16	0	0	0	2	0
	DF	(Germany) GER	Jannik Bandowski	16	2	14	2	2	0	0	0
	DF	(Germany) GER	Kai Bülow	19	1	15	0	2	1	2	0
	DF	(Germany) GER	Sebastian Hertner	12	0	11	0	0	0	1	0
	DF	(Germany) GER	Gary Kagelmacher	29	2	26	2	2	0	1	0
	DF	(Slovakia) SVK	Vladimir Kovac	1	0	1	0	0	0	0	0
	DF	(Germany) GER	Christopher Schindler	33	1	29	1	2	0	2	0
	DF	(Germany) GER	Markus Steinhöfer	16	3	15	3	0	0	1	0
	DF	(Spain) ESP	Guillermo Vallori	21	1	21	1	0	0	0	0
	DF	(Germany) GER	Moritz Volz	3	0	2	0	0	0	1	0
	DF	(Germany) GER	Maximilian Wittek	22	1	20	1	2	0	0	0
	DF	(Poland) POL	Grzegorz Wojtkowiak	9	0	9	0	0	0	0	0
	MF	(Germany) GER	Daniel Adlung	34	6	31	5	2	1	1	0
	MF	(Ghana) GHA	Anthony Annan	3	0	3	0	0	0	0	0
	MF	(Spain) ESP	Edu Bedia	10	0	9	0	0	0	1	0
	MF	(South Africa) RSA	Daylon Claasen	15	0	13	0	0	0	2	0
	MF	(Albania) ALB	Valdet Rama	29	4	26	3	2	0	1	1
	MF	(Spain) ESP	Ilie Sánchez	26	1	24	1	0	0	2	0
	MF	(Germany) GER	Dominik Stahl	12	0	10	0	2	0	0	0
	MF	(Germany) GER	Yannick Stark	17	2	16	2	0	0	1	0
	MF	(Croatia) CRO	Marin Tomasov	12	0	10	0	0	0	2	0
	MF	(Germany) GER	Korbinian Vollmann	20	1	18	1	2	0	0	0
	MF	(Germany) GER	Julian Weigl	26	0	24	0	1	0	1	0
	MF	(Germany) GER	Marius Wolf	26	2	23	2	2	0	1	0
	FW	(Germany) GER	Stephan Hain	10	1	8	1	2	0	0	0
	FW	(Brazil) BRA	Leonardo	9	2	8	2	0	0	1	0
	FW	(Serbia) SRB	Fejsal Mulić	6	0	6	0	0	0	0	0
	FW	(Austria) AUT	Rubin Okotie	29	16	25	13	2	0	2	3
	FW	(Spain) ESP	Rodri	12	1	12	1	0	0	0	0
	FW	(Hungary) HUN	Krisztián Simon	9	1	8	1	1	0	0	0
	FW	(United States) USA	Bobby Wood	16	3	15	3	0	0	1	0

=== Bookings ===
Player	Total			Bundesliga			Relegation playoff			DFB-Pokal			Ref.
Player	Booked	(yellow card) (red card)	Sent off (straight red)	Booked	(yellow card) (red card)	Sent off (straight red)	Booked	(yellow card) (red card)	Sent off (straight red)	Booked	(yellow card) (red card)	Sent off (straight red)	Ref.
Vitus Eicher	1	0	0	1	0	0	0	0	0	0	0	0	
Gábor Király	1	0	0	1	0	0	0	0	0	0	0	0	
Stefan Ortega	3	0	0	2	0	0	1	0	0	0	0	0	
Martin Angha	4	1	0	3	1	0	0	0	0	1	0	0	
Jannik Bandowski	2	0	0	2	0	0	0	0	0	0	0	0	
Kai Bülow	6	0	0	5	0	0	0	0	1	0	0	0	
Sebastian Hertner	3	0	0	3	0	0	0	0	0	0	0	0	
Gary Kagelmacher	6	0	0	5	0	0	0	0	0	1	0	0	
Vladimir Kovac	0	0	0	0	0	0	0	0	0	0	0	0	
Christopher Schindler	5	0	0	4	0	0	0	0	0	1	0	0	
Markus Steinhöfer	2	0	0	1	0	0	0	0	0	1	0	0	
Guillermo Vallori	4	0	0	4	0	0	0	0	0	0	0	0	
Moritz Volz	2	0	0	1	0	0	0	0	0	1	0	0	
Maximilian Wittek	3	0	0	2	0	0	1	0	0	0	0	0	
Grzegorz Wojtkowiak	2	0	0	2	0	0	0	0	0	0	0	0	
Daniel Adlung	4	0	0	4	0	0	0	0	0	0	0	0	
Anthony Annan	0	0	0	0	0	0	0	0	0	0	0	0	
Edu Bedia	0	0	0	0	0	0	0	0	0	0	0	0	
Daylon Claasen	3	0	0	1	0	0	0	0	0	2	0	0	
Valdet Rama	5	0	0	5	0	0	0	0	0	0	0	0	
Ilie Sánchez	9	1	0	8	1	0	0	0	0	1	0	0	
Dominik Stahl	1	0	0	0	0	0	1	0	0	0	0	0	
Yannick Stark	5	0	0	5	0	0	0	0	0	0	0	0	
Marin Tomasov	1	0	0	1	0	0	0	0	0	0	0	0	
Korbinian Vollmann	1	0	0	1	0	0	0	0	0	0	0	0	
Julian Weigl	8	0	0	6	0	0	1	0	0	1	0	0	
Marius Wolf	3	0	0	3	0	0	0	0	0	0	0	0	
Stephan Hain	1	0	0	1	0	0	0	0	0	0	0	0	
Leonardo	1	0	0	1	0	0	0	0	0	0	0	0	
Fejsal Mulić	2	0	0	2	0	0	0	0	0	0	0	0	
Rubin Okotie	6	0	0	5	0	0	1	0	0	0	0	0	
Rodri	3	0	0	3	0	0	0	0	0	0	0	0	
Krisztián Simon	0	0	0	0	0	0	0	0	0	0	0	0	
Bobby Wood	2	0	0	2	0	0	0	0	0	0	0	0	
Totals	99	2	0	84	2	0	5	0	0	9	0	0	—
