= Kai Bülow =

German footballer

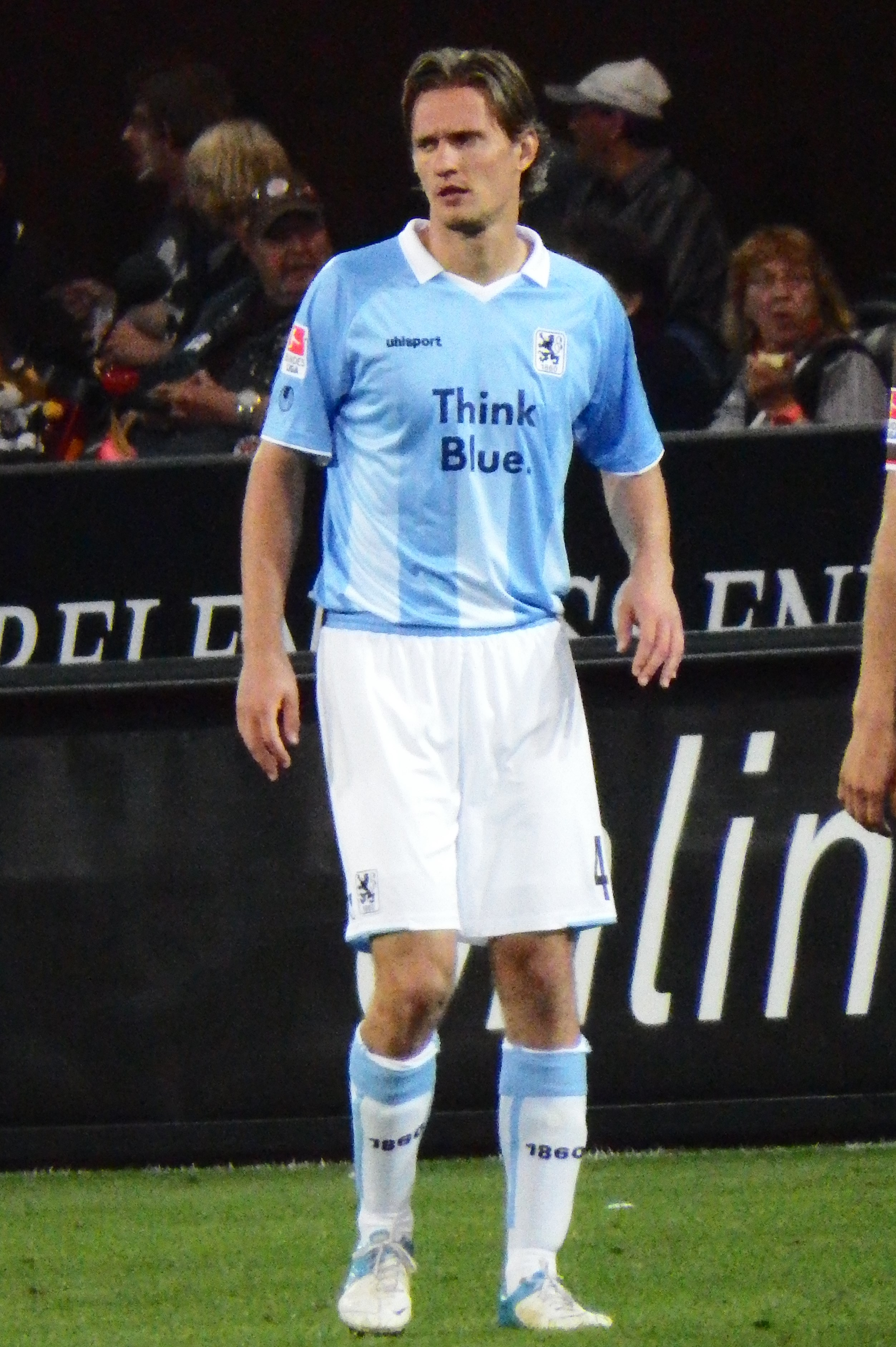
- Bülow playing for 1860 Munich in 2013

Personal information
- Date of birth: 31 May 1986 (age 40)
- Place of birth: Rostock, East Germany
- Height: 1.88 m (6 ft 2 in)
- Position: Defender

Youth career
- –1995: FSV Bentwisch
- 1995–2005: Hansa Rostock

Senior career*
Years	Team	Apps	(Gls)
2005–2009	Hansa Rostock II	7	(1)
2005–2010	Hansa Rostock	130	(8)
2010–2017	1860 Munich	171	(13)
2016	1860 Munich II	2	(0)
2017–2018	Karlsruher SC	21	(2)
2017	Karlsruher SC II	1	(0)
2018–2020	Hansa Rostock	50	(4)
Total		382	(28)

International career
2004	Germany U19	2	(0)
2006–2007	Germany U21	5	(0)
- * Club domestic league appearances and goals

Kai Bülow (born 31 May 1986) is a German former professional footballer who most recently played as a defender for Hansa Rostock.

== Career ==
In July 2018, Bülow returned to former club Hansa Rostock signing a two-year contract.

In June 2020, Bülow announced he would retire from playing at the end of the 2019–20 season.

== Personal life ==
Growing up his favourite team was VfB Stuttgart and his favourite player was Patrick Vieira. He stated that he would love to play for Arsenal some day.

== Career statistics ==
Appearances and goals by club, season and competition
Club	Season	League			Cup		Other		Total	
Club	Season	Division	Apps	Goals	Apps	Goals	Apps	Goals	Apps	Goals
Hansa Rostock	2005–06	2. Bundesliga	25	2	2	0	—		27	2
Hansa Rostock	2006–07	2. Bundesliga	24	1	1	0	—		25	1
Hansa Rostock	2007–08	Bundesliga	29	2	1	0	—		30	2
Hansa Rostock	2008–09	2. Bundesliga	26	0	2	0	—		28	0
Hansa Rostock	2009–10	2. Bundesliga	26	3	1	0	1 (Note: Appearances in the Relegation Playoff.)	0	28	3
Hansa Rostock	Total		130	8	7	0	1	0	138	8
Hansa Rostock II	2005–06	Regionalliga Nord	0	0	1	0	—		1	0
Hansa Rostock II	2008–09	Regionalliga Nord	1	0	—		—		1	0
Hansa Rostock II	Total		1	0	1	0	0	0	2	0
1860 Munich	2010–11	2. Bundesliga	29	3	2	0	—		31	3
1860 Munich	2011–12	2. Bundesliga	28	1	2	0	—		30	1
1860 Munich	2012–13	2. Bundesliga	31	1	3	1	—		34	2
1860 Munich	2013–14	2. Bundesliga	25	3	2	0	—		27	3
1860 Munich	2014–15	2. Bundesliga	15	0	2	0	2	1	19	1
1860 Munich	2015–16	2. Bundesliga	22	3	1	0	—		23	3
1860 Munich	2016–17	2. Bundesliga	21	2	1	0	1	0	23	2
1860 Munich	Total		171	13	13	1	3	1	187	15
1860 Munich II	2016–17	Regionalliga Bayern	2	0	—		—		2	0
Karlsruher SC	2017–18	3. Liga	21	2	1	0	—		22	2
Karlsruher SC II	2017–18	Oberliga Baden-Württemberg	1	0	—		—		1	0
Hansa Rostock	2018–19	3. Liga	27	3	2	0	—		29	3
Hansa Rostock	2019–20	3. Liga	23	1	0	0	—		23	1
Hansa Rostock	Total		50	4	2	0	0	0	52	3
Career total			376	27	24	1	4	1	404	29
