= Jan Mauersberger =

German footballer

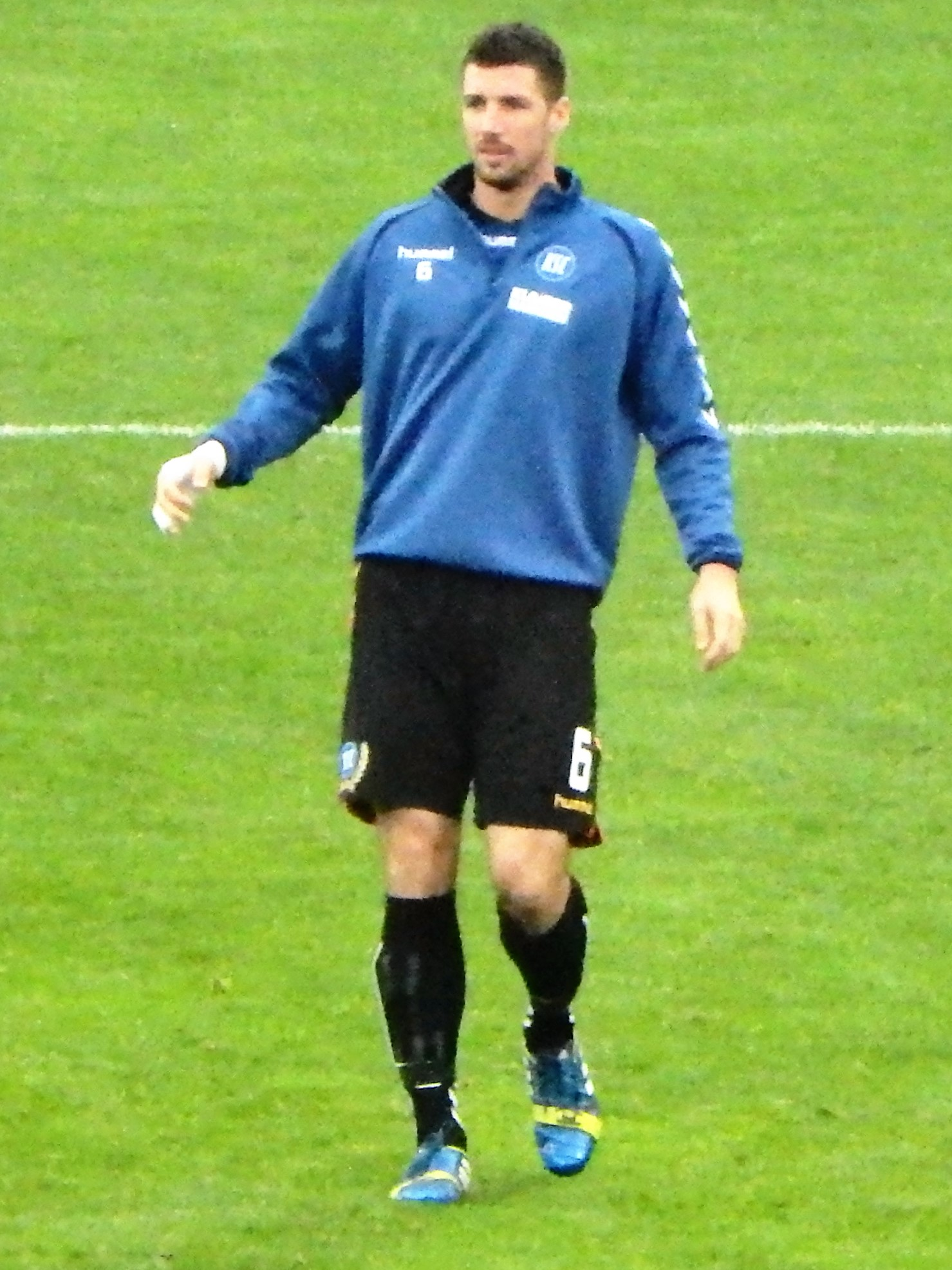
- Mauersberger, Jan KSC

Personal information
- Date of birth: 17 June 1985 (age 41)
- Place of birth: Munich, West Germany
- Height: 1.93 m (6 ft 4 in)
- Position: Centre back

Youth career
- 1993–1994: TSV Großhadern
- 1994–2003: Bayern Munich

Senior career*
Years	Team	Apps	(Gls)
2003–2006	Bayern Munich II	57	(0)
2006–2011	Greuther Fürth	78	(2)
2011–2012	VfL Osnabrück	48	(3)
2012–2016	Karlsruher SC	93	(6)
2016–2019	1860 Munich	76	(7)

International career
2004–2005	Germany U-20	3	(0)
- * Club domestic league appearances and goals

Jan Mauersberger (born 17 June 1985) is a retired German footballer who played as a defender.

Mauersberger retired at the end of the 2018/19 season.

== Career statistics ==
As of 27 March 2017.

Club	Season	League			Cup		Other		Total	
Club	Season	League	Apps	Goals	Apps	Goals	Apps	Goals	Apps	Goals
Bayern Munich II	2003–04	Regionalliga Süd	9	0	—		—		9	0
Bayern Munich II	2004–05	Regionalliga Süd	30	0	4	0	—		34	0
Bayern Munich II	2005–06	Regionalliga Süd	18	0	—		—		18	0
Bayern Munich II	Totals		57	0	4	0	—		61	0
Greuther Fürth	2006–07	2. Bundesliga	7	0	0	0	—		7	0
Greuther Fürth	2007–08	2. Bundesliga	22	0	0	0	—		22	0
Greuther Fürth	2008–09	2. Bundesliga	26	0	0	0	—		26	0
Greuther Fürth	2009–10	2. Bundesliga	20	2	3	0	—		23	2
Greuther Fürth	2010–11	2. Bundesliga	3	0	1	0	—		4	0
Greuther Fürth	Totals		78	2	4	0	—		82	2
Osnabrück	2010–11	2. Bundesliga	16	0	0	0	2	1	18	1
Osnabrück	2011–12	3. Liga	22	3	1	1	—		23	4
Osnabrück	Totals		38	3	1	1	2	1	41	5
Karlsruhe	2012–13	3. Liga	38	5	2	0	—		40	5
Karlsruhe	2013–14	2. Bundesliga	32	1	1	0	—		33	1
Karlsruhe	2014–15	2. Bundesliga	11	0	1	1	—		12	1
Karlsruhe	2015–16	2. Bundesliga	12	0	0	0	—		12	0
Karlsruhe	Totals		93	6	4	1	—		97	7
Karlsruhe II	2015–16	Oberliga Baden-Württemberg	2	1	—		—		2	1
1860 Munich	2015–16	2. Bundesliga	14	2	0	0	—		14	2
1860 Munich	2016–17	2. Bundesliga	16	0	3	0	—		19	0
1860 Munich	Totals		30	2	3	0	—		33	2
Career totals			298	14	16	2	2	1	316	17
