= Stefan Ortega =

German footballer (born 1992)

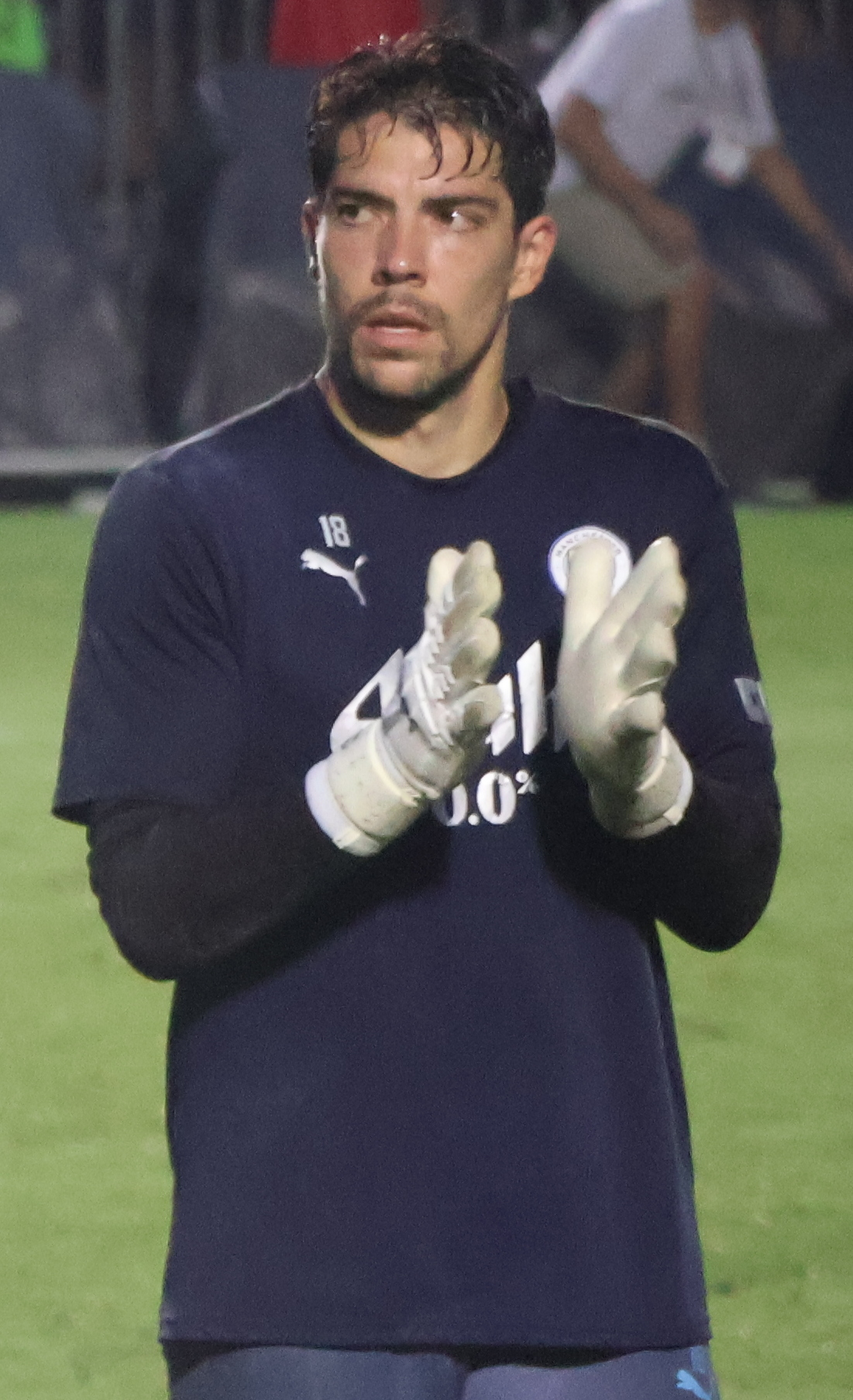
- Ortega with Manchester City in 2024

Personal information
- Full name: Stefan Ortega Moreno
- Date of birth: 6 November 1992 (age 34)
- Place of birth: Hofgeismar, Germany
- Height: 1.85 m (6 ft 1 in)
- Position: Goalkeeper

Team information
- Current team: Olympiacos
- Number: 1

Youth career
- TSV Jahn Calden
- KSV Baunatal
- Hessen Kassel
- 2007–2011: Arminia Bielefeld

Senior career*
Years	Team	Apps	(Gls)
2010–2011	Arminia Bielefeld II	6	(0)
2011–2014	Arminia Bielefeld	36	(0)
2014–2017	1860 Munich	56	(0)
2016	1860 Munich II	2	(0)
2017–2022	Arminia Bielefeld	166	(0)
2022–2026	Manchester City	25	(0)
2026	Nottingham Forest	3	(0)
2026–	Olympiacos	11	(0)
- * Club domestic league appearances and goals as of 20:52, 22 November 2026 (UTC)

Stefan Ortega Moreno (born 6 November 1992) is a German professional footballer who plays as a goalkeeper for Super League Greece club Olympiacos.

== Early life ==
Stefan Ortega Moreno was born on 6 November 1992 in Hofgeismar, Hesse. His father is Spanish and his mother is German.

== Club career ==
=== Germany ===
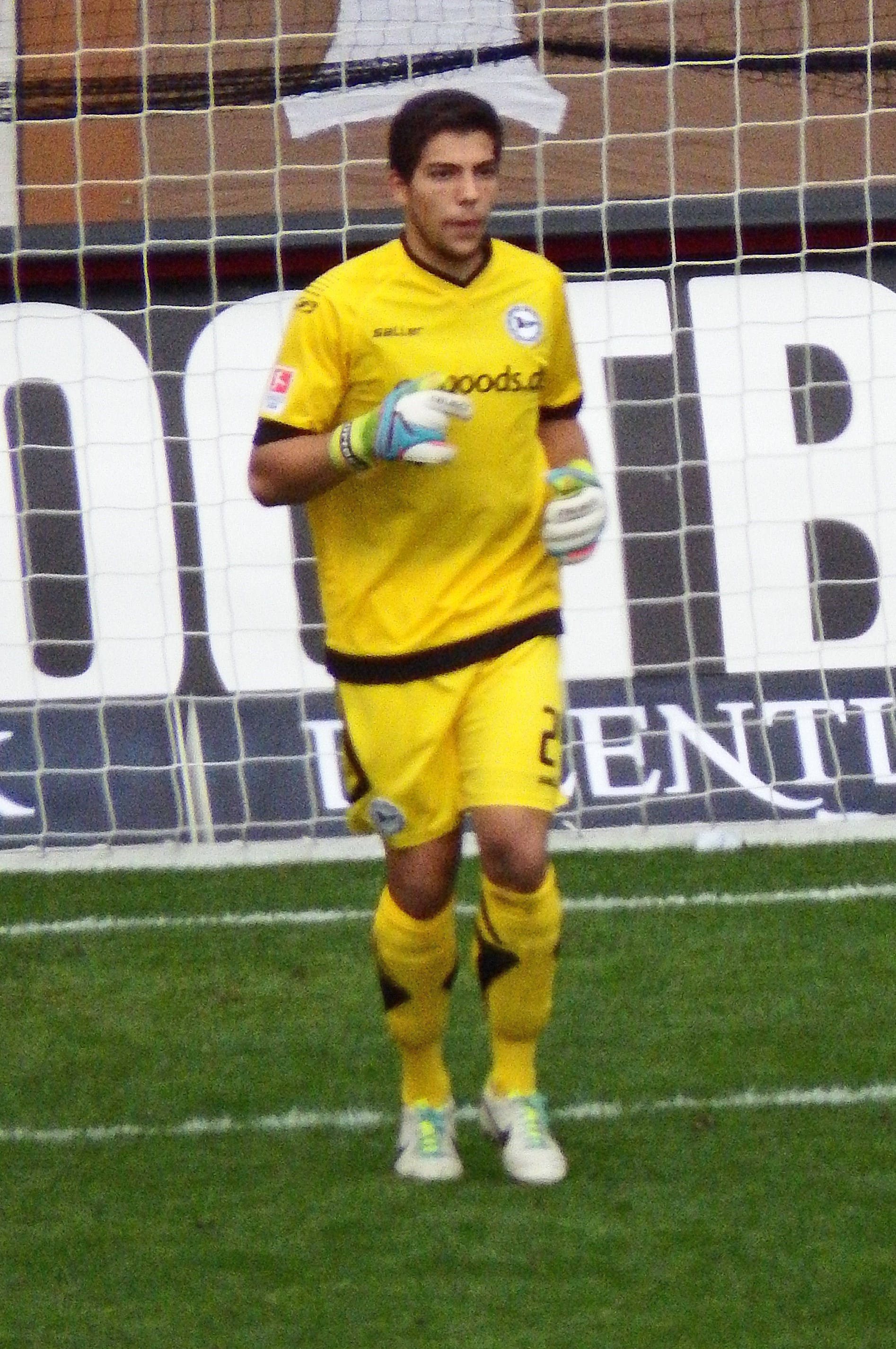
Ortega playing for Arminia Bielefeld in 2013

Ortega began his career at the north Hessian club TSV Jahn Calden before transferring to KSV Baunatal, then to KSV Hessen Kassel. In 2007, he transferred to Arminia Bielefeld and became a part of their youth setup. In the 2010–11 Season he had six appearances for the B team competing in the Regionalliga West. One year later the first team called him, and he made his senior debut for Arminia on 1 October 2011 against 1. FC Heidenheim replacing the injured Patrick Platins. After a poor performance against rivals Preußen Münster, Ortega lost his place to the Platins, instead appearing primarily in the regional Westfalenpokal. Nevertheless, Ortega was part of the Arminia squad that achieved promotion to the 2. Bundesliga at the end of the 2012–13 season, subsequently agreeing to a two-year contract extension.

In June 2014, Ortega joined 1860 Munich on a free transfer. He made his Münchner Lions debut in the 1st round of the 2014–15 DFB-Pokal, winning 2–1 over Holstein Kiel. After Gábor Király departed in August 2014, Ortega established himself as first-choice goalkeeper.

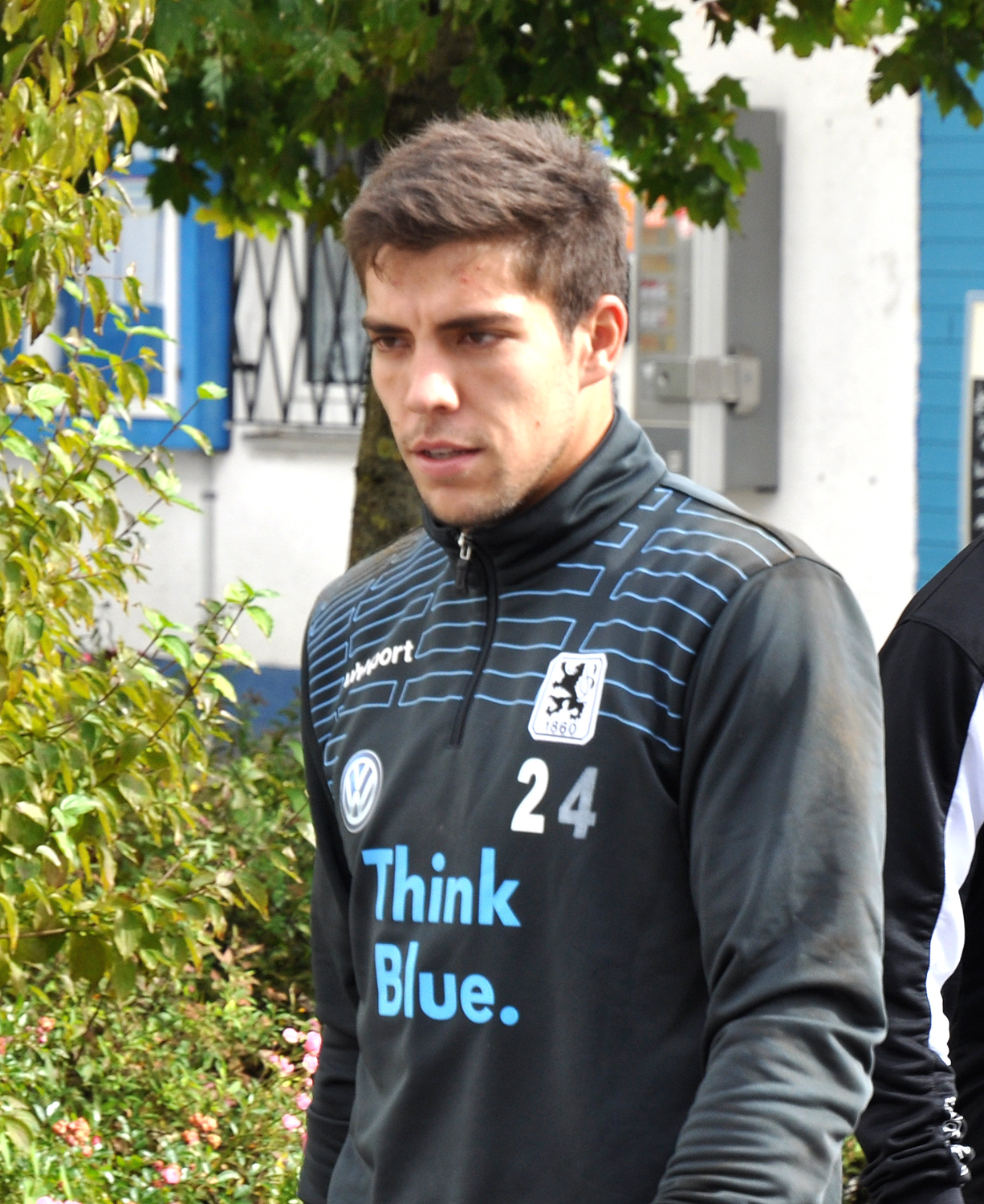
Ortega with 1860 Munich in 2014

1860 Munich were relegated at the end of the 2016–17 season; Ortega left the club, transferring back to Arminia on a three-year contract, succeeding the outgoing Wolfgang Hesl.

In January 2020, Ortega extended his contract until June 2022 following transfer interest from Bundesliga club Bayer 04 Leverkusen. With Arminia Bielefeld, Ortega was promoted to the Bundesliga in 2020. At his first season in the Bundesliga, the club secured 15th-place finish and avoided relegation after a 2–0 win in the away match against VfB Stuttgart on the final matchday. The German football magazine Kicker rated Ortega as the second best goalkeeper in the league. Arminia Bielefeld were relegated from the Bundesliga the following season.

=== Manchester City ===
In July 2022, Ortega signed with Premier League champions Manchester City on a free transfer. He started the season on the bench for City's 1–3 defeat to Liverpool in the FA Community Shield on 30 July. Ortega made his professional debut for the club in a UEFA Champions League group stage match against Borussia Dortmund, which finished 0–0. He also played the next Champions League group stage game against Sevilla, a 3–1 win, and in the third round of the EFL Cup against Chelsea, making crucial saves in a 2–0 victory for City on 9 November at the Etihad Stadium. On 3 May, Ortega made his Premier League debut, starting in a 3–0 win over West Ham United. He then went on to keep another clean sheet in Manchester City's final home league game against Chelsea again on 21 May, which finished 1–0. Ortega also played every match in City's victorious 2022–23 FA Cup campaign and was an important player in the team that won the trophy, conceding just one goal in six matches.

On 14 May 2024, Ortega replaced the injured Ederson in the second half and made crucial saves, including a one-on-one chance from Son Heung-min in the 85th minute, securing a 2–0 away victory for his club against Tottenham Hotspur in their penultimate league match, and keeping them at the top of the table for the 2023–24 season. He was named man of the match. Coach Pep Guardiola said that without Ortega's save "Arsenal are champions", and described him as "one of the best keepers I've seen in my life." Ortega started on the final day as Manchester City beat West Ham and became Premier League champions.

=== Nottingham Forest ===
On 1 February 2026, Ortega signed for Nottingham Forest until June 2026. Five days later, Ortega made his debut in a 3–1 loss to Leeds United. On 10 June 2026, the club said it was releasing the player.

== International career ==
In autumn 2010, Ortega was called up to the German U19 national team, but remained an unused substitute. On 21 May 2021, he was nominated as a potential reserve for the Germany national team for UEFA Euro 2020. His call-up for the squad was contingent if Manuel Neuer, Bernd Leno or Kevin Trapp had to withdraw due to injury. In November 2024 and March 2025, he was called up to the senior team.

== Career statistics ==
As of match played 16 September 2026

Appearances and goals by club, season and competition
Club	Season	League			National cup (Note: Includes DFB-Pokal, FA Cup)		League cup (Note: Includes EFL Cup)		Europe		Other		Total	
Club	Season	Division	Apps	Goals	Apps	Goals	Apps	Goals	Apps	Goals	Apps	Goals	Apps	Goals
Arminia Bielefeld II	2010–11	Regionalliga West	6	0	—		—		—		—		6	0
Arminia Bielefeld	2011–12	3. Liga	20	0	0	0	—		—		—		20	0
Arminia Bielefeld	2012–13	3. Liga	1	0	0	0	—		—		—		1	0
Arminia Bielefeld	2013–14	2. Bundesliga	15	0	1	0	—		—		2 (Note: Appearances in 2. Bundesliga promotion play-offs)	0	18	0
Arminia Bielefeld	Total		36	0	1	0	—		—		2	0	39	0
1860 Munich	2014–15	2. Bundesliga	20	0	2	0	—		—		—		22	0
1860 Munich	2015–16	2. Bundesliga	15	0	3	0	—		—		—		18	0
1860 Munich	2016–17	2. Bundesliga	21	0	1	0	—		—		2	0	24	0
1860 Munich	Total		56	0	6	0	—		—		2	0	64	0
1860 Munich II	2016–17	Regionalliga Bayern	2	0	—		—		—		—		2	0
Arminia Bielefeld	2017–18	2. Bundesliga	34	0	1	0	—		—		—		35	0
Arminia Bielefeld	2018–19	2. Bundesliga	31	0	0	0	—		—		—		31	0
Arminia Bielefeld	2019–20	2. Bundesliga	34	0	2	0	—		—		—		36	0
Arminia Bielefeld	2020–21	Bundesliga	34	0	1	0	—		—		—		35	0
Arminia Bielefeld	2021–22	Bundesliga	33	0	2	0	—		—		—		35	0
Arminia Bielefeld	Total		166	0	6	0	—		—		—		172	0
Manchester City	2022–23	Premier League	3	0	6	0	3	0	2 (Note: Appearances in UEFA Champions League)	0	0	0	14	0
Manchester City	2023–24	Premier League	9	0	6	0	1	0	3	0	1 (Note: Appearance in FA Community Shield)	0	20	0
Manchester City	2024–25	Premier League	13	0	4	0	2	0	2	0	1 (Note: Appearance in FIFA Club World Cup)	0	22	0
Manchester City	2025–26	Premier League	0	0	0	0	0	0	0	0	—		0	0
Manchester City	Total		25	0	16	0	6	0	7	0	2	0	56	0
Nottingham Forest	2025–26	Premier League	3	0	—		—		7 (Note: Appearances in UEFA Europa League)	0	—		10	0
Olympiacos	2026–27	Super League Greece	4	0	0	0	—		1	0	—		5	0
Career total			298	0	29	0	6	0	15	0	6	0	354	0

== Honours ==
Arminia Bielefeld

- 2. Bundesliga: 2019–20

Manchester City

- Premier League: 2022–23, 2023–24
- FA Cup: 2022–23; runner-up: 2023–24, 2024–25
- FA Community Shield: 2024
- UEFA Champions League: 2022–23
- UEFA Super Cup: 2023
- FIFA Club World Cup: 2023
