= Tim Göhlert =

German footballer

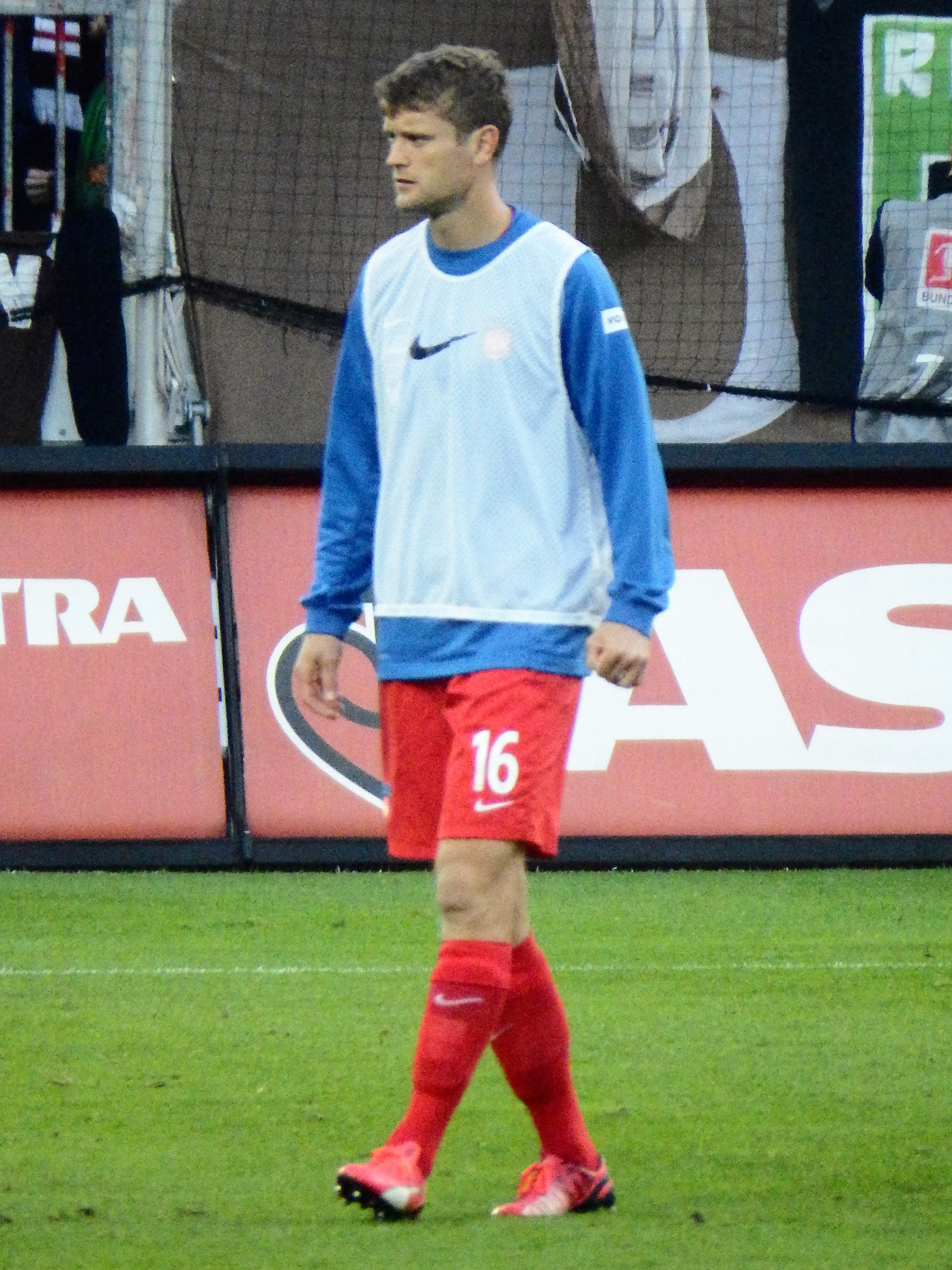
- Göhlert with Heidenheim in 2015

Personal information
- Date of birth: 15 September 1984 (age 42)
- Place of birth: Karl-Marx-Stadt, East Germany
- Height: 1.90 m (6 ft 3 in)
- Position: Centre-back

Team information
- Current team: TSG Söflingen
- Number: 16

Youth career
- –2003: VfB Fortuna Chemnitz

Senior career*
Years	Team	Apps	(Gls)
2002–2003	Fortuna Chemnitz	16	(0)
2003–2005	SSV Ulm	27	(2)
2005–2016	1. FC Heidenheim	298	(36)
2016–2018	SSV Ulm	22	(4)
2018–	TSG Söflingen	8	(2)
Total		371	(44)
- * Club domestic league appearances and goals

Tim Göhlert (15 September 1984) is a German professional footballer who plays as a centre-back for TSG Söflingen.
