= Fanol Përdedaj =

Kosovan footballer (born 1991)

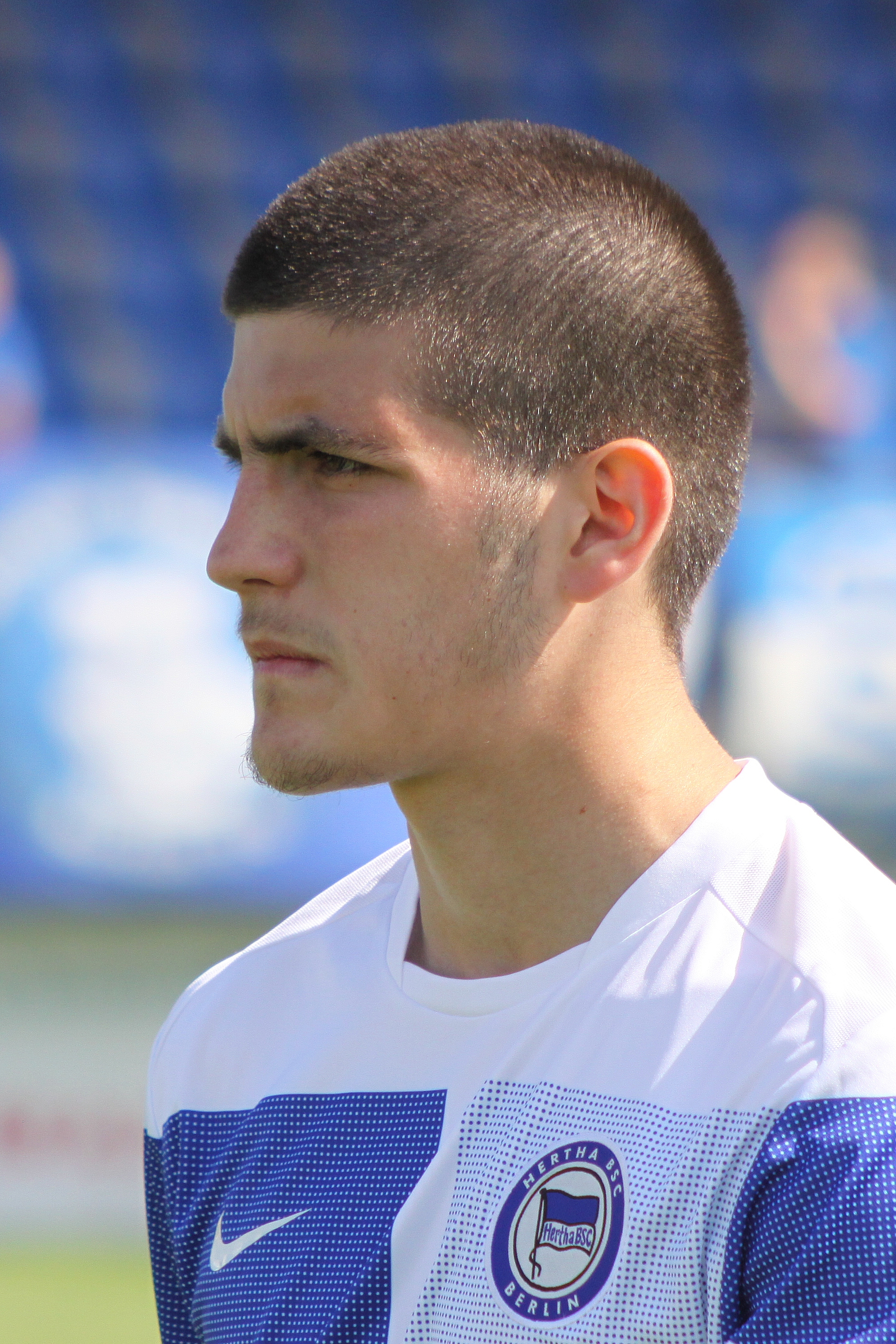
- Përdedaj with Hertha BSC in 2011.

Personal information
- Full name: Fanol Përdedaj
- Date of birth: 16 July 1991 (age 35)
- Place of birth: Gjakova, SFR Yugoslavia
- Height: 1.73 m (5 ft 8 in)
- Position: Defensive midfielder

Team information
- Current team: FC 08 Homburg
- Number: 17

Youth career
- TSV Lichtenberg
- –2002: 1. FC Wilmersdorf
- 2002–2009: Hertha BSC

Senior career*
Years	Team	Apps	(Gls)
2009–2013	Hertha BSC II	51	(3)
2009–2013	Hertha BSC	25	(0)
2012–2013	→ Lyngby (loan)	22	(0)
2014–2015	Energie Cottbus	48	(0)
2015–2016	FSV Frankfurt	30	(3)
2016–2017	1860 Munich	14	(0)
2018–2021	1. FC Saarbrücken	80	(13)
2021–2022	Würzburger Kickers	27	(0)
2022–	FC 08 Homburg	40	(7)

International career
2009–2010	Germany U19	5	(0)
2010–2014	Germany U21	1	(0)
2014–2017	Kosovo	11	(0)
- * Club domestic league appearances and goals as of 16:53, 22 April 2024 (UTC)

Fanol Përdedaj (born 16 July 1991) is a professional footballer who plays as a defensive midfielder for Regionalliga Südwest club FC 08 Homburg. He represented the Kosovo national team and previously played for Germany national under-21 football team.

== Youth career ==
Përdedaj moved to Germany after his birth and began his career for TSV Lichtenberg, and later he came to 1. FC Wilmersdorf. In July 2002, he transferred to the junior section of Hertha BSC.

== Club career ==
In the 2009–10 pre-season, he was called to the professional squad by his coach Lucien Favre. However, he was only used for the second team in the Regionalliga Nord and he was on the bench repeatedly for the first team.

Due to the injuries of Fabian Lustenberger and Pál Dárdai, Perdedaj debuted for the first team on 14 August 2010 in the first round match of DFB-Pokal against SC Pfullendorf, where they won 2–0.

Six days later, Përdedaj played for the first time in a match of the 2. Bundesliga where they won against Rot-Weiß Oberhausen 3–2. Over the course of that season, Perdedaj went on to make 15 more appearances in the 2. Bundesliga.

In November 2010, he renewed his contract with Hertha BSC until 2015. On 4 March 2012, Përdedaj made his Bundesliga debut. In an interview following this match, Hertha-coach Otto Rehhagel nicknamed him "Paradise", partly due to his performance in the match, partly due to the fact that Rehhagel could not pronounce "Përdedaj" correctly. Perdedaj went on to play in seven of Hertha's ten remaining games that season.

The following season, he left Hertha on the last day of the summer transfer window, and signed a loan deal with Lyngby Boldklub. In his first six months in Denmark, Përdedaj struggled to establish himself as a starter for Lyngnby, starting eight of nineteen matches before the winter break, and coming on as substitute in another four. He briefly returned to Berlin in January to participate in the Hertha BSC training camp to stay fit over the break, which is much longer in Denmark than in Germany.

He signed a contract with FC Energie Cottbus on 17 January 2014 for a year and a half.

== International career ==
=== Germany ===
==== Youth ====
Having received German citizenship on 21 September 2009, Përdedaj has represented Germany at various youth levels. He was first nominated for the German U19 team by Horst Hrubesch where he debuted on 18 November 2009 in a match against Scotland and he featured repeatedly in qualifying for the 2010 U19-European Championship, but missed the finals due to injury.

He made his debut for the U-21 team on 11 October 2010 in a match against Ukraine, coming on as a substitute for Christoph Moritz.

=== Kosovo ===
He then made his senior debut for Kosovo in a March 2014 friendly match against Haiti and has, as of January 2020, earned a total of 12 caps, scoring no goals.
