= Levent Ayçiçek =

German footballer

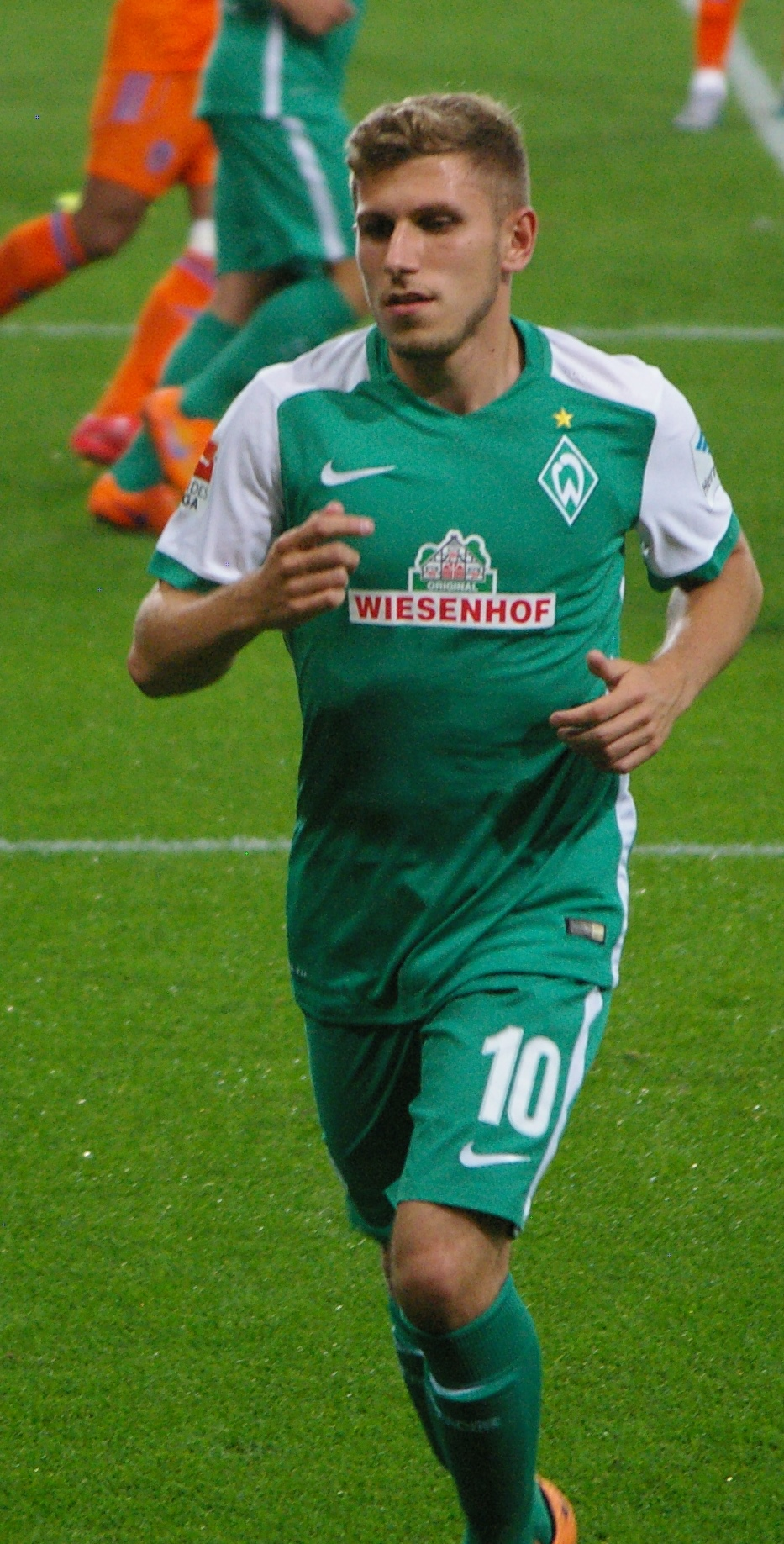
- Ayçiçek in pre-season with Werder Bremen in 2015

Personal information
- Date of birth: 14 February 1994 (age 32)
- Place of birth: Nienburg, Germany
- Height: 1.69 m (5 ft 7 in)
- Position: Attacking midfielder

Team information
- Current team: Hannover 96 II
- Number: 33

Youth career
- 1999–2005: RSV Rehburg
- 2005–2008: Hannover 96
- 2008–2012: Werder Bremen

Senior career*
Years	Team	Apps	(Gls)
2012–2016	Werder Bremen II	54	(17)
2012–2017	Werder Bremen	13	(2)
2016–2017	→ 1860 Munich (loan)	37	(6)
2017–2019	Greuther Fürth	21	(0)
2019–2021	Adana Demirspor	21	(2)
2020–2021	→ İstanbulspor (loan)	33	(4)
2021–2025	Bandırmaspor	91	(9)
2026–	Hannover 96 II	9	(1)

International career
2009	Germany U15	2	(2)
2009–2010	Germany U16	7	(4)
2010–2011	Germany U17	21	(8)
2013	Germany U20	1	(0)
Medal record
Men's football
Representing Germany
European Under-17 Championship
Runner-up	2011
FIFA U-17 World Cup
Bronze medal – third place	2011
- * Club domestic league appearances and goals as of 22 September 2026

Levent Ayçiçek (born 14 February 1994) is a German professional footballer who plays as an attacking midfielder for Hannover 96 II.

== Club career ==
Ayçiçek made his Bundesliga debut on 8 February 2014 scoring Werder Bremen's only goal in a 5–1 defeat to Borussia Dortmund. He went on to make 13 appearances before the 2015–2016 season during which he only played for Werder Bremen's reserve team.

In March 2015, Ayçiçek signed a contract extension until 2018. In January 2016, he joined 1860 Munich on loan for the remainder of the season. The loan was extended by a further season in June.

On 31 August 2017, the last day of the German summer transfer window, Ayçiçek moved to Greuther Fürth on a permanent transfer, signing a two-year contract.

== Career statistics ==
=== Club ===
As of 31 July 2021

Appearances and goals by club, season and competition
Club	Season	League			Cup		Other^{1}		Total	
Club	Season	Division	Apps	Goals	Apps	Goals	Apps	Goals	Apps	Goals
Werder Bremen II	2013–14	Regionalliga Nord	24	7	—		—		24	7
Werder Bremen II	2014–15	Regionalliga Nord	11	7	—		2 (Note: Appearance(s) in Regionalliga playoffs)	1	13	8
Werder Bremen II	2015–16	3. Liga	13	1	—		—		13	1
Werder Bremen II	2017–18	3. Liga	6	2	—		—		6	2
Werder Bremen II	Total		54	17	0	0	2	1	56	18
Werder Bremen	2013–14	Bundesliga	2	1	—		—		2	1
Werder Bremen	2014–15	Bundesliga	11	1	1	0	—		12	1
Werder Bremen	Total		13	2	1	0	0	0	14	2
1860 Munich	2015–16	2. Bundesliga	14	1	—		—		14	1
1860 Munich	2016–17	2. Bundesliga	23	5	2	0	—		25	5
1860 Munich	Total		37	6	2	0	0	0	39	6
Greuther Fürth	2017–18	2. Bundesliga	21	0	1	0	—		22	0
Adana Demirspor	2018–19	TFF First League	12	1	0	0	1 (Note: Appearance(s) in TFF First League playoffs)	0	13	1
Adana Demirspor	2019–20	TFF First League	9	1	1	0	0	0	10	1
Adana Demirspor	Total		21	2	1	0	1	0	23	2
İstanbulspor (loan)	2020–21	TFF First League	33	4	1	0	2	0	36	4
Career total			179	31	6	0	5	1	190	32
