= Sebastian Hertner =

German footballer (1991–2025)

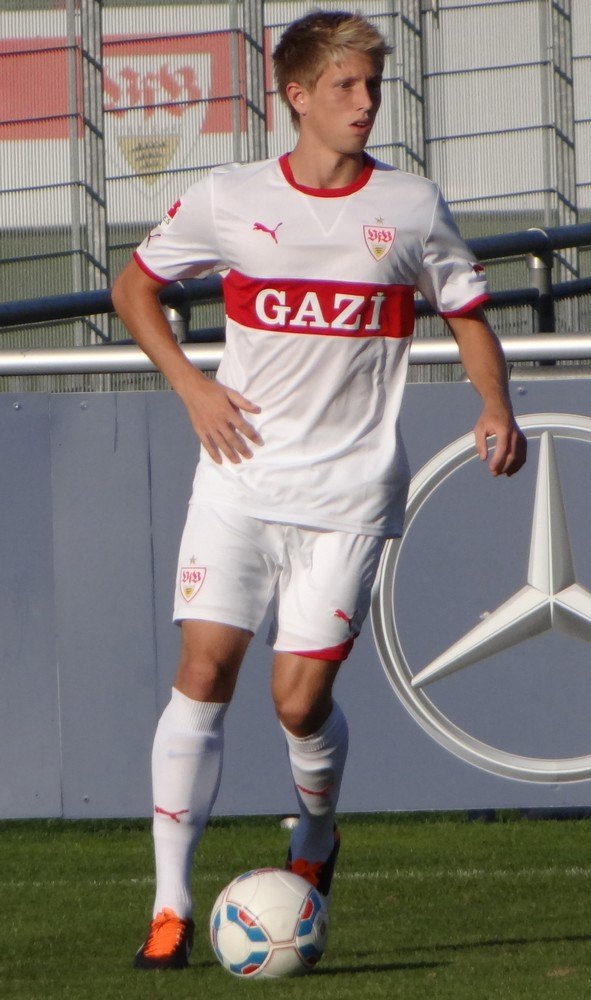
- Hertner in 2011

Personal information
- Date of birth: 2 May 1991
- Place of birth: Leonberg, Baden-Württemberg, Germany
- Date of death: 21 December 2025 (aged 34)
- Place of death: Žabljak, Montenegro
- Height: 1.79 m (5 ft 10 in)
- Position: Defender

Youth career
- 1997–2005: KSG Gerlingen
- 2005–2009: VfB Stuttgart

Senior career*
Years	Team	Apps	(Gls)
2009–2012	VfB Stuttgart II	65	(1)
2012–2013	Schalke 04 II	34	(0)
2013–2015	1860 Munich	22	(0)
2013–2014	1860 Munich II	10	(0)
2015	→ Erzgebirge Aue II (loan)	1	(0)
2015	→ Erzgebirge Aue (loan)	10	(0)
2015–2018	Erzgebirge Aue	98	(1)
2018–2020	Darmstadt 98	6	(0)
2020–2021	VfB Lübeck	20	(1)
2021–2022	Türkgücü München	6	(0)
2022	BFC Dynamo	14	(0)
2022–2024	FC Teutonia Ottensen	47	(1)
2024–2025	ETSV Hamburg		

International career
2008–2009	Germany U18	14	(0)
2009	Germany U19	5	(0)
- * Club domestic league appearances and goals

Sebastian Hertner (2 May 1991 – 21 December 2025) was a German professional footballer who played as a defender. Hertner spent his entire professional career in Germany, and played in the 2. Bundesliga for 1860 Munich, Erzgebirge Aue and Darmstadt 98. He was part of the German under-18 and under-19 youth national teams between 2008 and 2009.

He died in a ski lift accident in Montenegro on 21 December 2025.

== Club career ==
=== Early career ===
Born on 2 May 1991 in Leonberg, Hertner started his career at the academy of KSG Gerlingen, before joining the academy of VfB Stuttgart in 2005. In the summer of 2009, Hertner joined VfB Stuttgart II for the 2009–10 season. Over three years, he made 65 appearances for Stuttgart II, scoring once. He joined Schalke 04 II in 2012, making 35 appearances in the Regionalliga West where he was the captain.

=== 1860 Munich ===
After a season at Schalke 04 II, Hertner joined 1860 Munich on a three-year contract. In a friendly match against St. Gallen in July 2013, Hertner tore a muscle in his left thigh, meaning he missed the first game of the season against FC St. Pauli. He made his debut for 1860 Munich, coming on as a half-time substitute for Grzegorz Wojtkowiak in a DFB-Pokal 4–3 penalties victory over 1. FC Heidenheim, following a 1–1 draw. Over the course of the 2013–14 season, he made 21 league appearances in the 2. Bundesliga, whilst he made just one league appearance in the 2014–15 season before leaving on loan.

=== Erzgebirge Aue ===
On 20 January 2015, Hertner joined 2. Bundesliga side Erzgebirge Aue on loan until the end of the season. He made his debut for Aue on 6 February 2015 as a 65th-minute substitute in a 2–0 victory over RB Leipzig. Despite their relegation to the 3. Liga, it was announced he would join Aue on a permanent basis for an undisclosed fee, signing a one-year contract with the club after making 10 appearances during his loan spell there. He scored his first goal for the club and the second of his career on 15 August 2015; a late penalty in a 2–0 victory at home to Stuttgarter Kickers. Having been an integral part of the Aue team that would eventually win promotion back to the 2. Bundesliga come the end of the season, Hertner signed a two-year contract extension with Aue in February 2016, which would keep him at the club until the summer of 2018. During the 2015–16 season, he made 31 league appearances, scoring once.

The 2016–17 season marked a return to the 2. Bundesliga for Erzgebirge Aue, though Hertner retained his place in the starting line-up, missing just two league matches all season. It was a largely unremarkable season for the club, finishing 14th and three points above the relegation play-off place. Hertner remained at the club for the 2017–18 season, though played a less vital role, starting just 16 games, in a season where Aue narrowly avoided relegation, finishing 16th.

=== Darmstadt 98 ===
With his contract having not been renewed at Erzgebirge Aue, Hertner joined newly relegated 2. Bundesliga team Darmstadt 98 in the summer of 2018 on a two-year contract. He made his competitive debut for Darmstadt on 5 August 2018, coming on as an 80th-minute substitute in a 1–0 win against Paderborn 07 in their opening game of the season. However, first-team opportunities for Hertner were limited and he made just five appearances in all competitions across the 2018–19 season, and played just twice during the 2019–20 season. He was released by Darmstadt in summer 2020.

=== VfB Lübeck ===
Hertner signed a one-year contract with 3. Liga side VfB Lübeck in September 2020. He transferred to Türkgücü München in June 2021.

=== Later career ===
On 23 January 2022, Hertner joined BFC Dynamo and stayed there for half a year. He joined FC Teutonia Ottensen in September 2022, and transferred to ETSV Hamburg in summer 2024, alongside fellow Teutonia Ottensen players Tjorben Uphoff and Ridel Monteiro. He remained at the club until his death in December 2025.

== International career ==
Hertner appeared for the Germany under-18 team and the under-19 team, having made 14 appearances for the former and five for the latter.

== Death ==
Hertner died in a ski lift accident on Savin Kuk in Žabljak, Montenegro, on 21 December 2025. The collision of two chairlifts caused him to fall 70 meters. Hertner's wife was injured after being trapped in the ski lift but was eventually rescued. He was 34.
