= Romuald Lacazette =

French footballer (born 1994)

Personal information
- Full name: Romuald Lacazette
- Date of birth: 3 January 1994 (age 32)
- Place of birth: Paris, France
- Height: 1.75 m (5 ft 9 in)
- Position: Midfielder

Team information
- Current team: Türkgücü München
- Number: 29

Youth career
- 2012–2013: Paris Saint-Germain

Senior career*
Years	Team	Apps	(Gls)
2013–2015	Paris Saint-Germain II	46	(0)
2013–2015	Paris Saint-Germain	0	(0)
2015–2016	1860 Munich II	4	(2)
2015–2017	1860 Munich	34	(1)
2017–2019	Darmstadt 98	3	(0)
2018–2019	→ 1860 Munich (loan)	11	(0)
2020–2021	Villefranche	8	(0)
2021–2022	TSV Wasserburg	2	(0)
2022	Lancy	9	(0)
2022–2024	Wacker Innsbruck	24	(5)
2024–	Türkgücü München	11	(0)
- * Club domestic league appearances and goals as of 1 January 2025

Romuald Lacazette (born 3 January 1994) is a French professional footballer who plays as a midfielder for Regionalliga Bayern club Türkgücü München.

== Personal life ==
Lacazette was born in Paris on 3 January 1994. His cousin Alexandre Lacazette is also a professional footballer.

== Career ==
=== Early career ===
He played for Paris Saint-Germain, joining its youth team in 2012. He then played for PSG II for the whole season. Despite receiving a call up to the first team, he could not feature for them.

=== TSV 1860 Munich ===
Lacazette was transferred to 1860 Munich on 18 July 2015. During the 2015–16 season, he scored two goals in three matches played for the reserve team and made nine appearances for the first team. He made his first team debut in a 3–0 loss to SC Freiburg on 20 December 2015. On 20 March 2016, Lacazette received a red card against Arminia Bielefeld in a 1–1 draw.

=== Darmstadt 98 ===
Lacazette joined Darmstadt 98 from 1860 Munich on a three-year contract until 2020.

On 31 August 2018, Lacazette returned to 1860 Munich on loan until the end of the 2018–19 season.

=== Villefranche ===
After a season without a club, Lacazette joined French Championnat National side FC Villefranche in July 2020.

=== TSV Wasserburg ===
In the summer of 2021, he joined German fifth-tier Bayernliga club TSV Wasserburg in his wife's hometown to maintain shape, without signing with the club. In November 2021, he officially joined the team.
