= Daylon Claasen =

South African soccer player (born 1990)

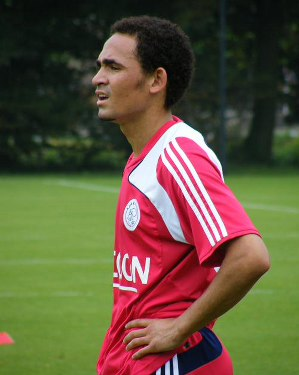
- Claasen with Ajax in 2009

Personal information
- Full name: Daylon Kayton Claasen
- Date of birth: 28 January 1990 (age 36)
- Place of birth: Klerksdorp, South Africa
- Height: 1.76 m (5 ft 9 in)
- Positions: Right winger; attacking midfielder

Team information
- Current team: Cape Town Spurs
- Number: 15

Youth career
- Leicester City Klerksdorp
- Vasco Da Gama
- 2002–2006: Ajax Cape Town

Senior career*
Years	Team	Apps	(Gls)
2006–2008	Ajax Cape Town	2	(0)
2008–2010	Ajax	0	(0)
2010–2013	Lierse	69	(11)
2013–2014	Lech Poznań	23	(3)
2014–2017	1860 Munich	49	(1)
2017–2019	Bidvest Wits	32	(1)
2019–2022	Maritzburg United	89	(5)
2024–	Cape Town Spurs	1	(0)

International career^{‡}
2010–2015	South Africa	11	(0)
- * Club domestic league appearances and goals as of 10 September 2024 ‡ National team caps and goals as of 10 November 2022

Daylon Kayton Claasen (born 28 January 1990) is a South African international soccer player who plays for Cape Town Spurs, as a winger.

== Club career ==
Born in Klerksdorp, Claasen played youth football with Leicester City Klerksdorp and Vasco Da Gama. He has played professionally in South Africa, the Netherlands and Belgium for Ajax Cape Town, Ajax and Lierse.

Claasen was released by Lierse in April 2013, and subsequently went on trial with Premier League club Everton the same month.

Claasen then went on trial with newly promoted Premier League club Hull City in July 2013, initially under the pseudonym of "James Armstrong" for a match against Winterton Rangers, where he scored one goal, before his actual identity was revealed two days later.

On 21 August 2013, he signed a one-year contract with Polish club Lech Poznań.

In June 2014 he signed a contract with German 2. Bundesliga club 1860 Munich. He scored his first goal for 1860 Munich on 8 August 2015 in the first round of the DFB-Pokal against Hoffenheim, when he brought his team to a 1–0 lead in the 51st minute.

In the summer of 2024 he signed for newly relegated second-tier club Cape Town Spurs.

== International career ==
Claasen made his international debut for South Africa in 2010.
