= 2011–12 FC Augsburg season =

FC Augsburg
2011–12 season
- Manager: Jos Luhukay
- Stadium: SGL arena Augsburg, Bavaria
- Bundesliga: 14th
- DFB-Pokal: Third round
- Top goalscorer: League: Sascha Mölders; Koo Ja-cheol (5 each); All: Sascha Mölders; Koo Ja-cheol; Torsten Oehrl (5 each)
- Highest home attendance: 30,660
- Lowest home attendance: 29,110
- Average home league attendance: 30,220
| Home colours | Away colours | Third colours |

The 2011–12 FC Augsburg season was the 105th season in the football club's history and the club's inaugural season in the Bundesliga. The season started on 30 July against Rot-Weiß Oberhausen in the DFB-Pokal. Promotion to the 2011–12 Bundesliga was the culmination of a decade-long process started by clothing magnate Walther Seinisch.

== Review and events ==
2011–12 season was the club's debut season in the Bundesliga.

== Competitions ==
=== Bundesliga ===
==== League table ====
| Pos | Team | Pld | W | D | L | GF | GA | GD | Pts | Qualification or relegation |
|---|---|---|---|---|---|---|---|---|---|---|
| 12 | SC Freiburg | 34 | 10 | 10 | 14 | 45 | 61 | −16 | 40 | |
| 13 | FSV Mainz 05 | 34 | 9 | 12 | 13 | 47 | 51 | −4 | 39 | |
| 14 | FC Augsburg | 34 | 8 | 14 | 12 | 36 | 49 | −13 | 38 | |
| 15 | Hamburger SV | 34 | 8 | 12 | 14 | 35 | 57 | −22 | 36 | |
| 16 | Hertha BSC (R) | 34 | 7 | 10 | 17 | 38 | 64 | −26 | 31 | Qualification to relegation play-offs |

Source: kicker
Rules for classification: 1) points; 2) goal difference; 3) number of goals scored.
(R) Relegated

==== Matches ====
Win Draw Loss

| 6 August 1 | FC Augsburg | 2–2 | SC Freiburg | Augsburg |
| 15:30 CEST (UTC+02) | Mölders 53', 81' | Match Report | Cissé 48'; Makiadi 55' | Stadium: SGL arena Attendance: 30,403; Referee: Jochen Drees; Man of the Match: Mölders |

| 14 August 2 | 1. FC Kaiserslautern | 1–1 | FC Augsburg | Kaiserslautern |
| 15:30 CEST (UTC+02) | Shechter 80' | Match Report | Mölders 9' | Stadium: Fritz-Walter-Stadion; Attendance: 40,248; Referee: Tobias Welz; Man of the Match: Jentzsch |

| 20 August 3 | FC Augsburg | 0–2 | 1899 Hoffenheim | Augsburg |
| 15:30 CEST (UTC+02) | | Match Report | Babel 5'; Salihović 75' (pen.) | Stadium: SGL arena Attendance: 30,004; Referee: Markus Wingenbach; Man of the Match: Starke |

| 27 August 4 | 1. FC Nürnberg | 1–0 | FC Augsburg | Nuremberg |
| 15:30 CEST (UTC+02) | Esswein 76' | Match Report | | Stadium: easyCredit-Stadion; Attendance: 43,071; Referee: Thorsten Kinhöfer; Man of the Match: Esswein |

| 9 September 5 | FC Augsburg | 1–4 | Bayer Leverkusen | Augsburg |
| 20:30 CEST (UTC+02) | Hosogai 5' | Match Report | Sam 6', 72'; Kießling 23'; Derdiyok 79' | Stadium: SGL arena Attendance: 30,660; Referee: Felix Zwayer; Man of the Match: Sam |

| 17 September 6 | Hertha BSC | 2–2 | FC Augsburg | Berlin |
| 15:30 CEST (UTC+02) | Lell 46'; Torun 57' | Match Report | Hosogai 20'; Callsen-Bracker 64' | Stadium: Olympic Stadium; Attendance: 48,385; Referee: Markus Schmidt; Man of the Match: Lell |

| 24 September 7 | FC Augsburg | 0–0 | Hannover 96 | Augsburg |
| 15:30 CEST (UTC+02) | | Match Report | | Stadium: SGL arena Attendance: 29,113; Referee: Christian Dingert; Man of the Match: Pander |

| 1 October 8 | Borussia Dortmund | 4–0 | FC Augsburg | Dortmund |
| 15:30 CEST (UTC+02) | Lewandowski 30', 44', 78'; Götze 75' | Match Report | | Stadium: Signal Iduna Park; Attendance: 80,720; Referee: Babak Rafati; Man of the Match: Lewandowski |

| 15 October 9 | Mainz 05 | 0–1 | FC Augsburg | Mainz |
| 15:30 CEST (UTC+02) | | Match Report | Callsen-Bracker 82' (pen.) | Stadium: Coface Arena; Attendance: 30,195; Referee: Marco Fritz; Man of the Match: Jentzsch |

| 21 October 10 | FC Augsburg | 1–1 | Werder Bremen | Augsburg |
| 20:30 CEST (UTC+02) | Bellinghausen 49' | Match Report | Pizarro 68' | Stadium: SGL arena Attendance: 30,660; Referee: Knut Kircher; Man of the Match: Jentzsch |

| 30 October 11 | 1. FC Köln | 3–0 | FC Augsburg | Cologne |
| 15:30 CET (UTC+01) | Podolski 19', 24' (pen.); Peszko 56' | Match Report | | Stadium: RheinEnergieStadion; Attendance: 48,000; Referee: Peter Gagelmann; Man of the Match: Podolski |

| 6 November 12 | FC Augsburg | 1–2 | Bayern Munich | Augsburg |
| 15:30 CET (UTC+01) | Hosogai 59' | Match Report | Gómez 16'; Ribéry 28' | Stadium: SGL arena Attendance: 30,660 (sell-out); Referee: Felix Zwayer; Man of the Match: Ribéry |

| 20 November 13 | VfB Stuttgart | 2–1 | FC Augsburg | Stuttgart |
| 15:30 CET (UTC+01) | Harnik 41', 51' | Match Report | Werner 47' | Stadium: Mercedes-Benz Arena; Attendance: 60,000; Referee: Christian Dingert; Man of the Match: Harnik |

| 26 November 14 | FC Augsburg | 2–0 | VfL Wolfsburg | Augsburg |
| 15:30 CET (UTC+01) | Brinkmann 65'; Kapllani 90+4' | Match Report | | Stadium: SGL arena Attendance: 29,110; Referee: Guido Winkmann; Man of the Match: Langkamp |

| 4 December 15 | Schalke 04 | 3–1 | FC Augsburg | Gelsenkirchen |
| 17:30 CET (UTC+01) | Huntelaar 16'; Fuchs 66'; Raúl 84' | Match Report | Mölders 47' | Stadium: Veltins-Arena; Attendance: 58,641; Referee: Markus Wingenbach; Man of the Match: Fuchs |

| 10 December 16 | FC Augsburg | 1–0 | Borussia Mönchengladbach | Augsburg |
| 15:30 CET (UTC+01) | Callsen-Bracker 51' | Match Report | | Stadium: SGL arena Attendance: 30,660; Referee: Markus Schmidt; Man of the Match: Sankoh |

| 17 December 17 | Hamburger SV | 1–1 | FC Augsburg | Hamburg |
| 15:30 CET (UTC+01) | Guerrero 66' | Match Report | Oehrl 63' | Stadium: Imtech Arena; Attendance: 48,143; Referee: Tobias Welz |

| 21 January 18 | SC Freiburg | 1–0 | FC Augsburg | Freiburg |
| 15:30 CET (UTC+01) | Flum (yellow card) 87'; Ginter 88' | Summary | Werner (yellow card) 49'; De Jong (yellow card) 67'; Verhaegh (yellow card) 90+2' | Stadium: badenova-Stadion; Attendance: 19,600; Referee: Florian Meyer |

| 28 January 19 | FC Augsburg | 2–2 | 1. FC Kaiserslautern | Augsburg |
| 15:30 CET (UTC+01) | De Jong 5', (yellow card) 27'; Brinkmann (yellow card) 48'; Hain 66' | Summary | Świerczok (yellow card) 3'; Wagner (yellow card) 11'; Dick 25', 48'; Fortounis (yellow card) 65'; Jørgensen (yellow card) 90+1' | Stadium: SGL arena Attendance: 30,028; Referee: Manuel Gräfe |

| 4 February 20 | 1899 Hoffenheim | 2–2 | FC Augsburg | Sinsheim |
| 15:30 CET (UTC+01) | Williams (yellow card) 23'; Salihović (yellow card) 26', (goal) 51' (pen.); Mlapa 38'; Babel (yellow card) 86'; Vestergaard (yellow card) 90' | Summary | Mölders 31'; Langkamp (yellow card) 42', (goal) 72'; Baier (yellow card) 45' | Stadium: Rhein-Neckar-Arena; Attendance: 22,500; Referee: Markus Wingenbach |

| 12 February 21 | FC Augsburg | 0–0 | 1. FC Nürnberg | Augsburg |
| 15:30 CET (UTC+01) | Verhaegh (yellow card) 66'; Baier (yellow card) 84' | Summary | Cohen (yellow card) 11'; Frantz (yellow card) 23'; Feulner (yellow card) 64'; Maroh (yellow card) 71' | Stadium: SGL arena Attendance: 30,660; Referee: Jochen Drees |

| 18 February 22 | Bayer Leverkusen | 4–1 | FC Augsburg | Leverkusen |
| 15:30 CET (UTC+01) | Kießling 25', 64'; Castro 60'; Schürrle 70' | Summary | Ostrzolek (yellow card) 21'; Koo J.C. 50'; Mölders (yellow card) 56'; Callsen-Bracker (yellow card) 58'; Langkamp (yellow card) 68' | Stadium: BayArena; Attendance: 23,368; Referee: Guido Winkmann |

| 25 February 23 | FC Augsburg | 3–0 | Hertha BSC | Augsburg |
| 15:30 CET (UTC+01) | Oehrl 61', 63'; Ndjeng 90+1' | Summary | Kobiashvili (yellow card) 39'; Niemeyer (yellow card) 46'; Morales (yellow card) 78'; Mijatović (yellow card) 82' | Stadium: SGL arena Attendance: 29,123; Referee: Florian Meyer |

| 3 March 24 | Hannover 96 | 2–2 | FC Augsburg | Hanover |
| 15:30 CET (UTC+01) | Haggui 33'; Schulz (yellow card) 34'; Diouf 69' | Summary | Bellinghausen 12'; Sankoh (yellow card) 38'; Callsen-Bracker 89' | Stadium: AWD-Arena; Attendance: 42,300; Referee: Markus Schmidt |

| 10 March 25 | FC Augsburg | 0–0 | Borussia Dortmund | Augsburg |
| 18:30 CET (UTC+01) | Koo J.C. (yellow card) 39'; Sankoh (yellow card) 42' | Summary | Subotić (yellow card) 43'; Kehl (yellow card) 45' | Stadium: SGL arena Attendance: 30,660; Referee: Knut Kircher |

| 17 March 26 | FC Augsburg | 2–1 | Mainz 05 | Augsburg |
| 15:30 CET (UTC+01) | Koo J.C. 43'; Langkamp 51'; Hosogai (yellow card) 71'; Bellinghausen (yellow card) 83' | Summary | Allagui 36'; Zabavník (yellow card) 63'; Wetklo (yellow card) 90+1' | Stadium: SGL arena Attendance: 30,025; Referee: Michael Weiner |

| 24 March 27 | Werder Bremen | 1–1 | FC Augsburg | Bremen |
| 15:30 CET (UTC+01) | Fritz (yellow card) 18'; Füllkrug 61'; Affolter (yellow card) 86'; Rosenberg (yellow card) 90+2' | Summary | Davids (yellow card) 53'; Verhaegh (yellow card) 66', (goal) 90+2'; Baier (yellow card) 81' | Stadium: Weserstadion; Attendance: 40,208; Referee: Markus Wingenbach |

| 31 March 28 | FC Augsburg | 2–1 | 1. FC Köln | Augsburg |
| 15:30 CET (UTC+01) | Koo J.C. 19'; Sankoh (yellow card) 33'; Rafael 45' (pen.) | Summary | Geromel (yellow card) 26'; Lanig (yellow card) 29'; Podolski 42' (pen.); Brečko (yellow card) 54'; Sereno (yellow card) 76' | Stadium: SGL arena Attendance: 30,660; Referee: Tobias Welz |

| 7 April 29 | Bayern Munich | 2–1 | FC Augsburg | Munich |
| 15:30 CET (UTC+01) | Gómez 1', 60'; Badstuber (yellow card) 38' | Summary | Koo J.C. 23' | Stadium: Allianz Arena; Attendance: 69,000; Referee: Florian Meyer |

| 10 April 2012 30 | FC Augsburg | 1–3 | VfB Stuttgart | Augsburg |
| 20:00 CET (UTC+01) | Rafael 5' (pen.); Ostrzolek (yellow card) 60'; Amsif (yellow card) 66' | Summary | Tasci 24'; Niedermeier (yellow card) 28'; Harnik 34'; Kuzmanović (yellow card) 37'; Sakai (yellow card) 67'; Ibišević 84' | Stadium: SGL arena Attendance: 30,660; Referee: Guido Winkmann |

| 14 April 31 | VfL Wolfsburg | 1–2 | FC Augsburg | Wolfsburg |
| 15:30 CET (UTC+01) | Helmes 27', (yellow card) 48'; Mandžukić (yellow card) 36'; Benaglio (yellow card) 72' | Summary | Oehrl 13'; Baier (yellow card) 20'; Bellinghausen (yellow card) 45+1'; Langkamp 88' | Stadium: Volkswagen Arena; Attendance: 25,143; Referee: Thorsten Kinhöfer |

| 22 April 32 | FC Augsburg | 1–1 | Schalke 04 | Augsburg |
| 15:30 CET (UTC+01) | Langkamp 6'; Baier (yellow card) 45'; Callsen-Bracker (yellow card) 73'; Oehrl (yellow card) 82'; Hosogai (yellow card) 88' | Summary | Huntelaar 38'; Metzelder (yellow card) 43'; Jones (yellow card) 80'; Matip (yellow card) 89' | Stadium: SGL arena Attendance: 30,660; Referee: Christian Dingert |

| 28 April 33 | Borussia Mönchengladbach | 0–0 | FC Augsburg | Mönchengladbach |
| 15:30 CEST (UTC+02) | | Summary | Ndjeng (yellow card) 42'; Morávek (yellow card) 72' | Stadium: Borussia-Park; Attendance: 53,306; Referee: Michael Weiner |

| 5 May 34 | FC Augsburg | 1–0 | Hamburger SV | Augsburg |
| 15:30 CEST (UTC+02) | Koo J.C. 34', (yellow card) 85'; Rafael (yellow card) 76' | Report | Guerrero (yellow card) 64'; Aogo (yellow card) 70' | Stadium: SGL arena Attendance: 30,660; Referee: Manuel Gräfe |

=== DFB-Pokal ===
| 30 July 1st Round | Rot-Weiß Oberhausen | 1–2 (a.e.t.) | FC Augsburg | Oberhausen |
| 19:30 CEST (UTC+02) | Kullmann 24' | Match Report | Verhaegh 31'; De Roeck 120' | Stadium: Niederrheinstadion; Attendance: 3,786; Referee: Marco Fritz |

| 25 October 2nd Round | RasenBallsport Leipzig | 0–1 | FC Augsburg | Leipzig |
| 19:30 CEST (UTC+02) | | Match Report | Brinkmann 62' | Stadium: Red Bull Arena; Attendance: 34,341; Referee: Florian Meyer; Man of the Match: Brinkmann |

| 20 December 3rd Round | 1899 Hoffenheim | 2–1 | FC Augsburg | Sinsheim |
| 20:30 CET (UTC+01) | Salihović 23'; Ibišević 49' | Match Report | Oehrl 36' | Stadium: Rhein-Neckar Arena; Attendance: 10,000; Referee: Thorsten Kinhöfer |

== Player information ==
=== Roster and statistics ===
As of 16 December 2011

Squad Season 2011–12
| Player | | | | | Bundesliga | | DFB-Pokal | | Totals | |
| Player | Nat. | Birthday | at FCA since | Previous club | Matches | Goals | Matches | Goal | Matches | Goals |
Goalkeepers
| Simon Jentzsch | German | 4 May 1976 | 2009 | VfL Wolfsburg | 11 | 0 | 1 | 0 | 12 | 0 |
| Mohamed Amsif | Moroccan | 7 February 1989 | 2010 | Schalke 04 | 5 | 0 | 1 | 0 | 6 | 0 |
| Ioannis Gelios | German | 24 April 1992 | 2001 | MBB-SG Augsburg | 0 | 0 | 0 | 0 | 0 | 0 |
Defenders
| Axel Bellinghausen | German | 17 May 1983 | 2009 | 1. FC Kaiserslautern | 11 | 1 | 1 | 0 | 12 | 0 |
| Marcel de Jong | Canadian | 15 October 1986 | 2010 | Roda JC | 7 | 0 | 1 | 0 | 8 | 0 |
| Jonas de Roeck | Belgian | 20 December 1979 | 2009 | K.A.A. Gent | 7 | 0 | 2 | 1 | 9 | 1 |
| Sebastian Langkamp | German | 15 January 1988 | 2011 | Karlsruher SC | 9 | 0 | 1 | 0 | 10 | 0 |
| Uwe Möhrle | German | 3 December 1979 | 2007 | VfL Wolfsburg | 8 | 0 | 1 | 0 | 9 | 0 |
| Dominik Reinhardt | German | 19 December 1984 | 2009 | 1. FC Nürnberg | 11 | 0 | 0 | 0 | 11 | 0 |
| Gibril Sankoh | Sierra Leonean | 15 May 1983 | 2010 | Groningen | 9 | 0 | 1 | 0 | 10 | 0 |
| Paul Verhaegh | Dutch | 1 September 1983 | 2010 | Vitesse | 8 | 0 | 2 | 1 | 10 | 1 |
| Jan-Ingwer Callsen-Bracker | German | 23 September 1984 | 2011 | Borussia Mönchengladbach | 15 | 3 | 1 | 0 | 16 | 3 |
Midfielders
| Dawda Bah | Gambian | 18 November 1983 | 2011 | HJK Helsinki | 1 | 0 | 0 | 0 | 1 | 0 |
| Daniel Baier | German | 18 May 1984 | 2010 | VfL Wolfsburg | 16 | 0 | 1 | 0 | 17 | 0 |
| Daniel Brinkmann | German | 29 January 1986 | 2009 | Alemannia Aachen | 11 | 1 | 1 | 1 | 12 | 2 |
| Lorenzo Davids | Dutch | 4 September 1986 | 2011 | NEC | 15 | 0 | 2 | 0 | 17 | 0 |
| Akaki Gogia | German | 18 January 1992 | 2011 | VfL Wolfsburg | 12 | 0 | 1 | 0 | 13 | 0 |
| Hajime Hosogai | Japanese | 10 June 1986 | 2010 | Urawa Red Diamonds | 15 | 3 | 0 | 0 | 15 | 3 |
| Marcel Ndjeng | Cameroonian | 6 May 1982 | 2009 | Hamburger SV | 4 | 0 | 1 | 0 | 5 | 0 |
| Moritz Nebel | German | 21 September 1991 | 2002 | VfL Kaufering | 0 | 0 | 0 | 0 | 0 | 0 |
| Andrew Sinkala | Zambian | 18 June 1979 | 2008 | SC Paderborn | 6 | 0 | 1 | 0 | 7 | 0 |
| Marco Thiede | German | 20 May 1992 | 2004 | FC Gundelfingen | 0 | 0 | 1 | 0 | 1 | 0 |
| Tobias Werner | German | 19 July 1985 | 2008 | Carl Zeiss Jena | 12 | 1 | 2 | 0 | 14 | 1 |
Forwards
| Stephan Hain | German | 27 September 1988 | 2007 | SpVgg Ruhmannsfelden | 3 | 0 | 1 | 0 | 4 | 0 |
| Edmond Kapllani | Albanian | 31 July 1982 | 2011 | SC Paderborn | 5 | 1 | 1 | 0 | 6 | 1 |
| Patrick Mayer | German | 28 March 1988 | 2011 | 1. FC Heidenheim | 1 | 0 | 0 | 0 | 1 | 0 |
| Sascha Mölders | German | 20 March 1985 | 2011 | FSV Frankfurt | 16 | 4 | 1 | 0 | 17 | 4 |
| Torsten Oehrl | German | 7 January 1986 | 2010 | Fortuna Düsseldorf | 3 | 0 | 1 | 0 | 4 | 0 |
| Nando Rafael | Angolan | 10 January 1984 | 2010 | AGF Aarhus | 2 | 0 | 1 | 0 | 3 | 0 |
| Michael Thurk | German | 28 May 1976 | 2008 | Eintracht Frankfurt | 0 | 0 | 0 | 0 | 0 | 0 |

=== Transfers ===
==== In ====
| No. | Pos. | Nat. | Name | Age | EU | Moving from | Type | Transfer window | Ends | Transfer fee | Source |
|---|---|---|---|---|---|---|---|---|---|---|---|
| 19 | FW | (Germany) | Patrick Mayer | 23 | EU | 1. FC Heidenheim | Transfer | Summer | | | |
| 5 | MF | (Germany) | Dominic Peitz | 26 | EU | Union Berlin | Transfer | Summer | 2013 | Free | |
| 25 | MF | (The Gambia) | Dawda Bah | 27 | Non-EU | HJK (Finland) | Transfer | Summer | 2013 | Undisclosed | |
| 15 | DF | (Germany) | Sebastian Langkamp | 23 | EU | Karlsruher SC | Transfer | Summer | 2013 | Undisclosed | |
| 26 | MF | (Netherlands) | Lorenzo Davids | 24 | EU | NEC (Netherlands) | Transfer | Summer | 2013 | Free | |
| 28 | MF | (Germany) | Akaki Gogia | 19 | EU | VfL Wolfsburg | Loan | Summer | 2012 | | |
| 22 | FW | (Albania) | Edmond Kapllani | 28 | Non-EU | SC Paderborn | Return from Loan | Summer | 2012 | | |
| 33 | FW | (Germany) | Sascha Mölders | 26 | EU | FSV Frankfurt | Transfer | Summer | 2013 | €175,000 | |
| 37 | GK | (Germany) | Ioannis Gelios | 19 | EU | Youth system | Promoted | Summer | 2012 | n/a | |
| 31 | MF | (Germany) | Marco Thiede | 19 | EU | Youth system | Promoted | Summer | 2012 | n/a | |
| 31 | MF | (Czech Republic) | Jan Morávek | 22 | EU | Schalke 04 | Loan | Winter | 2012 | Undisclosed | |

==== Out ====
| No. | Pos. | Nat. | Name | Age | EU | Moving to | Type | Transfer window | Transfer fee | Source |
|---|---|---|---|---|---|---|---|---|---|---|
| | MF | (Germany) | Dominic Peitz | 26 | EU | Hansa Rostock | Loan | Summer | | |
| | DF | (Germany) | Lukas Sinkiewicz | 25 | EU | VfL Bochum | End of contract | Summer | Free | |
| | MF | (Germany) | Sören Bertram | 20 | EU | Hamburger SV | Loan return | Summer | | |
| | MF | (Netherlands) | Kees Kwakman | 28 | EU | Groningen (Netherlands) | End of contract | Summer | Free | |
| | MF | (Germany) | Moritz Leitner | 20 | EU | Borussia Dortmund | Loan return | Summer | | |
| | MF | (Guinea) | Ibrahima Traoré | 23 | EU | VfB Stuttgart | End of contract | Summer | Free | |
| 5 | DF | (Germany) | Uwe Möhrle | 32 | EU | Energie Cottbus | Transfer | Winter | Undisclosed | |
| | FW | (Germany) | Michael Thurk | 34 | EU | 1. FC Heidenheim | Contract canceled | Winter | Free | |
| 19 | FW | (Germany) | Patrick Mayer | 23 | EU | 1. FC Heidenheim | Loan | Winter | Undisclosed | |
