= 2012–13 FC Augsburg season =

FC Augsburg
2012–13 season
- Chairman: Walther Seinsch
- Manager: Markus Weinzierl
- Stadium: SGL arena, Augsburg, Bavaria
- Bundesliga: 15th
- DFB-Pokal: Third round
- Top goalscorer: League: Sascha Mölders (10); All: Sascha Mölders (10)
- Highest home attendance: 30,660
- Lowest home attendance: 25,211
- Average home league attendance: 29,078
Home colours	Away colours	Third colours

The 2012–13 FC Augsburg season was the 106th season in the club's football history. In 2012–13 the club played in the Bundesliga, the top tier of German football. It was the clubs second consecutive season in this league, having been promoted from the 2. Bundesliga in 2011. FC Augsburg also participated in the season's edition of the DFB-Pokal. It was the fourth season for FC Augsburg in the SGL arena.

== Review and events ==
The club also participated in the 2012–13 edition of the DFB-Pokal, the German Cup, where it reached the third round before losing to third division side Preußen Münster.

== Matches ==
=== Legend ===
Win Draw Loss Postponed

=== Bundesliga ===
==== League results and fixtures ====
Match	Date	Time	Venue	City	Opponent	Result^{1}	Attendance	FC Augsburg goalscorers	Table		Source
Match	Date	Time	Venue	City	Opponent	Result^{1}	Attendance	FC Augsburg goalscorers	Pos.	Pts	Source
1	25 August 2012	15:30	SGL arena	Augsburg	Fortuna Düsseldorf	0–2	30,401	—	17	0	
2	1 September 2012	15:30	Veltins-Arena	Gelsenkirchen	Schalke 04	1–3	60,582	Oehrl 79'	16	0	
3	14 September 2012	20:30	SGL arena	Augsburg	VfL Wolfsburg	0–0	28,512	—	15	1	
4	22 September 2012	15:30	Coface Arena	Mainz	Mainz 05	0–2	28,463	—	18	1	
5	26 September 2012	20:00	SGL arena	Augsburg	Bayer Leverkusen	1–3	25,211	Werner 51'	18	1	
6	29 September 2012	15:30	Rhein-Neckar Arena	Sinsheim	TSG 1899 Hoffenheim	0–0	22,000	—	18	2	
7	5 October 2012	20:30	SGL arena	Augsburg	Werder Bremen	3–1	28,133	Werner 2'; Hain 32'; Baier 72'	16	5	
8	21 October 2012	15:30	Max-Morlock-Stadion	Nuremberg	1. FC Nürnberg	0–0	40,171	—	16	6	
9	26 October 2012	20:30	SGL arena	Augsburg	Hamburger SV	0–2	30,660	—	17	6	
10	3 November 2012	15:30	AWD-Arena	Hanover	Hannover 96	0–2	41,200	—	18	6	
11	10 November 2012	15:30	SGL arena	Augsburg	Borussia Dortmund	1–3	30,660	Mölders 81'	18	6	
12	17 November 2012	15:30	Commerzbank-Arena	Frankfurt	Eintracht Frankfurt	2–4	47,700	Koo 45'; Mölders 64'	18	6	
13	25 November 2012	17:30	SGL arena	Augsburg	Borussia Mönchengladbach	1–1	30,045	Mölders 5'	18	7	
14	28 November 2012	20:00	Mercedes-Benz Arena	Stuttgart	VfB Stuttgart	1–2	38,940	Koo 44'	18	7	
15	1 December 2012	15:30	SGL arena	Augsburg	SC Freiburg	1–1	27,144	Werner 9'	17	8	
16	8 December 2012	15:30	SGL arena	Augsburg	Bayern Munich	0–2	30,660	—	17	8	
17	15 December 2012	15:30	Trolli Arena	Fürth	Greuther Fürth	1–1	16,340	Mölders 9'	17	9	
18	20 January 2013	17:30	Esprit Arena	Düsseldorf	Fortuna Düsseldorf	3–2	40,623	Mölders 40', 71'; Koo 45'	17	12	
19	26 January 2013	15:30	SGL arena	Augsburg	Schalke 04	0–0	28,553	—	16	13	
20	2 February 2013	15:30	Volkswagen Arena	Wolfsburg	VfL Wolfsburg	1–1	22,257	Morávek 25'	17	14	
21	10 February 2013	15:30	SGL arena	Augsburg	Mainz 05	1–1	25,541	Mölders 57'	17	15	
22	16 February 2013	15:30	BayArena	Leverkusen	Bayer Leverkusen	1–2	22,784	Mölders 89'	17	15	
23	23 February 2013	15:30	SGL arena	Augsburg	1899 Hoffenheim	2–1	28,211	Ji 45'; Mölders 79'	16	18	
24	2 March 2013	15:30	Weserstadion	Bremen	Werder Bremen	1–0	39,211	Werner 29'	16	21	
25	8 March 2013	20:30	SGL arena	Augsburg	1. FC Nürnberg	1–2	30,660	Schafer 36' (o.g.)	16	21	
26	16 March 2013	15:30	Imtech Arena	Hamburg	Hamburger SV	1–0	52,529	Callsen-Bracker 8'	16	24	
27	30 March 2013	15:30	SGL arena	Augsburg	Hannover 96	0–2	28,511	—	16	24	
28	6 April 2013	15:30	Signal Iduna Park	Dortmund	Borussia Dortmund	2–4	80,645	Baier 43'; Vogt 44'	16	24	
29	14 April 2013	17:30	SGL arena	Augsburg	Eintracht Frankfurt	2–0	30,660	Ji 27', 55'	16	27	
30	19 April 2013	20:30	Borussia-Park	Mönchengladbach	Borussia Mönchengladbach	0–1	50,175	—	16	27	
31	27 April 2013	15:30	SGL arena	Augsburg	VfB Stuttgart	3–0	30,660	Mölders 61'; De Jong 83'; Ji 85'	16	30	
32	5 May 2013	15:30	Mage Solar Stadion	Freiburg	SC Freiburg	0–2	24,000	—	16	30	
33	11 May 2013	15:30	Allianz Arena	Munich	Bayern Munich	0–3	71,000	—	16	30	
34	18 May 2013	15:30	SGL arena	Augsburg	Greuther Fürth	3–1	30,660	Werner 30'; Callsen-Bracker 55'; Ji 74'	15	33	

==== League table ====
===== Overall league table =====
Pos	Team	Pld	W	D	L	GF	GA	GD	Pts	Qualification or relegation
13	Mainz 05	34	10	12	12	42	44	−2	42	
14	Werder Bremen	34	8	10	16	50	66	−16	34	
15	FC Augsburg	34	8	9	17	33	51	−18	33	
16	1899 Hoffenheim (O)	34	8	7	19	42	67	−25	31	Qualification for the relegation play-offs
17	Fortuna Düsseldorf (R)	34	7	9	18	39	57	−18	30	Relegation to 2. Bundesliga

Source: Bundesliga.de, kicker.de
Rules for classification: 1) points; 2) goal difference; 3) number of goals scored.
(O) Play-off winners; (R) Relegated

===== League summary table =====
Overall								Home						Away					
Pld	W	D	L	GF	GA	GD	Pts	W	D	L	GF	GA	GD	W	D	L	GF	GA	GD
34	8	9	17	33	51	−18	33	5	5	7	19	22	−3	3	4	10	14	29	−15

Last updated: 18 May 2013.
Source: kicker.de

=== DFB-Pokal ===
Round	Date	Time	Venue	City	Opponent	Result^{1}	Attendance	FC Augsburg goalscorers	Source
1	17 August 212	20:00	Jadestadion	Wilhelmshaven	SV Wilhelmshaven	2–0	4,098	Bancé 28'; Musona 78'	
2	30 September 2012	19:00	Preußenstadion	Münster	Preußen Münster	1–0	16,269	Callsen-Bracker 69'	
3	18 December 2012	20:30	SGL arena	Augsburg	Bayern Munich	0–2	30,660	—	

== Squad information ==
=== Squad and statistics ===
==== Squad, appearances and goals ====
As of 1 August 2012

No.	Pos	Nat	Player	Total		Bundesliga		DFB-Pokal	
No.	Pos	Nat	Player	Apps	Goals	Apps	Goals	Apps	Goals
1	GK	(Germany) GER	Simon Jentzsch	2	0	2	0	0	0
27	GK	(Germany) GER	Ionnis Gelios	0	0	0	0	0	0
30	GK	(Morocco) MAR	Mohamed Amsif	2	0	2	0	0	0
2	DF	(Netherlands) NED	Paul Verhaegh	0	0	0	0	0	0
3	DF	(Sierra Leone) SLE	Gibril Sankoh	0	0	0	0	0	0
4	DF	(Germany) GER	Dominik Reinhardt	0	0	0	0	0	0
5	DF	(Estonia) EST	Ragnar Klavan	0	0	0	0	0	0
15	DF	(Germany) GER	Sebastian Langkamp	0	0	0	0	0	0
17	DF	(Canada) CAN	Marcel de Jong	0	0	0	0	0	0
19	DF	(Germany) GER	Matthias Ostrzolek	0	0	0	0	0	0
20	DF	(Germany) GER	Ronny Philp	0	0	0	0	0	0
6	MF	(Germany) GER	Kevin Vogt	0	0	0	0	0	0
7	MF	(South Korea) KOR	Ja-Cheol Koo	0	0	0	0	0	0
10	MF	(Germany) GER	Daniel Baier	0	0	0	0	0	0
11	MF	(Czech Republic) CZE	Milan Petržela	0	0	0	0	0	0
13	MF	(Germany) GER	Tobias Werner	0	0	0	0	0	0
14	MF	(Czech Republic) CZE	Jan Morávek	0	0	0	0	0	0
16	MF	(Germany) GER	Andreas Ottl	0	0	0	0	0	0
18	MF	(Germany) GER	Jan-Ingwer Callsen-Bracker	0	0	0	0	0	0
25	MF	(The Gambia) GAM	Dawda Bah	0	0	0	0	0	0
26	MF	(Netherlands) NED	Lorenzo Davids	0	0	0	0	0	0
29	MF	(Germany) GER	Moritz Nebel	0	0	0	0	0	0
31	MF	(Germany) GER	Marco Thiede	0	0	0	0	0	0
8	FW	(Zimbabwe) ZIM	Knowledge Musona	0	0	0	0	0	0
9	FW	(Germany) GER	Torsten Oehrl	0	0	0	0	0	0
22	FW	(France) FRA	Giovanni Sio	0	0	0	0	0	0
23	FW	(Burkina Faso) BFA	Aristide Bancé	0	0	0	0	0	0
27	FW	(South Korea) KOR	Ji Dong-Won	0	0	0	0	0	0
33	FW	(Germany) GER	Sascha Mölders	0	0	0	0	0	0
36	FW	(Germany) GER	Stephan Hain	0	0	0	0	0	0

== Notes ==
- 1.FC Augsburg goals listed first.
