= 2014–15 FC Augsburg season =

FC Augsburg
2014–15 season
- Chairman: Walther Seinsch
- Manager: Markus Weinzierl
- Stadium: SGL arena, Augsburg, Bavaria
- Bundesliga: 5th
- DFB-Pokal: First round
- Top goalscorer: League: Raúl Bobadilla (10); All: Raúl Bobadilla (10)
- Highest home attendance: 30,660
- Lowest home attendance: 27,090
- Average home league attendance: 29,163
Home colours	Away colours	Third colours

The 2014–15 FC Augsburg season was the 108th season in the football club's history and fourth consecutive season in the top flight of German football, the Bundesliga, having been promoted from the 2. Bundesliga in 2011. FC Augsburg also participated in the season's edition of the DFB-Pokal. It was the sixth season for FC Augsburg in the SGL arena.

Having finished fifth in Bundesliga, FC Augsburg also qualified for the UEFA Europa League for the first time in the club's history. They will enter at the group stage.

== First team squad ==
As of 1 September, 2014

Note: Flags indicate national team as defined under FIFA eligibility rules; some limited exceptions apply. Players may hold more than one non-FIFA nationality.

No.	Pos.	Nation	Player
1	GK	AUT	Alex Manninger
2	DF	NED	Paul Verhaegh (captain)
3	DF	GER	Ronny Philp
4	DF	GER	Dominik Reinhardt
5	DF	EST	Ragnar Klavan
7	MF	TUR	Halil Altıntop
8	MF	GER	Markus Feulner
9	FW	GER	Shawn Parker
10	MF	GER	Daniel Baier
11	MF	GER	Alexander Esswein
12	DF	GHA	Abdul Rahman Baba
13	MF	GER	Tobias Werner
14	MF	CZE	Jan Morávek
17	DF	CAN	Marcel de Jong
18	DF	GER	Jan-Ingwer Callsen-Bracker
20	DF	KOR	Hong Jeong-ho

No.	Pos.	Nation	Player
21	MF	GER	Dominik Kohr (on loan from Bayer Leverkusen)
23	FW	SLO	Tim Matavž
25	FW	ARG	Raúl Bobadilla
26	MF	GER	Erik Thommy
29	MF	GER	Marco Schuster
30	FW	BRA	Caiuby
31	FW	TUR	Arif Ekin
32	DF	GER	Raphael Framberger
33	FW	GER	Sascha Mölders
34	FW	SRB	Nikola Đurđić
35	GK	SUI	Marwin Hitz
36	MF	ITA	Max Reinthaler
37	GK	GRE	Ioannis Gelios
39	DF	GER	Maik Uhde
40	DF	GER	Tim Rieder

=== Out on loan ===
Note: Flags indicate national team as defined under FIFA eligibility rules; some limited exceptions apply. Players may hold more than one non-FIFA nationality.

No.	Pos.	Nation	Player
—	FW	GER	Mathias Fetsch (at Dynamo Dresden until 30 June 2015)

== Transfers ==
=== In ===
Note: Flags indicate national team as defined under FIFA eligibility rules; some limited exceptions apply. Players may hold more than one non-FIFA nationality.

No.	Pos.	Nation	Player
8	MF	GER	Markus Feulner (from 1. FC Nürnberg)
9	FW	GER	Shawn Parker (from Mainz 05)
12	DF	GHA	Abdul Rahman Baba (from Greuther Fürth)
23	FW	SLO	Tim Matavž (from PSV)
30	FW	BRA	Caiuby (from FC Ingolstadt)
34	FW	SRB	Nikola Đurđić (from Greuther Fürth)
36	MF	ITA	Max Reinthaler (from Rydaholms)

=== Out ===
Note: Flags indicate national team as defined under FIFA eligibility rules; some limited exceptions apply. Players may hold more than one non-FIFA nationality.

No.	Pos.	Nation	Player
—	DF	GER	Matthias Ostrzolek (at Hamburger SV)
—	MF	GER	André Hahn (at Borussia Mönchengladbach)
—	FW	GER	Kevin Vogt (at 1. FC Köln)
—	MF	KOR	Dong-Won Ji (at Borussia Dortmund)
—	MF	MAR	Mohamed Amsif (at Union Berlin)
—	MF	GER	Bajram Nebihi (at Union Berlin)
—	MF	BFA	Aristide Bancé (at HJK Helsinki)

== Competitions ==
=== Bundesliga ===
==== League table ====
Pos	Team	Pld	W	D	L	GF	GA	GD	Pts	Qualification or relegation
3	Borussia Mönchengladbach	34	19	9	6	53	26	+27	66	Qualification for the Champions League group stage
4	Bayer Leverkusen	34	17	10	7	62	37	+25	61	Qualification for the Champions League play-off round
5	FC Augsburg	34	15	4	15	43	43	0	49	Qualification for the Europa League group stage (Note: Since the winners of the 2014–15 DFB-Pokal, VfL Wolfsburg, qualified for the Champions League based on league position, the Europa League group stage spot was passed to the sixth-placed team, Schalke 04; and the Europa League third qualifying round spot was passed to the seventh-placed team, Borussia Dortmund.)
6	Schalke 04	34	13	9	12	42	40	+2	48	Qualification for the Europa League group stage
7	Borussia Dortmund	34	13	7	14	47	42	+5	46	Qualification for the Europa League third qualifying round

Source: DFB
Rules for classification: 1) points; 2) goal difference; 3) number of goals scored

==== Results summary ====
Overall								Home						Away					
Pld	W	D	L	GF	GA	GD	Pts	W	D	L	GF	GA	GD	W	D	L	GF	GA	GD
34	15	4	15	43	43	0	49	9	4	4	28	21	+7	6	0	11	15	22	−7

Last updated: 16 May 2015.
Source: Competitive matches

==== Results by round ====
Round	1	2	3	4	5	6	7	8	9	10	11	12	13	14	15	16	17	18	19	20	21	22	23	24	25	26	27	28	29	30	31	32	33	34
Ground	A	H	A	H	A	H	A	A	H	A	H	A	H	A	H	A	H	H	A	H	A	H	A	H	H	A	H	A	H	A	H	A	H	A
Result	L	L	W	W	L	W	L	L	W	L	W	W	W	W	L	L	W	W	W	D	L	D	L	W	L	L	D	L	W	L	D	W		
Position	17	18	12	9	11	8	10	12	9	10	7	6	4	3	4	6	6	5	4	4	5	5	6	6	6	6	6	6	6	6	6	5		

Updated to match(es) played on 9 May 2015. Source: Competitive matches
A = Away; H = Home; W = Win; D = Draw; L = Loss

==== Matches ====
23 August 2014 1	1899 Hoffenheim	2–0	FC Augsburg	Sinsheim
15:30 CEST (UTC+02:00)	Volland (yellow card) 15'; Szalai 33'; Elyounoussi 35'; Polanski (yellow card) 77'	Report	Callsen-Bracker (yellow card) 18'; Baier (yellow card) 47'; Werner (yellow card) 53'	Stadium: Rhein-Neckar Arena; Attendance: 23,792; Referee: Tobias Stieler

29 August 2014 2	FC Augsburg	2–3	Borussia Dortmund	Augsburg
20:30 CEST (UTC+02:00)	Werner (yellow card) 43'; Verhaegh (yellow card) 43'; Bobadilla 82'; Matavž 89'	Report	Reus 11'; Sokratis 14'; Jojić (yellow card) 54'; Subotić (yellow card) 70'; Bender (yellow card) 73'; Ramos 78'	Stadium: SGL arena Attendance: 30,660; Referee: Knut Kircher

14 September 2014 3	Eintracht Frankfurt	0–1	FC Augsburg	Frankfurt
15:30 CEST (UTC+02:00)	Bamba (yellow card) 21'; Hasebe (yellow card) 27'; Zambrano (yellow card) 69'	Report	Bobadilla 49'; Kohr (yellow card) 51'; Vergaegh (yellow card) 62'; Werner (yellow card) 77'; Feulner (yellow card) 90+3'	Stadium: Commerzbank-Arena; Attendance: 43,500; Referee: Manuel Gräfe

20 September 2014 4	FC Augsburg	4–2	Werder Bremen	Augsburg
15:30 CEST (UTC+02:00)	Baier 14'; Kohr (yellow card) 15'; Verhaegh 45+3' (pen.); Werner 77'; Matavž 90+3'	Report	Selke 3'; García (yellow card) 36'; Elia (yellow card) 40'; Bartels (yellow card) 45+2'; Di Santo 56' (pen.), (yellow card) 88'	Stadium: SGL arena Attendance: 29,044; Referee: Marco Fritz

24 September 2014 5	Bayer Leverkusen	1–0	FC Augsburg	Leverkusen
20:00 CEST (UTC+02:00)	Jedvaj (yellow card) 1'; Son 33'; Reinartz (yellow card) 41'; Spahić (yellow card) 51'	Report	Kohr (yellow card) 39'; Caiuby (yellow card) 90+3'	Stadium: BayArena; Attendance: 23,081; Referee: Guido Winkmann

28 September 2014 6	FC Augsburg	1–0	Hertha BSC	Augsburg
15:30 CEST (UTC+02:00)	Verhaegh 27' (pen.); Đurđić (yellow card) 32'; Kohr (yellow card) 75'	Report	Kraft (yellow card) 26'; Hosogai (yellow card) 36'; Heitinga (yellow card) 59'; Ronny (yellow card) 62'	Stadium: SGL arena Attendance: 28,532; Referee: Bastian Dankert

5 October 2014 7	VfL Wolfsburg	1–0	FC Augsburg	Wolfsburg
15:30 CEST (UTC+02:00)	Naldo 58'	Report	Werner (yellow card) 32'; Altıntop (yellow card) 90'	Stadium: Volkswagen Arena; Attendance: 25,734; Referee: Markus Schmidt

18 October 2014 8	Mainz 05	2–1	FC Augsburg	Mainz
15:30 CEST (UTC+02:00)	Okazaki (yellow card) 18'; Hofmann 20'; Jairo 23'; Allagui (yellow card) 64'; Díaz (yellow card) 69'	Report	Bobadilla (yellow card) 63'; Werner 78', (yellow card) 82'	Stadium: Coface Arena; Attendance: 27,687; Referee: Tobias Stieler

25 October 2014 9	FC Augsburg	2–0	SC Freiburg	Augsburg
15:30 CEST (UTC+02:00)	Verhaegh 11' (pen.), (yellow card) 25'; Callsen-Bracker (yellow card) 38'; Altıntop 66'; Baier (yellow card) 90+2'	Report	Krmaš (yellow card) 10'	Stadium: SGL arena Attendance: 28,324; Referee: Marco Fritz

31 October 2014 10	Schalke 04	1–0	FC Augsburg	Gelsenkirchen
20:30 CET (UTC+01:00)	Huntelaar 37'; Kirchhoff (yellow card) 66'; Aogo (yellow card) 84'	Report	Kohr (yellow card) 69'; Caiuby (yellow card) 86'	Stadium: Veltins-Arena; Attendance: 60,954; Referee: Christian Dingert

8 November 2014 11	FC Augsburg	3–0	SC Paderborn	Augsburg
15:30 CET (UTC+01:00)	Werner 7', 47'; Feulner (yellow card) 31'; Callsen-Bracker 68'; Baba (yellow card) 89'	Report	Bakalorz (yellow card) 32'; Stoppelkamp (yellow card) 39'; Ziegler (yellow card) 45'	Stadium: SGL arena Attendance: 27,755; Referee: Daniel Siebert

23 November 2014 12	VfB Stuttgart	0–1	FC Augsburg	Stuttgart
17:30 CET (UTC+01:00)	Schwaab (yellow card) 21' (yellow-red card) 27'; Romeu (yellow card) 52'; Leitner (yellow card) 64'	Report	Werner (yellow card) 31'; Feulner (yellow card) 58'; Verhaegh 72' (pen.), (yellow card) 75'	Stadium: Mercedes-Benz Arena; Attendance: 48,200; Referee: Thorsten Kinhöfer

29 November 2014 13	FC Augsburg	3–1	Hamburger SV	Augsburg
15:30 CET (UTC+01:00)	Altıntop 50'; Bobadilla 62'; Verhaegh 70' (pen.); Baba (yellow card) 89'	Report	Van der Vaart 45+1'; Ostrzolek (yellow card) 49'; Götz (yellow card) 69'; Cléber (yellow card) 70'; Green (yellow card) 90+1'	Stadium: SGL arena Attendance: 30,321; Referee: Jochen Drees

6 December 2014 14	1. FC Köln	1–2	FC Augsburg	Cologne
15:30 CET (UTC+01:00)	Ujah 13'	Report	Kohr (yellow card) 37'; Đurđić 53'; Esswein 90'	Stadium: RheinEnergieStadion; Attendance: 48,500; Referee: Tobias Welz

13 December 2014 15	FC Augsburg	0–4	Bayern Munich	Augsburg
15:30 CET (UTC+01:00)		Report	Benatia 58'; Robben 59', 71'; Lewandowski 68'	Stadium: SGL arena Attendance: 30,660; Referee: Tobias Stieler

16 December 2014 16	Hannover 96	2–0	FC Augsburg	Hanover
20:00 CET (UTC+01:00)	Sané 20'; Joselu 55' (pen.)	Report	Bobadilla (yellow card) 67'; Baier (yellow card) 71'; Klavan (yellow card) 88'	Stadium: Niedersachsenstadion; Attendance: 30,800; Referee: Christian Dingert

20 December 2014 17	FC Augsburg	2–1	Borussia Mönchengladbach	Augsburg
15:30 CET (UTC+01:00)	Callsen-Bracker (yellow card) 2'; Feulner 20'; Bobadilla 51'; Baba (yellow card) 75'; Kohr (yellow card) 89'	Report	Kruse 3' (pen.); Traoré (yellow card) 65'; Kramer (yellow card) 79'	Stadium: SGL arena Attendance: 30,660; Referee: Bastian Dankert

1 February 2015 18	FC Augsburg	3–1	1899 Hoffenheim	Augsburg
17:30 CET (UTC+01:00)	Feulner (yellow card) 17'; Altıntop 39'; Werner 42'; Højbjerg (yellow card) 43'; Bobadilla 90+3'	Report	Abraham (yellow card) 41'; Firmino 45', (yellow card) 83'; Szalai (yellow card) 61'	Stadium: SGL arena Attendance: 27,090; Referee: Florian Meyer

4 February 2015 19	Borussia Dortmund	0–1	FC Augsburg	Dortmund
20:00 CET (UTC+01:00)		Report	Werner (yellow card) 23'; Bobadilla 50'; Janker (red card) 64'	Stadium: Westfalenstadion; Attendance: 80,667; Referee: Marco Fritz

8 February 2015 20	FC Augsburg	2–2	Eintracht Frankfurt	Augsburg
17:30 CET (UTC+01:00)	Klavan 7'; Callsen-Bracker (yellow card) 23'; Bobadilla 37'; Kohr (yellow card) 57'; Højbjerg (yellow card) 87'	Report	Seferovic (yellow card) 15'; Zambrano (yellow card) 34'; Aigner 45+2'; Meier 70'; Chandler (yellow card) 74'	Stadium: SGL arena Attendance: 27,122; Referee: Knut Kircher

14 February 2015 21	Werder Bremen	3–2	FC Augsburg	Bremen
15:30 CET (UTC+01:00)	Lukimya-Mulongoti 16'; Di Santo 23' (pen.), (yellow card) 26'; Gebre Selassie 45'; Ayçiçek (yellow card) 72'	Report	Klavan 21'; Bobadilla (yellow card) 25'; Werner 79'; Feulner (yellow card) 90+4'	Stadium: Weserstadion; Attendance: 39,746; Referee: Christian Dingert

21 February 2015 22	FC Augsburg	2–2	Bayer Leverkusen	Augsburg
15:30 CET (UTC+01:00)	Caiuby 59'; Hitz 90+4'	Report	Drmić 8'; Papadopoulos (yellow card) 44'; Bellarabi (yellow card) 75'; Reinartz 84'; Hilbert (yellow card) 90'	Stadium: SGL arena Attendance: 28,154; Referee: Tobias Welz

28 February 2015 23	Hertha BSC	1–0	FC Augsburg	Berlin
15:30 CET (UTC+01:00)	Skjelbred (yellow card) 68'; Niemeyer (yellow card) 76'; Langkamp (yellow card) 83'; Kalou 88'	Report	Baier (yellow card) 36'; Caiuby (yellow card) 70'; Feulner (yellow card) 74'; Bobadilla (yellow card) 76'	Stadium: Olympiastadion; Attendance: 36,015; Referee: Tobias Stieler

7 March 2015 24	FC Augsburg	1–0	VfL Wolfsburg	Augsburg
15:30 CET (UTC+01:00)	Hitz (yellow card) 12'; Kohr 63'	Report	Naldo (yellow card) 90+2'	Stadium: SGL arena Attendance: 28,721; Referee: Manuel Gräfe

14 March 2015 25	FC Augsburg	0–2	Mainz 05	Augsburg
15:30 CET (UTC+01:00)		Report	Okazaki 32'; Koo 89'	Stadium: SGL arena Attendance: 28,359; Referee: Knut Kircher

21 March 2015 26	SC Freiburg	2–0	FC Augsburg	Freiburg im Breisgau
15:30 CET (UTC+01:00)	Riether (yellow card) 65'; Schmid 71'; Petersen 84'	Report		Stadium: Dreisamstadion; Attendance: 23,700; Referee: Felix Zwayer

5 April 2015 27	FC Augsburg	0–0	Schalke 04	Augsburg
15:30 CEST (UTC+02:00)	Hong (yellow card) 24'; Kohr (yellow card) 46'; Werner (yellow card) 55'	Report	Nastasić (yellow card) 26'; Matip (yellow card) 34'; Höwedes (yellow card) 66'	Stadium: SGL arena Attendance: 30,660; Referee: Florian Meyer

11 April 2015 28	SC Paderborn	2–1	FC Augsburg	Paderborn
15:30 CEST (UTC+02:00)	Hünemeier (yellow card) 16'; Kachunga 48'; Lakić 60'	Report	Højbjerg 52', (yellow card) 84'; Parker (yellow card) 82'	Stadium: Benteler Arena; Attendance: 14,446; Referee: Tobias Stieler

18 April 2015 29	FC Augsburg	2–0	VfB Stuttgart	Augsburg
18:30 CEST (UTC+02:00)	Werner 7'; Bobadilla 73'; Feulner (yellow card) 83'; Baba (yellow card) 83'	Report	Ginczek 22'; Hloušek (yellow card) 36'; Serey Dié (yellow card) 40'; Schwaab (yellow card) 67'; Maxim (yellow card) 83'	Stadium: SGL arena Attendance: 30,660; Referee: Thorsten Kinhöfer

25 April 2015 30	Hamburger SV	3–2	FC Augsburg	Hamburg
15:30 CEST (UTC+02:00)	Olić 11'; Lasogga 19', 71', (yellow card) 75'; Van der Vaart (yellow card) 26'; Kačar (yellow card) 67'	Report	Bobadilla 25'; Werner 69'; Ji (yellow card) 78'	Stadium: Volksparkstadion; Attendance: 51,321; Referee: Tobias Welz

2 May 2015 31	FC Augsburg	0–0	1. FC Köln	Augsburg
15:30 CEST (UTC+02:00)		Report		Stadium: SGL arena Attendance: 29,158; Referee: Marco Fritz

9 May 2015 32	Bayern Munich	0–1	FC Augsburg	Munich
15:30 CEST (UTC+02:00)	Dante (yellow card) 12'; Reina (red card) 13'; Rafinha (yellow card) 90+2'	Report	Bobadilla 71'; Hong (yellow card) 77'	Stadium: Allianz Arena; Attendance: 75,000; Referee: Sascha Stegemann

16 May 2015 33	FC Augsburg	1–2	Hannover 96	Augsburg
15:30 CEST (UTC+02:00)	Verhaegh 30' (pen.), (yellow card) 34' (yellow-red card) 90'; Mölders (yellow card) 89'; Bobadilla (red card) 90+5'	Report	Stindl 24', 54', (yellow card) 53'; Sakai (yellow card) 28' (yellow-red card) 77'; Zieler (yellow card) 29'; Gülselam (yellow card) 72'; Sané (yellow card) 90+4'	Stadium: SGL arena Attendance: 29,899; Referee: Felix Zwayer

23 May 2015 34	Borussia Mönchengladbach	1–3	FC Augsburg	Mönchengladbach
15:30 CEST (UTC+02:00)	Xhaka (yellow card) 21'; Herrmann (yellow card) 26'; Raffael 36'; Nordtveit (red card) 61'; Wendt (yellow card) 85'; Kruse (yellow card) 90+4'	Report	Højbjerg (yellow card) 35', (goal) 72'; Kohr (yellow card) 45'; Matavž 77'; Mölders 90+5'	Stadium: Borussia-Park; Attendance: 54,010; Referee: Michael Weiner

=== DFB-Pokal ===
17 August 2014 Round 1	1. FC Magdeburg	1–0	FC Augsburg	Magdeburg
18:30 CEST (UTC+02:00)	Beck 57'; Fuchs (yellow card) 88'; Brandt (yellow card) 90'	Report	Callsen-Bracker (yellow card) 69'; Klavan (yellow card) 81'	Stadium: MDCC-Arena; Attendance: 17,854; Referee: Robert Kempter
