= Daniel Baier =

German footballer

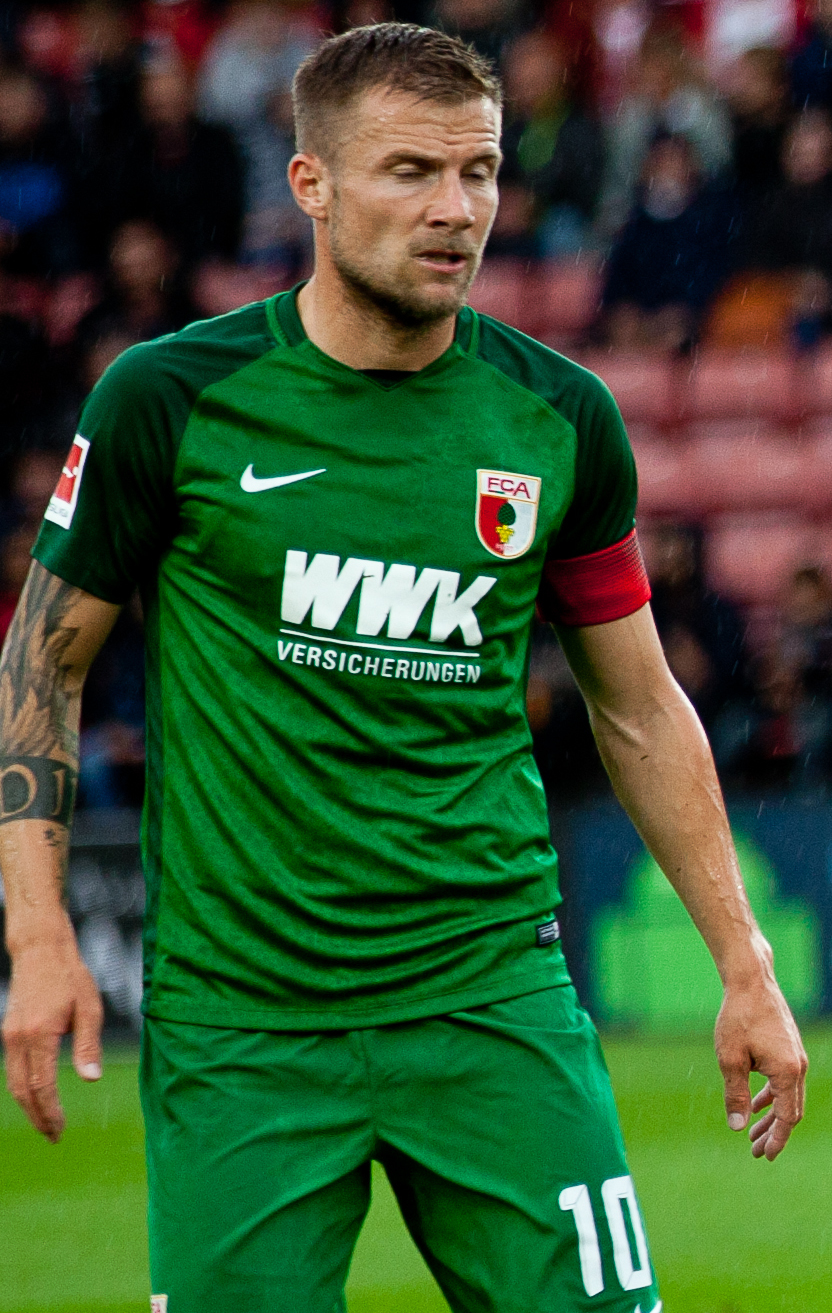
- Baier with Augsburg in 2017

Personal information
- Date of birth: 18 May 1984 (age 42)
- Place of birth: Cologne, West Germany
- Height: 1.74 m (5 ft 9 in)
- Position: Midfielder

Team information
- Current team: RB Leipzig (sports coordinator)

Youth career
- 1988–1992: Teutonia Obernau
- 1992–1998: TSV Mainaschaff
- 1998–1999: Viktoria Aschaffenburg
- 1999–2003: 1860 Munich

Senior career*
Years	Team	Apps	(Gls)
2003–2007	1860 Munich	107	(3)
2007–2010	VfL Wolfsburg	16	(0)
2008	VfL Wolfsburg II	1	(1)
2008–2009	→ FC Augsburg (loan)	23	(1)
2010–2020	FC Augsburg	324	(8)
Total		470	(12)

International career
2003	Germany U19	2	(0)
2004	Germany U20	3	(1)
2005	Germany U21	1	(0)
- * Club domestic league appearances and goals

Daniel Baier (German pronunciation: [ˈdaːni̯eːl ˈbaɪɐ, -ni̯ɛl -]; born 18 May 1984) is a German former professional footballer who played as a midfielder. He is currently the sports coordinator at Bundesliga club RB Leipzig.

Baier is a legend of FC Augsburg who spent his entire career in Germany. Dieter Eilts has said about Baier: "Daniel is an individual talent. He plays a deadly passing game. If he continues in this way, he has a big future."

== Career ==
Born in Cologne, Baier first played for the youth team of TSV 1860 Munich. He generally plays an offensive midfield role. He made his league debut against 1. FC Köln on 13 September 2003.

=== FC Augsburg ===
On 31 January 2010, he left VfL Wolfsburg and returned to FC Augsburg.

On 20 September 2017, Baier was fined €20,000 and suspended for one Bundesliga game, as he made a masturbation gesture at RB Leipzig coach Ralph Hasenhüttl during the 1–0 victory against Leipzig the day before.

On 13 January 2020, Baier signed a one and a half year contract with the club.

After 355 competitive appearances for FC Augsburg, Baier was released by the club on 23 July 2020. He announced his retirement from professional football on 9 September 2020.

== International career ==
He has played in the Germany national U20 team, his debut coming on 7 October 2005 against Wales.

== Coaching career ==
On 16 January 2025, Baier was announced as sports coordinator with RB Leipzig, and will head the scouting, data and career departments. He had previously worked as a scout for FC Augsburg, VfL Wolfsburg, and Bayern Munich.

== Personal life ==
His father Jürgen was also a footballer who played for Darmstadt 98. His brother Benjamin, who is also a midfielder, currently plays for Viktoria Aschaffenburg.

== Career statistics ==
Appearances and goals by club, season and competition
Club	Season	League			DFB-Pokal		Other		Total	
Club	Season	Division	Apps	Goals	Apps	Goals	Apps	Goals	Apps	Goals
1860 Munich	2003–04	Bundesliga	12	0	2	0	—		14	0
1860 Munich	2004–05	2. Bundesliga	30	1	2	0	—		32	1
1860 Munich	2005–06	2. Bundesliga	31	0	4	0	—		35	0
1860 Munich	2006–07	2. Bundesliga	34	2	1	0	—		35	2
1860 Munich	Total		107	3	9	0	—		116	3
VfL Wolfsburg	2007–08	Bundesliga	15	0	1	0	—		16	0
VfL Wolfsburg	2009–10	Bundesliga	1	0	1	0	0	0	2	0
VfL Wolfsburg	Total		16	0	2	0	0	0	18	0
VfL Wolfsburg II	2008–09	Regionalliga Nord	1	1	—		—		1	1
FC Augsburg	2008–09 (loan)	2. Bundesliga	23	1	1	0	—		24	1
FC Augsburg	2009–10	2. Bundesliga	10	0	1	0	2 (Note: Appearances in the 2. Bundesliga promotion play-offs)	0	13	0
FC Augsburg	2010–11	2. Bundesliga	17	1	2	0	—		19	1
FC Augsburg	2011–12	Bundesliga	33	0	2	0	—		35	0
FC Augsburg	2012–13	Bundesliga	33	2	3	0	—		36	2
FC Augsburg	2013–14	Bundesliga	34	0	3	0	—		37	0
FC Augsburg	2014–15	Bundesliga	34	1	1	0	—		35	1
FC Augsburg	2015–16	Bundesliga	28	1	3	0	6 (Note: Appearances in UEFA Europa League)	0	37	1
FC Augsburg	2016–17	Bundesliga	27	1	2	0	—		29	1
FC Augsburg	2017–18	Bundesliga	29	0	1	0	—		30	0
FC Augsburg	2018–19	Bundesliga	33	0	3	0	—		36	0
FC Augsburg	2019–20	Bundesliga	23	1	1	0	—		24	1
FC Augsburg	Total		324	8	23	0	8	0	355	8
Career total			449	12	34	0	8	0	490	12
