= Jan Morávek =

Czech footballer (born 1989)

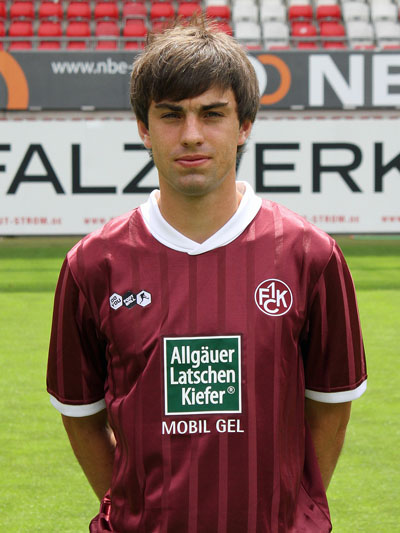

Personal information
- Full name: Jan Morávek
- Date of birth: 1 November 1989 (age 37)
- Place of birth: Prague, Czechoslovakia
- Height: 1.80 m (5 ft 11 in)
- Position: Attacking midfielder

Youth career
- 1995–2007: Bohemians 1905

Senior career*
Years	Team	Apps	(Gls)
2007–2009	Bohemians 1905	39	(11)
2009–2012	Schalke 04	13	(2)
2010–2011	→ 1. FC Kaiserslautern (loan)	29	(5)
2012	→ FC Augsburg (loan)	3	(0)
2012–2022	FC Augsburg	123	(2)
2022–2023	Bohemians 1905	5	(0)

International career^{‡}
2007–2008	Czech Republic U19	11	(3)
2009	Czech Republic U20	3	(0)
2008–2011	Czech Republic U21	9	(0)
2010–	Czech Republic	3	(0)
- * Club domestic league appearances and goals as of 25 May 2023 ‡ National team caps and goals as of 14 July 2011

Jan Morávek (born 1 November 1989) is a Czech footballer who played as an attacking midfielder for Bohemians 1905 and the Czech Republic national team.

== Career ==
=== Club career ===
Morávek began his career 1995 with Bohemians 1905 and was promoted to the first team in 2006, playing his debut on 8 June 2007 against 1. HFK Olomouc. He played his first game for Bohemians 1905 in the Czech First League on 12 November 2007 against Sparta Prague.

After a successful tryout with German club Schalke 04 in November 2008, he signed a four-year contract on 24 March 2009. He joined the club on 1 July 2009 for a fee of €2.5 million. In summer 2010, Schalke loaned Morávek to 1. FC Kaiserslautern until the end of the season. After half a season back with Schalke, he signed a six-month loan with FC Augsburg in January 2012.

=== International ===
Morávek played six matches and scored two goals for the Czech Republic U18 national team. He was a member of the Czech Republic U21 national team where he has played nine matches.

On 3 March 2010, Morávek made his debut for the senior side of his country in the 0–1 loss against Scotland in a friendly match after coming on as a substitute for Jaroslav Plašil in the second half of the game.

== Career statistics ==
As of match played 13 January 2018

Appearances and goals by club, season and competition
Club	Season	League			National Cup		Europe		Other		Total	
Club	Season	Division	Apps	Goals	Apps	Goals	Apps	Goals	Apps	Goals	Apps	Goals
Bohemians 1905	2006–07	Druhá Liga	1	1	0	0	–		0	0	1	1
Bohemians 1905	2007–08	Prvni Liga	16	3	0	0	–		0	0	16	3
Bohemians 1905	2008–09	Druhá Liga	23	8	0	0	–		0	0	23	8
Bohemians 1905	Total		40	12	0	0	0	0	0	0	40	12
Schalke 04	2009–10	Bundesliga	7	2	0	0	–		0	0	7	2
Schalke 04	2011–12	Bundesliga	6	0	2	0	4 (Note: Appearances in the Europa League)	0	1 (Note: Appearance in the DFB-Supercup)	0	13	0
Schalke 04	Total		13	2	2	0	4	0	1	0	20	2
Schalke 04 II	2010–11	Regionalliga West	1	0	–		–		0	0	1	0
Kaiserslautern (loan)	2010–11	Bundesliga	29	5	4	0	–		0	0	33	5
Augsburg (loan)	2011–12	Bundesliga	3	0	–		–		0	0	3	0
Augsburg	2012–13	Bundesliga	21	1	2	0	–		0	0	23	1
Augsburg	2013–14	Bundesliga	16	0	1	0	–		0	0	17	0
Augsburg	2014–15	Bundesliga	0	0	0	0	–		0	0	0	0
Augsburg	2015–16	Bundesliga	11	1	1	0	1	0	0	0	13	1
Augsburg	2016–17	Bundesliga	13	0	0	0	–		0	0	13	0
Augsburg	2017–18	Bundesliga	5	0	0	0	–		0	0	5	0
Augsburg	Total		66	2	4	0	1	0	0	0	71	2
Augsburg II	2015–16	Regionalliga Bayern	2	2	–		–		0	0	2	2
Career total			154	23	10	0	5	0	1	0	170	23

== Honours ==
=== Club ===
Schalke 04

- DFL-Supercup: 2011

=== International ===
Czech Republic U21

- UEFA European Under-21 Championship bronze: 2011
