= Marcel de Jong =

Canadian soccer player (born 1986)

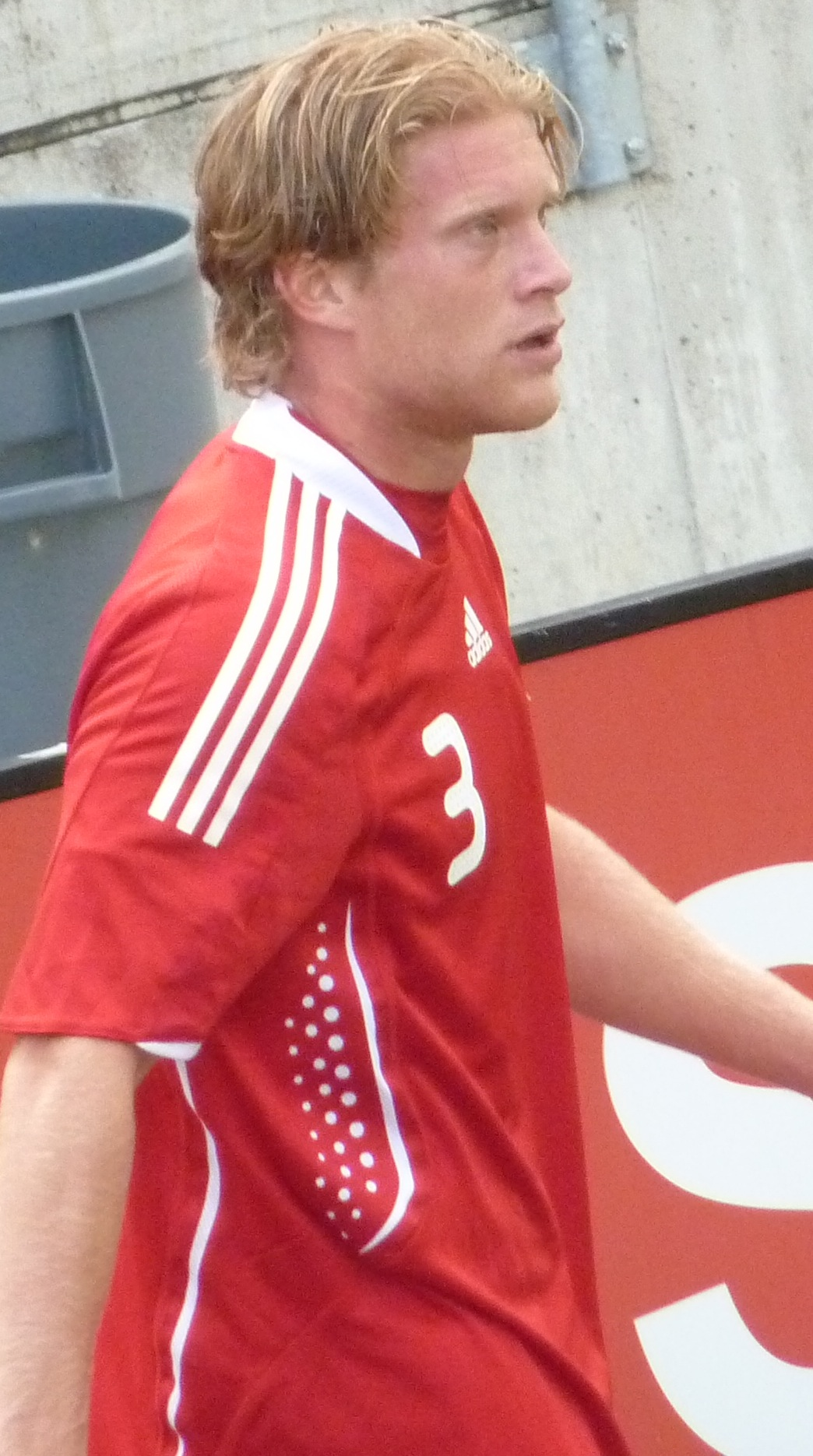
- De Jong playing for Canada in 2010

Personal information
- Full name: Marcel de Jong
- Date of birth: 15 October 1986 (age 40)
- Place of birth: Newmarket, Ontario, Canada
- Height: 1.75 m (5 ft 9 in)
- Positions: Left-back; left midfielder

Youth career
- De Valk
- 1996–2004: PSV

Senior career*
Years	Team	Apps	(Gls)
2004–2006	Helmond Sport	50	(6)
2006–2010	Roda JC	115	(3)
2010–2015	FC Augsburg	68	(5)
2015	Sporting Kansas City	13	(1)
2016	Ottawa Fury	6	(2)
2016–2018	Vancouver Whitecaps FC	39	(0)
2019–2020	Pacific FC	9	(0)
Total		300	(17)

International career
2003	Canada U17	5	(0)
2004–2005	Canada U20	14	(1)
2007–2018	Canada	56	(3)
- * Club domestic league appearances and goals

Marcel de Jong (English: /mɑːrˈsɛl də ˈjɒŋ/ mar-SEL də YONG, Dutch: [mɑrˈsɛl də ˈjɔŋ]; born 15 October 1986) is a Canadian former professional soccer player who played as a left-back.

== Club career ==
=== Early career ===
De Jong played for amateur side De Valk and joined the PSV Eindhoven youth academy in 1996. He started his professional career with Dutch Eerste Divisie side Helmond Sport and joined Roda JC in the summer of 2006.

=== FC Augsburg ===
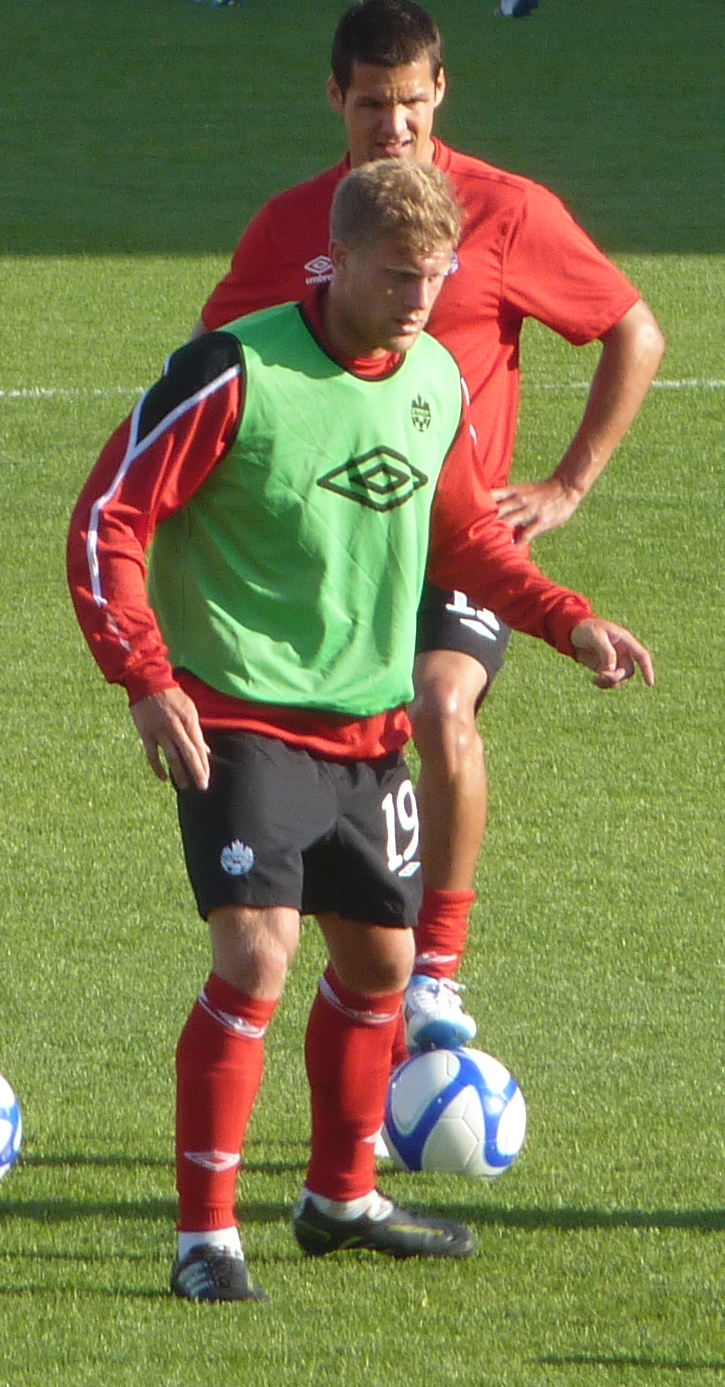
De Jong warming up before a match against Ecuador at BMO Field on 1 June 2011 in front of Josh Simpson.

After four years with Roda JC, de Jong signed with German club FC Augsburg on 21 May 2010. Marcel scored his first goal for the second division German side on 12 September 2010 versus VfL Bochum at the Ruhrstadion. They won this away fixture 2–0 in which de Jong also assisted the other goal from teammate Michael Thurk. De Jong scored his second goal of the season several months later on 4 February 2011 in a 2–0 away win versus VfL Osnabrück. De Jong in his first season with Augsburg started 24 league games and helped take the team to finish second in 2. Bundesliga securing automatic promotion to top flight soccer, finishing several points behind Hertha BSC.

De Jong made his Bundesliga debut in the first game of the 2011–12 season on 6 August 2011 against SC Freiburg; the game ended in a 2–2 home draw. On 4 October 2011, Marcel de Jong suffered a knee injury that would keep him out of action for two months. He returned to action as an unused substitute on 4 December 2011 during a 3–1 defeat to Schalke 04. De Jong made his full return to the team the following week against Borussia Mönchengladbach; starting the game, he helped earn the team only their third victory of the campaign, winning 1–0. De Jong scored his first Bundesliga goal on 28 January 2012 against 1. FC Kaiserslautern, the game ended in a 2–2 home draw. De Jong sustained an ankle injury in an early February draw against 1. FC Nürnberg, forcing him to have season-ending surgery on the ligaments.

De Jong made his return from his injury 1 September 2012 in a 3–1 defeat to Schalke 04. He scored his first goal of the season on 27 April 2013 against VfB Stuttgart in a 3–0 victory, de Jong came on as a sub and scored a minute after coming on. Unsatisfied with his role as a reserve in the 2014–15 season, De Jong and Augsburg agreed to terminate his contract in January 2015.

=== Sporting Kansas City ===
After an extended trial, de Jong signed with Sporting Kansas City ahead of the 2015 MLS season. He made his debut against FC Dallas on 14 March. On 1 March 2016, Sporting KC announced the club had terminated its contract with De Jong by mutual consent.

=== Ottawa Fury ===
The day after being released by Sporting KC, de Jong signed with NASL club Ottawa Fury, joining fellow Canadian international teammate Julian de Guzman.

After a good Spring season with Ottawa, de Jong had stated in interviews that he and his family "liked it here" (in Ottawa) and that he wanted to stay despite interest from multiple other clubs. However, when questioned by media, Fury manager Paul Dalglish stated that he was doubtful that the club would be able to afford de Jong. On 22 June 2016, Dalglish stated that he had made de Jong "his best possible offer" and that it was up to the player as to whether or not he would accept it and stay in Ottawa or sign elsewhere. On 30 June, the club stated in a preview for its Fall season opener that de Jong had not been re-signed.

=== Vancouver Whitecaps FC ===
On 11 July, Vancouver Whitecaps FC announced they had signed de Jong via Twitter.

On 4 February 2019, de Jong and Vancouver mutually agreed to terminate his contract with the club.

=== Pacific FC ===
On 19 February 2019, de Jong signed with Canadian Premier League club Pacific FC. The next month on 15 March, Pacific FC revealed de Jong suffered a ruptured Achilles tendon in training, sidelining him for the season. It was expected that de Jong would miss the entire 2019 Canadian Premier League season, but when the season was almost over, he was able to make his debut in the 66th minute of a 1–1 draw against the HFX Wanderers. De Jong re-signed with Pacific in October 2020 for the 2021 season.

On 5 March 2021, de Jong announced his retirement from soccer.

== International career ==
In the summer of 2005, De Jong played for the Canadian U-20 national team at the 2005 FIFA World Youth Championship in the Netherlands. On 26 September 2007, just before his 21st birthday, De Jong decided to play for the Canada national team instead of the Netherlands, reasoning that he would be more likely to earn a regular place in the Canada team than with the Netherlands.

He made his senior debut for Canada in a November 2007 friendly match against South Africa. De Jong scored his first goal for Canada in a 2–2 draw against Costa Rica on 10 July 2009. De Jong was selected for his second consecutive Gold Cup in May 2011, Canada failed to exit the group stage with a 1–1–1 record.

== Personal life ==
Born in Canada to Dutch parents, De Jong moved to the Netherlands at the age of five and did not return to Canada until he was selected by the Canada U17 national soccer team in 2003.

== Career statistics ==
=== Club ===
Appearances and goals by club, season and competition
Club	League	Season	League		Domestic Cup		Continental		Other		Total	
Club	League	Season	Apps	Goals	Apps	Goals	Apps	Goals	Apps	Goals	Apps	Goals
Helmond Sport	Eerste Divisie	2004–05	14	1	0	0	0	0	0	0	14	1
Helmond Sport	Eerste Divisie	2005–06	36	5	0	0	0	0	1 (Note: Appearances in Eerste Divisie relegation play-offs)	0	36	5
Helmond Sport	Total		50	6	0	0	0	0	1	0	51	6
Roda JC	Eredivisie	2006–07	27	0	1	0	0	0	1 (Note: Appearances in Eredivisie UEFA Cup / UEFA Europa League play-offs)	0	29	0
Roda JC	Eredivisie	2007–08	25	0	4	1	0	0	2	0	31	1
Roda JC	Eredivisie	2008–09	32	1	4	2	0	0	4 (Note: Appearances in Eredivisie relegation play-offs)	0	38	3
Roda JC	Eredivisie	2009–10	31	2	2	0	0	0	1	0	33	2
Roda JC	Total		115	3	11	3	0	0	8	0	134	6
FC Augsburg	2. Bundesliga	2010–11	27	3	0	0	0	0	0	0	27	3
FC Augsburg	Bundesliga	2011–12	12	1	2	0	0	0	0	0	12	1
FC Augsburg	Bundesliga	2012–13	20	1	1	0	0	0	0	0	20	1
FC Augsburg	Bundesliga	2013–14	8	0	1	0	0	0	0	0	8	0
FC Augsburg	Bundesliga	2014–15	1	0	1	0	0	0	0	0	1	0
FC Augsburg	Total		68	5	5	0	0	0	0	0	73	5
Sporting Kansas City	MLS	2015	13	1	2	0	0	0	0	0	15	1
Ottawa Fury	NASL	2016	6	2	3	0	0	0	0	0	9	2
Vancouver Whitecaps FC	MLS	2016	7	0	0	0	2	0	0	0	9	0
Vancouver Whitecaps FC	MLS	2017	13	0	2	0	2	0	3 (Note: Appearances in MLS play-offs)	0	20	0
Vancouver Whitecaps FC	MLS	2018	19	0	3	0	0	0	0	0	22	0
Vancouver Whitecaps FC	Total		39	0	5	0	4	0	3	0	51	0
Pacific FC	CPL	2019	2	0	0	0	0	0	0	0	2	0
Pacific FC	CPL	2020	7	0	0	0	0	0	0	0	7	0
Pacific FC	Total		9	0	0	0	0	0	0	0	9	0
Career total			300	17	26	3	4	0	12	0	342	20

=== International ===
Appearances and goals by national team and year
National team	Year	Apps	Goals
Canada	2007	1	0
Canada	2008	6	0
Canada	2009	6	1
Canada	2010	2	0
Canada	2011	2	0
Canada	2012	3	0
Canada	2013	9	0
Canada	2014	2	1
Canada	2015	10	1
Canada	2016	8	0
Canada	2017	6	0
Canada	2018	1	0
Total		56	3

Scores and results list Canada's goal tally first, score column indicates score after each de Jong goal.

List of international goals scored by Marcel de Jong
No.	Date	Venue	Cap	Opponent	Score	Result	Competition
1	10 July 2009	FIU Stadium, Miami, United States	11	Costa Rica	2–1	2–2	2009 CONCACAF Gold Cup
2	9 September 2014	BMO Field, Toronto, Canada	30	Jamaica	2–1	3–1	Friendly
3	13 October 2015	RFK Stadium, Washington, D.C., United States	39	Ghana	1–0	1–1	Friendly

== Honours ==
=== Club ===
FC Augsburg

- 2. Bundesliga Runner-up (Promotion to the Bundesliga): 2010–11

Sporting Kansas City

- Lamar Hunt U.S. Open Cup winner : 2015
