= Jan-Ingwer Callsen-Bracker =

German footballer

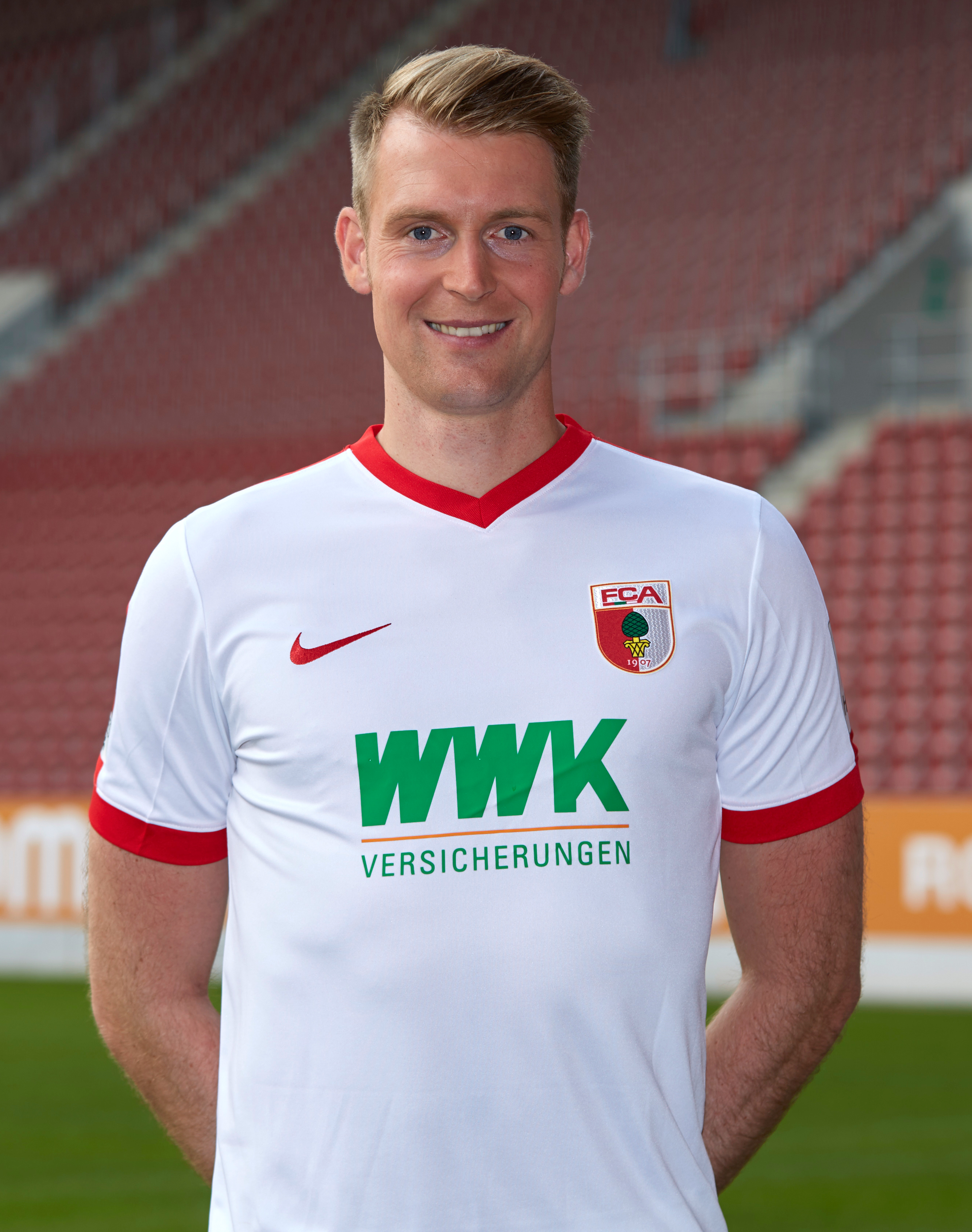
- Callsen-Bracker with FC Augsburg in 2016

Personal information
- Full name: Jan-Ingwer Callsen-Bracker
- Date of birth: 23 September 1984 (age 42)
- Place of birth: Schleswig, West Germany
- Height: 1.88 m (6 ft 2 in)
- Position: Centre-back

Youth career
- –1995: TSV Bollingstedt
- 1995–1998: SV Beuel 06
- 1998–2002: Bayer Leverkusen

Senior career*
Years	Team	Apps	(Gls)
2002–2007	Bayer Leverkusen II	41	(1)
2002–2008	Bayer Leverkusen	36	(2)
2008–2010	Borussia Mönchengladbach II	21	(0)
2008–2010	Borussia Mönchengladbach	11	(0)
2011–2019	FC Augsburg	137	(11)
2012–2019	FC Augsburg II	9	(1)
2018	→ 1. FC Kaiserslautern (loan)	12	(0)

International career
2004–2006	Germany U21	5	(0)
- * Club domestic league appearances and goals as of 20:36, 18 July 2019 (UTC)

Jan-Ingwer Callsen-Bracker (born 23 September 1984) is a German former professional footballer who played as a centre-back.

== Career ==
Callsen-Bracker joined TSV Bollingstedt and SV Beuel 06 before joining Bayer Leverkusen in 1998.

In 2011, Callsen-Bracker signed with FC Augsburg. In June 2017, he agreed to a one-year contract extension until 2018.

== Career statistics ==
As of 3 July 2018

Appearances and goals by club, season and competition
Club	Season	League			Cup^{1}		Continental^{2}		Other^{3}		Total		Ref.
Club	Season	Division	Apps	Goals	Apps	Goals	Apps	Goals	Apps	Goals	Apps	Goals	Ref.
Bayer; Leverkusen II	2002–03	Regionalliga Nord	9	0	—		—		—		9	0	
Bayer; Leverkusen II	2005–06	Regionalliga Nord	14	1	—		—		—		14	1	
Bayer; Leverkusen II	2006–07	Regionalliga Nord	16	0	—		—		—		16	0	
Bayer; Leverkusen II	2007–08	Oberliga Nordrhein	2	0	—		—		—		2	0	
Bayer; Leverkusen II	Totals		41	1	0	0	0	0	0	0	41	1	—
Bayer; Leverkusen	2002–03	Bundesliga	0	0	0	0	1	0	—		1	0	
Bayer; Leverkusen	2003–04	Bundesliga	1	0	0	0	—		—		1	0	
Bayer; Leverkusen	2004–05	Bundesliga	9	1	2	0	4	0	2	1	17	2	
Bayer; Leverkusen	2005–06	Bundesliga	1	0	0	0	—		1	0	2	0	
Bayer; Leverkusen	2006–07	Bundesliga	15	1	0	0	6	1	0	0	21	2	
Bayer; Leverkusen	2007–08	Bundesliga	10	0	0	0	5	0	—		15	0	
Bayer; Leverkusen	Totals		36	2	2	0	16	1	3	1	57	4	—
Borussia; Mönchengladbach	2008–09	Bundesliga	7	0	2	0	—		—		9	0	
Borussia; Mönchengladbach	2010–11	Bundesliga	4	0	1	0	—		—		5	0	
Borussia; Mönchengladbach	Totals		11	0	3	0	0	0	0	0	14	0	—
Borussia; Mönchengladbach II	2008–09	Regionalliga West	4	0	—		—		—		4	0	
Borussia; Mönchengladbach II	2009–10	Regionalliga West	8	0	—		—		—		8	0	
Borussia; Mönchengladbach II	2010–11	Regionalliga West	9	0	—		—		—		9	0	
Borussia; Mönchengladbach II	Totals		21	0	0	0	0	0	0	0	21	0	—
Augsburg	2010–11	2. Bundesliga	15	2	0	0	—		—		15	2	
Augsburg	2011–12	Bundesliga	30	4	2	0	—		—		32	4	
Augsburg	2012–13	Bundesliga	24	2	2	1	—		—		26	3	
Augsburg	2013–14	Bundesliga	33	1	3	1	—		—		36	2	
Augsburg	2014–15	Bundesliga	23	1	1	0	—		—		24	1	
Augsburg	2015–16	Bundesliga	10	1	1	0	4	0	—		15	1	
Augsburg	2016–17	Bundesliga	1	0	0	0	—		—		1	0	
Augsburg	Totals		136	11	9	2	4	0	0	0	143	13	—
Augsburg II	2012–13	Regionalliga Bayern	1	0	—		—		—		1	0	
Augsburg II	2016–17	Regionalliga Bayern	1	0	—		—		—		1	0	
Augsburg II	2017–18	Regionalliga Bayern	3	1	—		—		—		3	1	
Augsburg II	Totals		5	1	0	0	0	0	0	0	5	1	—
Kaiserslautern (loan)	2017–18	Bundesliga	12	0	0	0	0	0	0	0	12	0	
Career totals			262	15	14	2	19	1	4	1	299	19	—

- 1.Includes DFB-Pokal.
- 2.Includes UEFA Champions League and UEFA Europa League.
- 3.Includes DFB-Ligapokal.
