= Sascha Mölders =

German association football player and manager

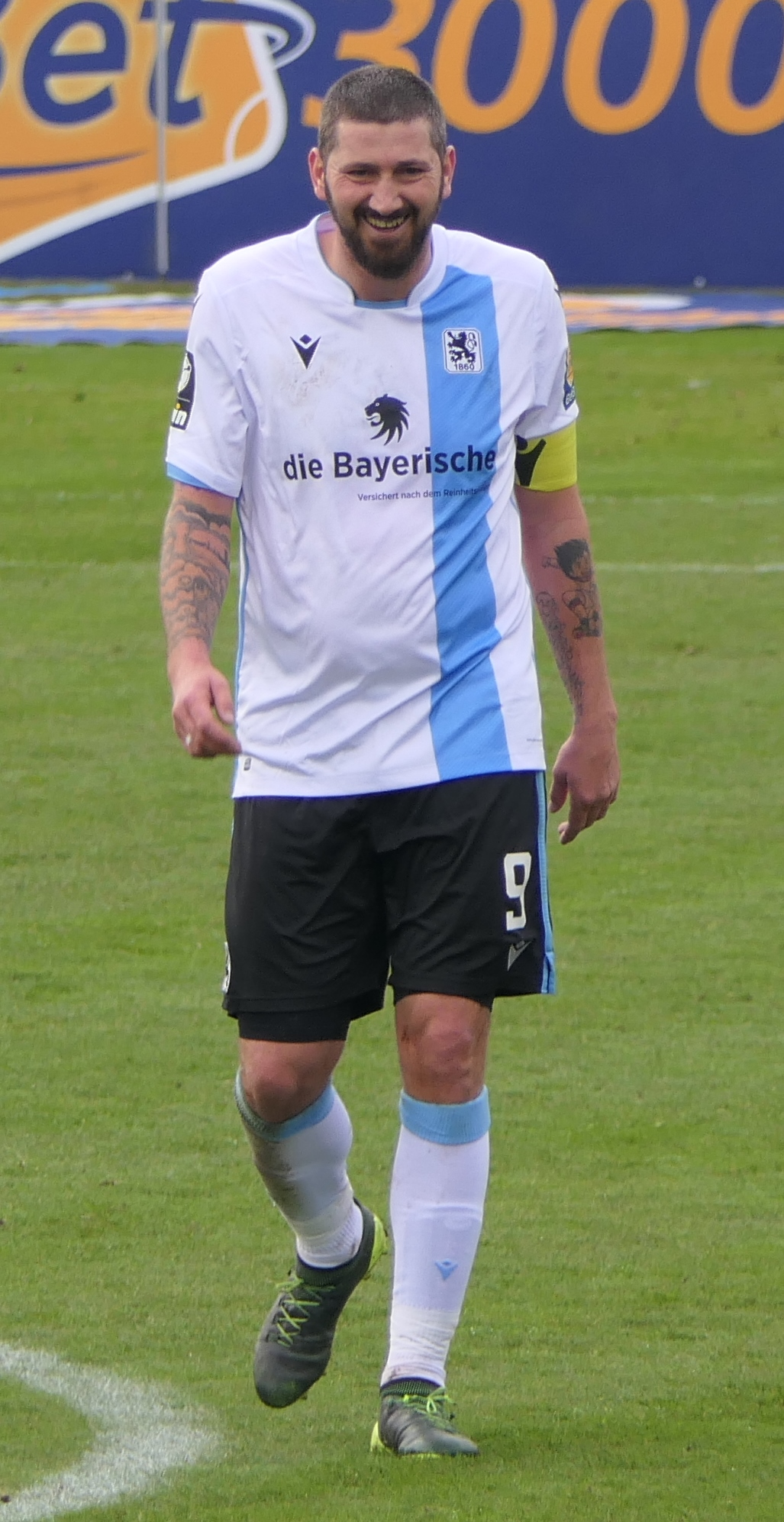
- Mölders in 2020

Personal information
- Date of birth: 20 March 1985 (age 41)
- Place of birth: Essen, West Germany
- Height: 1.87 m (6 ft 2 in)
- Position: Forward

Team information
- Current team: SC Wiedenbrück (manager)

Youth career
- Vogelheimer SV Essen
- Atletico Essen
- –2000: SG Essen Schönebeck
- 2000–2004: Schwarz-Weiß Essen
- 2003–2004: → Wacker Bergeborbeck (loan)

Senior career*
Years	Team	Apps	(Gls)
2004–2006	Schwarz-Weiß Essen	39	(9)
2006–2008	MSV Duisburg II	49	(39)
2007–2008	MSV Duisburg	11	(0)
2008–2010	Rot-Weiß Essen	52	(42)
2010–2011	FSV Frankfurt	47	(18)
2011–2016	FC Augsburg	92	(18)
2012–2016	FC Augsburg II	6	(7)
2016	→ 1860 Munich (loan)	15	(4)
2016–2021	1860 Munich	179	(72)
2022	SG Sonnenhof Großaspach	13	(5)
2022–2024	TSV Landsberg	57	(37)
2024	SV Mering	8	(0)

Managerial career
- 2022: SG Sonnenhof Großaspach (assistant)
- 2022–2024: TSV Landsberg
- 2025–: SC Wiedenbrück
- * Club domestic league appearances and goals as of 15:28, 18 September 2022 (UTC)

Sascha Mölders (born 20 March 1985) is a German football manager and player who currently works as the manager of Regionalliga West club SC Wiedenbrück.

== Career ==
On 7 January 2022, Mölders signed a deal with SG Sonnenhof Großaspach for the remainder of the season as a player and co-trainer. He was given the number 33. Only a few months later, on 29 April 2022, it was announced that he would move to Bayernliga club TSV Landsberg for the 2022–23 season as a player-coach. He left the club in May 2024.

In January 2025, he joined SC Wiedenbrück as new manager.

== Career statistics ==
As of 4 August 2023.

Appearances and goals by club, season and competition
Club	Season	League			Cup		Other		Total	
Club	Season	League	Apps	Goals	Apps	Goals	Apps	Goals	Apps	Goals
MSV Duisburg II	2006–07	Oberliga Niederrhein	30	24	—		—		30	24
MSV Duisburg II	2007–08	Oberliga Niederrhein	19	15	—		—		19	15
MSV Duisburg II	Total		49	39	—		—		49	39
MSV Duisburg	2007–08	Bundesliga	11	0	1	0	—		12	0
Rot-Weiss Essen	2008–09	Regionalliga West	34	28	1	0	—		35	28
Rot-Weiss Essen	2009–10	Regionalliga West	18	14	—		—		18	14
Rot-Weiss Essen	Total		52	42	1	0	—		53	42
FSV Frankfurt	2009–10	2. Bundesliga	13	3	0	0	—		13	3
FSV Frankfurt	2010–11	2. Bundesliga	34	15	2	0	—		36	15
FSV Frankfurt	Total		47	18	2	0	—		49	18
FC Augsburg	2011–12	Bundesliga	29	5	1	0	—		30	5
FC Augsburg	2012–13	Bundesliga	24	10	1	0	—		25	10
FC Augsburg	2013–14	Bundesliga	23	2	3	1	—		26	3
FC Augsburg	2014–15	Bundesliga	12	1	0	0	—		12	1
FC Augsburg	2015–16	Bundesliga	4	0	1	1	—		5	1
FC Augsburg	Total		92	18	6	2	—		98	20
FC Augsburg II	2012–13	Regionalliga Bayern	3	4	—		—		3	4
FC Augsburg II	2013–14	Regionalliga Bayern	1	0	—		—		1	0
FC Augsburg II	2014–15	Regionalliga Bayern	2	3	—		—		2	3
FC Augsburg II	Total		6	7	—		—		6	7
1860 Munich (loan)	2015–16	2. Bundesliga	15	4	0	0	—		15	4
1860 Munich	2016–17	2. Bundesliga	20	3	1	0	2 (Note: Appearances in 2. Bundesliga relegation play-offs)	0	23	3
1860 Munich	2017–18	Regionalliga Bayern	33	19	1	0	2 (Note: Appearances in Regionalliga promotion play-offs)	3	36	22
1860 Munich	2018–19	3. Liga	34	8	1	0	—		35	8
1860 Munich	2019–20	3. Liga	37	15	—		—		37	15
1860 Munich	2020–21	3. Liga	37	22	1	0	—		38	22
1860 Munich	2021–22	3. Liga	18	5	2	0	—		20	5
1860 Munich	Total		196	76	6	0	6	3	208	79
Sonnenhof Großaspach	2021–22	Regionalliga Südwest	13	5	—		—		13	5
TSV Landsberg	2022–23	Oberliga Bayern Süd	34	25	—		—		34	25
TSV Landsberg	2023–24	Oberliga Bayern Süd	3	3	—		—		3	3
TSV Landsberg	Total		37	28	—		—		37	28
Career total			501	233	16	2	4	3	521	238
