= Sebastian Langkamp =

German footballer

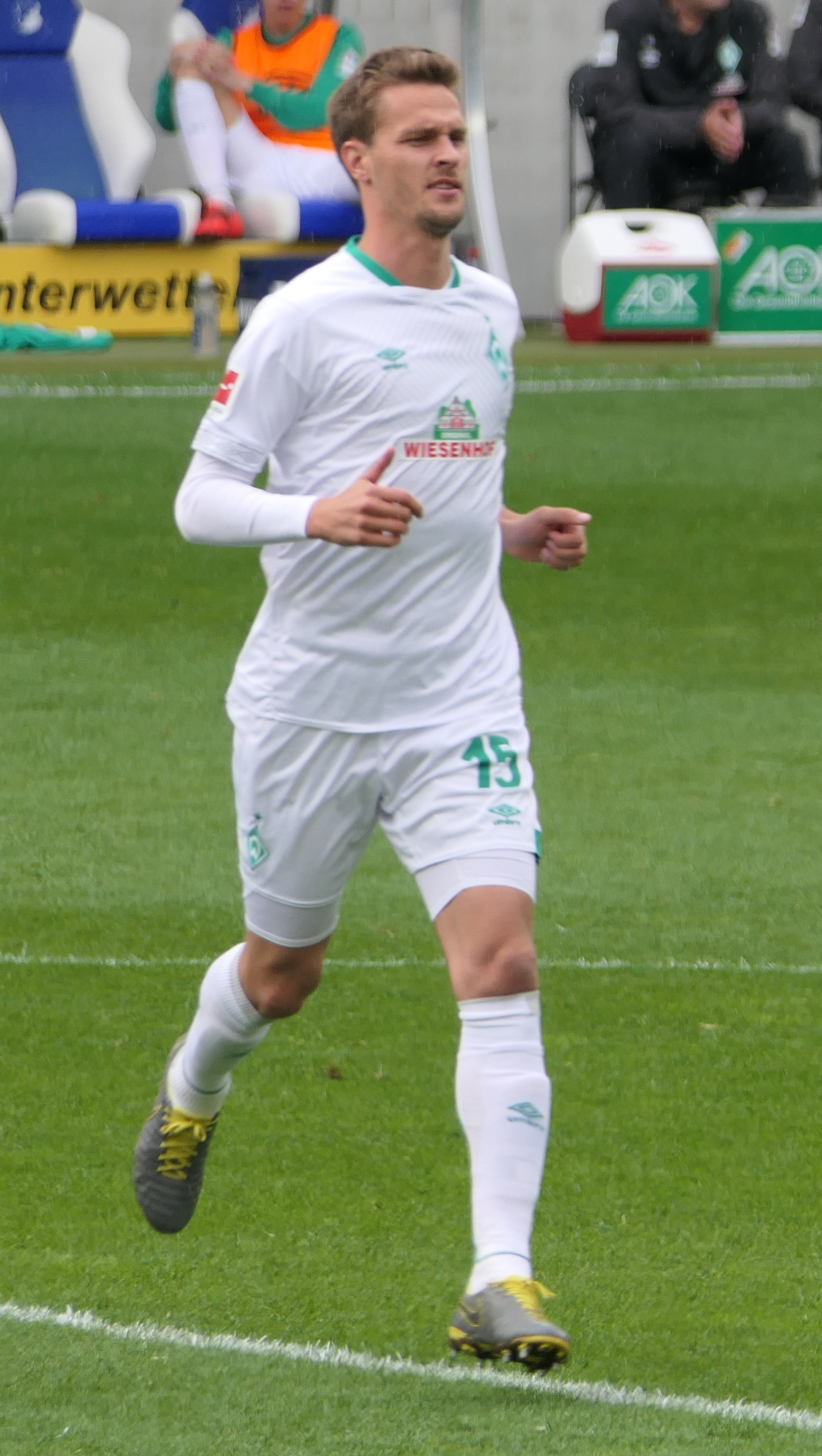
- Langkamp with Werder Bremen in May 2019

Personal information
- Date of birth: 15 January 1988 (age 38)
- Place of birth: Speyer, West Germany
- Height: 1.93 m (6 ft 4 in)
- Position: Defender

Youth career
- DJK-VfL Billerbeck
- SF Merfeld
- Preußen Münster
- 2005–2007: Bayern Munich

Senior career*
| Years | Team | Apps | (Gls) |
| 2007 | Bayern Munich II | 6 | (0) |
| 2007 | Hamburger SV II | 8 | (1) |
| 2008–2010 | Karlsruher SC II | 29 | (3) |
| 2008–2011 | Karlsruher SC | 61 | (4) |
| 2011–2013 | FC Augsburg | 37 | (4) |
| 2013–2018 | Hertha BSC | 106 | (1) |
| 2018–2020 | Werder Bremen | 35 | (0) |
| 2021 | Perth Glory | 2 | (0) |

International career^{‡}
| 2006 | Germany U18 | 2 | (0) |
| 2009 | Germany U21 | 5 | (0) |
- * Club domestic league appearances and goals as of 23 June 2021 ‡ National team caps and goals as of 11:30, 7 July 2020 (UTC)

Sebastian Langkamp (born 15 January 1988) is a German professional footballer who last played as a defender for Perth Glory in the Australian A-League.

His brother Matthias Langkamp is also a professional footballer.

== Club career ==
=== Karlsruher SC ===
Langkamp made his professional debut on 1 March 2009 in a Bundesliga match against VfB Stuttgart while playing at Karlsruher SC.

On his third appearance for Karlsruher SC, an away match against Bayer Leverkusen, Langkamp scored a 50-yard sliding tackle goal which some consider to be one of the most memorable goals in Bundesliga history.

=== Hertha BSC ===
He moved to Hertha BSC from FC Augsburg to play in the 2013–14 Fußball-Bundesliga.

=== Werder Bremen ===
In January 2018, Langkamp joined Werder Bremen.

=== Perth Glory ===
Perth Glory announced that they had signed Langkamp on a two-year deal in January 2021. After overcoming injury, Mr. Langkamp made his debut for Perth Glory in a 2-0 Round 15 loss to Macarthur FC in which he conceded a penalty.

== Career statistics ==
As of 7 July 2020.

| Club | Season | League | | | Cup (Note: Includes German Cup.) | | Europe | | Other | | Total | | Ref. |
| Club | Season | League | Apps | Goals | Apps | Goals | Apps | Goals | Apps | Goals | Apps | Goals | Ref. |
|---|---|---|---|---|---|---|---|---|---|---|---|---|---|
| Bayern Munich II | 2006–07 | Regionalliga Süd | 6 | 0 | — | | — | | — | | 6 | 0 | |
| Hamburger SV II | 2007–08 | Regionalliga Nord | 8 | 1 | — | | — | | — | | 8 | 1 | |
| Karlsruher SC II | 2007–08 | Regionalliga Süd | 13 | 2 | — | | — | | — | | 13 | 2 | |
| Karlsruher SC II | 2008–09 | Regionalliga Süd | 16 | 1 | — | | — | | — | | 16 | 1 | |
| Karlsruher SC II | Total | | 29 | 3 | — | | — | | — | | 29 | 3 | — |
| Karlsruher SC | 2008–09 | Bundesliga | 10 | 1 | 0 | 0 | — | | — | | 10 | 1 | |
| Karlsruher SC | 2009–10 | 2. Bundesliga | 29 | 2 | 2 | 0 | — | | — | | 31 | 2 | |
| Karlsruher SC | 2010–11 | 2. Bundesliga | 22 | 1 | 1 | 0 | — | | — | | 23 | 1 | |
| Karlsruher SC | Total | | 61 | 4 | 3 | 0 | — | | — | | 64 | 4 | — |
| FC Augsburg | 2011–12 | Bundesliga | 26 | 4 | 1 | 0 | — | | — | | 27 | 4 | |
| FC Augsburg | 2012–13 | Bundesliga | 11 | 0 | 2 | 0 | — | | — | | 13 | 0 | |
| FC Augsburg | Total | | 37 | 4 | 3 | 0 | — | | — | | 40 | 4 | — |
| Hertha BSC | 2013–14 | Bundesliga | 29 | 0 | 1 | 0 | — | | — | | 30 | 0 | |
| Hertha BSC | 2014–15 | Bundesliga | 16 | 1 | 1 | 0 | — | | — | | 17 | 1 | |
| Hertha BSC | 2015–16 | Bundesliga | 22 | 0 | 4 | 0 | — | | — | | 26 | 0 | |
| Hertha BSC | 2016–17 | Bundesliga | 27 | 0 | 3 | 0 | 2 (Note: Appearances in UEFA Europa League.) | 0 | — | | 32 | 0 | |
| Hertha BSC | 2017–18 | Bundesliga | 12 | 0 | 1 | 0 | 3 | 0 | — | | 16 | 0 | |
| Hertha BSC | Total | | 106 | 1 | 10 | 0 | 5 | 0 | — | | 121 | 1 | — |
| Werder Bremen | 2017–18 | Bundesliga | 9 | 0 | 1 | 0 | — | | — | | 10 | 0 | |
| Werder Bremen | 2018–19 | Bundesliga | 21 | 0 | 2 | 0 | — | | — | | 23 | 0 | |
| Werder Bremen | 2019–20 | Bundesliga | 5 | 0 | 1 | 0 | — | | 1 (Note: Appearance in Bundesliga relegation playoffs) | 0 | 7 | 0 | |
| Werder Bremen | Total | | 35 | 0 | 4 | 0 | — | | 1 | 0 | 40 | 0 | — |
| Career totals | | | 282 | 13 | 20 | 0 | 5 | 0 | 1 | 0 | 308 | 13 | — |
