= Axel Bellinghausen =

German footballer and manager

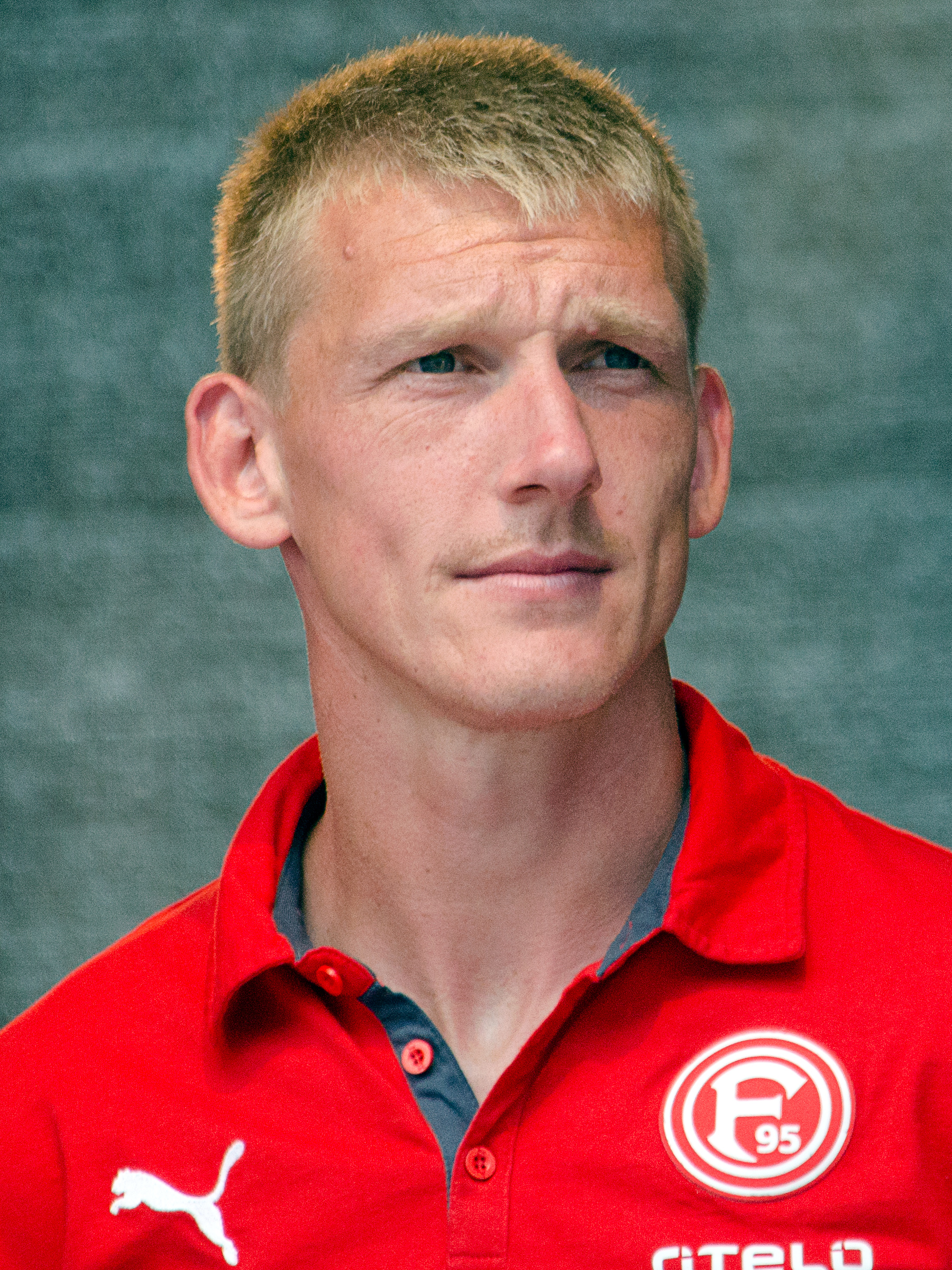
- Bellinghausen with Fortuna Düsseldorf in 2014

Personal information
- Date of birth: 17 May 1983 (age 43)
- Place of birth: Siegburg, West Germany
- Height: 1.82 m (6 ft 0 in)
- Position: Left midfielder

Team information
- Current team: Fortuna Düsseldorf (assistant manager)

Youth career
- 1988–1993: TuS 05 Oberpleis
- 1993–1998: Bayer 04 Leverkusen
- 1998–2001: Fortuna Düsseldorf

Senior career*
Years	Team	Apps	(Gls)
2001–2005	Fortuna Düsseldorf	88	(8)
2005–2009	1. FC Kaiserslautern	96	(7)
2009	1. FC Kaiserslautern II	1	(0)
2009–2012	FC Augsburg	74	(4)
2012–2018	Fortuna Düsseldorf	124	(8)
2017–2018	Fortuna Düsseldorf II	3	(0)
- * Club domestic league appearances and goals

Axel Bellinghausen (born 17 May 1983) is a retired German footballer and current assistant manager of Fortuna Düsseldorf.

== Career ==
Born in Siegburg, North Rhine-Westphalia he started at the age of five playing football at TuS 05 Oberpleis. In 1993, when he was ten years old, he went to Bayer 04 Leverkusen. He left Bayer 04 Leverkusen five years later to play for Fortuna Düsseldorf where he became a professional football player in 2001.

== Honours ==
Augsburg

- 2. Bundesliga runner-up: 2010–11
