= Gibril Sankoh =

Sierra Leonean footballer

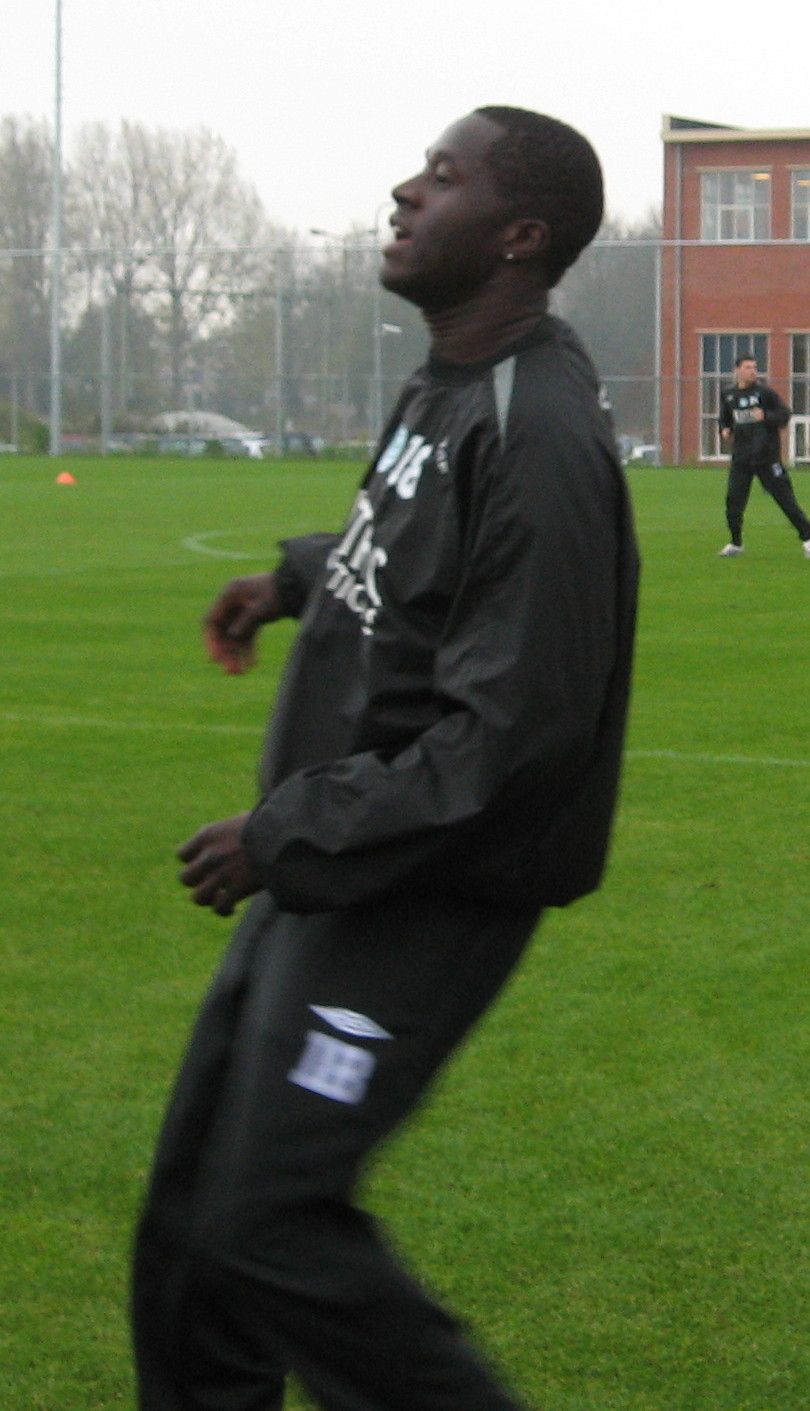
- Sankoh training with FC Groningen in 2006

Personal information
- Date of birth: 15 May 1983 (age 43)
- Place of birth: Freetown, Sierra Leone
- Height: 1.86 m (6 ft 1 in)
- Position: Centre back

Youth career
- Royal Stars
- –2004: De Kennemers

Senior career*
Years	Team	Apps	(Gls)
2004–2005	Stormvogels Telstar	17	(0)
2005–2010	Groningen	150	(0)
2010–2013	FC Augsburg	62	(0)
2013–2014	Henan Jianye	58	(1)
2015	Roda JC Kerkrade	17	(0)
2016–2017	Meizhou Kejia	58	(6)
Total		362	(7)

International career
2012–2013	Sierra Leone	3	(0)
- * Club domestic league appearances and goals

Gibril Sankoh (born 15 May 1983) is a Sierra Leone former professional footballer who played as a centre back.

== Club career ==
Sankoh played in Freetown at Royal Stars and was selected for the Sierra Leone national football team at the age of 17, but would not make his debut. In 2000, he was forced to flee since he had the same surname as rebel leader Foday Sankoh, even though he is not related to him. He arrived in The Netherlands by boat and ended up in an asylum seekers' centre in Rijsbergen. After moving to Heemskerk, he went to play at De Kennemers in Beverwijk. There he was scouted for Stormvogels Telstar.

In the 2004–05 season Sankoh made the transfer to FC Groningen after having played seventeen games for Stormvogels Telstar. In the 05/06 season, Sankoh became a fixture of 'the Pride of the North' and contributed significantly to its success in the following season. In the playoffs of the 2006–07 season, Sankoh scored his first goal for Groningen in the home game against Feyenoord, which was won 2–1. Partly because of this goal, Groningen reached the final of the playoffs. In May 2010, it was announced that Sankoh had to leave FC Groningen after six seasons. His expiring contract was not renewed.

Sankoh was contracted by FC Augsburg from the 2010–11 season, where he signed for two years. This started in the 2. Bundesliga, but followed after a year of promotion to the Bundesliga. He played less and in his third year at the club even less. In February 2013 he switched to the Chinese Henan Jianye FC.

Sankoh returned to the Netherlands in July 2015. He completed training courses with his old team FC Groningen and with PEC Zwolle. In July, he signed a contract until mid-2016 with Roda JC Kerkrade, which had just been promoted to the Eredivisie. He had included in his contract the possibility to exchange the club for another after half a season. After half a year, he left the club to return to China. He went to play football with second divisionist Meizhou Kejia F.C., where he signed a contract for two years. After six months without a club, he played for ACV in mid-2018 till the end of mid-2019.

Sankoh is currently assistant coach for the under 17 team of FC Groningen.

== International career ==
On 8 September 2012, at the age of 29, he made his debut for the West African nation in a qualification match against Tunisia for the 2013 Africa Cup of Nations. The Leone Stars were just slightly eliminated and Sankoh got a red card in the second match against the same team on 13 October.

== Career statistics ==
Appearances and goals by club, season and competition
Club	Season	League			Cup		Continental		Other		Total	
Club	Season	Division	Apps	Goals	Apps	Goals	Apps	Goals	Apps	Goals	Apps	Goals
Stormvogels Telstar	2004–05	Eerste Divisie	17	0	0	0	—		—		17	0
Groningen	2004–05	Eredivisie	8	0	0	0	—		—		8	0
Groningen	2005–06	Eredivisie	25	0	1	0	—		4	0	30	0
Groningen	2006–07	Eredivisie	30	0	2	0	2	0	4	1	38	1
Groningen	2007–08	Eredivisie	31	0	2	0	2	0	1	0	36	0
Groningen	2008–09	Eredivisie	30	0	3	0	—		1	0	34	0
Groningen	2009–10	Eredivisie	26	0	3	0	—		2	0	31	0
Groningen	Total		150	0	11	0	4	0	12	1	177	1
FC Augsburg	2010–11	2. Bundesliga	31	0	3	0	—		—		34	0
FC Augsburg	2011–12	Bundesliga	20	0	2	0	—		—		22	0
FC Augsburg	2012–13	Bundesliga	11	0	1	0	—		—		12	0
FC Augsburg	Total		62	0	6	0	—		—		68	0
Henan Jianye	2013	China League One	29	1	0	0	—		—		29	1
Henan Jianye	2014	Chinese Super League	29	0	2	0	—		—		31	0
Henan Jianye	Total		58	1	2	0	—		—		60	1
Roda JC Kerkrade	2015–16	Eredivisie	17	0	3	0	—		—		20	0
Meizhou Kejia	2016	China League One	29	2	1	0	—		—		30	2
Meizhou Kejia	2017	China League One	29	5	0	0	—		—		29	5
Meizhou Kejia	Total		58	7	1	0	—		—		59	7
Career total			362	8	23	0	4	0	12	1	401	9

== Honours ==
Henan Jianye

- China League One: 2013
