= Moritz Nebel =

German footballer (born 1991)

Personal information
- Full name: Moritz Kaspar Nebel
- Date of birth: 25 September 1991 (age 35)
- Place of birth: Erlangen, Germany
- Height: 1.78 m (5 ft 10 in)
- Position: Midfielder

Youth career
- –2002: VfL Kaufering
- 2002–2010: FC Augsburg

Senior career*
Years	Team	Apps	(Gls)
2010–2011	FC Augsburg	5	(0)
2012–2014	FC Augsburg II	66	(4)
2014–2020	FV Illertissen	125	(9)
2020–2021	TSV Landsberg	1	(0)
2021	FC Dietikon	2	(0)
2021–2022	FC Uster	4	(0)
- * Club domestic league appearances and goals as of 16:40, 4 July 2024 (UTC)

Moritz Kaspar Nebel (born 25 September 1991) is a German footballer who most recently played as a midfielder for Swiss 2. Liga Interregional club FC Uster.
