= Simon Jentzsch =

German footballer

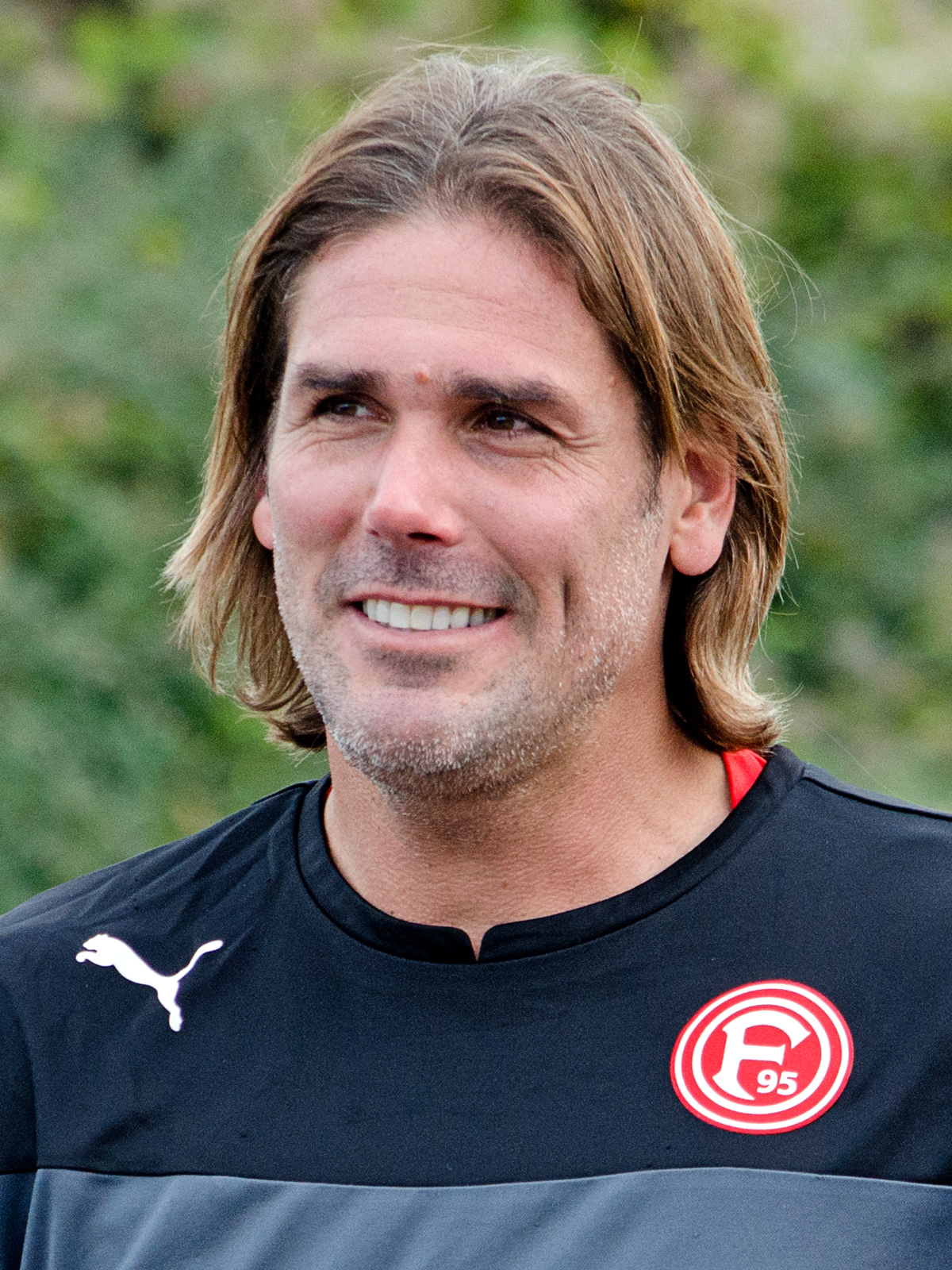
- Jentzsch in 2014

Personal information
- Date of birth: 4 May 1976 (age 50)
- Place of birth: Düsseldorf, West Germany
- Height: 1.96 m (6 ft 5 in)
- Position: Goalkeeper

Team information
- Current team: Bayern Munich Youth (goalkeeping coach)

Youth career
- 1982–1991: SC Waldniel
- 1991–1993: 1. FC Mönchengladbach
- 1993–1994: Bayer Uerdingen

Senior career*
Years	Team	Apps	(Gls)
1994–1995	Bayer Uerdingen	0	(0)
1995–2000	Karlsruher SC	69	(0)
2000–2003	1860 Munich	93	(0)
2003–2009	VfL Wolfsburg	142	(0)
2009–2013	FC Augsburg	98	(0)
Total		402	(0)

International career
1996–1998	Germany U21	12	(0)
1999–2005	Germany B	9	(0)

Managerial career
- 2014–2016: Fortuna Düsseldorf (goalkeeping coach)
- 2019–: Bayern Munich Youth (goalkeeping coach)
- 2019–: Bayern Munich U17 (goalkeeping coach)
- * Club domestic league appearances and goals

Simon Jentzsch (born 4 May 1976) is a German former professional footballer who played as a goalkeeper. He is a goalkeeping coach for Bayern Munich youth.

He appeared in 274 Bundesliga games over the course of 14 seasons, mainly with VfL Wolfsburg (six years). He also represented in the competition Karlsruhe, 1860 Munich and FC Augsburg.

== Club career ==
Born in Düsseldorf, Jentzsch began his professional career at KFC Uerdingen (then named Bayer), moving in July 1995 to Karlsruher SC. He would have to wait until the 1998–99 season to become first-choice, with the club in the second division.

In July 2000, Jentzsch joined 1860 Munich, helping the Bavarians to three consecutive mid-table positions upon which he signed with fellow Bundesliga side VfL Wolfsburg. In his first years he was an important part in the team's consolidation in the top flight, but lost his status midway through 2007–08 to Swiss Diego Benaglio, still appearing in 15 matches to help the Wolves to a final qualification to the UEFA Cup.

On 31 March 2009, Jentzsch's contract with Wolfsburg was terminated and, on 9 June, he signed a one-year deal with FC Augsburg in the second level. He played 33 games in his second year to help his new team reach the main category for the first time in its history; previously, in late November 2009, he extended his link a further two years.

Aged 35–36, Jentzsch was again the starter in the 2011–12 season, helping Augsburg finally avoid relegation while posting the joint-ninth best defensive record with 49 goals against. He retired at the end of the following campaign and, in 2014, joined Fortuna Düsseldorf as their goalkeeper coach.

== International career ==
A German under-21 international, Jentzsch received one callup to the senior side in 2004, but never made his official debut.

Jentzsch holds British Citizenship and was eligible to play international football for either Germany or England thanks to his English mother.

== Career statistics ==
Appearances and goals by club, season and competition
Club	Season	League			Cup		Europe		Other		Total	
Club	Season	Division	Apps	Goals	Apps	Goals	Apps	Goals	Apps	Goals	Apps	Goals
Karlsruher SC	1995–96	Bundesliga	0	0	0	0	—		—		0	0
Karlsruher SC	1996–97	Bundesliga	0	0	3	0	0	0	—		3	0
Karlsruher SC	1997–98	Bundesliga	6	0	0	0	0	0	0	0	6	0
Karlsruher SC	1998–99	2. Bundesliga	32	0	1	0	—		—		33	0
Karlsruher SC	1999–2000	2. Bundesliga	31	0	1	0	—		—		32	0
Karlsruher SC	Total		69	0	5	0	0	0	0	0	74	0
1860 Munich	2000–01	Bundesliga	27	0	3	0	4	0	1	0	35	0
1860 Munich	2001–02	Bundesliga	34	0	3	0	5	0	—		42	0
1860 Munich	2002–03	Bundesliga	32	0	3	0	2	0	—		37	0
1860 Munich	Total		93	0	9	0	11	0	1	0	114	0
VfL Wolfsburg	2003–04	Bundesliga	26	0	2	0	8	0	—		36	0
VfL Wolfsburg	2004–05	Bundesliga	33	0	2	0	1	0	—		36	0
VfL Wolfsburg	2005–06	Bundesliga	34	0	2	0	6	0	—		42	0
VfL Wolfsburg	2006–07	Bundesliga	34	0	5	0	—		—		39	0
VfL Wolfsburg	2007–08	Bundesliga	15	0	2	0	—		—		17	0
VfL Wolfsburg	Total		142	0	13	0	15	0	—		170	0
FC Augsburg	2009–10	2. Bundesliga	32	0	5	0	—		2	0	39	0
FC Augsburg	2010–11	2. Bundesliga	33	0	3	0	—		—		36	0
FC Augsburg	2011–12	Bundesliga	28	0	1	0	—		—		29	0
FC Augsburg	2012–13	Bundesliga	5	0	2	0	—		—		7	0
FC Augsburg	Total		98	0	11	0	—		2	0	111	0
Career total			408	0	29	0	47	0	4	0	488	0
