= Torsten Oehrl =

German footballer

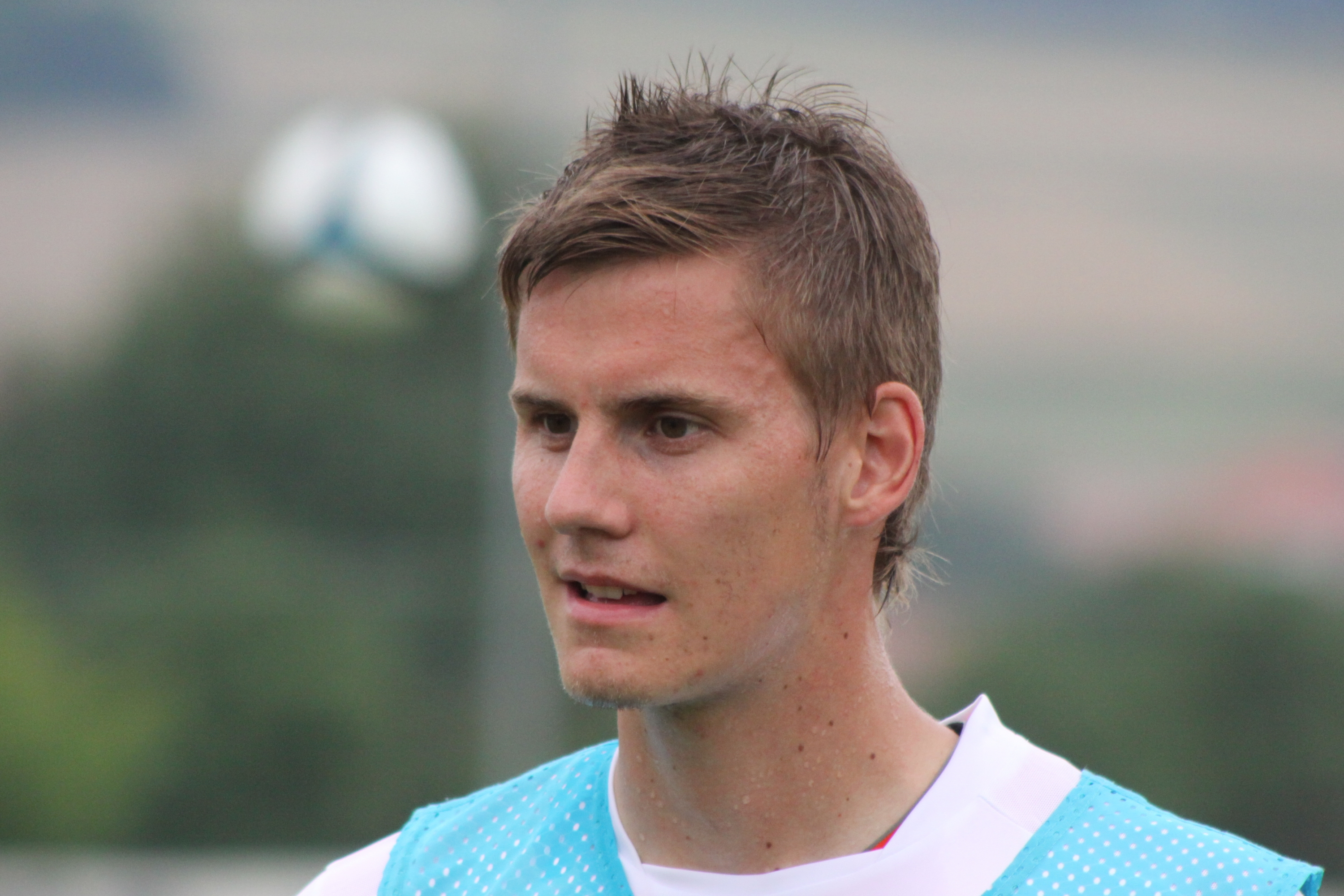
- Oehrl in 2009

Personal information
- Full name: Torsten Oehrl
- Date of birth: 7 January 1986 (age 40)
- Place of birth: Lichtenfels, West Germany
- Height: 1.92 m (6 ft 4 in)
- Position: Striker

Youth career
- 1993–1996: SV Memmelsdorf
- 1996–2001: SV Hallstadt
- 2001–2003: Eintracht Bamberg
- 2003–2005: Greuther Fürth

Senior career*
| Years | Team | Apps | (Gls) |
| 2005–2006 | Greuther Fürth II | 22 | (10) |
| 2005–2008 | Greuther Fürth | 9 | (1) |
| 2007 | → Kickers Offenbach (loan) | 12 | (2) |
| 2007–2008 | → Eintracht Braunschweig (loan) | 32 | (8) |
| 2008–2010 | Werder Bremen II | 53 | (23) |
| 2009–2010 | Werder Bremen | 1 | (0) |
| 2010 | → Fortuna Düsseldorf (loan) | 15 | (2) |
| 2010–2013 | FC Augsburg | 72 | (12) |
| 2013–2015 | Eintracht Braunschweig | 12 | (2) |
| 2013–2015 | Eintracht Braunschweig II | 6 | (0) |
| 2015–2016 | Wehen Wiesbaden | 24 | (8) |
| 2016–2017 | Bayern Munich II | 16 | (5) |
| Total | | 274 | (73) |

International career
| 2004 | Germany U18 | 2 | (1) |
| 2004 | Germany U19 | 4 | (0) |
- * Club domestic league appearances and goals

Torsten Oehrl (born 7 January 1986) is a German former professional footballer who played as a striker.

== Career ==
In 2013, Oehrl joined Eintracht Braunschweig from FC Augsburg. In August 2015, he transferred from Braunschweig to 3. Liga side SV Wehen Wiesbaden.

He was a youth international for Germany, most recently for the under-19 team.
