= Paul Verhaegh =

Dutch footballer

Personal information
- Full name: Paul Johannes Gerardus Verhaegh
- Date of birth: 1 September 1983 (age 43)
- Place of birth: Kronenberg, Netherlands
- Height: 1.78 m (5 ft 10 in)
- Position: Right-back

Youth career
- S.V. Kronenberg
- VVV-Venlo
- PSV

Senior career*
Years	Team	Apps	(Gls)
2003–2004	PSV	0	(0)
2003–2004	→ AGOVV Apeldoorn (loan)	33	(1)
2004–2006	FC Den Bosch	56	(4)
2006–2010	Vitesse	138	(6)
2010–2017	FC Augsburg	186	(20)
2017–2019	VfL Wolfsburg	33	(2)
2019–2020	Twente	7	(0)
Total		453	(33)

International career
2006–2007	Netherlands U21	20	(5)
2009	Netherlands B	2	(0)
2013–2014	Netherlands	3	(0)
Medal record
Men's football
Representing Netherlands
FIFA World Cup
Third place	2014
UEFA European Under-21 Championship
Winner	2006
- * Club domestic league appearances and goals

Paul Johannes Gerardus Verhaegh (born 1 September 1983) is a former Dutch professional footballer who played as a right-back.

== Club career ==
Verhaegh began his career at PSV Eindhoven, making 33 league appearances while on loan at AGOVV Apeldoorn. He then moved to FC Den Bosch in 2004, making 32 league appearances, before moving to Vitesse after the 2004–05 season. After four years, he left Vitesse and signed a two-year contract with FC Augsburg on 27 May 2010.

After having spent seven years with FC Augsburg, Verhaegh switched to VfL Wolfsburg, after agreeing to a two-year deal. In April 2019, it was announced that Verhaegh had been released by the club with immediate effect.

On 5 June 2019, Dutch club FC Twente signed Verhaegh on a one-year contract with the club following a medical. Verhaegh announced his retirement on 3 June 2020.

== International career ==
Verhaegh was a member of the Netherlands U-21 squad that won the 2006 UEFA European Under-21 Championship.

He made his debut for the senior national team against Portugal in a 1–1 friendly draw on 15 August 2013. He was also part of the squad for the 2014 FIFA World Cup in Brazil. He started in the round of 16 match against Mexico, where the Netherlands relied on late goals to progress to the quarter-finals on their way to finishing third.

== Career statistics ==
=== Club ===
Appearances and goals by club, season and competition
Club	Season	League			Cup		Other		Total	
Club	Season	Division	Apps	Goals	Apps	Goals	Apps	Goals	Apps	Goals
AGOVV Apeldoorn (loan)	2003–04	Eerste Divisie	33	1	0	0	–		33	1
FC Den Bosch	2004–05	Eredivisie	32	0	0	0	–		32	0
FC Den Bosch	2005–06	Eerste Divisie	24	4	0	0	–		24	4
FC Den Bosch	Total		56	4	0	0	0	0	56	4
Vitesse	2005–06	Eredivisie	12	0	0	0	6 (Note: Eredivisie play-offs for UEFA Intertoto Cup)	0	18	0
Vitesse	2006–07	Eredivisie	32	2	0	0	5	0	37	2
Vitesse	2007–08	Eredivisie	33	0	1	0	–		34	0
Vitesse	2008–09	Eredivisie	31	2	1	0	–		32	2
Vitesse	2009–10	Eredivisie	30	2	2	0	–		32	2
Vitesse	Total		138	6	4	0	11	0	153	6
FC Augsburg	2010–11	2. Bundesliga	30	1	3	0	–		33	1
FC Augsburg	2011–12	Bundesliga	26	1	3	1	–		29	2
FC Augsburg	2012–13	Bundesliga	17	0	1	0	–		18	0
FC Augsburg	2013–14	Bundesliga	30	3	3	0	–		33	3
FC Augsburg	2014–15	Bundesliga	27	6	1	0	–		28	6
FC Augsburg	2015–16	Bundesliga	25	6	2	0	8 (Note: Appearances in UEFA Europa League)	1	35	7
FC Augsburg	2016–17	Bundesliga	31	3	0	0	–		31	3
FC Augsburg	Total		186	20	13	1	8	1	207	22
VfL Wolfsburg	2017–18	Bundesliga	31	2	2	0	–		33	2
VfL Wolfsburg	2018–19	Bundesliga	2	0	1	0	–		3	0
VfL Wolfsburg	Total		33	2	3	0	0	0	36	2
Twente	2019–20	Eredivisie	7	0	1	0	–		8	0
Career total			453	33	21	1	19	1	493	35

=== International ===
Appearances and goals by national team and year
National team	Year	Apps	Goals
Netherlands	2013	1	0
Netherlands	2014	2	0
Total		3	0

== Honours ==
FC Augsburg

- Maspalomas Cup: 2014
- 2. Bundesliga runner-up: 2010–11

Netherlands U21

- UEFA European Under-21 Championship: 2006

Netherlands

- FIFA World Cup third place: 2014
