= Tobias Werner =

German former professional footballer (born 1985)

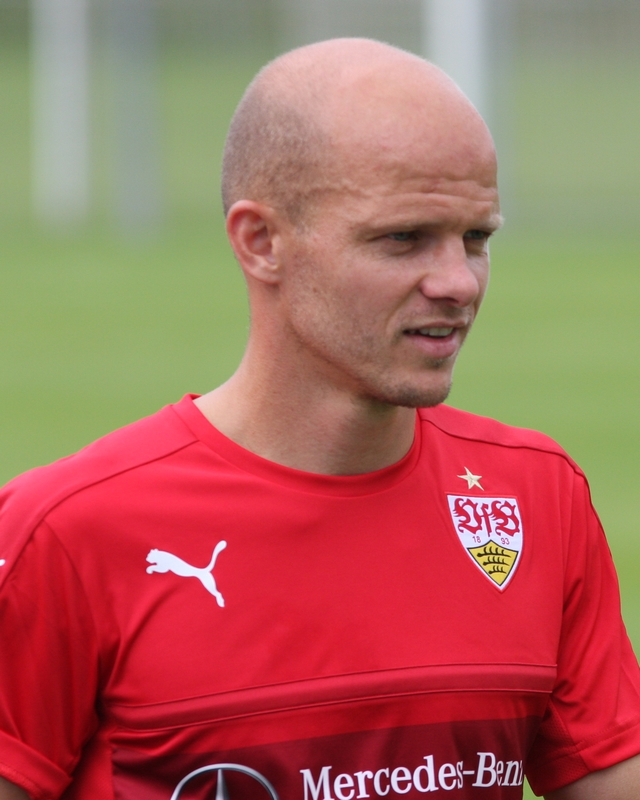
- Werner training with VfB Stuttgart in 2016

Personal information
- Date of birth: 19 July 1985 (age 41)
- Place of birth: Gera, East Germany
- Height: 1.74 m (5 ft 9 in)
- Positions: Left midfielder; winger

Youth career
- –1998: 1. SV Gera
- 1998–2004: Carl Zeiss Jena

Senior career*
Years	Team	Apps	(Gls)
2004–2008	Carl Zeiss Jena	90	(12)
2008–2016	FC Augsburg	187	(35)
2016–2018	VfB Stuttgart	6	(0)
2017–2018	→ 1. FC Nürnberg (loan)	26	(2)
2018–2019	VfB Stuttgart II	16	(0)
Total		325	(49)
- * Club domestic league appearances and goals

Tobias Werner (born 19 July 1985) is a German former professional footballer who played as a left midfielder or winger.

== Career ==
On 3 August 2016, Werner moved to VfB Stuttgart. On 28 August 2017, he was loaned out to 1. FC Nürnberg until the end of the season. After the end of the loan deal, Werner joined VfB Stuttgart II.

In March 2019, Werner announced his retirement, "mostly due to health issues" having agreed the early termination of his contract until 2019.
