= 2010–11 Hertha BSC season =

Hertha BSC
2010–11 season
- President: Werner Gegenbauer
- Manager: Markus Babbel
- 2. Bundesliga: 1st
- DFB-Pokal: Second round
- Top goalscorer: League: Adrián Ramos (15 goals); All: Adrián Ramos (17 goals)
- Highest home attendance: 74,228 (v. Union Berlin (v. FC Augsburg)
- Lowest home attendance: 28,973 (v. VfL Bochum)
- Average home league attendance: 45,958
Home colours	Away colours	Third colours

The 2010–11 season of Hertha BSC began between 14 August 2010 with a DFB-Pokal match against SC Pfullendorf, and ended on 15 May 2011, the last match day of the 2. Bundesliga, with a match against FC Augsburg. With a 1–0 victory over MSV Duisburg on 25 April 2011, Hertha secured promotion to the Bundesliga with three matches left to play. Two weeks later, Hertha secured the championship with a 2–0 over Erzgebirge Aue. In the DFB-Pokal, Hertha were eliminated in the 2nd round.

== Transfers ==
=== Summer transfers ===
In: Note: Flags indicate national team as defined under FIFA eligibility rules; some limited exceptions apply. Players may hold more than one non-FIFA nationality.

No.	Pos.	Nation	Player
1	GK	NED	Maikel Aerts (from Willem II)
2	DF	GER	Christian Lell (from Bayern Munich)
4	DF	CZE	Roman Hubník (from FC Moscow, previously on loan)
5	DF	CRO	Andre Mijatović (from Arminia Bielefeld)
7	MF	AUT	Daniel Beichler (from Sturm Graz)
12	DF	BRA	Ronny (from Sporting CP, previously on loan at União de Leiria)
13	MF	AUS	Nikita Rukavytsya (from Twente)
14	DF	GER	Sebastian Neumann (from Hertha BSC U-19)
16	FW	CAN	Rob Friend (from Borussia Mönchengladbach)
18	MF	GER	Peter Niemeyer (from Werder Bremen)
19	FW	GER	Pierre-Michel Lasogga (from Bayer Leverkusen II)
22	DF	BRA	Kaká (loan return from Omonia)
30	MF	GER	Zecke Neuendorf (from FC Ingolstadt)
31	GK	GER	Marco Sejna (from FC Ingolstadt)

Out: Note: Flags indicate national team as defined under FIFA eligibility rules; some limited exceptions apply. Players may hold more than one non-FIFA nationality.

No.	Pos.	Nation	Player
1	GK	CZE	Jaroslav Drobný (to Hamburger SV)
3	DF	GER	Arne Friedrich (to VfL Wolfsburg)
4	DF	SUI	Steve von Bergen (to Cesena)
5	DF	SRB	Nemanja Pejčinović (loan return to Rad)
7	MF	BRA	Cícero (loan return to Tombense Futebol Clube)
11	MF	GER	Florian Kringe (loan return to Borussia Dortmund)
12	GK	GER	Timo Ochs (released)
13	DF	GER	Marc Stein (to FSV Frankfurt)
17	FW	GRE	Theofanis Gekas (loan return to Bayer Leverkusen)
18	FW	POL	Artur Wichniarek (to Lech Poznań)
22	DF	SWE	Rasmus Bengtsson (to Twente)
25	MF	ROU	Maximilian Nicu (to SC Freiburg)
26	MF	POL	Łukasz Piszczek (to Borussia Dortmund)
30	GK	GER	Christopher Gäng (to RB Leipzig)
44	MF	SRB	Gojko Kačar (to Hamburger SV)
--	MF	BRA	Lúcio (released, previously on loan at Grêmio)
--	FW	TUN	Amine Chermiti (to Zürich, previously on loan at Al-Ittihad)

=== Winter transfers ===
In: Note: Flags indicate national team as defined under FIFA eligibility rules; some limited exceptions apply. Players may hold more than one non-FIFA nationality.

No.	Pos.	Nation	Player

Out: Note: Flags indicate national team as defined under FIFA eligibility rules; some limited exceptions apply. Players may hold more than one non-FIFA nationality.

No.	Pos.	Nation	Player
7	MF	AUT	Daniel Beichler (on loan to St. Gallen)
8	MF	HUN	Pál Dárdai (to Hertha BSC II)
22	DF	BRA	Kaká (on loan to Braga)
24	DF	GER	Shervin Radjabali-Fardi (on loan to Alemannia Aachen)

== Goals and appearances ==
No.	Pos	Nat	Player	Total		2. Bundesliga		DFB-Pokal	
No.	Pos	Nat	Player	Apps	Goals	Apps	Goals	Apps	Goals
1	GK	(Netherlands) NED	Maikel Aerts	25	0	24	0	1	0
2	DF	(Germany) GER	Christian Lell	35	0	33	0	2	0
3	DF	(Georgia (country)) GEO	Levan Kobiashvili	34	3	32	3	2	0
4	DF	(Czech Republic) CZE	Roman Hubník	33	3	31	3	2	0
5	DF	(Croatia) CRO	Andre Mijatović	27	1	26	1	1	0
6	DF	(Germany) GER	Christoph Janker	4	0	4	0	0	0
7	MF	(Austria) AUT	Daniel Beichler^{2}	0	0	0	0	0	0
8	DF	(Hungary) HUN	Pál Dárdai^{1}	1	0	1	0	0	0
9	FW	(Colombia) COL	Adrián Ramos	35	17	33	15	2	2
10	MF	(Brazil) BRA	Raffael	31	10	30	10	1	0
12	DF	(Brazil) BRA	Ronny	23	2	22	2	1	0
13	MF	(Australia) AUS	Nikita Rukavytsya	32	4	31	4	1	0
14	DF	(Germany) GER	Sebastian Neumann	13	0	11	0	2	0
15	MF	(Germany) GER	Sascha Bigalke	0	0	0	0	0	0
16	FW	(Canada) CAN	Rob Friend	27	6	25	5	2	1
17	FW	(Bulgaria) BUL	Valeri Domovchiyski	22	5	20	5	2	0
18	MF	(Germany) GER	Peter Niemeyer	30	3	28	3	2	0
19	FW	(Germany) GER	Pierre-Michel Lasogga	25	13	25	13	0	0
20	MF	(Germany) GER	Patrick Ebert	12	1	12	1	0	0
21	GK	(Germany) GER	Sascha Burchert	3	0	3	0	0	0
22	DF	(Brazil) BRA	Kaká^{2}	1	0	1	0	0	0
23	MF	(Germany) GER	Fanol Perdedaj	17	0	16	0	1	0
24	DF	(Germany) GER	Shervin Radjabali-Fardi^{2}	0	0	0	0	0	0
25	MF	(Germany) GER	Lennart Hartmann	0	0	0	0	0	0
26	DF	(Germany) GER	Nico Schulz	23	0	21	0	2	0
27	MF	(Germany) GER	Alfredo Morales^{1}	3	0	3	0	0	0
28	MF	(Switzerland) SUI	Fabian Lustenberger	18	1	18	1	0	0
29	MF	(Germany) GER	Marvin Knoll^{1}	2	0	2	0	0	0
30	MF	(Germany) GER	Zecke Neuendorf^{1}	1	0	1	0	0	0
31	GK	(Germany) GER	Marco Sejna	8	0	7	0	1	0
35	FW	(Austria) AUT	Marco Djuricin	9	2	9	2	0	0

Last Updated: 15 May 2011

Notes

- ^1 Not a full-time member of the first team.
- ^2 Left Hertha in the winter transfer period.

== Results ==
=== 2. Bundesliga ===
Win Draw Loss

Note: Results are given with Hertha BSC score listed first.

Game	Date	Venue	Opponent	Result F–A	Attendance	Hertha BSC Goalscorers
1	20 August 2010	H	Rot-Weiß Oberhausen	3–2	48,385	Domovchiyski 30', Djuricin 49', 80'
2	30 August 2010	A	Fortuna Düsseldorf	2–1	30,629	Friend 25', Domovchiyski 30'
3	12 September 2010	H	Arminia Bielefeld	3–1	47,726	Friend 5', 79', Ramos 7'
4	17 September 2010	A	Union Berlin	1–1	18,500	Niemeyer 2'
5	21 September 2010	H	Karlsruher SC	4–0	33,828	Ramos 1', Rukavytsya 23', Domovchiyski 54', Raffael 77'
6	24 September 2010	A	FC Energie Cottbus	1–0	21,250	Friend 59'
7	4 October 2010	H	Alemannia Aachen	0–0	34,762
8	16 October 2010	A	FSV Frankfurt	1–0	7,477	Ramos 88'
9	22 October 2010	H	SpVgg Greuther Fürth	2–0	39,274	Domovchiyski 76', Raffael 90'
10	30 October 2010	H	FC Ingolstadt 04	3–1	38,529	Raffael 17', Domovchiyski 52', Ramos 69'
11	7 November 2010	A	SC Paderborn 07	0–1	12,261
12	15 November 2010	H	VfL Bochum	2–0	28,973	Lasogga 32', 69'
13	19 November 2010	A	VfL Osnabrück	0–2	16,200
14	27 November 2010	H	MSV Duisburg	0–2	32,052
15	5 December 2010	A	1860 Munich	0–1	23,600
16	12 December 2010	H	Erzgebirge Aue	2–0	45,892	Kobiashvili 36' (pen.), Lasogga 65'
17	18 December 2010	A	FC Augsburg	1–1	25,647	Rukavytsya 27'
18	17 January 2011	A	Rot-Weiß Oberhausen	3–1	6,850	Lasogga 7', 67', Kobiashvili 70' (pen.)
19	23 January 2011	H	Fortuna Düsseldorf	4–2	36,126	Ramos 29', 90+4', Rukavytsya 51', Lasogga 77'
20	30 January 2011	A	Arminia Bielefeld	3–1	20,017	Ronny 18', Raffael 39', 76'
21	5 February 2011	H	Union Berlin	1–2	74,228	Hubník 13'
22	13 February 2011	A	Karlsruher SC	6–2	20,823	Raffael 47', 62', 66', Ramos 72', 87', Ronny 90'
23	21 February 2011	H	Energie Cottbus	2–2	40,134	Lasogga 16', Hubník 40'
24	26 February 2011	A	Alemannia Aachen	5–0	20,758	Lustenberger 10', Ramos 33', 59', Lasogga 36', Rukavystya 56'
25	4 March 2011	H	FSV Frankfurt	3–1	32,401	Ebert 21', Hubník 34', Raffael 82'
26	14 March 2011	A	SpVgg Greuther Fürth	2–0	12,790	Ramos 40', Niemeyer 50'
27	18 March 2011	A	FC Ingolstadt 04	1–1	10,900	Lasogga 70'
28	3 April 2011	H	SC Paderborn 07	2–0	70,621	Lasogga 39', Mijatović 45+1'
29	11 April 2011	A	VfL Bochum	2–0	24,211	Niemeyer 24', Raffael 87'
30	16 April 2011	H	VfL Osnabrück	4–0	46,293	Lasogga 37', 56', Ramos 41', 89'
31	25 April 2011	A	MSV Duisburg	1–0	16,777	Ramos 27'
32	29 April 2011	H	1860 Munich	1–2	57,829	Aygün 60' (o.g.)
33	8 May 2011	A	Erzgebirge Aue	2–0		Ramos 14', Friend 44'
34	15 Mary 2011	H	FC Augsburg	2–1	74,228	Lasogga 44', Kobiashvili 74' (pen.)

=== DFB-Pokal ===
Win Draw Loss

Note: Results are given with Hertha BSC score listed first.

Game	Date	Venue	Opponent	Result F–A	Attendance	Hertha BSC Goalscorers
1	14 August 2009	A	SC Pfullendorf	2–0	7,100	Ramos 61', Friend 75'
2	26 October 2010	A	TuS Koblenz	1–2	7,500	Ramos 88'

== Kits ==
Home	Away	Away Alternate	Third

== See also ==
- 2010–11 2. Fußball-Bundesliga
- 2010–11 DFB-Pokal
- Hertha BSC
