= 2015–16 FC Augsburg season =

FC Augsburg
2015–16 season
- Chairman: Walther Seinsch
- Manager: Markus Weinzierl
- Stadium: WWK ARENA, Augsburg, Bavaria
- Bundesliga: 12th
- DFB-Pokal: Round of 16
- Europa League: Round of 32
- Top goalscorer: League: Koo Ja-cheol (8); All: Raúl Bobadilla (11)
Home colours	Away colours	Third colours

The 2015–16 FC Augsburg season was the club's fifth consecutive season in the Bundesliga and their 47th season overall. They also played in the DFB-Pokal and Europa League.

== Competitions ==
=== Bundesliga ===
==== League table ====
Pos	Team	Pld	W	D	L	GF	GA	GD	Pts
10	Hamburger SV	34	11	8	15	40	46	−6	41
11	FC Ingolstadt	34	10	10	14	33	42	−9	40
12	FC Augsburg	34	9	11	14	42	52	−10	38
13	Werder Bremen	34	10	8	16	50	65	−15	38
14	Darmstadt 98	34	9	11	14	38	53	−15	38

Source: DFB
Rules for classification: 1) Points; 2) Goal difference; 3) Goals scored; 4) Head-to-head points; 5) Head-to-head goal difference; 6) Head-to-head away goals scored; 7) Away goals scored; 8) Play-offs.

==== Results summary ====
Overall								Home						Away					
Pld	W	D	L	GF	GA	GD	Pts	W	D	L	GF	GA	GD	W	D	L	GF	GA	GD
34	9	11	14	42	52	−10	38	3	6	8	18	27	−9	6	5	6	24	25	−1

Last updated: 14 May 2016.
Source: Bundesliga

==== Results by round ====
Round	1	2	3	4	5	6	7	8	9	10	11	12	13	14	15	16	17	18	19	20	21	22	23	24	25	26	27	28	29	30	31	32	33	34
Ground	H	A	H	A	H	A	H	A	H	A	H	H	A	H	A	H	A	A	H	A	H	A	H	A	H	A	H	A	A	H	A	H	A	H
Result	L	D	L	L	W	L	L	D	L	L	D	L	W	D	W	W	W	D	D	L	L	W	D	L	D	D	L	L	W	W	W	D	D	L
Position	13	14	15	14	14	14	16	16	18	18	18	18	17	16	16	13	12	13	12	14	14	13	13	13	14	13	15	16	15	14	12	12	11	12

Updated to match(es) played on 14 May 2016. Source: Bundesliga
A = Away; H = Home; W = Win; D = Draw; L = Loss

==== Matches ====
15 August 2015 1	FC Augsburg	0–1	Hertha BSC	Augsburg
15:30 CEST (UTC+02:00)	Bobadilla (yellow card) 5' (yellow-red card) 45+2'; Kohr (yellow card) 78'	Report	Darida (yellow card) 18'; Kalou 48' (pen.); Beerens (yellow card) 54' (yellow-red card) 66'; Langkamp (yellow card) 74'	Stadium: WWK ARENA; Attendance: 28,130; Referee: Tobias Welz

22 August 2015 2	Eintracht Frankfurt	1–1	FC Augsburg	Frankfurt
15:30 CEST (UTC+02:00)	Hasebe (yellow card) 20'; Russ 86'; Zambrano (yellow card) 89'	Report	Caiuby 23'; Kohr (yellow card) 53'; Verhaegh (yellow card) 89'; Feulner (yellow card) 90+1'	Stadium: Commerzbank-Arena; Attendance: 45,000; Referee: Florian Meyer

29 August 2015 3	FC Augsburg	0–1	FC Ingolstadt	Augsburg
15:30 CEST (UTC+02:00)	Caiuby (yellow card) 13'; Hong (yellow card) 26'; Matavž (yellow card) 90+2'	Report	Leckie (yellow card) 41', (goal) 63'; Hartmann (yellow card) 57'; Matip (yellow card) 68'	Stadium: WWK ARENA; Attendance: 30,003; Referee: Jochen Drees

12 September 2015 4	Bayern Munich	2–1	FC Augsburg	Munich
15:30 CEST (UTC+02:00)	Lewandowski 77'; Müller 90' (pen.)	Report	Esswein 43'; Verhaegh (yellow card) 89'	Stadium: Allianz Arena; Attendance: 75,000; Referee: Knut Kircher

20 September 2015 5	FC Augsburg	2–0	Hannover 96	Augsburg
17:30 CEST (UTC+02:00)	Esswein 29'; Verhaegh 32' (pen.), (yellow card) 34'	Report	Sorg (yellow card) 23'; Marcelo (yellow card) 31'; Schulz (yellow card) 71'; Andreasen (yellow card) 89'	Stadium: WWK ARENA; Attendance: 28,511; Referee: Christian Dingert

23 September 2015 6	Borussia Mönchengladbach	4–2	FC Augsburg	Mönchengladbach
20:00 CEST (UTC+02:00)	Johnson 5'; Xhaka 17', (yellow card) 47'; Stindl 19', (yellow card) 53'; Dahoud 21'	Report	Stafylidis (yellow card) 11'; Verhaegh (yellow card) 16', (goal) 51' (pen.), 75' (pen.); Hong (yellow card) 80'; Baier (yellow card) 86'; Ji (yellow card) 90'	Stadium: Stadion im Borussia-Park; Attendance: 40,511; Referee: Daniel Siebert

26 September 2015 7	FC Augsburg	1–3	TSG Hoffenheim	Augsburg
15:30 CEST (UTC+02:00)	Koo 38'; Hong (yellow card) 68'	Report	Volland 10', 68' (pen.), (yellow card) 60'; Strobl (yellow card) 48'; Süle (yellow card) 65'; Schmid 73'; Schwegler (yellow card) 78'	Stadium: WWK ARENA; Attendance: 27,112; Referee: Manuel Gräfe

4 October 2015 8	Bayer Leverkusen	1–1	FC Augsburg	Leverkusen
17:30 CEST (UTC+02:00)	Bellarabi 39'; Wendell (yellow card) 69'; Donati (yellow card) 72'	Report	Leno 12' (o.g.); Callsen-Bracker (yellow card) 53'; Baier (yellow card) 68'; Hitz (yellow card) 90+1'	Stadium: BayArena; Attendance: 28,475; Referee: Tobias Stieler

17 October 2015 9	FC Augsburg	0–2	Darmstadt 98	Augsburg
15:30 CEST (UTC+02:00)	Baier (yellow card) 61'; Caiuby (yellow card) 67'	Report	Wagner 7'; Niemeyer 29'; Heller (yellow card) 47'; Garics (yellow card) 66'; Caldirola (yellow card) 85'	Stadium: WWK ARENA; Attendance: 30,009; Referee: Sascha Stegemann

25 October 2015 10	Borussia Dortmund	5–1	FC Augsburg	Dortmund
15:30 CET (UTC+01:00)	Aubameyang 18', 85', 90+1'; Reus 21', 33'	Report	Bobadilla 49'; Werner (yellow card) 60'; Feulner (yellow card) 73'	Stadium: Signal Iduna Park; Attendance: 81,359; Referee: Manuel Gräfe

31 October 2015 11	FC Augsburg	3–3	Mainz 05	Augsburg
15:30 CET (UTC+01:00)	Verhaegh 42' (pen.); Koo 50', (yellow card) 63'; Ji (yellow card) 62'; Kohr (yellow card) 69'; Bobadilla 81'	Report	Muto 18', 30', 90+3' de Blasis (yellow card) 41'; Jara (yellow card) 44'; Latza (yellow card) 47'	Stadium: WWK ARENA; Attendance: 27,200; Referee: Marco Fritz

8 November 2015 12	FC Augsburg	1–2	Werder Bremen	Augsburg
17:30 CET (UTC+01:00)	Kohr (yellow card) 3'; Verhaegh 90+1' (pen.)	Report	S. García (yellow card) 11'; Pizarro 58'; Bartels 69'; Vestergaard (yellow card) 77'; Junuzović (yellow card) 90+3'; Wiedwald (yellow card) 90+4'	Stadium: WWK ARENA; Attendance: 28,122; Referee: Tobias Stieler

21 November 2015 13	VfB Stuttgart	0–4	FC Augsburg	Stuttgart
15:45 CET (UTC+01:00)	Die (yellow card) 57'; Kliment (yellow card) 68'	Report	Esswein 11'; Baumgartl 17' (o.g.); Callsen-Bracker 36'; Koo (yellow card) 38', (goal) 54'	Stadium: Mercedes-Benz Arena; Attendance: 54,925; Referee: Sascha Stegemann

29 November 2015 14	FC Augsburg	0–0	VfL Wolfsburg	Augsburg
17:30 CET (UTC+01:00)	Bobadilla (yellow card) 39'; Koo (yellow card) 53'; Caiuby (yellow card) 60'	Report	Naldo (yellow card) 44'; Dante (yellow card) 65' (yellow-red card) 85'; Caligiuri (yellow card) 83'	Stadium: WWK ARENA; Attendance: 27,081; Referee: Christian Dingert

5 December 2015 15	1. FC Köln	0–1	FC Augsburg	Cologne
15:30 CET (UTC+01:00)	Hector (yellow card) 76'; Maroh (yellow card) 86'	Report	Verhaegh (yellow card) 54'; Feulner (yellow card) 56'; Baier (yellow card) 58'; Bobadilla 64', (yellow card) 83'	Stadium: RheinEnergieSTADION; Attendance: 45,500; Referee: Daniel Siebert

13 December 2015 16	FC Augsburg	2–1	Schalke 04	Augsburg
15:30 CET (UTC+01:00)	Kohr (yellow card) 3'; Koo (yellow card) 27'; Hong 34'; Caiuby 90+2'	Report	Kolašinac (yellow card) 32', (goal) 70'	Stadium: WWK ARENA; Attendance: 28,410; Referee: Florian Meyer

19 December 2015 17	Hamburger SV	0–1	FC Augsburg	Hamburg
15:30 CET (UTC+01:00)		Report	Esswein (yellow card) 52'; Caiuby (yellow card) 56'; Morávek 76'	Stadium: Volksparkstadion; Attendance: 49,726; Referee: Bastian Dankert

23 January 2016 18	Hertha BSC	0–0	FC Augsburg	Berlin
15:30 CET (UTC+01:00)	Ibišević (yellow card) 25'; Brooks (yellow card) 45+1'	Report	Max (yellow card) 42'; Caiuby (yellow card) 45+1'; Verhaegh (yellow card) 75'	Stadium: Olympiastadion; Attendance: 35,196; Referee: Tobias Stieler

30 January 2016 19	FC Augsburg	0–0	Eintracht Frankfurt	Augsburg
15:30 CET (UTC+01:00)	Baier (yellow card) 42'; Kohr (yellow card) 47'	Report	Abraham (yellow card) 62'; Hasebe (yellow card) 79'	Stadium: WWK ARENA; Attendance: 28,653; Referee: Sascha Stegemann

6 February 2016 20	FC Ingolstadt	2–1	FC Augsburg	Ingolstadt
15:30 CET (UTC+01:00)	Matip 59'; Groß (yellow card) 62'; Hartmann 85' (pen.); Lezcano (yellow card) 87'	Report	Stafylidis 14'; Verhaegh (yellow card) 20'; Caiuby (yellow card) 45+1'; Feulner (yellow card) 87'	Stadium: Audi Sportpark; Attendance: 15,356; Referee: Michael Weiner

14 February 2016 21	FC Augsburg	1–3	Bayern Munich	Augsburg
17:30 CET (UTC+01:00)	Bobadilla 86'	Report	Lewandowski 15', 62'; Müller (yellow card) 72', (goal) 78'	Stadium: WWK ARENA; Attendance: 30,660; Referee: Florian Meyer

21 February 2016 22	Hannover 96	0–1	FC Augsburg	Hanover
17:30 CET (UTC+01:00)	Gülselam (yellow card) 48'; Sané (yellow card) 50'	Report	Koo 14'; Kohr (yellow card) 85'; Werner (yellow card) 89'	Stadium: HDI-Arena; Attendance: 32,400; Referee: Daniel Siebert

28 February 2016 23	FC Augsburg	2–2	Borussia Mönchengladbach	Augsburg
15:30 CET (UTC+01:00)	Finnbogason 50'; Caiuby 53'	Report	Raffael 33'; Johnson 55'	Stadium: WWK ARENA; Attendance: 29,665; Referee: Knut Kircher

2 March 2016 24	TSG Hoffenheim	2–1	FC Augsburg	Sinsheim
20:00 CET (UTC+01:00)	Volland 25', (yellow card) 62'; Süle (yellow card) 39'; Uth 81'	Report	Caiuby (yellow card) 22'; Verhaegh (yellow card) 34', (goal) 40' (pen.); Hitz (yellow card) 62'; Klavan (yellow card) 90+2'	Stadium: Wirsol Rhein-Neckar-Arena; Attendance: 21,092; Referee: Guido Winkmann

5 March 2016 25	FC Augsburg	3–3	Bayer Leverkusen	Augsburg
15:30 CET (UTC+01:00)	Koo 5', 44', 57'; Hong (yellow card) 25'; Kohr (yellow card) 79'; Gouweleeuw (red card) 90+2'	Report	Bellarabi 60'; Verhaegh 80' (o.g.); Kramer (yellow card) 88'; Çalhanoğlu 90+3' (pen.)	Stadium: WWK ARENA; Attendance: 27,610; Referee: Markus Schmidt

12 March 2016 26	Darmstadt 98	2–2	FC Augsburg	Darmstadt
15:30 CET (UTC+01:00)	Vrančić 12'; Wagner 40'; Heller (yellow card) 90+1'; Holland (yellow card) 90+5'	Report	Feulner 63'; Finnbogason 90' (pen.); Max (yellow card) 90+1'	Stadium: Merck-Stadion am Böllenfalltor; Attendance: 16,000; Referee: Bastian Dankert

20 March 2016 27	FC Augsburg	1–3	Borussia Dortmund	Augsburg
17:30 CET (UTC+01:00)	Finnbogason 16'; Caiuby (yellow card) 33'; Gouweleeuw (yellow card) 87'; Kohr (yellow card) 88'; Klavan (yellow card) 90+2'	Report	Mkhitaryan (yellow card) 24', (goal) 45'; Castro 69'; Ramos 75'	Stadium: WWK ARENA; Attendance: 30,660; Referee: Christian Dingert

2 April 2016 28	Mainz 05	4–2	FC Augsburg	Mainz
15:30 CEST (UTC+02:00)	Clemens 13', 76' de Blasis 24', 53'; Bussmann (yellow card) 54'	Report	Caiuby 9'; Koo 40', (yellow card) 72'; Feulner (yellow card) 57'	Stadium: Coface Arena; Attendance: 31,780; Referee: Patrick Ittrich

9 April 2016 29	Werder Bremen	1–2	FC Augsburg	Bremen
15:30 CEST (UTC+02:00)	Grillitsch 43'; Gebre Selassie (yellow card) 68'; Fritz (yellow card) 90'	Report	Caiuby (yellow card) 12'; Opare (yellow card) 50'; Finnbogason 53', (yellow card) 70'; Max (yellow card) 72'; Janker (yellow card) 82'; Hong 87'	Stadium: Weserstadion; Attendance: 41,000; Referee: Daniel Siebert

16 April 2016 30	FC Augsburg	1–0	VfB Stuttgart	Augsburg
15:30 CEST (UTC+02:00)	Finnbogason 36'; Opare (yellow card) 67'; Kohr (yellow card) 82'	Report		Stadium: WWK ARENA; Attendance: 30,660; Referee: Tobias Stieler

23 April 2016 31	VfL Wolfsburg	0–2	FC Augsburg	Wolfsburg
15:30 CEST (UTC+02:00)		Report	Finnbogason 1'; Baier (yellow card) 54'; Altıntop 57'; Caiuby (yellow card) 90+2'	Stadium: Volkswagen Arena; Attendance: 27,261; Referee: Knut Kircher

29 April 2016 32	FC Augsburg	0–0	1. FC Köln	Augsburg
20:30 CEST (UTC+02:00)	Koo (yellow card) 62'; Altıntop (yellow card) 77'; Kohr (yellow card) 90+3'	Report	Lehmann (yellow card) 44' (yellow-red card) 56'; Jojić (yellow card) 66'; Maroh (yellow card) 84'	Stadium: WWK ARENA; Attendance: 30,144; Referee: Tobias Welz

7 May 2016 33	Schalke 04	1–1	FC Augsburg	Gelsenkirchen
15:30 CEST (UTC+02:00)	Goretzka (yellow card) 51'; Huntelaar 82'	Report	Baier (yellow card) 52', (goal) 89'; Finnbogason (yellow card) 62'; Gouweleeuw (yellow card) 69'; Caiuby (yellow card) 80'; Stafylidis (yellow card) 85'	Stadium: Veltins-Arena; Attendance: 62,271; Referee: Christian Dingert

14 May 2016 34	FC Augsburg	1–3	Hamburger SV	Augsburg
15:30 CEST (UTC+02:00)	Finnbogason 11', (yellow card) 52'; Janker (yellow card) 35'; Kohr (yellow card) 50'	Report	Gregoritsch (yellow card) 33', (goal) 36', 74'; N. Müller 62'; Holtby (yellow card) 64'; Altıntaş (yellow card) 66'	Stadium: WWK ARENA; Attendance: 30,660; Referee: Florian Meyer

=== DFB-Pokal ===
7 August 2015 Round 1	SV Elversberg	1–3 (a.e.t.)	FC Augsburg	Spiesen-Elversberg
20:00 CEST (UTC+02:00)	Maek 52'; Obernosterer (yellow card) 80' (yellow-red card) 90+3'; Kohler (yellow card) 88'	Report	Feulner (yellow card) 29'; Hitz (yellow card) 52'; Bobadilla 83'; Klavan (yellow card) 90+3'; Mölders 101'; Werner 109'	Stadium: Ursapharm-Arena an der Kaiserlinde; Attendance: 5,434; Referee: Sören Storks

28 October 2015 Round 2	SC Freiburg	0–3	FC Augsburg	Freiburg im Breisgau
19:00 CET (UTC+01:00)	Günter (yellow card) 57'	Report	Ji 11'; Esswein 25'; Baier (yellow card) 30'; Kohr (yellow card) 43'; Caiuby 50'; Matavž (yellow card) 60'	Stadium: Schwarzwald-Stadion; Attendance: 19,600; Referee: Christian Dingert

16 December 2015 Round of 16	FC Augsburg	0–2	Borussia Dortmund	Augsburg
20:30 CET (UTC+01:00)	Kohr (yellow card) 72'	Report	Aubameyang 61'; Mkhitaryan 66'	Stadium: WWK ARENA; Attendance: 30,101; Referee: Manuel Gräfe

=== UEFA Europa League ===
==== Group stage ====
Pos	Team	Pld	W	D	L	GF	GA	GD	Pts	Qualification	ATH	AUG	PAR	AZ
1	(Spain) Athletic Bilbao	6	4	1	1	16	8	+8	13	Advance to knockout phase	—	3–1	5–1	2–2
2	(Germany) FC Augsburg	6	3	0	3	12	11	+1	9	Advance to knockout phase	2–3	—	1–3	4–1
3	(Serbia) Partizan	6	3	0	3	10	14	−4	9		0–2	1–3	—	3–2
4	(Netherlands) AZ	6	1	1	4	8	13	−5	4		2–1	0–1	1–2	—

Source: Soccerway
Rules for classification: Group stage tiebreakers

17 September 2015 1	Athletic Bilbao (Spain)	3–1	(Germany) FC Augsburg	Bilbao, Spain
21:05 CEST (UTC+02:00)	Aduriz 55', 66'; García (yellow card) 57'; Beñat (yellow card) 73'; Susaeta 90'	Report	Altıntop 15'; Werner (yellow card) 71'	Stadium: San Mamés; Attendance: 37,838; Referee: Vladislav Bezborodov (Russia)

1 October 2015 2	FC Augsburg (Germany)	1–3	(Serbia) Partizan	Augsburg, Germany
19:00 CEST (UTC+02:00)	Callsen-Bracker (yellow card) 16'; Bobadilla 57', (yellow card) 90+1'; Esswein (yellow card) 59'; Hong (yellow card) 71'	Report	Jevtović (yellow card) 5'; Živković 31', 62'; Vulićević (yellow card) 41'; Fabrício 54'; Subić (yellow card) 56' (yellow-red card) 64'; Petrović (yellow card) 84'; Ostojić (yellow card) 86'	Stadium: WWK ARENA; Attendance: 22,948; Referee: Alexandru Tudor (Romania)

22 October 2015 3	AZ (Netherlands)	0–1	(Germany) FC Augsburg	Alkmaar, Netherlands
19:00 CEST (UTC+02:00)	Luckassen (yellow card) 74'	Report	Baier (yellow card) 33'; Trochowski 43'; Kohr (yellow card) 75'; Verhaegh (yellow card) 88'; Esswein (yellow card) 90+2'	Stadium: AFAS Stadion; Attendance: 16,511; Referee: Miroslav Zelinka (Czech Republic)

5 November 2015 4	FC Augsburg (Germany)	4–1	(Netherlands) AZ	Augsburg, Germany
21:05 CET (UTC+01:00)	Bobadilla 24', 33', 74'; Ji 66'; Kohr (yellow card) 72'	Report	Rienstra (yellow card) 21'; Janssen 45+1'; Haye (yellow card) 72'	Stadium: WWK ARENA; Attendance: 24,241; Referee: Bobby Madden (Scotland)

26 November 2015 5	FC Augsburg (Germany)	2–3	(Spain) Athletic Bilbao	Augsburg, Germany
19:00 CET (UTC+01:00)	Trochowski 41'; Kohr (yellow card) 47'; Esswein (yellow card) 55'; Bobadilla 59'	Report	Susaeta 10'; Aduriz 83', 86'	Stadium: WWK ARENA; Attendance: 23,741; Referee: Artur Soares Dias (Portugal)

10 December 2015 6	Partizan (Serbia)	1–3	(Germany) FC Augsburg	Belgrade, Serbia
21:05 CET (UTC+01:00)	Oumarou 11'; Ninković (yellow card) 36'; Živković (yellow card) 45+1' (yellow-red card) 80'	Report	Hong 45+2'; Verhaegh 50'; Bobadilla 89', (yellow card) 90'	Stadium: Partizan Stadium; Attendance: 14,132; Referee: Paolo Tagliavento (Italy)

==== Knockout phase ====
===== Round of 32 =====
18 February 2016 First leg	FC Augsburg (Germany)	0–0	(England) Liverpool	Augsburg, Germany
21:05 CET (UTC+01:00)	Janker (yellow card) 20'; Kohr (yellow card) 59'; Werner (yellow card) 73'; Feulner (yellow card) 90+2'	Report	Moreno (yellow card) 77'	Stadium: WWK ARENA; Attendance: 25,000; Referee: David Fernández Borbalán (Spain)

25 February 2016 Second leg	Liverpool (England)	1–0 (1–0 agg.)	(Germany) FC Augsburg	Liverpool, England
19:00 CET (UTC+01:00)	Milner 5' (pen.); Firmino (yellow card) 57'	Report	Stafylidis (yellow card) 26'; Caiuby (yellow card) 45'; Janker (yellow card) 87'	Stadium: Anfield; Attendance: 43,081; Referee: Clément Turpin (France)

== Player information ==
=== Transfers ===
==== In ====
Date	Player	From	Fee	Ref.
26 May 2015	Ronny Philp	SpVgg Greuther Fürth		
18 June 2015	Dominik Kohr	Bayer Leverkusen		
26 June 2015	Yannik Oettl	SpVgg Unterhaching		
21 July 2015	Piotr Trochowski	Sevilla		
13 August 2015	Daniel Opare	FC Porto		
20 August 2015	Kostas Stafylidis	Bayer Leverkusen		
9 January 2016	Jeffrey Gouweleeuw	AZ Alkmaar		

==== Loans in ====
Date from	Name	From	Date until	Ref
1 February 2016	Alfreð Finnbogason	Real Sociedad	End of season	

==== Out ====
Date	Player	To	Fee	Ref.
30 June 2015	Dominik Reinhardt		Released	

==== Loans out ====
Date from	Name	To	Date until	Ref
17 July 2015	Nikola Đurđić	Malmö FF	January 2016	
1 February 2016	Nikola Đurđić	Fortuna Düsseldorf	End of season	
1 February 2016	Tim Matavž	Genoa	End of season	
