= 2009–10 Hertha BSC season =

Hertha BSC
2009–10 season
- President: Werner Gegenbauer
- Manager: Lucien Favre (until 28 September 2009); Friedhelm Funkel
- Bundesliga: 18th (relegated)
- DFB-Pokal: Second round
- UEFA Europa League: Round of 32
- Top goalscorer: League: Adrián Ramos (10 goals); All: Adrián Ramos (11 goals)
- Highest home attendance: 75,420 (v. Bayern Munich)
- Lowest home attendance: 8,000 (v. Ventspils)
Home colours	Away colours	Third colours

The 2009–10 season Hertha BSC season began on 1 August 2009 with a DFB-Pokal match against Preußen Münster and ended on 8 May 2010, the last matchday of the Bundesliga, with a match against Bayern Munich. Hertha was eliminated in the second round of the DFB-Pokal by 1860 Munich, and in round of 32 in the Europa League by Benfica. The club finished in 18th and last place in the Bundesliga and was subsequently relegated.

== Transfers ==
=== Summer transfers ===
In: Note: Flags indicate national team as defined under FIFA eligibility rules; some limited exceptions apply. Players may hold more than one non-FIFA nationality.

No.	Pos.	Nation	Player
5	DF	SRB	Nemanja Pejčinović (on loan from Rad)
6	DF	GER	Christoph Janker (from 1899 Hoffenheim)
9	FW	COL	Adrián Ramos (from América de Cali)
11	MF	GER	Florian Kringe (on loan from Borussia Dortmund)
12	GK	GER	Timo Ochs (from Red Bull Salzburg)
18	FW	POL	Artur Wichniarek (from Arminia Bielefeld)
22	DF	SWE	Rasmus Bengtsson (from Trelleborg)
27	MF	BRA	César (from Al-Ahli)
31	DF	ALB	Fanol Perdedaj (from Hertha BSC Youth)

Out: Note: Flags indicate national team as defined under FIFA eligibility rules; some limited exceptions apply. Players may hold more than one non-FIFA nationality.

No.	Pos.	Nation	Player
5	DF	GER	Sofian Chahed (to Hannover 96)
6	MF	CRO	Marko Babić (to Real Zaragoza)
9	FW	SRB	Marko Pantelić (to Ajax)
11	FW	UKR	Andriy Voronin (loan return to Liverpool)
12	GK	GER	Christian Fiedler (retired)
14	DF	CRO	Josip Šimunić (to 1899 Hoffenheim)
15	DF	BRA	Rodnei (on loan to 1. FC Kaiserslautern)
16	MF	BRA	Lúcio (on loan to Grêmio)
22	DF	ARG	Leandro Cufré (loan return to Monaco)
27	FW	TUN	Amine Chermiti (on loan to Al-Ittihad)
33	FW	BRA	André Lima (on loan to Botafogo, previously on loan at São Paulo)
38	FW	FRA	Ibrahima Traoré (to FC Augsburg)
39	MF	GER	Florian Riedel (to Hertha BSC II)

=== Winter transfers ===
In: Note: Flags indicate national team as defined under FIFA eligibility rules; some limited exceptions apply. Players may hold more than one non-FIFA nationality.

No.	Pos.	Nation	Player
16	DF	CZE	Roman Hubník (on loan from FC Moscow, previously on loan at Sparta Prague)
17	FW	GRE	Theofanis Gekas (on loan from Bayer Leverkusen)
21	DF	GEO	Levan Kobiashvili (from Schalke 04)

Out: Note: Flags indicate national team as defined under FIFA eligibility rules; some limited exceptions apply. Players may hold more than one non-FIFA nationality.

No.	Pos.	Nation	Player
2	DF	BRA	Kaká (on loan to Omonia)
17	MF	USA	Bryan Arguez (released)
27	MF	BRA	César (to Al-Ahli)
33	FW	BRA	André Lima (on loan to Fluminense, previously on loan at Botafogo)

== Goals and appearances ==
No.	Pos	Nat	Player	Total		Bundesliga		DFB-Pokal		Europa League	
No.	Pos	Nat	Player	Apps	Goals	Apps	Goals	Apps	Goals	Apps	Goals
1	GK	(Czech Republic) CZE	Jaroslav Drobný	39	0	30	0	1	0	8	0
2	DF	(Brazil) BRA	Kaká^{1}	4	0	2	0	0	0	2	0
3	DF	(Germany) GER	Arne Friedrich	40	1	31	1	2	0	7	0
4	DF	(Switzerland) SUI	Steve von Bergen	34	0	25	0	1	0	8	0
5	DF	(Serbia) SRB	Nemanja Pejčinović^{2}	26	0	16	0	2	0	8	0
6	DF	(Germany) GER	Christoph Janker	24	0	15	0	1	0	8	0
7	MF	(Brazil) BRA	Cícero^{3}	41	3	30	3	2	0	9	0
8	MF	(Hungary) HUN	Pál Dárdai	23	1	16	0	2	0	5	1
9	FW	(Colombia) COL	Adrián Ramos	35	11	28	10	1	1	6	0
10	FW	(Brazil) BRA	Raffael	41	10	31	7	2	2	8	1
11	MF	(Germany) GER	Florian Kringe	15	0	12	0	0	0	3	0
12	GK	(Germany) GER	Timo Ochs	2	0	2	0	0	0	0	0
13	DF	(Germany) GER	Marc Stein	15	0	10	0	1	0	4	0
16	DF	(Czech Republic) CZE	Roman Hubník^{4}	7	0	7	0	0	0	0	0
17	MF	(United States) USA	Bryan Arguez^{5}	0	0	0	0	0	0	0	0
17	FW	(Greece) GRE	Theofanis Gekas^{6}	19	6	17	6	0	0	2	0
18	FW	(Poland) POL	Artur Wichniarek	27	1	19	0	1	0	7	1
20	MF	(Germany) GER	Patrick Ebert	23	1	16	1	2	0	5	0
21	DF	(Georgia (country)) GEO	Levan Kobiashvili^{7}	17	0	16	0	0	0	1	0
22	DF	(Sweden) SWE	Rasmus Bengtsson	9	0	6	0	1	0	2	0
23	FW	(Bulgaria) BUL	Valeri Domovchiyski	25	5	16	0	2	2	7	3
25	MF	(Romania) ROU	Maximilian Nicu	26	1	15	1	2	0	9	0
26	MF	(Poland) POL	Łukasz Piszczek	42	3	31	2	2	0	9	1
27	MF	(Brazil) BRA	César^{8}	5	0	3	0	0	0	2	0
28	MF	(Switzerland) SUI	Fabian Lustenberger	27	0	23	0	0	0	4	0
29	MF	(Germany) GER	Sascha Bigalke	3	0	1	0	0	0	2	0
30	GK	(Germany) GER	Christopher Gäng	0	0	0	0	0	0	0	0
31	MF	(Albania) ALB	Fanol Perdedaj	0	0	0	0	0	0	0	0
35	DF	(Germany) GER	Shervin Radjabali-Fardi	1	0	0	0	0	0	1	0
36	MF	(Germany) GER	Lennart Hartmann	3	0	2	0	0	0	1	0
40	GK	(Germany) GER	Sascha Burchert	7	0	3	0	1	0	3	0
44	MF	(Serbia) SRB	Gojko Kačar	30	6	22	3	2	0	6	3

Notes

- ^1 Kaká left Hertha during the winter break.
- ^2 Nemanja Pejčinović was on loan from Rad
- ^3 Cícero was on loan from Tombense.
- ^4 Roman Hubník joined Hertha during the winter break, and was on loan from FC Moscow.
- ^5 Bryan Arguez left Hertha during the winter break.
- ^6 Theofanis Gekas joined Hertha during the winter break, and was on loan from Bayer Leverkusen.
- ^7 Levan Kobiashvili joined Hertha during the winter break.
- ^8 César left Hertha during the winter break.

== International appearances ==
Appearances from 1 July 2009 – 30 June 2010 are included.

Player	Position	Country	Caps (Goals)	Caps this season
Levan Kobiashvili	DF	Georgia	88 (10)	vs. Italy^{9}, vs. Bulgaria^{9} ^{10}, vs. Estonia^{10}, vs. Cameroon
Arne Friedrich	DF	Germany	76 (0)	vs. South Africa, vs. Russia, vs. Finland, vs. Malta, vs. Hungary, vs. Bosnia and Herzegovina, vs. Australia^{11}, vs. Serbia^{11}, vs. Ghana^{11}, vs. England^{11}
Pál Dárdai	MF	Hungary	61 (5)	vs. Romania, vs. Sweden, vs. Portugal, vs. Russia
Theofanis Gekas	FW	Greece	49 (20)	vs. Poland^{9}, vs. Switzerland^{9}, vs. Moldova^{9} ^{10}, vs. Latvia^{9} ^{10}, vs Luxembourg^{9} ^{10}, vs. Ukraine^{9}, vs. Ukraine^{9}, vs. Senegal, vs. North Korea, vs. South Korea^{11}, vs. Nigeria^{11}
Gojko Kačar	MF	Serbia	18 (0)	vs. South Africa, vs. France, vs. Lithuania, vs. Northern Ireland, vs. South Korea, vs. Algeria, vs. New Zealand, vs. Poland, vs. Germany^{11}
Steve von Bergen	DF	Switzerland	14 (0)	vs. Greece, vs. Latvia, vs. Luxembourg, vs. Norway, vs. Uruguay, Costa Rica, vs. Spain^{11} vs. Chile^{11}, vs. Honduras^{11}
Valeri Domovchiyski	FW	Bulgaria	9 (1)	vs. Latvia, vs. Montenegro^{10}, vs Cyprus vs Malta
Roman Hubník	DF	Czech Republic	7 (1)	vs. Belgium^{9} ^{10}, vs. San Marino^{9}, vs. Poland^{9}, vs. Northern Ireland^{9}, vs. United Arab Emirates^{9}, vs. Scotland
Adrián Ramos	FW	Colombia	7 (1)	vs. Uruguay, vs. Paraguay ^{10}, vs. South Africa, vs. Nigeria
Maximilian Nicu	MF	Romania	3 (0)	vs. Hungary, vs. France
Jaroslav Drobný	GK	Czech Republic	3 (0)	vs. United Arab Emirates, vs. Scotland

Notes

- ^9 Match played before player joined Hertha.
- ^10 Player scored a goal in this game.
- ^11 World Cup match.

== Matches ==
=== Friendlies ===
4 July 2009	Rot-Weiß Prenzlau	2–5	Hertha BSC	Uckerstadion, Prenzlau
17:00 CEST	Kraft 33' (pen.); Presecke 86'	Report	Raffael 7', 57'; Piszczek 13'; Nicu 33'; Hartmann 45'	Attendance: 1,300

8 July 2009	Union Berlin	3–5	Hertha BSC	Alte Försterei, Berlin
20:30 CEST	Benyamina 14', 68'; Biran 90'	Report	Wichniarek 10' (pen.), 24'; Raffael 55'; Domovchiyski 73'; Chermiti 82'	Attendance: 20,000; Referee: Manuel Gräfe

11 July 2009	Wiener Neustadt	2–1	Hertha BSC	Sonnenseestadion, Ritzing
16:00 CEST	Kuljić 10'; Viana 73'	Report	Wichniarek 24'	Attendance: 770

14 July 2009	Ferencváros	0–2	Hertha BSC	Stadion Albert Flórián, Budapest
19:00 CEST		Report	Cícero 16'; Kačar 24'	Attendance: 5,000

17 July 2009	Bursaspor	1–2	Hertha BSC	Stadion Stegersbach, Stegersbach
18:00 CEST	Sal 56'	Report	Kačar 53'; Cícero 72'	Attendance: 355

20 July 2009	Ulm 1846	1–1	Hertha BSC	Donnau-Stadion, Ulm
18:00 CEST	Schmidt 61'	Report	Janker 10'	Attendance: 2,043; Referee: Herbert Fandel

25 July 2009	FC St. Pauli	2–2	Hertha BSC	Millerntor-Stadion, Hamburg
17:30 CEST	Kruse 39'; Bruns 58'	Report	Nicu 16'; Kačar 51'	Attendance: 10,486; Referee: Sascha Thielert

28 July 2009	Lübars	0–23	Hertha BSC	Stadion Finsterwalder Straße, Berlin
18:30 CEST		Report	Ebert 12', 26', 30'; Domochiyski 13', 14', 37', 43', 60' (pen.), 76'; Ayew^{12} 18', 38'; Perdedaj 21'; Kaká 25'; Perišić^{12} 35', 80'; Chermiti 41', 65', 75' (pen.), 78' (pen.); Radjabali-Fardi 68', 88'; Bigalke 81', 90'	Attendance: 2,500
Note: ^12 André Ayew and Ivan Perišić were invited to train with Hertha during the summer break.

4 September 2009	Tus Altenberge 09	0–10	Hertha BSC	Großer Berg Sportpark, Altenberge
		Report	Wichniarek 19', 38', 51'; César 30', 47'; Janker 32'; Scheffler^{13} 72', 78', 85'; Bengtsson 87'	Attendance: 2,000
Note: ^13 Tim Scheffler was called up from Hertha's U-19 team for this game.

14 November 2009	Türkiyemspor Berlin	2–3	Hertha BSC	Friedrich-Ludwig-Jahn-Sportpark, Berlin
14:00 CET	Steinwarth 64', 70' (pen.)	Report	Raffael 4'; Bigalke 88'; Rommel^{14} 90'	Attendance: 500
Note: ^14 Dennis Rommel was called up from Hertha BSC II for this game.

6 January 2010	Mallorca II	1–2	Hertha BSC	ONO Estadi, Majorca
15:30 CET	Jaime 6'	Report	Kringe 39'; Domovshiyski 50'	Attendance: 180

9 January 2010	Hertha BSC	1–1	FSV Frankfurt	ONO Estadi, Majorca
11:30 CET	Raffael 41'	Report	Gjasula 57'	Attendance: 70

=== Bundesliga ===
8 August 2009 1	Hertha BSC	1–0	Hannover 96	Olympiastadion, Berlin
15:30 CEST	Kačar 82'	Report		Attendance: 40,000; Referee: Guido Winkmann (Kerken)

16 August 2009 2	Borussia Mönchengladbach	2–1	Hertha BSC	Borussia Park, Mönchengladbach
15:30 CEST	Brouwers 23'; Matmour 52'	Report	Kačar 53'	Attendance: 40,000; Referee: Markus Schmidt (Stuttgart)

23 August 2009 3	VfL Bochum	1–0	Hertha BSC	rewirpowerSTADION, Bochum
15:30 CEST	Yahia 47'	Report		Attendance: 18,800; Referee: Dr. Felix Brych (Munich)

30 August 2009 4	Hertha BSC	2–3	Werder Bremen	Olympiastadion, Berlin
15:30 CEST	Piszczek 77'; Ebert 90+1'	Report	Özil 57'; Borowski 74'; Naldo 83'	Attendance: 49,176; Referee: Thornsten Kinhöfer (Herne)

12 September 2009 5	Mainz 05	2–1	Hertha BSC	Stadion am Bruchweg, Mainz
15:30 CEST	Ivanschitz 80' (pen.); Bancé 85'	Report	Nicu 50'	Attendance: 20,000; Referee: Florian Meyer (Burgdorf)

20 September 2009 6	Hertha BSC	0–4	SC Freiburg	Olympiastadion, Berlin
17:30 CEST		Report	Banović 6', 67'; Makiadi 12'; Idrissou 42'	Attendance: 30,000; Referee: Deniz Aytekin (Oberasbach)

27 September 2009 7	1899 Hoffenheim	5–1	Hertha BSC	Rhein-Neckar-Arena, Sinsheim
17:30 CEST	Ibišević 1', 4', 21'; Obasi 58'; Carlos Eduardo 63' (pen.)		Raffael 45+1'	Attendance: 29,600; Referee: Peter Sippel (Munich)

4 October 2009 8	Hertha BSC	1–3	Hamburger SV	Olympiastadion, Berlin
17:30 CEST	Friedrich 9'	Report	Kaká 24' (o.g.); Jarolím 38'; Zé Roberto 40'	Attendance: 42,000; Referee: Günter Perl (Munich)

17 October 2009 9	1. FC Nürnberg	3–0	Hertha BSC	Frankenstadion, Nuremberg
15:30 CEST	Gygax 18'; Bunjaku 26', 60'			Attendance: 38,094; Referee: Thorsten Kinhöfer (Herne)

25 October 2009 10	Hertha BSC	0–0	VfL Wolfsburg	Olympiastadion, Berlin
15:30 CET		Report		Attendance: 36,799; Referee: Lutz Wagner (Kriftel)

30 October 2009 11	Borussia Dortmund	2–0	Hertha BSC	Signal Iduna Park, Dortmund
20:30 CET	Şahin 60' (pen.); Barrios 90+1'	Report		Referee: Dr. Felix Brych (Munich)

8 November 2009 12	Hertha BSC	0–1	1. FC Köln	Olympiastadion, Berlin
17:30 CET		Report	Novaković 79'	Attendance: 48,623; Referee: Babak Rafati (Hanover)

21 November 2009 13	VfB Stuttgart	1–1	Hertha BSC	Mercedes-Benz Arena, Stuttgart
15:30 CET	Kuzmanović 82'	Report	Ramos 49'	Attendance: 30,000; Referee: Peter Gagelmann (Bremen)

28 November 2009 14	Hertha BSC	1–3	Eintracht Frankfurt	Olympiastadion, Berlin
15:30 CET	Ramos 81'	Report	Ochs 11'; Franz 70'; Meier 75'	Attendance: 48,253; Referee: Helmut Fleischer (Sigmertshausen)

6 December 2009 15	Schalke 04	2–0	Hertha BSC	Arena AufSchalke, Gelsenkirchen
17:30 CET	Kurányi 59'; Rafinha 90+2' (pen.)	Report		Attendance: 61,000; Referee: Knut Kircher (Rottenburg)

11 December 2009 16	Hertha BSC	2–2	Bayer Leverkusen	Olympiastadion, Berlin
20:30 CET	Ramos 8', 90+2'	Report	Kroos 76'; Kaplan 90'	Attendance: 40,474; Referee: Babak Rafati (Hanover)

19 December 2009 17	Bayern Munich	5–2	Hertha BSC	Allianz Arena, Munich
15:30 CET	Van Buyten 16'; Gómez 31'; Robben 33'; Müller 60'; Olić 77'	Report	Ramos 71'; Raffael 90'	Attendance: 69,000; Referee: Marco Fritz (Korb)

16 January 2010 18	Hannover 96	0–3	Hertha BSC	AWD-Arena, Hanover
15:30 CET		Report	Piszczek 30'; Raffael 33'; Gekas 80'	Attendance: 28,712; Referee: Peter Gagelmann (Bremen)

23 January 2010 19	Hertha BSC	0–0	Borussia Mönchengladbach	Olympiastadion, Berlin
15:30 CET		Report		Attendance: 46,090; Referee: Markus Schmidt (Stuttgart)

30 January 2010 20	Hertha BSC	0–0	VfL Bochum	Olympiastadion, Berlin
15:30 CET		Report		Attendance: 38,127; Referee: Michael Weiner

5 February 2010 21	Werder Bremen	2–1	Hertha BSC	Weserstadion, Bremen
20:30 CET	Marin 66'; Pizzaro 81'	Report	Gekas 68'	Attendance: 35,600; Referee: Günter Perl (Munich)

13 February 2010 22	Hertha BSC	1 –1	Mainz 05	Olympiastadion, Berlin
15:30 CET	Ramos 51'	Report	Bancé 37'	Attendance: 36,715; Referee: Felix Brych (Munich)

21 February 2010 23	SC Freiburg	0–3	Hertha BSC	Badenova Stadion, Freiburg
15:30 CET		Report	Ramos 28'; Cícero 35', 56'	Attendance: 21,600; Referee: Guido Winkmann (Kerken)

27 February 2010 24	Hertha BSC	0–2	1899 Hoffenheim	Olympiastadion, Berlin
15:30 CET		Report	Ba 35'; Ibišević 90+2'	Attendance: 37,391; Referee: Thorsten Kinhöfer (Herne)

6 March 2010 25	Hamburger SV	1–0	Hertha BSC	HSH Nordbank Arena, Hamburg
15:30 CET	Jansen 40'	Report		Attendance: 55,000; Referee: Helmut Fleischer (Sigmertshausen)

13 March 2010 26	Hertha BSC	1–2	1. FC Nürnberg	Olympiastadion, Berlin
15:30 CET	Gekas 36'	Report	Bunjaku 61'; Charisteas 90+1'	Attendance: 57,761; Referee: Knut Kircher (Rottenburg)

21 March 2010 27	VfL Wolfsburg	1–5	Hertha BSC	Volkswagen Arena, Wolfsburg
17:30 CET	Grafite 36'	Report	Gekas 6', 26', 63'; Ramos 8', 84'	Attendance: 29,353; Referee: Peter Sippel (Munich)

27 March 2010 28	Hertha BSC	0–0	Borussia Dortmund	Olympiastadion, Berlin
15:30 CET		Report		Attendance: 60,441; Referee: Lutz Wagner (Kriftel)

4 April 2010 29	1. FC Köln	0–3	Hertha BSC	RheinEnergieStadion, Cologne
18:30 CEST		Report	Raffael 25', 45+1'; Cícero 75'	Referee: Peter Gagelman (Bremen)

10 April 2010 30	Hertha BSC	0–1	VfB Stuttgart	Olympiastadion, Berlin
15:30 CEST		Report	Cacau 74'	Attendance: 26,851; Referee: Michael Weiner (Giesen)

18 April 2010 31	Eintracht Frankfurt	2–2	Hertha BSC	Commerzbank Arena, Frankfurt
17:30 CEST	Korkmaz 37'; Russ 63'	Report	Kačar 17'; Raffael 43'	Attendance: 47,000; Referee: Felix Brych (Munich)

24 April 2010 32	Hertha BSC	0–1	Schalke 04	Olympiastadion, Berlin
15:30 CEST		Report	Westermann 87'	Attendance: 61,902; Referee: Jochen Drees (Münster)

1 May 2010 33	Bayer Leverkusen	1–1	Hertha BSC	BayArena, Leverkusen
15:30 CET	Friedrich 59'	Report	Raffael 12'	Attendance: 30,210; Referee: Peter Sippel (Munich)

8 May 2010 34	Hertha BSC	1–3	Bayern Munich	Olympiastadion, Berlin
15:30 CET	Ramos 60'	Report	Olić 20'; Robben 74', 87'	Attendance: 75,420; Referee: Florian Meyer (Burgdorf)

=== DFB-Pokal ===
1 August 2009 first round	Preußen Münster	1–3 (a.e.t.)	Hertha BSC	Preußenstadion, Münster
19:30 CEST	Lorenz 53'	Report	Raffael 23', 120'; Domovchiyski 118'	Attendance: 18,200; Referee: Frank Willenborg (Osnabrück)

22 September 2009 second round	1860 Munich	2–2 (a.e.t.) (4–1 p)	Hertha BSC	Allianz Arena, Munich
19:00 CEST	Bengtsson 10' (o.g.); Cooper 50'	Report	Ramos 76'; Domovchiyski 79'	Attendance: 17,000; Referee: Knut Kircher (Rottenburg)
	Penalties
	Hoffmann (penalty scored); Ludwig (penalty scored); Mlapa (penalty scored); Felhi (penalty scored)		Kačar (penalty missed); Janker (penalty missed); Domovchiyski (penalty scored)

=== UEFA Europa League ===
20 August 2009 Play-off round (1st Leg)	Brøndby	2–1	Hertha BSC	Brøndby Stadium, Copenhagen
20:30 CEST	Bischoff 52'; Pejčinović 70' (o.g.)	Report	Domovchiyski 53'	Attendance: 12,050; Referee: Kevin Blom (Netherlands)

27 August 2009 Play-off Round (2nd Leg)	Hertha BSC	3–1	Brøndby	Friedrich-Ludwig-Jahn-Sportpark, Berlin
18:15 CEST	Kačar 75', 86'; Dárdai 80'	Report	Rasmussen 52'	Referee: Paolo Tagliavento (Italy)

17 September 2009 Group Phase Match 1	Hertha BSC	1–1	Ventspils	Olympiastadion, Berlin
19:00 CEST	Piszczek 34'	Report	Gauracs 48'	Attendance: 10,000; Referee: Alan Kelly (Ireland)

1 October 2009 Group Phase Match 2	Sporting CP	1–0	Hertha BSC	Estádio José Alvalade, Lisbon
21:05 CEST	Silva 18'	Report		Attendance: 16,197; Referee: Serge Guimenny (Belgium)

22 October 2009 Group Phase Match 3	Hertha BSC	0–1	Heerenveen	Olympiastadion, Berlin
21:05 CEST		Report	Losada 36'	Attendance: 10,000; Referee: Costas Kapitanis (Cyprus)

5 November 2009 Group Phase Match 4	Heerenveen	2–3	Hertha BSC	Abe Lenstra Stadion, Heerenveen
19:00 CET	Papadopulos 3', 36'	Report	Domovchiyski 21', 52'; Wichniarek 90+1'	Attendance: 18,000; Referee: Pavel Cristian Bala (Romania)

3 December 2009 Group Phase Match 5	Ventspils	0–1	Hertha BSC	Skonto stadions, Riga
21:05 CET		Report	Raffael 12'	Attendance: 8,000; Referee: Istvan Vad (Hungary)

16 December 2009 Group Phase Match 6	Hertha BSC	1–0	Sporting CP	Olympiastadion, Berlin
19:00 CET	Kačar 70'	Report		Attendance: 14,417; Referee: Aleksei Kulbakov (Belarus)

18 February 2010 round of 32 (first leg)	Hertha BSC	1–1	Benfica	Olympiastadion, Berlin
20:05 CET	García 33' (o.g.)	Report	Di María 4'	Attendance: 13,684; Referee: Terje Hauge (Norway)

23 February 2010 round of 32 (second leg)	Benfica	4–0	Hertha BSC	Estádio da Luz, Lisbon
18:00 CET	Aimar 25'; Cardozo 48', 62'; García 59'	Report		Attendance: 30,401; Referee: Pieter Vink (Netherlands)
