= 2016–17 FC Augsburg season =

FC Augsburg
2016–17 season
- Chairman: Walther Seinsch
- Manager: Dirk Schuster (until 14 December); Manuel Baum (interim, 14–28 December; head coach, from 28 December)
- Stadium: WWK ARENA
- Bundesliga: 13th
- DFB-Pokal: Second round
- Top goalscorer: League: Halil Altıntop (6); All: Halil Altıntop (6)
- Highest home attendance: 30,660
- Lowest home attendance: 24,515
- Average home league attendance: 28,172
- Biggest win: Augsburg 4–0 Hamburg
- Biggest defeat: Bayern Munich 6–0 Augsburg
| Home colours | Away colours | Third colours |
- All statistics correct as of 27 May 2017.

The 2016–17 FC Augsburg season was the 110th season in the club's history and 6th consecutive and overall season in the top flight of German football, the Bundesliga, having been promoted from the 2. Bundesliga in 2011. In addition to the Bundesliga, FC Augsburg also participated in the DFB-Pokal. This was the 8th season in which Augsburg played at the WWK Arena, located in Augsburg, Bavaria, Germany. The season covers a period from 1 July 2016 to 30 June 2017.

After a mixed campaign, Augsburg finished in 13th place on 38 points, whilst they were knocked out of the DFB-Pokal by eventual semi-finalists and Bundesliga champions Bayern Munich.

== Players ==
=== Squad ===
Note: Flags indicate national team as defined under FIFA eligibility rules; some limited exceptions apply. Players may hold more than one non-FIFA nationality.

| No. | Pos. | Nation | Player |
|---|---|---|---|
| 1 | GK | GER | Andreas Luthe |
| 2 | DF | NED | Paul Verhaegh (captain) |
| 3 | DF | GRE | Kostas Stafylidis |
| 5 | MF | GER | Moritz Leitner |
| 6 | DF | NED | Jeffrey Gouweleeuw |
| 7 | FW | TUR | Halil Altıntop |
| 8 | MF | GER | Markus Feulner |
| 10 | MF | GER | Daniel Baier |
| 11 | MF | FRA | Jonathan Schmid |
| 14 | MF | CZE | Jan Morávek |
| 15 | DF | GER | Marvin Friedrich |
| 16 | DF | GER | Christoph Janker |
| 18 | DF | GER | Jan-Ingwer Callsen-Bracker |
| 19 | MF | KOR | Koo Ja-cheol |
| 20 | MF | SRB | Gojko Kačar |
| 21 | MF | GER | Dominik Kohr |
| 22 | FW | KOR | Ji Dong-won |

| No. | Pos. | Nation | Player |
|---|---|---|---|
| 24 | GK | GRE | Ioannis Gelios |
| 25 | FW | PAR | Raúl Bobadilla |
| 26 | MF | GER | Bastian Kurz |
| 27 | FW | ISL | Alfreð Finnbogason |
| 28 | MF | AUT | Georg Teigl |
| 29 | MF | GER | Marco Schuster |
| 30 | MF | BRA | Caiuby |
| 31 | DF | GER | Philipp Max |
| 32 | DF | GER | Raphael Framberger |
| 33 | FW | GER | Julian Günther-Schmidt |
| 34 | MF | ITA | Max Reinthaler |
| 35 | GK | SUI | Marwin Hitz |
| 36 | DF | AUT | Martin Hinteregger |
| 37 | MF | TUR | Arif Ekin |
| 38 | MF | AUT | Kevin Danso |
| 39 | FW | JPN | Takashi Usami |
| 40 | DF | GER | Tim Rieder |

== Friendly matches ==
Win Draw Loss

| 3 July 2016 Friendly | 1. FC Sonthofen | 0–2 | FC Augsburg | Sonthofen, Germany |
| 15:00 CEST (UTC+2) | | Report | Bobadilla 68'; Usami 74' | Stadium: Werbe Blank Sports Arena; Attendance: 1,300 |

| 13 July 2016 Friendly | FV Illertissen | 0–3 | FC Augsburg | Illertissen, Germany |
| 19:00 CEST (UTC+2) | | Report | Caiuby 19'; Ajeti 72'; Matavž 85' | Stadium: Vöhlin-Stadion; Attendance: 2,000 |

| 18 July 2016 Friendly | FC Augsburg | 0–2 | SV Sandhausen | Mindelheim, Germany |
| 18:00 CEST (UTC+2) | | Report | Karl 21'; Pledl 47' | Stadium: Julius-Strohmayer-Stadion; Attendance: 2,000 |

| 23 July 2016 Friendly | FC Augsburg | 0–0 | Sparta Rotterdam | Wangen im Allgäu, Germany |
| 17:30 CEST (UTC+2) | | Report | | Stadium: Allgäustadion; Attendance: 1,000 |

| 29 July 2016 Friendly | 1. FC Nürnberg | 2–1 | FC Augsburg | Nuremberg, Germany |
| 19:00 CEST (UTC+2) | Salli 63'; Burgstaller 75' (pen.) | Report | Verhaegh 60' (pen.) | Stadium: Stadion Nürnberg; Attendance: 8,434; Referee: Robert Hartmann |

| 4 August 2016 Friendly | Südtirol | 0–4 | FC Augsburg | Mals, Italy |
| 17:00 CEST (UTC+2) | | Report | Koo 20', 37'; Kohr 72'; Schuster 85' | Stadium: Sportzone; Attendance: 1,000 |

| 12 August 2016 Friendly | Vaduz | 0–0 | FC Augsburg | Germaringen, Germany |
| 18:30 CEST (UTC+2) | | | | Stadium: Germaringer Sportpark; Attendance: 1,000 |

== Competitions ==
Win Draw Loss

=== Overview ===
| Competition | First match | Last match | Starting round | Final position | Record | | | | | | | |
| Competition | First match | Last match | Starting round | Final position | Pld | W | D | L | GF | GA | GD | Win % |
|---|---|---|---|---|---|---|---|---|---|---|---|---|
| Bundesliga | 27 August 2016 | 20 May 2017 | Matchday 1 | 13th | 34 | 9 | 11 | 14 | 35 | 51 | −16 | 26.47 |
| DFB-Pokal | 19 August 2016 | 26 October 2016 | First round | Second round | 2 | 1 | 0 | 1 | 3 | 3 | +0 | 50.00 |
| Total | | | | | 36 | 10 | 11 | 15 | 38 | 54 | −16 | 27.78 |

Last updated: 27 May 2017
Source: Competitions

=== Bundesliga ===
==== League table ====
| Pos | Team | Pld | W | D | L | GF | GA | GD | Pts |
|---|---|---|---|---|---|---|---|---|---|
| 11 | Eintracht Frankfurt | 34 | 11 | 9 | 14 | 36 | 43 | −7 | 42 |
| 12 | Bayer Leverkusen | 34 | 11 | 8 | 15 | 53 | 55 | −2 | 41 |
| 13 | FC Augsburg | 34 | 9 | 11 | 14 | 35 | 51 | −16 | 38 |
| 14 | Hamburger SV | 34 | 10 | 8 | 16 | 33 | 61 | −28 | 38 |
| 15 | Mainz 05 | 34 | 10 | 7 | 17 | 44 | 55 | −11 | 37 |

Source: DFB
Rules for classification: 1) Points; 2) Goal difference; 3) Goals scored; 4) Head-to-head points; 5) Head-to-head goal difference; 6) Head-to-head away goals scored; 7) Away goals scored; 8) Play-off.

==== Results summary ====
| Overall | | | | | | | | Home | | | | | | Away | | | | | |
| Pld | W | D | L | GF | GA | GD | Pts | W | D | L | GF | GA | GD | W | D | L | GF | GA | GD |
|---|---|---|---|---|---|---|---|---|---|---|---|---|---|---|---|---|---|---|---|
| 34 | 9 | 11 | 14 | 35 | 51 | −16 | 38 | 5 | 6 | 6 | 22 | 25 | −3 | 4 | 5 | 8 | 13 | 26 | −13 |

Last updated: 27 May 2017.
Source: Bundesliga

==== Results by round ====
| Round | 1 | 2 | 3 | 4 | 5 | 6 | 7 | 8 | 9 | 10 | 11 | 12 | 13 | 14 | 15 | 16 | 17 | 18 | 19 | 20 | 21 | 22 | 23 | 24 | 25 | 26 | 27 | 28 | 29 | 30 | 31 | 32 | 33 | 34 |
|---|---|---|---|---|---|---|---|---|---|---|---|---|---|---|---|---|---|---|---|---|---|---|---|---|---|---|---|---|---|---|---|---|---|---|
| Ground | H | A | H | A | H | A | H | A | H | A | H | A | H | A | H | A | H | A | H | A | H | A | H | A | H | A | H | A | H | A | H | A | H | A |
| Result | L | W | L | D | W | L | D | L | L | W | D | D | D | L | W | D | L | W | W | L | L | W | D | L | D | L | L | L | W | L | W | D | D | D |
| Position | 16 | 11 | 13 | 13 | 11 | 12 | 12 | 12 | 13 | 13 | 12 | 12 | 12 | 13 | 12 | 12 | 13 | 12 | 10 | 13 | 13 | 13 | 12 | 13 | 14 | 16 | 16 | 16 | 16 | 16 | 13 | 13 | 14 | 13 |

Updated to match(es) played on 27 May 2017. Source: Bundesliga
A = Away; H = Home; W = Win; D = Draw; L = Loss

==== Matches ====
| 27 August 2016 1 | FC Augsburg | 0–2 | VfL Wolfsburg | Augsburg |
| 15:30 CEST (UTC+2) | Kohr (yellow card) 66' | Report | Gerhardt (yellow card) 31'; Didavi 35'; Bruma (yellow card) 62'; Rodríguez 89' | Stadium: WWK ARENA; Attendance: 26,172; Referee: Sascha Stegemann |

| 11 September 2016 2 | Werder Bremen | 1–2 | FC Augsburg | Bremen |
| 15:30 CEST (UTC+2) | Fritz (yellow card) 10'; Gebre Selassie (yellow card) 25'; Jóhannsson 45+2' (pen.) | Report | Stafylidis (yellow card) 15', (goal) 73'; Gouweleeuw 52', (yellow card) 56'; Caiuby (yellow card) 87' | Stadium: Weser-Stadion; Attendance: 39,430; Referee: Daniel Siebert |

| 18 September 2016 3 | FC Augsburg | 1–3 | Mainz 05 | Augsburg |
| 15:30 CEST (UTC+2) | Stafylidis 73'; Gouweleeuw (yellow card) 77' | Report | Córdoba 7', (yellow card) 49'; Mallı 75'; Onisiwo (yellow card) 76'; Muto 81'; Rodríguez (red card) 90+3' | Stadium: WWK ARENA; Attendance: 26,115; Referee: Bastian Dankert |

| 21 September 2016 4 | Bayer Leverkusen | 0–0 | FC Augsburg | Leverkusen |
| 20:00 CEST (UTC+2) | | Report | Verhaegh (yellow card) 46'; Gouweleeuw (yellow card) 71' | Stadium: BayArena; Attendance: 24,097; Referee: Jochen Drees |

| 24 September 2016 5 | FC Augsburg | 1–0 | Darmstadt 98 | Augsburg |
| 15:30 CEST (UTC+2) | Ji (yellow card) 37'; Finnbogason 47'; Verhaegh (yellow card) 86' | Report | Niemeyer (yellow card) 31'; Guwara (yellow card) 41' (yellow-red card) 45+3' | Stadium: WWK ARENA; Attendance: 28,113; Referee: Guido Winkmann |

| 30 September 2016 6 | RB Leipzig | 2–1 | FC Augsburg | Leipzig |
| 20:30 CEST (UTC+2) | Forsberg 11'; Poulsen 52' | Report | Ji 14'; Koo (yellow card) 26'; Kačar (yellow card) 53'; Hinteregger (yellow card) 84' | Stadium: Red Bull Arena; Attendance: 35,721; Referee: Harm Osmers |

| 15 October 2016 7 | FC Augsburg | 1–1 | Schalke 04 | Augsburg |
| 15:30 CEST (UTC+2) | Stafylidis (yellow card) 21'; Altıntop (yellow card) 39'; Baier 77' | Report | Geis (yellow card) 27'; Höwedes (yellow card) 55'; Bentaleb 65'; Konoplyanka (yellow card) 87' | Stadium: WWK ARENA; Attendance: 30,660; Referee: Tobias Stieler |

| 22 October 2016 8 | SC Freiburg | 2–1 | FC Augsburg | Freiburg im Breisgau |
| 15:30 CEST (UTC+2) | Bulut (yellow card) 54'; Philipp 66'; Petersen 78' | Report | Altıntop 84' | Stadium: Schwarzwald-Stadion; Attendance: 24,000; Referee: Manuel Gräfe |

| 29 October 2016 9 | FC Augsburg | 1–3 | Bayern Munich | Augsburg |
| 15:30 CEST (UTC+2) | Koo (yellow card) 35', (goal) 67'; Teigl (yellow card) 75' | Report | Lewandowski 19', 48'; Robben 21' | Stadium: WWK ARENA; Attendance: 30,660; Referee: Christian Dingert |

| 5 November 2016 10 | FC Ingolstadt | 0–2 | FC Augsburg | Ingolstadt |
| 15:30 CET (UTC+1) | Lex (yellow card) 12'; Brégerie (yellow card) 84'; Levels (red card) 89' | Report | Max (yellow card) 62'; Bobadilla 85'; Altıntop 90' | Stadium: Audi Sportpark; Attendance: 15,200; Referee: Jochen Drees |

| 19 November 2016 11 | FC Augsburg | 0–0 | Hertha BSC | Augsburg |
| 15:30 CET (UTC+1) | Kohr (yellow card) 28'; Baier (yellow card) 71'; Ji (yellow card) 85' | Report | Ibišević (yellow card) 84' | Stadium: WWK ARENA; Attendance: 27,007; Referee: Bastian Dankert |

| 26 November 2016 12 | 1. FC Köln | 0–0 | FC Augsburg | Cologne |
| 15:30 CET (UTC+1) | Heintz (yellow card) 20'; Hector (yellow card) 41' | Report | Ji (yellow card) 29'; Janker (yellow card) 36'; Baier (yellow card) 39' | Stadium: RheinEnergieSTADION; Attendance: 50,000; Referee: Markus Schmidt |

| 4 December 2016 13 | FC Augsburg | 1–1 | Eintracht Frankfurt | Augsburg |
| 17:30 CET (UTC+1) | Janker (yellow card) 3'; Max (yellow card) 33'; Ji 34'; Kohr (yellow card) 80' | Report | Hrgota 11'; Vallejo (yellow card) 28'; Hasebe (yellow card) 37' | Stadium: WWK ARENA; Attendance: 26,549; Referee: Sascha Stegemann |

| 10 December 2016 14 | Hamburger SV | 1–0 | FC Augsburg | Hamburg |
| 15:30 CET (UTC+1) | Holtby (red card) 44'; Djourou (yellow card) 62'; Kostić 68' | Report | Hinteregger (yellow card) 23'; Schmid (yellow card) 46'; Kohr (yellow card) 57' (yellow-red card) 66'; Stafylidis (yellow card) 74' | Stadium: Volksparkstadion; Attendance: 45,793; Referee: Daniel Siebert |

| 17 December 2016 15 | FC Augsburg | 1–0 | Borussia Mönchengladbach | Augsburg |
| 15:30 CET (UTC+1) | Hinteregger 75' | Report | | Stadium: WWK ARENA; Attendance: 28,653; Referee: Tobias Stieler |

| 20 December 2016 16 | Borussia Dortmund | 1–1 | FC Augsburg | Dortmund |
| 20:00 CET (UTC+1) | Dembélé 47'; Kagawa (yellow card) 69' | Report | Ji 33'; Baier (yellow card) 52'; Stafylidis (yellow card) 65' | Stadium: SIGNAL IDUNA PARK; Attendance: 81,360; Referee: Guido Winkmann |

| 21 January 2017 17 | FC Augsburg | 0–2 | 1899 Hoffenheim | Augsburg |
| 15:30 CET (UTC+1) | Stafylidis (yellow card) 10'; Koo (yellow card) 39'; Kohr (yellow card) 50' | Report | Demirbay (yellow card) 15'; Ochs (yellow card) 21'; Süle (yellow card) 36'; Wagner 47'; Kramarić 64'; Schär (yellow card) 90' | Stadium: WWK ARENA; Attendance: 24,515; Referee: Markus Schmidt |

| 28 January 2017 18 | VfL Wolfsburg | 1–2 | FC Augsburg | Wolfsburg |
| 15:30 CET (UTC+1) | Gómez 4'; Vieirinha (yellow card) 68'; Luiz Gustavo (yellow card) 89' | Report | Max (yellow card) 9'; Altıntop 25'; Kohr 69'; Koo (yellow card) 83' | Stadium: VOLKSWAGEN ARENA; Attendance: 24,811; Referee: Bastian Dankert |

| 5 February 2017 19 | FC Augsburg | 3–2 | Werder Bremen | Augsburg |
| 15:30 CET (UTC+1) | Schmid 28'; Kohr (yellow card) 49'; Hinteregger (yellow card) 64'; Koo 79'; Bobadilla 90+4', (yellow card) 90+4' | Report | Gebre Selassie 26'; U. Garcia (yellow card) 54'; Kruse 65' (pen.); Veljković (yellow card) 87' | Stadium: WWK ARENA; Attendance: 26,812; Referee: Christian Dingert |

| 10 February 2017 20 | Mainz 05 | 2–0 | FC Augsburg | Mainz |
| 20:30 CET (UTC+1) | Öztunalı 31'; Latza (yellow card) 49'; Jairo 62' (pen.) | Report | Hitz (yellow card) 60'; Hinteregger (yellow card) 71'; Gouweleeuw (yellow card) 73' | Stadium: OPEL ARENA; Attendance: 23,371; Referee: Manuel Gräfe |

| 17 February 2017 21 | FC Augsburg | 1–3 | Bayer Leverkusen | Augsburg |
| 20:30 CET (UTC+1) | Max (yellow card) 45'; Kohr 60', (yellow card) 87'; Verhaegh (yellow card) 61' | Report | Bellarabi 23'; Hernández 40', 65'; Wendell (yellow card) 76' | Stadium: WWK ARENA; Attendance: 25,010; Referee: Harm Osmers |

| 25 February 2017 22 | Darmstadt 98 | 1–2 | FC Augsburg | Darmstadt |
| 15:30 CET (UTC+1) | Heller 47', (yellow card) 88' | Report | Verhaegh 55' (pen.); Bobadilla 85' | Stadium: Jonathan-Heimes-Stadion am Böllenfalltor; Attendance: 16,200; Referee: Jochen Drees |

| 3 March 2017 23 | FC Augsburg | 2–2 | RB Leipzig | Augsburg |
| 20:30 CET (UTC+1) | Stafylidis 19'; Morávek (yellow card) 33'; Ji (yellow card) 41'; Kohr (yellow card) 45+2'; Hinteregger 60'; Hitz (yellow card) 68' | Report | Werner 25'; Keïta (yellow card) 31'; Compper 52'; Ilsanker (yellow card) 84' | Stadium: WWK ARENA; Attendance: 28,314; Referee: Patrick Ittrich |

| 12 March 2017 24 | Schalke 04 | 3–0 | FC Augsburg | Gelsenkirchen |
| 15:30 CET (UTC+1) | Burgstaller 4', 29'; Höwedes (yellow card) 31'; Caligiuri 34'; Bentaleb (yellow card) 57'; Aogo (yellow card) 78' | Report | | Stadium: VELTINS-Arena; Attendance: 59,481; Referee: Robert Kampka |

| 18 March 2017 25 | FC Augsburg | 1–1 | SC Freiburg | Augsburg |
| 15:30 CET (UTC+1) | Hitz (yellow card) 29'; Stafylidis 38'; Koo (yellow card) 41' | Report | Niederlechner 30' (pen.); Günter (yellow card) 33'; Ignjovski (yellow card) 90' | Stadium: WWK ARENA; Attendance: 28,843; Referee: Sascha Stegemann |

| 1 April 2017 26 | Bayern Munich | 6–0 | FC Augsburg | Munich |
| 15:30 CEST (UTC+2) | Lewandowski 17', 55', 79'; Müller 36', 80'; Thiago 62' | Report | Kohr (yellow card) 12'; Janker (yellow card) 81' | Stadium: Allianz Arena; Attendance: 75,000; Referee: Christian Dingert |

| 5 April 2017 27 | FC Augsburg | 2–3 | FC Ingolstadt | Augsburg |
| 20:00 CEST (UTC+2) | Koo (yellow card) 45'; Morávek (yellow card) 66'; Verhaegh 76' (pen.); Hinteregger (yellow card) 80'; Altıntop 81' | Report | Kittel 24'; Cohen 35', 67'; Hadergjonaj (yellow card) 64'; Roger (yellow card) 75' | Stadium: WWK ARENA; Attendance: 29,528; Referee: Marco Fritz |

| 9 April 2017 28 | Hertha BSC | 2–0 | FC Augsburg | Berlin |
| 15:30 CEST (UTC+2) | Brooks 12'; Stocker 37'; Darida (yellow card) 79' | Report | Kohr (yellow card) 42'; Janker (yellow card) 82' | Stadium: Olympiastadion Berlin; Attendance: 43,451; Referee: Tobias Stieler |

| 15 April 2017 29 | FC Augsburg | 2–1 | 1. FC Köln | Augsburg |
| 15:30 CEST (UTC+2) | Hinteregger 5'; Verhaegh (yellow card) 16', (goal) 23' (pen.); Koo (yellow card) 60' (yellow-red card) 89'; Kohr (yellow card) 80'; Finnbogason (red card) 90+2' | Report | Lehmann (yellow card) 34'; Max 65' (o.g.); Hector (yellow card) 82'; Klünter (yellow card) 90+2' | Stadium: WWK ARENA; Attendance: 30,660; Referee: Guido Winkmann |

| 22 April 2017 30 | Eintracht Frankfurt | 3–1 | FC Augsburg | Frankfurt |
| 15:30 CEST (UTC+2) | Rebić (yellow card) 55', (goal) 90+1'; Fabián 78', 87'; Abraham (yellow card) 88' | Report | Gouweleeuw 9'; Hitz (yellow card) 56' | Stadium: Commerzbank-Arena; Attendance: 50,200; Referee: Felix Zwayer |

| 30 April 2017 31 | FC Augsburg | 4–0 | Hamburger SV | Augsburg |
| 15:30 CEST (UTC+2) | Altıntop 28', 42'; Baier (yellow card) 48'; Max 76'; Bobadilla 85' | Report | Mavraj (yellow card) 33'; Gregoritsch (yellow card) 44'; Ostrzolek (yellow card) 51'; Holtby (yellow card) 72' | Stadium: WWK ARENA; Attendance: 30,660; Referee: Manuel Gräfe |

| 6 May 2017 32 | Borussia Mönchengladbach | 1–1 | FC Augsburg | Mönchengladbach |
| 15:30 CEST (UTC+2) | Stindl (yellow card) 78'; Hahn (yellow card) 90', (goal) 90+4' | Report | Finnbogason (yellow card) 23', (goal) 57'; Kohr (yellow card) 87' | Stadium: BORUSSIA-PARK; Attendance: 52,362; Referee: Bastian Dankert |

| 13 May 2017 33 | FC Augsburg | 1–1 | Borussia Dortmund | Augsburg |
| 15:30 CEST (UTC+2) | Finnbogason 28'; Stafylidis (yellow card) 59'; Kohr (yellow card) 90+1' | Report | Ginter (yellow card) 13'; Aubameyang 32' | Stadium: WWK ARENA; Attendance: 30,660; Referee: Sascha Stegemann |

| 20 May 2017 34 | 1899 Hoffenheim | 0–0 | FC Augsburg | Sinsheim |
| 15:30 CEST (UTC+2) | Rudy (yellow card) 45'; Zuber (yellow card) 55' | Report | Baier (yellow card) 45' | Stadium: WIRSOL Rhein-Neckar-Arena; Attendance: 30,150; Referee: Marco Fritz |

=== DFB-Pokal ===
| 19 August 2016 First round | FV Ravensburg | 0–2 | FC Augsburg | Pfullendorf |
| 20:45 CEST (UTC+2) | Fiesel (yellow card) 72'; Mähr (yellow card) 76'; Soyudoğru (yellow card) 78' (yellow-red card) 88' | Report | Koo 29', (yellow card) 33'; Bobadilla 68'; Baier (yellow card) 82'; Hitz (yellow card) 88' | Stadium: Geberit-Arena; Attendance: 8,000; Referee: Benedikt Kempkes |

| 26 October 2016 Second round | Bayern Munich | 3–1 | FC Augsburg | Munich |
| 20:45 CEST (UTC+2) | Lahm 2'; Green 41'; Coman (yellow card) 82'; Alaba 90+3' | Report | Baier (yellow card) 27'; Kohr (yellow card) 52'; Ji 68' | Stadium: Allianz Arena; Attendance: 73,500; Referee: Sascha Stegemann |

== Statistics ==
=== Appearances and goals ===
| No. | Pos | Nat | Player | Total | | Bundesliga | | DFB-Pokal | |
| No. | Pos | Nat | Player | Apps | Goals | Apps | Goals | Apps | Goals |
Goalkeepers
| 1 | GK | (Germany) GER | Andreas Luthe | 2 | 0 | 2 | 0 | 0 | 0 |
| 24 | GK | (Greece) GRE | Ioannis Gelios | 0 | 0 | 0 | 0 | 0 | 0 |
| 35 | GK | (Switzerland) SUI | Marwin Hitz | 34 | 0 | 32 | 0 | 2 | 0 |
Defenders
| 2 | DF | (Netherlands) NED | Paul Verhaegh | 31 | 3 | 31 | 3 | 0 | 0 |
| 3 | DF | (Greece) GRE | Kostas Stafylidis | 29 | 4 | 26+1 | 4 | 2 | 0 |
| 6 | DF | (Netherlands) NED | Jeffrey Gouweleeuw | 19 | 2 | 18 | 2 | 1 | 0 |
| 15 | DF | (Germany) GER | Marvin Friedrich | 0 | 0 | 0 | 0 | 0 | 0 |
| 16 | DF | (Germany) GER | Christoph Janker | 17 | 0 | 12+3 | 0 | 2 | 0 |
| 18 | DF | (Germany) GER | Jan-Ingwer Callsen-Bracker | 1 | 0 | 0+1 | 0 | 0 | 0 |
| 31 | DF | (Germany) GER | Philipp Max | 26 | 1 | 20+5 | 1 | 1 | 0 |
| 32 | DF | (Germany) GER | Raphael Framberger | 3 | 0 | 2+1 | 0 | 0 | 0 |
| 36 | DF | (Austria) AUT | Martin Hinteregger | 32 | 3 | 31 | 3 | 1 | 0 |
| 40 | DF | (Germany) GER | Tim Rieder | 5 | 0 | 2+3 | 0 | 0 | 0 |
Midfielders
| 5 | MF | (Germany) GER | Moritz Leitner | 6 | 0 | 2+4 | 0 | 0 | 0 |
| 7 | MF | (Turkey) TUR | Halil Altıntop | 33 | 6 | 17+14 | 6 | 0+2 | 0 |
| 8 | MF | (Germany) GER | Markus Feulner | 2 | 0 | 0+1 | 0 | 0+1 | 0 |
| 10 | MF | (Germany) GER | Daniel Baier | 29 | 1 | 27 | 1 | 2 | 0 |
| 11 | MF | (France) FRA | Jonathan Schmid | 26 | 1 | 20+5 | 1 | 0+1 | 0 |
| 14 | MF | (Czech Republic) CZE | Jan Morávek | 13 | 0 | 10+3 | 0 | 0 | 0 |
| 19 | MF | (South Korea) KOR | Koo Ja-cheol | 25 | 3 | 22+1 | 2 | 2 | 1 |
| 20 | MF | (Serbia) SRB | Gojko Kačar | 24 | 0 | 12+11 | 0 | 1 | 0 |
| 21 | MF | (Germany) GER | Dominik Kohr | 28 | 2 | 21+5 | 2 | 2 | 0 |
| 28 | MF | (Austria) AUT | Georg Teigl | 19 | 0 | 4+14 | 0 | 1 | 0 |
| 30 | MF | (Brazil) BRA | Caiuby | 6 | 0 | 2+3 | 0 | 1 | 0 |
| 38 | MF | (Austria) AUT | Kevin Danso | 7 | 0 | 7 | 0 | 0 | 0 |
| 39 | MF | (Japan) JPN | Takashi Usami | 11 | 0 | 5+6 | 0 | 0 | 0 |
Forwards
| 22 | FW | (South Korea) KOR | Ji Dong-won | 36 | 4 | 24+10 | 3 | 1+1 | 1 |
| 25 | FW | (Paraguay) PAR | Raúl Bobadilla | 19 | 5 | 13+5 | 4 | 1 | 1 |
| 27 | FW | (Iceland) ISL | Alfreð Finnbogason | 14 | 3 | 13 | 3 | 1 | 0 |
| 33 | FW | (Germany) GER | Julian Günther-Schmidt | 5 | 0 | 0+4 | 0 | 0+1 | 0 |
Players transferred out during the season
| 4 | DF | (Ghana) GHA | Daniel Opare | 1 | 0 | 0 | 0 | 1 | 0 |

Last updated: 20 May 2017
Source: Competitions

=== Goalscorers ===
| Rank | No. | Pos | Nat | Name | Bundesliga | DFB-Pokal | Total |
|---|---|---|---|---|---|---|---|
| 1 | 7 | MF | (Turkey) | Halil Altıntop | 6 | 0 | 6 |
| 2 | 25 | FW | (Paraguay) | Raúl Bobadilla | 4 | 1 | 5 |
| 3 | 3 | DF | (Greece) | Kostas Stafylidis | 4 | 0 | 4 |
| 3 | 22 | FW | (South Korea) | Ji Dong-won | 3 | 1 | 4 |
| 5 | 2 | DF | (Netherlands) | Paul Verhaegh | 3 | 0 | 3 |
| 5 | 19 | MF | (South Korea) | Koo Ja-cheol | 2 | 1 | 3 |
| 5 | 27 | FW | (Iceland) | Alfreð Finnbogason | 3 | 0 | 3 |
| 5 | 36 | DF | (Austria) | Martin Hinteregger | 3 | 0 | 3 |
| 9 | 6 | DF | (Netherlands) | Jeffrey Gouweleeuw | 2 | 0 | 2 |
| 9 | 21 | MF | (Germany) | Dominik Kohr | 2 | 0 | 2 |
| 11 | 10 | MF | (Germany) | Daniel Baier | 1 | 0 | 1 |
| 11 | 11 | MF | (France) | Jonathan Schmid | 1 | 0 | 1 |
| 11 | 31 | DF | (Germany) | Philipp Max | 1 | 0 | 1 |
| Own goal | | | | | 0 | 0 | 0 |
| Totals | | | | | 35 | 3 | 38 |

Last updated: 13 May 2017

=== Clean sheets ===
| Rank | No. | Pos | Nat | Name | Bundesliga | DFB-Pokal | Total |
|---|---|---|---|---|---|---|---|
| 1 | 35 | GK | (Switzerland) | Marwin Hitz | 7 | 1 | 8 |
| 2 | 1 | GK | (Germany) | Andreas Luthe | 1 | 0 | 1 |
| Totals | | | | | 8 | 1 | 9 |

Last updated: 20 May 2017

=== Disciplinary record ===
| No. | Pos | Nat | Player | Bundesliga | | | DFB-Pokal | | | Total | | |
| No. | Pos | Nat | Player | Booked | (yellow card) (yellow-red card) | Sent off (straight red) | Booked | (yellow card) (yellow-red card) | Sent off (straight red) | Booked | (yellow card) (yellow-red card) | Sent off (straight red) |
| 2 | DF | (Netherlands) | Paul Verhaegh | 4 | 0 | 0 | 0 | 0 | 0 | 4 | 0 | 0 |
| 3 | DF | (Greece) | Kostas Stafylidis | 6 | 0 | 0 | 0 | 0 | 0 | 6 | 0 | 0 |
| 6 | DF | (Netherlands) | Jeffrey Gouweleeuw | 4 | 0 | 0 | 0 | 0 | 0 | 4 | 0 | 0 |
| 7 | MF | (Turkey) | Halil Altıntop | 1 | 0 | 0 | 0 | 0 | 0 | 1 | 0 | 0 |
| 10 | MF | (Germany) | Daniel Baier | 5 | 0 | 0 | 2 | 0 | 0 | 7 | 0 | 0 |
| 11 | MF | (France) | Jonathan Schmid | 1 | 0 | 0 | 0 | 0 | 0 | 1 | 0 | 0 |
| 14 | MF | (Czech Republic) | Jan Morávek | 2 | 0 | 0 | 0 | 0 | 0 | 2 | 0 | 0 |
| 16 | DF | (Germany) | Christoph Janker | 4 | 0 | 0 | 0 | 0 | 0 | 4 | 0 | 0 |
| 19 | MF | (South Korea) | Koo Ja-cheol | 6 | 1 | 0 | 1 | 0 | 0 | 7 | 1 | 0 |
| 20 | MF | (Serbia) | Gojko Kačar | 1 | 0 | 0 | 0 | 0 | 0 | 1 | 0 | 0 |
| 21 | MF | (Germany) | Dominik Kohr | 12 | 1 | 0 | 1 | 0 | 0 | 13 | 1 | 0 |
| 22 | FW | (South Korea) | Ji Dong-won | 4 | 0 | 0 | 0 | 0 | 0 | 4 | 0 | 0 |
| 25 | FW | (Paraguay) | Raúl Bobadilla | 1 | 0 | 0 | 0 | 0 | 0 | 1 | 0 | 0 |
| 27 | FW | (Iceland) | Alfreð Finnbogason | 1 | 0 | 1 | 0 | 0 | 0 | 1 | 0 | 1 |
| 28 | MF | (Austria) | Georg Teigl | 1 | 0 | 0 | 0 | 0 | 0 | 1 | 0 | 0 |
| 30 | MF | (Brazil) | Caiuby | 1 | 0 | 0 | 0 | 0 | 0 | 1 | 0 | 0 |
| 31 | DF | (Germany) | Philipp Max | 4 | 0 | 0 | 0 | 0 | 0 | 4 | 0 | 0 |
| 35 | GK | (Switzerland) | Marwin Hitz | 4 | 0 | 0 | 1 | 0 | 0 | 5 | 0 | 0 |
| 36 | DF | (Austria) | Martin Hinteregger | 5 | 0 | 0 | 0 | 0 | 0 | 5 | 0 | 0 |
| Totals | | | | 67 | 2 | 1 | 5 | 0 | 0 | 72 | 2 | 1 |

Last updated: 20 May 2017
