= 2007–08 TSG 1899 Hoffenheim season =

TSG 1899 Hoffenheim
2007–08 season
- Manager: Ralf Rangnick
- Stadium: Dietmar-Hopp-Stadion
- 2. Bundesliga: 2nd (promoted)
- DFB-Pokal: Quarter-finals
- Top goalscorer: Chinedu Obasi (12)

During the 2007–08 German football season, TSG 1899 Hoffenheim competed in the 2. Bundesliga.

== Season summary ==
Hoffenheim's first ever season in the 2. Bundesliga saw them promoted to the Bundesliga for the first time, as runners-up.

== First-team squad ==
Squad at end of season

Note: Flags indicate national team as defined under FIFA eligibility rules; some limited exceptions apply. Players may hold more than one non-FIFA nationality.

| No. | Pos. | Nation | Player |
|---|---|---|---|
| 1 | GK | GER | Daniel Haas |
| 3 | DF | GER | Matthias Jaissle |
| 4 | MF | GER | Steffen Haas |
| 5 | DF | GER | Marvin Compper |
| 6 | DF | GER | Michael Rundio |
| 7 | DF | GER | Dragan Paljić |
| 9 | FW | CRO | Tomislav Marić (Note: Marić was born in Heilbronn, West Germany (now Germany), but also qualified to represent Croatia internationally through his parents and made his international debut for Croatia in May 2002.) |
| 10 | MF | GER | Selim Teber |
| 11 | MF | GER | Jochen Seitz |
| 12 | DF | GER | Denis Bindnagel |
| 13 | DF | HUN | Zsolt Lőw |
| 14 | DF | GER | Christoph Janker |
| 15 | DF | CZE | Radek Špiláček |
| 16 | MF | GER | Matthias Keller |

| No. | Pos. | Nation | Player |
|---|---|---|---|
| 17 | MF | GER | Tobias Weis |
| 18 | FW | GER | Kai Hesse |
| 19 | FW | BIH | Vedad Ibišević |
| 20 | FW | NGA | Chinedu Obasi |
| 21 | MF | BRA | Luiz Gustavo (on loan from Corinthians Alagoano) |
| 22 | FW | GER | Francisco Copado |
| 23 | MF | BIH | Sejad Salihović |
| 24 | DF | SWE | Per Nilsson |
| 25 | DF | GHA | Isaac Vorsah (on loan from Asante Kotoko) |
| 26 | DF | AUT | Andreas Ibertsberger |
| 27 | GK | AUT | Ramazan Özcan |
| 29 | FW | SEN | Demba Ba (Note: Ba was born in Sèvres, France, but also qualified to represent Senegal internationally through his parents and made his international debut for Senegal in June 2007.) |
| 30 | GK | GER | Thorsten Kirschbaum |
| 33 | MF | BRA | Carlos Eduardo |

=== Left club during season ===
Note: Flags indicate national team as defined under FIFA eligibility rules; some limited exceptions apply. Players may hold more than one non-FIFA nationality.

| No. | Pos. | Nation | Player |
|---|---|---|---|
| 5 | DF | GER | Marcel Throm (to Sportfreunde Siegen) |
| 8 | MF | GER | Andreas Mayer (to VfR Aalen) |

| No. | Pos. | Nation | Player |
|---|---|---|---|
| 20 | FW | BIH | Mirnes Mešić (to Kickers Offenbach) |

== Competitions ==
=== Overview ===
| Competition | First match | Last match | Starting round | Final position | Record | | | | | | | |
| Competition | First match | Last match | Starting round | Final position | Pld | W | D | L | GF | GA | GD | Win % |
|---|---|---|---|---|---|---|---|---|---|---|---|---|
| Bundesliga | 12 August 2007 | 18 May 2008 | Matchday 1 | 2nd | 34 | 17 | 9 | 8 | 60 | 40 | +20 | 50.00 |
| DFB-Pokal | 3 August 2007 | 26 February 2008 | First round | Quarter-finals | 4 | 3 | 0 | 1 | 9 | 7 | +2 | 75.00 |
| Total | | | | | 38 | 20 | 9 | 9 | 69 | 47 | +22 | 52.63 |

Last updated: 1 March 2022
Source: DFB

=== 2. Bundesliga ===
==== League table ====
| Pos | Team | Pld | W | D | L | GF | GA | GD | Pts | Promotion or relegation |
|---|---|---|---|---|---|---|---|---|---|---|
| 1 | Borussia Mönchengladbach (C, P) | 34 | 18 | 12 | 4 | 71 | 38 | +33 | 66 | Promotion to Bundesliga |
| 2 | 1899 Hoffenheim (P) | 34 | 17 | 9 | 8 | 60 | 40 | +20 | 60 | Promotion to Bundesliga |
| 3 | 1. FC Köln (P) | 34 | 17 | 9 | 8 | 62 | 44 | +18 | 60 | Promotion to Bundesliga |
| 4 | Mainz 05 | 34 | 16 | 10 | 8 | 62 | 36 | +26 | 58 | |
| 5 | SC Freiburg | 34 | 15 | 10 | 9 | 49 | 44 | +5 | 55 | |

Source: Bundesliga.de
Rules for classification: 1) points; 2) goal difference; 3) number of goals scored.
(C) Champions; (P) Promoted

==== Results summary ====
| Overall | | | | | | | | Home | | | | | | Away | | | | | |
| Pld | W | D | L | GF | GA | GD | Pts | W | D | L | GF | GA | GD | W | D | L | GF | GA | GD |
|---|---|---|---|---|---|---|---|---|---|---|---|---|---|---|---|---|---|---|---|
| 34 | 17 | 9 | 8 | 60 | 40 | +20 | 60 | 11 | 2 | 4 | 34 | 17 | +17 | 6 | 7 | 4 | 26 | 23 | +3 |

Last updated: 1 March 2022.
Source: DFB

==== Results by round ====
| Round | 1 | 2 | 3 | 4 | 5 | 6 | 7 | 8 | 9 | 10 | 11 | 12 | 13 | 14 | 15 | 16 | 17 | 18 | 19 | 20 | 21 | 22 | 23 | 24 | 25 | 26 | 27 | 28 | 29 | 30 | 31 | 32 | 33 | 34 |
|---|---|---|---|---|---|---|---|---|---|---|---|---|---|---|---|---|---|---|---|---|---|---|---|---|---|---|---|---|---|---|---|---|---|---|
| Ground | H | A | H | A | H | A | A | H | A | H | A | H | A | H | A | H | A | A | H | A | H | A | H | H | A | H | A | H | A | H | A | H | A | H |
| Result | L | D | L | L | W | W | D | W | D | W | D | D | W | L | D | D | L | W | W | W | W | W | W | W | D | W | W | L | L | W | L | W | D | W |
| Position | 13 | 14 | 17 | 17 | 15 | 13 | 13 | 11 | 10 | 9 | 9 | 8 | 8 | 8 | 8 | 8 | 8 | 7 | 7 | 7 | 6 | 4 | 4 | 2 | 2 | 2 | 2 | 2 | 3 | 2 | 4 | 3 | 3 | 2 |

Updated to match(es) played on 18 May 2008. Source: DFB
A = Away; H = Home; W = Win; D = Draw; L = Loss
