= Christoph Janker =

German footballer

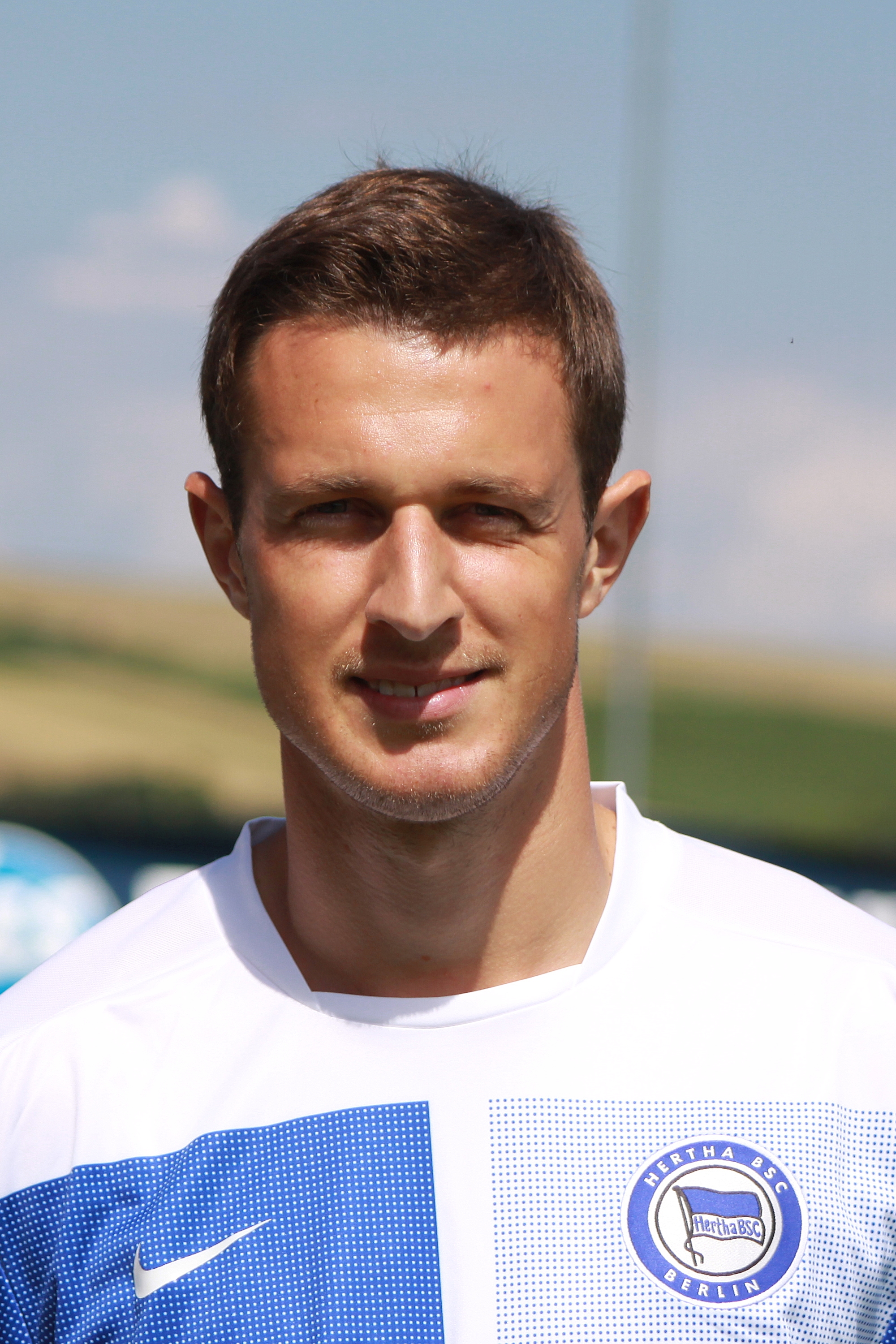

Personal information
- Full name: Christoph Janker
- Date of birth: 14 February 1985 (age 41)
- Place of birth: Cham, West Germany
- Height: 1.85 m (6 ft 1 in)
- Position: Centre back

Team information
- Current team: FC Augsburg (talent-manager)

Youth career
- 1990–1997: DJK Vilzing
- 1997–2001: ASV Cham
- 2001–2003: 1860 Munich

Senior career*
Years	Team	Apps	(Gls)
2004–2006	1860 Munich II	64	(0)
2005–2006	1860 Munich	4	(0)
2006–2009	1899 Hoffenheim	68	(2)
2009–2015	Hertha BSC	47	(0)
2009–2014	Hertha BSC II	21	(2)
2015–2019	FC Augsburg	38	(0)
Total		242	(4)

International career
2004–2005	Germany U20	13	(0)
- * Club domestic league appearances and goals

Christoph Janker (born 14 February 1985) is a German former professional footballer who played as a centre-back.

== Career ==
=== TSV 1860 Munich ===
Janker started out in 1860 Munich's youth system. He played for the reserve team in the 2004–05 season, making 33 appearances, and in the 2005–06 season, making 28 appearances. He eventually made his debut in the 2. Bundesliga in a 2–0 win against Karlsruher SC. He would make three more appearances for the first team during the 2005–06 season. During the following season, he made three appearances for the reserve team before joining 1899 Hoffenheim.

=== 1899 Hoffenheim ===
In his debut season with the club, he scored two goals in 31 league appearances. His first appearance was a 1–1 draw on 19 August 2006 against SV Elversberg. His playing time was reduced the following season. He appeared in 20 matches and two German Cup matches.

In 2009, Janker and his team member Andreas Ibertsberger came under investigation after failing to report to a doping control promptly after the match against Borussia Mönchengladbach on 2 February 2009. The German Football Association (DFB) suspended the investigation due to the lack of evidence, also Janker was later tested negative. The investigation was widely covered by the German press. On 23 May 2009 after the Bundesliga final, he announced his departure at the end of the season on 30 June 2009. In his final season with the club, he made 17 league appearances.

=== Hertha BSC ===
On 28 May 2009, Janker signed a three-year contract with Hertha BSC. In Berlin, Janker struggled to establish himself, sitting on the bench more often than not in his first season for Hertha. He made 15 league appearances, one German Cup appearance, and eight Europa League appearances. He also made two appearances for the reserve team. At the end of the 2009–10 season, Hertha were relegated to the 2. Bundesliga. In the second division, Janker fared even worse. He made only one start, and came on off the bench a further three times in the league. He failed to appear in any match between matchday three, when he came on as a substitute in the 83rd minute in a 3–1 win against Arminia Bielefeld, and matchday 25, when he came on in the 71st minute for Christian Lell in a 3–1 win against FSV Frankfurt. He also made seven appearances for the reserve team. Back in the Bundesliga for 2011–12 season, Janker made 18 league appearances, three German Cup appearances, and two relegation playoff appearances. He made 21 appearances in all competitions for both first and second teams during the 2012–13, 2013–14, and 2014–15 seasons. He left the club for FC Augsburg in January 2015.

=== FC Augsburg ===
During his debut season, he made two league appearances for Augsburg. He debuted for the club in a 1–0 win against Borussia Dortmund on matchday 19, on 4 February 2015. He was sent–off in the match. His only other match was when he came on late in the match on matchday 24 in a 1–0 win against VfL Wolfsburg. He made 18 appearances during the 2015–16 season. He made 17 appearances during the 2016–17 season. He made five appearances during the 2017–18 season.

On 11 May 2019, Augsburg confirmed that Janker would leave the club at the end of the season.

=== Later career ===
On 23 January 2020, Augsburg confirmed that Janker would continue at the club, though as a talent-manager from 1 February 2020. In this role, he would take on the individual support of the top talents and thus act as an important link between the junior department and the professional team. In addition, Janker will take care of the loan players to ensure that the temporarily professional players was even more closely linked.

== International career ==
Janker is a youth international for Germany at the U20 level.

== Career statistics ==
As of matches played on 16 August 2018.

Club	Season	League			Cup^{1}		Continental^{2}		Other^{3}		Total		Ref.
Club	Season	League	Apps	Goals	Apps	Goals	Apps	Goals	Apps	Goals	Apps	Goals	Ref.
1860 Munich II	2004–05	Regionalliga Süd	33	0	—						33	0	
1860 Munich II	2005–06	Regionalliga Süd	28	0	—						28	0	
1860 Munich II	2006–07	Regionalliga Süd	3	0	—						3	0	
1860 Munich II	Club totals		64	0	—						64	0	—
1860 Munich	2005–06	2. Bundesliga	4	0	0	0	—				4	0	
1899 Hoffenheim	2006–07	Regionalliga Süd	31	2	—		—				31	2	
1899 Hoffenheim	2007–08	2. Bundesliga	20	0	2	0	—				22	0	
1899 Hoffenheim	2008–09	Bundesliga	17	0	0	0	—				17	0	
1899 Hoffenheim	Club totals		68	2	2	0	—				70	2	—
Hertha BSC	2009–10	Bundesliga	15	0	1	0	8	0	—		24	0	
Hertha BSC	2010–11	2. Bundesliga	4	0	0	0	—		—		4	0	
Hertha BSC	2011–12	Bundesliga	18	0	3	0	—		2	0	23	0	
Hertha BSC	2012–13	2. Bundesliga	5	0	0	0	—		—		5	0	
Hertha BSC	2013–14	Bundesliga	5	0	1	0	—		—		6	0	
Hertha BSC	Club totals		47	0	5	0	8	0	2	0	62	0	—
Hertha BSC II	2009–10	Regionalliga Nord	2	0	—						2	0	
Hertha BSC II	2009–10	Regionalliga Nord	7	0	—						7	0	
Hertha BSC II	2011–12	Regionalliga Nord	1	0	—						1	0	
Hertha BSC II	2012–13	Regionalliga Nordost	1	0	—						1	0	
Hertha BSC II	2013–14	Regionalliga Nordost	5	1	—						5	1	
Hertha BSC II	2014–15	Regionalliga Nordost	5	1	—						5	1	
Hertha BSC II	Club totals		21	2	—						21	2	—
Augsburg	2014–15	Bundesliga	2	0	0	0	—		—		2	0	
Augsburg	2015–16	Bundesliga	12	0	1	0	5	0	—		18	0	
Augsburg	2016–17	Bundesliga	15	0	2	0	—		—		17	0	
Augsburg	2017–18	Bundesliga	5	0	0	0	—		—		5	0	
Augsburg	2018–19	Bundesliga	0	0	0	0	—		—		0	0	
Augsburg	Club totals		34	0	3	0	5	0	—		42	0	—
Career totals			234	2	10	0	13	0	2	0	259	2	—

- 1.Includes German Cup.
- 2.Includes Europa League.
- 3.Includes Relegation playoff.
