= Sascha Bigalke =

German footballer

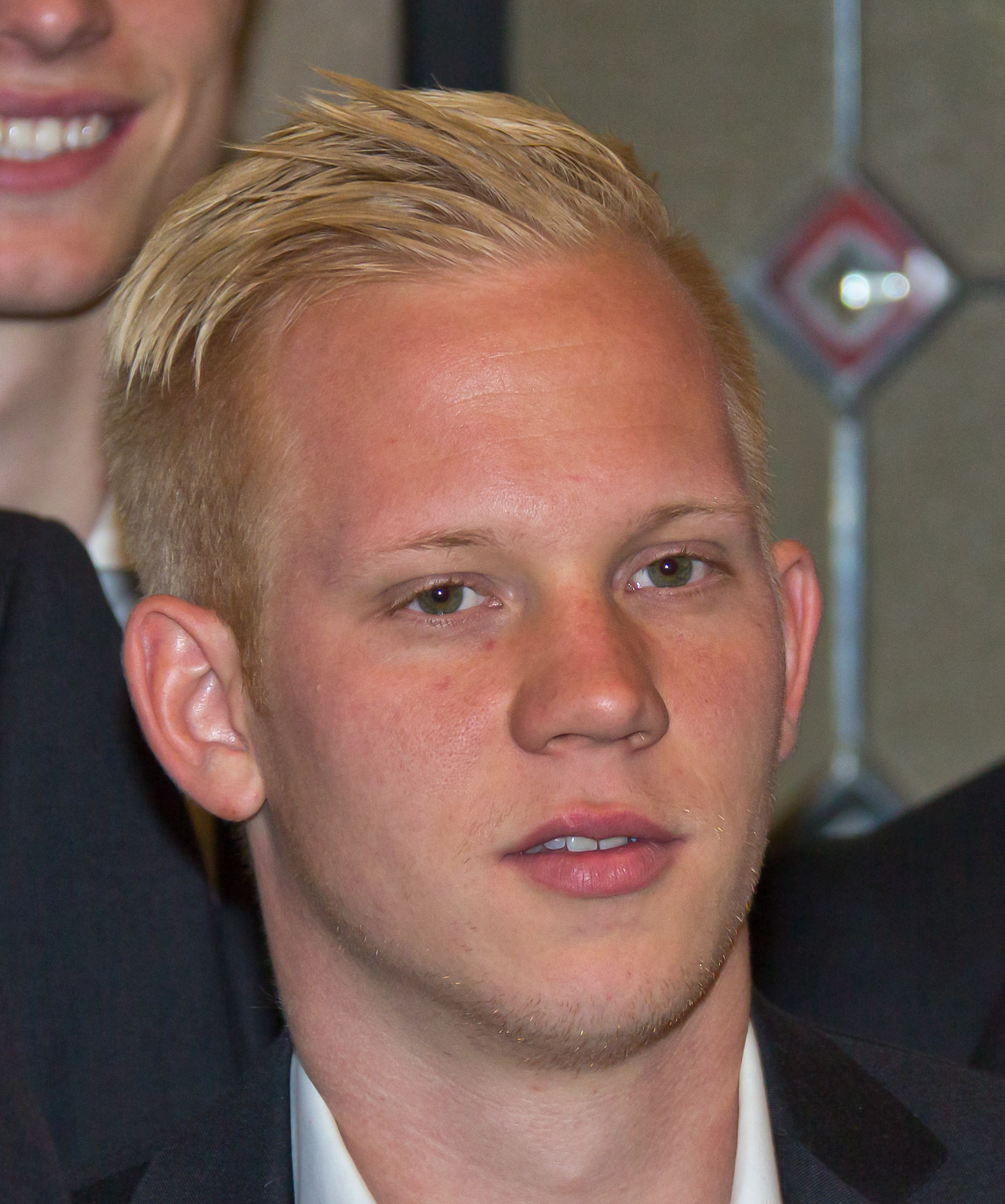
- Bigalke at 1. FC Köln in 2014

Personal information
- Full name: Sascha Bigalke
- Date of birth: 8 January 1990 (age 36)
- Place of birth: West Berlin, Germany
- Height: 1.67 m (5 ft 6 in)
- Position: Attacking midfielder

Youth career
- –1999: Reinickendorfer Füchse
- 1999–2007: Hertha BSC

Senior career*
Years	Team	Apps	(Gls)
2007–2011	Hertha BSC II	51	(7)
2008–2011	Hertha BSC	1	(0)
2011–2012	SpVgg Unterhaching	42	(8)
2012–2014	1. FC Köln	17	(2)
2012–2014	1. FC Köln II	3	(0)
2014–2021	SpVgg Unterhaching	150	(34)
Total		264	(51)

International career
2005–2006	Germany U16	9	(2)
2006–2007	Germany U17	26	(11)
2007–2008	Germany U18	3	(1)
2008–2009	Germany U19	6	(5)
2009–2010	Germany U20	3	(1)
- * Club domestic league appearances and goals

Sascha Bigalke (born 8 January 1990) is a German former professional footballer who played as an attacking midfielder.

== Career ==
Bigalke started his professional career with Hertha BSC, making his first appearance on 31 July 2008 in the 2008–09 UEFA Cup first qualifying round second leg against FC Nistru Otaci. In January 2011, he was set to transfer to Arminia Bielefeld, but the deal fell through when Bigalke broke his foot shortly before the completion of the transfer. Having made only a single league appearance for Hertha, he moved on a free transfer to SpVgg Unterhaching in July 2011.

At Unterhaching Bigalke became a key player, scoring nine goals and providing twelve assists in 45 matches (league and cup). After playing in a 1-2 first round DFB-Pokal loss against 1. FC Köln he drew the opponent's attention and signed for them in August 2012, on transfer deadline day. The transfer fee allegedly amounted to €400,000 and helped chronically cash-strapped Unterhaching obtain a playing license.

In his first season for 1. FC Köln, Bigalke played a decent role with 16 appearances with eight of them in the starting eleven. During the 2013–14 pre-season he tore his cruciate ligament running into the opponent's goalkeeper in a friendly against local side SF Troisdorf. Subsequently, he missed almost the whole season, only being substituted once at second to last matchday in a home fixture against FC St. Pauli in which Bigalke scored.

On 22 July 2014, 1. FC Köln announced that Bigalke, along with four more players, would not be a part of the first team any more. Instead he was urged to leave the club and had to participate in training with the second team. Consequently, his contract was dissolved by mutual agreement and was able to return to Unterhaching on a free transfer. He signed for them on a one-year deal including an extension clause for another year.

Bigalke retired from football in March 2021 due to injuries.

== Career statistics ==
As of match played 25 June 2020

Appearances and goals by club, season and competition
Club	Season	League			Cup		Other		Total		Ref.
Club	Season	Division	Apps	Goals	Apps	Goals	Apps	Goals	Apps	Goals	Ref.
Hertha BSC II	2007–08	NOFV-Oberliga Nord	7	3	—		—		7	3	
Hertha BSC II	2008–09	Regionalliga Nord	18	2	—		—		18	2	
Hertha BSC II	2009–10	Regionalliga Nord	23	2	—		—		23	2	
Hertha BSC II	2010–11	Regionalliga Nord	3	0	—		—		3	0	
Hertha BSC II	Total		51	7	—		—		51	7	—
Hertha BSC	2008–09	Bundesliga	0	0	0	0	1 (Note: Appearances in the UEFA Cup.)	0	1	0	
Hertha BSC	2009–10	Bundesliga	1	0	0	0	2	0	3	0	
Hertha BSC	Total		1	0	0	0	3	0	4	0	—
SpVgg Unterhaching	2011–12	3. Liga	35	6	2	1	—		37	7	
SpVgg Unterhaching	2012–13	3. Liga	7	2	1	0	—		8	2	
SpVgg Unterhaching	Total		42	8	3	1	—		45	9	—
Köln	2012–13	2. Bundesliga	16	1	2	0	—		18	1	
Köln	2013–14	2.Bundesliga	1	1	0	0	—		1	1	
Köln	Total		17	2	2	0	—		19	2	—
Köln II	2012–13	Regionalliga West	1	0	—		—		1	0	
Köln II	2013–14	Regionalliga West	2	0	—		—		2	0	
Köln II	Total		3	0	—		—		3	0	—
SpVgg Unterhaching	2014–15	3. Liga	8	0	0	0	—		8	0	
SpVgg Unterhaching	Total		8	0	0	0	—		8	0	—
SpVgg Unterhaching	2015–16	Regionalliga Bayern	12	6	0	0	—		12	6	
SpVgg Unterhaching	2016–17	Regionalliga Bayern	34	19	1	0	2 (Note: Appearances in promotion playoff.)	1	37	20	
SpVgg Unterhaching	2017–18	3. Liga	36	4	1	0	—		37	4	
SpVgg Unterhaching	2018–19	3. Liga	33	2	0	0	—		33	2	
SpVgg Unterhaching	2019–20	3. Liga	25	2	0	0	1 (Note: Appearance in the Bavarian Cup.)	0	26	2	
SpVgg Unterhaching	Total		140	33	2	0	3	1	145	34	—
Career total			262	50	7	1	6	1	275	52	—
