= Markus Obernosterer =

Austrian footballer (born 1990)

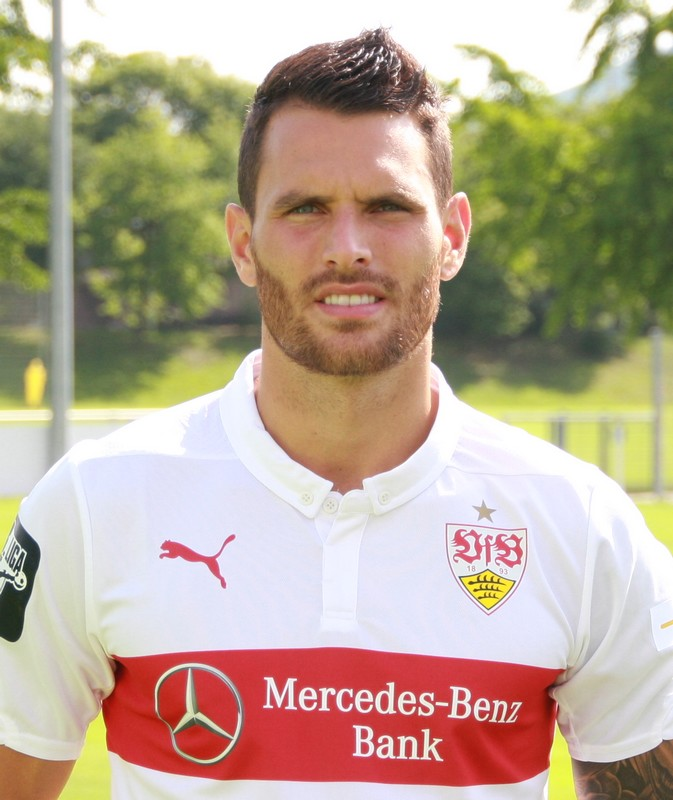
- Obernosterer in 2014

Personal information
- Date of birth: 14 April 1990 (age 36)
- Place of birth: Innsbruck, Austria
- Height: 1.80 m (5 ft 11 in)
- Position: Midfielder

Team information
- Current team: Calcio Leinfelden-Echterdingen
- Number: 14

Youth career
- 1996–2001: SV Völs
- 2001–2005: Innsbrucker AC
- 2005–2008: BNZ Tirol

Senior career*
Years	Team	Apps	(Gls)
2008–2011	Wacker Innsbruck	31	(0)
2008–2010	→ Wacker Innsbruck (A)		
2010–2011	→ Energie Cottbus II (loan)	27	(6)
2011–2014	WSG Wattens		
2014–2015	VfB Stuttgart II	15	(2)
2015–2017	SV Elversberg	49	(11)
2017–2019	1. FC Saarbrücken	27	(3)
2019–2023	Stuttgarter Kickers	46	(23)
2023–	Calcio Leinfelden-Echterdingen	1	(0)

International career^{‡}
2009	Austria U-20	1	(0)
- * Club domestic league appearances and goals as of 1 June 2024 ‡ National team caps and goals as of 14:41, 26 May 2020 (UTC)

Markus Obernosterer (born 14 April 1990) is an Austrian footballer who plays as a midfielder for German Oberliga Baden-Württemberg club Calcio Leinfelden-Echterdingen. He has played in the 3. Liga with VfB Stuttgart II and in the Austrian 2. Liga with Wacker Innsbruck.

== Club career ==
In the summer of 2019, Obernosterer signed for Stuttgarter Kickers on a two-year contract.

== International career ==
Obernosterer has played for Austria at under-20 level, appearing in a 2–2 draw against Germany under-20 on 13 November 2009.
