= Gojko Kačar =

Serbian footballer (born 1987)

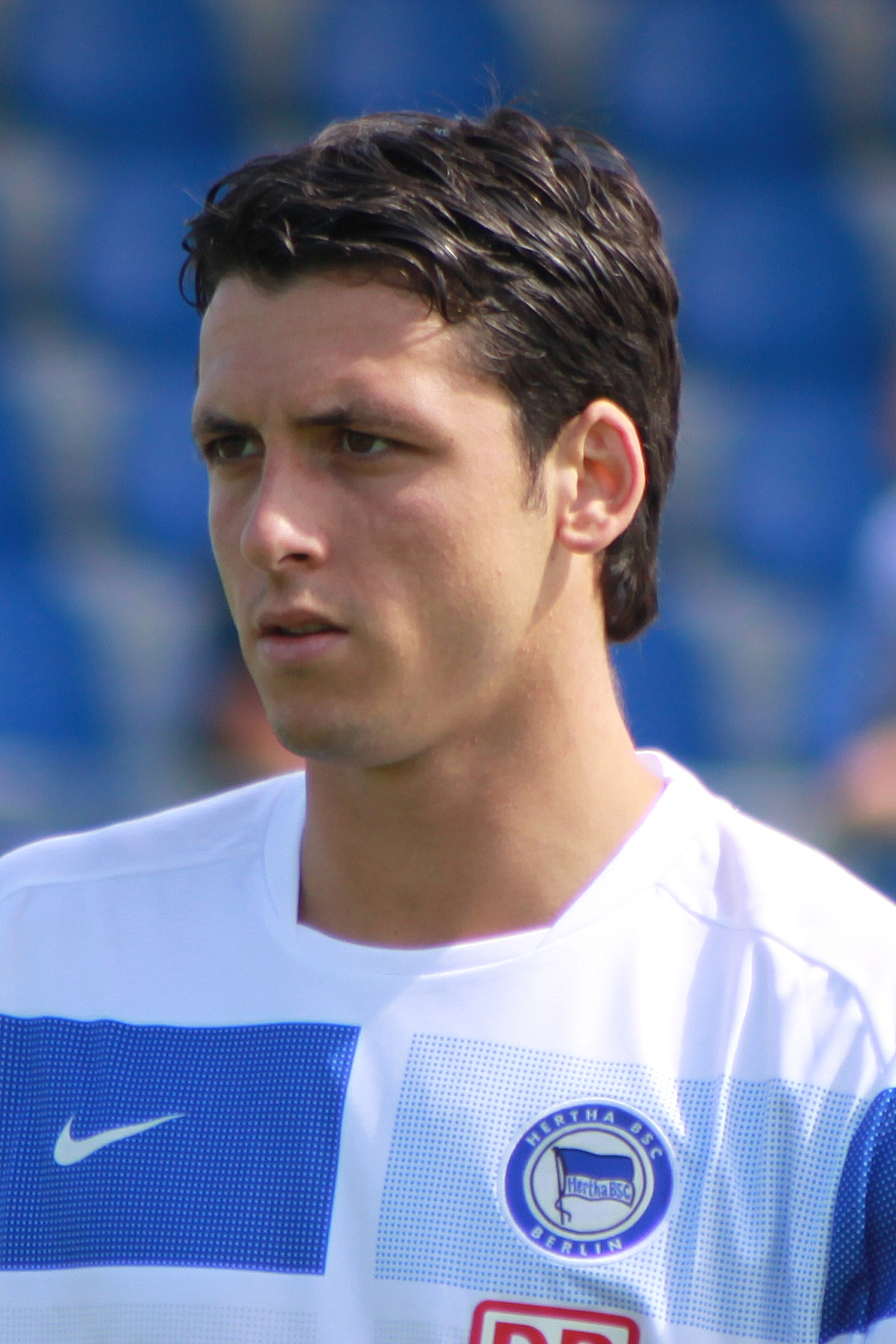
- Kačar with Hertha in 2009

Personal information
- Date of birth: 26 January 1987 (age 39)
- Place of birth: Novi Sad, SR Serbia, Yugoslavia
- Height: 1.85 m (6 ft 1 in)
- Position: Midfielder

Youth career
- Vojvodina

Senior career*
| Years | Team | Apps | (Gls) |
| 2003–2008 | Vojvodina | 78 | (16) |
| 2008–2010 | Hertha BSC | 64 | (10) |
| 2010–2016 | Hamburger SV | 78 | (7) |
| 2014 | → Cerezo Osaka (loan) | 12 | (1) |
| 2016–2018 | Augsburg | 28 | (1) |
| 2018–2019 | Anorthosis | 6 | (0) |
| Total | | 266 | (35) |

International career
| 2006–2009 | Serbia U21 | 16 | (7) |
| 2007–2012 | Serbia | 25 | (0) |
Medal record
| Silver medal – second place | UEFA Under-21 Championship | 2007 |
- * Club domestic league appearances and goals

Gojko Kačar (Serbian Cyrillic: Гојко Качар, pronounced [ɡôːjko kâtʃaːr]; born 26 January 1987) is a Serbian former professional footballer who played as a midfielder.

== Club career ==
Kačar played for Vojvodina's youth academy before being promoted to the first team. In January 2008, he moved to Germany to play for Hertha BSC for a fee of €3 million, which made him the most expensive player that Vojvodina ever sold.

On 21 August 2010, Kačar debuted for Hamburger SV, coming on as a substitute for Eljero Elia in the 79th minute of a 2–1 home win against Schalke.

After an unsuccessful stint in Japan playing for Cerezo Osaka, on 19 July 2016, Kačar left Hamburg to join FC Augsburg.

In August 2018, Kačar joined Cypriot club Anorthosis Famagusta. He retired in 2019.

== International career ==
Kačar was called up to the Serbian under-21 team for the 2007 UEFA European Under-21 Championship in the Netherlands. He made his debut in a 0–2 loss to England, which was also his only match at the tournament.

On 7 September 2008, Kačar scored five goals for the Serbian U21 team in an 8–0 demolition of Hungary in a qualifying match for the 2009 UEFA European Under-21 Championship. At the main tournament, he also scored once, but it was the only goal that Serbia ever scored.

Kačar represented Serbia at the 2008 Summer Olympics, making his debut against Australia on 7 August 2008.

In June 2010, he was selected in Serbia's squad for the 2010 FIFA World Cup, where he appeared in group stage match against Germany.

He went on to make 25 appearances at senior level. His final international was a February 2012 friendly match away against Cyprus.

== Personal life ==
Kačar's two uncles, Slobodan and Tadija, are Olympic medalists in boxing. Slobodan won a gold medal at the 1980 Summer Olympics, while Tadija won silver in 1976.

== Career statistics ==
=== Club ===
Appearances and goals by club, season and competition
| Club | Season | League | | | Cup | | Continental | | Total | |
| Club | Season | Division | Apps | Goals | Apps | Goals | Apps | Goals | Apps | Goals |
|---|---|---|---|---|---|---|---|---|---|---|
| Vojvodina | 2003–04 | First League of Serbia and Montenegro | 1 | 0 | ? | ? | — | | 1 | 0 |
| Vojvodina | 2004–05 | First League of Serbia and Montenegro | 12 | 2 | ? | ? | — | | 12 | 2 |
| Vojvodina | 2005–06 | First League of Serbia and Montenegro | 26 | 2 | ? | ? | — | | 26 | 2 |
| Vojvodina | 2006–07 | Serbian Superliga | 22 | 1 | ? | ? | — | | 22 | 1 |
| Vojvodina | 2007–08 | Serbian Superliga | 17 | 11 | ? | ? | 4 (Note: Appearance(s) in UEFA Cup) | 1 | 21 | 12 |
| Vojvodina | Total | | 78 | 16 | ? | ? | 4 | 1 | 82 | 17 |
| Hertha BSC | 2007–08 | Bundesliga | 17 | 1 | 0 | 0 | — | | 17 | 1 |
| Hertha BSC | 2008–09 | Bundesliga | 25 | 6 | 0 | 0 | 6 | 1 | 31 | 7 |
| Hertha BSC | 2009–10 | Bundesliga | 22 | 3 | 2 | 0 | 6 (Note: Appearance(s) in UEFA Europa League) | 3 | 30 | 6 |
| Hertha BSC | Total | | 64 | 10 | 2 | 0 | 12 | 4 | 78 | 14 |
| Hamburger SV | 2010–11 | Bundesliga | 23 | 2 | 0 | 0 | — | | 23 | 2 |
| Hamburger SV | 2011–12 | Bundesliga | 21 | 1 | 2 | 0 | — | | 23 | 1 |
| Hamburger SV | 2012–13 | Bundesliga | 3 | 0 | 0 | 0 | — | | 3 | 0 |
| Hamburger SV | 2013–14 | Bundesliga | 0 | 0 | 0 | 0 | — | | 0 | 0 |
| Hamburger SV | 2014–15 | Bundesliga | 12 | 3 | 1 | 0 | — | | 13 | 3 |
| Hamburger SV | 2015–16 | Bundesliga | 19 | 1 | 0 | 0 | — | | 19 | 1 |
| Hamburger SV | Total | | 78 | 7 | 3 | 0 | — | | 81 | 7 |
| Cerezo Osaka (loan) | 2014 | J1 League | 12 | 1 | — | | 4 (Note: Appearance(s) in AFC Champions League) | 0 | 16 | 1 |
| Augsburg | 2016–17 | Bundesliga | 22 | 0 | 1 | 0 | — | | 23 | 0 |
| Augsburg | 2017–18 | Bundesliga | 6 | 1 | 0 | 0 | — | | 6 | 1 |
| Augsburg | Total | | 28 | 1 | 1 | 0 | — | | 29 | 1 |
| Anorthosis | 2018–19 | Cypriot First Division | 6 | 0 | 1 | 0 | 0 | 0 | 7 | 0 |
| Career total | | | 266 | 35 | 7 | 0 | 20 | 4 | 293 | 39 |

=== International ===
Appearances and goals by national team and year
| National team | Year | Apps | Goals |
|---|---|---|---|
Serbia
| Serbia | 2007 | 1 | 0 |
| Serbia | 2008 | 5 | 0 |
| Serbia | 2009 | 8 | 0 |
| Serbia | 2010 | 8 | 0 |
| Serbia | 2011 | 2 | 0 |
| Serbia | 2012 | 1 | 0 |
| Total | | 25 | 0 |
