= 2004–05 1. FC Kaiserslautern season =

1. FC Kaiserslautern
2004–05 season
- Manager: Kurt Jara; Hans-Werner Moser
- Stadium: Fritz-Walter-Stadion
- Bundesliga: 12th
- DFB-Pokal: Second round
- Top goalscorer: League: Halil Altıntop; Ioannis Amanatidis; Ferydoon Zandi (6); All: Carsten Jancker (10)
Home colours

During the 2004–05 German football season, 1. FC Kaiserslautern competed in the Bundesliga.

== Season summary ==
Kaiserslautern rose to 12th in the final table. The highlight of the season was undoubtedly the team's 15–0 victory at fifth-tier FC Schönberg 95, which saw striker Carsten Jancker break the German record for the most goals scored in a DFB-Pokal match. However, manager Kurt Jara quit before the end of the season, citing irreconcilable differences with the club management. After a brief caretaker spell under 1. FC Kaiserslautern Amateure manager Hans-Werner Moser, the club turned to Michael Henke, former assistant coach of Bayern Munich, as his permanent successor.

== Players ==
=== First-team squad ===
Squad at end of season

Note: Flags indicate national team as defined under FIFA eligibility rules; some limited exceptions apply. Players may hold more than one non-FIFA nationality.

No.	Pos.	Nation	Player
1	GK	GER	Tim Wiese
2	DF	COD	Nzelo Hervé Lembi
3	DF	CMR	Bill Tchato
4	DF	GER	Timo Wenzel
5	DF	GER	Ingo Hertzsch
6	MF	GER	Christian Nerlinger
7	DF	EGY	Hany Ramzy
9	FW	GER	Carsten Jancker
10	MF	IRN	Ferydoon Zandi (Note: Zandi was born in Emden, West Germany, and represented Germany at U-21 level, but also qualified to represent Iran internationally and made his international debut for Iran in February 2005.)
11	FW	GRE	Ioannis Amanatidis
13	MF	SUI	Ciriaco Sforza
14	MF	CRO	Mihael Mikić
15	GK	AUT	Jürgen Macho
16	DF	GER	Stefan Blank

No.	Pos.	Nation	Player
17	MF	GER	Jochen Seitz
18	MF	ALB	Jürgen Gjasula
19	MF	TUR	Halil Altıntop (Note: Altıntop was born in Gelsenkirchen, West Germany, but also qualified to represent Turkey internationally and represented Turkey at U-18, U-20, U-21 and B level before making his international debut for Turkey in 2005.)
20	MF	GER	Marco Engelhardt
21	GK	GER	Thomas Ernst
23	MF	GER	Thomas Riedl
24	MF	FIN	Mika Nurmela
25	MF	GER	Michael Lehmann
27	GK	GER	Florian Fromlowitz
30	MF	POL	Kamil Kosowski (on loan from Wisła Kraków)
32	DF	CMR	Lucien Mettomo
33	MF	GER	Patrick Wittich
34	DF	GER	Matthias Henn
35	MF	GER	Daniel Damm

=== Left club during season ===
Note: Flags indicate national team as defined under FIFA eligibility rules; some limited exceptions apply. Players may hold more than one non-FIFA nationality.

No.	Pos.	Nation	Player
8	MF	GRE	Dimitrios Grammozis (Note: Grammozis was born in Wuppertal, West Germany, but also qualified to represent Greece internationally through his parents and represented Greece at U-21 level.) (released)
22	FW	GER	Christian Timm (to Greuther Fürth)
28	MF	GER	Stefan Malz (to Arminia Ludwigshafen)

No.	Pos.	Nation	Player
29	MF	GER	Selim Teber (released)
37	DF	GER	Thomas Drescher (to Wacker Burghausen)
—	MF	GER	Torsten Reuter (on loan to 1. FC Saarbrücken)

== Competitions ==
Win Draw Loss Postponed

=== Bundesliga ===
==== League table ====
Pos	Team	Pld	W	D	L	GF	GA	GD	Pts	Qualification or relegation
10	Hannover 96	34	13	6	15	34	36	−2	45	
11	Mainz 05	34	12	7	15	50	55	−5	43	Qualification to UEFA Cup first qualifying round (Note: UEFA awarded another UEFA Cup place to the Bundesliga via a random draw among the fairest associations in 2004–05. The place was given to Mainz 05 for winning the national Fair-play competition in this season.)
12	1. FC Kaiserslautern	34	12	6	16	43	52	−9	42	
13	Arminia Bielefeld	34	11	7	16	37	49	−12	40	
14	1. FC Nürnberg	34	10	8	16	55	63	−8	38	

Rules for classification: 1) points; 2) goal difference; 3) number of goals scored.
