= 2005–06 1. FC Kaiserslautern season =

1. FC Kaiserslautern
2005–06 season
- Manager: Michael Henke (until 19 November); Wolfgang Wolf (from 21 November)
- Stadium: Fritz-Walter-Stadion
- Bundesliga: 16th (relegated)
- DFB-Pokal: Round of 16
- Top goalscorer: League: Halil Altıntop (20); All: Halil Altıntop (21)
Home colours	Away colours

During the 2005–06 German football season, 1. FC Kaiserslautern competed in the Bundesliga.

== Season summary ==
Michael Henke failed to replicate his success as Bayern Munich assistant manager and was soon sacked with Kaiserslautern in relegation danger. Wolfgang Wolf was unable to arrest the decline and Kaiserslautern's 9-year stay in the Bundesliga - which had seen a Champions League quarter-final, UEFA Cup semi-final, DFB-Pokal final, and a league title - came to an end.

== Players ==
=== First-team squad ===
Squad at end of season

Note: Flags indicate national team as defined under FIFA eligibility rules; some limited exceptions apply. Players may hold more than one non-FIFA nationality.

No.	Pos.	Nation	Player
1	GK	AUT	Jürgen Macho
2	DF	COD	Nzelo Hervé Lembi
3	DF	FRA	Mathieu Béda
4	DF	GER	Timo Wenzel
5	DF	GER	Ingo Hertzsch
7	MF	ALB	Ervin Skela
9	FW	GER	Carsten Jancker
10	MF	IRN	Ferydoon Zandi (Note: Zandi was born in Emden, West Germany (now Germany), and represented Germany at U-21 level, but also qualified to represent Iran internationally and made his international debut for Iran in February 2005.)
13	MF	SUI	Ciriaco Sforza
14	MF	CRO	Mihael Mikić
15	DF	BRA	Marcelo Pletsch
16	MF	GER	Axel Bellinghausen
18	FW	CIV	Boubacar Sanogo
19	MF	TUR	Halil Altıntop (Note: Altıntop was born in Gelsenkirchen, West Germany (now Germany), but also qualified to represent Turkey internationally and represented Turkey at U-18, U-20, U-21 and B level before making his international debut for Turkey in 2005.)
20	MF	GER	Marco Engelhardt

No.	Pos.	Nation	Player
21	GK	GER	Thomas Ernst
22	MF	GER	Torsten Reuter
23	MF	GER	Thomas Riedl
24	DF	GER	Matthias Henn
25	MF	GER	Michael Lehmann
26	MF	GER	Daniel Damm
27	GK	GER	Florian Fromlowitz
28	MF	GER	Daniel Halfar
30	MF	SVK	Balázs Borbély
33	DF	GER	Stefan Blank
34	DF	GER	Fabian Schönheim
36	GK	GER	Andreas Clauß
38	FW	GER	Marcel Ziemer
39	MF	GER	Steffen Bohl
40	DF	NOR	Jon Inge Høiland (on loan from Malmö FF)

=== Left club during season ===
Note: Flags indicate national team as defined under FIFA eligibility rules; some limited exceptions apply. Players may hold more than one non-FIFA nationality.

No.	Pos.	Nation	Player
6	MF	GER	Christian Nerlinger (retired)
8	FW	TUR	Berkant Göktan (Note: Göktan was born in Munich, West Germany (now Germany), but also qualified to represent Turkey internationally and represented Turkey at U-21 level.) (released)
17	MF	GER	Jochen Seitz (to Hoffenheim)

No.	Pos.	Nation	Player
30	MF	POL	Kamil Kosowski (on loan from Wisła Kraków)
32	DF	CMR	Lucien Mettomo (to Kayseri Erciyesspor)

== Results ==
=== Bundesliga ===
25 September 2005 7	VfB Stuttgart	1–0	Kaiserslautern	Gottlieb-Daimler-Stadion
17:30 CEST (UTC+2)	Tomasson 10'	Report		Attendance: 35,000; Referee: Thorsten Kinhöfer

2 October 2005 8	1. FC Kaiserslautern	0–3	Hamburger SV
CEST (UTC+2)

5 November 2005 12	Hertha BSC	3–0	1. FC Kaiserslautern
CEST (UTC+2)

19 November 2005 13	1. FC Kaiserslautern	1-3	1. FC Nürnberg	Kaiserslautern
15:30 CET (UTC+01)	Blank 18'	Match Report	17' Banović; 78' L. Müller; 81' Saenko	Stadium: Fritz-Walter-Stadion; Attendance: 29,024; Referee: Michael Weiner; Man of the Match: Cantaluppi

14 December 2005 15	1. FC Kaiserslautern	1–2	Eintracht Frankfurt	Kaiserslautern, Germany
17:30 CEST	Seitz 85'	(Report)	Weissenberger 50'; Copado 58'	Stadium: Fritz-Walter-Stadion; Attendance: 34,000; Referee: Florian Meyer

16	Bayern Munich	2–1	Kaiserslautern
	Ballack 26'; Makaay 54' (pen.)		Sanogo 39'

17	1. FC Kaiserslautern	3–2	VfL Wolfsburg
	Halil Altıntop 45', 61', 83'		Klimowicz 47'; Hanke 54'

7 March 2006 24	Kaiserslautern	1–1	VfB Stuttgart	Fritz-Walter-Stadion
18:00 CEST (UTC+2)	Altintop 15'	Report	Gómez 90+3'	Attendance: 30,593; Referee: Helmut Fleischer

12 March 2006 25	Hamburger SV	3–0	1. FC Kaiserslautern	Hamburg
CEST (UTC+2)				Stadium: Volksparkstadion

8 April 2006 29	1. FC Kaiserslautern	0–2	Hertha BSC
CEST (UTC+2)

16 April 2006 30	1. FC Nürnberg	3-2	1. FC Kaiserslautern	Nuremberg
17:30 CET (UTC+01)	Vittek 12', 87'; Paulus 62'	Match Report	20', 48' Hal. Altıntop	Stadium: Frankenstadion; Attendance: 47,250 (sell-out); Referee: Florian Meyer; Man of the Match: Vittek

3 May 2006 32	Eintracht Frankfurt	2–2	1. FC Kaiserslautern	Frankfurt, Germany
15:30 CEST	Köhler 50'; Amanatidis 70'	(Report)	Reinert 17'; Ziemer 83'	Stadium: Waldstadion; Attendance: 50,000; Referee: Thorsten Kinhöfer

33	Kaiserslautern	1–1	Bayern Munich
	Halil Altıntop 26'		Ottl 68'

34	VfL Wolfsburg	2–2	1. FC Kaiserslautern
	Makiadi 66'; Klimowicz 69'		Halil Altıntop 20'; Ziemer 86'
