= 2007–08 1. FC Kaiserslautern season =

1. FC Kaiserslautern
2007–08 season
- Chairman: Stefan Kuntz (from April)
- Manager: Kjetil Rekdal (until February); Milan Šašić (from 12 February)
- Stadium: Fritz-Walter-Stadion
- 2. Bundesliga: 13th
- DFB-Pokal: Second round
- Top goalscorer: Josh Simpson (6)
Home colours	Away colours

During the 2007–08 German football season, 1. FC Kaiserslautern competed in the 2. Bundesliga.

== Season summary ==
Kjetil Rekdal was sacked as manager in February with Kaiserslautern in 16th place with only 3 wins from their first 19 games. Milan Šašić, who had taken TuS Koblenz from the fourth tier to midtable in the second tier, was appointed as his successor and secured safety on the final day of the season with victory over already promoted 1. FC Köln. However, this represented Kaiserslautern's worst finish in the German league pyramid since the formation of the Bundesliga in 1963.

== Players ==
=== First-team squad ===
Squad at end of season

Note: Flags indicate national team as defined under FIFA eligibility rules; some limited exceptions apply. Players may hold more than one non-FIFA nationality.

No.	Pos.	Nation	Player
2	DF	BFA	Moussa Ouattara
3	DF	FRA	Mathieu Béda
4	DF	GER	Christopher Lamprecht (on loan from Wolfsburg)
5	MF	CMR	Georges Mandjeck (on loan from Stuttgart)
7	MF	GER	Sebastian Reinert
8	MF	AUT	Stefan Lexa
9	FW	SWE	Björn Runström (on loan from Fulham)
10	MF	CAN	Patrice Bernier
11	FW	ROU	Victoraș Iacob
13	DF	GER	Benjamin Weigelt (on loan from Alemannia Aachen)
14	FW	NGA	Emeka Opara
15	MF	CAN	Josh Simpson
16	MF	GER	Axel Bellinghausen
17	DF	GER	Alexander Bugera
19	FW	GER	Christian Henel
20	FW	GER	Marcel Ziemer
21	DF	ALG	Aïmen Demai (Note: Demai was born in Thionville, France, but also qualified to represent Tunisia and Algeria internationally through his mother and father respectively and made his international debut for Algeria in 2003 before making his international debut for Tunisia in February 2009.)

No.	Pos.	Nation	Player
22	MF	GER	Steffen Bohl
23	DF	GER	Sven Müller
24	FW	GER	Alexander Esswein
25	GK	GER	Tobias Sippel
26	FW	SVK	Erik Jendrišek
27	GK	GER	Florian Fromlowitz
28	MF	GER	Torsten Reuter
29	GK	GER	Kevin Trapp
32	DF	GER	Bartosz Broniszewski
33	FW	GER	Christoph Werner
34	DF	GER	Fabian Schönheim
35	GK	USA	Luis Robles
37	FW	GER	Sebastian Stachnik
38	DF	GER	Sascha Kotysch
41	DF	GER	Nassim Banouas
42	MF	KAZ	Sergej Neubauer

=== Left club during season ===
Note: Flags indicate national team as defined under FIFA eligibility rules; some limited exceptions apply. Players may hold more than one non-FIFA nationality.

No.	Pos.	Nation	Player
1	GK	AUT	Jürgen Macho (to AEK Athens)
5	DF	MLI	Boubacar Diarra (to Luzern)

No.	Pos.	Nation	Player
6	MF	DEN	Esben Hansen (to OB)
11	MF	GER	Daniel Halfar (to Arminia Bielefeld)

== Competitions ==
Win Draw Loss Postponed

=== 2. Bundesliga ===
==== League table ====
Pos	Team	Pld	W	D	L	GF	GA	GD	Pts	Promotion or relegation
11	1860 Munich	34	9	14	11	42	45	−3	41	
12	VfL Osnabrück	34	10	10	14	43	54	−11	40	
13	1. FC Kaiserslautern	34	9	12	13	37	37	0	39	
14	FC Augsburg	34	10	8	16	39	51	−12	38	
15	Kickers Offenbach (R)	34	9	11	14	38	60	−22	38	Relegation to 3. Liga

Source: Bundesliga.de
Rules for classification: 1) points; 2) goal difference; 3) number of goals scored.
(R) Relegated
