= 2006–07 1. FC Kaiserslautern season =

1. FC Kaiserslautern
2006–07 season
- Manager: Wolfgang Wolf (until 11 April); Wolfgang Funkel (caretaker)
- Stadium: Fritz-Walter-Stadion
- 2. Bundesliga: 6th
- DFB-Pokal: Second round
Home colours	Away colours

During the 2006–07 German football season, 1. FC Kaiserslautern competed in the 2. Bundesliga.

== Season summary ==
Kaiserslautern failed to challenge for an immediate return to the Bundesliga. Manager Wolfgang Wolf left the club in April; after a brief spell under caretaker Wolfgang Funkel, Kjetil Rekdal was appointed as permanent successor.

== Players ==
=== First-team squad ===
Squad at end of season

Note: Flags indicate national team as defined under FIFA eligibility rules; some limited exceptions apply. Players may hold more than one non-FIFA nationality.

No.	Pos.	Nation	Player
1	GK	AUT	Jürgen Macho
2	DF	BFA	Moussa Ouattara
3	DF	FRA	Mathieu Béda
5	DF	ALG	Ismaël Bouzid (Note: Bouzid was born in Nancy, France, but also qualified to represent Algeria internationally and represented Algeria at U-23 level before making his international debut for Algeria in 2007.)
6	MF	GER	Silvio Meißner (on loan from Stuttgart)
7	MF	GER	Sebastian Reinert
8	MF	AUT	Stefan Lexa
9	FW	ALG	Noureddine Daham
10	FW	GER	Benjamin Auer (on loan from Bochum)
11	MF	GER	Daniel Halfar
13	MF	BRA	Ricardo Villar
14	FW	NGA	Emeka Opara
15	MF	CAN	Josh Simpson
16	MF	GER	Axel Bellinghausen
17	MF	SVK	Balázs Borbély
18	DF	NOR	Azar Karadas (on loan from Benfica)
19	MF	FIN	Aki Riihilahti

No.	Pos.	Nation	Player
20	FW	GER	Marcel Ziemer
21	DF	ALG	Aïmen Demai (Note: Demai was born in Thionville, France, but also qualified to represent Tunisia and Algeria internationally through his mother and father respectively and made his international debut for Algeria in 2003 before making his international debut for Tunisia in February 2009.)
22	MF	GER	Steffen Bohl
23	DF	GER	Sven Müller
24	DF	GER	Matthias Henn
25	GK	GER	Tobias Sippel
26	DF	FRA	Grégory Vignal (on loan from Lens)
27	GK	GER	Florian Fromlowitz
29	DF	GER	Andreas Gaebler
30	MF	HUN	Tamás Hajnal
33	FW	GER	Christoph Werner
34	DF	GER	Fabian Schönheim
35	MF	GER	Michael Lehmann
37	MF	GER	Thomas Klasen
38	DF	GER	Sascha Kotysch
41	GK	USA	Luis Robles

=== Left club during season ===
Note: Flags indicate national team as defined under FIFA eligibility rules; some limited exceptions apply. Players may hold more than one non-FIFA nationality.

No. / Pos. / Nation / Player; 26 / FW / ARG / Nicolás Pavlovich (to Morelia)	No. / Pos. / Nation / Player; 36 / MF / POL / Kamil Kosowski (to Chievo)

== Competitions ==
=== 2. Bundesliga ===
==== League table ====
Pos	Team	Pld	W	D	L	GF	GA	GD	Pts
4	SC Freiburg	34	17	9	8	55	39	+16	60
5	SpVgg Greuther Fürth	34	16	6	12	53	40	+13	54
6	1. FC Kaiserslautern	34	13	14	7	48	34	+14	53
7	FC Augsburg	34	14	10	10	43	32	+11	52
8	1860 Munich	34	14	6	14	47	49	−2	48

Source: Bundesliga.de
Rules for classification: 1) points; 2) goal difference; 3) number of goals scored.

==== Results ====
2. Bundesliga match details
Match	Date	Time	Opponent	Venue	Result F–A	Scorers	Attendance	Referee	Ref.
1	11 August 2006	18:00 CEST	Rot-Weiss Essen	Home	1–0	Hajnal 44'	40,051	Brych	
2	21 August 2006	20:15 CEST	Karlsruher SC	Away	0–2		32,306	Gagelmann	
3	27 August 2006	14:00 CEST	SC Paderborn	Home	2–0	Daham 1', 32'	27,609	Grudzinski	
4	18 September 2006	20:15 CEST	Hansa Rostock	Away	0–2		15,000	Stark	
5	22 September 2006	18:00 CEST	TuS Koblenz	Home	4–3	Şahin 48' (o.g.), Bohl 56', 61', Daham 64'	40,028	Fleischer	
6	29 September 2006	18:00 CEST	SpVgg Unterhaching	Away	1–1	Karadaş 54'	4,700	Gräfe	
7	15 October 2006	14:00 CEST	Erzgebirge Aue	Home	4–0	Reinert 16', 71', Daham 46', Bohl 84'	32,053	Schalk	
8	22 October 2006	14:00 CEST	1860 Munich	Away	1–0	Hajnal 83'	48,800	Meyer	
9	30 October 2006	20:15 CET	SC Freiburg	Home	1–3	Demai 37'	30,736	Sippel	
10	5 November 2006	14:00 CET	MSV Duisburg	Away	1–1	Ouattara 5'	19,086	Wagner	
11	8 November 2006	17:30 CET	Wacker Burghausen	Home	4–0	Bellinghausen 16', Hajnal 57', Müller 66', Lexa 84'	20,061	Walz	
12	13 November 2006	20:15 CET	Greuther Fürth	Away	2–2	Daham 27', Hajnal 55'	5,500	Kircher	
13	17 November 2006	18:00 CET	Kickers Offenbach	Away	1–0	Daham 49'	14,163	Rafati	
14	24 November 2006	18:00 CET	FC Augsburg	Home	0–0		29,054	Schößling	
15	3 December 2006	14:00 CET	Eintracht Braunschweig	Away	1–0	Daham 56'	19,900	Fischer	
16	8 December 2006	18:00 CET	Carl Zeiss Jena	Home	0–0		25,860	Anklam	
17	15 December 2006	18:00 CET	1. FC Köln	Away	2–2	Hajnal 60', Bohl 83'	49,500	Kinhöfer	
18	19 January 2007	18:00 CET	Rot-Weiss Essen	Away	0–0		15,015	Fleischer	
19	29 January 2007	20:15 CET	Karlsruher SC	Home	1–1	Bellinghausen 66'	44,007	Stark	
20	4 February 2007	14:00 CET	SC Paderborn	Away	1–0	Borbély 59'	6,785	Schriever	
21	9 February 2007	18:00 CET	Hansa Rostock	Home	1–1	Vignal 51'	30,372	Sippel	
22	16 February 2007	18:00 CET	TuS Koblenz	Away	0–0		15,000	Aytekin	
23	25 February 2007	14:00 CET	SpVgg Unterhaching	Home	4–0	Ziemer 5', Meißner 24', 39', Bohl 40'	24,094	Seemann	
24	2 March 2007	18:00 CET	Erzgebirge Aue	Away	0–1		14,100	Frank	
25	12 March 2007	20:15 CET	1860 Munich	Home	2–1	Ziemer 16', Meißner 75'	28,752	Wagner	
26	18 March 2007	14:00 CET	SC Freiburg	Away	1–4	Opara 3'	24,000	Gräfe	
27	2 April 2007	20:15 CEST	MSV Duisburg	Home	0–3		39,032	Meyer	
28	8 April 2007	14:00 CEST	Wacker Burghausen	Away	0–0		11,000	Rafati	
29	15 April 2007	14:00 CEST	Greuther Fürth	Home	3–0	Riihilahti 19', Opara 60', Simpson 86'	26,000	Gagelmann	
30	20 April 2007	18:00 CEST	Kickers Offenbach	Home	4–0	Müller 33', Ziemer 37', Simpson 47', Bohl 82'	26,415	Perl	
31	29 April 2007	14:00 CEST	FC Augsburg	Away	2–3	Opara 39', Meißner 59'	23,250	Winkmann	
32	6 May 2007	14:00 CEST	Eintracht Braunschweig	Home	1–1	Meißner 85'	26,569	Stark	
33	13 May 2007	14:00 CEST	Carl Zeiss Jena	Away	1–1	Simpson 10'	12,300	Fleischer	
34	20 May 2007	14:00 CEST	1. FC Köln	Home	2–2	Hajnal 64', 79' (pen.)	48,500	Walz	

=== DFB-Pokal ===
DFB-Pokal match details
Round	Date	Time	Opponent	Venue	Result F–A	Scorers	Attendance	Referee	Ref.
First round	9 September 2006	15:30 CEST	1. FC Gera 03	Away	2–0	Karadas 33', Hajnal 60'	5,450	Meyer	
Second round	25 October 2006	20:30 CEST	Bayern Munich	Away	0–1		51,000	Gagelmann	
