= Drescher =

Drescher (/ˈdrɛʃər/ DRESH-ər, German: [ˈdʁɛʃɐ]; Yiddish: דרעשער [ˈdrɛʃər]) is a surname. Notable people with the surname include:

- Bill Drescher (1921–1968), American baseball player
- Carl Wilhelm Drescher (1850–1925), Austrian violinist and composer
- Dick Drescher (born 1946), American discus thrower
- Fran Drescher (born 1957), American film and television actress and comedian
- Gary Drescher, scientist in the field of artificial intelligence
- Herby Drescher (born 1969), Canadian racing driver
- Jack Drescher (born 1951), American psychiatrist and psychoanalyst
- Ludvig Drescher (1881–1917), Danish amateur football player
- Manuela Drescher (born 1965), East German cross country skier
- Otto Drescher (1895–1944), highly decorated Generalleutnant in the Wehrmacht during World War II
- Seymour Drescher (born 1934), American historian and professor
- Thomas Drescher (born 1978), German football player

== See also ==
- Dresher (surname)
