= Dresher =

Dresher may refer to:

- Dresher (surname)
- Dresher, Pennsylvania
