= Alexander Esswein =

German footballer (born 1990)

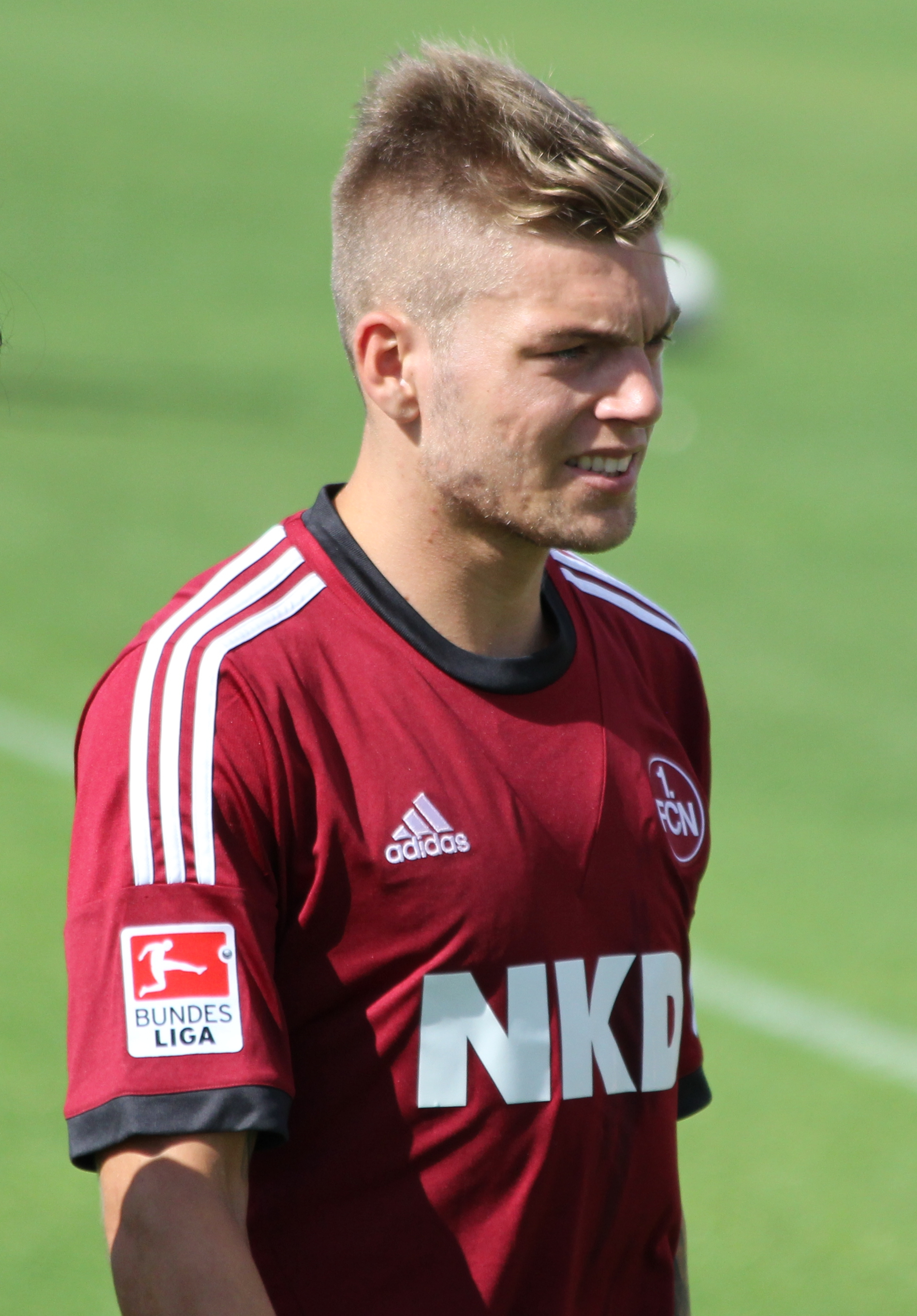
- Esswein with 1. FC Nürnberg in 2013

Personal information
- Date of birth: 25 March 1990 (age 36)
- Place of birth: Worms, West Germany
- Height: 1.83 m (6 ft 0 in)
- Positions: Winger; forward

Team information
- Current team: VfR Mannheim
- Number: 11

Youth career
- 1996–1998: TSV Neuleiningen
- 1998–1999: VfR Frankenthal
- 1999–2002: Waldhof Mannheim
- 2002–2008: 1. FC Kaiserslautern

Senior career*
Years	Team	Apps	(Gls)
2007–2008	1. FC Kaiserslautern	1	(0)
2008–2010	VfL Wolfsburg	8	(0)
2008–2010	VfL Wolfsburg II	41	(4)
2010–2011	Dynamo Dresden	31	(17)
2011–2014	1. FC Nürnberg	58	(6)
2011–2014	1. FC Nürnberg II	1	(0)
2014–2016	FC Augsburg	61	(4)
2016–2020	Hertha BSC	52	(4)
2018–2019	Hertha BSC II	8	(2)
2019	→ VfB Stuttgart (loan)	17	(0)
2020–2023	SV Sandhausen	80	(8)
2023–2024	MSV Duisburg	31	(5)
2024–	VfR Mannheim	67	(18)

International career
2006–2007	Germany U17	12	(3)
2007–2009	Germany U18	7	(3)
2008–2009	Germany U19	7	(2)
2009–2011	Germany U20	3	(3)
2011–2013	Germany U21	13	(5)
Medal record
Germany
U-17 World Cup
Third place	2007
- * Club domestic league appearances and goals as of 24 September 2026

Alexander Esswein (born 25 March 1990; German pronunciation: [alɛkˈsandɐ ˈʔɛsvaɪ̯n]) is a German professional footballer who plays as a winger or forward for Regionalliga Südwest club VfR Mannheim.

== Club career ==
Esswein made his debut in the 2007–08 season. He appeared in a league match during the season. He came on in the 63rd minute in a 2–1 loss to 1. FC Köln on 17 December 2007.

He then transferred to VfL Wolfsburg and split time between the first and second teams. He made four league appearances during the 2008–09 season and four league appearances and a German Cup appearance in the 2009–10 season. He substantially made more appearances for the reserve team. During the 2008–09 season, he made 21 appearances, and during the 2009–10 season, he scored four goals in 20 appearances. Esswein moved to Dynamo Dresden for the 2010–11 season. During the season, he scored 17 goals in 31 league appearances. This includes two goals against Bayern's reserve team, in a 3–1 win on 11 November 2010; Wehen Wiesbaden, in a 3–0 win, on 5 March 2011; and against SpVgg Unterhaching, in a 4–0 win, on 23 April 2011. He also made two appearances in the promotion playoff. This proved to be Esswein's only season at the club.

He transferred to 1. FC Nürnberg for the 2011–12 season. During the 2011–12 season, he scored four goals in 26 league appearances and a goal in three German Cup appearances. His four league goals came against FC Augsburg, in a 1–0 win, on 27 August 2011; Hertha BSC, in a 2–0 win, on 21 January 2012; Köln, in a 2–1 win, on 18 February 2012; and Werder Bremen, in a 1–0 win, on 25 February 2012. His German Cup goal came in the second round against Erzgebirge Aue in a 2–1 win on 26 October 2011. His goal scoring rate would drop in the subsequent seasons with Nürnberg. He dropped down to three goals in 28 appearances in the 2012–13 season and no goals in five appearances during the 2013–14 season. He also made an appearance in the Regionalliga Bayern for the reserve team during the 2013–14 season.

He moved to Augsburg during the January transfer window and made 13 appearances for Augsburg during the 2013–14 season. He scored a goal in 19 appearances during the 2014–15 season. The goal came against Köln on 6 December 2014 in a 2–1 win. Esswein played in the opening match of the 2015–16 season, in a German Cup match against SV Elversberg, a 3–1 extra time win. He then opened his Bundesliga campaign by playing in the first three matchdays, including the 1–0 loss to Hertha BSC in the league opener on 15 August 2015.

=== Later years ===
On 26 August 2016, Esswein signed for Hertha BSC on a four-year deal. On 24 September, he scored his first goal for Hertha in a 3–3 draw against Eintracht Frankfurt.

In January 2019 VfB Stuttgart signed Esswein on loan with a contract option for a permanent deal.

On 9 October 2020, Esswein joined SV Sandhausen on a free transfer.

On 15 August 2023, Esswein signed a two-year contract with MSV Duisburg. After the 2023–24 season, he moved to VfR Mannheim.

== International career ==
Esswein played for the German U-21 national team. Previously he had already played for the U-17, U-18, U-18, U-19 and U-20 national team. He was part of the German U-17 team that finished in third place in the 2007 U-17 World Cup in South Korea. In this tournament, Esswein scored two goals against Trinidad and Tobago in the group-stage and scored the winning goal in the third place playoff against Ghana two minutes into stoppage time.

== Career statistics ==
As of match played 29 November 2025

Appearances and goals by club, season and competition
Club	Season	League			Cup		Continental		Other		Total	
Club	Season	Division	Apps	Goals	Apps	Goals	Apps	Goals	Apps	Goals	Apps	Goals
1. FC Kaiserslautern	2007–08	2. Bundesliga	1	0	0	0	—		—		1	0
VfL Wolfsburg	2008–09	Bundesliga	4	0	0	0	0	0	—		4	0
VfL Wolfsburg	2009–10	Bundesliga	4	0	1	0	0	0	—		5	0
VfL Wolfsburg	Total		8	0	1	0	0	0	—		9	0
VfL Wolfsburg II	2008–09	Regionalliga Nord	21	0	—		—		—		21	0
VfL Wolfsburg II	2009–10	Regionalliga Nord	20	4	—		—		—		20	4
VfL Wolfsburg II	Total		41	4	—		—		—		41	4
Dynamo Dresden	2010–11	3. Liga	31	17	—		—		2 (Note: Appearances in the Promotion playoff.)	0	33	17
1. FC Nürnberg	2011–12	Bundesliga	26	4	3	1	—		—		29	5
1. FC Nürnberg	2012–13	Bundesliga	27	2	1	1	—		—		28	3
1. FC Nürnberg	2013–14	Bundesliga	5	0	0	0	—		—		5	0
1. FC Nürnberg	Total		58	6	4	2	—		—		62	8
1. FC Nürnberg II	2013–14	Regionalliga Bayern	1	0	—		—		—		1	0
FC Augsburg	2013–14	Bundesliga	13	0	0	0	—		—		13	0
FC Augsburg	2014–15	Bundesliga	19	1	0	0	—		—		19	1
FC Augsburg	2015–16	Bundesliga	29	3	3	1	6 (Note: Appearances in the UEFA Europa League.)	0	—		38	4
FC Augsburg	Total		61	4	3	1	6	0	—		70	5
Hertha BSC	2016–17	Bundesliga	29	2	1	0	—		—		30	2
Hertha BSC	2017–18	Bundesliga	16	2	1	0	5	0	—		22	2
Hertha BSC	2018–19	Bundesliga	0	0	0	0	—		—		0	0
Hertha BSC	2019–20	Bundesliga	7	0	1	1	—		—		8	1
Hertha BSC	Total		52	4	3	1	5	0	—		60	5
Hertha BSC II	2018–19	Regionalliga Nordost	6	2	—		—		—		6	2
Hertha BSC II	2019–20	Regionalliga Nordost	2	0	—		—		—		2	0
Hertha BSC II	Total		8	2	—		—		—		8	2
VfB Stuttgart (loan)	2018–19	Bundesliga	17	0	0	0	—		1 (Note: Appearances in the Rekegation playoff.)	0	18	0
SV Sandhausen	2020–21	2. Bundesliga	26	2	1	0	—		—		27	2
SV Sandhausen	2021–22	2. Bundesliga	25	2	1	0	—		—		26	2
SV Sandhausen	2022–23	2. Bundesliga	29	4	3	0	—		—		32	4
SV Sandhausen	Total		80	8	5	0	—		—		85	8
MSV Duisburg	2023–24	3. Liga	31	5	—		—		—		31	5
VfR Mannheim	2024–25	Oberliga BW	27	6	0	0	—		—		27	6
VfR Mannheim	2025–26	Oberliga BW	19	6	0	0	—		4 (Note: Appearances in the Baden Cup)	0	23	6
VfR Mannheim	Total		46	12	0	0	—		4	0	50	12
Career total			429	61	16	4	11	0	7	0	442	59

== Honours ==
VfL Wolfsburg

- Bundesliga: 2008–09
