= Carsten Jancker =

German footballer

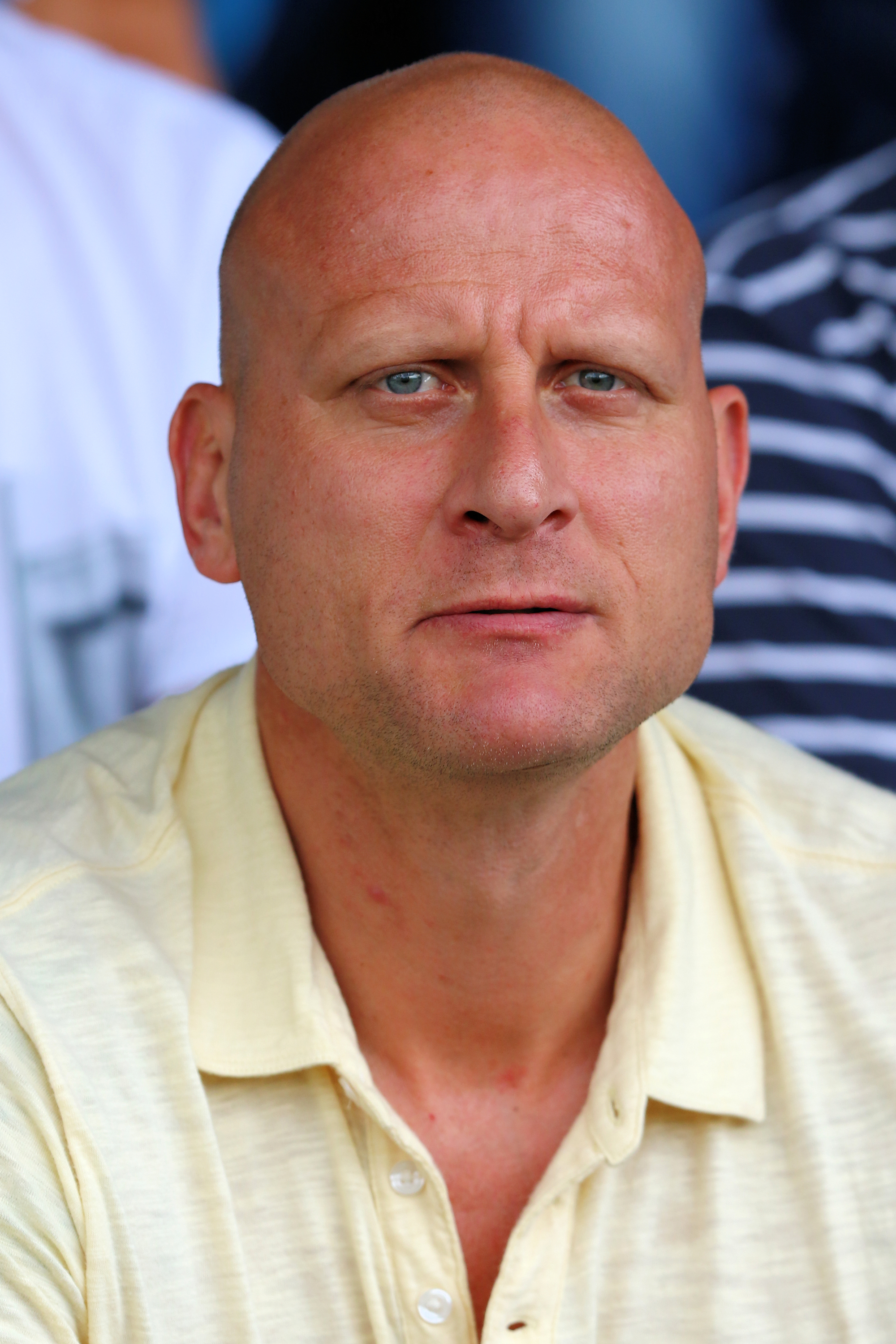
- Jancker in 2019

Personal information
- Date of birth: 28 August 1974 (age 52)
- Place of birth: Grevesmühlen, East Germany
- Height: 1.93 m (6 ft 4 in)
- Position: Forward

Youth career
- –1981: SG Schwarze Pumpe
- 1981–1986: TSG Wismar
- 1986–1991: Hansa Rostock
- 1991–1993: 1. FC Köln

Senior career*
Years	Team	Apps	(Gls)
1993–1996	1. FC Köln	5	(1)
1995–1996	→ Rapid Wien (loan)	27	(7)
1996–2002	Bayern Munich	143	(48)
2002–2004	Udinese	36	(2)
2004–2006	1. FC Kaiserslautern	30	(4)
2006	Shanghai Shenhua	7	(0)
2006–2009	SV Mattersburg	76	(21)
Total		324	(83)

International career
1993–1994	Germany U21	2	(0)
1998–2002	Germany	33	(10)

Managerial career
- 2010: SC Neusiedl 1919 (U14)
- 2010–2013: Rapid Wien (U15)
- 2013–2016: Rapid Wien (assistant)
- 2017–2018: Horn
- 2019–2021: Marchfeld Donauauen
- 2021–2023: DSV Leoben
- 2024–2025: DSV Leoben
- 2025: Austria Klagenfurt (interim)
Medal record
Representing Germany
Men's football
FIFA World Cup
Runner-up	2002 Korea/Japan
- * Club domestic league appearances and goals

Carsten Jancker (born 28 August 1974) is a German football coach and former player. He played as a forward for various teams between 1993 and 2009, including 1. FC Köln, Rapid Wien, Bayern Munich, Udinese Calcio, FC Kaiserslautern, Shanghai Shenhua, and SV Mattersburg, as well as the Germany national team.

== Club career ==
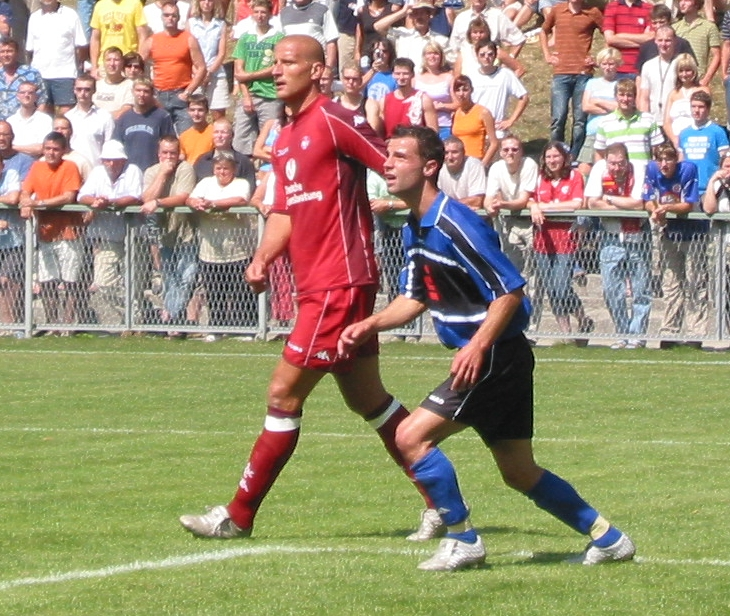
Jancker with 1. FC Kaiserslautern, 2005

Born in Grevesmühlen, Jancker started his career as a trainee at Hansa Rostock before making his Bundesliga debut in 1993 with 1. FC Köln. At the age of 21, he was transferred to Rapid Wien, scoring fourteen goals including seven in the UEFA Cup Winners' Cup to finish as the tournament's top scorer. Thanks to this impressive performance, Jancker spent only one season with the Austrian club before being brought back to Germany to play for Bayern Munich.

Jancker's time at Bayern between 1996 and 2002 was the best period of his career, a spell which included four Bundesliga titles and victory in the 2001 UEFA Champions League. At Bayern, Jancker was partnered with the Brazilian inside-forward Giovane Élber, often rated as one of the Bundesliga's best attacking players.

Jancker left Bayern for Italian side Udinese in 2002, but the move was not a success; over two seasons and 35 games, the forward registered only two goals. Jancker was said to be "too slow and predictable for Serie A" by one football website. In 2004, Jancker returned to Germany with 1. FC Kaiserslautern and showed a slight improvement in form, netting five times in 25 games. In 2004, he also scored six goals in Kaiserslautern's 15–0 first round DFB-Pokal win against FC Schönberg 95, still a record for any player in the competition. This was an improvement over his own previous joint record of five, which he had scored for Bayern Munich against DJK Waldberg in the latter's 16–1 first round cup defeat in 1997. Following the relegation of Kaiserslautern in May 2006, Jancker signed for Chinese team Shanghai Shenhua.

After poor performances, he was dropped in October, and agreed to join SV Mattersburg in the winter transfer window. In June 2009 it was announced that Mattersburg did not want to work with Jancker any further because of his physical condition. In February 2010, he announced his retirement at the end of the current season.

== International career ==
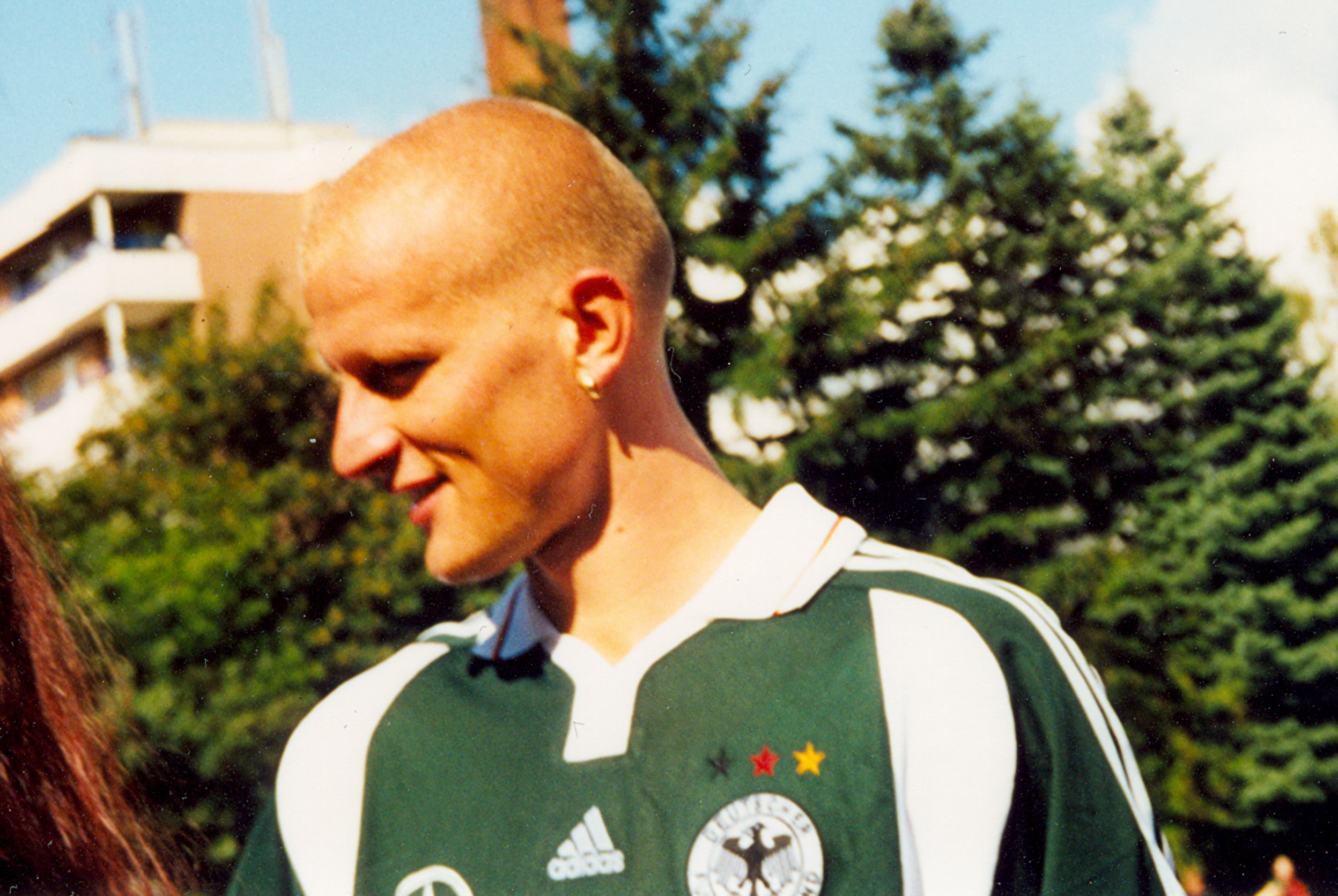
Jancker with the Germany national team in 2000

His performances alongside Elber caught the eye of Germany national coach Erich Ribbeck, who included Jancker in his international squad for Euro 2000.

Instantly recognisable to European football fans, the invariably shaven-headed forward has generally failed to replicate his club form when playing for the national side. A possible explanation for his poorly-regarded international performances might be that the Germany national team lacked a skilful strike partner in the Élber mould. Whatever the reason, Jancker never impressed for Germany; although he was included in Rudi Völler's squad for the 2002 FIFA World Cup – scoring a goal in the team's opening 8–0 win over Saudi Arabia, he was dropped from the team shortly after the tournament and was never recalled. His German international scoring record stands at roughly a goal every three games. He is known for scoring in Germany's 5–1 defeat to England in 2001.

== Style of play ==
A powerful and slow striker, Jancker was tall for a footballer, standing at 1.93 meters (6 ft 4.0 in). His height and strength proved to be an advantage when playing as a target man, as displayed during his most successful days at Bayern Munich. Jancker was known for being an unusual center forward, being weak in the air despite his huge frame, but showing a surprising control of the ball, especially featuring a polished back-to-the-goal game, good link-up play, and a touch for scoring with his hard right-footed shot. He also struggled with injuries throughout his career.

== Coaching career ==
On 18 February 2010, the former international striker took over the U14 team of SC Neusiedl. Additionally he works for the first team in the Austrian Regional League East as an individual coach. On 27 April 2010, Jancker announced that he will work as the new coach of the Under 15 of his former club SK Rapid Wien, starting 1 July 2010. In April 2013, he became assistant coach of the club's Austrian Bundesliga team.

Jancker became the head coach of SV Horn in June 2017. He was fired on 28 November 2018. In April 2019, he was appointed manager of FC Marchfeld Donauauen, starting from 1 May 2019.

On 23 February 2021, Jancker signed with DSV Leoben. He was later dismissed in August 2023. In April 2024, he returned to DSV Leoben. He stepped down in January 2025, just half a season after the club's relegation to the Regionalliga.

In April 2025, he was appointed head coach of top-division side Austria Klagenfurt, with the club fighting to avoid relegation. However, after four matches, they finished bottom of the table and were relegated.

== Career statistics ==
=== Club ===
Appearances and goals by club, season and competition
Club	Season	League			National cup (Note: Includes DFB-Pokal, Austrian Cup, Copa Italia)		League cup (Note: Includes DFL-Ligapokal)		Continental		Other		Total	
Club	Season	Division	Apps	Goals	Apps	Goals	Apps	Goals	Apps	Goals	Apps	Goals	Apps	Goals
1. FC Köln	1993–94	Bundesliga	1	1	1	0	–		–		–		2	1
1. FC Köln	1994–95	Bundesliga	4	0	0	0	–		–		–		4	0
1. FC Köln	1995–96	Bundesliga	0	0	0	0	–		1 (Note: Appearance in UEFA Intertoto Cup)	0	–		1	0
1. FC Köln	Total		5	1	1	0	0	0	1	0	0	0	7	1
Rapid Wien	1995–96	Austrian Bundesliga	27	7	2	3	–		7 (Note: Appearances in UEFA Cup Winners' Cup)	6	–		36	16
Bayern Munich	1996–97	Bundesliga	22	1	1	0	–		1 (Note: Appearance(s) in UEFA Cup)	0	–		24	1
Bayern Munich	1997–98	Bundesliga	29	13	6	6	1	0	8 (Note: Appearances in UEFA Champions League)	4	–		44	23
Bayern Munich	1998–99	Bundesliga	26	13	6	4	1	1	12	3	–		45	21
Bayern Munich	1999–2000	Bundesliga	23	9	3	2	2	0	12	3	–		40	14
Bayern Munich	2000–01	Bundesliga	25	12	2	1	2	2	15	2	–		44	17
Bayern Munich	2001–02	Bundesliga	18	0	4	2	0	0	4	0	2 (Note: One appearance and one goal in UEFA Super Cup, one appearance in Intercontinental Cup)	1	28	3
Bayern Munich	Total		143	48	22	15	6	3	52	12	2	1	225	79
Udinese	2002–03	Serie A	20	1	1	0	–		–		–		21	1
Udinese	2003–04	Serie A	16	1	2	1	–		2	0	–		20	2
Udinese	Total		36	2	3	1	0	0	2	0	0	0	41	3
1. FC Kaiserslautern	2004–05	Bundesliga	25	4	1	6	–		–		–		26	10
1. FC Kaiserslautern	2005–06	Bundesliga	5	0	2	1	–		–		–		7	1
1. FC Kaiserslautern	Total		30	4	3	7	0	0	0	0	–		33	11
Shanghai Shenhua	2006	Chinese Super League	7	0			–		–		–		7	0
SV Mattersburg	2006–07	Austrian Bundesliga	12	2	3	1	–		0	0	–		15	3
SV Mattersburg	2007–08	Austrian Bundesliga	33	12	0	0	–		4	1	–		37	13
SV Mattersburg	2008–09	Austrian Bundesliga	31	7	3	3	–		–		–		34	10
SV Mattersburg	Total		76	21	6	4	0	0	4	1	0	0	86	26
Career total			324	83	37	30	6	3	66	19	2	1	435	136

=== International ===
Appearances and goals by national team and year
National team	Year	Apps	Goals
Germany	1998	1	0
Germany	1999	4	0
Germany	2000	7	3
Germany	2001	9	3
Germany	2002	12	4
Total		33	10

Scores and results list Germany's goal tally first, score column indicates score after each Jancker goal.

List of international goals scored by Carsten Jancker
No.	Date	Venue	Opponent	Score	Result	Competition
1	3 June 2000	Easycredit-Stadion, Nuremberg	Czech Republic	1–0	3–2	Friendly
2	7 June 2000	Dreisamstadion, Freiburg	Liechtenstein	6–2	8–2	Friendly
3	7 June 2000	Dreisamstadion, Freiburg	Liechtenstein	8–2	8–2	Friendly
4	2 June 2001	Helsinki Olympic Stadium, Helsinki	Finland	2–2	2–2	2002 FIFA World Cup qualification
5	15 August 2001	Ferenc Puskás Stadium, Budapest	Hungary	3–0	5–2	Friendly
6	1 September 2001	Olympiastadion, Munich	England	1–0	1–5	2002 FIFA World Cup qualification
7	9 May 2002	Dreisamstadion, Freiburg	Kuwait	7–0	7–0	Friendly
8	1 June 2002	Sapporo Dome, Sapporo	Saudi Arabia	4–0	8–0	2002 FIFA World Cup
9	21 August 2002	Vasil Levski National Stadium, Sofia	Bulgaria	2–2	2–2	Friendly
10	11 October 2002	Asim Ferhatović Hase Stadium, Sarajevo	Bosnia and Herzegovina	1–1	1–1	Friendly

== Honours ==
Rapid Wien

- Austrian Bundesliga: 1995–96
- UEFA Cup Winners' Cup runner-up: 1995–96

Bayern Munich

- Bundesliga: 1996–97, 1998–99, 1999–2000, 2000–01
- DFB-Pokal: 1997–98, 1999–2000
- DFB-Ligapokal: 1997, 1998, 1999, 2000
- UEFA Champions League: 2000–01
- Intercontinental Cup: 2001
