= 2011–12 1. FC Nürnberg season =

1. FC Nürnberg
2011–12 season
- Manager: Dieter Hecking
- Stadium: Frankenstadion
- Bundesliga: 10th
- DFB-Pokal: 3rd Round
- Top goalscorer: League: Tomáš Pekhart/Daniel Didavi (9); All: Tomáš Pekhart (10)
- Highest home attendance: 48,548 vs Bayern Munich and Leverkusen
- Lowest home attendance: 35,389 vs 1899 Hoffenheim
- Average home league attendance: 41,968
Home colours	Away colours	Third colours

The 2011–12 1. FC Nürnberg season is the 112th season in the club's football history.

== Match results ==
=== Legend ===
Win Draw Loss

=== Bundesliga ===
6 August 2011 1	Hertha BSC	0–1	1. FC Nürnberg	Berlin
18:30 CEST (UTC+02)		Match Report	80' Pekhart	Stadium: Olympic Stadium; Attendance: 61,118; Referee: Peter Gagelmann; Man of the Match: Wollscheid

13 August 2011 2	1. FC Nürnberg	1–2	Hannover 96	Nuremberg
15:30 CEST (UTC+02)	Pekhart 56'	Match Report	16' Abdellaoue; 26' (pen.) Rausch	Stadium: Frankenstadion; Attendance: 37,212; Referee: Marco Fritz; Man of the Match: Abdellaoue

20 August 2011 3	Borussia Dortmund	2–0	1. FC Nürnberg	Dortmund
15:30 CEST (UTC+02)	Lewandowski 50'; Großkreutz 80'	Match Report		Stadium: Westfalenstadion; Attendance: 78,400; Referee: Felix Zwayer; Man of the Match: Simons

27 August 2011 4	1. FC Nürnberg	1–0	FC Augsburg	Nuremberg
15:30 CEST (UTC+02)	Esswein 76'	Match Report		Stadium: Frankenstadion; Attendance: 43,071; Referee: Thorsten Kinhöfer; Man of the Match: Esswein

11 September 2011 5	1. FC Köln	1–2	1. FC Nürnberg	Cologne
15:30 CEST	Chihi 39'	Match Report	31' (pen.), 35' (pen.) Simons	Stadium: RheinEnergieStadion; Attendance: 43,200; Referee: Michael Weiner; Man of the Match: Simons

17 September 2011 6	1. FC Nürnberg	1–1	Werder Bremen	Nuremberg
15:30 CEST	Wollscheid 62'	Match Report	24' Ekici	Stadium: Frankenstadion; Attendance: 43,121; Referee: Dr. Jochen Drees; Man of the Match: Simons

24 September 2011 7	Borussia Mönchengladbach	1–0	1. FC Nürnberg	Mönchengladbach
15:30 CEST (UTC+02)	Daems 76' (pen.)	Match Report		Stadium: Borussia-Park; Attendance: 51,117; Referee: Knut Kircher; Man of the Match: Reus

1 October 2011 8	1. FC Nürnberg	3–3	Mainz 05	Nuremberg
15:30 CEST (UTC+02)	Feulner 5'; Mak 19'; Pekhart 82'	Match Report	Bungert 32'; Choupo-Moting 45'; Ivanschitz 52'	Stadium: Frankenstadion; Attendance: 38,107; Referee: Peter Gagelmann; Man of the Match: Mak

15 October 2011 9	VfL Wolfsburg	2–1	1. FC Nürnberg	Wolfsburg
15:30 CEST (UTC+02)	Mandžukić 24', 83' (pen.)	Match Report	70' Eigler	Stadium: Volkswagen Arena; Attendance: 27,112; Referee: Tobias Welz; Man of the Match: Mandžukić

22 October 2011 10	1. FC Nürnberg	2–2	VfB Stuttgart	Nuremberg
15:30 CEST (UTC+02)	Simons 9'; Wollscheid 70'	Match Report	61' (pen.) Kuzmanović; 84' Rodríguez	Stadium: Frankenstadion; Attendance: 46,486; Referee: Markus Wingenbach; Man of the Match: Wollscheid

29 October 2011 11	Bayern Munich	4–0	1. FC Nürnberg	Munich
15:30 CEST (UTC+02)	Gómez 2', 68'; Schweinsteiger 19'; Ribéry 39'	Report		Stadium: Allianz Arena; Attendance: 69,000 (sell-out); Referee: Florian Meyer; Man of the Match: Gómez

5 November 2011 12	1. FC Nürnberg	1–2	SC Freiburg	Nuremberg
15:30 CET (UTC+01)	Frantz 32'	Match Report	34' Rosenthal; 90+3' (pen.) Cissé	Stadium: Frankenstadion; Attendance: 38,026; Referee: Christian Dingert; Man of the Match: Rosenthal

19 November 2011 13	Schalke 04	4–0	1. FC Nürnberg	Gelsenkirchen
15:30 CET (UTC+01)	Huntelaar 13', 66'; Raúl 39'; Holtby 84'	Match Report		Stadium: Veltins-Arena; Attendance: 61,673 (sell-out); Referee: Knut Kircher; Man of the Match: Huntelaar

26 November 2011 14	1. FC Nürnberg	1–0	1. FC Kaiserslautern	Nuremberg
15:30 CET (UTC+01)	Chandler 13'	Match Report		Stadium: Frankenstadion; Attendance: 37,266; Referee: Tobias Welz; Man of the Match: Hegeler

4 December 2011 15	Hamburger SV	2–0	1. FC Nürnberg	Hamburg
15:30 CET (UTC+01)	Guerrero 23'; Jansen 62'	Match Report		Stadium: Volksparkstadion; Attendance: 45,473; Referee: Thorsten Kinhöfer; Man of the Match: Guerrero

10 December 2011 16	1. FC Nürnberg	0–2	1899 Hoffenheim	Nuremberg
15:30 CET (UTC+01)		Match Report	39', 56' Ibišević	Stadium: Frankenstadion; Attendance: 35,389; Referee: Jochen Drees; Man of the Match: Ibišević

17 December 2011 17	Bayer Leverkusen	0–3	1. FC Nürnberg	Leverkusen
15:30 CET (UTC+01)		Match Report	8' Didavi; 22' Hegeler; 73' Pekhart	Stadium: BayArena; Attendance: 29,239; Referee: Markus Schmidt; Man of the Match: Schäfer

21 January 2012 18	1. FC Nürnberg	2–0	Hertha BSC	Nuremberg
15:30 CET (UTC+01)	Esswein 43'; Maroh 85'	Match Report		Stadium: Frankenstadion; Attendance: 39,117; Referee: Peter Gagelmann; Man of the Match: Maroh

27 January 2012 19	Hannover 96	1–0	1. FC Nürnberg	Hannover
20:30 CET (UTC+01)	Abdellaoue 18'	Match Report		Stadium: AWD-Arena; Attendance: 35,400; Referee: Marco Fritz; Man of the Match: Abdellaoue

3 February 2012 20	1. FC Nürnberg	0–2	Borussia Dortmund	Nuremberg
20:30 CET (UTC+01)		Match Report	48' Kehl; 82' Barrios	Stadium: Frankenstadion; Attendance: 45,572; Referee: Florian Meyer; Man of the Match: Kehl

12 February 2012 21	FC Augsburg	0–0	1. FC Nürnberg	Augsburg
15:30 CET (UTC+01)		Match Report		Stadium: SGL arena Attendance: 30,660 (sell-out); Referee: Dr. Jochen Drees; Man of the Match: Jentzsch

18 February 2012 22	1. FC Nürnberg	2–1	1. FC Köln	Nuremberg
15:30 CET (UTC+01)	Esswein 28'; Pekhart 85'	Match Report	66' Novaković	Stadium: Frankenstadion; Attendance: 38,101; Referee: Christian Dingert; Man of the Match: Esswein

25 February 2012 23	Werder Bremen	0–1	1. FC Nürnberg	Bremen
18:30 CET (UTC+01)		Match Report	65' Esswein	Stadium: Weserstadion; Attendance: 40,204; Referee: Felix Zwayer; Man of the Match: Wollscheid

4 March 2012 24	1. FC Nürnberg	1–0	Borussia Mönchengladbach	Nuremberg
15:30 CET (UTC+01)	Bunjaku 87'	Match Report		Stadium: Frankenstadion; Attendance: 45,675; Referee: Tobias Welz; Man of the Match: Maroh

10 March 2012 25	Mainz 05	2–1	1. FC Nürnberg	Mainz
15:30 CET (UTC+01)	N. Müller 1'; Zidan 22'	Match Report	64' Didavi	Stadium: Coface Arena; Attendance: 34,000 (sell-out); Referee: Thorsten Kinhöfer; Man of the Match: Bungert

17 March 2012 26	1. FC Nürnberg	1–3	VfL Wolfsburg	Nuremberg
15:30 CET (UTC+01)	Didavi 9'	Match Report	15' Mandžukić; 24', 53' Helmes	Stadium: Frankenstadion; Attendance: 39,320; Referee: Guido Winkmann; Man of the Match: Helmes

25 March 2012 27	VfB Stuttgart	1–0	1. FC Nürnberg	Stuttgart
15:30 CET (UTC+01)	Cacau 78'	Match Report		Stadium: Mercedes-Benz Arena; Attendance: 55,800; Referee: Christian Dingert; Man of the Match: Chandler

31 March 2012 28	1. FC Nürnberg	0–1	Bayern Munich	Nuremberg
15:30 CEST (UTC+02)		Match Report	69' Robben	Stadium: Frankenstadion; Attendance: 48,548 (sell-out); Referee: Felix Zwayer; Man of the Match: Robben

7 April 2012 29	SC Freiburg	2–2	1. FC Nürnberg	Freiburg
15:30 CEST (UTC+02)	D. Caligiuri 53' (pen.); Makiadi 79' (pen.)	Match Report	8' Didavi; 45' Pekhart	Stadium: Mage Solar Stadion; Attendance: 24,000 (sell-out); Referee: Thorsten Kinhöfer; Man of the Match: Makiadi

11 April 2012 30	1. FC Nürnberg	4–1	Schalke 04	Nuremberg
20:00 CEST (UTC+02)	Balitsch 25'; Simons 37' (pen.); Didavi 45', 87'	Match Report	85' Holtby	Stadium: Frankenstadion; Attendance: 44,031; Referee: Florian Meyer; Man of the Match: Didavi

14 April 2012 31	1. FC Kaiserslautern	0–2	1. FC Nürnberg	Kaiserslautern
15:30 CEST (UTC+02)		Match Report	42' Didavi; 73' Pekhart	Stadium: Fritz-Walter-Stadion; Attendance: 42,552; Referee: Marco Fritz; Man of the Match: Didavi

21 April 2012 32	1. FC Nürnberg	1–1	Hamburger SV	Nuremberg
15:30 CEST (UTC+02)	Didavi 64'	Match Report	59' Son	Stadium: Frankenstadion; Attendance: 45,873; Referee: Peter Gagelmann; Man of the Match: Didavi

28 April 2012 33	1899 Hoffenheim	2–3	1. FC Nürnberg	Sinsheim
15:30 CEST (UTC+02)	Beck 22'; Braafheid 88'	Match Report	9', 71' Pekhart; 45' Didavi	Stadium: Rhein-Neckar Arena; Attendance: 30,150 (sell-out); Referee: Knut Kircher; Man of the Match: Pekhart

5 May 2012 34	1. FC Nürnberg	1–4	Bayer Leverkusen	Nuremberg
15:30 CEST (UTC+02)	Mak 58'	Match Report	6', 32', 89' Kießling; 77' Schürrle	Stadium: Frankenstadion; Attendance: 48,548 (sell-out); Referee: Guido Winkmann; Man of the Match: Kießling

=== DFB-Pokal ===
30 July 2011 1	Arminia Bielefeld	1–5	1. FC Nürnberg	Bielefeld
15:30 CEST (UTC+02)	Jerat 15'	Match Report	26', 35', 40' Feulner; 65' Mak; 71' Pekhart	Stadium: Bielefelder Alm; Attendance: 12,705; Referee: Norbert Grudzinski; Man of the Match: Feulner

26 October 2011 2	Erzgebirge Aue	1–2	1. FC Nürnberg	Aue
20:30 CEST (UTC+02)	König 78'	Match Report	64' Esswein; 68' Wießmeier	Stadium: Sparkassen-Erzgebirgsstadion; Attendance: 13,000; Referee: Thorsten Kinhöfer; Man of the Match: Esswein

20 December 2011 3	1. FC Nürnberg	0–1	Greuther Fürth	Nuremberg
19:00 CET (UTC+01)		Match Report	15' Prib	Stadium: Frankenstadion; Attendance: 48,548 (sell-out); Referee: Knut Kircher; Man of the Match: Schmidtgal

== Player information ==
=== Roster and statistics ===
Squad Season 2011–12 Sources:
Player					Bundesliga		DFB-Pokal		Totals	
Player	Nat.	Birthday	at FCN since	Previous club	Matches	Goals	Matches	Goal	Matches	Goals
Goalkeepers
Raphael Schäfer	(Germany)	30 January 1979	2008	VfB Stuttgart	25	0	2	0	27	0
Patrick Rakovsky	(Germany)	2 June 1993	2011	Schalke 04 youth	2	0	0	0	2	0
Alexander Stephan	(Germany)	15 September 1986	2006	1. FC Nürnberg II	8	0	1	0	9	0
Defenders
Per Nilsson	(Sweden)	15 September 1982	2010	1899 Hoffenheim	5	0	0	0	5	0
Dominic Maroh	(Germany)	4 March 1987	2008	SSV Reutlingen	21	1	2	0	23	1
Timm Klose	(Switzerland)	9 May 1988	2011	Thun	13	0	1	0	14	0
Juri Judt	(Germany)	24 July 1986	2008	Greuther Fürth	2	0	0	0	2	0
Marvin Plattenhardt	(Germany)	26 January 1992	2010	1. FC Nürnberg II	9	0	2	0	11	0
Javier Pinola	(Argentina)	24 February 1983	2005	Racing Club	17	0	1	0	18	0
Timothy Chandler	(United States)	29 March 1990	2010	Eintracht Frankfurt	30	1	3	0	33	1
Philipp Wollscheid	(Germany)	6 March 1989	2009	1. FC Nürnberg II	33	2	3	0	36	2
Midfielders
Timmy Simons	(Belgium)	11 December 1976	2010	PSV	34	4	3	0	37	4
Hanno Balitsch	(Germany)	2 January 1981	2012	Bayer Leverkusen	12	1	0	0	12	1
Markus Feulner	(Germany)	12 February 1982	2011	Borussia Dortmund	28	1	2	3	30	4
Jens Hegeler	(Germany)	22 January 1988	2010	Bayer Leverkusen	31	1	3	0	34	1
Róbert Mak	(Slovakia)	8 March 1991	2010	Manchester City	17	2	2	1	19	3
Mike Frantz	(Germany)	14 October 1986	2008	1. FC Saarbrücken	13	1	0	0	13	1
Almog Cohen	(Israel)	1 September 1988	2010	Maccabi Netanya	24	0	2	0	26	0
Daniel Didavi	(Germany)	21 February 1990	2011	VfB Stuttgart	23	9	2	0	25	9
Adam Hloušek	(Czech Republic)	20 December 1988	2012	Baumit Jablonec	11	0	0	0	11	0
Wilson Kamavuaka	(Democratic Republic of the Congo)	29 March 1990	2011	1899 Hoffenheim	5	0	0	0	5	0
Markus Mendler	(Germany)	7 January 1993	2010	1. FC Nürnberg youth	7	0	2	0	9	0
Julian Wießmeier	(Germany)	4 November 1992	2011	1. FC Nürnberg youth	8	0	1	1	9	1
Forwards
Christian Eigler	(Germany)	1 January 1984	2008	Arminia Bielefeld	23	1	2	0	25	1
Tomáš Pekhart	(Czech Republic)	26 May 1989	2011	Baumit Jablonec	31	9	3	1	34	10
Albert Bunjaku	(Switzerland)	29 November 1983	2009	Rot-Weiß Erfurt	17	1	2	0	19	1
Alexander Esswein	(Germany)	25 March 1990	2011	Dynamo Dresden	26	4	3	1	29	5

== Kits ==
Home	Away	Away Alternate	Third	Fourth

Type	Shirt	Shorts	Socks	First appearance / Info
Home	Dark red	Black	Dark red	
Away	White	White	White	
Away Alt.	White	White	Red	DFB-Pokal, Round 1, July 30 against Bielefeld
Third	Orange	Black	Orange	
Fourth	Black	Black	Black	Bundesliga, Match 25, March 10 against Mainz → 2012–13 Third Kit
