= SV Morlautern =

German football club

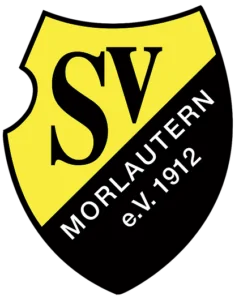
- Full name: Sportverein Morlautern e.V. 1912
- Ground: Stadion Kieferberg
- Chairman: Reiner Engbarth
- Head Coach: Patrick Wittich
- League: Verbandsliga Südwest (VI)
- 2024–25: Oberliga Rheinland-Pfalz/Saar, 18th of 18 (relegated)

SV Morlautern is a German association football club from the Morlautern suburb of the city of Kaiserslautern, Rhineland-Palatinate. The club's greatest success has been promotion to the tier five Oberliga Rheinland-Pfalz/Saar in 2016.

== History ==
The club dates back to 15 July 1912 when the football club SpVgg Morlautern was formed. In the following years two more football clubs were formed in Morlautern, FV-Germania and FC Bayern, the Palatinate being part of the Kingdom of Bavaria at the time, and the three clubs merged to form the current SV Morlautern 1912 on 9 September 1919.

SV Morlautern played in local amateur football league for most of its history. The club became the last station in the career of Werner Kohlmeyer, former 1. FC Kaiserslautern player and member of the West German 1954 FIFA World Cup winning team. The club organised a two-yearly youth tournament in the latters name after Kohlmeyer's early death, the Werner-Kohlmeyer-Memorial-Tournament.

The club began to rise through the league system from 2009 onwards. Four championships and promotions took the club from the tier ten Kreisliga to the tier six Verbandsliga Südwest from 2010 to 2013. After finishing fourth and third in the Verbandsliga in 2014 and 2015 the club came second in 2015–16 and, after two wins in the promotion round, moved up to the Oberliga Rheinland-Pfalz/Saar for the first time.

== Honours ==
The club's honours:

- Landesliga Südwest West
  - Champions:2012–13
- Bezirksliga Westpfalz
  - Champions: 2011–12
- Bezirksklasse Westpfalz Nord
  - Champions: 2010–11
- Kreisliga Kaiserslautern
  - Champions: 2003–04, 2009–10
- Southwestern Cup
  - Winners: 2017

== Recent seasons ==
The recent season-by-season performance of the club:

Season	Division	Tier	Position
2003–04	Kreisliga Kaiserslautern	IX	1st ↑
2004–05	Bezirksklasse Westpfalz Nord	VIII	8th
2005–06	Bezirksklasse Westpfalz Nord	VIII	17th ↓
2006–07	Kreisliga Kaiserslautern	IX	8th
2007–08	Kreisliga Kaiserslautern	IX	6th
2008–09	Kreisliga Kaiserslautern	X	9th
2009–10	Kreisliga Kaiserslautern	X	1st ↑
2010–11	Bezirksklasse Westpfalz Nord	IX	1st ↑
2011–12	Bezirksliga Westpfalz	VIII	1st ↑
2012–13	Landesliga Südwest West	VII	1st ↑
2013–14	Verbandsliga Südwest	VI	4th
2014–15	Verbandsliga Südwest	VI	3rd
2015–16	Verbandsliga Südwest	VI	2nd ↑
2016–17	Oberliga Rheinland-Pfalz/Saar	V	

- With the introduction of the 3. Liga in 2008 as the new third tier, below the 2. Bundesliga, all leagues below dropped one tier.

↑ Promoted	↓ Relegated
