= Florian Fromlowitz =

German footballer

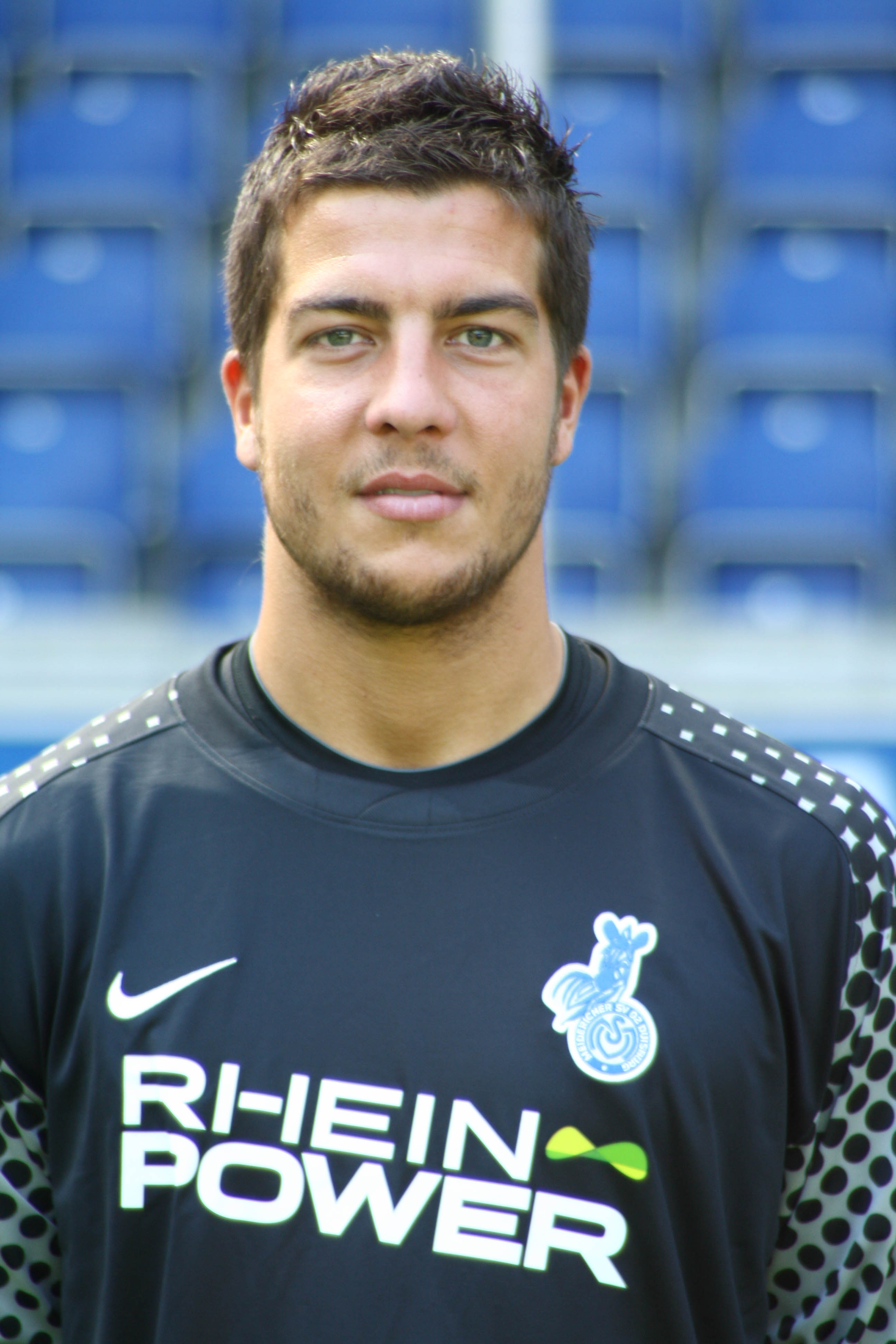
- Fromlowitz with MSV Duisburg in 2011

Personal information
- Date of birth: 2 July 1986 (age 40)
- Place of birth: Kaiserslautern, West Germany
- Height: 1.88 m (6 ft 2 in)
- Position: Goalkeeper

Youth career
- 1992–2004: 1. FC Kaiserslautern

Senior career*
Years	Team	Apps	(Gls)
2005–2007	1. FC Kaiserslautern II	43	(0)
2004–2008	1. FC Kaiserslautern	22	(0)
2008–2011	Hannover 96	58	(0)
2011–2012	MSV Duisburg	14	(0)
2012–2014	Dynamo Dresden	1	(0)
2014–2015	SV Wehen Wiesbaden	2	(0)
2014	SV Wehen Wiesbaden II	2	(0)
2015–2017	FC 08 Homburg	10	(0)
Total		152	(0)

International career
2001–2002	Germany U-16	6	(0)
2007–2009	Germany U-21	12	(0)
Medal record
Men's football
Representing Germany
UEFA European Under-21 Championship
Winner	2009 Sweden
- * Club domestic league appearances and goals

Florian Fromlowitz (born 2 July 1986) is a German former professional footballer who played as a goalkeeper. He is also a former Germany U21 international.

== Club career ==
=== 1. FC Kaiserslautern ===
Fromlowitz advanced through the youth ranks of 1. FC Kaiserslautern, signing his first professional contract with the club in the summer of 2004. He made his Bundesliga debut on 25 February 2006 against 1. FSV Mainz 05, coming on as a substitute for the injured Jürgen Macho, and kept his place between the sticks for the remainder of the season, at the end of which the club were relegated. He was again replaced by Macho for the 2006–07 season, in which he did not make any appearances in the 2. Bundesliga. In August 2007, he was chosen by the club's new manager, Kjetil Rekdal, as Kaiserslautern's first-choice goalkeeper for the 2007–08 season, prompting Macho to leave the club during the month. However, he sustained an injury after 10 league matches and did not play again during the season.

=== Hannover ===
On 2 April 2008, Fromlowitz joined Bundesliga side Hannover 96 on a three-year contract with the beginning of the 2008–09 season, to play understudy to Robert Enke. He became the number one goalkeeper at the club following the unexpected death of Enke on 10 November 2009, but lost his place during the second half of the 2010–11 season to Ron-Robert Zieler.

=== Duisburg ===
In June 2011, he signed a contract with MSV Duisburg on a two-year deal, but left for Dynamo Dresden a year later.

=== Later years ===
After two years with Dynamo he signed for SV Wehen Wiesbaden.

In May 2017, Fromlowitz announced his decision to end his career.

== Career statistics ==
=== Club ===
Appearances and goals by club, season and competition
Club	Season	League			Cup		Other		Total	
Club	Season	Division	Apps	Goals	Apps	Goals	Apps	Goals	Apps	Goals
1. FC Kaiserslautern II	2004–05	Oberliga Südwest	24	0	—		—		24	0
1. FC Kaiserslautern II	2005–06	Regionalliga Süd	19	0	—		—		19	0
1. FC Kaiserslautern II	Total		43	0	—		—		43	0
1. FC Kaiserslautern	2004–05	Bundesliga	0	0	0	0	—		0	0
1. FC Kaiserslautern	2005–06	Bundesliga	12	0	0	0	—		12	0
1. FC Kaiserslautern	2006–07	2. Bundesliga	0	0	1	0	—		1	0
1. FC Kaiserslautern	2007–08	2. Bundesliga	10	0	1	0	—		11	0
1. FC Kaiserslautern	Total		22	0	2	0	—		24	0
Hannover 96	2008–09	Bundesliga	10	0	0	0	—		10	0
Hannover 96	2009–10	Bundesliga	28	0	0	0	—		28	0
Hannover 96	2010–11	Bundesliga	20	0	1	0	—		21	0
Hannover 96	Total		58	0	1	0	—		59	0
MSV Duisburg	2011–12	2. Bundesliga	14	0	2	0	—		16	0
Dynamo Dresden	2012–13	2. Bundesliga	1	0	1	0	—		2	0
Dynamo Dresden	2013–14	2. Bundesliga	0	0	0	0	—		0	0
Dynamo Dresden	Total		1	0	1	0	—		2	0
SV Wehen Wiesbaden	2014–15	3. Liga	2	0	1	0	—		3	0
SV Wehen Wiesbaden II	2014–15	Hessenliga	2	0	—		—		2	0
FC 08 Homburg	2015–16	Regionalliga Südwest	10	0	—		—		10	0
Career total			152	0	8	0	0	0	160	0

== Honours ==
- UEFA Under-21 Championship: 2009
