= Sergej Neubauer =

Kazakhstani footballer

Personal information
- Full name: Sergej Neubauer
- Date of birth: 14 April 1985 (age 41)
- Place of birth: Karaganda, Kazakh SSR, Soviet Union
- Height: 1.88 m (6 ft 2 in)
- Position: Midfielder

Youth career
- 1992–2001: JSG Schauenburg
- 2001–2004: Hessen Kassel
- 2004–2006: KSV Baunatal

Senior career*
Years	Team	Apps	(Gls)
2006–2009	1. FC Kaiserslautern II	75	(2)
2007–2008	1. FC Kaiserslautern	6	(0)
2009–2010	Rot-Weiss Essen	15	(1)
2010–2012	Sportfreunde Lotte	34	(0)
- * Club domestic league appearances and goals

Sergej Neubauer (born 14 April 1985) is a Kazakhstani former professional footballer who played as a midfielder.

== Career ==
Neubauer joined 1. FC Kaiserslautern in 2006 coming from fourth league club KSV Baunatal. In his first season, he had a place in the starting eleven of the second team playing in the Regionalliga Süd. During the 2007–08 season. he was given the opportunity to play six times for the first team by former FCK manager Kjetil Rekdal.

In the summer of 2009, Neubauer moved on to Rot-Weiss Essen and one year later to Sportfreunde Lotte.
