= Dresher (surname) =

Dresher is a surname. Notable people with the surname include:

- Melvin Dresher (1911–1992), Polish-born American mathematician
- Paul Dresher (born 1951), American composer

== See also ==
- Drescher
