= Nassim Banouas =

German footballer (born 1986)

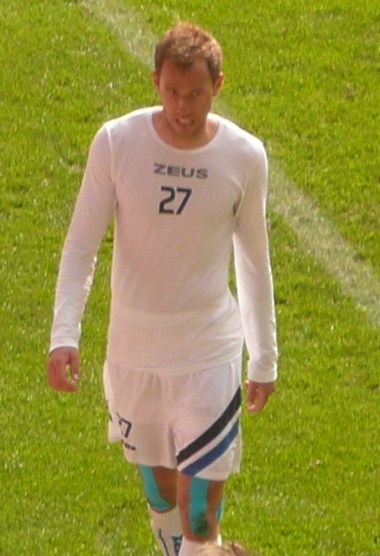
- Nassium Banouas in 2010

Personal information
- Full name: Nassim Banouas
- Date of birth: 8 September 1986 (age 40)
- Place of birth: Worms, West Germany
- Height: 1.87 m (6 ft 1 1/2 in)
- Position: Defender

Youth career
- TuS Neuhausen
- –1998: SV Horchheim
- 1998–2003: 1. FC Kaiserslautern
- 2003–2005: 1. FSV Mainz 05

Senior career*
Years	Team	Apps	(Gls)
2005–2006	1. FSV Mainz 05 II	11	(4)
2006	1. FSV Mainz 05	0	(0)
2006–2007	Sportfreunde Siegen	16	(1)
2007	1. FC Kaiserslautern II	27	(4)
2008	1. FC Kaiserslautern	2	(0)
2008	Kickers Offenbach	9	(0)
2009–2010	Kickers Offenbach II	14	(0)
2010	Waldhof Mannheim	17	(0)
2010–2011	FC Homburg	30	(5)
2011–2012	SV Elversberg	12	(0)
2012–2013	Wormatia Worms	21	(0)
2013–2014	Waldhof Mannheim	30	(2)
2014–2015	SVN Zweibrücken	16	(0)
2015	SV Wiesbaden	1	(0)
Total		206	(16)
- * Club domestic league appearances and goals

Nassim Banouas (born 8 September 1986) is a German retired footballer who played as a defender.

== Career ==
Banouas previously played for 1. FSV Mainz 05, Sportfreunde Siegen and 1. FC Kaiserslautern before signing with Kickers Offenbach.

== Personal life ==
His father is Algerian while his mother is German.
