= Carl Wilhelm Drescher =

Austrian violinist and composer

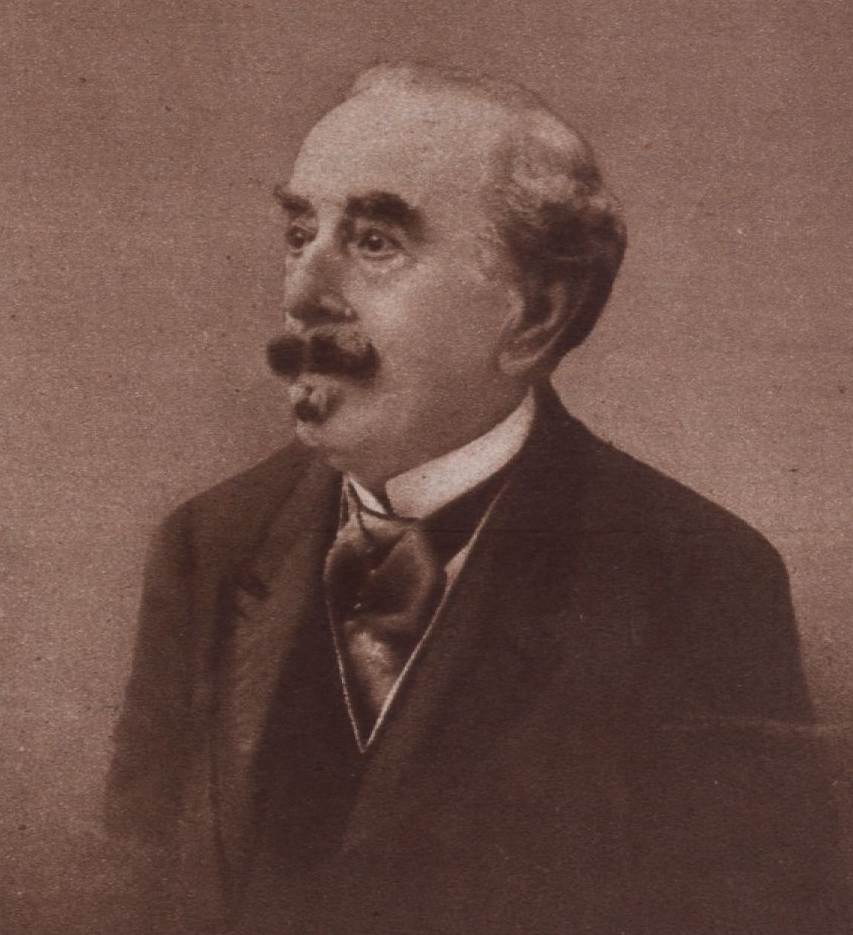

Carl (or Karl) Wilhelm Drescher (12 December 1850 – 8 December 1925) was an Austrian violinist and composer. In Vienna he founded and led a successful salon orchestra, which followed the tradition of the Strauss orchestra.

== Career ==
Drescher was born in Vienna, son of Johann Wilhelm Drescher, a painter, and his wife Anna. As a boy he was in the chorus of the Vienna Court Opera; he later studied singing and violin at the Vienna Conservatory. Aged 16 he was a first violin with the orchestra of Philipp Fahrbach Sr., and from 1868 he played in the Strauss orchestra.

From 1869 to 1872 he did military service; afterwards he returned to the Strauss orchestra. Later he was a first violinist in the salon orchestra of Carl Margold, which played classical music and dance music. Drescher was in the orchestra of the Ringtheater at its opening in 1874.

From September 1874, he led his own salon orchestra, Capelle Amusement, which followed the tradition of the Strauss orchestra. It became very popular, playing in many venues in Vienna, and also playing in Baden-Baden, Berlin and London. In 1900 Drescher was awarded the Salvatormedaille.

He retired in 1920, but made a last appearance in 1925 as conductor at the celebration of 40 years since the composition of the "Fiakerlied", a popular Viennese song. Drescher died in 1925, and was buried at the Vienna Central Cemetery.

Drescher wrote Viennese songs, marches and polkas.
