= Patrick Wittich =

German footballer (born 1983)

Personal information
- Date of birth: July 3, 1983 (age 43)
- Place of birth: Kaiserslautern, Germany
- Height: 1.84 m (6 ft 0 in)
- Position: Midfielder

Youth career
- SV Wiesenthalerhof
- 1. FC Kaiserslautern

Senior career*
Years	Team	Apps	(Gls)
2001–2004	1. FC Kaiserslautern II	55	(2)
2003–2005	1. FC Kaiserslautern	1	(0)
2005–2006	SV Wehen	0	(0)
2007	SC Hauenstein	3	(0)
2007–2008	TuS Altleiningen		
2008	ASV Sembach		

Managerial career
- 2018: SV Morlautern
- 2018–2020: SV Morlautern (youth)
- 2020–: TSV Landsberg (youth)
- * Club domestic league appearances and goals

Patrick Wittich (born 3 July 1982) is a German former professional footballer who played as a midfielder. He spent two seasons in the Bundesliga for 1. FC Kaiserslautern.

== Coaching career ==
In July 2020, Wittich was appointed head coach of TSV Landsberg's under-15 team.
