= Stefan Blank =

German footballer

Personal information
- Date of birth: 10 March 1977 (age 49)
- Place of birth: Gelsenkirchen, West Germany
- Height: 1.90 m (6 ft 3 in)
- Position: Left-back

Youth career
- 1984–1994: Schalke 04
- 1994–1996: SG Wattenscheid 09

Senior career*
Years	Team	Apps	(Gls)
1996–1998	SG Wattenscheid 09	14	(0)
1998–2000	Hannover 96	45	(10)
2000–2001	VfB Stuttgart	7	(0)
2001–2003	Werder Bremen II	3	(0)
2001–2003	Werder Bremen	1	(0)
2003	FC St. Pauli	12	(2)
2003–2005	Alemannia Aachen	43	(0)
2005–2006	1. FC Kaiserslautern	31	(5)
2006–2008	MSV Duisburg	6	(1)
Total		162	(18)

International career
1998–1999	Germany U-21	9	(2)
1998	Germany Olympic	4	(0)

Managerial career
- 2009: SG Wattenscheid 09 U19
- 2009–2010: SG Wattenscheid 09
- 2010–2011: SpVgg Erkenschwick
- 2013–2014: Hallescher FC II
- 2015: Eintracht Datteln
- 2015–2016: FC Kray
- * Club domestic league appearances and goals

Stefan Blank (born 10 March 1977) is a German former professional footballer who played as a left-back.

== Coaching career ==
After his retirement he was named as head coach of the SG Wattenscheid 09 U-19 and for the 2009–10 season also as head coach of SG Wattenscheid 09 but resigned in late December 2009.

== Honours ==
VfB Stuttgart

- UEFA Intertoto Cup: 2000
