= Halil Altıntop =

Turkish football player & coach (born 1982)

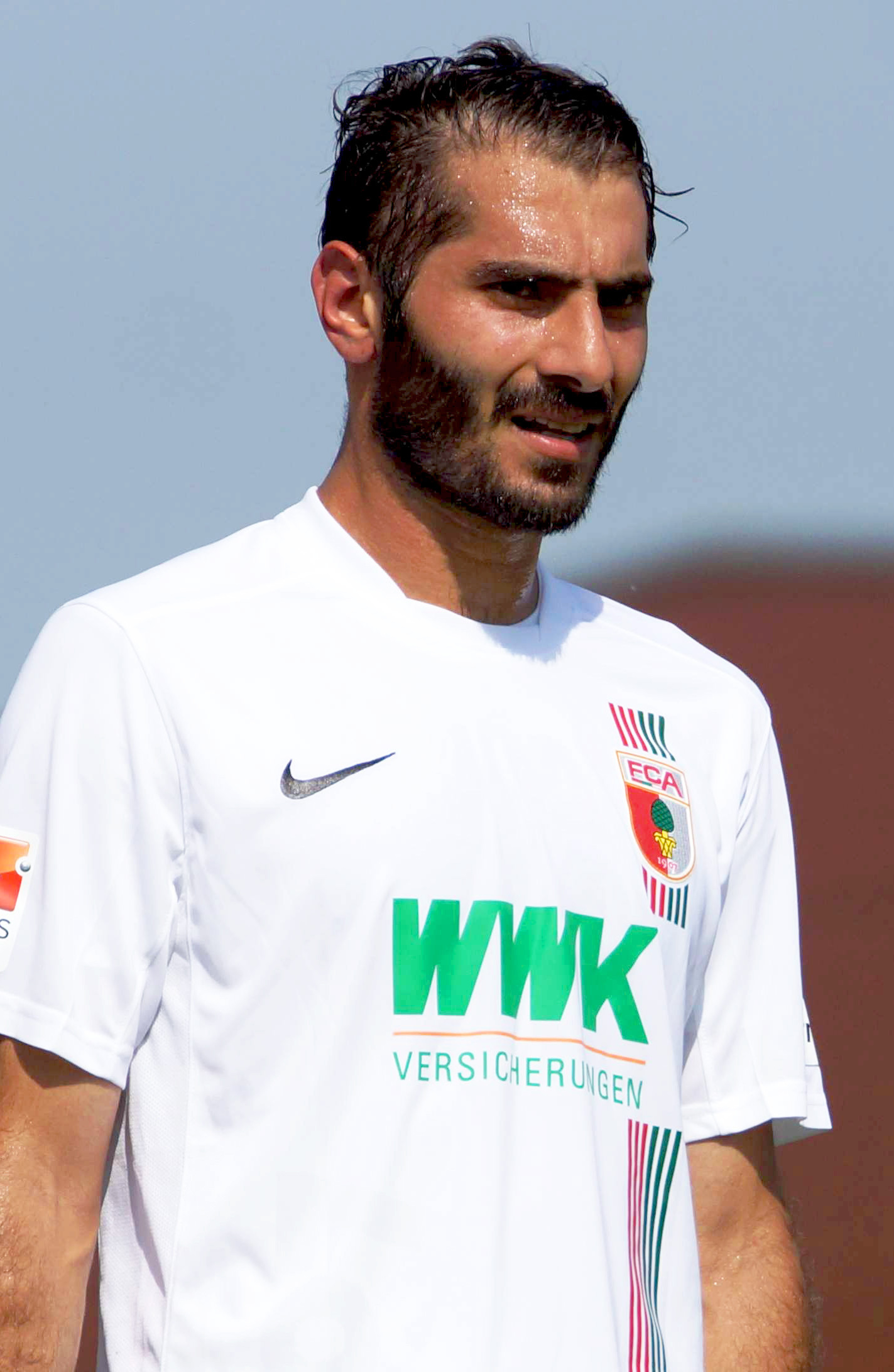
- Altıntop with FC Augsburg in 2015

Personal information
- Full name: Halil Altıntop
- Date of birth: 8 December 1982 (age 43)
- Place of birth: Gelsenkirchen, West Germany
- Height: 1.85 m (6 ft 1 in)
- Positions: Attacking midfielder; forward

Team information
- Current team: FC Bayern Campus (sporting director)

Youth career
- 1991–1992: Schwarz-Weiß Gelsenkirchen-Süd
- 1992–1997: TuS Rotthausen
- 1997–2000: Wattenscheid 09

Senior career*
Years	Team	Apps	(Gls)
2000–2003	Wattenscheid 09	81	(38)
2003–2004	1. FC Kaiserslautern II	3	(4)
2003–2006	1. FC Kaiserslautern	91	(28)
2006–2010	Schalke 04	96	(16)
2010–2011	Eintracht Frankfurt	49	(3)
2011–2013	Trabzonspor	61	(13)
2013–2017	FC Augsburg	115	(20)
2017–2018	Slavia Prague	8	(1)
2018	1. FC Kaiserslautern	14	(1)
Total		518	(124)

International career
2000	Turkey U18	2	(0)
2001	Turkey U20	1	(0)
2003	Turkey U21	9	(1)
2004	Turkey A2	1	(0)
2005–2011	Turkey	38	(8)

Managerial career
- 2018–2019: VfB Stuttgart (coach)
- 2019–2020: TSV Schwaben Augsburg
- 2020–2021: Bayern Munich U16 (assistant)
- 2021–2022: Bayern Munich U17
- 2022–2023: Bayern Munich (trainer scout)
- 2023–2024: FC Bayern Campus (sporting director)
- * Club domestic league appearances and goals

Halil Altıntop (Turkish pronunciation: [haˈlil aɫˈtɯntop]; born 8 December 1982) is a Turkish former professional footballer. During his playing days, he was deployed as an attacking midfielder, centre-forward, or winger. Halil is the identical twin brother of Hamit Altıntop.

== Career ==
Altıntop started his professional career in the local German club Wattenscheid 09 along with his brother. As successful performances grabbed the attention of bigger clubs, Altıntop was transferred to 1. FC Kaiserslautern, and his brother to Schalke 04. Altıntop, who played as a striker, finished third highest scorer in the Bundesliga for the 2005–06 season with 20 goals. At the end of that season he joined his brother at Schalke 04 on a free transfer. However, after only one season, his brother Hamit Altıntop joined Bayern Munich on another free deal. On 27 January 2010, he terminated his contract with Schalke 04 and joined Eintracht Frankfurt.

After Eintracht Frankfurt were relegated in the 2010–11 season, Altıntop was transferred to Turkish side Trabzonspor signing a three-year contract.

Altıntop joined FC Augsburg in summer 2013. He finished the 2016–17 season with 6 goals and 2 assists in 31 matches. At the end of the season he announced his decision not to renew his contract with club. In this time at Augsburg, he made 116 appearances in the Bundesliga scoring 20 goals and contributing 12 assists.

In June 2017, Altıntop moved to SK Slavia Prague of the Czech First League.

On 31 January 2018, Altintop returned to 1. FC Kaiserslautern on a year-and-a-half contract until 2019. However, in June 2018, he terminated his contract with the club and announced his retirement.

== Post-retirement ==
Altıntop joined Markus Weinzierl's coaching staff at VfB Stuttgart in late 2018. He left the position in April 2019 along with Weinzierl's team. In September of the same year, he was appointed head coach of TSV Schwaben Augsburg.

By July 2020, Altıntop became an assistant coach for Bayern Munich U16 team, and the following season, he was appointed as head coach of the U17 team. He later transitioned to a role as a trainer scout for Bayern Munich. In March 2023, Altıntop was appointed as the sporting director of the FC Bayern Campus. Altıntop resigned from his post at Bayern Munich on 31 July 2024.

== Career statistics ==
=== Club ===
As of 3 July 2018.

Appearances and goals by club, season and competition
Club	Season	League			Cup		Europe		Total	
Club	Season	Division	Apps	Goals	Apps	Goals	Apps	Goals	Apps	Goals
Wattenscheid 09	2000–01	Regionalliga	14	5	—		—		14	5
Wattenscheid 09	2001–02	Regionalliga	34	14	—		—		34	14
Wattenscheid 09	2002–03	Regionalliga	33	16	—		—		33	16
Wattenscheid 09	Total		81	35	—		—		81	35
1. FC Kaiserslautern	2003–04	Bundesliga	27	2	1	0	1	0	29	2
1. FC Kaiserslautern	2004–05	Bundesliga	30	6	1	0	—		31	6
1. FC Kaiserslautern	2005–06	Bundesliga	34	20	2	1	—		36	21
1. FC Kaiserslautern	Total		91	28	4	1	1	0	96	29
Schalke 04	2006–07	Bundesliga	34	6	2	1	2	0	38	7
Schalke 04	2007–08	Bundesliga	25	6	2	0	7	0	34	6
Schalke 04	2008–09	Bundesliga	31	4	4	1	8	2	43	7
Schalke 04	2009–10	Bundesliga	6	0	3	1	—		9	1
Schalke 04	Total		96	16	11	3	17	2	124	21
Eintracht Frankfurt	2009–10	Bundesliga	15	3	—		—		15	3
Eintracht Frankfurt	2010–11	Bundesliga	34	0	3	2	—		37	2
Eintracht Frankfurt	Total		49	3	3	2	—		52	5
Trabzonspor	2011–12	Süper Lig	34	6	1	0	3	0	38	6
Trabzonspor	2012–13	Süper Lig	27	7	10	2	9	1	46	10
Trabzonspor	Total		61	13	11	2	12	1	84	16
FC Augsburg	2013–14	Bundesliga	34	10	3	1	—		37	11
FC Augsburg	2014–15	Bundesliga	31	3	1	0	—		32	3
FC Augsburg	2015–16	Bundesliga	19	1	2	0	5	1	26	2
FC Augsburg	2016–17	Bundesliga	31	6	2	0	—		33	6
FC Augsburg	Total		115	20	8	1	5	1	128	22
Slavia Praha	2017–18	Czech First League	8	1	2	1	0	0	10	2
1. FC Kaiserslautern	2017–18	2. Bundesliga	14	1	0	0	—		14	1
Career total			515	117	39	10	35	4	589	131

=== International goals ===
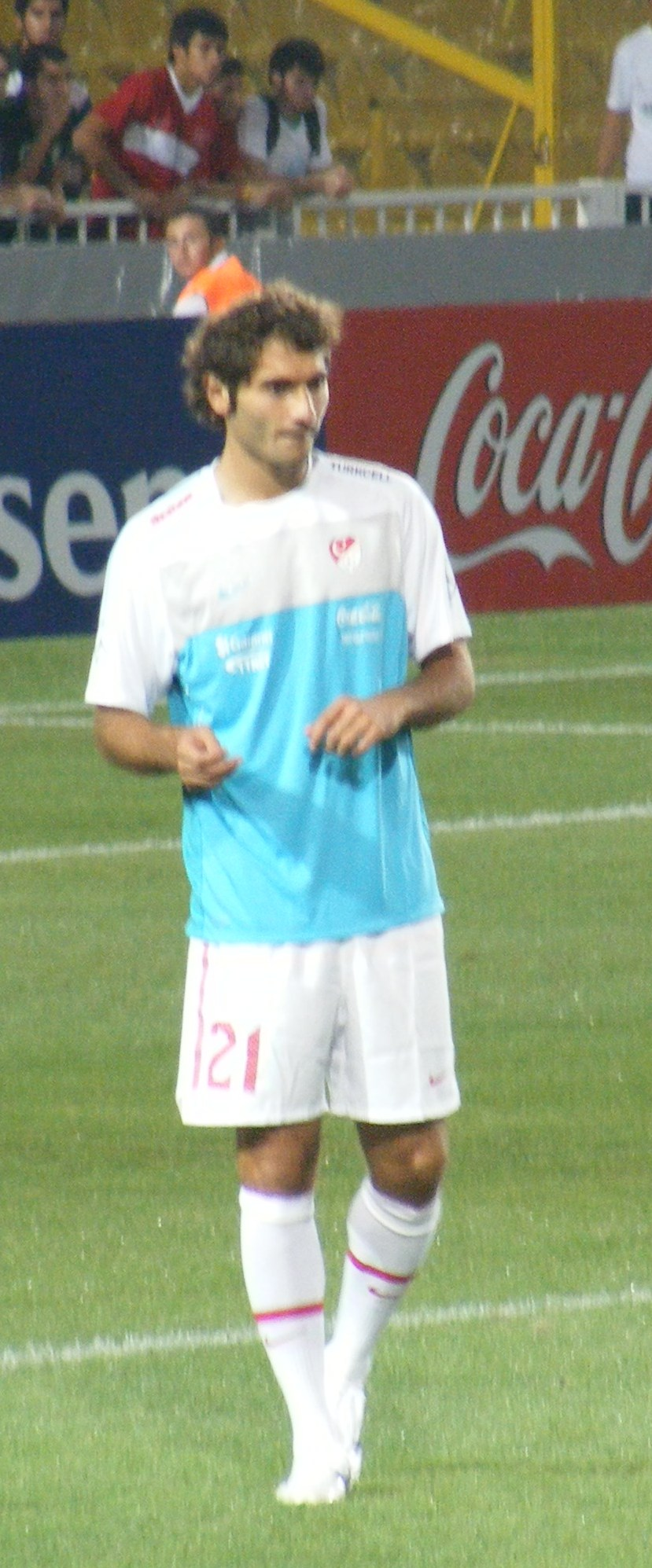
Altıntop playing for the Turkey national team, 2010

#	Date	Venue	Opponent	Score	Result	Competition
1.	8 June 2005	Almaty, Kazakhstan	Kazakhstan	6–0	6–0	2006 FIFA World Cup qualifying
2.	8 October 2005	Istanbul, Turkey	Germany	1–0	2–1	Friendly
3.	2 June 2006	Sittard, Netherlands	Angola	3–2	3–2	Friendly
4.	8 September 2007	Valletta, Malta	Malta	1–1	2–2	UEFA Euro 2008 qualifying
5.	12 September 2007	Istanbul, Turkey	Hungary	3–0	3–0	UEFA Euro 2008 qualifying
6.	20 August 2008	İzmit, Turkey	Chile	1–0	1–0	Friendly
7.	2 June 2009	Kayseri, Turkey	Azerbaijan	1–0	2–0	Friendly
8.	14 October 2009	Bursa, Turkey	Armenia	1–0	2–0	2010 FIFA World Cup qualification
Correct as of 14 October 2009.

=== Managerial statistics ===
As of 30 June 2020

Team	From	To	Record				
Team	From	To	G	W	D	L	Win %
TSV Schwaben Augsburg	17 September 2019	30 June 2020	11	3	4	4	27.27
Total			11	3	4	4	27.27
