= Thomas Drescher =

German former footballer

Personal information
- Date of birth: 24 November 1978 (age 47)
- Place of birth: Bad Nauheim, West Germany
- Height: 1.78 m (5 ft 10 in)
- Position: Defender

Youth career
- FV Okarben
- Rot-Weiss Frankfurt

Senior career*
Years	Team	Apps	(Gls)
–2001	KSV Klein-Karben		
2001–2004	1. FC Kaiserslautern	18	(1)
2004–2007	SV Wacker Burghausen	64	(3)
2008–2010	SV Elversberg	26	(0)
2010–2012	Eintracht Trier	61	(2)
2012–2014	1. FC Eschborn	18	(1)
- * Club domestic league appearances and goals

Thomas Drescher (born 24 November 1978 in Bad Nauheim) is a German former footballer who last played for 1. FC Eschborn. He spent two seasons in the Bundesliga with 1. FC Kaiserslautern.
