= Christoph Werner =

German footballer

Personal information
- Full name: Christoph Werner
- Date of birth: 26 June 1986 (age 40)
- Place of birth: Leipheim, Germany
- Height: 1.71 m (5 ft 7 in)
- Position: Striker

Team information
- Current team: KSV Aulendiebach

Youth career
- 1995–2002: Sportfreunde Oberau
- 2002–2005: Eintracht Frankfurt

Senior career*
Years	Team	Apps	(Gls)
2005–2006	Sportfreunde Oberau		
2006	SV 1919 Bernbach	20	(11)
2007–2009	1. FC Kaiserslautern II	43	(2)
2007	1. FC Kaiserslautern	1	(0)
2009–2010	FC Bayern Alzenau	12	(0)
2010–2013	TSV Grebenhain		
2013–2014	Viktoria Nidda	7	(1)
2014–2015	SG Meilingen	16	(4)
2015–2017	Sportfreunde Oberau	49	(21)
2017–	KSV Aulendiebach	59	(8)

Managerial career
- 2017–: KSV Aulendiebach
- * Club domestic league appearances and goals as of 27 January 2021

Christoph Werner (born 26 June 1986) is a German footballer who plays for KSV Aulendiebach.

== Career ==
Until January 2007 Werner played for the amateur clubs SF Oberau and SV 1919 Bernbach. For Bernbach he scored 11 times in the first 20 games of the 2006/2007 Oberliga season. This was the reason for several professional clubs all over Germany asking to give him a contract. At the end he went to the 2. Bundesliga member 1. FC Kaiserslautern. Although starting with a good feeling he could not convince in Kaiserslautern. In his first season, he only played one time for the first team (against Erzgebirge Aue on 2 March 2007. This was his first and last professional game until now. Usually he is part of the 4th league squad of the U23 of FCK. Also there he could not show his talent, only scoring two times in 23 games.
