= Torsten Reuter =

German footballer

Personal information
- Date of birth: 15 September 1982 (age 44)
- Place of birth: Kaiserslautern, West Germany
- Height: 1.76 m (5 ft 9 in)
- Position: Midfielder

Youth career
- VfR Kaiserslautern
- –2000: 1. FC Kaiserslautern

Senior career*
Years	Team	Apps	(Gls)
2000–2006	1. FC Kaiserslautern II	79	(3)
2001–2006	1. FC Kaiserslautern	22	(0)
2004–2005	→ 1. FC Saarbrücken (loan)	22	(3)
2006–2007	1. FC Saarbrücken	9	(0)
2007	SV Wehen Wiesbaden	14	(1)
2007–2011	1. FC Kaiserslautern II	86	(6)
2011–2012	TuS Hohenecken	19	(3)
- * Club domestic league appearances and goals as of 30 June 2012

Torsten Reuter (born 15 September 1982 in Kaiserslautern) is a German footballer who appeared in the Bundesliga for 1. FC Kaiserslautern.

== Career ==
Reuter made his professional league debut in the Bundesliga for 1. FC Kaiserslautern on 10 August 2002, when he started a game against VfB Stuttgart.

== Honours ==
- DFB-Pokal finalist: 2002–03
