= Michael Lehmann (footballer) =

German footballer

Personal information
- Date of birth: 16 October 1984 (age 42)
- Place of birth: Kaiserslautern, West Germany
- Height: 1.78 m (5 ft 10 in)
- Position: Midfielder

Youth career
- SV Wiesenthalerhof
- 1992–2003: 1. FC Kaiserslautern

Senior career*
Years	Team	Apps	(Gls)
2003–2007	1. FC Kaiserslautern	14	(0)
2007–2008	FC Wil	29	(0)
2008–2010	SV Elversberg	36	(0)
2010–2015	SC Idar-Oberstein	136	(7)
- * Club domestic league appearances and goals

Michael Lehmann (born 16 October 1984 in Kaiserslautern) is a German former footballer. He spent three seasons in the Bundesliga with 1. FC Kaiserslautern.
