= Sebastian Reinert =

German footballer

Bastian Reinert
Personal information
- Full name: Sebastian Reinert
- Date of birth: 20 April 1987 (age 39)
- Place of birth: St. Wendel, West Germany
- Height: 1.72 m (5 ft 8 in)
- Position: Midfielder

Team information
- Current team: SF Bundenthal

Youth career
- 1992–1996: FC Gronig
- 1996–2005: 1. FC Kaiserslautern

Senior career*
Years	Team	Apps	(Gls)
2005–2009	1. FC Kaiserslautern II	67	(5)
2006–2009	1. FC Kaiserslautern	42	(7)
2009–2010	Wehen Wiesbaden	35	(6)
2010	Wehen Wiesbaden II	1	(0)
2010–2011	Sportfreunde Lotte	16	(1)
2011–2018	FK Pirmasens	123	(11)
2018–2020	SG Scheuern/Steinbach	22	(7)
2020–	SF Bundenthal	4	(0)

International career
2006	Germany U-20	2	(0)
2008	Germany U-21	1	(0)

Managerial career
- 2018–2020: SG Scheuern/Steinbach
- 2020–: SF Bundenthal
- * Club domestic league appearances and goals

Sebastian Reinert (born 20 April 1987) is a German footballer who plays as a midfielder for SF Bundenthal.

== Career ==
Born in St. Wendel, Reinert played for the local FC Gronig before he transferred to Kaiserslautern's "E-Youth" team in 1996. Since then, he has played 67 matches and scored five goals in both the 1. and 2. Bundesliga. He announced his transfer to SV Wehen on 21 May 2009 and joined his new club on 1 July 2009. On 6 December 2010, he signed with Sportfreunde Lotte of the Regionalliga West, but was released at the end of the season and signed for FK Pirmasens.

== International career ==
Reinert was capped twice for Germany U-20 and once game for the Germany U-21 team.
