= 2008–09 Hertha BSC season =

Hertha BSC
2008–09 season
- President: Werner Gegenbauer
- Manager: Lucien Favre
- Bundesliga: 4th
- DFB-Pokal: Second round
- UEFA Cup: Group stage
- Top goalscorer: League: Andriy Voronin (11 goals); All: Marko Pantelić (14 goals)
- Highest home attendance: 74,422 (v. Schalke 04)
- Lowest home attendance: 700 (v. Nistru Otaci)
Home colours	Away colours	Third colours

The 2008–09 season of Hertha BSC began on 17 July 2008 with a UEFA Cup first qualifying round match against Nistru Otaci of Moldova and ended on 23 May 2009, the final matchday of the Bundesliga, with a match against Karlsruher SC. Hertha were eliminated in the second round of the DFB-Pokal and in the group stage of the UEFA Cup. They finished fourth in the Bundesliga, qualifying for the UEFA Europa League.

== Players ==
=== First-team squad ===
Squad at end of season

Note: Flags indicate national team as defined under FIFA eligibility rules; some limited exceptions apply. Players may hold more than one non-FIFA nationality.

No.	Pos.	Nation	Player
1	GK	CZE	Jaroslav Drobný
2	DF	BRA	Kaká
3	DF	GER	Arne Friedrich (captain)
4	DF	SUI	Steve von Bergen
5	DF	GER	Sofian Chahed (Note: Chahed was born in West Berlin, West Germany (now Berlin, Germany), and represented Germany at U-19 and U-20 level, but also qualified to represent Tunisia internationally and made his debut for Tunisia in October 2009.)
6	MF	CRO	Marko Babić
7	MF	BRA	Cícero
8	MF	HUN	Pál Dárdai
9	FW	SRB	Marko Pantelić
10	FW	BRA	Raffael
11	FW	UKR	Andriy Voronin (on loan from Liverpool)
12	GK	GER	Christian Fiedler
13	DF	GER	Marc Stein
14	DF	CRO	Josip Šimunić (Note: Šimunić was born in Canberra, Australia, but also qualified to represent Croatia and Bosnia and Herzegovina internationally through his parents and made his international debut for Croatia in November 2001.)
15	DF	BRA	Rodnei
16	MF	BRA	Lúcio

No.	Pos.	Nation	Player
17	MF	USA	Bryan Arguez
20	MF	GER	Patrick Ebert
22	DF	ARG	Leandro Cufré (on loan from Monaco)
23	FW	BUL	Valeri Domovchiyski
25	MF	ROU	Maximilian Nicu (Note: Nicu was born in Prien am Chiemsee, West Germany (now Germany), but also qualified to represent Romania internationally through his parents and made his international debut for Romania in April 2009.)
26	MF	POL	Łukasz Piszczek
27	FW	TUN	Amine Chermiti
28	MF	SUI	Fabian Lustenberger
29	MF	GER	Sascha Bigalke
30	GK	GER	Christopher Gäng
35	DF	GER	Shervin Radjabali-Fardi
36	MF	GER	Lennart Hartmann
38	MF	FRA	Ibrahima Traoré (Note: Traoré was born in Villepinte, France, but also qualified to represent Guinea internationally and made his international debut for Guinea in August 2010.)
39	MF	GER	Florian Riedel
40	GK	GER	Sascha Burchert
44	MF	SRB	Gojko Kačar

== Transfers ==
=== Summer ===
In: Note: Flags indicate national team as defined under FIFA eligibility rules; some limited exceptions apply. Players may hold more than one non-FIFA nationality.

No.	Pos.	Nation	Player
2	DF	BRA	Kaka (from Académica de Coimbra)
7	MF	BRA	Cícero (on loan from Tombense)
11	FW	UKR	Andriy Voronin (on loan from Liverpool)
13	DF	GER	Marc Stein (from Hansa Rostock)
15	DF	BRA	Rodnei (from CA Juventus, previously on loan to Jagiellonia Białystok)
23	FW	BUL	Valeri Domovchiyski (from Levski Sofia, previously on loan)
25	MF	ROU	Maximilian Nicu (from Wehen Wiesbaden)
27	FW	TUN	Amine Chermiti (from Étoile Sportive du Sahel)
29	MF	GER	Sascha Bigalke (from Hertha BSC II)
35	DF	GER	Shervin Radjabali-Fardi (from Hertha BSC Youth)
36	MF	GER	Lennart Hartmann (from Hertha BSC Youth)
39	MF	GER	Florian Riedel (from Hertha BSC Youth)

Out: Note: Flags indicate national team as defined under FIFA eligibility rules; some limited exceptions apply. Players may hold more than one non-FIFA nationality.

No.	Pos.	Nation	Player
6	MF	CZE	Rudolf Skácel (loan return to Southampton)
7	MF	BRA	Mineiro (to Chelsea)
18	FW	CRO	Srđan Lakić (to 1. FC Kaiserslautern, previously on loan to Heracles Almelo)
19	DF	GER	Andreas Schmidt (retired)
21	FW	NGR	Solomon Okoronkwo (to Saturn Moscow Oblast)
22	MF	SWE	Tobias Grahn (loan return to Gimnàstic de Tarragona)
24	MF	TUR	Bilal Çubukçu (Note: Çubukçu was born in Berlin, Germany, but also qualified to represent Turkey internationally and represented Turkey at U-21 level.) (to Gençlerbirliği)
27	DF	GER	Amadeus Wallschläger (to Carl Zeiss Jena)
33	FW	BRA	André Lima (on loan to São Paulo)
36	DF	GER	Pascal Bieler (to 1. FC Nürnberg)
39	FW	GER	Chinedu Ede (to MSV Duisburg)
—	DF	DEN	Dennis Cagara (Note: Cagara was born in Glostrup, Denmark, and represented Denmark at U-16, U-17, U-18, U-19, U-20, and U-21 level, but also qualified to represent the Philippines internationally through his father and made his international debut for the Philippines in October 2011.) (to Nordsjælland, previously on loan)

=== Winter ===
In: Note: Flags indicate national team as defined under FIFA eligibility rules; some limited exceptions apply. Players may hold more than one non-FIFA nationality.

No.	Pos.	Nation	Player
6	DF	CRO	Marko Babić (from Real Betis)
22	DF	ARG	Leandro Cufré (on loan from Monaco)

Out: Note: Flags indicate national team as defined under FIFA eligibility rules; some limited exceptions apply. Players may hold more than one non-FIFA nationality.

No.	Pos.	Nation	Player

== Statistics ==
=== Goalscorers ===
Player	Bundesliga	DFB-Pokal	UEFA Cup qualification	UEFA Cup	Total
(Serbia) Marko Pantelić	7	2	4	1	14
(Ukraine) Andriy Voronin	11	0	0	0	11
(Brazil) Raffael	6	0	2	0	8
(Brazil) Cícero	7	0	0	1	8
(Serbia) Gojko Kačar	6	0	0	0	6
(Germany) Patrick Ebert	3	1	1	0	5
(Bulgaria) Valeri Domovchiyski	3	0	0	0	3
(Romania) Maximilian Nicu	2	0	0	1	3
(Poland) Łukasz Piszczek	0	0	3	0	3
(Switzerland) Fabian Lustenberger	1	1	0	0	2
(Hungary) Pál Dárdai	1	0	0	0	1
(Croatia) Josip Šimunić	1	0	0	0	1
(Germany) Marc Stein	0	0	1	0	1

=== International appearances ===
Player	Position	Country	Caps (Goals)	Caps this season
Josip Šimunić	DF	Croatia	70 (3)	vs. Kazakhstan, vs. England, vs. Ukraine, vs. Andorra, vs. Romania, vs. Ukraine
Arne Friedrich	DF	Germany	66 (0)	vs. Russia, vs. Wales, vs. England, vs. China, vs. (United Arab Emirates) UAE
Andriy Voronin	FW	Ukraine	61 (6)	vs. Poland, vs. Belarus, vs. Kazakhstan, vs. Serbia, vs. England, vs. Kazakhstan
Pál Dárdai	MF	Hungary	55 (5)	vs. Denmark, vs. Sweden, vs. Albania, vs. Malta
Marko Pantelić	FW	Serbia	22 (5)	vs. Faroe Islands, vs. France, vs. Lithuania, vs. Austria, vs. Sweden, vs. Austria, vs. Faroe Islands
Amine Chermiti	FW	Tunisia	13 (3)	vs. Burkina Faso, vs. Burundi, vs. Netherlands
Gojko Kačar	MF	Serbia	6 (0)	vs. France, vs. Bulgaria, vs. Austria, vs. Faroe Islands
Jaroslav Drobný	GK	Czech Republic	1 (0)	vs. Morocco
Maximilian Nicu	MF	Romania	1 (0)	vs. Austria

== Results ==
=== UEFA Cup ===
==== First qualifying round ====
17 July 2008 First leg	Hertha BSC	8–1	(Moldova) Nistru Otaci	Friedrich-Ludwig-Jahn-Sportpark, Berlin
20:15 CET	Pantelić 15', 36'; Raffael 23', 71'; Piszczek 33', 42', 80'; Stein 68'	Report	Tcaciuc 78'	Attendance: 13,343; Referee: Richard Liesveld (Netherlands)

31 July 2008 Second leg	(Moldova) Nistru Otaci	0–0	Hertha BSC	Zimbru Stadium, Chișinău
18:00 CEST		Report		Attendance: 700; Referee: Anders Hermansen (Denmark)

==== Second qualifying round ====
14 August 2008 First leg	(Slovenia) Interblock Ljubljana	0–2	Hertha BSC	Arena Petrol, Ljubljana
20:45 CEST		Report	Pantelić 16', 81'	Attendance: 2,000; Referee: Fredy Fautrel (France)

28 August 2008 Second leg	Hertha BSC	1–0	(Slovenia) Interblock Ljubljana	Friedrich-Ludwig-Jahn-Sportpark, Berlin
18:30 CEST	Ebert 3'	Report		Attendance: 11,849; Referee: Bruno Paixão (Portugal)

==== First round ====
16 September 2008 First leg	Hertha BSC	2–0	(Republic of Ireland) St. Patrick's Athletic	Olympiastadion, Berlin
18:00 CEST	Nicu 50'; Cícero 76'	Report		Attendance: 13,045; Referee: Tomasz Mikulski (Poland)

30 September 2008 Second leg	(Republic of Ireland) St. Patrick's Athletic	0–0	Hertha BSC	RDS Arena, Dublin
18:00 CET		Report		Attendance: 5,000; Referee: Michail Koukoukalis (Greece)

==== Group stage ====
23 October 2008 1	Hertha BSC	1–1	(Portugal) Benfica	Olympiastadion, Berlin
20:30 CEST	Pantelić 74'	Report	Di María 51'	Attendance: 22,144; Referee: Paul Allaerts (Belgium)

6 November 2008 2	(Ukraine) Metalist Kharkiv	0–0	Hertha BSC	Metalist Stadium, Kharkiv
18:00 CET		Report		Attendance: 40,000; Referee: Björn Kuipers (Netherlands)

3 December 2008 3	Hertha BSC	0–1	(Turkey) Galatasaray	Olympiastadion, Berlin
20:45 CET		Report	Baroš 69' (pen.)	Attendance: 62,612; Referee: Nicola Rizzoli (Italy)

18 December 2008 4	(Greece) Olympiacos	4–0	Hertha BSC	Karaiskakis Stadium, Piraeus
20:45 CET	Dudu 54'; Galletti 68' (pen.); Torosidis 86'; Diogo 89'	Report		Attendance: 33,000; Referee: Martin Hansson (Sweden)

=== DFB-Pokal ===
8 August 2008 2	Eintracht Trier	1–3	Hertha BSC	Moselstadion, Trier
20:30 CEST	Lacroix 26'	Report	Pantelić 8'; Lustenberger 60'; Ebert 81'	Attendance: 5,830; Referee: Guido Winkmann (Kerken)

24 September 2008 2	Borussia Dortmund	2–1 (a.e.t.)	Hertha BSC	Signal Iduna Park, Dortmund
19:00 CEST	Frei 7' (pen.); Klimowicz 104'	Report	Pantelić 22'	Attendance: 30,012; Referee: Michael Weiner (Giesen)

=== Bundesliga ===
17 August 2008 1	Eintracht Frankfurt	0–2	Hertha BSC	Commerzbank Arena, Frankfurt
17:00 CEST		Report	Raffael 43'; Ebert 60'	Attendance: 44,900; Referee: Florian Meyer (Burgdorf)

23 August 2008 2	Hertha BSC	1–1	Arminia Bielefeld	Olympiastadion, Berlin
15:30 CEST	Pantelić 32'	Report	Wichniarek 37'	Attendance: 36,302; Referee: Markus Schmidt (Stuttgart)

31 August 2008 3	Bayern Munich	4–1	Hertha BSC	Allianz Arena, Munich
17:00 CEST	Toni 12'; Lahm 54'; Schweinsteiger 56' (pen.); Klose 70' (pen.)	Report	Pantelić 84'	Attendance: 69,000; Referee: Michael Kempter (Sauldorf)

13 September 2008 4	Hertha BSC	2–2	VfL Wolfsburg	Olympiastadion, Berlin
15:30 CEST	Kačar 54'; Cícero 85'	Report	Costa 1'; Riether 90'	Attendance: 38,921; Referee: Wolfgang Stark (Ergolding)

20 September 2008 5	Borussia Mönchengladbach	0–1	Hertha BSC	Borussia Park, Mönchengladbach
15:30 CEST		Report	Kačar 11'	Attendance: 43,193; Referee: Felix Brych (Munich)

27 September 2008 6	Hertha BSC	0–1	Energie Cottbus	Olympiastadion, Berlin
14:30 CET		Report	Jelić 13'	Attendance: 42,297; Referee: Deniz Aytikin (Oberasbach)

4 October 2008 7	Bayer Leverkusen	0–1	Hertha BSC	BayArena, Leverkusen
15:30 CEST		Report	Voronin 89'	Attendance: 22,500; Referee: Knut Kircher (Rottenburg)

18 October 2008 8	Hertha BSC	2–1	VfB Stuttgart	Olympiastadion, Berlin
16:30 CET	Nicu 29'; Kačar 87'	Report	Cacau 51'	Attendance: 42,336; Referee: Peter Sippel (Munich)

26 October 2008 9	Borussia Dortmund	1–1	Hertha BSC	Signal Iduna Park, Dortmund
17:00 CET	Kehl 71'	Report	Cícero 31' (pen.)	Attendance: 65,000; Referee: Florian Meyer (Burgdorf)

29 October 2008 10	Hertha BSC	3–0	Hannover 96	Olympiastadion, Berlin
20:00 CET	Pantelić 63'; Voronin 84'; Domovchiyski 90+1'	Report		Attendance: 31,329; Referee: Felix Brych (Munich)

1 November 2008 11	Werder Bremen	5–1	Hertha BSC	Weserstadion, Bremen
15:30 CET	Kačar 14' (o.g.); Diego 20'; Rosenberg 42'; Pizarro 60', 85'	Report	Cícero 68'	Attendance: 40,218; Referee: Marc Seemann (Essen)

9 November 2008 12	Hertha BSC	1–0	1899 Hoffenheim	Olympiastadion, Berlin
17:00 CET	Voronin 70'	Report		Attendance: 58,862; Referee: Herbert Fandel (Kyllburg)

15 November 2008 13	Hertha BSC	2–1	Hamburger SV	Olympiastadion, Berlin
15:30 CET	Cícero 46'; Domovchiyski 49'	Report	Petrić 12'	Attendance: 48,425; Referee: Thorsten Kinhöfer (Herne)

22 November 2008 14	VfL Bochum	2–3	Hertha BSC	Ruhrstadion, Bochum
15:30 CET	Šesták 50'; Mięciel 74'		Raffael 25'; Kačar 33'; Cícero 39'	Attendance: 25,000; Referee: Michael Weiner (Giesen)

28 November 2008 15	Hertha BSC	2–1	1. FC Köln	Olympiastadion, Berlin
20:30 CET	Kačar 24'; Pantelić 86'	Report	Novaković 45'	Attendance: 40,704; Referee: Lutz Wagner (Kriftel)

6 December 2008 16	Schalke 04	1–0	Hertha BSC	Veltins-Arena, Gelsenkirchen
15:30 CET	Asamoah 65'	Report		Attendance: 60,999; Referee: Michael Kempter (Sauldorf)

13 December 2008 17	Hertha BSC	4–0	Karlsruher SC	Olympiastadion, Berlin
15:30 CET	Nicu 8'; Domovchiyski 74'; Lustenberger 86'; Raffael 88'	Report		Attendance: 38,421; Referee: Babak Rafati (Hanover)

31 January 2009 18	Hertha BSC	2–1	Eintracht Frankfurt	Olympiastadion, Berlin
15:30 CET	Pantelić 17', 51'	Report	Köhler 53'	Attendance: 39,847; Referee: Thorsten Kinhöfer (Herne)

6 February 2009 19	Arminia Bielefeld	1–1	Hertha BSC	Schüco-Arena, Bielefeld
20:30 CET	Wichniarek 40'	Report	Voronin 13'	Attendance: 20,700; Referee: Michael Weiner (Giesen)

14 February 2009 20	Hertha BSC	2–1	Bayern Munich	Olympiastadion, Berlin
15:30 CET	Voronin 38', 77'	Report	Klose 61'	Attendance: 74,220; Referee: Florian Meyer (Burgdorf)

21 February 2009 21	VfL Wolfsburg	2–1	Hertha BSC	Volkswagen Arena, Wolfsburg
15:30 CET	Džeko 71', 84'	Report	Cícero 62'	Attendance: 29,300; Referee: Knut Kircher (Rottenburg)

28 February 2009 22	Hertha BSC	2–1	Borussia Mönchengladbach	Olympiastadion, Berlin
15:30 CET	Voronin 28'; Dárdai 44'	Report	Bradley 69' (pen.)	Attendance: 48,534; Referee: Peter Gagelmann (Bremen)

7 March 2009 23	Energie Cottbus	1–3	Hertha BSC	Stadion der Freundschaft, Cottbus
15:30 CET	Atan 21'	Report	Voronin 34', 45', 88'	Attendance: 22,528; Referee: Helmut Fleischer (Sigmertshausen)

14 March 2009 24	Hertha BSC	1–0	Bayer Leverkusen	Olympiastadion, Berlin
15:30 CET	Voronin 50'	Report		Attendance: 58,735; Referee: Babak Rafati (Hanover)

21 March 2009 25	VfB Stuttgart	2–0	Hertha BSC	Mercedes-Benz Arena, Stuttgart
15:30 CET	Cacau 47'; Khedira 51'	Report		Attendance: 50,000; Referee: Thorsten Kinhöfer (Herne)

4 April 2009 26	Hertha BSC	1–3	Borussia Dortmund	Olympiastadion, Berlin
15:30 CEST	Raffael 54'	Report	Frei 25'; Kehl 63'; Valdez 82'	Attendance: 74,000; Referee: Michael Weiner (Giesen)

11 April 2009 27	Hannover 96	2–0	Hertha BSC	AWD-Arena, Hanover
15:30 CEST	Hanke 29'; Bruggink 62'	Report		Attendance: 47,187; Referee: Michael Kempter (Sauldorf)

18 April 2009 28	Hertha BSC	2–1	Werder Bremen	Olympiastadion, Berlin
15:30 CEST	Šimunić 71'; Raffael 87'	Report	Mertesacker 43'	Attendance: 60,000; Referee: Babak Rafati (Hanover)

25 April 2009 29	1899 Hoffenheim	0–1	Hertha BSC	Rhein-Neckar-Arena, Sinsheim
15:30 CEST		Report	Ebert 41'	Attendance: 30,150; Referee: Wolfgang Stark (Ergolding)

2 May 2009 30	Hamburger SV	1–1	Hertha BSC	HSH Nordbank Arena, Hamburg
15:30 CEST	Jansen 8'	Report	Kačar 66'	Attendance: 57,000; Referee: Thorsten Kinhöfer (Herne)

9 May 2009 31	Hertha BSC	2–0	VfL Bochum	Olympiastadion, Berlin
15:30 CEST	Pantelić 39'; Raffael 50'	Report		Attendance: 71,323; Referee: Helmut Fleischer (Sigmertshausen)

12 May 2009 32	1. FC Köln	1–2	Hertha BSC	RheinEnergieStadion, Cologne
20:00 CEST	Chihi 90'	Report	Cícero 42'; Ebert 53'	Attendance: 48,000; Referee: Knut Kircher (Rottenburg)

16 May 2009 33	Hertha BSC	0–0	Schalke 04	Olympiastadion, Berlin
15:30 CEST		Report		Attendance: 74,244; Referee: Peter Gagelmann (Bremen)

23 May 2009 34	Karlsruher SC	4–0	Hertha BSC	Wildparkstadion, Karlsruhe
15:30 CET	Freis 33'; Franz 40'; Kennedy 62', 72'	Report		Attendance: 3,600; Referee: Michael Weiner (Giesen)
