= 2007–08 Hertha BSC season =

Hertha BSC
2007–08 season
- President: Werner Gegenbauer
- Manager: Lucien Favre
- Bundesliga: 10th
- DFB-Pokal: Second round
- Top goalscorer: League: Marko Pantelić (13 goals); All: Marko Pantelić (14 goals)
- Highest home attendance: 74,220 vs. Bayern Munich
- Lowest home attendance: 5,000 vs. Unterhaching
Home colours	Away colours	Third colours

Hertha BSC's 2007–08 season began on 4 August 2007, with their DFB-Pokal match against Unterhaching, and ended 17 May 2008, with their Bundesliga match against Bayern Munich. They finished tenth in the Bundesliga and were eliminated in the second round of the DFB-Pokal.

== Players ==
=== First-team squad ===
Squad at end of season

Note: Flags indicate national team as defined under FIFA eligibility rules; some limited exceptions apply. Players may hold more than one non-FIFA nationality.

No.	Pos.	Nation	Player
1	GK	CZE	Jaroslav Drobný
3	DF	GER	Arne Friedrich (captain)
4	DF	SUI	Steve von Bergen
5	DF	GER	Sofian Chahed (Note: Chahed was born in West Berlin, West Germany (now Berlin, Germany), and represented Germany at U-19 and U-20 level, but also qualified to represent Tunisia internationally and made his debut for Tunisia in October 2009.)
6	MF	CZE	Rudi Skácel (on loan from Southampton)
7	MF	BRA	Mineiro
8	MF	HUN	Pál Dárdai
9	FW	SRB	Marko Pantelić
10	FW	BRA	Raffael
12	GK	GER	Christian Fiedler
14	DF	CRO	Josip Šimunić (Note: Šimunić was born in Canberra, Australia, but also qualified to represent Croatia and Bosnia and Herzegovina internationally through his parents and made his international debut for Croatia in November 2001.)
16	MF	BRA	Lúcio
17	MF	USA	Bryan Arguez
19	DF	GER	Andreas Schmidt
20	MF	GER	Patrick Ebert
21	FW	NGR	Solomon Okoronkwo

No.	Pos.	Nation	Player
22	MF	SWE	Tobias Grahn (on loan from Gimnàstic de Tarragona)
23	FW	BUL	Valeri Domovchiyski (on loan from Levski Sofia)
24	MF	TUR	Bilal Çubukçu (Note: Çubukçu was born in Berlin, Germany, but also qualified to represent Turkey internationally and represented Turkey at U-21 level.)
26	FW	POL	Łukasz Piszczek
27	DF	GER	Amadeus Wallschläger
28	MF	SUI	Fabian Lustenberger
29	MF	GER	Sascha Bigalke
30	GK	GER	Christopher Gäng
33	FW	BRA	André Lima
34	MF	GER	Marcus Steinwarth
36	DF	GER	Pascal Bieler
38	MF	FRA	Ibrahima Traoré (Note: Traoré was born in Villepinte, France, but also qualified to represent Guinea internationally and made his international debut for Guinea in August 2010.)
39	MF	GER	Chinedu Ede
40	GK	GER	Sascha Burchert
44	MF	SRB	Gojko Kačar

== Transfers ==
=== Summer ===
In: Note: Flags indicate national team as defined under FIFA eligibility rules; some limited exceptions apply. Players may hold more than one non-FIFA nationality.

No.	Pos.	Nation	Player
1	GK	CZE	Jaroslav Drobný (from Bochum)
5	DF	SUI	Steve von Bergen (from Zürich)
16	MF	BRA	Lúcio (from Palmeiras)
21	FW	NGR	Solomon Okoronkwo (loan return from RW Essen)
22	MF	SWE	Tobias Grahn (on loan from Gimnàstic de Tarragona)
24	MF	TUR	Bilal Çubukçu (from Hertha BSC II)
26	FW	POL	Łukasz Piszczek (loan return from Zaglebie Lubin)
28	MF	SUI	Fabian Lustenberger (from Lucerne)
30	GK	GER	Christopher Gäng (from Waldhof Mannheim)
33	FW	BRA	André Lima (from Botafogo)
36	DF	GER	Pascal Bieler (loan return from Rot-Weiss Essen)
38	MF	FRA	Ibrahima Traoré (from Hertha BSC II)
40	GK	GER	Sascha Burchert (from Hertha BSC Youth)
13	FW	ARG	Christian Giménez (from Marseille; previously on loan)

Out: Note: Flags indicate national team as defined under FIFA eligibility rules; some limited exceptions apply. Players may hold more than one non-FIFA nationality.

No.	Pos.	Nation	Player
4	DF	NED	Dick van Burik (retired)
7	MF	TUR	Yıldıray Baştürk (Note: Baştürk was born in Herne, West Germany (now Germany), but also qualified to represent Turkey internationally and made his debut for Turkey in 1998.) (to Stuttgart)
11	FW	NED	Ellery Cairo (to Coventry City)
13	FW	ARG	Christian Giménez (to Deportivo Toluca)
16	MF	GER	Ashkan Dejagah (Note: Dejagah was born in Tehran, Iran, but was raised in Germany from the age of 1 and represented Germany at U-17, U-18, U-19, U-20 and U-21 level before making his international debut for Iran in February 2012.) (to Wolfsburg)
17	MF	GER	Kevin-Prince Boateng (Note: Boateng was born in West Berlin, West Germany (now Berlin, Germany), and represented Germany at U-19, U-20 and U-21 level, but also qualified to represent Ghana internationally through his father and made his international debut for Ghana in June 2010.) (to Tottenham Hotspur)
18	FW	CRO	Srđan Lakić (on loan to Heracles Almelo)
20	MF	GER	Andreas Neuendorf (to Ingolstadt 04)
23	DF	DEN	Dennis Cagara (Note: Cagara was born in Glostrup, Denmark, and represented Denmark at U-16, U-17, U-18, U-19, U-20, and U-21 level, but also qualified to represent the Philippines internationally through his father and made his international debut for the Philippines in October 2011.) (on loan to Nordsjælland)
32	DF	GER	Robert Müller (to Carl Zeiss Jena)
33	GK	DEN	Kevin Stuhr Ellegaard (to Randers)
40	GK	GER	Nico Pellatz (to Werder Bremen)
43	DF	GER	Christopher Storch (to Real Madrid B)
41	DF	GER	Jérôme Boateng (to Hamburger SV)

=== Winter ===
In: Note: Flags indicate national team as defined under FIFA eligibility rules; some limited exceptions apply. Players may hold more than one non-FIFA nationality.

No.	Pos.	Nation	Player
6	MF	CZE	Rudolf Skácel (on loan from Southampton)
10	FW	BRA	Raffael (from FC Zürich)
17	MF	USA	Bryan Arguez (from D.C. United)
23	FW	BUL	Valeri Domovchiyski (on loan from Levski Sofia)
44	MF	SRB	Gojko Kačar (from Vojvodina)

Out: Note: Flags indicate national team as defined under FIFA eligibility rules; some limited exceptions apply. Players may hold more than one non-FIFA nationality.

No.	Pos.	Nation	Player
37	DF	GER	Christian Müller (to Energie Cottbus)
6	DF	BRA	Gilberto (to Tottenham Hotspur)
29	DF	GER	Malik Fathi (to Spartak Moscow)

== Statistics ==
=== Goalscorers ===
Player	Bundesliga	DFB-Pokal	Total
(Serbia) Marko Pantelić	13	1	14
(Germany) Sofian Chahed	4	0	4
(Brazil) Raffael	4	0	4
(Nigeria) Solomon Okoronkwo	4	0	4
(Czech Republic) Rudolf Skácel	2	0	2
(Brazil) André Lima	2	0	2
(Germany) Patrick Ebert	1	1	2
(Germany) Malik Fathi	1	1	2
(Brazil) Mineiro	1	0	1
(Brazil) Lúcio	1	0	1
(Poland) Łukasz Piszczek	1	0	1
(Switzerland) Fabian Lustenberger	1	0	1
(Serbia) Gojko Kačar	1	0	1
(Bulgaria) Valeri Domovchiyski	1	0	1

== Fixtures ==
=== DFB-Pokal ===
==== First round ====
4 August 2007	SpVgg Unterhaching	0–3	Hertha BSC	Generali Sportpark, Unterhaching
15:30 CET	Leichleiter (penalty missed)	Report	Fathi 44'; Ebert 65'; Pantelić 80'	Attendance: 5,000; Referee: Knut Kircher (Hirschau)

==== Second round ====
30 October 2007	Wuppertaler Borussia	2–0	Hertha BSC	Zoo-Stadion, Wuppertal
19:00 CET	Lintjens 81'; Jerat 86'	Report		Attendance: 12,399; Referee: Christian Dingert (Lichtenberg)

=== Bundesliga ===
11 August 2007 1	Eintracht Frankfurt	1–0	Hertha BSC	Commerzbank Arena, Frankfurt
15:30 CET	Amanatidis 31'	Report		Attendance: 45,900; Referee: Michael Weiner (Ottenstein)

18 August 2007 2	Hertha BSC	3–1	VfB Stuttgart	Olympiastadion, Berlin
15:30 CET	Chahed 51' (pen.); Fathi 65'; Okoronkwo 80'	Report	Hitzlsperger 15'	Attendance: 46,743; Referee: Thorsten Kinhöfer (Constantin)

25 August 2007 3	Arminia Bielefeld	2–0	Hertha BSC	Schüco Arena, Bielefeld
15:30 CET	Masmanidis 52'; Wichniarek 90'	Report		Attendance: 20,000; Referee: Wolfgang Stark (Altdorf)

1 September 2007 4	Hertha BSC	2–1	VfL Wolfsburg	Olympiastadion, Berlin
15:30 CET	Pantelić 38'; Okoronkwo 88'	Report	Dejagah 61'	Attendance: 42,079; Referee: Jochen Drees (Münster)

16 September 2007 5	MSV Duisburg	1–2	Hertha BSC	MSV Arena, Duisburg
18:00 CET	Lavrić 78'	Report	Pantelić 61', 70'	Attendance: 25,070; Referee: Helmut Fleischer (Hallstadt)

22 September 2007 6	Hertha BSC	3–2	Borussia Dortmund	Olympiastadion, Berlin
15:30 CET	Pantelić 43', 54'; Okoronkwo 76'	Report	Petrić 31', 88'	Attendance: 52,237; Referee: Michael Kempter (Sauldorf)

25 September 2007 7	Hertha BSC	1–3	Hansa Rostock	Olympiastadion, Berlin
20:00 CET	Pantelić 2'	Report	Rahn 40'; Hähnge 54'; Dorn 74'	Attendance: 48,670; Referee: Babak Rafati(Döhren)

28 September 2007 8	Schalke 04	1–0	Hertha BSC	Arena AufSchalke, Gelsenkirchen
20:30 CET	Rafinha 44' (pen.)	Report		Attendance: 60,511; Referee: Felix Brych (Munich)

6 October 2007 9	Hertha BSC	0–0	Energie Cottbus	Olympiastadion, Berlin
15:30 CET		Report		Attendance: 48,715; Referee: Markus Schmidt (Sillenbuch)

20 October 2007 10	Werder Bremen	3–2	Hertha BSC	Weserstadion, Bremen
15:30 CET	Almeida 57'; Rosengerg 62'; Andreasen 74'	Report	Gilberto 61'; Okonronkwo 90'	Attendance: 40,280; Referee: Günter Perl (Munich)

27 October 2007 11	Hertha BSC	2–0	VfL Bochum	Olympiastadion, Berlin
15:30 CET	Maltritz 26' (o.g.); Pantelić 35'	Report		Attendance: 34,580; Referee: Wolfgang Stark (Altdorf)

3 November 2007 12	Hamburger SV	2–1	Hertha BSC	HSH Nordbank Arena, Hamburg
15:30 CET	Guerrero 4'; Reinhardt 80'	Report	Ebert 59'	Attendance: 56,493; Referee: Markus Merk (Kaiserslautern)

10 November 2007 13	Hertha BSC	1–0	Hannover 96	Olympiastadion, Berlin
15:30 CET	André Lima 87'	Report		Attendance: 34,213; Referee: Felix Brych (Munich)

23 November 2007 14	Karlsruher SC	2–1	Hertha BSC	Wildparkstadion, Karlsruhe
20:30 CET	Hajnal 56'; Freis 66'	Report	Pantelić 35'	Attendance: 29,217; Referee: Michael Weiner (Ottenstein)

1 December 2007 15	Hertha BSC	0–3	Bayer Leverkusen	Olympiastadion, Berlin
15:30 CET		Report	Ramelow 31'; Barnetta 50'; Barbarez 90'	Attendance: 40,527; Referee: Thorsten Kinhöfer (Constantin)

9 December 2007 16	1. FC Nürnberg	2–1	Hertha BSC	Easycredit-Stadion, Nuremberg
17:00 CET	Misimović 5'; Charisteas 39'	Report	Lustenberger 65'	Attendance: 41,490; Referee: Florian Meyer (Braunschweig)

15 December 2007 17	Hertha BSC	0–0	Bayern Munich	Olympiastadion, Berlin
15:30 CET		Report		Attendance: 74,220; Referee: Markus Merk (Kaiserslautern)

2 February 2008 18	Hertha BSC	0–3	Eintracht Frankfurt	Olympiastadion, Berlin
15:30 CET		Report	Fenin 39', 60', 90'	Attendance: 35,930; Referee: Peter Gagelmann (Bremen)

9 February 2008 19	VfB Stuttgart	1–3	Hertha BSC	Gottlieb-Daimler-Stadion, Stuttgart
15:30 CET	Gómez 40'	Report	Pantelić 7', 45'; Raffael 49'	Attendance: 48,000; Referee: Herbert Fandel (Utscheid)

16 February 2008 20	Hertha BSC	1–0	Arminia Bielefeld	Olympiastadion, Berlin
15:30 CET	Raffael 90+3'	Report		Attendance: 32,031; Referee: Günter Perl (Munich)

23 February 2008 21	VfL Wolfsburg	0–0	Hertha BSC	Volkswagen Arena, Wolfsburg
15:30 CET		Report		Attendance: 23,659; Referee: Thorsten Kinhöfer (Constantin)

29 February 2008 22	Hertha BSC	2–0	MSV Duisburg	Olympiastadion, Berlin
20:30 CET	Raffael 34'; Pantelić 36'	Report		Attendance: 32,382; Referee: Felix Brych (Munich)

7 March 2008 23	Borussia Dortmund	1–1	Hertha BSC	Signal Iduna Park, Dortmund
20:30 CET	Kehl 45'	Report	Pantelić 50'	Attendance: 71,000; Referee: Babak Rafati (Döhren)

15 March 2008 24	Hansa Rostock	0–0	Hertha BSC	DKB-Arena, Rostock
15:30 CET		Report		Referee: Peter Gagelmann (Bremen)

23 March 2008 25	Hertha BSC	1–2	Schalke 04	Olympiastadion, Berlin
17:00 CET	Chahed 67' (pen.)	Report	Asamoah 12'; Jones 23'	Attendance: 54,200; Referee: Helmut Fleisher (Hallstadt)

30 March 2008 26	Energie Cottbus	2–1	Hertha BSC	Stadion der Freundschaft, Cottbus
17:00 CET	Skela 41', 63' (pen.)	Report	Mineiro 21'	Attendance: 20,746; Referee: Markus Merk (Kaiserslautern)

5 April 2008 27	Hertha BSC	1–2	Werder Bremen	Olympiastadion, Berlin
15:30 CET	André Lima 10'	Report	Rosenberg 1'; Borowski 73'	Attendance: 59,728; Referee: Florian Meyer (Braunschweig)

12 April 2008 28	VfL Bochum	1–1	Hertha BSC	rewirpowerSTADION, Bochum
15:30 CET	Yahia 42'	Report	Skácel 28'	Attendance: 20,883; Referee: Felix Brych (Munich)

15 April 2008 29	Hertha BSC	0–0	Hamburger SV	Olympiastadion, Berlin
20:00 CET		Report		Attendance: 40,289; Referee: Peter Sippel (Würzburg)

26 April 2008 30	Hannover 96	2–2	Hertha BSC	AWD-Arena, Hannover
15:30 CET	Hanke 19'; Štajner 26'	Report	Chahed 55' (pen.); Piszczek 66'	Attendance: 41,473; Referee: Michael Kempter (Sauldorf)

3 May 2008 31	Hertha BSC	3–1	Karlsruher SC	Olympiastadion, Berlin
15:30 CET	Kačar 25'; Pantelić 31'; Skácel 86'	Report	Kapllani 53'	Attendance: 49,595; Referee: Michael Weiner (Ottenstein)

7 May 2008 32	Bayer Leverkusen	1–2	Hertha BSC	BayArena, Leverkusen
20:00 CET	Sinkiewicz 90'	Report	Pantelić 26'; Chahed 68' (pen.)	Attendance: 22,500; Referee: Thorstin Kinhöfer (Constantin)

10 May 2008 33	Hertha BSC	1–0	1. FC Nürnberg	Olympiastadion, Berlin
15:30 CET	Raffael 74'	Report		Attendance: 47,072; Referee: Babak Rafati (Döhren)

17 May 2008 34	Bayern Munich	4–1	Hertha BSC	Allianz Arena, Munich
15:30 CET	Toni 3', 27', 61'; Ribéry 33'	Report	Domovchiyski 84'	Attendance: 69,000; Referee: Markus Merk (Kaiserslautern)
