= Lúcio (footballer, born 1979) =

Brazilian footballer

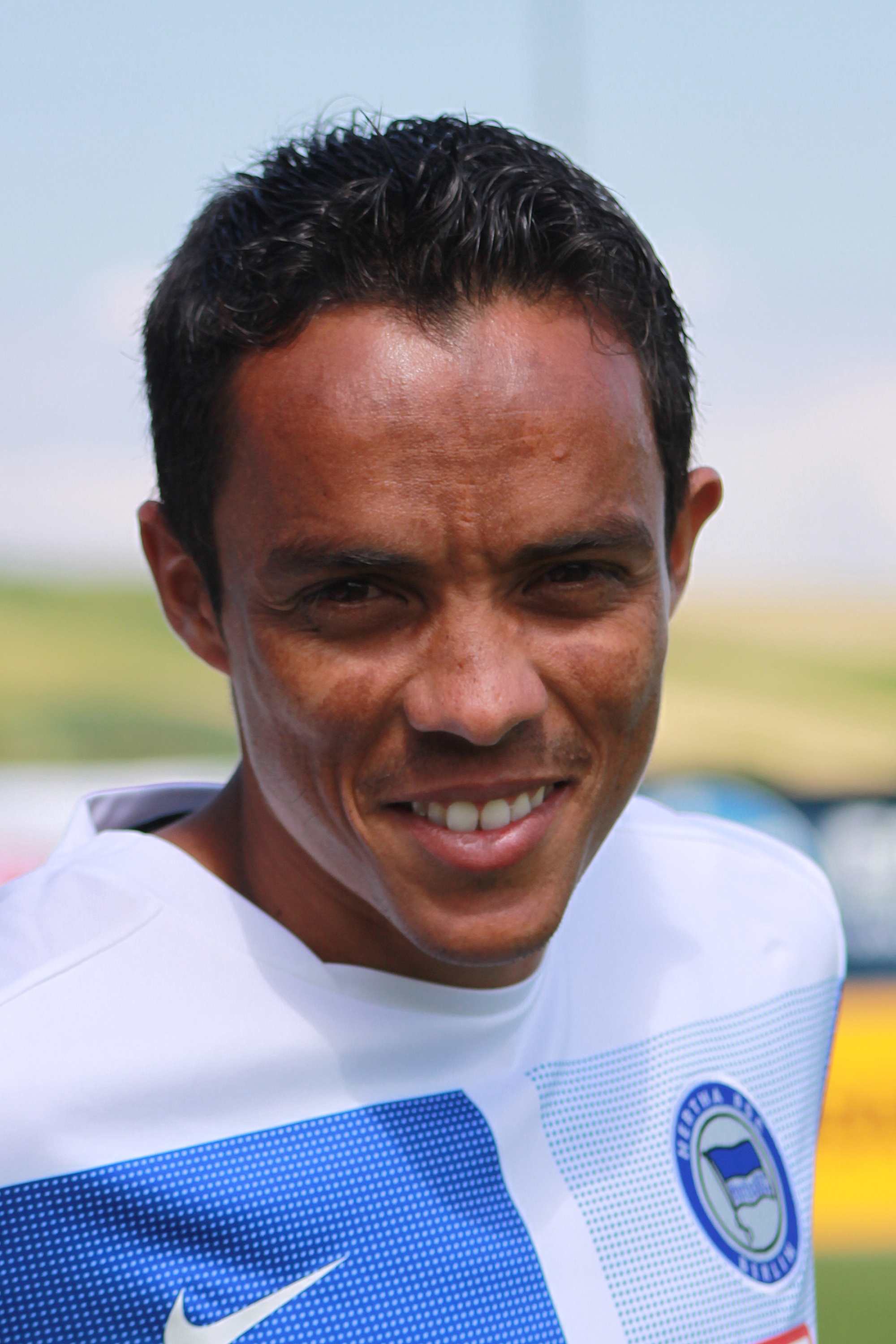
- Lúcio in 2009

Personal information
- Full name: Lúcio Carlos Cajueiro de Souza
- Date of birth: 20 June 1979 (age 47)
- Place of birth: Olinda, Pernambuco, Brazil
- Height: 1.76 m (5 ft 9 in)
- Positions: Left midfielder; left-back

Youth career
- 1997–1999: Unibol

Senior career*
Years	Team	Apps	(Gls)
2000–2001	São Bento	12	(2)
2001	Gama	15	(0)
2001	São Bento	10	(1)
2001–2002	XV de Piracicaba	6	(0)
2002–2003	Ituano	27	(3)
2003–2007	Palmeiras	58	(4)
2006	→ São Paulo (loan)	11	(0)
2007	→ Grêmio (loan)	6	(1)
2007–2010	Hertha BSC	10	(1)
2009–2010	→ Grêmio (loan)	14	(0)
2010–2011	Grêmio	35	(0)
2012	Náutico	23	(1)
2013	Fortaleza	3	(1)
2015	Salgueiro	0	(0)
2015	Santa Cruz	15	(0)
2016	Veranópolis	0	(0)
Total		245	(14)
- * Club domestic league appearances and goals

Lúcio Carlos Cajueiro Souza (born 20 June 1979), commonly known as Lúcio, is a Brazilian former professional footballer.

== Career ==
Lúcio was born in Olinda, Recife, Pernambuco. In his career he played for clubs like Unibol (1997–1999), São Bento, Gama and XV de Piracicaba (2000–2001), Ituano and São Caetano (2002), Palmeiras (2003–2006) and São Paulo (2006). In January 2007, he was signed by Bundesliga club Hertha BSC.

In September 2007, he suffered a knee injury which threatened to end his career. He was ruled him for the rest of the 2007–08 season, and most of the 2008–09 season. After almost a year and a half, he was finally able to play again, making a late appearance in Hertha's UEFA Cup match against Olympiacos. However, Lúcio was unable to reestablish himself in the team and on 18 August 2009, Hertha loaned him to Grêmio. In July 2010 he joined Grêmio on a free transfer.

== Honours ==
- São Paulo State Championship: 2002
- Rio Grande do Sul Championship: 2007
- Brazilian Championship: 2006
