= Raffael (footballer) =

Brazilian footballer

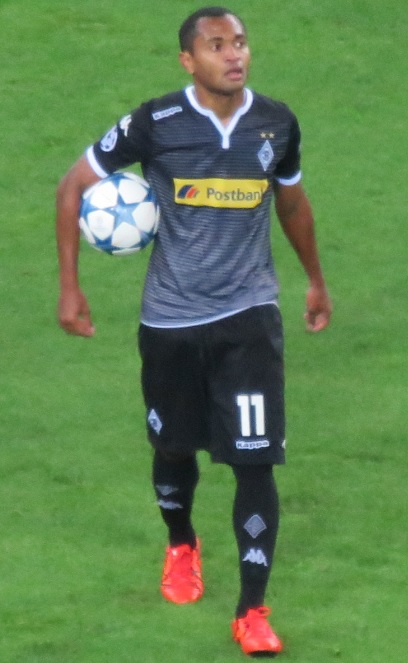
- Raffael with Mönchengladbach in 2015

Personal information
- Full name: Raffael Caetano de Araújo
- Date of birth: 28 March 1985 (age 41)
- Place of birth: Fortaleza, Brazil
- Height: 1.74 m (5 ft 9 in)
- Positions: Forward; attacking midfielder

Youth career
- Vitória

Senior career*
Years	Team	Apps	(Gls)
2001–2003	Juventus		
2003–2005	Chiasso	64	(30)
2005–2007	Zürich	105	(53)
2008–2012	Hertha	163	(39)
2012–2013	Dynamo Kyiv	13	(1)
2013	→ Schalke 04 (loan)	16	(2)
2013–2020	Borussia Mönchengladbach	199	(71)
2021–2022	Pohronie	3	(0)
2023–	Ay-Yildizspor		
- * Club domestic league appearances and goals as of 26 October 2023

Raffael Caetano de Araújo (born 28 March 1985), known as simply Raffael, is a Brazilian professional footballer who plays as a forward or attacking midfielder. He last played for Pohronie of the Fortuna Liga.

== Career ==
=== Early career in Switzerland ===
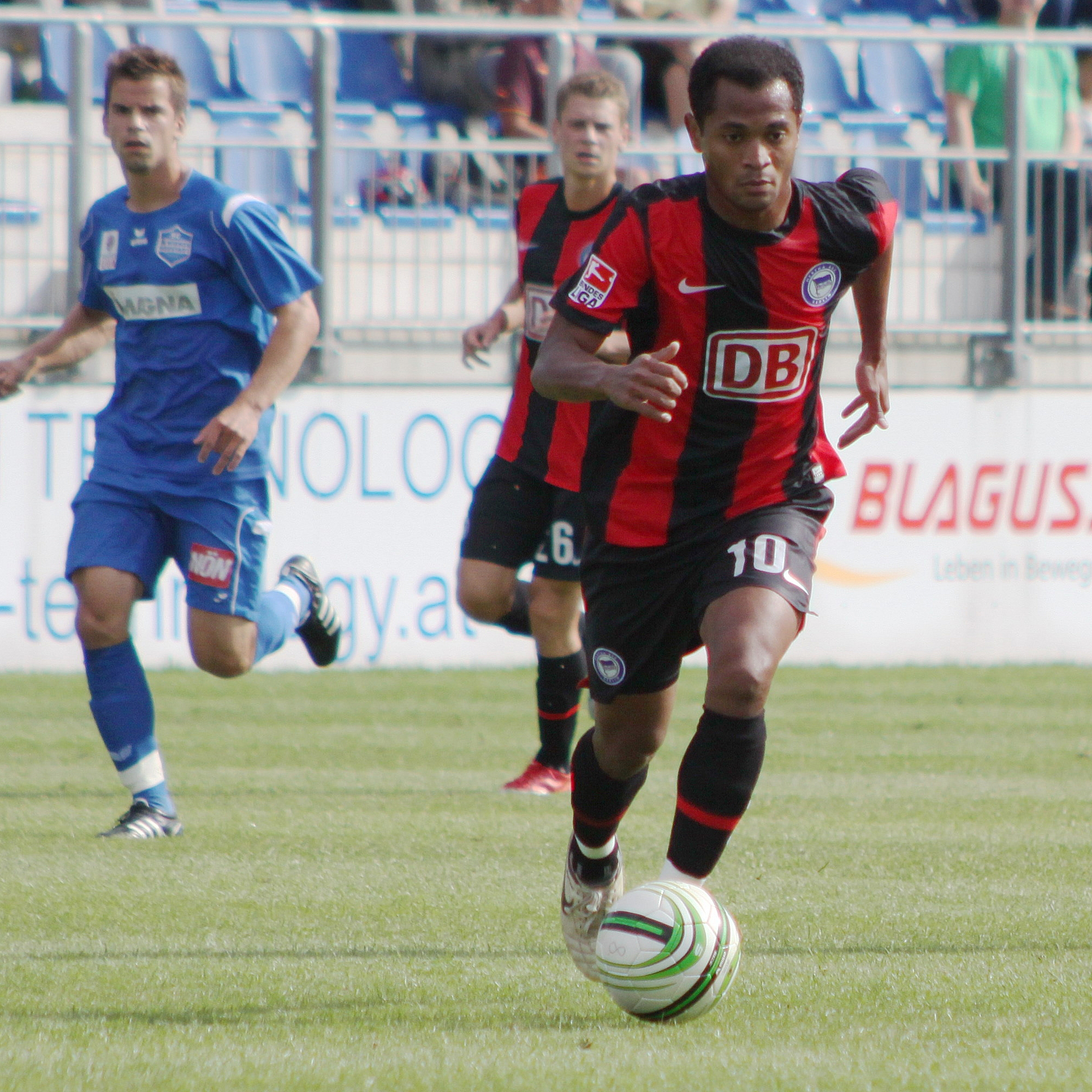
Raffael playing for Hertha BSC in 2009

Born in Fortaleza, Ceará, Raffael moved still in his teens to Switzerland, first representing lowly FC Chiasso. At age 20, he moved to FC Zürich, being instrumental in the club's 2005–06 and 2006–07 league conquests; during both seasons, he led the competition in assists, while also adding 40 goals during his two-and-a-half-year spell.

=== Hertha BSC ===
In mid-January 2008, Raffael signed with German outfit Hertha BSC, being reunited with former Zürich teammates Lucien Favre and Steve von Bergen (respectively manager and player). His first game in the Bundesliga was on 2 February, in a 0–3 home defeat against Eintracht Frankfurt; the following matchday, at VfB Stuttgart, he netted his first goal, as Hertha won it 3–1.

Making 140 appearances over four and a half years, Raffael experienced both the high and low points of the Berlin-based club's recent history, including a fourth-place finish 2008–09 season, in which Hertha lead the table for some time, and relegations in 2009–10 and 2011–12. On 27 July 2012, Raffael left the club to sign for Dynamo Kyiv.

=== Borussia Mönchengladbach ===
On 20 June 2013, he left Dynamo Kyiv to sign for Borussia Mönchengladbach. On 25 June 2020, the sports director of Borussia Mönchengladbach Max Eberl confirmed that the contract of Raffael would not be renewed.

=== FK Pohronie ===
On 19 October 2021, after over a year without club affiliation, Raffael signed with Pohronie of the Fortuna Liga, with the club last in the league rankings at the time of his arrival. Following his arrival in the Žiar nad Hronom-based club, Raffael had highlighted his desire to continue enjoying football and entertaining the fans, as well as aiding the struggling club. In return, Favre highlighted Raffael as a great asset to the team and the entire league. Raffael was however released after just three games during the winter break.

== Personal life ==
Raffael's younger brother, Ronny, is also a professional footballer. A midfielder, he represented most notably Hertha BSC, for whom he has played more than 100 games. From 2010 to 2012, the brothers played together for Hertha.

As of 2015, Raffael was studying to be a member of Jehova's Witnesses. In March 2020, Raffael and his family acquired German citizenship. He do lives in Jüchen, North Rhine-Westphalia.

== Career statistics ==
=== Club ===
As of 27 June 2020

Appearances and goals by club, season and competition
Club	Season	League			National Cup		Other		Europe		Total	
Club	Season	Division	Apps	Goals	Apps	Goals	Apps	Goals	Apps	Goals	Apps	Goals
FC Zürich	2005–06	Swiss Super League	31	14	5	5	—		4	3	40	22
FC Zürich	2006–07	Swiss Super League	31	13	5	3	—		2	0	38	16
FC Zürich	2007–08	Swiss Super League	15	12	4	2	—		8	1	27	15
FC Zürich	Total		77	39	14	10	0	0	14	4	105	53
Hertha BSC	2007–08	Bundesliga	15	4	0	0	—		—		15	4
Hertha BSC	2008–09	Bundesliga	33	6	2	0	—		8	2	43	8
Hertha BSC	2009–10	Bundesliga	31	7	2	2	—		7	1	40	10
Hertha BSC	2010–11	2. Bundesliga	30	10	1	0	—		—		31	10
Hertha BSC	2011–12	Bundesliga	31	6	1	0	2	1	—		34	7
Hertha BSC	Total		140	33	6	2	2	1	15	3	163	39
Dynamo Kyiv	2012–13	Ukrainian Premier League	9	1	1	0	—		3	0	13	1
Schalke 04 (loan)	2012–13	Bundesliga	16	2	0	0	—		0	0	16	2
Borussia Mönchengladbach	2013–14	Bundesliga	34	14	1	0	—		—		35	14
Borussia Mönchengladbach	2014–15	Bundesliga	31	12	2	0	—		9	2	42	14
Borussia Mönchengladbach	2015–16	Bundesliga	31	13	2	0	—		6	2	39	15
Borussia Mönchengladbach	2016–17	Bundesliga	20	7	2	1	—		9	5	31	13
Borussia Mönchengladbach	2017–18	Bundesliga	27	9	2	1	—		—		29	10
Borussia Mönchengladbach	2018–19	Bundesliga	13	2	1	3	—		—		14	5
Borussia Mönchengladbach	2019–20	Bundesliga	8	0	0	0	—		3	0	11	0
Borussia Mönchengladbach	Total		164	57	10	5	0	0	27	9	201	71
Career total			405	132	31	17	2	1	59	16	497	166

== Honours ==
FC Zürich

- Swiss Super League: 2005–06, 2006–07

Hertha BSC

- 2. Bundesliga: 2010–11
