= Bilal Çubukçu =

Turkish footballer (born 1987)

Personal information
- Date of birth: 16 May 1987 (age 39)
- Place of birth: Berlin, Germany
- Height: 1.76 m (5 ft 9 in)
- Position: Midfielder

Team information
- Current team: BSV Dersim 1993

Youth career
- Anadoluspor Berlin
- Rot-Weiß Neukölln
- –2002: Tennis Borussia Berlin
- 2002–2005: Hertha BSC

Senior career*
Years	Team	Apps	(Gls)
2005–2008	Hertha BSC	51	(12)
2008–2010	Gençlerbirliği	31	(2)
2011–2012	Alemannia Aachen	9	(0)
2012–2013	Adana Demirspor	3	(0)
2013	Tokatspor	15	(0)
2013–2014	Berliner AK 07	26	(2)
2014–2017	SV Babelsberg 03	91	(11)
2017–2019	BFC Dynamo	40	(4)
2019–2020	Hertha BSC II	16	(0)
2020–2021	Kocaelispor	3	(0)
2021	Ergene Velimeşe	3	(0)
2021–2022	CFC Hertha 06	4	(0)
2022–2023	Anadoluspor Berlin	10	(1)
2023–2024	BFC Meteor 06	19	(1)
2024–2025	Anadoluspor Berlin	5	(0)
2025–	BSV Dersim 1993	1	(0)

International career
2004	Turkey U17	9	(0)
2004	Turkey U18	6	(0)
2004–2006	Turkey U19	6	(0)
2005	Turkey U20	4	(0)
2008	Turkey U21	3	(0)
- * Club domestic league appearances and goals as of 14:05, 8 May 2026 (UTC)

Bilal Çubukçu (born 16 May 1987) is a Turkish footballer who plays as a midfielder for Bezirksliga Berlin club BSV Dersim 1993.

== Club career ==
=== Youth ===
Çubukçu grew up in Berlin-Kreuzberg. He played his first youth football at local clubs Anadoluspor Berlin and Rot-Weiß Neukölln. He then joined Tennis Borussia Berlin before moving to Hertha BSC's youth academy in 2002. There, he impressed with his performances that helped the team win the Under 17 Bundesliga in his debut season after a 4–1 win over VfB Stuttgart. The following year, Çubukçu won the U19 DFB-Pokal by beating SGV Freiberg 5–0 in the final in May 2004.

=== Professional ===
Çubukçu made his debut for Hertha BSC II in the 2005–06 Regionalliga season, making a total of five appearances. In the following season, he made 22 appearances. However, Hertha's second team were relegated at the end of the season. In 2007–08, Çubukçu helped his club to the league title with 12 goals and 11 assists, which earned him a place in the first team. He was initially allowed to practice there, but was not brought to training camp by coach Lucien Favre, after which he left the club for Turkey and signed a contract with Gençlerbirliği. After some strong initial performances, he became a reserve after a new coach was brought in, whereupon he terminated his contract by mutual consent with the club.

In January 2011, Çubukçu returned to Germany, signing a one-and-a-half-year contract with 2. Bundesliga club Alemannia Aachen. After his contract expired, he left the club. In the following season, he agreed a deal with Turkish second division club Adana Demirspor. He left the club again in the 2012 winter transfer window after his contract was terminated. For the second half of the 2012–13 season, he signed with Turkish third division club Tokatspor.

Afterwards, stints followed at lower league clubs in Germany. In the summer of 2016, Çubukçu wanted to leave SV Babelsberg 03 after two years and join Turkish third division club Bucaspor, but due to the politically uncertain situation, he changed his mind and renewed his contract with Babelsberg.

For the 2017–18 season, Çubukçu moved to Regionalliga club BFC Dynamo, where he was also immediately named captain. He stayed here for two seasons before returning to Hertha BSC II in July 2019. In September 2020, Çubukçu moved to İzmit to join local football club Kocaelispor.

=== Later career ===
In April 2021, Çubukçu signed with NOFV-Oberliga club CFC Hertha 06. After a year, he returned to childhood club Anadoluspor Berlin in the Bezirksliga. In 2023, he joined Landesliga Berlin 2 club BFC Meteor 06.

== International career ==
Çubukçu progressed through the youth teams from Turkey U17 to Turkey U21, playing a total of 28 games.
