= Lucien Favre =

Swiss footballer and coach (born 1957)

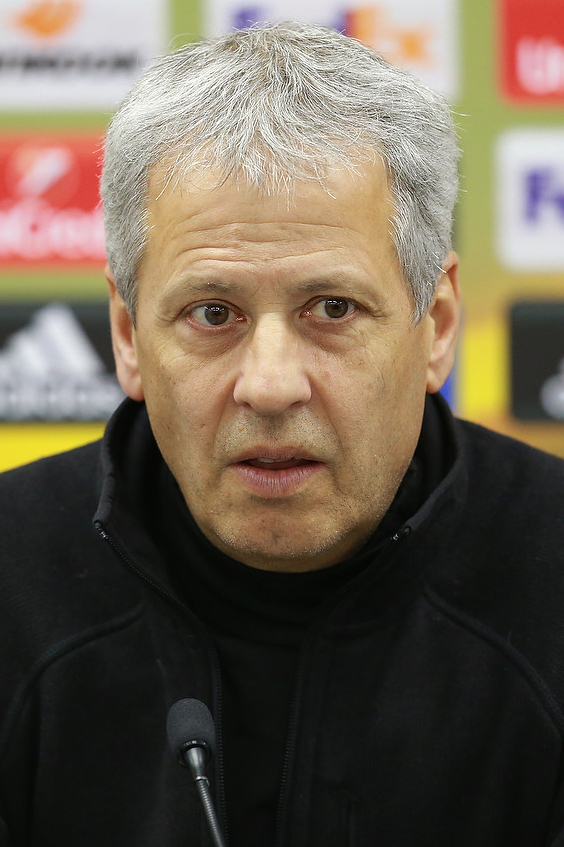
- Favre in 2018

Personal information
- Date of birth: 2 November 1957 (age 69)
- Place of birth: Saint-Barthélemy, Switzerland
- Height: 1.78 m (5 ft 10 in)
- Position: Midfielder

Youth career
- 1967–1971: FC Oulens
- 1972–1976: Lausanne-Sports

Senior career*
Years	Team	Apps	(Gls)
1976–1979	Lausanne-Sports	30	(3)
1979–1981	Neuchâtel Xamax	51	(14)
1981–1983	Servette	59	(28)
1983–1984	Toulouse	35	(7)
1984–1991	Servette	134	(20)
Total		309	(72)

International career
1981–1989	Switzerland	24	(1)

Managerial career
- 1993–1995: Echallens
- 1997–2000: Yverdon Sport
- 2000–2002: Servette
- 2003–2007: Zürich
- 2007–2009: Hertha BSC
- 2011–2015: Borussia Mönchengladbach
- 2016–2018: Nice
- 2018–2020: Borussia Dortmund
- 2022–2023: Nice
- * Club domestic league appearances and goals

Lucien Favre (French pronunciation: [lysjɛ̃ favʁ]; born 2 November 1957) is a Swiss professional football manager and former player who most recently managed Ligue 1 club Nice. Favre was a playmaker for various Swiss and French clubs, the longest for Servette, with whom he also won the championship. As a manager, he won the Swiss Cup and the Swiss championship with Servette and Zürich. In Germany, Favre also managed Hertha BSC and Borussia Mönchengladbach.

== Club career ==
At club level, Favre played for Lausanne-Sports, Neuchâtel Xamax, Toulouse and Servette, earning a reputation as a skillful and intelligent playmaker. When Pierre-Albert Chapuisat destroyed his knee in 1985, he could not play for eight months. It's still considered one of the worst fouls in Swiss footballing history. Favre announced his retirement in 1991.

== International career ==
Favre amassed 24 caps for the Switzerland national team. Notably, he scored his first and only international goal on his debut, netting in Zürich against the Netherlands on 1 September 1981 in the same game in which both Ruud Gullit and Frank Rijkaard also made their first appearance for the opposition. Favre earned his last cap for Switzerland against Portugal in a 3–1 away loss on 26 April 1989 played in Lisbon.

== Managerial career ==
=== Echallens ===
Favre's coaching career started in 1991 as the under-14 assistant manager with Echallens. The following year, he took over the under-17 team before being appointed manager of the first team in 1993. Under his leadership, Favre's young squad surprisingly earned promotion to the Nationalliga B. The promotion is still the most outstanding achievement in the club's history.

=== Neuchâtel Xamax ===
After four years with Echallens, Favre was named Academy Manager of Neuchâtel Xamax. The move allowed him to experience the overall operation of a professional club.

=== Yverdon-Sport and Servette ===
In January 1997, Favre was appointed manager of Yverdon Sport, who were struggling at the bottom of the Nationalliga B at that stage. In 1999, he guided his side to the Nationalliga A. The following season, they unexpectedly achieved a fifth-placed finish in the table, still Yverdon's best ranking in the top-flight to date.

In the summer of 2000, Favre decided to join Servette, a long-established club based in Geneva, where he had already won the league as a player. The highlights of his spell in Geneva were a 5–2 league win against Neuchâtel Xamax, a victory in the Swiss Cup final in 2001, as well as a superb run in the UEFA Cup, after finishing fifth. Servette eliminated Slavia Prague, Real Zaragoza and Favre's future employers Hertha BSC (with a 3–0 away win in Olympiastadion), before going out against Valencia (0–3 and 2–2) in the last 16. In the 2001–02 Swiss Cup, Servette forfeited a match 3–0.

=== Zürich ===
In 2003, Favre was appointed Zürich manager. His first match as Zürich manager was a 2–1 loss to Basel. In the 2003–04 season, Zürich finished in fifth place, one place below a 2004–05 UEFA Cup spot, and lost in the semi–finals of the Swiss Cup 6–5 to Grasshoppers. He won the Swiss Cup in 2005 beating Luzern in the final. The following season, Zürich ended their 25-year wait for a league title with a dramatic final day victory against Basel to win the Swiss Super League. They were also knocked out of the UEFA Cup in the first round. During the 2006–07 season, Zürich were eliminated from the UEFA Champions League in the second qualifying round. On 29 May 2007, after securing another Swiss title, he was awarded the Swiss Manager of the Year award for the second year in a row.

=== Hertha BSC ===
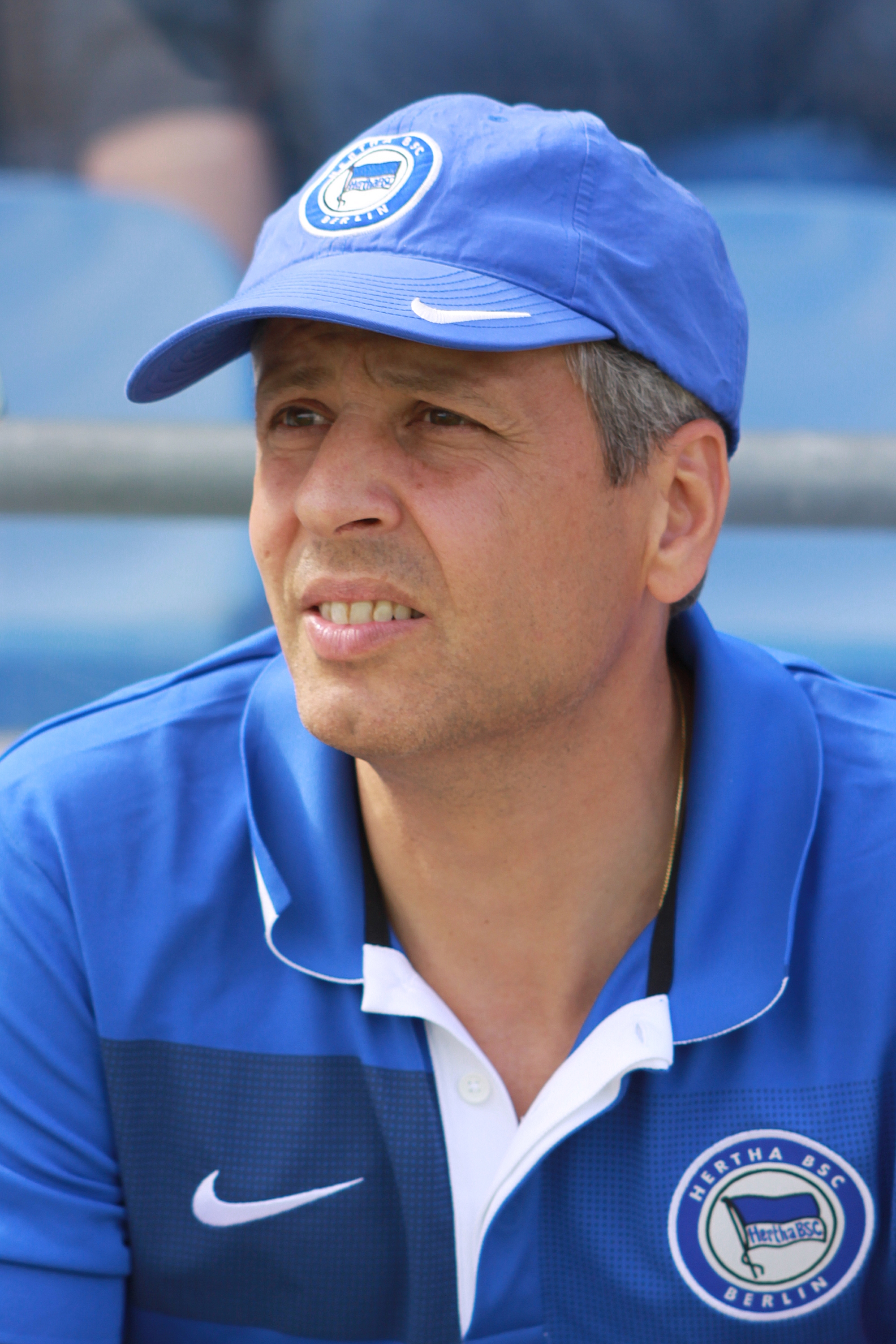
Favre as Hertha BSC manager in 2009

On 1 June 2007, German Bundesliga club Hertha BSC announced that Favre had agreed to sign a three-year deal as its head coach. He started the 2007–08 season with a 3–0 win against SpVgg Unterhaching in the first round of the DFB-Pokal.

During the 2008–09 season, he guided Hertha to an excellent fourth-place position, having at his disposal just the 13th-largest budget of the 2008–09 Bundesliga. Hertha played in the UEFA Cup and were eliminated in the group stage. In February 2009, one of the highlights of his spell in Germany was the brilliant tactical display of Hertha against Bayern Munich in a full Olympiastadion (almost 75,000 spectators). This performance allowed them to beat the erstwhile reigning German champions 2–1 to take Hertha temporarily top of the Bundesliga. Favre extended his contract for an additional year.

The 2009–10 season, however, did not look as promising for Hertha – its increasing financial difficulties prevented them from recruiting efficiently. Furthermore, three of the club's top players left in the summer: Josip Šimunić, Andriy Voronin and Marko Pantelić. At the end of September 2009, Hertha were struggling in the league and Favre was relieved of his duties by the club. Favre's final match was a 5–1 loss to 1899 Hoffenheim. Favre finished with a record of 40 wins, 20 draws, and 34 losses.

=== Borussia Mönchengladbach ===
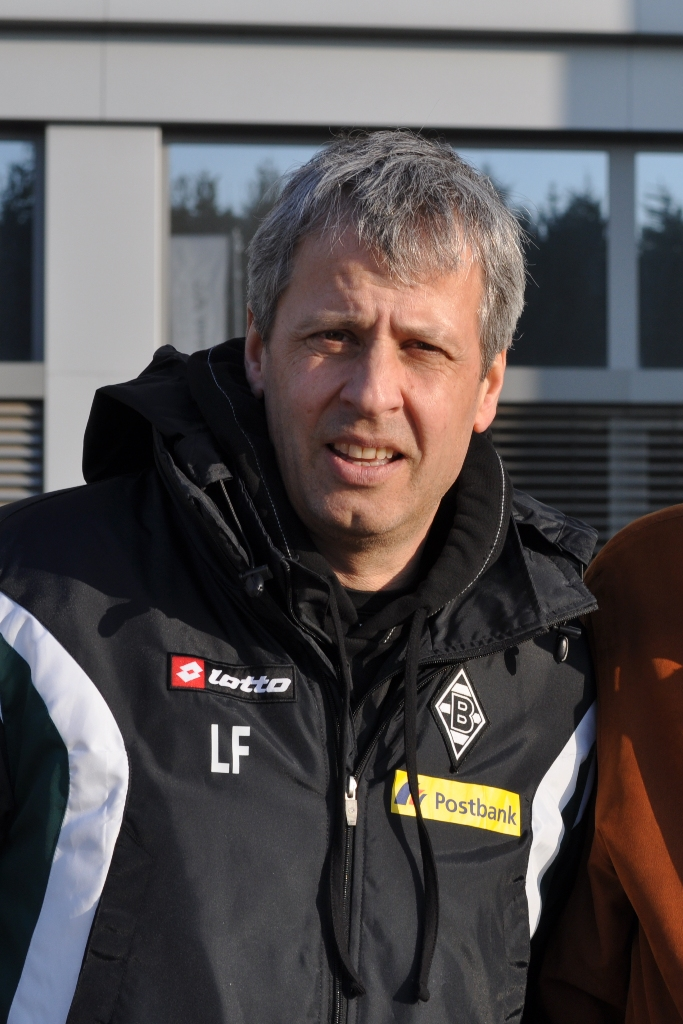
Favre with Borussia Mönchengladbach in 2011

On 14 February 2011, Favre was named as the successor of Michael Frontzeck as head coach of Borussia Mönchengladbach. He took over when the team was sitting at the bottom of the league with only 16 points after 22 match days, seven points adrift of Bundesliga safety. He instigated an immediate improvement in form and although the club still struggled, they eventually managed a narrow win against VfL Bochum in a two-legged relegation play-off to secure their place in the Bundesliga.

In the following season, the team surpassed all expectations by finishing in fourth place, thereby qualifying for the early stages of the 2012–13 UEFA Champions League. However, they were beaten in the play-off round by Dynamo Kyiv. The team's brand of fluid, counter-attacking football impressed pundits and press alike and was typified by an emphatic double win over Bayern Munich both home and away. Favre's Gladbach were not as successful in the 2012–13 Bundesliga, however, falling to eighth. Some suggested that the added weight of playing in Europe coupled with the sales of numerous key players, such as Marco Reus, was to blame for this. The next season saw Gladbach rise to sixth, largely due to the astute signings of Max Kruse, Raffael and Christoph Kramer.

During the 2013–14 season, Borussia Mönchengladbach were knocked out of the DFB-Pokal in the first round when SV Darmstadt 98 defeated Mönchengladbach in a shoot–out.

The 2014–15 Bundesliga season was Favre's most successful season to date, with Gladbach finishing in third place and directly qualifying for the 2015–16 UEFA Champions League group stage. Favre's side were defensively brilliant and their passing style of play saw them record several notable victories, including a 2–0 away win against Bayern Munich and a comprehensive 3–0 victory at home to Bayer Leverkusen that ultimately sealed their qualification to the Champions League.

After losing the first five league games of the 2015–16 season, Favre resigned on 20 September 2015. His final match was a 1–0 loss to 1. FC Köln the previous day. During his time at Gladbach, Favre revived a fallen giant of football, taking them from certainties for relegation to the pinnacle of world football in the Champions League. Favre finished with a record of 88 wins, 49 draws, and 52 losses.

=== Nice ===
On 24 May 2016, Favre was appointed as Nice manager, replacing Claude Puel. This appointment was widely considered as a coup for Nice by the French media. He brought in only one backroom staff, Adrian Ursea. In his first season, Nice, bolstered by striker Mario Balotelli, finished third after leading the league for much of the season, and qualified for the Champions League, their best league position in decades. His second season, however, did not live up to the expectations, as Nice finished 8th, and were eliminated in the Champions League qualifiers. Favre subsequently departed.

=== Borussia Dortmund ===
On 22 May 2018, Favre was appointed as manager of Borussia Dortmund, with a contract lasting until 30 June 2020. During his debut season, he became the first-ever manager to remain unbeaten in his first 15 Bundesliga matches with the club. This includes a 4–1 win against RB Leipzig, a 7–0 win against 1. FC Nürnberg, and a 4–0 win against Atlético Madrid. On 3 August 2019, Dortmund won the German Super Cup. He was sacked on 13 December 2020 after a string of poor results, including a 5–1 thumping at home against newly-promoted VfB Stuttgart. Favre finished with a record of 67 wins, 17 draws, and 23 losses.

=== Return to Nice ===
On 27 June 2022, Favre returned to Nice as manager. His first game in charge was a 1–1 draw with Toulouse on 7 August. His first win came on the 31st of said month against Lille 1–2 away from home. Favre was sacked in January 2023 following a 1–0 Coupe de France loss to third tier side Le Puy Foot 43 Auvergne.

== Style of management ==
Favre's teams play a game where ball possession and change of tempo alternate. This style of play has brought results in every club he has managed. Furthermore, Favre is very skillful tactically, leaving his opponents struggling to penetrate his sides. His teams tend to shoot less than others but have a high conversion rate, also with shots coming from outside the box. Favre likes the opponents conversion rate to be on the low end. His teams stick out at the wrong end of expected goals statistics. Favre has a reputation of predicting well how opposing teams, coaches or players tend to react in certain situations. To play this style Favre pays attention to details and technique especially one-to-one.

Favre is also well known for his ability to develop talented young players and introduce them into the first team. Under his leadership, Blerim Džemaili, Almen Abdi, Steve von Bergen and Gökhan Inler all made their debut with the Switzerland national team before signing for foreign clubs. In 2007, Zürich became Swiss champions with an average age of 21.5 years. He is also credited with raising the game of German starlet Marco Reus, whose fine performances procured a call up to the Germany national team and a high-priced move to league champions Borussia Dortmund; Marc-André ter Stegen, who eventually joined Barcelona; and Christoph Kramer. Another example of his ability to develop youngsters into widely sought after, talented players is seen in Granit Xhaka, who initially struggled when he joined Gladbach but, under Favre's tutelage, eventually thrived, becoming one of the best central midfielders in Germany and sealing a move to Arsenal for a fee reported to be in excess of €30 million.

== Managerial statistics ==
As of match played 7 January 2023

Managerial record by team and tenure
Team	From	To	Record					Ref.
Team	From	To	G	W	D	L	Win %	Ref.
Servette	1 July 2000	30 June 2002	83	34	26	23	40.96	
Zürich	1 July 2003	1 June 2007	169	94	33	42	55.62	
Hertha BSC	1 June 2007	28 September 2009	94	40	20	34	42.55	
Borussia Mönchengladbach	14 February 2011	20 September 2015	189	88	49	52	46.56	
Nice	24 May 2016	20 May 2018	99	42	24	33	42.42	
Borussia Dortmund	22 May 2018	13 December 2020	110	68	18	24	61.82	
Nice	27 June 2022	9 January 2023	26	8	9	9	30.77	
Total			770	374	179	217	48.57	—

== Honours ==
=== Player ===
Servette

- Nationalliga A: 1984–85

Individual

- Swiss Footballer of the Year: 1982–83

=== Manager ===
Echallens

- Nationalliga B promotion: 1993–94

Yverdon Sport

- Nationalliga A promotion: 1998–99

Servette

- Swiss Cup: 2000–01

Zürich

- Swiss Super League: 2005–06, 2006–07
- Swiss Cup: 2004–05

Borussia Dortmund

- DFL-Supercup: 2019

Individual

- Swiss Manager of the Year: 2006, 2007
- Sport1 Manager of the Year: 2011
- VDV Bundesliga Coach of the Season: 2011–12
- Kicker Player Poll Manager of the First Half: 2013–14
- Kicker Player Poll Manager of the Season: 2014–15
