= Shervin Radjabali-Fardi =

German former professional footballer (born 1991)

Personal information
- Full name: Shervin Radjabali-Fardi
- Date of birth: 17 May 1991 (age 35)
- Place of birth: Berlin, Germany
- Height: 1.78 m (5 ft 10 in)
- Position: Left-back

Youth career
- 1996–2001: Hertha Zehlendorf
- 2001–2003: Lichterfelde
- 2003–2008: Hertha BSC

Senior career*
| Years | Team | Apps | (Gls) |
| 2008–2013 | Hertha BSC II | 62 | (1) |
| 2008–2013 | Hertha BSC | 0 | (0) |
| 2010–2012 | → Alemannia Aachen (loan) | 38 | (2) |
| 2013–2015 | Hansa Rostock | 46 | (2) |
| Total | | 146 | (5) |

International career
| | Germany U15 | 3 | (0) |
| | Germany U16 | 9 | (0) |
| | Germany U17 | 9 | (0) |
| 2009 | Germany U18 | 1 | (0) |
| 2008–2010 | Germany U19 | 13 | (0) |
| 2010–2011 | Germany U20 | 4 | (0) |
| 2011 | Germany U21 | 1 | (0) |
- * Club domestic league appearances and goals

Shervin Radjabali-Fardi (Persian: شروین رجبعلی‌فردی; born 17 May 1991) is a German former professional footballer who played as a left-back.

== Club career ==
Born in Berlin, Germany, Radjabali-Fardi began his career with Hertha Zehlendorf and after five years he joined Lichterfelder FC in 2001. After only two years in Lichterfelde, he was scouted by Hertha BSC.

=== Hertha BSC ===
Radjabali-Fardi made his Hertha debut on 17 July 2008 in the 2008–09 UEFA Cup first qualifying round 1st leg against Nistru Otaci. He played two more UEFA Cup qualifying matches, and Hertha's Europa League group phase match against FK Ventspils the following season, but never featured in Hertha's first team in domestic competitions. After two and a half years on the bench, Hertha loaned him to Alemannia Aachen until the end of the 2011–12 season. He was released by Hertha at the end of the 2012–13 season.

=== Alemannia Aachen ===
After joining Aachen on loan from Hertha, he made his debut on the 19th matchday of the 2. Bundesliga against Karlsruher SC, and scored his first goal a month later in Aachen's 3–1 win over SC Paderborn 07. Over the course of the loan, Radjabali-Fardi played in about two-thirds of Aachen's matches, making 38 league appearances and scoring twice. At the end of the 2011–12 season, Radjabali-Fardi's loan expired and he returned to Hertha Berlin.

=== Hansa Rostock ===
On 12 June 2013, Radjabali-Fardi signed for 3. Liga side Hansa Rostock. In August 2014, he tore a cruciate ligament for the second time in his career.

He retired at the age of 25.

== International career ==
Radjabali-Fardi was a member of German national youth teams, but is also eligible to play for Iran.

== Personal life ==
He was born to an Iranian father and German mother.

== Career statistics ==
| Club | Division | Season | League | | Cup | | Continental | | Other | | Total | |
| Club | Division | Season | Apps | Goals | Apps | Goals | Apps | Goals | Apps | Goals | Apps | Goals |
|---|---|---|---|---|---|---|---|---|---|---|---|---|
| Hertha BSC II | Regionalliga Nord | 2008–09 | 19 | 0 | 0 | 0 | – | – | – | – | 19 | 0 |
| Hertha BSC II | Regionalliga Nord | 2009–10 | 17 | 0 | 0 | 0 | – | – | – | – | 17 | 0 |
| Hertha BSC II | Regionalliga Nord | 2010–11 | 15 | 0 | 0 | 0 | – | – | – | – | 15 | 0 |
| Hertha BSC II | Regionalliga Nordost | 2012–13 | 11 | 1 | 0 | 0 | – | – | – | – | 11 | 1 |
| Hertha BSC II | Total | | 62 | 1 | 0 | 0 | 0 | 0 | 0 | 0 | 62 | 1 |
| Hertha BSC | Bundesliga | 2008–09 | 0 | 0 | 0 | 0 | 3 | 0 | – | – | 3 | 0 |
| Hertha BSC | Bundesliga | 2009–10 | 0 | 0 | 0 | 0 | 1 | 0 | – | – | 1 | 0 |
| Hertha BSC | 2. Bundesliga | 2010–11 | 0 | 0 | 0 | 0 | – | – | – | – | 0 | 0 |
| Hertha BSC | 2. Bundesliga | 2012–13 | 0 | 0 | 0 | 0 | – | – | – | – | 0 | 0 |
| Hertha BSC | Total | | 0 | 0 | 0 | 0 | 4 | 0 | 0 | 0 | 4 | 0 |
| Alemannia Aachen | 2. Bundesliga | 2010–11 | 14 | 2 | 1 | 0 | – | – | – | – | 15 | 2 |
| Alemannia Aachen | 2. Bundesliga | 2011–12 | 24 | 0 | 1 | 0 | – | – | – | – | 25 | 0 |
| Alemannia Aachen | Total | | 38 | 2 | 2 | 0 | 0 | 0 | 0 | 0 | 40 | 2 |
| Alemannia Aachen II | NRW-Liga | 2011–12 | 2 | 0 | 0 | 0 | – | – | – | – | 2 | 0 |
| Hansa Rostock | 3. Liga | 2013–14 | 36 | 2 | 0 | 0 | – | – | – | – | 36 | 2 |
| Hansa Rostock | 3. Liga | 2014–15 | 10 | 0 | 0 | 0 | – | – | 2 | – | 12 | 0 |
| Hansa Rostock | Total | | 46 | 2 | 0 | 0 | 0 | 0 | 2 | 0 | 48 | 2 |
| Career total | | | 148 | 5 | 2 | 0 | 4 | 0 | 2 | 0 | 156 | 5 |

== Honours ==
=== Individual ===
- Fritz-Walter-Medal 2008 in Bronze (Category U17)
- Fritz-Walter-Medal 2010 in Bronze (Category U19)
