= Amadeus Wallschläger =

German footballer (born 1985)

Personal information
- Date of birth: 1 September 1985 (age 41)
- Place of birth: Eisenhüttenstadt, East Germany
- Height: 1.77 m (5 ft 10 in)
- Position: Defender

Youth career
- SG Aufbau Eisenhüttenstadt
- Eisenhüttenstädter FC Stahl
- Viktoria Frankfurt/Oder
- 2001–2003: Hertha BSC

Senior career*
Years	Team	Apps	(Gls)
2003–2008	Hertha BSC II	84	(0)
2006–2008	Hertha BSC	1	(0)
2008–2009	FC Carl Zeiss Jena	17	(0)
2009	FC Carl Zeiss Jena II	3	(0)
2009–2012	BFC Dynamo	75	(2)
2012–2015	FSV Union Fürstenwalde	80	(2)
Total		260	(4)
- * Club domestic league appearances and goals

Amadeus Wallschläger (born 1 September 1985) is a German former professional footballer who played as a defender.

== Career ==
Born in Eisenhüttenstadt, Wallschläger played for SG Aufbau Eisenhüttenstadt, Eisenhüttenstädter FC Stahl, Viktoria Frankfurt/Oder, Hertha BSC, Hertha BSC II, FC Carl Zeiss Jena, FC Carl Zeiss Jena II, Berliner FC Dynamo and FSV Union Fürstenwalde.
