= Christopher Gäng =

German footballer

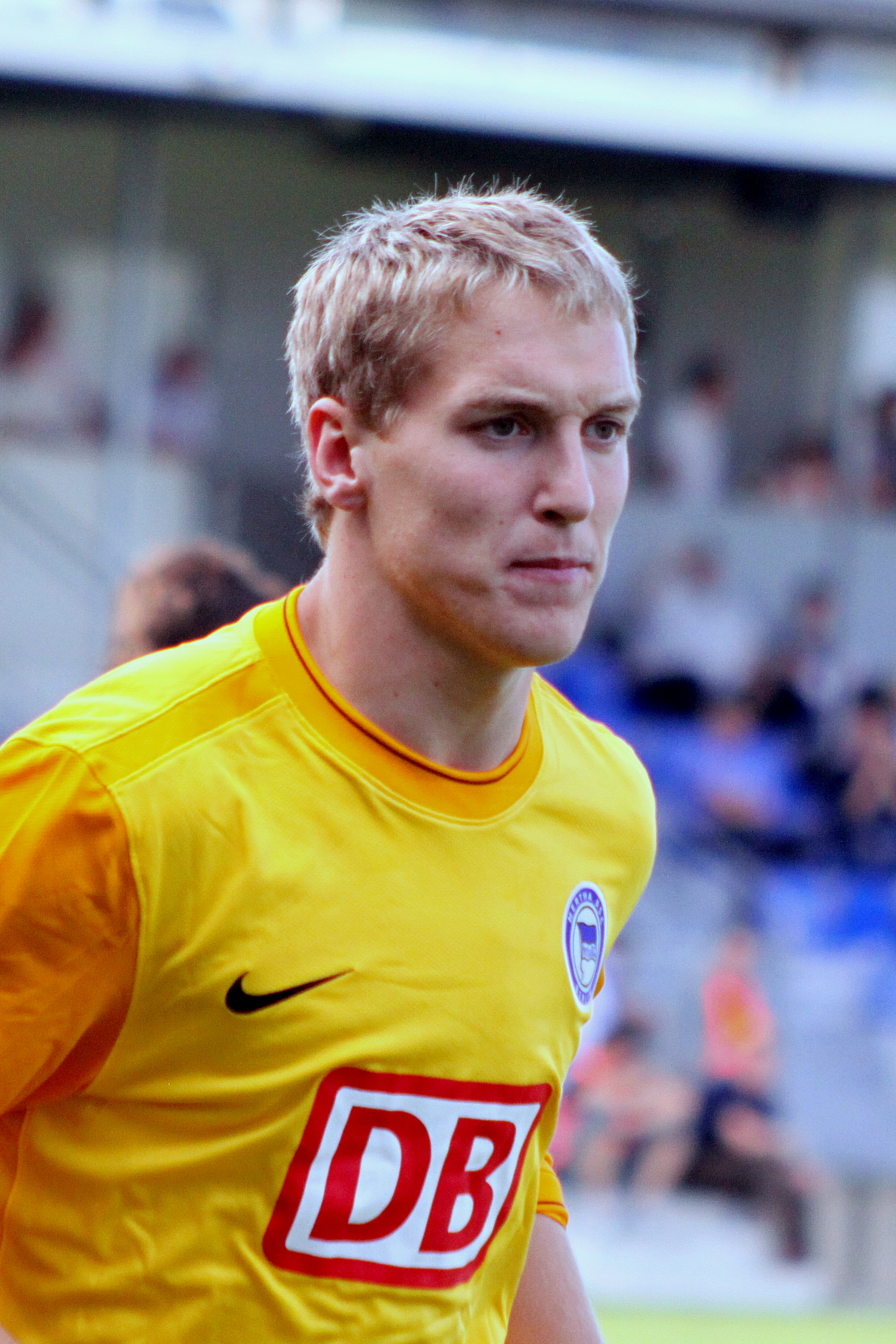
- Gäng with Hertha BSC in 2009

Personal information
- Full name: Christopher Gäng
- Date of birth: 10 May 1988 (age 38)
- Place of birth: Mannheim, West Germany
- Height: 1.88 m (6 ft 2 in)
- Position: Goalkeeper

Youth career
- 1994–1999: SSV Vogelstang
- 1999–2005: Waldhof Mannheim

Senior career*
Years	Team	Apps	(Gls)
2006–2007	Waldhof Mannheim	43	(0)
2007–2010	Hertha BSC	1	(0)
2007–2010	Hertha BSC II	22	(0)
2010–2011	RB Leipzig	8	(0)
2011	BFC Türkiyemspor	9	(0)
2012–2013	Lokomotive Leipzig	36	(0)
2013–2016	Sonnenhof Großaspach	69	(0)
2016–2019	Waldhof Mannheim	2	(0)
2016–2019	Waldhof Mannheim II	3	(0)
Total		193	(0)
- * Club domestic league appearances and goals

Christopher Gäng (born 10 May 1988) is a German former professional footballer who played as a goalkeeper.

== Career ==
He made his professional debut for Hertha in the Bundesliga on 1 November 2008 against Werder Bremen when the first goalkeeper, Jaroslav Drobný was injured. He allowed five goals in a 5–1 loss and did not play for the first team anymore until he left.

For the 2013–14 season, Gäng moved to SG Sonnenhof Großaspach in the Regionalliga Südwest. In June 2016, Gäng returned to his hometown of Mannheim and signed a three-year contract with SV Waldhof Mannheim. Ahead of the 2019–20 season, his contract with the club was not extended.

== Personal life ==
In 2013, Gäng revealed that he had suffered from gambling addiction, obesity and depression during his football career, criticising the sport as "prostitution".
