= Sauldorf =

- Municipality
- Coat of arms

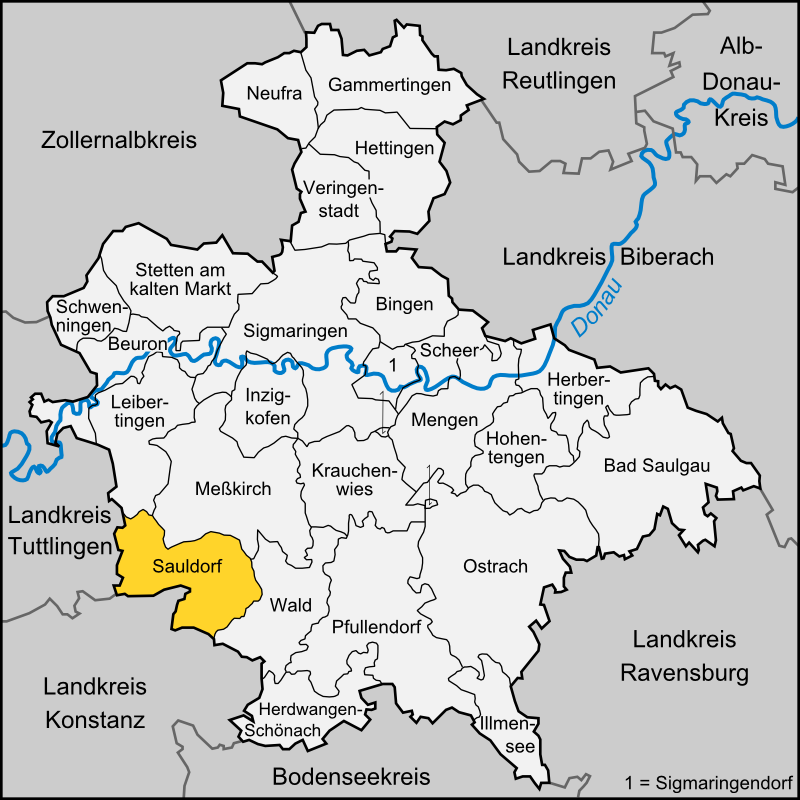
- Location of Sauldorf within Sigmaringen district
- Interactive map of Sauldorf
- Location within Germany Location within Baden-Württemberg
- Coordinates: 47°56′40″N 9°6′29″E
- Country: Germany
- State: Baden-Württemberg
- Admin. region: Tübingen
- District: Sigmaringen

Government
  - Mayor (2022–30): Severin Rommeler

Area
  - Total: 49.72 km^{2} (19.20 sq mi)
- Elevation: 646 m (2,119 ft)

Population (2025-12-31)
  - Total: 2,606
  - Density: 52.41/km^{2} (135.8/sq mi)
- Time zone: UTC+01:00 (CET)
  - Summer (DST): UTC+02:00 (CEST)
- Postal codes: 88605
- Dialling codes: 07578
- Vehicle registration: SIG
- Website: www.sauldorf.de

Sauldorf is a municipality in the district of Sigmaringen in Baden-Württemberg in Germany.
