= Solomon Okoronkwo =

Nigerian footballer (born 1987)

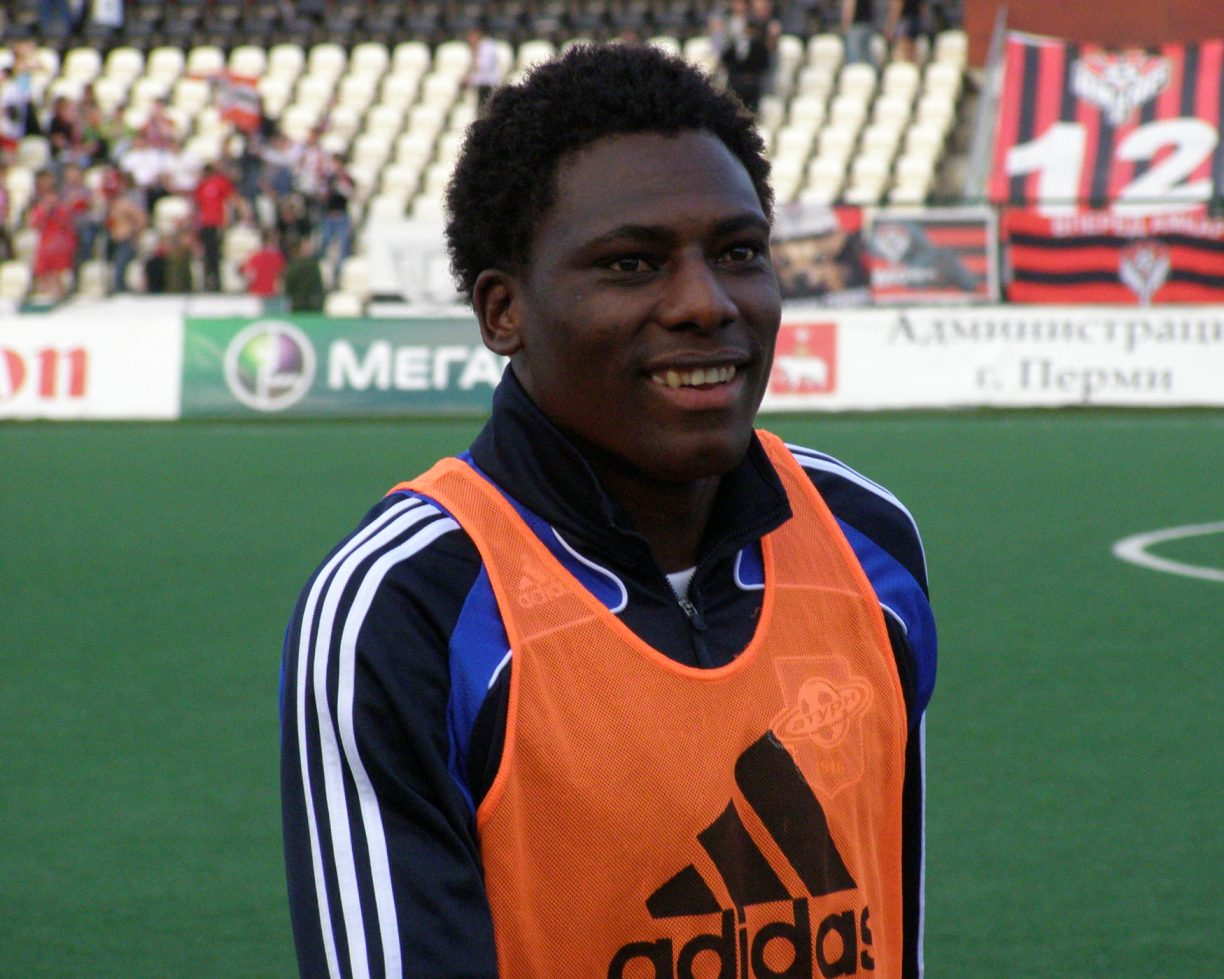

Personal information
- Full name: Solomon Ndubisi Okoronkwo
- Date of birth: 2 March 1987 (age 39)
- Place of birth: Enugu, Nigeria
- Position: Forward

Youth career
- River Lane Youth Club
- Gabros International

Senior career*
Years	Team	Apps	(Gls)
2004	Gabros International		
2005–2008	Hertha BSC	39	(4)
2007	→ Rot-Weiss Essen (loan)	15	(1)
2008–2011	Saturn Moscow Oblast	14	(0)
2011–2012	Aalesund	12	(0)
2012–2013	Pécsi MFC	17	(4)
2013–2015	Erzgebirge Aue	29	(2)
2015	SV Sandhausen	12	(0)
2015–2016	1. FC Saarbrücken	25	(6)
2017	TSG Neustrelitz	13	(3)
2017–2018	BFC Dynamo	24	(3)
2018–2019	BSV Rehden	17	(2)
2020	HSC Hannover	4	(0)
2020–2021	CFC Hertha 06	8	(3)
2021	Brandenburger SC Süd	3	(0)
2021–2022	CFC Hertha 06	25	(6)
2023	Berlin Türkspor	9	(0)
2023–2024	BFC Meteor 06	21	(10)
Total		287	(44)

International career
2003	Nigeria U17	2	(0)
2005	Nigeria U20	6	(0)
2008	Nigeria U23	6	(0)
2010–2011	Nigeria	2	(0)
Medal record
Representing Nigeria
Men's Football
Silver medal – second place	2008 Beijing	Team competition
- * Club domestic league appearances and goals

Solomon Ndubisi Okoronkwo // (born 2 March 1987) is a Nigerian former professional footballer who played as a forward.

== Career ==
He was discovered in 2004 by FIFA agent Marcelo Houseman, who got his guardianship and took him to Hertha BSC. In October 2004, his agent recommended Okoronkwo to coach Samson Siasia and he was fundamental for Nigeria's U-20 qualifying for the African Youth Championship in Benin 2005. He was also on the Nigerian Under 23 team that won silver at the 2008 Beijing Olympics. Okoronkwo was called up for his first senior cap in October 2008 by Nigeria coach Shaibu Amodu.

On 28 January 2011, Okoronkwo moved to Aalesund in the Norwegian Premier League.

After playing in the lower tiers of German football for several Berlin-based clubs, including BFC Dynamo, CFC Hertha 06, Berlin Türkspor, and BFC Meteor 06 from 2017 to 2024, Okoronkwo left senior football and transitioned to veterans football, rejoining many former Hertha BSC players in the Ü32 team.

== Career statistics ==
Appearances and goals by club, season and competition
Season	Club	Division	League		Cup		Total	
Season	Club	Division	Apps	Goals	Apps	Goals	Apps	Goals
Aalesund	2011	Tippeligaen	12	0	4	2	16	2
Pécsi	2011–12	OTP Bank Liga	7	1	0	0	7	1
Pécsi	2012–13	OTP Bank Liga	10	3	3	1	13	4
Erzgebirge Aue	2013–14	2. Bundesliga	12	0	1	0	13	0
Career total			41	4	8	3	49	7
