= Sofian Chahed =

Footballer (born 1983)

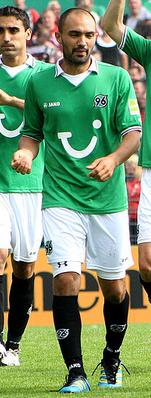
- Chahed in 2011

Personal information
- Date of birth: 18 April 1983 (age 43)
- Place of birth: West Berlin, West Germany
- Height: 1.78 m (5 ft 10 in)
- Position: Defender

Youth career
- 1997–1999: Hertha Zehlendorf
- 1999–2003: Hertha BSC

Senior career*
Years	Team	Apps	(Gls)
2003–2009	Hertha BSC	89	(4)
2004–2009	Hertha BSC II	43	(2)
2009–2013	Hannover 96	63	(2)
2009–2013	Hannover 96 II	2	(0)
2014	FSV Frankfurt	0	(0)

International career
2002	Germany U19	5	(0)
2002–2003	Germany U20	8	(0)
2009–2013	Tunisia	4	(0)

Managerial career
- 2015–2016: BFC Viktoria 1889 (assistant)
- 2016–2020: Hertha BSC (youth)
- 2020–2022: Turbine Potsdam
- * Club domestic league appearances and goals

Sofian Chahed (born 18 April 1983) is a football coach and former professional footballer who played as a defender.

Born in Germany, Chahed represented Tunisia at senior international level.

== Early and personal life ==
Chahed was born in Berlin, West Germany, to Tunisian parents; he holds dual German-Tunisian nationality. His cousin Tarek Chahed was also a footballer.

== Club career ==
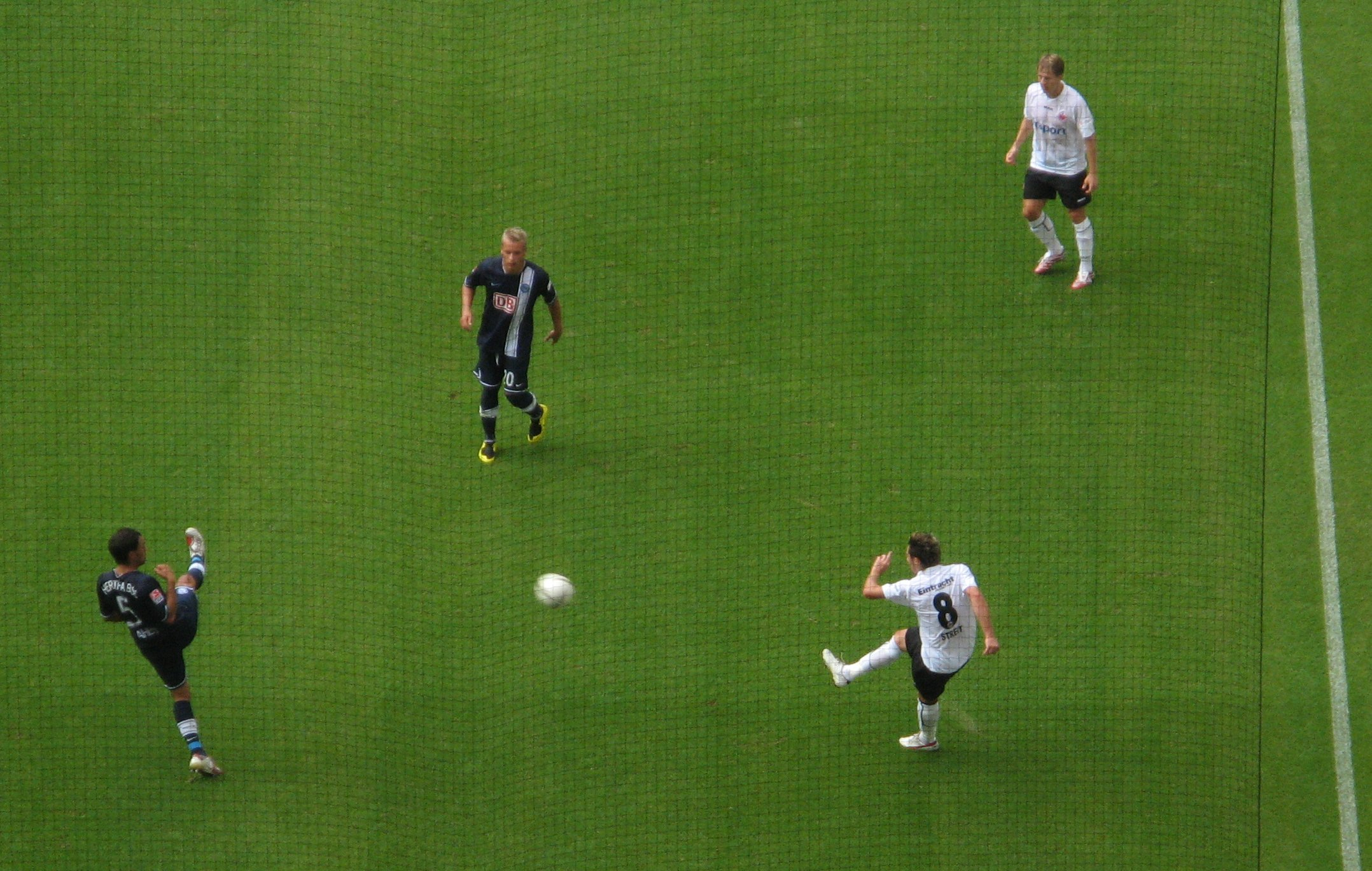
Chahed (left) playing for Hertha BSC

Chahed made his professional debut for Hertha BSC in 2003, and was released at the end of the 2009 season. Chahed later played for Hannover 96 and FSV Frankfurt.

== International career ==
Chahed played for Germany at youth international level.

Chahed was called up by the Tunisia national side for a training camp on 1 September 2009. He made his senior debut for Tunisia on 11 October 2009.

== Coaching career ==
In 2015, Chahed began working as the assistant manager at BFC Viktoria 1889. From 2016 to 2020, he coached the youth teams of Hertha BSC.

In 2020, Chahed became the head coach of 1. FFC Turbine Potsdam.

In June 2022, Chahed departed the club.
