= Pascal Bieler =

German footballer (born 1986)

Personal information
- Date of birth: 26 February 1986 (age 40)
- Place of birth: West Berlin, West Germany
- Height: 1.82 m (5 ft 11 1/2 in)
- Position: Defender

Team information
- Current team: Borussia Dortmund II (Assistant)

Youth career
- 1993–1999: SC Tegel
- 1999–2004: Hertha BSC

Senior career*
Years	Team	Apps	(Gls)
2004–2008	Hertha BSC	6	(0)
2006–2007	→ Rot-Weiss Essen (loan)	33	(0)
2008–2011	1. FC Nürnberg	21	(1)
2008–2010	→ 1. FC Nürnberg II	8	(0)
2011–2013	SV Wehen Wiesbaden	58	(1)
2013–2016	Würzburger Kickers	39	(2)
2016	Wuppertaler SV	5	(0)

Managerial career
- 2016–2018: Wuppertaler SV (U19 assistant)
- 2018: Wuppertaler SV (U19 caretaker)
- 2018–2020: Wuppertaler SV (assistant)
- 2018–2020: Wuppertaler SV (U19)
- 2019: Wuppertaler SV (caretaker)
- 2020: Wuppertaler SV
- 2020–: Borussia Dortmund II (assistant)
- * Club domestic league appearances and goals

Pascal Bieler (born 26 February 1986) is a German football coach and former professional player. Bieler is currently the assistant of Borussia Dortmund II.

He was a left defensive back and he is a product of the Hertha BSC youth academy.

== Coaching career ==
Four months after Bieler's arrival to Wuppertaler SV in the summer 2016, he retired and instead accepted a new role as assistant manager of the club's U19 squad. On 8 February 2018 the club announced, that U19 manager Christian Britscho had been promoted to the first team manager and Bieler would take charge of the U19 team as caretaker manager and would also be assistant manager for the first team. On 27 April 2018 it was confirmed, that Bieler would remain as manager of the U19 squad alongside his role as assistant manager for the first team.

After first team manager Adrian Alipour was fired on 25 March 2019, Bieler was appointed as caretaker manager for the rest of the season. In October 2019 he was replaced by Alexander Voigt. In January 2020 he became permanent manager of Wuppertaler SV on a short-term contract following Voigt's departure from the club.

In June 2020 he left Wuppertal to become an assistant at Borussia Dortmund II.
